= 2015–16 Coupe de France =

Coupe Charles Simon

Tournament details
- Country: France

Final positions
- Champions: Paris Saint-Germain (10th title)
- Runners-up: Marseille

Tournament statistics
- Matches played: 195
- Top goal scorer(s): Zlatan Ibrahimović (7 goals)

The 2015–16 Coupe de France was the 99th season of the most prestigious football cup competition of France. The competition was organised by the French Football Federation (FFF) and was opened to all clubs in French football, as well as clubs from the overseas departments and territories (Guadeloupe, French Guiana, Martinique, Mayotte, New Caledonia (Hienghène Sport, winner of 2015 New Caledonia Cup), Tahiti (A.S. Pirae, winner of 2015 Tahiti Cup), Réunion, and Saint Martin).

Paris Saint-Germain were the defending champions, defeated Auxerre in the previous season's final. They defended their title after defeating Marseille 4–2 in the final.

== Teams ==
=== Round 1 to 6 ===
The first six rounds, and any preliminaries, are organised by the Regional Leagues and the Overseas Territories, who allow teams from within their league structure to enter at any point up to the Third round. Teams from CFA 2 enter at the Third round, those from CFA enter at the Fourth round and those from Championnat National enter at the Fifth round.

Teams entering in each round, by Region:

Region	Prelim.	First	Second	Third	Fourth	Fifth
Alsace		386	11	30	2	2
Aquitaine		202	37	15	6	0
Atlantique		324	38	14	3	2
Auvergne		236	4	13	3	0
Lower Normandy		178	25	3	0	1
Bourgogne		40	76	14	1	0
Brittany		554	125	15	4	0
Centre-Val de Loire	44	174	0	5	1	2
Centre-West		268	22	18	0	0
Champagne-Ardenne		152	16	14	0	1
Corsica				28	0	1
Franche-Comté		150	3	3	1	1
Languedoc-Roussillon		204	38	4	1	1
Lorraine			14	117	0	1
Maine		144	18	3	0	0
Méditerranée		178	27	4	5	2
Midi-Pyrénées				86	5	0
Nord-Pas de Calais		544	74	19	4	2
Normandie		128	50	3	2	0
Paris Île-de-France				144	16	0
Picardie			168	14	3	2
Rhône-Alpes		570	15	66	4	0

=== Round 7 onwards ===
In the Seventh round, the 156 qualifying teams from the Regional Leagues and the Overseas Territories are joined by the 20 teams from Ligue 2. The 20 Ligue 1 clubs enter in the Ninth round.

The teams qualifying for Seventh round, by region and level, are:

Ligue 2

No	Team
1.	AC Ajaccio
2.	AJ Auxerre
3.	Bourg-en-Bresse
4.	Stade Brestois 29
5.	Clermont Foot
6.	US Créteil-Lusitanos
7.	Dijon FCO
8.	Evian Thonon Gaillard F.C.
9.	Stade Lavallois
10.	Le Havre AC
11.	RC Lens
12.	FC Metz
13.	AS Nancy
14.	Nîmes Olympique
15.	Chamois Niortais F.C.
16.	Paris FC
17.	Red Star F.C.
18.	FC Sochaux-Montbéliard
19.	Tours FC
20.	Valenciennes FC

Alsace

No	Team	Tier
21.	S Reunis Colmar	National
22.	RC Strasbourg Alsace	National
23.	FC Mulhouse	CFA
24.	FC Saint-Louis Neuweg	CFA
25.	US Sarre-Union	CFA
26.	SC Schiltigheim	CFA 2
27.	SC Dinsheim	DH
28.	FCE Schirrhein	Exc Bas-Rhone (7)
29.	SC Ebersheim	PH Bas-Rhone (9)

Aquitaine

No	Team	Tier
30.	Stade Bordelais ASPTT	CFA
31.	Stade Montois	CFA
32.	Trélissac FC	CFA
33.	Les Genêts d'Anglet Football	CFA 2
34.	US Lege Cap Ferret	CFA 2
35.	FC Libourne	DH

Atlantique

No	Team	Tier
36.	Vendée Les Herbiers F	Nat
37.	Vendée Lucon F	Nat
38.	Voltigeurs de Chateaubriant	CFA
39.	US Ste Anne de Vertou	CFA 2
40.	Orvault Sports Football	DH
41.	St Nazaire Atlantique Football	DH
42.	Olympique Saumur FC	DH
43.	ASPTT - CAEB Cholet	Sup Maine-et-Loire (10)

Auvergne

No	Team	Tier
44.	AS Moulinoise	CFA
45.	SA Thiernois	CFA 2
46.	CS de Volvic	DH
47.	FC Espaly	DHR (7)
48.	US Vic Le Comte	PHR (8)

Lower Normandy

No	Team	Tier
49.	US d'Avranches Mont St Michel	Nat
50.	US Granvillaise	CFA 2
51.	FC St Lo Manche	CFA 2
52.	SU Divaise	DH

(Burgundy) Bourgogne

No	Team	Tier
53.	FC Montceau Bourgogne	CFA
54.	SC Selongeen	CFA 2
55.	FC Sens	CFA 2
56.	Louhans Cuiseaux FC	DH

Centre-Val de Loire

No	Team	Tier
57.	US Orleans Loiret F	Nat
58.	Bourges 18	CFA 2
59.	Bourges Foot	DH
60.	CS Mainvilliers F	DHR (7)

Centre-West

No	Team	Tier
61.	Limoges FC	CFA 2
62.	Entente S La Rochelle	DH
63.	Entente S Gueretoise	DHR (7)
64.	US St Sauveur (7)	DHR (7)
65.	FC Nord 17	PL (9)
66.	AS Panazol	1ere Haute-Vienne (10)

Corsica

No	Team	Tier
67.	Borgo FC	CFA 2
68.	F Balagne Ile Rousse	CFA 2

Franche-Comté

No	Team	Tier
69.	Jura Sud Foot	CFA
70.	Besançon FC	CFA 2
71.	Racing Besançon	CFA 2

Languedoc-Roussillon

No	Team	Tier
72.	Avenir S Béziers	Nat
73.	FC de Sete	CFA
74.	Avenir S Frontignan AC	DH
75.	OC Perpignan	DH
76.	Stade Balarucois	DHR (7)

Lorraine

No	Team	Tier
77.	AS Pagny Sur Moselle	CFA 2
78.	US Raon L'Etape	CFA 2
79.	Sarreguemines FC	CFA 2
80.	Renaissance S Magny	DH
81.	Amicale du Personnel Municipal Metz FC	DH
82.	S Reunis Deodatiens	DH
83.	AS Clouange	PH (8)
84.	AS Reding	PHR (9)

Maine

No	Team	Tier
85.	US Changeenne	CFA 2
86.	CO St Saturnin Arche	DH
87.	La Suze FC	DH

Méditerranée

No	Team	Tier
88.	Etoile FC Frejus St Raphael	Nat
89.	Groupe S Consolat	Nat
90.	Berre SC	DHR (7)
91.	FC Istres Ouest Provence	DHR (7)
92.	JS St Jean Beaulieu	DHR (7)

Midi-Pyrénées

No	Team	Tier
93.	US Colomiers F	CFA
94.	Blagnac FC	CFA 2
95.	AS Muret	DH
96.	Rodéo FC	DH
97.	Toulouse St Jo FSC	DH
98.	Montauban FCTG	DHR (7)

(Nord-Pas-de-Calais) Nord-Pas de Calais

No	Team	Tier
99.	US Boulogne Côte d'Opale	Nat
100.	US Littoral Dunkerque	Nat
101.	Iris Club de Croix	CFA
102.	Entente S Wasquehal	CFA
103.	AS Marck	CFA 2
104.	Stade Bethunois	DH
105.	SC Hazebrouckois	DH
106.	US Maubeuge	DH
107.	St Amand FC	DH
108.	US St Omer	DH
109.	US Vimy	DHR (7)
110.	SC Douai	PH (8)
111.	AC Mons En Baroeul	PH (8)

Champagne-Ardenne

No	Team	Tier
112.	CS Sedan Ardennes	Nat
113.	RC Épernay Champagne	CFA 2
114.	AS de Prix Les Mezieres	DH
115.	Ecole de F Reims Ste Anne Chatillons	DH

(Upper Normandy) Normandy

No	Team	Tier
116.	US Quevilly-Rouen Métropole	CFA
117.	Entente S Municipale Gonfreville	CFA 2
118.	C Municipal S d'Oissel	CFA 2
119.	Yvetot AC	DHR (7)

Brittany

No	Team	Tier
120.	US Concarnoise Beuzecquoise	CFA
121.	US Saint-Malo	CFA
122.	Stade Briochin	CFA 2
123.	AGL-Drapeau Fougeres F	CFA 2
124.	Garde St Ivy Pontivy	CFA 2
125.	La Tour d'Auvergne Rennes	CFA 2
126.	US Montagnarde Inzinzac Lochrist	DH
127.	Cercle Paul Bert Brequigny Rennes	DH
128.	FC La Chapelle Montgermont	DSE (7)
129.	Stade Paimpolais FC	DSE (7)
130.	US La Gacilly	DSR (8)
131.	Rostrenen FC	DSR (8)
132.	En Avante de St Renen	DSR (8)
133.	US Liffre	DRH (9)

Paris Île-de-France

No	Team	Tier
134.	Aubervilliers C	CFA
135.	Mantois 78 FC	CFA
136.	Poissy AS	CFA
137.	Sannois St Gratien Entente	CFA
138.	Viry Chatillon Entente S	CFA
139.	UJA Maccabi Paris Métropole	CFA 2
140.	Noisy Le Sec Banlieue 93 O	CFA 2
141.	St Ouen l'Aumone AS	CFA 2
142.	Blanc Mesnil SF	DH
143.	FC Versailles 78	DH
144.	Bretigny Foot CS	DSR (7)

(Picardy) Picardie

No	Team	Tier
145.	Amiens SC Picardie	Nat
146.	FC Chambly Thelle	Nat
147.	AC Amiens	CFA
148.	FC Ailly-sur-Somme Samara	CFA 2
149.	AS Beauvais Oise	CFA 2
150.	US de Chantilly	DH
151.	A des FC de Creil	PH (7)

Rhône-Alpes

No	Team	Tier
152.	Monts d'Or Azergues Foot	CFA
153.	Grenoble Foot 38	CFA
154.	Lyon-Duchere AS	CFA
155.	FC Villefranche	CFA
156.	FC d'Annecy	CFA 2
157.	AS Forez Andrezieux Boutheon	CFA 2
158.	FC d'Echirolles	DH
159.	FC Limonest	DH
160.	U Montilienne S	DH
161.	Chassieu Decines FC	DHR (7)
162.	US Gieroise	DHR (7)
163.	Hauts Lyonnais	DHR (7)
164.	FC Veyle Saône	DHR (7)
165.	FC Pontcharra St Loup	PE Lyon et Rhône (10)

Overseas Clubs

No	Team	Tier	Nation
166.	Hienghène Sport	Super League	New Caledonia
167.	A.S. Pirae	Super League	(French Polynesia) Tahiti
168.	Etoile Filante Iracoubo	Division Honneur	French Guiana
169.	ASC Agouado	Division Honneur	French Guiana
170.	Golden Star	Division Honneur	Martinique
171.	Golden Lion FC	Division Honneur	Martinique
172.	AS Jumeaux de M'zouazia	Division Honneur	Mayotte
173.	AS Excelsior	Championnat D1	Réunion
174.	US Sainte-Marienne	Championnat D1	Réunion
175.	CS Moulien	Division Honneur	Guadeloupe
176.	L'Etoile de Morne-à-l'Eau	Division Honneur	Guadeloupe

== Seventh Round ==
These matches were originally scheduled to take place on 13, 14 and 15 November, although some matches were postponed to the following weekdue to the November 2015 Paris attacks.

13 November 2015	Montceau-les-Mines (4)	1–3	Metz (2)	Montceau-les-Mines
19:00 CET	El Rhayti 76'		Mayuka 57'; Ngbakoto 71', 82'	Stadium: Stade des Alouettes; Referee: Sylvain Palhies

13 November 2015	Créteil (2)	0–1	Valenciennes (2)	Créteil
19:00 CET			Mbenza 67'	Stadium: Stade Dominique Duvauchelle; Referee: Olivier Husset

14 November 2015	A.S. Pirae (DH) (French Polynesia)	5–6 (a.e.t.)	Pontivy (5)	Pirae, Tahiti
14:00 UTC−10:00	Labaste 11' (pen.); Bennett 41'; Li Fung Kuee 55', 66'; Vahirua 76'		Matali 8'; Le Borgne 28'; Bray 52'; Diop 65', 84'; Péru 117'	Stadium: Stade Pater Te Hono Nui; Referee: Stephanie Frappart

14 November 2015	La Gacilly (8)	0–4	Les Herbiers (3)	La Gacilly
14:30 CET			Mayulu 21', 30'; Cropanese 64'; Bosque 79'	Stadium: Stade de la Croix des Archers; Referee: Nicolas Rodrigues

14 November 2015	Monts d'Or Azergues Foot (4)	1–3	Grenoble (4)	Chasselay
14:30 CET	M'Bida 32'		David 13'; Pinto-Borges 71'; Ahouré 86'	Stadium: Stade Ludovic Giuly; Referee: William Lavis

14 November 2015	Châteaubriant (4)	3–0	(Mayotte) M'zouazia (DH)	Châteaubriant
14:30 CET	Bloudeau 16'; Touré 24', 51'			Stadium: Stade de la Ville en Bois; Referee: Mike Denis

14 November 2015	Chambly (3)	1–0	(Martinique) Golden Star (DH)	Chambly
14:30 CET	Louisy-Daniel 79'			Stadium: Stade des Marais; Referee: Yann Flament

14 November 2015	Morne-à-l'Eau (DH) (Guadeloupe)	1–2	Maccabi Paris (5)	Les Abymes, Guadeloupe
15:00 AST (UTC−04:00)				Stadium: Stade René Serge Nabajoth; Referee: Hamid Guenaoui

14 November 2015	Mulhouse (4)	2–1	(Guadeloupe) CS Moulien (DH)	Mulhouse
15:00 CET	Ba 25'; Gausselan 39'		Bolmin 50'	Stadium: Stade de l'Ill; Referee: Aurelien Petit

14 November 2015	Consolat Marseille (3)	0–1	Évian Thonon Gaillard (2)	Marseille
15:30 CET	Gigliotti (red card) 76'		Bruno 29'	Stadium: Stade de la Martine; Referee: Olivier Thual

14 November 2015	Berre (7)	1–2	Bourg-Péronnas (2)	Berre-l'Étang
16:00 CET	Ahmed 48'		Boussaha 33', 55'	Stadium: Stade Roger Martin; Referee: Eric Wattellier

14 November 2015	Muret (6)	3–1	Colomiers (4)	Muret
16:00 CET	Graciet 3'; Aglar 34', 73'; De Faria (red card) 72'		Corominas 34'	Stadium: Stade Clément Ader; Referee: Guy Gregory Prevot

14 November 2015	Dinsheim (6)	2–4	Nancy (2)	Molsheim
17:00 CET	Ehrismann 37'; Perez 82'		Chrétien 5'; Robic 41'; Mabella 69', 76'	Stadium: Parc Des Sports Stadium; Referee: Nicolas Dzubanowski

14 November 2015	Stade Bordelais (4)	2–0	Thiers (5)	Le Bouscat
17:00 CET	Lavie 19'; Gostisbehere 90+3'			Stadium: Stade Ste Germaine; Referee: Remi Naudinet

14 November 2015	Agouado (DH) (French Guiana)	0–4	Lège Cap Ferret (5)	Remire-Montjoly, French Guiana
17:00 GFT (UTC−03:00)			Pigrée 10'; Samb 38'; Cantero 49'; Digon 84'	Stadium: Stade Municipal Dr. Edmard Lama; Referee: Romain Delpech

14 November 2015	Chassieu Décines (7)	0–4	Besançon FC (5)	Décines-Charpieu
18:00 CET			Louhkiar 16'; Crolet 27'; Golliard 69'; Bouhila 87'	Stadium: Parc Des Sports R. Troussier; Referee: Julien Schmitt

14 November 2015	Magny (6)	0–1	Sarre-Union (4)	Metz
18:00 CET			Bénédick 57'	Stadium: Stade du Plateau; Referee: Julien Schmitt

14 November 2015	Selongey (5)	1–4	Colmar (3)	Selongey
18:00 CET	Mangione 4'		Diawara 42', 43'; Chéré 80'; Burel 82'	Stadium: Stade des Courvelles; Referee: Dimitri Kristo

14 November 2015	Louhans-Cuiseaux (6)	0–2	Villefranche-sur-Saône (4)	Louhans
18:00 CET			Bando 5', 37'	Stadium: Stade du Bram; Referee: Alexandre Mercier

14 November 2015	Montélimar (6)	0–0 (8–7 p)	Échirolles (6)	Montélimar
18:00 CET				Stadium: Stade Alexandre Tropenas; Referee: Jeremie Pignard

14 November 2015	Besançon RC (5)	2–1	Jura Sud Lavans (4)	Besançon
18:00 CET	Grand 32' (pen.), 40'		Miranda 58' (pen.); Morel (red card) 73'	Stadium: Stade Léo Lagrange; Referee: Thierry Bouille

14 November 2015	Gières (7)	0–3 (a.e.t.)	Annecy (5)	Annecy
18:00 CET			Julliard 100'; Meguireche 112', 116'	Stadium: Parc des Sports Paul Bourgeat; Referee: Nicolas Meyer

14 November 2015	Espaly (7)	1–3	Fréjus Saint-Raphaël (3)	Le Puy-en-Velay
18:00 CET	Féres 40'		Reynaud 5', 55'; Hennion 65'	Stadium: Stade Charles Massot; Referee: Mickael Leleu

14 November 2015	La Suze-sur-Sarthe (6)	1–2	Laval (2)	La Suze-sur-Sarthe
18:00 CET	Daniel 45'		Viale 2'; Alla 43'	Stadium: Stade Daniel Soyer; Referee: Cédric Dos Santos

14 November 2015	Changé (5)	2–2 (3–4 p)	TA Rennes (5)	Changé
18:00 CET	Loudifa 78'; Do Marcolino 90+2'		Caroff 16', 18'	Stadium: Stade Auguste Dalibard; Referee: Fabien Brun

14 November 2015	Saint-Malo (4)	3–1	Red Star (2)	Saint-Malo
18:00 CET	Lahaye 6'; Maïga 85'; Creach 90+2'		Lefaix 35'	Stadium: Stade de Marville; Referee: Romain Galibert

14 November 2015	Lyon-Duchère (4)	2–1	Andrézieux (5)	Lyon
18:00 CET	Ezikian 55'; Sbaï 63'		Ouammou 58'; Robert (red card) 62'	Stadium: Stade de Balmont; Referee: Faouzi Benchabane

14 November 2015	Montagnarde (6)	0–3	Brest (2)	Inzinzac-Lochrist
18:00 CET			Sea 32'; Alphonse 83'; Battocchio 90'	Stadium: Stade Mané Braz; Referee: François Letexier

14 November 2015	Toulouse Saint-Jo (6)	2–4 (a.e.t.)	Montauban (7)	Toulouse
18:00 CET	Doukaini 1', 66'		Aouladchaib 85', 120'; Ouali (88); Ruffin (90)	Stadium: Stade Pierre Cahuzac; Referee: Sofien Benchabane

14 November 2015	Granville (5)	2–0	Dives (6)	Granville
18:00 CET	Vauvy 16', 76'			Stadium: Stade Louis Dior; Referee: Marc Michout

14 November 2015	La Rochelle (6)	1–5	Chamois Niortais (2)	La Rochelle
18:00 CET	Kahramanca 78'		Batisse 18'; Daubin 39'; Selemani 43'; Koné 49', 60'	Stadium: Stade François Le Parco; Attendance: 1,500; Referee: Yohann Rouinsard

14 November 2015	Limoges (5)	2–1	Auxerre (2)	Limoges
18:00 CET	Paillot 12'; Orengo 67'		Puygrenier 90'	Stadium: Stade Saint-Lazare; Referee: Sebastien Butault

14 November 2015	Saint-Omer (6)	2–0	Le Havre (2)	Saint-Omer
18:00 CET	Kociszewski 19'; Perrault 38'			Stadium: Stade Gaston Bonnet; Referee: Romain Lissorgue

14 November 2015	Hazebrouck (6)	4–2	Aubervilliers (4)	Hazebrouck
18:00 CET	Da Silva 5'; Musuamba 17', 32', 33'		Lapouge 27'; Tomasevic 87'	Stadium: Stade Auguste Demette; Referee: Maxime Apruzzese

14 November 2015	Béthune (6)	0–2	AC Amiens (4)	Béthune
18:00 CET			Akichi 75'; Samb 90+4'	Stadium: Stade Léo Lagrange; Referee: Akim Abdelhaoui

14 November 2015	Saint-Lô (5)	0–2	(Réunion) US Sainte-Marienne (DH)	Saint-Lô
18:00 CET			M'Doihoma 56'; Gladyson 64'	Stadium: Stade Louis Villemer; Referee: Stephane Bar

14 November 2015	Saint-Nazaire (6)	2–1	Viry-Châtillon (4)	Saint-Nazaire
18:30 CET	Moussa 15', 85'		75'	Stadium: Parc Des Sports Léo Lagrange N°1; Referee: Jean Francois Eveno

14 November 2015	Saint-Sauveur (7)	1–7	Orléans (3)	Bressuire
18:30 CET	G. Noirault 71'		Delonglée 8'; Pépé 13'; Armand 42', 48'; Gomis 51'; Camara 59'; Opa 83'	Stadium: Stade Alain Métayer; Attendance: 500; Referee: Florent Baconnet

14 November 2015	ASPTT Cholet (10)	0–3	Vertou (5)	Cholet
18:30 CET			David 16', 59'; Freneau 17'	Stadium: Stade Omnisports Jean Bouin; Referee: Thibaut Hervieux

14 November 2015	Luçon (3)	2–3 (a.e.t.)	Moulins (4)	Luçon
18:30 CET	Buaillon (red card) 81'; Ringayen 86', 90+5'		M. Alouache 28'; Franco 90+3'; Cuvier 113'	Stadium: Stade Jean de Mouzon; Referee: Bastien Dechepy

14 November 2015	Olympique Saumur (6)	0–2	Tours (2)	Saumur
19:00 CET			Bosetti 33'; Agouazi 53'	Stadium: Stade des Rives du Thouet; Referee: Alexandre Castro

14 November 2015	FC Libourne (6)	1–1 (a.e.t.) (5–4 p)	Bourges 18 (5)	Libourne
19:00 CET	Liassidji 15'		Miranda 57'	Stadium: Stade Jean-Antoine Moueix; Referee: Bruno Gaetan Fouquet

14 November 2015	Nord (9)	0–1	Volvic (6)	Marans
19:00 CET			(33)	Stadium: Stade Municipal; Referee: Sylvain Barcella

14 November 2015	Veyle Saône (7)	0–9	Dijon FCO (2)	Péronnas
19:00 CET			Mainfroi 4' (o.g.); Lees-Melou 12', 21', 79'; Jullien 17'; Benet 33'; Saïd 41', 56'; Thiam 60'	Stadium: Stade Municipal; Referee: Abdelatif Kherradji

14 November 2015	Bourges Foot (6)	2–2 (a.e.t.) (3–4 p)	Guéret (7)	Bourges
19:30 CET				Stadium: Stade Yves du Manoir; Referee: Yohan Gagnant

14 November 2015	Golden Lion (DH (Martinique) )	1–1 (a.e.t.) (12–11 p)	Noisy-le-Sec (5)	Saint-Joseph
19:30 UTC−04:00	Goron 12'		Yatim 63'	Stadium: Stade Pierre Aliker; Referee: Alexandre Perreau Niel

14 November 2015	AFC Creil (7)	1–4	Sedan (3)	Creil
20:00 CET	Arkine 31'		Goba 19', 87'; Rocchi 54'; Oudrhiri 64'	Stadium: Stade Vélodrome; Referee: Benjamin Lepaysant

14 November 2015	Rostrenen (8)	0–3	Rennes Brequigny (6)	Carhaix-Plouguer
20:00 CET			Rachdi 70', 86'; Nadjitam Padja 83'	Stadium: Stade Charles Pinson; Referee: Jordan Riche

14 November 2015	Épernay (5)	3–2	(New Caledonia) Hienghène Sport (DH)	Épernay
20:30 CET	54' (pen.), 67', 82' (pen.)		Kabeu 5'; Kaï 40'	Stadium: Stade Paul Chandon; Referee: Romain Zamo

15 November 2015	Sarreguemines (5)	2–1 (a.e.t.)	Schiltigheim (5)	Sarreguemines
14:00 CET	T. Hassli 41'; Wengert 96'		Bertoli 58'	Stadium: Stade de la Blies; Referee: Alexandre Decoster

15 November 2015	Clouange (8)	0–3	Raon-l'Étape (5)	Clouange
14:00 CET			Bassilekin 30', 80'; Dufour 49'	Stadium: Stade Marcel Bellinger; Referee: Rabir Naas

15 November 2015	Hauts Lyonnais (7)	2–0	Saint-Dié (6)	Feurs
14:00 CET	Ghoulam 16'; Molière 90+4'			Stadium: Stade Maurice Rousson; Referee: Abdelkarim Bouzalmat

15 November 2015	Réding (9)	0–2	Schirrhein (7)	Réding
14:00 CET			Reppert 30', 45'	Stadium: Stade Municipal; Referee: Damien Rossini

15 November 2015	Saint-Jean Beaulieu (7)	3–0	Istres (7)	Saint-Jean-Cap-Ferrat
14:00 CET	Gignoli 32', 46'; Tahtouh 90'			Stadium: Stade Intercommunal Beaulieu; Referee: Guillaume Janin

15 November 2015	Toulouse Rodéo (6)	2–0	Perpignan (6)	Toulouse
14:00 CET	Viltard 2'; Aouada 63'			Stadium: Stade Robert Barran; Referee: David Mezouar

15 November 2015	Vic-le-Comte (8)	0–3	Genêts Anglet (5)	Vic-le-Comte
14:00 CET			Sauvestre 36'; N'Gadi 75'; Dogo 80'	Stadium: Stade André Boste; Referee: Cédric Mouysset

15 November 2015	Marck (5)	2–1	Amiens (3)	Marck
14:00 CET	Dewet 19'; Dezègue 36'		Créhin 80'	Stadium: Stade Jean-Claude Agneray; Referee: Emmanuel Esneu

15 November 2015	Vimy (7)	1–3	Ailly-sur-Somme (5)	Vimy
14:00 CET	Lucas 48'		Thiam 33'; Delcluse 80'; Demetz 85'	Stadium: Stade François Blin; Referee: Steeve Zabeau

15 November 2015	Balaruc-les-Bains (7)	1–7	Mont-de-Marsan (4)	Fabrègues
14:00 CET	75'		Labarbe 5'; Gasparotto 30', 32', 55', 82'; Lafourcade 45'; Lafille 78'	Stadium: Stade Joseph Jeanton; Referee: Vincent Teulet

15 November 2015	Prix-lès-Mézières (6)	0–0 (a.e.t.) (2–4 p)	Wasquehal (4)	Prix-lès-Mézières
14:00 CET				Stadium: Stade de la Poterie; Referee: Cyril Orta

15 November 2015	Borgo (5)	0–1	Beauvais (5)	Borgo
14:00 CET			Camara 80'	Stadium: Stade Paul Antoniotti; Referee: Jules Telliez

15 November 2015	Saint-Amand (6)	0–1	Croix (4)	Saint-Amand-les-Eaux
14:00 CET			De Araujo 79'	Stadium: Stade Municipal; Referee: Mathieu Grin

15 November 2015	Mons-en-Barœul (8)	3–4 (a.e.t.)	Maubeuge (6)	Mons-en-Barœul
14:00 CET	30'; Gomez 41'; 45'		Bellal 4'; Safi 8'; Lenoir 67'; Lebrun 117'	Stadium: Stade de Lattre de Tassigny; Referee: Sébastien Crampon

15 November 2015	Orvault (6)	3–1	Saint-Saturnin Arche (6)	Orvault
14:30 CET	Caradec 39', 50'; Houssais 45'; Brenugat (red card) 61'		Fagault 9' (pen.)	Stadium: Stade de Gagné; Referee: Lakhdar El Bedoui

15 November 2015	Liffré (9)	2–2 (a.e.t.) (2–4 p)	Saint-Renan (8)	Liffré
14:30 CET	Domingos 34'; Ambrosio 105+1'		Sakho 90+2', 91'	Stadium: Stade Nelson Paillou; Referee: Brice Pla

15 November 2015	Panazol (10)	0–10	Trélissac (4)	Panazol
14:30 CET	Sar-Temsoury (red card) 18'		Papin 8', 10', 43', 53'; Keyta 21', 34'; Desenclos (red card) 44'; Ben Tairi 61' (pen.); De Cler 62', 77'; Duféal 74'	Stadium: Stade de Morpiènas; Referee: Clément Dujardin

15 November 2015	Yvetot (7)	2–0	Douai (8)	Yvetot
14:30 CET	Dago 45', 52'			Stadium: Stade Municipal; Referee: Lionel Rabah

15 November 2015	Sens (5)	0–3	Chantilly (6)	Sens
14:30 CET			Badirou 9'; Dansoko 50' (pen.), 82'	Stadium: Stade Fernand Sastre; Referee: Steeve Gérard Dubec

15 November 2015	La Chapelle Montgermont (7)	0–4	Concarneau (4)	Montgermont
14:30 CET			N'Doye 17'; Cabon 20'; Toupin 55'; Koré 63'	Stadium: Stade Émile Chevalier; Referee: Pierre Lixon

15 November 2015	Mantes (4)	4–0	(French Guiana) Iracoubo (DH)	Mantes-la-Ville
14:30 CET	Lux 28'; Massampu 30'; Dembélé 45'; 75' (o.g.)

15 November 2015	Ebersheim (9)	1–2	Pagny-sur-Moselle (5)	Erstein
15:00 CET	15'		Deghnouche 60'; Donisa 89'	Stadium: Stade Municipal; Referee: Stéphane More

15 November 2015	APM Metz (6)	0–3	Saint-Louis Neuweg (4)	Metz
15:00 CET			Jennane 25', 62'; Noucier 53'	Stadium: Stade Émile Weinberg; Referee: Antoine Grare

15 November 2015	AS Excelsior (DH (Réunion) )	1–0 (a.e.t.)	Poissy (4)	Saint-Pierre, Réunion
17:00 CET	El Madaghri 94'			Stadium: Stade Michel Volnay; Referee: Jérémy Stinat

15 November 2015	Sète (4)	0–1	Béziers (3)	Sète
17:00 CET			Soukouna 86'	Stadium: Stade Louis Michel; Referee: Didier Falcone

20 November 2015	US Quevilly-Rouen (4)	2–1	RC Lens (2)	Le Petit-Quevilly
20:00 CET	Guezoui 6' (pen.); Colinet 80'		Bourigeaud 40'	Stadium: Stade Amable-et-Micheline-Lozai; Referee: Willy Delajod

20 November 2015	FC Sochaux-Montbéliard (2)	2–1 (a.e.t.)	RC Strasbourg (3)	Montbéliard
20:45 CET	Martin 14'; Tardieu (red card) 41'; Toko-Ekambi 96'		Pouye 22' (pen.); Blondel (red card) 57'	Stadium: Stade Auguste Bonal; Referee: Florent Batta

21 November 2015	Brétigny (7)	1–2	AC Ajaccio (2)	Brétigny
14:00 CET	15'		Madri 29'; Toudic 87'

21 November 2015	Reims Sainte-Anne (6)	0–3	Dunkerque (3)	Cormontreuil
14:00 CET			De Parmentier 22' (pen.); El Hamzaoui 58'; Moussiti-Oko 80'	Stadium: Stade Robert Pires

21 November 2015	CMS Oissel (5)	0–0 (a.e.t.) (4–5 p)	Paris FC (2)	Oissel
14:00 CET				Stadium: Stade Marcel Billard

21 November 2015	Frontignan AC (6)	0–0 (a.e.t.) (4–5 p)	Nîmes (2)	Frontignan
14:00 CET
	Penalties
	El Hajaoui (penalty scored); Jelloul (penalty scored); Minvielle (penalty scored); Beffrieu (penalty scored)		Lacourt (penalty scored); Bobichon (penalty scored); Ripart (penalty scored); Desprès (penalty scored); Marin (penalty scored)

21 November 2015	Versailles (6)	0–0 (a.e.t.) (4–5 p)	Le Blanc-Mesnil (6)	Versailles
14:00 CET

21 November 2015	Paimpol (7)	0–2	Avranches (3)	Paimpol
14:30 CET			Théault 29'; Thiaré 75'	Stadium: Stade Charles Boursier

21 November 2015	Sannois Saint-Gratien (4)	3–2	Saint-Ouen l'Aumône (5)	Saint-Gratien
17:00 CET	Koné 45' (pen.); Traoré 70'; Ebuya 89'		Akueson 27'; Mafouta 61'	Stadium: Stade Michel Hidalgo

21 November 2015	Gonfreville (5)	0–6	Boulogne (3)	Gonfreville-l'Orcher
18:00 CET			Thil 8'; Mercier 45'; Hebras 57'; Lopy 80'; Daury 88'; Niangbo 90'	Stadium: Stade Maurice Baquet; Referee: Philippe Lucas

21 November 2015	Saint-Brieuc (5)	1–0 (a.e.t.)	Fougères (5)	Saint-Brieuc
18:30 CET	Aboubakari 96' (pen.)			Stadium: Stade Fred Aubert; Referee: Jerome Guillou

14 November 2015	Mainvilliers (7)	5–3	L'Île-Rousse (5)	Mainvilliers
20:00 CET	N'Sindila 10'; De Aveiro 17', 50', 90'; Lochon 19'		Sauli 30'; Moracchini 37'; Moretti 43'	Stadium: Stade Bernard Maroquin; Referee: Julien Jamet

22 November 2015	FC Pontcharra Saint-Loup (10)	2–1	Limonest (6)	Limonest
14:30 CET	Lefita 45', 82'		De Sousa 68'

== Eighth Round ==
The draw was held on 18 November 2015. The matches were played on 5 and 6 December 2015

5 December 2015	AC Ajaccio (2)	0–0 (a.e.t.) (3–2 p)	(Réunion) AS Excelsior (DH)	Ajaccio
13:30 CET				Stadium: Stade François Coty; Referee: Mickaël Leleu

5 December 2015	RC Besançon (5)	2–1 (a.e.t.)	(Martinique) Golden Lion (DH)	Besançon
15:30 CET	Troudart 84'; Lafrance 110'		Nattes 86'	Stadium: Stade Léo Lagrange; Referee: Julien Jamet

5 December 2015	Sainte-Marienne (DH) (Réunion)	2–2 (a.e.t.) (3–0 p)	Vertou (5)	Saint-Denis
16:00 (UTC +4)	Rakotondrabe 1'; Damour 60'		Delanoë 69'; Freneau 74'	Stadium: Stade Jean-Ivoula; Referee: Alexandre Castro

5 December 2015	Sarreguemines (5)	2–1	Dijon (2)	Sarreguemines
16:00 CET	M'Barki 53', 58'		Tavares 34'	Stadium: Stade de la Blies; Referee: Hamid Guenaoui

5 December 2015	Montélimar (6)	1–2	Bourg-Péronnas (2)	Montélimar
16:00 CET	Liongo 37'		Ba 27'; Ogier 76'	Stadium: Stade Alexandre Tropenas; Referee: Willy Delajod

5 December 2015	Pontcharra Saint-Loup (10)	0–5	Annecy (5)	Chasselay
16:00 CET			Desbiolles 30' (pen.); Meguireche 44', 80', 90'; Carcenac 86'	Stadium: Stade Ludovic Giuly; Referee: Romain Zamo

5 December 2015	Saint-Louis Neuweg (4)	2–3	Mulhouse (4)	Saint-Louis
17:00 CET	Dardouri 41' (o.g.); Crequit 79'		Genghini 4', 49'; Ba 12'	Stadium: Stade de la Frontière; Referee: Thierry Bouille

5 December 2015	Béziers (3)	0–1	Fréjus Saint-Raphaël (3)	Béziers
17:00 CET			Hennion 77'	Stadium: Stade de la Méditerranée; Referee: Aurélien Petit

5 December 2015	Limoges (5)	2–1	Lège Cap Ferret (5)	Limoges
17:00 CET	Azouz 58'; Paillot 87'		Samb 88'	Stadium: Stade Saint-Lazare; Referee: Bruno Gaëtan Fouquet

5 December 2015	Le Blanc-Mesnil (6)	3–0	Mainvilliers (7)	Le Blanc-Mesnil
17:00 CET	Ngo Baheng 17'; Nsimba 57'; Benghadila 84'			Stadium: Stade Jean-Bouin; Referee: Stéphane Bar

5 December 2015	Sannois Saint-Gratien (4)	2–1 (a.e.t.)	Quevilly-Rouen (4)	Saint-Gratien
18:00 CET	Etshimi 63', 104'		Guezoui 38'	Stadium: Stade Michel Hidalgo; Referee: Sébastien Butault

5 December 2015	Saint-Malo (4)	3–0	Pontivy (5)	Saint-Malo
18:00 CET	Maiga 16', 90'; Lahaye 60'			Stadium: Stade de Marville; Referee: Mike Denis

5 December 2015	Villefranche (4)	1–0	Grenoble (4)	Villefranche-sur-Saône
18:00 CET	Bando 1'			Stadium: Stade Armand Chouffet; Referee: Florent Batta

5 December 2015	Chamois Niortais (2)	3–1	Les Herbiers (3)	Niort
18:00 CET	Roye 4'; Rocheteau 16'; Koné 78'		Glombard 52'	Stadium: Stade René Gaillard; Referee: Stéphanie Frappart

5 December 2015	Lyon-Duchère (4)	0–1	Évian TG (2)	Lyon
18:00 CET			Keita 69'	Stadium: Stade de Balmont; Referee: Karim Abed

5 December 2015	Muret (6)	3–0	Montauban (7)	Muret
18:00 CET	Michel 3'; Graciet 63'; Aglar 83'			Stadium: Stade Clément Ader; Referee: Guillaume Janin

5 December 2015	Volvic (6)	4–2	Guéret (7)	Volvic
18:00 CET	Magne 36'; Ceresa 67'; Delaspre 68'; Barbat 79'		Leclerq 48'; Bourdeau 90+2'	Stadium: Stade Michel Champleboux; Referee: Rémi Naudinet

5 December 2015	Épernay (5)	1–1 (a.e.t.) (6–5 p)	FC Besançon (5)	Épernay
18:00 CET	Merbah 65'		Rabasse 83'	Stadium: Stade Paul Chandon; Referee: Steeve Gérard Dubec
	Penalties
	Blachon (penalty scored); Deruffe (penalty scored); Gaultier (penalty scored); Chicaut (penalty scored); Leonard (penalty scored) (penalty scored)		Louhkiar (penalty scored); Gégout (penalty scored); Courtot (penalty scored); Pesenti (penalty scored); Bouhila (penalty scored); Rabasse (penalty missed)

5 December 2015	Paris FC (2)	1–3	Boulogne (3)	Paris
18:00 CET	Bahamboula 86'		Thil 9', 11'; Pandor 19'	Stadium: Stade Charléty; Referee: Olivier Thual

5 December 2015	Mantes (4)	2–0	Marck (5)	Mantes-la-Ville
18:00 CET	B. Preira 12' (pen.); Massampu 90'			Stadium: Stade Aimé Bergeal; Referee: Jérémie Pignard

5 December 2015	Sedan (3)	2–1	Croix (4)	Sedan
18:00 CET	Seck 25'; Correa 90'		Dumortier 39'	Stadium: Stade Louis Dugauguez; Referee: Sylvain Palhies

5 December 2015	Maubeuge (6)	0–1	AC Amiens (4)	Maubeuge
18:00 CET			Lebrun 87'	Stadium: Stade Léo Lagrange; Referee: Olivier Esneu

5 December 2015	Raon-l'Étape (5)	1–1 (a.e.t.) (5–4 p)	Colmar (3)	Raon-l'Étape
18:00 CET	Bassilekin 68'		Gbizié 3'	Stadium: Stade Paul Gasser; Referee: Abdelatif Kherradji
	Penalties
	Teti (penalty scored); Clauss (penalty scored); Bassilekin (penalty missed); Povoa (penalty scored); Hsini (penalty scored); Abderrahmane (penalty scored)		Diawara (penalty scored); Chéré (penalty scored); Touré (penalty scored); Soubervie (penalty missed); Gbizié (penalty scored); Varsovie (penalty missed)

5 December 2015	Concarneau (4)	2–0	Châteaubriant (4)	Concarneau
18:30 CET	Gégousse 71'; Koré 90'			Stadium: Stade Guy Piriou; Referee: Benjamin Lepaysant

5 December 2015	Hazebrouck (6)	0–1	Dunkerque (3)	Hazebrouck
18:30 CET			Bayard 7'	Stadium: Stade Auguste Damette; Referee: Gérard Dany

5 December 2015	Saint-Brieuc (5)	2–0	Brest (2)	Saint-Brieuc
18:30 CET	Le Mehauté 7'; Quemper 29'			Stadium: Stade Fred Aubert; Referee: Yohann Rouinsard

5 December 2015	Moulins (4)	1–0	Nîmes (2)	Moulins
18:30 CET	M. Alouache 79'			Stadium: Stade Hector Rolland; Referee: Thomas Leonard

5 December 2015	Trélissac (4)	1–0	Clermont (2)	Trélissac
18:30 CET	Cavaniol 6'			Stadium: Stade Firmin Daudou; Referee: François Letexier

5 December 2015	Mont-de-Marsan (4)	2–1	Genêts Anglet (5)	Mont-de-Marsan
19:00 CET	Gasparoto 11'; Lafourcade 14'		N'Gadi 57'	Stadium: Stade de l'Argenté; Referee: Éric Wattellier

5 December 2015	CPBB Rennes (6)	1–4	Laval (2)	Rennes
19:00 CET	Nadjitam Padja 45'		Nazon 24', 42'; Etinof 74'; Malonga 78'	Stadium: Stade Roger Salengro; Referee: Olivier Husset

5 December 2015	Chambly (3)	4–3	Orléans (3)	Chambly
19:00 CET	Martin 50', 68'; Popelard 72'; G. Doucouré 81'		Dupuis 7', 63'; Armand 32'	Stadium: Stade des Marais; Referee: Mehdi Mokhtari

5 December 2015	Toulouse Rodéo (6)	1–0	Stade Bordelais (4)	Toulouse
19:00 CET	Sid 11'			Stadium: Stade des Fontaines; Referee: Nicolas Rodrigues

5 December 2015	Libourne (6)	0–2 (a.e.t.)	Tours (2)	Libourne
19:00 CET			Malfleury 115'; Tandia 120'	Stadium: Stade Jean-Antoine Moueix; Referee: Romain Galibert

5 December 2015	Beauvais (5)	1–2 (a.e.t.)	Valenciennes (2)	Beauvais
19:00 CET	Camara 85'		Diarra 29'; Missi Mezu 105'	Stadium: Stade Pierre Brisson; Referee: Romain Lissorgue

6 December 2015	Chantilly (6)	3–1	Ailly-sur-Somme (5)	Orry-la-Ville
13:30 CET	Dansoko 11' (pen.); Mvondo 45'; Badirou 83'		Chappe 69'	Stadium: Stade Intercommunal; Referee: Emmanuel Caron

6 December 2015	Pagny-sur-Moselle (5)	1–0	Maccabi Paris (5)	Pagny-sur-Moselle
13:45 CET	Deghnouche 80'			Stadium: Stade Omnisports 2000; Referee: Yann Flament

6 December 2015	Hauts Lyonnais (7)	1–3	Saint-Jean Beaulieu (7)	Feurs
14:00 CET	Bourrin 79'		Audel 6'; Meddour 41'; Ferreri 90+2'	Stadium: Stade Maurice Rousson; Referee: Cyril Orta

6 December 2015	Orvault (6)	1–5	Avranches (3)	Orvault
14:00 CET	Perdoncin 55'		Thiaré 18', 50'; Théault 47'; Niakité 60' (pen.), 70'	Stadium: Stade de Gagné; Referee: Bastien Dechepy

6 December 2015	Saint-Renan (8)	0–4	TA Rennes (5)	Saint-Renan
14:00 CET	Tchafack (red card) 44'		Calvez 11'; Messouter 45'; Bardot Brand 64'; Desvignes 80'	Stadium: Stade Abbé Le Gall; Referee: Florent Baconnet

6 December 2015	Sochaux (2)	1–0 (a.e.t.)	Nancy (2)	Montbéliard
14:15 CET	Teikeu 97'			Stadium: Stade Auguste Bonal; Referee: Floris Aubin

6 December 2015	Yvetot (7)	1–2	Saint-Omer (6)	Yvetot
14:30 CET	Fabrice 72'		Willot 44'; Bourabi 88'	Stadium: Stade Municipal; Referee: Philippe Lucas

6 December 2015	Schirrhein (7)	1–6	Sarre-Union (4)	Bischwiller
14:30 CET	Joly 22'		Keita 5'; Dje 9'; Benedick 60', 77'; Schermann 64'; Belktaki 80'	Stadium: Stade des Pins; Referee: Antoine Grare

6 December 2015	Wasquehal (4)	2–1	Metz (2)	Croix
15:00 CET	Sadsaoud 11'; Bouradja 73'		Mayuka 87'	Stadium: Stade Henri Seigneur; Referee: Romain Delpech

6 December 2015	Saint-Nazaire (6)	0–2	Granville (5)	Saint-Nazaire
16:00 CET			Vauvy 29'; Peron 75'	Stadium: Stade Léo Lagrange; Referee: Jérôme Guillou

== Round of 64 ==
Matches played on 2, 3 and 4 January 2016.

2 January 2016	GFC Ajaccio (1)	2–0	(Réunion) US Sainte-Marienne (DH)	Ajaccio
13:30 CET	Larbi 32'; Mayi 80'			Stadium: Stade Ange Casanova; Referee: Lionel Jaffredo

2 January 2016	Avranches (3)	1–1 (a.e.t.) (1–3 p)	Saint-Malo (4)	Avranches
15:00 CET	C. Boateng 30'		Maiga 65'	Stadium: Stade René Fenouillère; Referee: Jérémy Stinat

2 January 2016	Le Blanc-Mesnil (6)	0–2	Nantes (1)	Saint-Ouen
15:30 CET			Thomasson 40'; Adryan 69'	Stadium: Stade Bauer; Referee: Olivier Husset

2 January 2016	Concarneau (4)	3–0	TA Rennes (5)	Concarneau
16:00 CET	Richetin 23' (pen.); Drouglazet 35'; N'Doye 88'			Stadium: Stade Guy Piriou; Referee: Jérôme Brisard

2 January 2016	Villefranche (4)	1–2	Sarre-Union (4)	Villefranche-sur-Saône
17:00 CET	Zerbini 74' (o.g.)		Benchenane 12'; Benedick 38'	Stadium: Stade Armand Chouffet; Referee: Sylvain Palhies

2 January 2016	Chambly (3)	4–1	Reims (1)	Chambly
18:00 CET	Louisy-Daniel 5', 9', 43'; Touati 49'		de Préville 90' (pen.)	Stadium: Stade des Marais; Referee: Benoît Millot

2 January 2016	Sannois-Saint-Gratien (4)	0–5	Toulouse (1)	Saint-Gratien
18:00 CET			Ben Yedder 18'; Trejo 32'; Braithwaite 38', 56'; Somália 54'	Stadium: Stade Michel Hidalgo; Referee: François Letexier

2 January 2016	Dunkerque (3)	3–4 (a.e.t.)	Troyes (1)	Dunkerque
18:00 CET	Fofana 13'; Cvitković 63'; Tchokounté 94'		Jessy Pi 7', 116'; Thiago Xavier 49'; Camus 96'	Stadium: Stade Tribut; Referee: Romain Delpech

2 January 2016	Besançon RC (5)	1–3	Angers (1)	Besançon
18:00 CET	Grand 86'		Traoré 6'; Ndoye 17'; Diers 67'	Stadium: Stade Léo Lagrange; Referee: Didier Falcone

2 January 2016	Pagny-sur-Moselle (5)	0–2	Sochaux (2)	Blénod-lès-Pont-à-Mousson
18:00 CET			Cacérès 7', 24'	Stadium: Stade des Fonderies; Referee: Wilfried Bien

2 January 2016	Mantes (4)	2–0	Saint-Brieuc (5)	Mantes-la-Ville
18:00 CET	Massampu 57'; Preira 90+3'			Stadium: Stade Aimé Bergeal; Attendance: Alexandre Perreau Niel

2 January 2016	Granville (5)	2–1	Laval (2)	Granville
18:00 CET	Theault 13'; Lambard 29'		Nazon 71'	Stadium: Stade Louis Dior; Referee: Yohann Rouinsard

2 January 2016	Moulins (4)	1–2	Chamois Niortais (2)	Moulins
18:30 CET	Cuvier 20'		Ndoh 6'; Roye 45' (pen.)	Stadium: Stade Hector Rolland; Referee: Florent Batta

2 January 2016	Toulouse Rodéo (6)	0–1	Mont-de-Marsan (4)	Toulouse
19:00 CET			Lafourcade 1'	Stadium: Stade des Fontaines; Referee: Karim Abed

2 January 2016	Sedan (3)	0–2	Bastia (1)	Sedan
20:45 CET			Brandão 66'; Danic 90+1'	Stadium: Stade Louis Dugauguez; Referee: Frank Schneider

3 January 2016	Épernay (5)	0–1	Montpellier (1)	Épernay
14:15 CET			Yatabaré 62'	Stadium: Stade Paul Chandon; Referee: Alexandre Castro

3 January 2016	Raon-l'Étape (5)	1–1 (a.e.t.) (3–4 p)	Saint-Étienne (1)	Raon-l'Étape
14:15 CET	Clauss 58'		Maupay 23'	Stadium: Stade Paul Gasser; Referee: Sébastien Moreira

3 January 2016	Fréjus Saint-Raphaël (3)	2–3	Bordeaux (1)	Saint-Raphaël
14:15 CET	Gendrey 32', 54'		Diabaté 36', 76'; Rolan 90+1'	Stadium: Stade Louis Hon; Referee: Johan Hamel

3 January 2016	Lorient (1)	3–2 (a.e.t.)	Tours (2)	Lorient
14:15 CET	Waris 26'; Philippoteaux 57'; Jeannot 99'		Tandia 50'; Belkebla 64'	Stadium: Stade du Moustoir; Referee: Ruddy Buquet

3 January 2016	Limoges (5)	0–7	Lyon (1)	Buxerolles
14:15 CET			Cornet 2', 37'; Beauvue 50'; Ghezzal 57', 61'; Darder 71'; Tolisso 76'	Stadium: Stade Michel Amand; Referee: Bartolomeu Varela Teles

3 January 2016	Wasquehal (4)	0–1	Paris Saint-Germain (1)	Villeneuve-d'Ascq
14:15 CET			Ibrahimović 60'	Stadium: Stadium Lille Métropole; Referee: Mikaël Lisage

3 January 2016	Sarreguemines (5)	1–0	Valenciennes (2)	Sarreguemines
14:30 CET	M'Barki 20'			Stadium: Stade de la Blies; Referee: Aurélien Petit

3 January 2016	Muret (6)	0–2	Trélissac (4)	Muret
14:30 CET			Duféal 54'; Desenclos 70'	Stadium: Stade Clément Ader; Referee: William Lavis

3 January 2016	Annecy (5)	1–4 (a.e.t.)	Évian Thonon Gaillard (2)	Annecy
14:30 CET	Dechène 43'; Desbiolles (red card) 95'		Keita 31', 95' (pen.); Campanharo 105+1'; Touré 116'	Stadium: Parc des Sports; Referee: Hakim Ben El Hadj

3 January 2016	Volvic (6)	0–1	Ajaccio (2)	Riom
14:30 CET			Toudic 84'	Stadium: Stade Émile Pons; Referee: Floris Aubin

3 January 2016	Mulhouse (4)	1–3	Bourg-Péronnas (2)	Mulhouse
15:00 CET	Ras 90+1'		Boussaha 3'; Berthomier 25'; Sané 76'	Stadium: Stade de l'Ill; Referee: Thomas Leonard

3 January 2016	Chantilly (6)	0–4	Guingamp (1)	Senlis
16:00 CET			Privat 49'; Giresse 64'; Salibur 71'; Briand 75'	Stadium: Complexe Sportif; Referee: Hamid Guenaoui

3 January 2016	AC Amiens (4)	0–1	Lille (1)	Amiens
17:00 CET			Tallo 41' (pen.)	Stadium: Stade de la Licorne; Referee: Fredy Fautrel

3 January 2016	Saint-Omer (6)	2–2 (a.e.t.) (3–4 p)	Boulogne (3)	Saint-Omer
17:00 CET	Carney 45'; Willot 82'		Argelier 16'; Mercier 78'	Stadium: Stade Gaston Bonnet; Referee: Stéphanie Frappart

3 January 2016	Monaco (1)	10–2	Saint-Jean Beaulieu (7)	Monaco
18:00 CET	Traoré 21', 31', 34', 45', (red card) 45'; Raggi 29'; Bahlouli 48'; Fabinho 52' (pen.), 86' (pen.); Hélder Costa 54'; Pašalić 80'		Mariotti (red card) 45'; Leblanc 78'; Nardi 82' (o.g.)	Stadium: Stade Louis II; Referee: Nicolas Rainville

3 January 2016	Caen (1)	0–0 (a.e.t.) (1–3 p)	Marseille (1)	Caen
20:45 CET				Stadium: Stade Michel d'Ornano; Referee: Jérôme Miguelgorry
	Penalties
	Féret (penalty missed); Ben Youssef (penalty missed); Yahia (penalty scored); Bessat (penalty missed)		Diarra (penalty scored); Rolando (penalty scored); Batshuayi (penalty scored)

4 January 2016	Nice (1)	2–2 (a.e.t.) (6–7 p)	Rennes (1)	Nice
20:45 CET	Mendy 38'; Ben Arfa 117' (pen.)		Boga 83'; André 114'; Danzé (red card) 115'	Stadium: Allianz Riviera; Referee: Clément Turpin
	Penalties
	Ben Arfa (penalty scored); Seri (penalty scored); Mendy (penalty scored); Wallyson (penalty missed); Baysse (penalty scored); Genevois (penalty scored); Honorat (penalty missed); Boscagli (penalty scored); Lloris (penalty missed)		Quintero (penalty missed); Boga (penalty scored); Diagne (penalty scored); Dembélé (penalty scored); Armand (penalty scored); Janvier (penalty scored); André (penalty missed); M'Bengue (penalty scored); Fernandes (penalty scored)

== Round of 32 ==
Matches were played between 16 and 23 January 2016.

16 January 2016	Saint-Malo (4)	1–0	Mont-de-Marsan (4)	Saint-Malo
19:00 CET	Lahaye 72'			Stadium: Stade de Marville; Referee: Fredy Fautrel

19 January 2016	Rennes (1)	1–3	Bourg-Péronnas (2)	Rennes
18:00 CET	Moreira 20'		Bègue 48'; Boussaha 81'; Sané 90+2' (pen.)	Stadium: Roazhon Park; Referee: Antony Gautier

19 January 2016	Gazélec Ajaccio (1)	3–0	Guingamp (1)	Ajaccio
18:00 CET	Boutaïb 5', 22', 48'			Stadium: Stade Ange Casanova; Referee: Ruddy Buquet

19 January 2016	Angers (1)	1–2	Bordeaux (1)	Angers
18:30 CET	Ketkeophomphone 69'		Jussiê 45+1'; Crivelli 58'	Stadium: Stade Jean-Bouin; Referee: Stéphane Lannoy

19 January 2016	Sarre-Union (4)	1–0	Chamois Niortais (2)	Sarre-Union
19:00 CET	Schermann 90'			Stadium: Stade Omnisports; Referee: Hakim Ben El Hadj

19 January 2016	Bastia (1)	1–2	Sochaux (2)	Furiani
19:00 CET	Kamano 36'		Teikeu 27'; Cacérès 90+2'	Stadium: Stade Armand Cesari; Referee: Saïd Ennjimi

19 January 2016	Paris Saint-Germain (1)	2–1	Toulouse (1)	Paris
21:00 CET	David Luiz 54'; Ibrahimović 89' (pen.)		Moubandje 11'	Stadium: Parc des Princes; Referee: Tony Chapron

20 January 2016	Évian Thonon Gaillard (2)	1–3 (a.e.t.)	Monaco (1)	Annecy
18:30 CET	Kamin 63'		Traoré 45+1'; Pašalić 103'; Costa 119'	Stadium: Parc des Sports; Referee: Johan Hamel

20 January 2016	Trélissac (4)	1–1 (a.e.t.) (4–2 p)	Lille (1)	Périgueux
18:30 CET	Keyta 58'		Lopes 13'	Stadium: Stade Francis Rongieras; Referee: Bartolomeu Varela Teles
	Penalties
	Cavaniol (penalty missed); Papin (penalty scored); Burgho (penalty scored); Gnaleko (penalty scored); Desenclos (penalty scored)		(penalty missed) Benzia; (penalty missed) Lopes; (penalty scored) Civelli; (penalty scored) Sidibé

20 January 2016	Mantes (4)	0–1 (a.e.t.)	Nantes (1)	Mantes-la-Ville
18:30 CET			Bedoya 105+1'	Stadium: Stade Aimé Bergeal; Referee: Nicolas Rainville

20 January 2016	Chambly (3)	0–2	Lyon (1)	Chambly
18:30 CET			Cornet 20'; Valbuena 22'	Stadium: Stade Pierre Brisson; Referee: Stéphane Jochem

20 January 2016	Concarneau (4)	1–3	Troyes (1)	Concarneau
18:30 CET	Koré 68'		Jean (42); Azamoum 83'	Stadium: Stade Guy Piriou; Referee: Amaury Delerue

20 January 2016	Boulogne (3)	1–3 (a.e.t.)	Lorient (1)	Boulogne-sur-Mer
19:30 CET	Bonenfant 76'		Fofana 49'; Jeannot 102', 120+3'	Stadium: Stade de la Libération; Referee: Benoît Millot

20 January 2016	Marseille (1)	2–0	Montpellier (1)	Marseille
21:00 CET	Bensebaini 41' (o.g.); Dja Djédjé 54'			Stadium: Stade Vélodrome; Referee: Lionel Jaffredo

21 January 2016	Saint-Étienne (1)	2–1 (a.e.t.)	Ajaccio (2)	Saint-Étienne
21:00 CET	Bahebeck 10'; Corgnet 119'		Frikeche 86'	Stadium: Stade Geoffroy Guichard; Referee: Benoît Bastien

23 January 2016	Granville (5)	3–1	Sarreguemines (5)	Granville
18:00 CET	Vauvy 2', 84'; Jégu 90+2'		M'Barki 59'	Stadium: Stade Louis Dior; Referee: Jérôme Miguelgorry

== Round of 16 ==
Matches played on 9, 10 and 11 February 2016.

9 February 2016	Sochaux (2)	2–1	Monaco (1)	Montbéliard
21:00 CET	Martin 19'; Sacko 56'		Bakayoko 38'	Stadium: Stade Auguste Bonal

9 February 2016	Saint-Malo (4)	1–2	Gazélec Ajaccio (1)	Saint-Malo
21:00 CET	Creach 33'		Mayi 61'; Boutaïb 78'	Stadium: Stade de Marville

9 February 2016	Granville (5)	1–0 (a.e.t.)	Bourg-Péronnas (2)	Granville
21:00 CET	Untereiner 98'			Stadium: Stade Louis Dior

10 February 2016	Bordeaux (1)	3–4 (a.e.t.)	Nantes (1)	Bordeaux
19:00 CET	Crivelli 23'; Biyogo Poko 51'; Malcolm 98'		Bammou 6'; Sigþórsson 65'; Audel 115'; Bedoya 118'	Stadium: Nouveau Stade de Bordeaux

10 February 2016	Troyes (1)	1–2 (a.e.t.)	Saint-Étienne (1)	Troyes
19:00 CET	Nivet 78'		Tannane 62'; Maupay 107'	Stadium: Stade de l'Aube

10 February 2016	Sarre-Union (4)	0–4	Lorient (1)	Sarre-Union
19:00 CET			Jeannot 51', 90'; Fofana 74'; Barthelmé 81'	Stadium: Stade Omnisports

10 February 2016	Paris Saint-Germain (1)	3–0	Lyon (1)	Paris
21:05 CET	Ibrahimović 63', 67'; Rabiot 75'			Stadium: Parc des Princes

11 February 2016	Trélissac (4)	0−2	Marseille (1)	Périgueux
21:00 CET			Alessandrini 33'; Fletcher 87'	Stadium: Stade Francis Rongieras

== Quarter-finals ==
Matches played on 2 and 3 March 2016.

2 March 2016	Lorient (1)	3–0	Gazélec Ajaccio (1)	Lorient
19:00	Philippoteaux 9'; Barthelme 43'; Paye 90+1'			Stadium: Stade du Moustoir; Referee: Benoît Millot

2 March 2016	Sochaux (2)	3–2 (a.e.t.)	Nantes (1)	Montbéliard
19:00	Sao 87', 106'; Cissé 98'		Audel 5'; Adryan 116'	Stadium: Stade Auguste Bonal; Referee: Tony Chapron

2 March 2016	Saint-Étienne (1)	1–3	Paris Saint-Germain (1)	Saint-Étienne
21:05	Eysseric 42' (pen.)	Report	Cavani 11'; Marquinhos 35'; Lucas 90+2'	Stadium: Stade Geoffroy Guichard; Referee: Benoît Bastien

3 March 2016	Granville (5)	0–1	Marseille (1)	Caen
21:00			Batshuayi 50'	Stadium: Stade Michel d'Ornano; Attendance: 21,000; Referee: Frank Schneider

== Semi-finals ==
Matches played between 19 and 20 April 2016.

19 April 2016	Lorient (1)	0–1	Paris Saint-Germain (1)	Lorient
21:00			Ibrahimović 75'	Stadium: Stade du Moustoir; Referee: Franck Schneider replaced by Sébastien Moreira

20 April 2016	Sochaux (2)	0–1	Marseille (1)	Montbéliard
21:00			Thauvin 49'	Stadium: Stade Auguste Bonal; Referee: Benoît Millot

== Final ==
Match played on 21 May 2016.

21 May 2016
21:00 CEST

Marseille	2–4	Paris Saint-Germain
Thauvin 12'; Batshuayi 87'	Report	Matuidi 2'; Ibrahimović 47' (pen.), 82'; Cavani 57'

Stade de France, Saint-Denis
Attendance: 80,000
Referee: Clement Turpin
