= Dominique Pandor =

Martiniquais footballer (born 1993)

Personal information
- Date of birth: 15 May 1993 (age 33)
- Place of birth: La Trinité, Martinique, France
- Height: 1.70 m (5 ft 7 in)
- Position: Attacking midfielder

Team information
- Current team: Blois
- Number: 32

Youth career
- 2000–2006: La Gauloise de Trinité
- 2006–2008: FC Montfermeil
- 2008–2010: Monaco

Senior career*
Years	Team	Apps	(Gls)
2010–2015	Monaco B	70	(19)
2013–2014	→ Brest (loan)	19	(1)
2013–2014	→ Brest B (loan)	7	(2)
2015–2016	Boulogne	22	(1)
2015–2016	Boulogne B	2	(0)
2016–2017	CA Bastia	34	(6)
2017–2018	Laval	20	(3)
2017–2018	Laval B	5	(2)
2019	Sedan	14	(1)
2019–2020	Gazélec Ajaccio	10	(0)
2020–2022	Les Herbiers	37	(6)
2022–2023	Andrézieux-Bouthéon FC	5	(0)
2023–2024	Granville	16	(1)
2025–	Blois	6	(0)

International career
2010	France U18	2	(0)
2014–2017	Martinique	3	(0)
- * Club domestic league appearances and goals as of 5 December 2025

Dominique Pandor (born 15 May 1993) is a Martiniquais professional footballer who plays as an attacking midfielder for Championnat National 1 club Blois.

== Career ==
In January 2019, Pandor moved to Sedan. He left the club at the end of the season and was without club until 9 December 2019, where he signed with Championnat National club Gazélec Ajaccio on a deal for the rest of the season with an option for one further year. In July 2020, he moved to Championnat National 1 club Les Herbiers.

== Career statistics ==
=== Club ===
As of 20 August 2024

Appearances and goals by club, season and competition
Club	Season	League			Coupe de France		Coupe de la Ligue		Total	
Club	Season	Division	Apps	Goals	Apps	Goals	Apps	Goals	Apps	Goals
Monaco B	2010-11	CFA	2	0	—		—		2	0
Monaco B	2011-12	CFA	27	9	—		—		27	9
Monaco B	2012-13	CFA	32	9	—		—		32	9
Monaco B	2014-15	CFA	9	1	—		—		9	1
Monaco B	Total		70	19	—		—		70	19
Brest (loan)	2013-14	Ligue 2	19	1	2	0	1	0	22	1
Brest B (loan)	2013-14	CFA2	7	2	—		—		7	2
Boulogne	2015-16	Championnat National	22	1	3	1	—		25	2
Boulogne B	2015-16	CFA2	2	0	—		—		2	0
CA Bastia	2016-17	Championnat National	34	6	4	0	—		38	6
Laval	2017-18	Championnat National	20	3	2	1	—		22	4
Laval B	2017-18	Championnat National 3	5	2	—		—		5	2
Sedan	2018-19	Championnat National 2	14	1	—		—		14	1
Gazélec Ajaccio	2019-20	Championnat National	10	0	—		—		10	0
Les Herbiers	2020-21	Championnat National 2	9	0	3	0	—		12	0
Les Herbiers	2021-22	Championnat National 2	28	6	2	0	—		30	6
Les Herbiers	Total		37	6	5	0	—		42	6
Andrézieux	2022-23	Championnat National 2	5	0	1	0	—		6	0
Granville	2023-24	Championnat National 2	16	1	—		—		16	1
Career Total			261	42	17	2	1	0	279	44
