= Vincent Créhin =

French footballer (born 1989)

Personal information
- Date of birth: 21 January 1989 (age 37)
- Place of birth: Quimper, France
- Height: 1.69 m (5 ft 7 in)
- Position: Forward

Team information
- Current team: Avranches
- Number: 7

Youth career
- –2008: Guingamp

Senior career*
Years	Team	Apps	(Gls)
2008–2009	Cannes	14	(1)
2009–2010	Plabennec	38	(9)
2010–2011	Laval	15	(0)
2011–2012	Beauvais	33	(9)
2012–2013	Carquefou	27	(2)
2013–2015	Avranches	60	(29)
2015–2016	Amiens	15	(1)
2016–2020	Le Mans	118	(60)
2020–2021	Nea Salamina	24	(2)
2021–2022	Cholet	22	(3)
2022–2024	Granville	47	(25)
2024	Saint-Malo		
2025	Granville	16	(6)
2025–	Avranches	7	(3)
- * Club domestic league appearances and goals as of 4 December 2025

Vincent Créhin (born 21 January 1989) is a French professional footballer who plays as a striker for Championnat National 1 club Avranches.

== Club career ==
In the 2010–11 season, Créhin made 15 appearances in Ligue 2 for Laval.

Créhin signed for Nea Salamis Famagusta in the summer of 2020, having quit Le Mans after five seasons at the club.

On 4 June 2021, Créhin returned to France and signed with Championnat National club Cholet.

On 20 June 2022, he signed with Granville in Championnat National 2.

== Career statistics ==
As of match played 6 March 2020.

Appearances and goals by club, season and competition
Club	Season	League			Cup		League Cup		Other		Total	
Club	Season	Division	Apps	Goals	Apps	Goals	Apps	Goals	Apps	Goals	Apps	Goals
Cannes	2008–09	National	14	1	3	2	0	0	0	0	17	3
Plabennec	2009–10	National	38	9	7	4	0	0	0	0	45	13
Laval	2010–11	Ligue 2	15	0	2	0	2	0	0	0	19	0
Beauvais	2011–12	National	32	10	2	2	0	0	0	0	34	12
Carquefou	2012–13	National	27	2	3	1	0	0	0	0	30	3
Avranches	2013–14	CFA Group D	28	15	2	0	0	0	0	0	30	15
Avranches	2014–15	National	32	14	5	5	0	0	0	0	36	19
Avranches	Total		60	29	7	5	0	0	0	0	66	34
Amiens	2015–16	National	15	1	3	2	0	0	0	0	18	3
Le Mans	2015–16	CFA 2	13	4	0	0	0	0	0	0	13	4
Le Mans	2016–17	CFA 2	21	19	3	3	0	0	0	0	24	22
Le Mans	2017–18	National 2	29	19	2	1	0	0	0	0	31	20
Le Mans	2018–19	National	30	10	0	0	0	0	2 (Note: Appearance(s) in 2018–19 Championnat National Promotion play-offs.)	0	32	10
Le Mans	2019–20	Ligue 2	25	8	3	1	3	1	0	0	31	10
Le Mans	Total		118	60	7	5	3	1	2	0	130	66
Career total			319	112	34	21	5	1	2	0	360	134
