= 2014–15 Championnat de France Amateur =

Championnat de France amateur
- Season: 2014–15
- Promoted: Sedan; Belfort; Béziers; Les Herbiers
- Relegated: 7 clubs

The 2014–15 Championnat de France amateur was the 17th season since its establishment. CS Sedan Ardennes, ASM Belfort, AS Béziers and Les Herbiers VF were promoted.

== Teams ==
There were twelve teams promoted from Championnat de France amateur 2, while two teams were relegated from the 2013–14 Championnat de France amateur. No teams came from the 2013–14 Championnat National. The original plan was to have US Colomiers, RC Strasbourg, Vannes OC and ES Uzès Pont du Gard also relegated from the Championnat National, but due to DNCG and/or FFF rulings, the following clubs were relegated to lower divisions: Luzenac AP (promotion ineligible), USJA Carquefou (voluntary), Vannes (bankruptcy) and Uzès Pont du Gard (bankruptcy). Colomeirs and Strasbourg stayed in Championnat National.

AS Cannes, which ended at 6th in Group B, was declared bankrupt. They were subsequently demoted to the second highest league of their region (7th level overall). Vesoul HSF was also declared bankrupt, while AS Cherbourg voluntarily restarted in their regional leagues. AS Valence folded and was immediately refounded as Olympique de Valence, also restarting in their respective regional divisions.

Because of these vacancies, JA Drancy, FC Montceau Bourgogne, Jura Sud Foot, Tarbes PF, Stade Montois and Stade Plabennécois remained in the CFA.

== League tables ==
=== Group A ===
Pos	Team	Pld	W	D	L	GF	GA	GD	Pts	Promotion or relegation
1	Sedan (C, P)	30	24	3	3	61	25	+36	105	Promotion to Championnat National
2	Quevilly	30	14	6	10	41	32	+9	78	
3	Paris Saint-Germain Reserves	30	11	10	9	35	36	−1	73	
4	IC Croix	30	12	7	11	37	32	+5	72 (Note: Deducted one point)	
5	Dieppe	30	11	8	11	33	28	+5	71	
6	Calais RUFC	30	10	9	11	26	35	−9	69	
7	AC Amiens	30	10	8	12	34	26	+8	68	
8	Romorantin	30	10	8	12	29	35	−6	68	
9	L'Entente SSG	30	9	10	11	28	29	−1	67	
10	Roye	30	10	7	13	24	29	−5	67	
11	Lens Reserves	30	8	12	10	35	37	−2	66	
12	Mantes	30	10	6	14	31	45	−14	65	
13	Arras FA	30	9	9	12	37	44	−7	65	
14	Lille Reserves (R)	30	8	11	11	33	36	−3	65	Relegation to Championnat de France amateur 2
15	Beauvais (R)	30	6	16	8	26	28	−2	64	Relegation to Championnat de France amateur 2
16	Ivry (R)	30	8	10	12	31	44	−13	64	Relegation to Championnat de France amateur 2

Source: French Football Federation
Rules for classification: 1) points; 2) goal difference; 3) number of goals scored.
(C) Champions; (P) Promoted; (R) Relegated

=== Group B ===
Pos	Team	Pld	W	D	L	GF	GA	GD	Pts	Promotion or relegation
1	Belfort (C, P)	30	17	10	3	51	30	+21	91	Promotion to Championnat National
2	Fleury-Mérogis	30	13	12	5	38	25	+13	80 (Note: Deducted one point after 0-3 technical loss to Montceau.)	
3	Mulhouse	30	14	6	10	45	32	+13	77	
4	Montceau	30	13	6	11	41	38	+3	75	
5	Moulins	30	13	5	12	35	30	+5	74	
6	Sarre-Union	30	12	8	10	47	42	+5	74	
7	Aubervilliers	30	11	10	9	29	35	−6	73	
8	Jura Sud	30	10	10	10	40	42	−2	70	
9	Drancy	30	8	12	10	40	43	−3	66	
10	Troyes Reserves	30	9	8	13	34	43	−9	65	
11	Yzeure	30	7	13	10	24	29	−5	64	
12	Viry	30	6	16	8	24	32	−8	64	
13	Sochaux Reserves	30	8	9	13	48	43	+5	63	
14	Raon (R)	30	8	8	14	37	44	−7	62	Relegation to Championnat de France amateur 2
15	Metz Reserves (R)	30	8	8	14	29	38	−9	62	Relegation to Championnat de France amateur 2
16	Saint-Étienne Reserves (R)	30	7	10	13	33	42	−9	61	Relegation to Championnat de France amateur 2

Source: French Football Federation
Rules for classification: 1) points; 2) goal difference; 3) number of goals scored.
(C) Champions; (P) Promoted; (R) Relegated

=== Group C ===
Pos	Team	Pld	W	D	L	GF	GA	GD	Pts	Promotion or relegation
1	Béziers (C, P)	30	19	3	8	45	24	+21	90	Promotion to Championnat National
2	Grenoble	30	17	8	5	43	19	+24	89	
3	Lyon Reserves	30	14	10	6	44	28	+16	82	
4	Martigues	30	13	9	8	39	30	+9	78	
5	Marignane	30	11	12	7	35	25	+10	75	
6	Villefranche	30	9	13	8	30	40	−10	70	
7	Rodez	30	11	7	12	40	49	−9	70	
8	Sète	30	9	12	9	29	34	−5	69	
9	Monaco Reserves	30	8	12	10	41	35	+6	66	
10	Nice Reserves	30	9	10	11	39	46	−7	66	
11	Monts d'Or	30	9	7	14	27	40	−13	64	
12	Lyon-Duchère	30	7	12	11	35	35	0	63	
13	Le Pontet	30	7	12	11	36	40	−4	62 (Note: Deducted one point for improper registration.)	
14	Hyères	30	7	11	12	26	33	−7	62	Saved from relegation
15	Montpellier Reserves (R)	30	6	9	15	31	46	−15	57	Relegation to Championnat France de amateur 2
16	Saint-Priest (R)	30	5	11	14	25	41	−16	56	Relegation to Championnat France de amateur 2

Source: French Football Federation
Rules for classification: 1) points; 2) goal difference; 3) number of goals scored.
(C) Champions; (P) Promoted; (R) Relegated

=== Group D ===
Pos	Team	Pld	W	D	L	GF	GA	GD	Pts	Promotion or relegation
1	Lorient Reserves (C)	30	15	11	4	44	29	+15	86	
2	Les Herbiers (P)	30	17	5	8	50	26	+24	86	Promotion to Championnat National
3	Stade Bordelais	30	15	7	8	39	32	+7	82	
4	Concarneau	30	13	10	7	46	32	+14	79	
5	Trélissac	30	14	7	9	46	34	+12	79	
6	Pau	30	11	12	7	49	36	+13	75	
7	Vitré	30	13	6	11	45	48	−3	75	
8	Nantes Reserves	30	11	9	10	42	42	0	72	
9	Stade Montois	30	10	7	13	43	40	+3	67	
10	Bordeaux Reserves	30	10	7	13	47	48	−1	67	
11	Stade Plabennécois	30	9	8	13	29	41	−12	65	
12	Tarbes	30	8	10	12	32	40	−8	64	
13	Saint-Malo	30	8	10	12	39	46	−7	64	
14	Vendée Fontenay	30	7	12	11	33	40	−7	63	Saved from relegation
15	Pontivy (R)	30	5	10	15	23	40	−17	55	Relegation to Championnat de France amateur 2
16	Limoges (R)	30	4	9	17	33	57	−24	50	Relegation to Championnat de France amateur 2

Source: French Football Federation
Rules for classification: 1) points; 2) goal difference; 3) number of goals scored.
(C) Champions; (P) Promoted; (R) Relegated
