= Tommy Untereiner =

French footballer (born 1989)

Personal information
- Date of birth: 30 June 1989 (age 37)
- Place of birth: Alès, France
- Height: 1.83 m (6 ft 0 in)
- Position: Attacking midfielder

Team information
- Current team: Granville

Senior career*
| Years | Team | Apps | (Gls) |
| 2006–2007 | Uzès | ? | (?) |
| 2007–2012 | Istres | 24 | (1) |
| 2011–2012 | → Bayonne (loan) | 11 | (1) |
| 2012–2013 | Martigues | 17 | (0) |
| 2013– | Granville | 39 | (10) |
- * Club domestic league appearances and goals as of 6 March 2016

Tommy Untereiner (born 30 June 1989) is a French professional footballer who plays as an attacking midfielder for Granville.

He has represented Istres in the French Ligue 2, the second tier of professional football. He has also represented Bayonne and Martigues at lower levels of football in France.

== 2015–16 Coupe de France ==
Untereiner rose to some notoriety when, on 9 February 2016, he scored the winning goal in extra time for his club Granville as the CFA 2 side beat Ligue 2 side Bourg-en-Bresse to progress to the Quarterfinals of the 2015–16 Coupe de France. The match was televised live, and this led to the video clip of the goal being widely published on the internet.
