= Sébastien Chéré =

French footballer (born 1986)

Personal information
- Full name: Sébastien Chéré
- Date of birth: 23 December 1986 (age 39)
- Place of birth: Épinal, France
- Height: 1.72 m (5 ft 8 in)
- Position: Midfielder

Team information
- Current team: Colmar

Senior career*
Years	Team	Apps	(Gls)
2010–2013	Épinal	103	(14)
2013–2016	Colmar	87	(7)
2016–2019	Bourg-en-Bresse	54	(2)
2018	Bourg-en-Bresse B	2	(0)
2019–2020	Avranches	9	(0)
2020	Avranches B	3	(0)
2020–2025	Épinal	117	(1)
2025–	Colmar	0	(0)
- * Club domestic league appearances and goals as of 06:51, 1 August 2025 (UTC)

Sébastien Chéré (born 23 December 1986) is a French professional footballer who plays as midfielder for Championnat National 1 club Colmar.

Previously, he played in Ligue 2 for Bourg-en-Bresse. Chéré was captain at Colmar prior to his transfer to Bourg-en-Bresse.

== Career statistics ==
As of match played 28 May 2022

Appearances and goals by club, season and competition
Club	Season	League			National Cup		League Cup		Other		Total	
Club	Season	Division	Apps	Goals	Apps	Goals	Apps	Goals	Apps	Goals	Apps	Goals
Épinal	2010–11	CFA	31	9	0	0	—		—		31	9
Épinal	2011–12	National	36	2	0	0	—		—		36	2
Épinal	2012–13	National	36	3	4	1	—		—		40	4
Épinal	Total		103	14	4	1	—		—		107	15
Colmar	2013–14	National	33	4	0	0	—		—		33	4
Colmar	2014–15	National	32	3	0	0	—		—		32	3
Colmar	2015–16	National	22	0	1	0	—		—		23	0
Colmar	Total		87	7	1	0	—		—		88	7
Bourg-en-Bresse	2016–17	Ligue 2	15	0	0	0	0	0	—		15	0
Bourg-en-Bresse	2017–18	Ligue 2	10	0	0	0	1	0	1 (Note: Appearance in the Ligue 2 Relegation play-offs)	0	12	0
Bourg-en-Bresse	2018–19	National	29	2	0	0	1	0	—		30	2
Bourg-en-Bresse	Total		54	2	0	0	2	0	1	0	57	2
Bourg-en-Bresse B	2017–18	National 3	2	0	—		—		—		2	0
Avranches	2019–20	National	9	0	0	0	—		—		9	0
Avranches B	2019–20	National 3	3	0	—		—		—		3	0
Épinal	2020–21	National 2	6	0	1	0	—		—		7	0
Épinal	2021–22	National 2	28	1	0	0	—		—		28	1
Épinal	Total		34	1	1	0	—		—		35	1
Career total			292	24	6	1	2	0	1	0	301	25
