= Gustave Akueson =

Footballer (born 1995)

Personal information
- Date of birth: 20 December 1995 (age 30)
- Place of birth: Ermont, France
- Height: 1.90 m (6 ft 3 in)
- Position: Defender

Team information
- Current team: Bastia
- Number: 28

Senior career*
Years	Team	Apps	(Gls)
2014–2016	Saint-Ouen-l'Aumône	37	(2)
2016–2017	Le Havre B	17	(1)
2017–2018	Chambly B	15	(2)
2018	Chambly	1	(0)
2018–2019	Drancy	12	(0)
2019–2021	Granville	27	(3)
2021–2024	Versailles	79	(4)
2024–	Bastia	43	(0)

International career^{‡}
2021–	Togo	5	(0)
- * Club domestic league appearances and goals as of 12 May 2026 ‡ National team caps and goals as of 10 October 2024

Gustave Akueson (born 20 December 1995) is a professional footballer who plays as a defender for Ligue 3 club Bastia. Born in France, he plays for the Togo national team.

== Club career ==
On 10 June 2024, it was announced that Akueson had signed for Ligue 2 club Bastia on a two-year contract with an additional optional year.

== International career ==
Akueson received first call-up to the Togo national team in May 2021. He made his international debut on 9 October 2021 in a 1–1 World Cup qualifier draw against Congo.

== Career statistics ==
=== International ===
As of 10 October 2024

Appearances and goals by national team and year
National team	Year	Apps	Goals
Togo	2021	2	0
Togo	2024	3	0
Total		5	0

== Honours ==
Versailles

- Championnat National 2: 2021–22
