= Kama Massampu =

French footballer (born 1991)

Francis Massampu
Personal information
- Full name: Francis Kama Massampu
- Date of birth: 26 December 1991 (age 34)
- Place of birth: Mantes-la-Jolie, France
- Position: Forward

Team information
- Current team: FC Mantes

Youth career
- 2007–2009: Boulogne

Senior career*
Years	Team	Apps	(Gls)
2009–2010	FC Mantes	13	(2)
2010–2014	Valenciennes II	19	(6)
2010–2014	Valenciennes FC	8	(0)
2011–2012	→ Aviron Bayonnais (loan)	13	(1)
2015	Deportivo B	9	(0)
2015–	FC Mantes	3	(0)
- * Club domestic league appearances and goals as of 17 October 2015

Francis Kama Massampu (born 26 December 1991) is a French professional footballer who plays for FC Mantes as a forward.

== Club career ==
He began his career with US Boulogne playing on the club's under-17 team. In 2009, Massampu joined Championnat de France amateur club FC Mantes initially playing on the club's under-19 team. On 9 August 2009, he made his debut for the club in a league match against the reserve team of Auxerre. Massampu finished the campaign with 13 appearances and two goals. In May 2010, he signed with professional club Valenciennes FC and spent the first two months of his career at the club on the club's its reserve team. On 21 September 2010, Massampu made his professional debut in a Coupe de la Ligue match against Nîmes Olympique appearing as a substitute. Valenciennes won the match 5–4 on penalties.

He trained with the reserves of Deportivo de La Coruña, waiting for the opening of the winter transfer window to sign for them.
