= Thibaut Cillard =

French footballer (born 1995)

Personal information
- Date of birth: 23 December 1995 (age 30)
- Place of birth: Tours, France
- Height: 1.86 m (6 ft 1 in)
- Position: Centre back

Team information
- Current team: Saint-Malo
- Number: 23

Youth career
- Tours

Senior career*
Years	Team	Apps	(Gls)
2013–2018	Tours B	24	(1)
2014–2018	Tours	64	(4)
2017–2018	→ Avranches (loan)	13	(1)
2017–2018	→ Avranches B (loan)	1	(0)
2019–2021	Saint-Malo	24	(2)
2021–2022	Saint-Quentin	24	(0)
2022–	Saint-Malo	81	(5)
- * Club domestic league appearances and goals as of 4 December 2025

Thibaut Cillard (born 23 December 1995) is a French professional footballer who plays as a defender for Championnat National 1 club Saint-Malo.

== Career ==
Cillard was released from his contract by Tours in November 2018.

In 2022, one year after leaving the club, Cillard made his return to Saint-Malo.
