= Sulaiman Sesay-Fullah =

Sierra Leonean footballer (born 1991)

Personal information
- Date of birth: 16 September 1991 (age 35)
- Place of birth: Freetown, Sierra Leone
- Height: 1.74 m (5 ft 9 in)
- Position: Forward

Youth career
- 2006–2007: Accademia Internazionale
- 2007–2010: Inter Milan

Senior career*
Years	Team	Apps	(Gls)
2007–2010	Inter Milan	0	(0)
2009–2010	→ Eupen (loan)		
2010–2012	Parma	0	(0)
2011–2012	→ FC Brussels (loan)	1	(0)
2013	Etar 1924	3	(0)
2016–2017	SpVgg Sterkrade-Nord	11	(3)
2018	SC 1920 Oberhausen		
2018–2019	FC Roj Dortmund		
2019–2022	FC Roj Dortmund II		
Total		15	(3)

International career
2011–2014	Sierra Leone	2	(1)
- * Club domestic league appearances and goals

Sulaiman Sesay-Fullah (born 16 September 1991) is a Sierra Leonean former professional footballer who plays as a forward.

== Club career ==
Born in Freetown, the capital of Sierra Leone, Sesay-Fullah played for Italian club Accademia Internazionale in 2006–07 season. The club was part of Inter Milan academy as an affiliated club. The two Allievi team of the club finished as the losing quarter-finalists of Lombardy regional Allievi League, and eliminated in round of 16 of Allievi Fascia B respectively. After the tournament, he was selected to Lombardy region Allievi representative team for 2007 Coppa Nazionale Primavera, a youth tournament for the representative teams of Italian regions. Lombardy did not qualify from the group stage.

Sesay-Fullah joined Internazionale's Allievi Nazionali team in 2007–08 season, from the affiliated club, which he won the league champion. He scored 17 goals in the group stage that season, along with Luca Tremolada as the topscorer of that stage. In the next season he was promoted to Inter's senior youth team Primavera, but failed to play regularly nor scoring. He also played once for the first team in club friendlies. In 2009–10 season he left for Eupen along with Nicolas Desenclos. In January 2010 he was signed by fellow Serie A club Parma. He failed to play for both reserve and the first team due to non-EU policy.

On 26 August 2011, Sesay-Fullah joined Belgian second division club FC Brussels on loan from Parma.

== International career ==
In September 2010, he was called to Sierra Leone national football team for a 2012 Africa Cup of Nations qualification match. He made a substitute appearance on that match, which 0–0 draw with South Africa on 10 October. He also received a call-up for national under-23 team in 2012 CAF Men's Pre-Olympic Tournament qualifying rounds.

=== International goal ===
As of 31 May 2014

- Source: National-Football-Teams.com

#	Date	Venue	Opponent	Score	Result	Competition
1	18 May 2014	Somhlolo National Stadium, Lobamba, Swaziland	Swaziland	0–1	1–1	2015 Africa Cup of Nations qualifier
