= Sarreguemines FC =

French football club

Sarreguemines
- Full name: Sarreguemines Football Club
- Founded: 1919
- Ground: Stade de la Blies
- Chairman: Christophe Marie
- Manager: Salem El Foukhari
- League: Régional 1 Lorraine
- 2019–20: National 3 Group F, 14th (relegated)

Sarreguimines Football Club is a French football club from Sarreguemines, Moselle, Lorraine. Founded in 1919 and formerly known as Association sarreguiminois de football 93, it plays in the Regional 1, Lorraine, the sixth level of the French football league system, following relegation in 2020.

== History ==
The team reached the last 32 of the 2015–16 Coupe de France, defeating SC Schiltigheim, and Dijon FCO and Valenciennes FC of Ligue 2, before losing to fellow fifth-tier team US Granville.

== Current squad ==
As of 27 February 2019

Note: Flags indicate national team as defined under FIFA eligibility rules; some limited exceptions apply. Players may hold more than one non-FIFA nationality.

| No. | Pos. | Nation | Player |
|---|---|---|---|
| — | GK | FRA | Guillaume Cappa |
| — | GK | FRA | Fabien Monthe |
| — | DF | FRA | Khalid Benichou |
| — | DF | NGA | Oluwole Adebayo |
| — | DF | FRA | Mohamed Assou |
| — | DF | FRA | Alan Wengert |
| — | DF | FRA | Florian Hesse |
| — | DF | FRA | Caner Metin |
| — | DF | FRA | Nicolas Schwartz |
| — | MF | FRA | Jordan Coignard |
| — | MF | FRA | Benoît Kowalczyk |
| — | MF | FRA | Yannick Dekoun |
| — | MF | FRA | Mafoud El Hellaoui |

| No. | Pos. | Nation | Player |
|---|---|---|---|
| — | MF | ALG | Yassine Mohammed |
| — | MF | FRA | Mehdi Ouadah |
| — | MF | FRA | Jordan Steiner |
| — | MF | FRA | Ludovic Guerriero |
| — | FW | MAR | Elhassane M'Barki |
| — | FW | FRA | Jean-Baptiste Steininger |
| — | FW | FRA | Paul Lévy |
| — | FW | FRA | Sahel Redjam |
| — | FW | FRA | Ibrahim Baradji |
| — | FW | FRA | Diego Fournier |
| — | FW | MLI | Seydou Simpara |
| — | FW | FRA | Smail Morabit |
