= Pierre Magnon =

French footballer (born 1996)

Personal information
- Date of birth: 9 May 1996 (age 30)
- Place of birth: Saint-Malo, France
- Height: 1.79 m (5 ft 10 in)
- Position: Midfielder

Team information
- Current team: Saint-Malo
- Number: 6

Youth career
- 2010–2012: Bréquigny
- 2012–2013: Brest

Senior career*
Years	Team	Apps	(Gls)
2013–2019	Brest B	110	(11)
2018–2019	Brest	6	(0)
2019–2020	Avranches B	4	(0)
2019–2024	Avranches	125	(5)
2024–	Saint-Malo	34	(4)
- * Club domestic league appearances and goals as of 4 December 2025

Pierre Magnon (born 9 May 1996) is a French professional footballer who plays as a midfielder for Championnat National 1 club Saint-Malo.

== Club career ==
Magnon's father died when Pierre was 12, he joined the Bréquigny boarding school and football team at age 14, and he joined Brest at the age of 17. He signed his first professional contract in June 2016. Magnon made his professional debut for Brest in a Ligue 2 1–1 tie with US Orléans on 30 March 2018.

Magnon joined US Avranches in the summer of 2019.
