= Tom Duponchelle =

French professional footballer (born 1996)

Personal information
- Date of birth: 17 January 1996 (age 30)
- Place of birth: Amiens, France
- Height: 1.75 m (5 ft 9 in)
- Position: Defender

Team information
- Current team: Saint-Malo
- Number: 12

Senior career*
Years	Team	Apps	(Gls)
2013–2015	Amiens II	11	(0)
2014–2017	Reims II	48	(1)
2017–2020	Le Mans	56	(0)
2018–2020	Le Mans II	5	(0)
2020–2021	Laval	21	(1)
2021–2022	Hyères	23	(1)
2022–2023	Le Puy	21	(0)
2024	Alès	10	(0)
2024–	Saint-Malo	38	(1)
- * Club domestic league appearances and goals as of 4 December 2025

Tom Duponchelle (born 17 February 1996) is a French professional footballer who plays as a defender for Championnat National 1 club Saint-Malo.

== Career ==
Duponchelle made his professional debut with Le Mans in a 2–1 Ligue 2 loss to Lens on 27 July 2019.

On 12 June 2022, Duponchelle signed a pre-contract agreement with Championnat National side Le Puy.
