= Jason Buaillon =

French footballer (born 1991)

Personal information
- Full name: Jason Jean Luc Buaillon
- Date of birth: 5 October 1991 (age 35)
- Place of birth: Le Mans, France
- Height: 1.70 m (5 ft 7 in)
- Positions: Left back; midfielder

Team information
- Current team: Gazélec Ajaccio

Youth career
- Le Mans

Senior career*
Years	Team	Apps	(Gls)
2009–2014	Le Mans II	51	(3)
2011–2014	Le Mans	41	(1)
2014	Sion	3	(0)
2014–2015	Standard Liège	0	(0)
2014–2015	→ Paris FC II (loan)	3	(1)
2015–2016	Luçon	20	(0)
2016–2021	Créteil	94	(5)
2016–2020	Créteil II	6	(1)
2021–2022	Louhans-Cuiseaux	29	(1)
2022–2026	La Roche VF	97	(2)
2026–	Gazélec Ajaccio	0	(0)
- * Club domestic league appearances and goals as of 16 May 2026

Jason Jean Luc Buaillon (born 5 October 1991) is a French footballer who plays for Championnat National 2 club Gazélec Ajaccio as a left back or defensive midfielder.

== Club career ==
Born in Le Mans, Buaillon graduated from Le Mans FC's youth system, and made his professional debut on 29 July 2011, starting in a 0–1 loss at AC Arles Avignon for the Ligue 2 championship. He scored his first goal on 6 April of the following year, netting his side's second of a 3–1 win at RC Lens.

On 21 November 2013 Buaillon agreed a move to FC Sion, being effective in January of the following year. He appeared in only three matches for the Swiss side (169 minutes of action), which finished eighth.

On 30 June 2014 Buaillon signed a three-year deal with Standard Liège, being subsequently loaned to AD Alcorcón. However, after being deemed surplus to requirements by manager José Bordalás, he moved to Paris FC also in a temporary deal.

In June 2015 Buaillon signed for Vendée Luçon Football. However, the club filed for bankruptcy at the end of the 2015–16 season, and he was released, before signing for Créteil.
