= Nakibou Aboubakari =

Footballer (born 1993)

Personal information
- Date of birth: 10 March 1993 (age 33)
- Place of birth: Saint Denis, France
- Height: 1.78 m (5 ft 10 in)
- Position: Midfielder

Team information
- Current team: CO Briochin SP

Youth career
- 2009–2011: Guingamp B

Senior career*
Years	Team	Apps	(Gls)
2011–2013	Guingamp B	22	(5)
2013–2014	Olympiakos Nicosia	27	(3)
2014–2017	Stade Briochin	66	(7)
2017–2018	Guingamp B	20	(3)
2018–2021	Stade Briochin	68	(5)
2021–2022	Sète	10	(0)
2022–2023	Fleury	15	(0)
2023–2024	US Langueux		
2024–	CO Briochin SP		

International career
2011–2021	Comoros	8	(0)
- * Club domestic league appearances and goals as of 07:24, 30 December 2025 (UTC)

Nakibou Aboubakari (born 10 March 1993) is a professional footballer who plays as a midfielder for Régional 2 club CO Briochin SP. Born in France, he played for the Comoros national team.

== Club career ==
Aboubakari was born in Saint Denis, France. He started his career with Guingamp but was released in 2013, having made one appearance for the first team in Ligue 2. He signed for Cypriot Second Division side Olympiakos Nicosia for the 2013–14 season.

In August 2014, he had an unsuccessful trial at Cypriot First Division side Apollon Limassol. On 17 October 2014, he signed for Stade Briochin.

After three seasons with Stade Briochin, he was tempted back to Guingamp, signing to play with the B team in Championnat National 3, but with the hope of returning to the professional group. The opportunity did not arise, and in June 2018 he returned to Stade Briochin.

Before the 2021–22 season, he moved to Sète. On 10 January 2022, he signed for Fleury in the Championnat National 2.

== International career ==
Aboubakari made his debut for Comoros on 11 November 2011, coming on as a second-half substitute in the 2014 FIFA World Cup qualification – CAF first round first leg against Mozambique.
