= Thomas Vauvy =

French footballer (born 1985)

Thomas Vauvy (born 11 September 1985) is a French footballer who played as a striker.

== Early life ==
Vauvy was born and raised in Coutances, France.

== Club career ==
Vauvy has been described as the "enfant terrible of Manchois football". Vauvy started his career with French side FC Saint-Lô Manche. In 2007, Vauvy signed for French side Stade Lavallois, helping the club achieve promotion. He received a nine-month suspension after harming a Cannes player. In 2010, he signed for French side AS Cherbourg Football. In 2016, he returned to French side FC Saint-Lô Manche, where he captained the club. In 2022, he signed for French side FC Agon-Coutainville. He was regarded as one of the club's most important players. He then suffered an injury.

== International career ==
Vauvy played for the Normandy football team at the UEFA Regions Cup.

== Post-playing career ==
After retiring from professional football, Vauvy worked as a communications officer.

== Managerial career ==
After retiring from professional football, Vauvy worked as a youth manager.

== Personal life ==
Vauvy has a daughter.
