= Alexandre N'Gadi =

French footballer (born 1990)

Personal information
- Full name: Alexandre N'Gadi Kakou
- Date of birth: 28 November 1990 (age 35)
- Place of birth: L'Union, France
- Height: 1.75 m (5 ft 9 in)
- Position: Midfielder

Senior career*
Years	Team	Apps	(Gls)
2009–2010	Toulouse	1	(0)
2010–2011	Balma	18	(3)
2011–2012	Tarbes	25	(5)
2012–2013	Pau	31	(2)
2014–2015	ASPCR		
2015–2020	Genêts Anglet	125	(19)
2020–2021	Bayonne	8	(0)
2022–2023	Hiriburuko Ainhara		
- * Club domestic league appearances and goals as of 07:31, 9 March 2022 (UTC)

Alexandre N'Gadi Kakou (born 28 November 1990) is a French professional footballer who plays as a midfielder.

== Career ==
N'Gadi began his career at Toulouse, where he made two senior appearances; one in Ligue 1 and one in the Europa League. Since leaving Toulouse in 2010, he has spent his career in the lower reaches of the French leagues, representing among others Balma, Tarbes and Pau.

== Career statistics ==
As of match played 18 December 2021.

Appearances and goals by club, season and competition
Club	Season	League			National Cup (Note: Includes the Coupe de France)		Other		Total	
Club	Season	Division	Apps	Goals	Apps	Goals	Apps	Goals	Apps	Goals
Toulouse	2009–10	Ligue 1	1	0	0	0	1 (Note: Appearance in the UEFA Europa League)	0	2	0
Balma	2010–11	CFA 2	18	3	0	0	—		18	3
Tarbes	2011–12	CFA	26	5	2	0	—		28	2
Pau	2012–13	CFA	31	2	4	0	—		35	2
Genêts Anglet	2014–15	CFA 2	13	2	0	0	—		13	2
Genêts Anglet	2015–16	CFA 2	26	3	1	1	—		27	4
Genêts Anglet	2016–17	CFA 2	26	2	1	0	—		27	2
Genêts Anglet	2017–18	National 3	26	7	0	0	—		26	7
Genêts Anglet	2018–19	National 3	22	3	1	1	—		11	2
Genêts Anglet	2019–20	National 3	12	2	0	0	—		12	2
Genêts Anglet	Total		101	17	3	2	—		104	17
Bayonne	2020–21	National 3	2	0	2	0	—		4	0
Bayonne	2021–22	National 3	6	0	0	0	—		6	0
Bayonne	Total		8	0	2	0	—		10	0
Career total			209	29	11	2	1	0	221	31
