= Wilfried Louisy-Daniel =

French footballer (born 1986)

Personal information
- Full name: Wilfried Louisy-Daniel
- Date of birth: 29 May 1986 (age 40)
- Place of birth: Versailles, France
- Height: 1.87 m (6 ft 2 in)
- Position: Striker

Team information
- Current team: Racing Colombes

Youth career
- 1994–1999: Fontenay-le-Fleury
- 1999–2002: Versailles
- 2002–2005: Brétigny Foot
- 2006–2008: L'Entente SSG

Senior career*
Years	Team	Apps	(Gls)
2005–2006	DJK TuS Hordel	20	(10)
2008–2009	UJA Alfortville	22	(6)
2009–2010	Poissy	28	(23)
2010–2012	Beauvais	67	(15)
2012–2013	Colmar	37	(9)
2013–2015	Orléans	62	(16)
2015–2016	Chambly	32	(15)
2016–2018	Bourg-en-Bresse	0	(0)
2018–2019	Fleury 91	3	(0)
2019–	Racing Colombes	2	(0)
- * Club domestic league appearances and goals as of 15:11, 11 July 2019 (UTC)

Wilfried Louisy-Daniel (born 29 May 1986) is a French footballer who plays for French club Racing Colombes. Louisy-Daniel is of Martiniquais descent.

== Career ==
Louisy-Daniel was born in Versailles. In the 2005–06 season, Louisy-Daniel migrated to Germany after successfully trialing with Oberliga club DJK TuS Hordel. He spent one season at the club before returning to France. Following a prolific season with AS Poissy in the Championnat de France amateur 2, the fifth level of French football, scoring 23 goals in 28 appearances, he signed with Beauvais.

In June 2019, he joined Racing Club de France Football.

== Career statistics ==
As of 30 October 2015.

Club	Division	Season	League		Cup		League Cup		Total	
Club	Division	Season	Apps	Goals	Apps	Goals	Apps	Goals	Apps	Goals
Alfortville	CFA Group D	2008–09	21	6	3	0	0	0	24	6
Poissy	CFA2 Group A	2009–10	28	23	3	1	0	0	31	24
Beauvais	National	2010–11	32	11	1	0	0	0	33	11
Beauvais	National	2011–12	35	4	2	2	0	0	37	6
Colmar	National	2012–13	37	9	3	2	0	0	40	11
Orléans	National	2013–14	33	14	0	0	0	0	33	14
Orléans	Ligue 2	2014–15	29	2	3	2	1	0	33	4
Chambly	National	2015–16	15	9	1	0	0	0	11	3
Career totals			225	72	16	7	1	0	242	79
