= Jean-Landry Bassilekin =

Cameroonian footballer

Personal information
- Full name: Jean-Landry Bassilekin
- Date of birth: 23 January 1992 (age 34)
- Place of birth: Makénéné, Cameroon
- Height: 1.70 m (5 ft 7 in)
- Position: Striker

Team information
- Current team: US Raon-l'Étape

Senior career*
Years	Team	Apps	(Gls)
2012–2014	Nancy B	31	(10)
2012–2015	Nancy	3	(0)
2015–	US Raon-l'Étape	50	(21)
- * Club domestic league appearances and goals as of 16:49, 14 February 2018 (UTC)

Jean-Landry Bassilekin (born 23 January 1992) is a Cameroonian footballer who currently plays as a striker for US Raon-l'Étape.

== Club career ==
Bassilekin joined AS Nancy on 3 September 2009 signing a three-year contract. He made his debut for the Ligue 1 club on 17 February 2013 against Montpellier coming as an 82nd-minute substitute for Lossémy Karaboué.
