= Stade Jean-Antoine Moueix =

Multi-use stadium in Libourne, France

- La banquise
- Interactive map of Stade Jean-Antoine Moueix
- Location: Libourne, France
- Coordinates: 44°54′26″N 0°14′03″W
- Capacity: 8,500
- Surface: grass

Construction
- Opened: 1965
- Renovated: 2007

Tenant
- FC Libourne-Saint-Seurin

Stade Jean-Antoine Moueix is a multi-use stadium in Libourne, France. It is currently used mostly for football matches and is the home stadium of FC Libourne-Saint-Seurin. The stadium is able to hold 8,500 people.
