= 2021–22 Championnat National 2 =

Championnat National 2
- Season: 2021–22
- Dates: 7 August 2021 – 28 May 2022
- Champions: Paris 13 Atletico
- Promoted: Versailles; Martigues; Paris 13 Atletico; Le Puy
- Relegated: 12 teams See Season outcomes
- Top goalscorer: 23 (Anthony Petrilli, Fleury)
- Biggest home win: Épinal 8–1 Reims (res) (Group B, game week 15, 29 January 2022)
- Biggest away win: Plabennec 0–6 Saint-Malo (Group A, game week 29, 21 May 2022)
- Highest scoring: 9 goals Épinal 8–1 Reims (res) (Group B, game week 15, 29 January 2022); Blois 5–4 Vitré (Group A, game week 29, 21 May 2022)
- All statistics correct as of 10:42, 30 May 2022 (UTC).

The 2021–22 Championnat National 2 was the 24th season of the fourth tier in the French football league system. This season the competition was contested by 64 clubs split geographically across four groups of 16 teams. The teams include amateur clubs (although a few are semi-professional) and the reserve teams of professional clubs.

== Teams ==
On 15 July 2021, the FFF ratified the constitution of the competition, and published the groups.

Due to the non-completion of the 2020–21 season, the FFF declared that there would be no regular promotion or relegation from the division, and that any vacancies to be filled would be done on the basis of finishing positions in the 2019–20 season.

Changes from 2020–21 season are as follows:

- Sedan were promoted to Championnat National to replace SC Lyon, who finished bottom of 2020–21 Championnat National, and were relegated according to the rules of that competition. SC Lyon will play as Lyon La Duchère in Championnat National 2 this season.
- Bourges 18 and Bourges Foot merged to form Bourges Foot 18, resulting in a vacancy.
- Gazélec Ajaccio were administratively relegated to Championnat National 3 for financial reasons, a decision which was confirmed on appeal, resulting in a vacancy.
- Vacancies were to be filled by Lille (res) and Vitré as best 14th placed teams in the 2019–20 season. However, Lille (res) declined to take up the position, and were replaced by Montpellier (res).

== Impact of COVID-19 on the season ==
The start of the season was impacted by postponements due to the COVID-19 pandemic in France. Three opening day games in Group C were postponed due to COVID-19 cases at Saint-Priest, Martigues and Aubagne.

The game-week three game between Nantes (res) and Angers (res) was postponed on the preceding Wednesday due to COVID-19 cases at Angers.

== League tables ==
=== Group A ===
| Pos | Team | Pld | W | D | L | GF | GA | GD | Pts | Promotion or relegation |
|---|---|---|---|---|---|---|---|---|---|---|
| 1 | Versailles (C, P) | 30 | 18 | 10 | 2 | 47 | 16 | +31 | 64 | Promotion to National |
| 2 | Lorient (res) | 30 | 16 | 8 | 6 | 49 | 22 | +27 | 56 | |
| 3 | Chartres | 30 | 15 | 5 | 10 | 53 | 49 | +4 | 50 | |
| 4 | Rouen | 30 | 12 | 11 | 7 | 38 | 28 | +10 | 47 | |
| 5 | Blois | 30 | 12 | 7 | 11 | 52 | 56 | −4 | 43 | |
| 6 | Saint-Pryvé | 30 | 12 | 6 | 12 | 37 | 38 | −1 | 42 | |
| 7 | Vannes | 30 | 10 | 9 | 11 | 42 | 43 | −1 | 39 | |
| 8 | Guingamp (res) | 30 | 10 | 8 | 12 | 41 | 48 | −7 | 38 (Note: Guingamp (res) 2–3 Châteaubriant, Guingamp (res) 1–0 Granville, Châteaubriant 0–2 Guingamp (res), Châteaubriant 1–1 Granville, Granville 3–4 Guingamp (res), Granville 0–0 Châteaubriant. Guingamp (res) 9 points, Châteaubriant 5 points, Granville 2 points.) | |
| 9 | Châteaubriant | 30 | 10 | 8 | 12 | 29 | 33 | −4 | 38 (Note: SM Caen (res) 0–0 Romorantin, Romorantin 0–1 SM Caen (res). SM Caen (res) 4 points, Romorantin 1 point.) | |
| 10 | Granville | 30 | 8 | 14 | 8 | 38 | 32 | +6 | 38 | |
| 11 | Saint-Malo | 30 | 10 | 6 | 14 | 33 | 38 | −5 | 36 | |
| 12 | Poissy | 30 | 7 | 15 | 8 | 33 | 40 | −7 | 36 | |
| 13 | SM Caen (res) | 30 | 9 | 8 | 13 | 29 | 41 | −12 | 35 | |
| 14 | Romorantin | 30 | 9 | 8 | 13 | 37 | 40 | −3 | 35 | |
| 15 | Plabennec (R) | 30 | 6 | 9 | 15 | 29 | 45 | −16 | 27 | Relegation to National 3 |
| 16 | Vitré (R) | 30 | 5 | 10 | 15 | 35 | 53 | −18 | 25 | Relegation to National 3 |

Source: soccerway
Rules for classification: 1) points; 2) head-to-head results; 3) head-to-head goal difference; 4) goal difference; 5) number of goals scored; 6) fair play points; 7) draw
(C) Champions; (P) Promoted; (R) Relegated

=== Group B ===
| Pos | Team | Pld | W | D | L | GF | GA | GD | Pts | Promotion or relegation |
|---|---|---|---|---|---|---|---|---|---|---|
| 1 | Paris 13 Atletico (C, P) | 30 | 20 | 6 | 4 | 40 | 17 | +23 | 66 | Promotion to National |
| 2 | Fleury | 30 | 20 | 5 | 5 | 54 | 23 | +31 | 65 | |
| 3 | Beauvais | 30 | 16 | 6 | 8 | 30 | 26 | +4 | 54 | |
| 4 | FC 93 | 30 | 12 | 12 | 6 | 42 | 38 | +4 | 48 | |
| 5 | Épinal | 30 | 13 | 8 | 9 | 49 | 31 | +18 | 47 (Note: Épinal 0–0 Saint-Maur, Saint-Maur 2–2 Épinal. Épinal 1 point +0 goal difference, Saint-Maur 1 point +0 goal difference. Overall goal difference applies.) | |
| 6 | Saint-Maur | 30 | 11 | 14 | 5 | 32 | 22 | +10 | 47 | |
| 7 | Auxerre (res) | 30 | 12 | 6 | 12 | 33 | 35 | −2 | 42 | |
| 8 | Reims (res) | 30 | 10 | 7 | 13 | 42 | 43 | −1 | 37 | |
| 9 | Saint-Quentin | 30 | 8 | 12 | 10 | 36 | 39 | −3 | 36 | |
| 10 | Sainte-Geneviève | 30 | 8 | 11 | 11 | 30 | 34 | −4 | 35 | |
| 11 | Haguenau | 30 | 9 | 7 | 14 | 45 | 53 | −8 | 34 (Note: Haguenau 2–0 Belfort, Belfort 0–3 Haguenau. Haguenau 6 points, Belfort 0 points.) | |
| 12 | Belfort | 30 | 9 | 7 | 14 | 34 | 43 | −9 | 34 | |
| 13 | Metz (res) | 30 | 8 | 7 | 15 | 31 | 39 | −8 | 31 | |
| 14 | Schiltigheim (R) | 30 | 5 | 13 | 12 | 24 | 33 | −9 | 28 | Relegation to National 3 |
| 15 | Lens (res) (R) | 30 | 4 | 12 | 14 | 26 | 46 | −20 | 24 (Note: Lens (res) 1–0 Entente SSG, Entente SSG 1–0 Lens (res). Lens (res) 3 points +0 goal difference, Entente SSG 3 points +0 goal difference. Overall goal difference applies.) | Relegation to National 3 |
| 16 | Entente SSG (R) | 30 | 7 | 3 | 20 | 20 | 46 | −26 | 24 | Relegation to National 3 |

Source: soccerway
Rules for classification: 1) points; 2) head-to-head results; 3) head-to-head goal difference; 4) goal difference; 5) number of goals scored; 6) fair play points; 7) draw
(C) Champions; (P) Promoted; (R) Relegated

=== Group C ===
| Pos | Team | Pld | W | D | L | GF | GA | GD | Pts | Promotion or relegation |
|---|---|---|---|---|---|---|---|---|---|---|
| 1 | Martigues (C, P) | 30 | 17 | 9 | 4 | 48 | 29 | +19 | 60 | Promotion to National |
| 2 | Grasse | 30 | 15 | 9 | 6 | 41 | 29 | +12 | 54 | |
| 3 | GOAL FC | 30 | 14 | 9 | 7 | 51 | 29 | +22 | 51 | |
| 4 | Fréjus Saint-Raphaël | 30 | 13 | 8 | 9 | 34 | 27 | +7 | 47 | |
| 5 | Jura Sud Foot | 30 | 13 | 6 | 11 | 46 | 42 | +4 | 45 | |
| 6 | Louhans-Cuiseaux | 30 | 11 | 10 | 9 | 39 | 29 | +10 | 43 | |
| 7 | Aubagne (Note: On 4 January 2022, Aubagne were deducted two points by the DNCG (Financial Control Board of the FFF).) | 30 | 10 | 12 | 8 | 37 | 32 | +5 | 40 | |
| 8 | Hyères | 30 | 9 | 12 | 9 | 34 | 34 | 0 | 39 | |
| 9 | Toulon | 30 | 9 | 11 | 10 | 30 | 29 | +1 | 38 (Note: Toulon 2–1 Lyon (res), Lyon (res) 0–0 Toulon. Toulon 4 points, Lyon (res) 1 point.) | |
| 10 | Lyon (res) | 30 | 10 | 8 | 12 | 31 | 43 | −12 | 38 | |
| 11 | Saint-Priest | 30 | 10 | 7 | 13 | 37 | 38 | −1 | 37 (Note: Saint-Priest 0–0 Marignane Gignac, Marignane Gignac 0–1 Saint-Priest. Saint-Priest 4 points, Marignane Gignac 1 point.) | |
| 12 | Marignane Gignac | 30 | 10 | 7 | 13 | 29 | 35 | −6 | 37 | |
| 13 | Lyon La Duchère | 30 | 8 | 9 | 13 | 36 | 43 | −7 | 33 | |
| 14 | Monaco (res) (R) | 30 | 8 | 8 | 14 | 34 | 48 | −14 | 32 (Note: Monaco (res) 2–2 Rumilly-Vallières, Rumilly-Vallières 1–2 Monaco (res). Monaco (res) 4 points, Rumilly-Vallières 1 point.) | Relegation to National 3 |
| 15 | Rumilly-Vallières (R) | 30 | 8 | 8 | 14 | 27 | 39 | −12 | 32 | Relegation to National 3 |
| 16 | Marseille (res) (R) | 30 | 7 | 3 | 20 | 31 | 59 | −28 | 24 | Relegation to National 3 |

Source: soccerway
Rules for classification: 1) points; 2) head-to-head results; 3) head-to-head goal difference; 4) goal difference; 5) number of goals scored; 6) fair play points; 7) draw
(C) Champions; (P) Promoted; (R) Relegated

=== Group D ===
| Pos | Team | Pld | W | D | L | GF | GA | GD | Pts | Promotion or relegation |
|---|---|---|---|---|---|---|---|---|---|---|
| 1 | Le Puy (C, P) | 30 | 18 | 7 | 5 | 40 | 17 | +23 | 61 | Promotion to National |
| 2 | Bergerac | 30 | 17 | 9 | 4 | 38 | 16 | +22 | 60 | |
| 3 | Bourges Foot 18 | 30 | 17 | 5 | 8 | 46 | 25 | +21 | 56 | |
| 4 | Andrézieux | 30 | 15 | 6 | 9 | 43 | 30 | +13 | 51 | |
| 5 | Angoulême | 30 | 13 | 10 | 7 | 33 | 25 | +8 | 49 | |
| 6 | Béziers (Note: Béziers relegated by the DNCG due to financial mismanagement. The decision was upheld on appeal.) (R) | 30 | 13 | 8 | 9 | 45 | 36 | +9 | 47 | Relegation to National 3 |
| 7 | Moulins Yzeure | 30 | 11 | 11 | 8 | 33 | 28 | +5 | 44 | |
| 8 | Canet Roussillon (Note: The match between Le Puy and Canet Roussillon, scheduled for 5 February 2022, was postponed due to COVID-19 cases in the Canet Roussillon team. On 14 April 2022 the FFF found that Canet Roussillon had provided PCR test results with questionable authenticity, in order to justify the postponement of the match. The FFF deducted Canet Roussillon 10 points for the offence. Furthermore, they awarded the postponed match to Le Puy by a scoreline of 3–0, with a further penalty point deducted from Canet Roussillon.) | 30 | 14 | 6 | 10 | 35 | 36 | −1 | 37 (Note: Canet Roussillon 2–1 Les Herbiers. Les Herbiers 0–1 Canet Roussillon. Canet Roussillon 6 points, Les Herbiers 0 points.) | |
| 9 | Les Herbiers | 30 | 9 | 10 | 11 | 31 | 34 | −3 | 37 | |
| 10 | Trélissac | 30 | 9 | 8 | 13 | 27 | 34 | −7 | 35 | |
| 11 | Nantes (res) | 30 | 8 | 10 | 12 | 33 | 37 | −4 | 34 | |
| 12 | Angers (res) | 30 | 7 | 12 | 11 | 27 | 32 | −5 | 33 | |
| 13 | Chamalières | 30 | 8 | 8 | 14 | 30 | 41 | −11 | 32 | |
| 14 | Montpellier (res) (R) | 30 | 8 | 6 | 16 | 33 | 44 | −11 | 30 | Relegation to National 3 |
| 15 | Colomiers (R) | 30 | 6 | 9 | 15 | 30 | 46 | −16 | 27 | Relegation to National 3 |
| 16 | Mont-de-Marsan (R) | 30 | 1 | 7 | 22 | 24 | 67 | −43 | 10 | Relegation to National 3 |

Source: soccerway
Rules for classification: 1) points; 2) head-to-head results; 3) head-to-head goal difference; 4) goal difference; 5) number of goals scored; 6) fair play points; 7) draw
(C) Champions; (P) Promoted; (R) Relegated

== Top scorers ==
As of 28 May 2022.

| Rank | Player | Club | Goals |
|---|---|---|---|
| 1 | (France) Anthony Petrilli | Fleury | 23 |
| 2 | (France) Abdoulaye Diallo | Andrézieux | 19 |
| 3 | (France) Jordan Popineau | Blois | 17 |
| 4 | (Algeria) Mokhtar Benarbia | Aubagne | 16 |
| 4 | (France) Sébastien Persico | Vannes | 16 |
| 4 | (France) Steven Nsimba | Bourges Foot 18 | 16 |
| 7 | (France) Rayan Ghrieb | Schiltigheim | 14 |
| 8 | (Senegal) Sambou Soumano | Lorient (res) | 13 |
| 8 | (France) Maxime Pélican | Moulins Yzeure | 13 |
| 8 | (France) Claudy M'Buyi | Jura Sud Foot | 13 |
| 8 | (France) Mouya Ipiélé | Sainte-Geneviève | 13 |

== Season outcomes ==
=== Promotion ===
Versailles, Martigues, Paris 13 Atletico and Le Puy were champions of each group, and were promoted to 2022–23 Championnat National, subject to the usual ratification by the FFF and DNCG.

=== Relegation ===
Romorantin, Plabennec, Vitré, Schiltigheim, Lens (res), Entente SSG, Monaco (res), Rumilly-Vallières, Marseille (res), Montpellier (res), Colomiers and Mont-de-Marsan finished in the relegation places, and were relegated to 2022–23 Championnat National 3, subject to any reprieves detailed in the next section.

=== Reprieves ===
Any reprieves required due to administrative relegations, mergers or clubs folding will be decided by taking, in order, the 14th placed clubs ranked by order of their record against clubs finishing 9th to 13th position in their group, followed by the 15th placed clubs ranked by order of their record against clubs finishing in 10th to 14th position in their group.

On 14 June 2022, the DNCG announced that Béziers were to be relegated to Championnat National 3 for the 2022–23 season, due to financial mismanagement. The decision was upheld on appeal, and Romorantin were reprieved from relegation.
