= Lucas Daury =

French footballer (born 1995)

Personal information
- Date of birth: 24 August 1995 (age 31)
- Place of birth: Harfleur, France
- Height: 1.83 m (6 ft 0 in)
- Position: Midfielder

Team information
- Current team: Saint-Malo
- Number: 7

Youth career
- –2014: Valenciennes

Senior career*
Years	Team	Apps	(Gls)
2013–2015	Valenciennes B	48	(12)
2014	Valenciennes	1	(0)
2015–2017	Boulogne B	19	(4)
2015–2017	Boulogne	31	(5)
2017–2018	Sedan	21	(5)
2018–2020	Quevilly-Rouen	19	(4)
2019–2020	Quevilly-Rouen B	8	(1)
2020	→ Blois (loan)	5	(0)
2020–2021	Gazélec Ajaccio	9	(3)
2021–2022	Vannes	27	(2)
2022–2024	Les Herbiers	37	(8)
2024–	Saint-Malo	35	(6)
- * Club domestic league appearances and goals as of 4 December 2025

Lucas Daury (born 24 August 1995) is a French professional footballer who plays as a midfielder for Championnat National 1 club Saint-Malo.

== Career ==
Daury is a youth product of Valenciennes. He made his Ligue 2 debut on 1 August 2014 against Gazélec Ajaccio in a 2–0 away defeat.

On 15 July 2020, it was confirmed that Duary had joined Gazélec Ajaccio on a one-year deal. In 2022, he signed for Les Herbiers.
