= Cyril Hennion =

French footballer (born 1992)

Personal information
- Full name: Cyril Hennion
- Date of birth: 3 January 1992 (age 34)
- Place of birth: France
- Position: Midfielder

Team information
- Current team: FC Villefranche

Senior career*
Years	Team	Apps	(Gls)
2010–2012	OGC Nice	4	(0)
2012–2014	OGC Nice II	24	(2)
2015–2016	Fréjus Saint-Raphaël	55	(1)
2017–	Villefranche SJB	20	(0)
- * Club domestic league appearances and goals as of 24 May 2018 ‡ National team caps and goals as of 1 September 2012

Cyril Hennion (born 3 January 1992) is a French footballer who plays as a midfielder for Villefranche SJB.
