= Marck =

Marck may refer to:

== Surname ==
- Érard de La Marck (1472–1538), prince-bishop of Liège
- Jan van der Marck (1929–2010) Dutch-born American art historian, and museum curator.
- John T. Marck, Beatles biographer who suggested that "Real Love", which reunited the Beatles, might have its origins in a John and Yoko stage play concept
- Robert III de La Marck (1491–1537), marshal of France and historian
- William I de La Marck (1446–1485), had Prince-Bishop of Liège assassinated, which started a civil war
- William II de La Marck (1542–1578), Lord of Lumey and initially admiral of the Gueux de mer

== Other ==
- Marck, Pas-de-Calais, a commune in northern France
- AS Marck, association football club based in Marck
- County of Mark or Marck, a former county in southern Westphalia, Germany
