= FC Saint-Lô Manche =

French football club

Saint-Lô
- Full name: Football Club Saint-Lô Manche
- Founded: 1965
- Ground: Stade Louis Villemer, Saint-Lô
- Capacity: 5,000
- Chairman: Dominique Demouy
- Manager: Stéphane Chapalain
- League: Régional 1
- 2024–25: National 3 Group C, 14th of 14 (Relegated)
Home colours	Away colours

Football Club Saint-Lô Manche is a French association football club founded in 1965. They are based in the town of Saint-Lô and their home stadium is the Stade Louis Villemer, which has a capacity of 5,000 spectators. As of the 2025–26 season, the club plays in the Régional 1.

== Players ==
=== Current squad ===
As of 4 April 2019.

Note: Flags indicate national team as defined under FIFA eligibility rules; some limited exceptions apply. Players may hold more than one non-FIFA nationality.

No.	Pos.	Nation	Player
—	GK	FRA	Xavier Gallien
—	DF	FRA	Joël Lembo
—	DF	FRA	Edouard Gosselin
—	DF	FRA	Florian Guenerie
—	DF	FRA	Jean-Marc Hatchi
—	DF	FRA	Kevin Kopphy
—	DF	FRA	Pierre Havin
—	DF	FRA	Simon Colette
—	DF	FRA	Paul Joli
—	MF	FRA	Alexandre Marie
—	MF	FRA	Florian Depraute

No.	Pos.	Nation	Player
—	MF	FRA	William Coulibaly
—	MF	FRA	Noé Croci
—	MF	FRA	Maxime Roynel
—	MF	FRA	Benoit Gouesmel
—	FW	FRA	Gérard Bopu
—	FW	FRA	Thomas Vauvy
—	FW	FRA	Tony Lambard
—	FW	FRA	Jimmy Bonnemains
—	FW	FRA	Quentin Le Bedel
—	FW	FRA	Tristan Matuba

== Honours ==
- DH Basse-Normandie (2) 2008-09, 2011-12
- Normandie Group B (1) 2025-26
- Coupe de Basse-Normandie (2) 1990-91, 2008-09

== Notable Former Managers ==
- (France) Jean-Louis Coustillet (1984–88)
- (France) Alain Merchadier (1988–90)
