= Abdelmounaïm El Hajaoui =

Moroccan footballer

Personal information
- Date of birth: August 30, 1984 (age 42)
- Place of birth: Er Rachidia, Morocco
- Height: 1.70 m (5 ft 7 in)
- Positions: Midfielder; striker

Team information
- Current team: ASFAC Frontignan

Youth career
- Castelnau Le Crès

Senior career*
| Years | Team | Apps | (Gls) |
| 2003–2009 | Sète 34 | 60 | (11) |
| 2009–2010 | Nîmes | 12 | (0) |
| 2010–2011 | Paris FC | 15 | (2) |
| 2011–2012 | Hassania Agadir | 11 | (0) |
| 2012–2013 | Salé | ? | (?) |
| 2013–2016 | Perpignan Canet | ? | (?) |
| 2016– | ASFAC Frontignan | ? | (?) |
- * Club domestic league appearances and goals as of 13:54, 9 June 2020 (UTC)

Abdelmounaïm El Hajaoui (born 30 August 1984) is a Moroccan footballer currently playing for French lower league side ASFAC Frontignan. He has formerly played in the Ligue 2 for Nîmes Olympique, as well as Paris FC and Sète 34.
