= Nicolas Desenclos =

French footballer (born 1989)

Personal information
- Full name: Nicolas Gilbert Raymond Desenclos
- Date of birth: 11 February 1989 (age 37)
- Place of birth: Marseille, France
- Height: 1.88 m (6 ft 2 in)
- Position: Defender

Youth career
- 2005–2007: Montpellier
- 2007: Izola
- 2007: Triestina
- 2007–2008: Internazionale

Senior career*
Years	Team	Apps	(Gls)
2008–2011	Internazionale	0	(0)
2008–2009	→ Racing de Ferrol (loan)	?	(?)
2009–2011	→ Eupen (loan)	6	(0)
2012	Chamois Niortais	12	(0)
2012–2013	Luzenac	17	(0)
2014–	Trélissac	28	(0)
- * Club domestic league appearances and goals

Nicolas Desenclos (born 11 February 1989) is a French footballer.

== Biography ==
=== Early career ===
Born in Marseille, Desenclos started his career in Montpellier. In mid-2007 he moved to Italian champion Internazionale and played in pre-season friendlies. He then allegedly sold to Triestina in co-ownership deal, but remained in Inter's reserve.

However, Inter in fact borrowed Triestina's license to sign him from Izola and Triestina "sold" him to Inter in co-own deal for €530,000; Izola itself signed him from Montpellier. Triestina paid Izola €400,000 to sign Desenclos; Michel Orneck for €300,000 and Thierry Audel for €200,000, which the liquidator accused for false accounting.

In June 2008 the co-ownership deal was renewed. (but terminated during 2008–09 season) On 30 August, he moved to Spanish Segunda División B. That season the team finished as the seventh.

=== Eupen ===
On 31 August 2009 he moved to Belgian Second Division side Eupen along with Sulaiman Sesay Fullah. Desenclos played 5 times in the second division and played in the playoffs, which the team promoted. After the season, he remained with Eupen but only played once: in 2010–11 Belgian Cup. However, he returned to starting XI for second division playoffs to decide which team secured the last berth to 2011–12 Belgian Pro League, as Eupen winning Pro League relegation playoffs against last placed Charleroi. He started the fifth match as Eupen mathematically relegated (or fail to win the playoffs).

During 2011–12 season his contract with Inter was terminated with mutual consent.
