= Gabriel Etinof =

French footballer (born 1996)

Personal information
- Full name: Gabriel Etinof
- Date of birth: 12 January 1996 (age 30)
- Place of birth: Orsay, France
- Height: 1.66 m (5 ft 5 in)
- Position: Winger

Senior career*
Years	Team	Apps	(Gls)
2014–2018	Laval II	51	(8)
2014–2019	Laval	74	(7)
2017	→ ASM Belfort (loan)	10	(1)
2019–2020	SO Cholet	6	(0)
- * Club domestic league appearances and goals as of 20:19, 31 March 2020 (UTC)

Gabriel Etinof (born 12 January 1996) is a French footballer who plays as a winger.

== Career ==
On 23 May 2019, Etinof signed for Spanish club Real Zaragoza on a four-year contract, but the move was declared void by the club on 13 June, as the player failed his medical. On 23 November 2019, he then joined SO Cholet. However, two and a half months later, on 12 February 2020, his contract was terminated by mutual agreement.
