= Kévin Dupuis =

French footballer (born 1987)

Personal information
- Full name: Kévin Dupuis
- Date of birth: 14 January 1987 (age 39)
- Place of birth: Marseille, France
- Height: 1.87 m (6 ft 2 in)
- Position: Striker

Youth career
- 1997–1999: Marseille
- 1999–2001: Burel
- 2001–2007: Toulouse

Senior career*
Years	Team	Apps	(Gls)
2007–2010	Toulouse	6	(1)
2008–2009	→ Rodez (loan)	25	(5)
2010–2012	Châteauroux	45	(15)
2012–2014	KV Kortrijk	15	(0)
2013–2014	→ Châteauroux (loan)	25	(5)
2014–2015	Lausanne-Sport	23	(6)
2015–2017	Orléans	45	(11)
2017–2018	US Créteil	0	(0)

International career^{‡}
2004	France U17	1	(0)
- * Club domestic league appearances and goals ‡ National team caps and goals as of 25 June 2017 (UTC)

Kévin Dupuis (born 14 January 1987) is a French former professional footballer who played as a striker. He is a former French youth international, having earned a solitary cap for the under-17 team.

Dupuis began his professional career at Toulouse, and made his professional debut with the club in the 2007–08 season. He struggled to make an impact within the team primarily due to injuries and was, subsequently, loaned out to Championnat National club Rodez for the 2008–09 season. After a successful campaign, Dupuis returned to Toulouse and was given an opportunity to play with the first team. He scored his first career goal for the club in the 2009–10 season, but was unable to bypass the prolific goalscorer André-Pierre Gignac. In June 2010, Dupuis joined Châteauroux on a two-year contract. He joined KV Kortrijk in 2012, and subsequently played for Lausanne-Sport, Orléans and US Créteil.

== Career ==
=== Early career ===
Dupuis was born in the city of Marseille, but was raised in nearby Le Rove. As a result, he sought to play for the biggest club in the city, Olympique de Marseille. Dupuis began his career at Marseille, but after three years of training, he was passed over. Dupuis, subsequently, joined local club Burel FC, located only 20 kilometres (12 mi) from Marseille. While at Burel, he was described by one of his coaches as a "natural leader", a "winner", and a "perfectionist". Dupuis eventually went on to establish himself as one of the club's best prospects. In 2001, he began drawing interest from several professional clubs, which included Monaco, Toulouse, Sochaux, Lens, and Bastia. Dupuis eventually settled for Toulouse and was inserted into the club's academy at the age of 14.

=== Toulouse ===
Upon his arrival, Dupuis quickly impressed in the club's youth system, which led to interest from the French Football Federation, who called the player up to the under-17 team to participate in the Algarve Cup. In 2005, he was a centerpiece in the Toulouse under-19 team, alongside Walid Cherfa, Kevin Constant, and Thomas Ayasse, that won the Coupe Gambardella. In the final, Toulouse faced a talented Olympique Lyonnais team composed of Karim Benzema and Hatem Ben Arfa. Dupuis scored two goals in the match as Toulouse cruised to a 6–2 victory. In the 2005–06 season, after graduating from the club's youth academy, he was promoted to the club's reserve team in the Championnat de France amateur.

Dupuis struggled to make an impact in his first season with the reserve team and was described by Pascal Sempé, the club's youth director, as a "great talent, but inconsistent". He appeared in only 12 matches scoring no goals in the 2006–07 amateur campaign. The following season marked a dramatic improvement for Dupuis as he appeared in 20 matches and scored 11 goals; second-best on the team behind strike partner Xavier Pentecôte. In January 2007, due to his consistent performances in the reserve team, Dupuis was called up to the senior team and trained with the team for the duration of the 2006–07 season, however he did not make an appearance. Dupuis was slated to make his professional debut on 9 March 2007 in a league match against Monaco. He trained with the team during the pre-game, however, towards the ending of warm-ups, Dupuis sprained his ankle. After medical analysis, it was discovered that he ruptured ligaments. Dupuis missed the rest of the campaign. Despite the injury, in April, he signed his first professional contract agreeing to a three-year deal until 2010. He was, subsequently, promoted to the first team for the 2007–08 season and assigned the number 18 shirt.

In the training camp leading up to the season, Dupuis struggled with another ankle injury. He also succumbed to many injuries during the season, which resulted in his play being limited. Dupuis made his professional debut on 26 September 2007 in a Coupe de la Ligue match against Caen. He appeared as a substitute in the match for Moussa Sissoko in the second half as Toulouse suffered defeat losing 4–3 on penalties. The following month, Dupuis made his European debut in a 1–0 defeat to German club Bayer Leverkusen in the UEFA Cup. He finished the campaign with an appearance in the club's surprising 2–1 defeat to Paris in the Coupe de France and another appearance against Russian club Spartak Moscow in the UEFA Cup.

Loan to Rodez

Ahead of the 2008–09 season, Dupuis trialed with recently promoted Ligue 2 club Vannes with hopes of securing a loan. The trial eventually proved inconclusive and Toulouse instead loaned the player to nearby club Rodez AF in the Championnat National, the third level of French football. Dupuis made his debut for the club on 9 August in a 2–1 league victory over Niort. He scored his first goal for the club on 5 September netting the opener in a 3–1 win against Calais. Dupuis later added another goal in the same match. In the Coupe de France, Dupuis helped Rodez reach the quarterfinals scoring two goals in six appearances. The season was ultimately a success for Dupuis personally, however, Rodez ultimately finished the league campaign in 15th; two spots off of relegation. After the season, Dupuis returned to Toulouse.

Return to Toulouse

Despite returning to Toulouse for the 2009–10 season, the club was open to Dupuis possibility finding a new club, primarily due to the player only having one year left on his contract. Dupuis trialed with Cannes, but his stint there was ultimately abandoned after he suffered a sprained knee while training. He returned to Toulouse and, due to not being in manager Alain Casanova's plans, was relegated to the club's Championnat de France amateur 2 team in the fifth division, where was named captain of the team. However, in January 2010, after having a positive stint with the reserves, Casanova called Dupuis back to the senior team. On 13 January, Dupuis made his first professional start for the team against Nancy in the Coupe de la Ligue. In the match, Dupuis scored his first professional goal for the club netting the final goal in a 3–0 win. Three days later, he finally made his league debut for the club in a 3–1 win over Valenciennes. On 27 February, he scored the game-winning goal in a 1–0 win at home against Lens. Dupuis appeared in two more league matches before bowing out of the team. On 31 June 2010, after running through the duration of his contract, Dupuis departed the club after a nine-year stay.

=== Châteauroux ===
Despite being linked to numerous other clubs in Ligue 2, on 16 June 2010, Dupuis signed a two-year deal with LB Châteauroux. Dupuis described the move as a "new challenge" and that he made the move after being assured of increased playing time by the club's president Serge Marchetti and incoming manager Didier Tholot. He made his debut for the club on 30 July in a 3–2 defeat against Laval in the Coupe de la Ligue. Dupuis scored his first goal for Châteauroux 17 August in a 2–1 victory over Le Havre. The following week, he scored again, this time in a 2–0 victory against Le Mans. In October, Dupuis went on a scoring tear netting three goals in four matches. Châteauroux, however, won only one of the four matches. To close out the fall season, Dupuis scored goals in back-to-back weeks against Angers and Boulogne-sur-Mer to bring his total out in goals to seven.

=== KV Kortrijk ===
On 17 May 2012 it was announced that he would join Belgian club KV Kortrijk for the 2012–13 season on a free transfer. He signed a three-year contract with the club.

In July 2013, Dupuis returned to LB Châteauroux on a season-long loan.

=== Later career ===
In July 2014, he transferred to Swiss club Lausanne-Sport of the Swiss Challenge League.

After a season at Lausanne Sport, Dupuis joined Championnat National club Orléans. Following an injury, he underwent hernia surgery in September 2016. He left the club at the end of his contract in July 2017.

In June 2017, he joined US Créteil on a one-year contract with an option for an additional year.

== Honours ==
=== Club ===
- Toulouse
  - Coupe Gambardella: 2005
