= FC Mantois 78 =

French football club

FC Mantois
- Full name: Football Club Mantois 78
- Founded: 1944; 82 years ago 1994; 32 years ago (As FC Mantois 78)
- Ground: Stade Aimé Bergeal; Mantes-la-Ville, Yvelines
- Capacity: 5,000
- Chairman: Eric Aderdor
- Manager: Robert Mendy
- League: Régional 1 Paris-Île-de-France
- 2021–22: National 3 Group L, 13th (relegated)
- Website: fcmantois.com
Home colours	Away colours

Football Club Mantois 78 are a French football club that was founded in 1994. The club is based in Mantes-la-Ville in the suburbs of Paris and is of the Yvelines department. The club's relatively late foundation is due to a merger between three other clubs from the region. The club is often referred to as FC Mantes due to their location, however, their common name is FC Mantois with Mantois being the natural region of the area the club inhabits.

== History ==
The club's parent club before their foundation was Athletic Club de Mantes-la-Ville, who reached the CFA in 1968 and ultimately reached as far as Division 2, where they remained for four years before plunging down to the sixth division of French football. In 1994, the club merged with two other local clubs, Association sportive de Mantes and Association sportive de Buchelay to form the club that exists today. After a decade at the fourth level of French football, the club was relegated to Championnat National 3 in 2020 after being positioned bottom of 2019–20 Championnat National 2 Group B when the season was curtailed due to the COVID-19 pandemic. They were relegated again in 2021–22, to the sixth tier, having twice being deducted points during the season.

== Current squad ==
As of 7 November 2019

Note: Flags indicate national team as defined under FIFA eligibility rules; some limited exceptions apply. Players may hold more than one non-FIFA nationality.

No.	Pos.	Nation	Player
—	GK	FRA	Christian Basse
—	GK	FRA	Alexandre Menay
—	DF	FRA	Mark Amoah
—	DF	FRA	Malamina Diabira
—	DF	FRA	Mamadou Keita
—	DF	FRA	Dominique Omari
—	MF	FRA	Brahim Baradji
—	MF	FRA	Bakary Diabira
—	MF	MLI	Phousseyne Diaby
—	MF	BEL	Thomas Diaby
—	MF	FRA	Demba Diallo
—	MF	FRA	Arslane Guedioura
—	MF	FRA	Alexandre Isidor
—	MF	SEN	Germain Loppy
—	MF	FRA	Earvin Lungu

No.	Pos.	Nation	Player
—	MF	FRA	Mamadou Savane
—	MF	FRA	Abdou Thiam
—	FW	FRA	Jeremy Balmy
—	FW	FRA	Diakaria Dembélé
—	FW	FRA	Oumar Diao
—	FW	FRA	Youness El Baillal
—	FW	FRA	Willson Guella
—	FW	FRA	Isaac Mensah
—	FW	SEN	Dominique Miquilan
—	FW	FRA	Nael Selemani
—		FRA	Yassine Belkdim
—		FRA	Richard Bonsu
—		FRA	Othman Kaamouchi
—		FRA	Erwan Mendy
—		FRA	Willemin

== Notable players ==
- (France) Ferland Mendy (youth)
- (France) Yann M'Vila (youth)
- (Senegal) Moussa Sow (youth)
- (France) Robinio Vaz (youth)
