= 2015–16 Championnat National =

Championnat National
- Season: 2015–16
- Champions: Strasbourg
- Promoted: Strasbourg; Orléans; Amiens
- Relegated: Luçon; Colmar; Fréjus
- Matches: 306
- Goals: 723 (2.36 per match)

The 2015–16 Championnat National season was the 18th season since its establishment. The previous season's champions were Red Star.

== Teams ==
=== Stadia and locations ===
Club	Location	Venue	Capacity
Amiens	Amiens	Stade de la Licorne	12,097
Avranches	Avranches	Stade René Fenouillère	800
CA Bastia	Bastia	Stade d'Erbajolo^{1}	2,000
Belfort	Belfort	Stade Roger Serzian	5,500
Béziers	Béziers	Stade de Sauclières	12,000
Boulogne	Boulogne-sur-Mer	Stade de la Libération	15,004
Chambly	Chambly	Stade des Marais	1,000
Châteauroux	Châteauroux	Stade Gaston Petit	17,072
Colmar	Colmar	Colmar Stadium	7,000
Dunkerque	Dunkerque	Stade Marcel-Tribut	4,200
Épinal	Épinal	Stade de la Colombière	8,000
Fréjus Saint-Raphaël	Fréjus	Stade Pourcin	2,500
Les Herbiers	Les Herbiers	Stade Massabielle	5,000
Luçon	Luçon	Stade Jean de Mouzon	7,000
Marseille-Consolat	Marseille	Stade La Martine	1,990
Orléans	Orléans	Stade de la Source	7,000
Sedan	Sedan	Stade Louis Dugauguez	23,189
Strasbourg	Strasbourg	Stade de la Meinau	29,000

- ^{1} Bastia failed to reach an agreement with the local government on the use of Stade Armand Cesari, the local professional stadium. As a result, they will play in their smaller original stadium, Stade d'Erbajolo, after a minor renovation. During this renovation, the team will play its home games in Stade Claude-Papi in Porto-Vecchio, after playing its first two home games at Stade Charles-Ehrmann in Nice, and Stade Jean-Filippi in Vescovato.

== League table ==
Pos	Team	Pld	W	D	L	GF	GA	GD	Pts	Promotion or Relegation
1	Strasbourg (C, P)	34	15	13	6	35	19	+16	58	Promotion to Ligue 2
2	Orléans (P)	34	14	14	6	50	37	+13	56	Promotion to Ligue 2
3	Amiens (P)	34	14	13	7	44	35	+9	55	Promotion to Ligue 2
4	Marseille Consolat	34	15	9	10	50	43	+7	54	
5	Châteauroux	34	14	10	10	52	45	+7	52	
6	Dunkerque	34	12	11	11	42	42	0	47	
7	Avranches	34	10	16	8	44	36	+8	46	
8	Boulogne	34	12	10	12	50	45	+5	46	
9	Chambly	34	11	11	12	46	40	+6	44	
10	Béziers	34	11	11	12	35	38	−3	44	
11	Luçon (Note: Luçon resigned due to financial difficulties. Les Herbiers was reprieved from relegation.) (D, R)	34	11	11	12	45	50	−5	44	Demotion to Division d'Honneur
12	Sedan	34	10	13	11	31	34	−3	43	
13	CA Bastia	34	10	13	11	29	33	−4	43	
14	Belfort	34	9	14	11	26	32	−6	41	
15	Les Herbiers	34	8	15	11	44	51	−7	39	
16	Colmar (Note: Colmar was assigned to Division d'Honneur (6th tier) after filing for insolvency. Épinal was reprieved from relegation.) (D, R, R)	34	10	9	15	39	46	−7	37	Demotion to Division d'Honneur
17	Épinal	34	6	12	16	39	53	−14	30	
18	Fréjus Saint-Raphaël (R)	34	4	15	15	22	44	−22	27	Relegation to Championnat de France Amateur

Source: foot-national.com
Rules for classification: 1) points; 2) head-to-head results; 3) head-to-head goal difference; 4) goal difference; 5) number of goals scored; 6) fair play points; 7) draw
(C) Champions; (D) Disqualified; (P) Promoted; (R) Relegated

== Results ==
Home \ Away	AMI	AVR	CAB	BEL	BÉZ	BOU	CHA	CHÂ	COL	DUN	ÉPI	FSR	LHV	LUÇ	MCO	ORL	SED	STR
Amiens		2–1	1–2	1–0	0–0	1–0	0–0	1–3	1–3	1–1	4–3	1–0	2–2	0–0	3–0	0–2	1–1	2–0
Avranches	0–2		1–3	1–1	0–0	3–1	1–1	2–0	1–1	2–0	0–0	1–1	0–0	1–0	2–2	3–2	0–0	0–0
CA Bastia	1–1	1–1		2–0	0–0	3–1	0–0	0–2	0–1	3–2	1–2	0–0	2–0	0–2	1–1	0–1	0–1	1–0
Belfort	2–1	1–4	0–0		4–0	1–2	1–0	1–1	0–0	0–0	2–0	0–0	1–0	2–1	0–1	1–1	0–0	0–0
Béziers	2–2	3–0	0–0	1–0		2–0	1–3	1–2	0–2	1–0	2–1	2–0	1–1	1–0	1–4	0–1	1–1	1–2
Boulogne	4–0	2–0	4–0	0–0	0–0		1–1	1–3	1–1	1–2	2–2	2–0	1–1	3–1	0–2	4–3	0–0	0–1
Chambly	0–1	1–1	2–2	6–2	2–0	1–1		1–2	1–2	1–0	3–1	3–2	4–0	2–1	1–2	1–2	1–1	0–2
Châteauroux	1–1	1–4	2–1	1–1	2–1	3–2	0–1		3–2	2–0	1–1	3–1	3–0	0–3	1–2	0–0	2–2	0–1
Colmar	1–1	2–1	0–2	0–2	0–2	0–1	1–1	1–0		1–2	1–0	2–2	2–1	0–1	1–2	1–1	4–0	0–3
Dunkerque	0–0	1–3	1–1	1–0	1–1	3–1	1–2	1–1	2–1		0–0	1–0	2–5	5–1	2–1	1–0	0–2	4–1
Épinal	2–1	1–3	1–1	0–1	1–1	1–1	3–1	1–1	2–1	3–1		0–1	2–1	2–2	1–1	1–1	0–2	0–1
Fréjus	0–1	0–0	0–0	0–1	0–2	1–4	1–1	1–0	1–1	0–2	0–0		1–1	3–2	1–1	1–4	1–1	1–0
Les Herbiers	1–3	2–1	1–0	1–1	3–1	3–3	1–0	3–4	2–1	1–1	2–1	1–1		0–0	3–0	0–0	2–2	0–0
Luçon	0–3	2–2	0–0	1–1	1–1	3–2	0–0	3–2	5–2	0–1	3–2	2–1	3–3		0–1	1–5	2–0	1–0
Marseille Consolat	0–2	0–3	1–2	3–0	1–5	0–2	3–2	2–0	1–1	0–0	4–2	3–0	3–0	1–2		1–1	4–1	0–0
Orléans	2–2	2–2	2–0	0–0	2–0	1–2	0–3	2–2	1–3	1–1	3–2	1–0	2–1	1–1	3–2		1–0	0–0
Sedan	1–1	0–0	0–1	1–0	1–0	1–2	3–0	0–3	1–2	3–1	2–0	0–0	1–0	2–0	0–1	1–2		0–0
Strasbourg	0–1	1–0	3–0	2–0	3–0	2–0	1–0	1–1	1–0	2–2	2–1	1–1	2–2	1–1	0–0	0–0	2–0	

Source: French Football Federation
Legend: Blue = home team win; Yellow = draw; Red = away team win.

== Top goalscorers ==
As of games played on 3 June 2016

Rank	Player	Club	Goals
1	(France) Farid Beziouen	Avranches	17
1	(France) Kévin Fortuné	Béziers	17
3	(France) Wilfried Louisy-Daniel	Chambly	15
3	(France) Grégory Thil	Boulogne	15
5	(France) Romain Armand	Orléans	12
5	(Benin) Jonathan Tinhan	Amiens	12
5	(France) Oumare Tounkara	Châteauroux	12
8	(France) Kévin Dupuis	Orléans	11
8	(Senegal) Adama Sarr	Les Hebiers	11
8	(France) Jean-Philippe Mateta	Châteauroux	11

Source: Scoresway

== Attendances ==
#	Club	Average
1	Strasbourg	15,317
2	Amiens	5,285
3	La Berrichonne	3,938
4	Sedan	3,059
5	Orléans	2,306
6	Boulogne	2,106
7	Colmar	1,821
8	Les Herbiers	1,640
9	Belfort	1,300
10	Dunkerque	1,196
11	Luçon	982
12	Consolat	964
13	Avranches	907
14	Béziers	879
15	Chambly	840
16	Étoile	839
17	Épinal	616
18	CA Bastia	344
