= US Saint-Malo =

French football club

- Full name: Union Sportive Saint-Malo
- Nickname: Les Diables Noirs (The Black Devils)
- Founded: 1901
- Ground: Stade de Marville; Saint-Malo
- Chairman: Yves Fantou
- Manager: Gwenaël Corbin
- League: National 1 Group B
- 2024–25: National 2 Group B, 3rd of 16
- Website: https://www.ussm.fr
Home colours	Away colours

Union Sportive Saint-Malo (French: [ynjɔ̃ spɔʁtiv sɛ̃ malo]) is a French association football club founded in 1901. They are based in the town of Saint-Malo and their home stadium is Stade Marville. As of the 2025–26 season, they play in the Championnat National 1.

== Current squad ==
As of 1 December 2025

Note: Flags indicate national team as defined under FIFA eligibility rules; some limited exceptions apply. Players may hold more than one non-FIFA nationality.

No.	Pos.	Nation	Player
1	GK	FRA	Corentin Escandre
3	DF	FRA	Nathanaël Bai
6	MF	FRA	Pierre Magnon
7	MF	FRA	Lucas Daury
8	MF	FRA	Tom Lebeau
9	FW	FRA	Junior Burban
10	MF	FRA	Sofiane Barroug
11	FW	GUI	Djibril Bangoura
12	DF	FRA	Tom Duponchelle
14	DF	FRA	Alexis Taïpa
17	FW	FRA	Lucas Capoue

No.	Pos.	Nation	Player
20	FW	FRA	Antoine Verronneau
21	MF	GUF	Ullrich Pereira Souza
22	DF	FRA	Antoine Cottereau
23	DF	FRA	Thibaut Cillard
25	DF	FRA	Tommy Le Verge
26	DF	FRA	Edouard Daillet
27	DF	FRA	Augustin Pascaud
33	MF	MAR	Chouaïb Jikouni
40	GK	FRA	Clément Milon
—	MF	CMR	Kwouni Ngassa
