= US Granville =

French association football club

- Full name: L'Union Sportive Granville
- Founded: 1918
- Ground: Stade Louis Dior, Granville
- Capacity: 3,200
- Chairman: Benjamin Bahu
- Manager: Sylvain Didot
- League: National 2 Group B
- 2023–24: National 2 Group C, 3rd of 14
- Website: usgranville.fr
Home colours	Away colours

Union Sportive Granville, commonly referred to as US Granville or simply Granville, is a French football club based in Granville in the Lower Normandy region.

== History ==
The club was founded in 1918 and currently plays in the Championnat de France amateur 2, the fifth division of French football, after most recently achieving promotion from the Division d'Honneur in the 2013–14 season. Granville share a partnership with nearby professional club SM Caen.

In season 2015–16 they had a fantastic run in the Coupe de France, eventually losing in the quarter finals:

Round	H/A	Opponent (tier)	Score
Round 1	N/A	Bye	N/A
Round 2	N/A	Bye	N/A
Round 3	A	Etoile S Thury Harcourt (10)	0–8
Round 4	H	AF Virois (6)	3-1 (AET)
Round 5	A	US Ouviere Normande Mondeville (6)	0-1 (AET)
Round 6	A	AS Cherbourg Football (6)	1–3
Round 7	H	SU Dives (6)	2–0
Round 8	A	AF Saint-Nazaire (6)	0–2
Round of 64	H	Stade Lavallois (2)	2–1
Round of 32	H	Sarreguemines FC (5)	3–1
Round of 16	H	Bourg-Péronnas (2)	1-0 (AET)
Quarterfinals	H	Olympique de Marseille (1)	0–1

In 2018, Granville beat Girondins de Bordeaux 2–1 in extra time, on 32e of Coupe de France.

== Current squad ==
As of 4 December 2025

Note: Flags indicate national team as defined under FIFA eligibility rules; some limited exceptions apply. Players may hold more than one non-FIFA nationality.

No.	Pos.	Nation	Player
1	GK	FRA	Anthony Herbin
2	DF	FRA	Pierrick Mouniama
3	DF	FRA	Théo Emmanuelli
4	DF	FRA	Mathis Lemeray
7	FW	FRA	Bilal Traoré
8	MF	FRA	Mouhamed Coulibaly
9	FW	FRA	Kenny Herbin
10	FW	FRA	Enzo Misse
11	MF	CIV	Yves Djédjé
14	MF	FRA	Makan Sidibé
16	GK	FRA	Mathieu Bouteloup
17	DF	FRA	Amay Caprice

No.	Pos.	Nation	Player
18	MF	FRA	Sofiane Hamard
19	DF	FRA	Diakari Diarra
20	MF	CGO	Fulgency Kimbembé
21	DF	FRA	Sacha Lemarié
22	MF	FRA	Tom Lepenant
24	DF	FRA	Franck Mefouma
25	MF	FRA	Hugo Rubio
28	FW	FRA	Mathis Cherchour
29	FW	FRA	Kylian Silvestre
30	GK	FRA	Isaia Hubert
32	FW	GUI	Mohamed Keita
—	MF	FRA	Ilann Adam Gaspard

== Honours ==
- DH Normandie (1) 1968-69
- DH Basse-Normandie (3) 1989-90, 2009-10, 2013-14
- Coupe de Basse-Normandie (3) 1981-82, 1988-89, 1993-94

== Famous players ==
- (France) Johann Lepenant (youth)
