= 2022–23 Coupe de France =

Football tournament season

Tournament details
- Country: France
- Dates: 22 May 2022 – 29 April 2023
- Teams: 7,292

Final positions
- Champions: Toulouse (1st title)
- Runners-up: Nantes

Tournament statistics
- Matches played: 184
- Goals scored: 514 (2.79 per match)
- Top goal scorer(s): Thijs Dallinga (6 goals)

The 2022–23 Coupe de France was the 106th season of the main football cup competition of France. The competition was organised by the French Football Federation (FFF) and was open to all clubs in French football, as well as clubs from the overseas departments and territories (Guadeloupe, French Guiana, Martinique, Mayotte, New Caledonia, Tahiti, Réunion, Saint Martin, and Saint Pierre and Miquelon).

Nantes were the defending champions, having beaten Nice 1–0 in the previous year's final to claim their fourth Coupe de France title. Toulouse defeated Nantes 5–1 in the 2023 final for a first Coupe de France title.

== Dates ==
Dates for the first two qualifying rounds, and any preliminaries required, were set by the individual Regional leagues. From round three, the FFF defined the calendar, with rounds up to and including the round of 32 being scheduled for weekends and later rounds up to, but not including, the final, taking place on midweek evenings. Due to the 2022 FIFA World Cup taking place in November and December, it was necessary to bring forward the eighth round by a week, compared to previous seasons, impacting the scheduling of earlier rounds. Similarly the timeline of rounds from the round of 64 onwards was compressed.

Round	Dates
Third round	11 September 2022
Fourth round	25 September 2022
Fifth round	9 October 2022
Sixth round	16 October 2022
Seventh round	30 October 2022
Eighth round	20 November 2022
Round of 64	8 January 2023
Round of 32	22 January 2023
Round of 16	8 February 2023
Quarter-finals	1 March 2023
Semi-finals	5 April 2023
Final	29 April 2023

== Teams ==
=== Round 1 to 6 ===
The first six rounds, and any preliminaries required, were organised by the Regional Leagues and the Overseas Departments/Territories, who allowed teams from within their league structure to enter at any point up to the third round. Teams from Championnat National 3 entered at the third round, those from Championnat National 2 entered at the fourth round and those from Championnat National entered at the fifth round.

The number of teams entering each qualifying round was as follows:

Region	Prelim	First	Second	Third	Fourth	Fifth
Nouvelle-Aquitaine		568	94	11	4	0
Pays de la Loire		442	41	31	3	2
Centre-Val de Loire		110	77	10	6	2
Corsica			6	23	1	1
Bourgogne-Franche-Comté		332	50	12	4	0
Grand Est		874	45	49	3	2
Méditerranée		174	27	6	6	1
Occitanie		372	106	8	3	0
Hauts-de-France		828	168	15	5	1
Normandy		320	54	11	3	1
Brittany		554	123	12	2	2
Paris IDF		368	92	12	8	3
Auvergne-Rhône-Alpes		768	102	35	7	3
Réunion				20	6	0
Mayotte	28	0	50	0	0	0
Guadeloupe			46	8	0	0
Martinique			52	6	0	0
French Guiana			14	25	0	0
Saint Pierre and Miquelon		2	1 (Note: winner entered into the Méditerranée draw)			
Total	28	5698	1148	297	61	18

=== Round 7 ===
The 145 qualifiers from the Regional Leagues were joined by the 10 qualifiers from the Overseas Territories and 20 2022–23 Ligue 2 teams. The qualifiers from Réunion, Martinique, Guadeloupe and French Guiana played off in internal matches.

==== Ligue 2 ====
- Amiens
- Annecy
- Bastia
- Bordeaux
- Caen
- Dijon
- Grenoble
- Guingamp
- Laval
- Le Havre
- Metz
- Nîmes
- Niort
- Quevilly-Rouen
- Paris FC
- Pau
- Rodez
- Saint-Étienne
- Sochaux
- Valenciennes

==== Regional Leagues ====
Nouvelle Aquitaine (13 teams)

- Angoulême Charente FC (4)
- Bergerac Périgord FC (4)
- Stade Bordelais (4)
- Trélissac-Antonne Périgord FC (4)
- SO Châtellerault (5)
- US Lège Cap Ferret (5)
- Stade Poitevin FC (5)
- FC Chauray (6)
- FC Lescar (6)
- FCE Mérignac Arlac (6)
- SA Mérignac (6)
- Entente Boé Bon-Encontre (7)
- AS Merpins (7)

Pays de la Loire (11 teams)

- SO Cholet (3)
- Le Mans FC (3)
- Voltigeurs de Châteaubriant (4)
- Les Herbiers VF (4)
- Sablé FC (5)
- NDC Angers (6)
- AC Basse-Goulaine (6)
- JSC Bellevue Nantes (6)
- AS La Châtaigneraie (6)
- Orvault SF (6)
- Mareuil SC (7)

Centre-Val de Loire (6 teams)

- LB Châteauroux (3)
- Bourges Foot 18 (4)
- Saint-Pryvé Saint-Hilaire FC (4)
- Vierzon FC (4)
- Avoine OCC (5)
- FC Saint-Doulchard (7)

Corsica (2 teams)

- FC Borgo (3)
- GC Lucciana (5)

Bourgogne-Franche-Comté (8 teams)

- ASM Belfort (4)
- Jura Sud Foot (4)
- Louhans-Cuiseaux FC (4)
- Union Cosnoise Sportive (5)
- FC Gueugnon (5)
- Jura Dolois Football (5)
- UF Mâconnais (5)
- ASC Saint-Apollinaire (5)

Grand Est (19 teams)

- AS Nancy Lorraine (3)
- SAS Épinal (4)
- FCSR Haguenau (4)
- AS Prix-lès-Mézières (5)
- US Raon-l'Étape (5)
- EF Reims Sainte-Anne (5)
- US Sarre-Union (5)
- ES Thaon (5)
- ES Gandrange (6)
- FC Geispolsheim 01 (6)
- AS Illzach Modenheim (6)
- SC Marnaval (6)
- US Reipertswiller (6)
- FC Saint-Louis Neuweg (6)
- FCO Strasbourg Koenigshoffen 06 (6)
- ES Villerupt-Thil (6)
- ES Heillecourt (7)
- SSEP Hombourg-Haut (7)
- COS Villers (7)

Méditerranée (5 teams)

- Aubagne FC (4)
- ÉFC Fréjus Saint-Raphaël (4)
- RC Grasse (4)
- Hyères FC (4)
- SC Toulon (4)

Occitanie (10 teams)

- Olympique Alès (4)
- RCO Agde (5)
- US Salinières Aigues Mortes (5)
- FC Alberes Argelès (5)
- US Colomiers Football (5)
- Onet-le-Château Football (5)
- FC Biars-Bretenoux (6)
- FU Narbonne (6)
- Union Saint-Estève Espoir
  Perpignan Méditerannée Métropole (6)
- Montauban FCTG (7)

Hauts-de-France (20 teams)

- USL Dunkerque (3)
- AS Beauvais Oise (4)
- FC Chambly Oise (4)
- Olympique Saint-Quentin (4)
- Wasquehal Football (4)
- Entente Feignies Aulnoye FC (5)
- Olympique Marcquois Football (5)
- Stade Béthunois (6)
- AC Cambrai (6)
- US Pays de Cassel (6)
- CS Chaumont-en-Vexin (6)
- US Escaudain (6)
- FC Loon-Plage (6)
- US Le Pays du Valois (6)
- Bondues FC (7)
- US Pont Sainte-Maxence (7)
- FC Liancourt-Clermont (8)
- JA Armentières (9)
- CA Éperlecques (9)
- US Téteghem (9)

Normandy (8 teams)

- US Avranches (3)
- Évreux FC 27 (4)
- US Granville (4)
- US Alençon (5)
- Grand-Quevilly FC (5)
- CMS Oissel (5)
- AF Virois (5)
- Le Havre Caucriauville Sportif (7)

Brittany (14 teams)

- US Concarneau (3)
- US Saint-Malo (4)
- Vannes OC (4)
- US Fougères (5)
- Lannion FC (5)
- Stade Plabennécois (5)
- AS Vitré (5)
- Auray FC (6)
- Espérance Chartres-de-Bretagne (6)
- PD Ergué-Gabéric (6)
- AG Plouvorn (6)
- Stade Pontivyen (6)
- US Grégorienne (7)
- Séné FC (7)

Paris-Île-de-France (10 teams)

- Paris 13 Atletico (3)
- Red Star F.C. (3)
- FC Fleury 91 (4)
- AS Poissy (4)
- FCM Aubervilliers (5)
- JA Drancy (5)
- CO Les Ulis (5)
- ESA Linas-Montlhéry (5)
- AC Paris 15 (7)
- Marcoussis Nozay La-Ville-du-Bois FC (9)

Auvergne-Rhône-Alpes (19 teams)

- Le Puy Foot 43 Auvergne (3)
- FC Villefranche Beaujolais (3)
- Andrézieux-Bouthéon FC (4)
- FC Chamalières (4)
- Lyon La Duchère (4)
- AS Saint-Priest (4)
- FC Bourgoin-Jallieu (5)
- Chambéry SF (5)
- US Feurs (5)
- FC Limonest Dardilly Saint-Didier (5)
- GFA Rumilly-Vallières (5)
- FC Vaulx-en-Velin (5)
- SA Thiers (6)
- Velay FC (6)
- Vénissieux FC (6)
- FC Cournon-d'Auvergne (7)
- FC Roche-Saint-Genest (7)
- AS Savigneux-Montbrison (7)
- ES Tarentaise (7)

==== Overseas teams ====
French Guiana: 2 teams

- ASU Grand Santi
- Le Geldar De Kourou

Réunion: 2 teams

- La Tamponnaise
- JS Saint-Pierroise

Martinique: 2 teams

- Golden Lion FC
- Aiglon du Lamentin FC

Guadeloupe: 2 teams

- L'Etoile de Morne-à-l'Eau
- SC Baie-Mahault

Mayotte: 1 team

- Diables Noirs

(French Polynesia) Tahiti: 1 team

- A.S. Vénus (Note: Winner of 2021–22 Tahiti Cup.)

New Caledonia: 1 team

- Hienghène Sport (Note: Winner of 2022 New Caledonia Cup.)

==== Mainland teams willing to travel overseas ====
The team from Tahiti played their seventh round tie at home. On 18 October 2022 the list of National, National 2 and National 3 clubs who had put themselves forward as candidates for overseas travel was published. Teams not selected were included in the draw for overseas travel in the eighth round, should they have qualified.

- US Avranches (3)
- FC Fleury 91 (4)
- Angoulême Charente FC (4)
- ASM Belfort (4)
- Évreux FC 27 (4)
- ASC Saint-Apollinaire (5)
- FCM Aubervilliers (5)
- CMS Oissel (5)
- Union Cosnoise Sportive (5)
- US Sarre-Union (5)
- CO Les Ulis (5)

=== Round 8 ===
The eighth round ties for mainland matches was made at the same time as the seventh round draw. Matches including the teams from Martinique and Guadeloupe were slotted into the draw where gaps appear due to teams being selected to travel overseas.

==== Prioritised order of mainland teams ====
The winners of the seventh round matches in Réunion and French Guiana played their eighth round match at home against teams from mainland France. A draw on 18 October 2022 prioritised the list of clubs for these fixtures, should they win their seventh round games. FCM Aubervilliers and Évreux FC 27 were the highest in the list to qualify for the eighth round.

1. CO Les Ulis (5)
2. FCM Aubervilliers (5)
3. FC Fleury 91 (4)
4. Évreux FC 27 (4)
5. ASC Saint-Apollinaire (5)
6. US Avranches (3)
7. Union Cosnoise Sportive (5)
8. US Sarre-Union (5)
9. Angoulême Charente FC (4)
10. CMS Oissel (5)

=== Round of 64 ===
The 44 qualifying teams from Round 8 were joined by the 20 2022–23 Ligue 1 teams. 32 ties were drawn in regional groups.

- Ajaccio
- Angers
- Auxerre
- Brest
- Clermont
- Lens
- Lille
- Lorient
- Lyon
- Marseille
- Monaco
- Montpellier
- Nantes
- Nice
- Paris Saint-Germain
- Reims
- Rennes
- Strasbourg
- Toulouse
- Troyes

=== Later rounds ===
Later rounds were open draws with no regional grouping.

== Seventh round ==
The draw for the seventh round took place in multiple stages:

- The seventh round in Guadeloupe, Martinique, French Guiana and Réunion will take place between the two qualifying teams from each territory, and were drawn and scheduled by the local league.
- The Overseas tie involving the team from Tahiti was drawn separately on 18 October 2022, against a team from the list of those willing to travel.
- Mainland teams were divided into ten groups, by geography and to ensure the groups are balanced in terms of the levels of the teams. The draw took place on 19 October 2022.

=== Overseas playoff ties ===
30 October 2022	JS Saint-Pierroise (Réunion)	0–0 (4–5 p)	(Réunion) La Tamponnaise	Saint-Pierre, Réunion
16:00 Réunion Time		Report		Stadium: Stade Michel Volnay

30 October 2022	Le Geldar De Kourou (French Guiana)	1–1 (4–5 p)	(French Guiana) ASU Grand Santi	Sinnamary, French Guiana
15:30 GFT	Charlot 75' (pen.)	Report	Kago 45+2' (pen.)	Stadium: Stade Omnisports

30 October 2022	L'Étoile de Morne-à-l'Eau (Guadeloupe)	1–1 (5–4 p)	(Guadeloupe) SC Baie-Mahault	Les Abymes, Guadeloupe
16:00 AST	Gamby 1'	Report	Raabon 11' (pen.)	Stadium: Stade René Serge Nabajoth

29 October 2022	Golden Lion FC (Martinique)	1–2	(Martinique) Aiglon du Lamentin FC	Le Lamentin, Martinique
15:30 AST	Catherine 89'	Report	Crifar 40'; Vitulin 88'	Stadium: Stade Georges Gratiant

=== Overseas teams hosting mainland teams ===
This tie was drawn on 18 October 2022, and was played on the weekend of 30 October 2022.

30 October 2022	A.S. Vénus (French Polynesia)	0–3	ASM Belfort (4)	Pirae, French Polynesia
14:30 TahitiTime		Report	Chapit 45', 90+2'; Cuenin 82'	Stadium: Stade Pater Te Hono Nui; Referee: Pierre Legat

=== Mainland ties ===
These ties were drawn on 19 October 2022, and were originally scheduled to be played on the weekend of 30 October 2022.

==== Group 7A ====
29 October 2022	FCE Mérignac Arlac (6)	0–1	Niort (2)	Mérignac
14:00 CEST		Report	Rocheteau 10'	Stadium: Stade Robert Brettes; Referee: Robin Chapapria

29 October 2022	FC Biars-Bretenoux (6)	1–2	Bergerac Périgord FC (4)	Biars-sur-Cère
19:00 CEST	Lozandier 16'	Report	Elissaly 35', 40'	Stadium: Stade Municipal; Referee: Julien Schmitt

29 October 2022	SO Châtellerault (5)	4–2	SA Mérignac (6)	Châtellerault
19:00 CEST	Zitouni 5'; Ramdane 39'; Vergerolle 64'; Touré 90' (pen.)	Report	Kouhous 34'; Insa 40'	Stadium: Stade de la Montée Rouge; Referee: Romain Rétif

29 October 2022	FC Chauray (6)	0–1	Avoine OCC (5)	Chauray
19:00 CEST		Report	Sakhi 88'	Stadium: Stade Municipal; Referee: Hugo Ducasse

28 October 2022	Stade Poitevin FC (5)	0–1	LB Châteauroux (3)	Buxerolles
19:30 CEST		Report	Ouaneh 9'	Stadium: Stade Michel-Amand; Referee: Soulaimane Chamel

30 October 2022	AS Merpins (7)	0–0 (3–5 p)	US Lège Cap Ferret (5)	Châteaubernard
14:00 CET		Report		Stadium: Stade Claude Boué; Referee: Robin Hingrand

28 October 2022	Angoulême Charente FC (4)	1–1 (3–4 p)	Trélissac-Antonne Périgord FC (4)	Angoulême
20:00 CEST	Leymonie 43'	Report	Gouache 7'	Stadium: Stade Camille-Lebon; Referee: Steven Llewellyn

29 October 2022	Stade Bordelais (4)	0–3	Bordeaux (2)	Le Bouscat
20:00 CEST		Report	Davitashvili 54'; Barbet 72'; Delaurier-Chaubet 84'	Stadium: Stade Sainte Germaine; Referee: Romain Delpech

==== Group 7B ====
30 October 2022	JA Armentières (9)	0–2	SC Marnaval (6)	Armentières
14:00 CET		Report	Gerard 39'; Delegue 90'	Stadium: Stade Leo Lagrange; Referee: Loann Darcy

29 October 2022	AS Prix-lès-Mézières (5)	0–0 (2–4 p)	Bastia (2)	Charleville-Mézières
16:00 CEST		Report		Stadium: Stade du Petit-Bois; Referee: Eddy Rosier

30 October 2022	FC Fleury 91 (4)	1–1 (2–3 p)	EF Reims Sainte-Anne (5)	Fleury-Mérogis
14:00 CET	Petrilli 57'	Report	Tacalfred 90'	Stadium: Stade Auguste Gentelet; Referee: Médéric Lacour

30 October 2022	Bondues FC (7)	0–2	Wasquehal Football (4)	Bondues
14:00 CET		Report	Bouzar 74'; Fallempin 90'	Stadium: Complexe Sportif du Fort; Referee: Clément Visbecq

30 October 2022	Olympique Marcquois Football (5)	3–1	AC Cambrai (6)	Marcq-en-Barœul
16:00 CET	Mammou 14', 35', 48'	Report	Becquelin 72'	Stadium: Stade Georges Nisquet; Referee: Henri Dutech Perez

29 October 2022	Olympique Saint-Quentin (4)	2–1	(New Caledonia) Hienghène Sport	Saint-Quentin
14:00 CEST	Cambrone 63'; Chambon 90+3'	Report	Dahité 40'	Stadium: Stade Paul Debrésie; Referee: Marc Michout

29 October 2022	Valenciennes (2)	1–1 (3–1 p)	Red Star F.C. (3)	Valenciennes
18:00 CEST	Zinga 53'	Report	Fall 78'	Stadium: Stade du Hainaut; Referee: Mickaël Leleu

30 October 2022	Entente Feignies Aulnoye FC (5)	2–1	US Escaudain (6)	Feignies
14:00 CET	Calderara 37'; Piedanna 90'	Report	A. Leghait 3'	Stadium: Complexe Sportif Didier Eloy; Referee: Valentin Cardon

==== Group 7C ====
29 October 2022	Chambéry SF (5)	1–1 (4–3 p)	FC Bourgoin-Jallieu (5)	Chambéry
17:00 CEST	Volic 47' (pen.)	Report	Gonzalez 39'	Stadium: Plaine de Jeux Mager; Referee: Alexandra Collin

30 October 2022	GFA Rumilly-Vallières (5)	3–0	FC Saint-Louis Neuweg (6)	Rumilly
14:30 CET	Ralph 1'; Behloul 31'; Poulain 90'	Report		Stadium: Stade des Grangettes; Referee: Alexis Guillon

29 October 2022	AS Illzach Modenheim (6)	1–4	Grenoble (2)	Illzach
15:00 CEST	Miliani 31'	Report	Phaëton 38'; Tell 42', 49', 66'	Stadium: Stade Joseph Biechlin; Referee: Geoffrey Kubler

1 November 2022 (Note: Game was not played on the weekend of the seventh round, due to the delay in the scheduling of the sixth round.)	ES Tarentaise (7)	0–5	FC Villefranche Beaujolais (3)	Salins-les-Thermes
14:00 CET		Report	Blanc 2'; Sergio 15', 58'; Bouchét 19'; Manseri 90'	Stadium: Stade Joseph Bardassier

29 October 2022	Annecy (2)	8–1	(Mayotte) Diables Noirs	Annecy
16:00 CEST	Kashi 10'; Pajot 25', 45', 65'; Sahi 34' (pen.), 71'; Bengueddoudj 84', 88'	Report	Fadhul 29'	Stadium: Parc des Sports; Referee: Azzedine Souifi

29 October 2022	AS Saint-Priest (4)	0–1	Lyon La Duchère (4)	Saint-Priest
18:00 CEST		Report	Oun 82'	Stadium: Stade Jacques Joly; Referee: Maxime Apruzzese

30 October 2022	Vénissieux FC (6)	0–2	FC Limonest Dardilly Saint-Didier (5)	Vénissieux
14:00 CET		Report	Benedick 9'; Kottoy 13'	Stadium: Stade Laurent Gérin; Referee: Timothé Bonnot

29 October 2022	Jura Sud Foot (4)	3–1	FC Vaulx-en-Velin (5)	Moirans-en-Montagne
18:00 CEST	Gaubey 22'; Tiago 65', 72'	Report	Nleme Oyono 28' (pen.)	Stadium: Stade Municipal; Referee: Maxim Plat

==== Group 7D ====
29 October 2022	FC Lescar (6)	0–2	Entente Boé Bon-Encontre (7)	Lescar
20:00 CEST		Report	Do Poco 73'; Martinez 88'	Stadium: Stade Bernard Masseillou; Referee: Hakim Mahaoudi

29 October 2022	SC Toulon (4)	1–1 (3–4 p)	Aubagne FC (4)	Toulon
16:00 CEST	Diallo 71'	Report	Dali-Amar 70'	Stadium: Stade de Bon Rencontre; Referee: Valentin Giorgetti

29 October 2022	Montauban FCTG (7)	2–2 (6–5 p)	Olympique Alès (4)	Montauban
18:00 CEST	Chaibi 31', 46'	Report	Abelinti 44' (pen.); Dengerma 90'	Stadium: Complexe Sportif Jean Verbeke; Referee: Aldric Chancioux

29 October 2022	Nîmes (2)	3–0	FC Borgo (3)	Nîmes
19:00 CEST	Koné 2'; Saïd 14'; Pagis 81'	Report		Stadium: Stade des Costières; Referee: Antoine Valnet

29 October 2022	US Salinières Aigues Mortes (5)	0–3	Pau (2)	Aigues-Mortes
15:00 CEST		Report	Saivet 24'; George 28'; Abzi 83'	Stadium: Stade du Bourgidou; Referee: Ahmed Taleb

30 October 2022	RCO Agde (5)	2–3	US Colomiers Football (5)	Agde
14:00 CET	Mazgouti 20'; Isola 58'	Report	Hattab 36'; Leoni 86'; Baptiste 90'	Stadium: Stade Louis Sanguin; Referee: Romain Zamo

30 October 2022	Hyères FC (4)	2–2 (4–2 p)	FC Alberes Argelès (5)	Hyères
15:00 CET	Diarra 17'; Baana Jaba 69'	Report	Gueye 15'; Mendy 20'	Stadium: Stade Perruc; Referee: Victor Pétigny

30 October 2022	Union Saint-Estève Espoir Perpignan Méditerannée Métropole (6)	3–1	FU Narbonne (6)	Saint-Estève
14:00 CET	Kanon 35', 48', 72'	Report	Bouyabene 43'	Stadium: Complexe Sportif des Aloes; Referee: Guillaume Janin

==== Group 7E ====
29 October 2022	Orvault SF (6)	1–1 (6–5 p)	Laval (2)	Orvault
15:00 CEST	Kersuzan 32'	Report	Durbant 84'	Stadium: Stade de Gagné; Referee: Léo Beulet

30 October 2022	Séné FC (7)	0–3	AS La Châtaigneraie (6)	Séné
15:00 CET		Report	Ndoye 19', 75'; Lescaille 58'	Stadium: Stade Alphonse Le Derf; Referee: Thomas Rocaboy

30 October 2022	AG Plouvorn (6)	0–0 (5–4 p)	Sablé FC (5)	Plouvorn
14:30 CET		Report		Stadium: Stade Guy de Réals; Referee: Louison Olivier

29 October 2022	Vannes OC (4)	1–1 (6–5 p)	US Concarneau (3)	Vannes
17:00 CEST	Ébrard 10'	Report	Gboho 13'	Stadium: Stade de la Rabine; Referee: Tifenn Leprodhomme

29 October 2022	Mareuil SC (7)	1–6	Les Herbiers VF (4)	Luçon
18:30 CEST	Moussion 60'	Report	Zobo 4', 77', 85'; Grellier 46'; Matondo 57' (pen.); Semedo 73'	Stadium: Stade Jean-de-Mouzon; Referee: Aurélien Grizon

29 October 2022	AS Vitré (5)	0–0 (3–5 p)	PD Ergué-Gabéric (6)	Vitré
17:00 CEST		Report		Stadium: Stade Municipal; Referee: Gaëtan Deneuve

30 October 2022	Auray FC (6)	0–2	Guingamp (2)	Vannes
14:00 CET		Report	Guillaume 11', 53'	Stadium: Stade de la Rabine; Referee: Pierre Retail

30 October 2022	JSC Bellevue Nantes (6)	2–0	AC Basse-Goulaine (6)	Nantes
14:00 CET	Nebti 15'; Keita 75'	Report		Stadium: Stade des Bernardières; Referee: Romain Bénéteau

29 October 2022	Stade Plabennécois (5)	1–0	SO Cholet (3)	Plabennec
17:00 CEST	Pellen 48'	Report		Stadium: Stade de Kervéguen; Referee: Kevin Barbin

29 October 2022	Voltigeurs de Châteaubriant (4)	1–1 (5–6 p)	Lannion FC (5)	Châteaubriant
18:00 CEST	Bangoura 74'	Report	Boisvilliers 90+2'	Stadium: Stade de la Ville en Bois; Referee: Yohan Gagnant

==== Group 7F ====
29 October 2022	NDC Angers (6)	2–4	US Granville (4)	Angers
18:00 CEST	Ougrirane 17' (pen.); Louvel 52'	Report	Kimmakon 22'; Sawadogo 48' (pen.); Assoumou 59'; Magassouba 70'	Stadium: Stade André Bertin; Referee: Paul Garo

29 October 2022	Évreux FC 27 (4)	1–0	Grand-Quevilly FC (5)	Évreux
18:00 CEST	Mendy 78'	Report		Stadium: Stade Mathieu Bodmer; Referee: Mohamed Awaisse Akbar

30 October 2022	Le Havre Caucriauville Sportif (7)	0–4	AF Virois (5)	Le Havre
14:30 CET		Report	Charlier 53', 56', 67'; Lamrabette 78'	Stadium: Stade Jules-Ladoumègue; Referee: Lukas Puzilewicz

29 October 2022	US Saint-Malo (4)	2–2 (3–4 p)	Caen (2)	Saint-Malo
18:00 CEST	Barroug 41' (pen.); Héry 90+4'	Report	Deminguet 65' (pen.); Mendy 84' (pen.)	Stadium: Stade de Marville; Referee: Gabriel Henry

29 October 2022	Espérance Chartres-de-Bretagne (6)	0–2	US Avranches (3)	Chartres-de-Bretagne
15:30 CEST		Report	Sacko 26' (pen.); Falouh 88'	Stadium: Stade Ensemble Rémy Béranger; Referee: Yann Flament

29 October 2022	US Fougères (5)	2–2 (8–7 p)	Le Mans FC (3)	Fougères
18:00 CEST	Martin 57', 84'	Report	J. Quarshie 20'; Gnanduillet 43'	Stadium: Stade Jean Manfredi Paron Nord; Referee: Félicien Gazon

29 October 2022	US Alençon (5)	3–3 (5–3 p)	Le Havre (2)	Alençon
18:00 CEST	Tessier 13', 42'; El Hamdaoui 62'	Report	Mahmoud 22'; Gomes 43'; Soumah 90+5'	Stadium: Stade Jacques Fould; Referee: Ludovic Genest

29 October 2022	US Grégorienne (7)	0–1	Stade Pontivyen (6)	Saint-Grégoire
18:00 CEST		Report	Le Gouellec 33'	Stadium: Stade Yves le Minoux; Referee: Elian Douart

==== Group 7G ====
29 October 2022	CMS Oissel (5)	1–1 (6–5 p)	AS Poissy (4)	Oissel
14:00 CEST	Mendy 17'	Report	Konaté 25' (pen.)	Stadium: Stade Marcel Billard; Referee: Charlie Sorel

30 October 2022	US Téteghem (9)	1–4	FC Loon-Plage (6)	Dunkirk
15:00 CET	Pietersoone 36'	Report	Dramé 13', 45'; Milliot 19'; Terrier 39'	Stadium: Stade Marcel-Tribut; Referee: Jean-Baptiste Esponde

29 October 2022	US Pays de Cassel (6)	2–1	CS Chaumont-en-Vexin (6)	Hazebrouck
19:00 CEST	Zmijak 75' (pen.); Bruneel 90+3'	Report		Stadium: Stade Auguste Damette; Referee: Bastien Lalbie

29 October 2022	GC Lucciana (5)	0–1	JA Drancy (5)	Lucciana
14:00 CEST		Report	Keita 45'	Stadium: Stade Charles Galletti; Referee: Simon Amzallag

29 October 2022	AS Beauvais Oise (4)	0–3	USL Dunkerque (3)	Beauvais
18:00 CEST		Report	Ba-Sy 62' (pen.), 65'; Ghrieb 86'	Stadium: Stade Pierre Brisson; Referee: Mehdi Mokhtari

29 October 2022	CA Éperlecques (9)	0–1	Stade Béthunois (6)	Saint-Omer
18:00 CEST		Report	Delsart 45'	Stadium: Stade Gaston Bonnet; Referee: Simon Préaux

29 October 2022	FCM Aubervilliers (5)	1–1 (4–1 p)	Quevilly-Rouen (2)	Aubervilliers
18:00 CEST	Konate 86'	Report	Bangré 51'	Stadium: Stade André Karman; Referee: Samir Zolota

30 October 2022	FC Chambly Oise (4)	1–1 (3–5 p)	Amiens (2)	Chambly
14:30 CET	Doremus 15'	Report	Fofana 43'	Stadium: Stade des Marais; Referee: Brendan Roffet

==== Group 7H ====
29 October 2022	Onet-le-Château Football (5)	2–1	US Feurs (5)	Onet-le-Château
18:00 CEST	Brunet 19', 83'	Report	Aulagnier 90'	Stadium: Stade de la Roque; Referee: Bastien Leray

29 October 2022	FC Cournon-d'Auvergne (7)	0–2	RC Grasse (4)	Cournon-d'Auvergne
18:00 CEST		Report	Corain 56'; Marin 87'	Stadium: Stade Joseph et Michel Gardet; Referee: Julien Rouquette

29 October 2022	FC Roche-Saint-Genest (7)	2–1	AS Savigneux-Montbrison (7)	Saint-Genest-Lerpt
18:00 CEST	Tourni 69'; Rubio 90+1'	Report	Jacquet 61' (pen.)	Stadium: Stade Étienne Berger; Referee: Andy Goncalves

29 October 2022	Saint-Étienne (2)	0–0 (3–4 p)	Rodez (2)	Saint-Étienne
15:00 CEST		Report		Stadium: Stade Geoffroy-Guichard; Referee: Faouzi Benchabane

29 October 2022	SA Thiers (6)	2–0	ÉFC Fréjus Saint-Raphaël (4)	Courpière
18:00 CEST	Chauve 45'; Huet 90'	Report		Stadium: Stade Joseph Gardette; Referee: Nicolas Houguet

28 October 2022	Le Puy Foot 43 Auvergne (3)	2–0	Andrézieux-Bouthéon FC (4)	Le Puy-en-Velay
20:00 CEST	Ben Fredj 3', 60'	Report		Stadium: Stade Charles Massot; Referee: Louis Lungeri

29 October 2022	FC Chamalières (4)	1–1 (6–5 p)	FC Gueugnon (5)	Chamalières
18:00 CEST	Mbina 85'	Report	Mustivar 69'	Stadium: Complexe Sportif Claude Wolff; Referee: Cédric Mouysset

29 October 2022	Velay FC (6)	2–3	UF Mâconnais (5)	Saint-Paulien
14:00 CEST	Ceccato 52'; Lourdin 82'	Report	Diagne 12'; Thoumin 55' (pen.); Farras 64'	Stadium: Stade Guy Roux; Referee: Tristan Theuillon

==== Group 7I ====
30 October 2022	US Pont Sainte-Maxence (7)	0–2	Vierzon FC (4)	Estrées-Saint-Denis
14:00 CET		Report	Ndiaye 10' (o.g.); Fabien 35'	Stadium: Stade des Charmilles; Referee: Philippe Lucas

30 October 2022	Marcoussis Nozay La-Ville-du-Bois FC (9)	3–2	US Le Pays du Valois (6)	Nozay
14:00 CET	Mehdi 27'; Kodad 31', 58' (pen.)	Report	Dosso 2'; Saounera 67'	Stadium: Stade du Moulin; Referee: Mathieu Delaloy

29 October 2022	Bourges Foot 18 (4)	0–0 (4–2 p)	ASC Saint-Apollinaire (5)	Bourges
18:00 CEST		Report		Stadium: Stade Jacques Rimbault; Referee: Brice Bayour

29 October 2022	Saint-Pryvé Saint-Hilaire FC (4)	1–1 (3–2 p)	Dijon (2)	Saint-Pryvé-Saint-Mesmin
16:00 CEST	Cherchour 62'	Report	Tchaouna 11'	Stadium: Stade du Grand Clos; Referee: Edgar Barenton

29 October 2022	FC Liancourt-Clermont (8)	0–5	Paris 13 Atletico (3)	Senlis
15:00 CEST		Report	Cissé 15'; Kaloukadilandi 34', 80'; Etonde 83'; Tiago Castro 84'	Stadium: Complexe Sportif; Referee: Julien Guéguen

30 October 2022	AC Paris 15 (7)	1–1 (2–4 p)	ESA Linas-Montlhéry (5)	Paris 13
14:00 CET	Hassani 82'	Report	Bouvil 24'	Stadium: Stade Boutroux; Referee: Florian Della Tomasina

29 October 2022	CO Les Ulis (5)	1–3	Paris FC (2)	Les Ulis
14:00 CEST	Lukasi 83' (pen.)	Report	Caddy 21', 56'; Gory 80' (pen.)	Stadium: Stade Jean-Marc Salinier; Referee: Arnaud Baert

30 October 2022	FC Saint-Doulchard (7)	1–3	Union Cosnoise Sportive (5)	Vierzon
14:00 CET	Dupuis 52'	Report	Grebert 8'; Kolazafy 13'; Lecomte-Soukhotine 88'	Stadium: Stade de Brouhot; Referee: Anthony Ustaritz

==== Group 7J ====
29 October 2022	US Sarre-Union (5)	0–3	ES Thaon (5)	Sarre-Union
18:00 CEST		Report	Comara 20'; Dufour 49'; Condi 78'	Stadium: Stade Omnisports; Referee: Alexis Gil

29 October 2022	Sochaux (2)	3–0	SSEP Hombourg-Haut (7)	Montbéliard (Note: Tie reversed from the original draw for security reasons.)
14:00 CEST	Doumbia 72' (pen.), 90'; Do Couto 79'	Report		Stadium: Stade Auguste Bonal; Referee: Thomas Vincent

29 October 2022	FC Geispolsheim 01 (6)	2–5	Louhans-Cuiseaux FC (4)	Geispolsheim
18:00 CEST	N'Toke 39'; Metz 86'	Report	Larose 23', 45'; Bègue 80' (pen.); Nseke 86'; Laspalles 88'	Stadium: Stade Municipal; Referee: Yann Gazagnes

30 October 2022	FCO Strasbourg Koenigshoffen 06 (6)	1–0	ES Gandrange (6)	Strasbourg
14:00 CET	Tine 70'	Report		Stadium: Stade Charles Frey; Referee: Dario De Quarti

1 November 2022 (Note: Match originally scheduled for 29 October 2022, but postponed by the FFF due to concerns over potential trouble between Metz and Nancy fans.)	US Raon-l'Étape (5)	1–2	Metz (2)	Raon-l'Étape
18:00 CET	Hassidou 71'	Report	Musaba 34'; Mikautadze 63'	Stadium: Stade Paul-Gasser; Referee: Romain Perpiñan

30 October 2022	ES Heillecourt (7)	0–4	SAS Épinal (4)	Dombasle-sur-Meurthe
14:00 CET		Report	Samba 37'; Robert 53' (o.g.); M'Madi 62'; Colin 73'	Stadium: Stade Pavageau; Referee: Julien Reynet

30 October 2022	ES Villerupt-Thil (6)	3–1	COS Villers (7)	Villerupt
14:00 CET	Glossoa 33'; Ali 49'; Yousfi 87'	Report	Vangrevelynghe 51'	Stadium: Stade Auguste Delaune; Referee: Christophe Tani

29 October 2022	US Reipertswiller (6)	3–2	AS Nancy Lorraine (3)	Reipertswiller
15:00 CEST	Schermann 21'; Klipfel 62'; Diebold 79'	Report	Giacomini 70'; Sakho 86'	Stadium: Stade de la Forêt; Referee: Tawbane Kani

29 October 2022	FCSR Haguenau (4)	1–0	Jura Dolois Football (5)	Haguenau
17:00 CEST	Fuss 37'	Report		Stadium: Parc des Sports; Referee: Renaud Potier

== Eighth round ==
The draw for the eighth round took place at the same time as the seventh round, with seventh round ties being paired together. Ties were originally scheduled to take place on the weekend of 18, 19 and 20 November 2022.

=== Group 8A ===
18 November 2022	Bergerac Périgord FC (4)	0–0 (4–5 p)	Niort (2)	Bergerac
20:00 CET		Report		Stadium: Stade de Campréal; Referee: Aurélien Petit

19 November 2022	SO Châtellerault (5)	0–1	Avoine OCC (5)	Châtellerault
19:00 CET		Report	Lemboma 8'	Stadium: Stade de la Montée Rouge; Referee: Soulaimane Chamel

19 November 2022	US Lège Cap Ferret (5)	1–4	LB Châteauroux (3)	Lège-Cap-Ferret
19:00 CET	Albert 40'	Report	Bianchini 10'; Ndour 33'; N'Goma 72'; Bozkurt 90'	Stadium: Stade Louis Goubet; Referee: Romain Delpech

19 November 2022	Trélissac-Antonne Périgord FC (4)	2–3	Bordeaux (2)	Périgueux
20:00 CET	Gouache 28'; Diakité 30'	Report	Barbet 62', 90+3'; Badji 63'	Stadium: Stade Francis-Rongiéras; Referee: Azzedine Souifi

=== Group 8B ===
19 November 2022	SC Marnaval (6)	0–3	Bastia (2)	Saint-Dizier
13:30 CET		Report	Schur 72'; Santelli 78'; Alfarela 90'	Stadium: Stade Charles Jacquin; Referee: Mickaël Leleu

11 January 2023	EF Reims Sainte-Anne (5)	0–0 (Note: The original match, on 20 November 2022 at Stade Robert Pirès in Cormontreuil, was abandoned after 65 minutes, with the score 3–0 at the time. A fight broke out on the pitch after a player from either side was sent off. Fans entered the field, and the coach of Wasquehal Football was knocked unconscious, requiring emergency services removing him to hospital. On 15 December 2022, the FFF announced that both Reims Sainte-Anne and Wasquehal were disqualified from the cup. After both clubs appealed to the CNOSF, that body ruled that the match should be replayed, which the FFF accepted, scheduling the game for 11 January 2023.) (2–4 p)	Wasquehal Football (4)	Clairefontaine-en-Yvelines
20:00 CET				Stadium: Stade Pierre Pibarot; Referee: Benjamin Lepaysant

20 November 2022	Olympique Marcquois Football (5)	0–1	Olympique Saint-Quentin (4)	Marcq-en-Barœul
15:00 CET		Report	Donat 21'	Stadium: Stade Georges Nisquet; Referee: Guy Grégory Prevot

19 November 2022	Entente Feignies Aulnoye FC (5)	0–3	Valenciennes (2)	Maubeuge
15:00 CET		Report	Nomel 11', 71'; Zinga 56'	Stadium: Stade Léo Lagrange; Referee: Rémi Landry

=== Group 8C ===
19 November 2022	Chambéry SF (5)	2–1	GFA Rumilly-Vallières (5)	Chambéry
17:00 CET	Albrecht 43'; Jacquet 55'	Report	De Col 5'	Stadium: Plaine de Jeux Mager; Referee: Louis Lungeri

19 November 2022	Grenoble (2)	2–0	FC Villefranche Beaujolais (3)	Grenoble
15:00 CET	Sbaï 25'; Ba 54'	Report		Stadium: Stade des Alpes; Referee: Alexandre Perreau Niel

18 November 2022	Lyon La Duchère (4)	2–3	Annecy (2)	Lyon
19:00 CET	Penneteau 67'; Gadacha 90'	Report	Sahi 1', 60'; Shamal 90'	Stadium: Stade de Balmont; Referee: Gaël Angoula

30 November 2022	Jura Sud Foot (4)	1–1 (Note: The initial match, at Parc des Sports Courtois Fillot in Limonest on 19 November 2022, was suspended in the 69th minute with the score at the time being 2–3, because of floodlight failure. After 30 minutes of unsuccessful attempts to fix the situation, the referee decided to abandon the match. On 24 November 2022 the FFF announced that the tie would be reversed and replayed on 30 November 2022.) (4–2 p)	FC Limonest Dardilly Saint-Didier (5)	Moirans-en-Montagne
20:00 CET	Wagué 14'	Report	Prault 43'	Stadium: Stade Municipal; Referee: Julien Schmitt

=== Group 8D ===
19 November 2022	Entente Boé Bon-Encontre (7)	1–4	Aubagne FC (4)	Boé
17:00 CET	Arion 31'	Report	Rivière 14'; Mendy 50'; Pirioua 75'; Soumah 85'	Stadium: Stade de Cancelles; Referee: Léo Beulet

19 November 2022	Montauban FCTG (7)	0–4	Nîmes (2)	Montauban
15:00 CET		Report	Pagis 9', 37'; Tchokounté 47'; Ómarsson 66'	Stadium: Stade Sapiac; Referee: Olivier Thual

19 November 2022	US Colomiers Football (5)	0–1	Pau (2)	Colomiers
18:00 CET		Report	Bassouamina 70'	Stadium: Complexe Sportif Capitany; Referee: Nicolas Rainville

20 November 2022	Union Saint-Estève Espoir Perpignan Méditerannée Métropole (6)	1–1 (2–4 p)	Hyères FC (4)	Perpignan (Note: The match was originally scheduled to take place at Complexe Sportif des Aloes in Saint-Estève, but this was successfully challenged by Hyères FC on the grounds that it wasn't the stadium usually used by the first team. The FFF rejected an appeal, and ordered Union Saint-Estève Espoir Perpignan Méditerannée Métropole to find an alternative stadium.)
14:30 CET	Faye 69'	Report	Barty 37'	Stadium: Stade Jean-Laffon; Referee: Jordane Lomi

=== Group 8E ===
19 November 2022	Orvault SF (6)	0–1	AS La Châtaigneraie (6)	Orvault
14:30 CET		Report	Melchior 88'	Stadium: Stade de Gagné; Referee: Paul Garo

20 November 2022	AG Plouvorn (6)	0–0 (3–4 p)	Vannes OC (4)	Plouvorn
14:00 CET		Report		Stadium: Stade Guy de Réals; Referee: Steven Llewellyn

19 November 2022	Les Herbiers VF (4)	2–2 (4–3 p)	Guingamp (2)	Les Herbiers
18:00 CET	Matondo 30'; Daury 66'	Report	Courtet 24'; Louiserre 37'	Stadium: Stade Massabielle; Referee: Mikaël Lesage

19 November 2022	PD Ergué-Gabéric (6)	1–2	Stade Plabennécois (5)	Ergué-Gabéric
18:00 CET	Le Reste 27'	Report	Kujabi 35'; Madec 77'	Stadium: Stade Lestonan; Referee: Tifenn Leprodhomme

20 November 2022	JSC Bellevue Nantes (6)	0–0 (6–7 p)	Lannion FC (5)	Nantes
13:30 CET		Report		Stadium: Stade des Bernardières; Referee: Thomas Vincent

=== Group 8F ===
19 November 2022	US Granville (4)	6–0	(Guadeloupe) L'Étoile de Morne-à-l'Eau	Granville
14:30 CET	Fombertasse 6'; Sawadogo 8', 60'; Nabab 15' (pen.), 82'; Diarra 43'	Report		Stadium: Stade Louis Dior; Referee: Maxime Jamet

19 November 2022	ASU Grand Santi (French Guiana)	0–3	Évreux FC 27 (4)	Remire-Montjoly
15:30 GFT		Report	I. Mendés 17'; Mendy 31'; D. Mendés	Stadium: Stade Municipal Dr. Edmard Lama; Referee: Guillaume Paradis

21 December 2022 (Note: The tie was originally scheduled for 19 November 2022, but the FFF postponed it after issues over the approval for use of a temporary stand. On 22 November, it was confirmed that the match would take place at Stade Pierre Compte, as was the plan for the original fixture, on 17 December 2022. However, the match was again postponed due to weather conditions and an unplayable pitch. On 19 December 2022, Caen announced that the tie would be played on 21 December 2022 in their stadium.)	AF Virois (5)	0–3 (Note: Although the match finished 3–0 to Caen, a challenge was lodged over the eligibility of substitute Dieudonné Gaucho Debohi, with the claim being that the player was under a suspension. The challenge was upheld by the FFF on 27 December 2022, meaning Caen were disqualified from the competition, and AF Virois qualified for the next round.)	Caen (2)	Caen
20:00 CET		Report	Essende 13'; A. Mendy 38'; Kyeremeh 85'	Stadium: Michel d'Ornano; Referee: Mickaël Leleu

19 November 2022	US Fougères (5)	0–1	US Avranches (3)	Fougères
18:00 CET		Report	Lemeray 71'	Stadium: Stade Jean Manfredi Paron Nord; Referee: Gabriel Henry

19 November 2022	US Alençon (5)	0–0 (3–4 p)	Stade Pontivyen (6)	Alençon
17:00 CET		Report		Stadium: Stade Jacques Fould; Referee: Nicolas Wassouf

=== Group 8G ===
19 November 2022	CMS Oissel (5)	1–1 (3–5 p)	FC Loon-Plage (6)	Oissel
14:00 CET	Mendy 90'	Report	Dramé 58'	Stadium: Stade Marcel Billard; Referee: Geoffrey Kubler

20 November 2022	US Pays de Cassel (6)	1–1 (3–2 p)	JA Drancy (5)	Hazebrouck
13:30 CET	Bruneel 22'	Report	Keita 34'	Stadium: Stade Auguste Damette; Referee: Julien Gueguen

19 November 2022	Stade Béthunois (6)	0–4	USL Dunkerque (3)	Béthune
18:00 CET		Report	Anziani 51'; Kondo 55', 85'; Bilingi 71'	Stadium: Stade Hermant-Deprez; Referee: Ali Djedid

20 November 2022	La Tamponnaise (Réunion)	1–0	FCM Aubervilliers (5)	Le Tampon, Réunion
15:00 Réunion Time	Nédélec 90+3'	Report		Stadium: Stade Klébert Picard; Referee: Abdelatif Kherradji

19 November 2022	Amiens (2)	10–0	(Martinique) Aiglon du Lamentin FC	Amiens
17:00 CET	Cissé 16', 24', 57'; Xantippe 23'; Kakuta 40', 53'; Bénet 49', 74'; Arokodare 65', 88'	Report		Stadium: Stade de la Licorne; Referee: Benjamin Lepaysant

=== Group 8H ===
19 November 2022	Onet-le-Château Football (5)	0–1	RC Grasse (4)	Onet-le-Château
18:00 CET		Report	Guèye 12'	Stadium: Stade de la Roque; Referee: Gaël Gratianne

19 November 2022	FC Roche-Saint-Genest (7)	0–1	Rodez (2)	Feurs
18:00 CET		Report	Rajot 38'	Stadium: Stade Maurice Rousson; Referee: Anthony Ustaritz

19 November 2022	SA Thiers (6)	2–3	Le Puy Foot 43 Auvergne (3)	Thiers
17:00 CET	Boche 69'; Jusserandot 77'	Report	Rivera 10'; Dadoune 64'; Ben Fredj 90+4'	Stadium: Stade Antonin-Chastel; Referee: Arnaud Baert

19 November 2022	FC Chamalières (4)	4–1	UF Mâconnais (5)	Chamalières
17:00 CET	Nsilu 55', 57'; Dibane 66'; Kapela 87'	Report	Thoumin 51'	Stadium: Complexe Sportif Claude Wolff; Referee: Samir Zolota

=== Group 8I ===
20 November 2022	Marcoussis Nozay La-Ville-du-Bois FC (9)	0–6	Vierzon FC (4)	Marcoussis
14:00 CET		Report	M'Vondo 14', 20'; Massombo 39'; N'Guessan 42'; Fabien 63'; Keita 78'	Stadium: Stade Pierre-Camou; Referee: Gaëtan Martin

19 November 2022	Bourges Foot 18 (4)	1–1 (3–1 p)	Saint-Pryvé Saint-Hilaire FC (4)	Bourges
18:00 CET	Sanson 78'	Report	Galas 55'	Stadium: Stade Jacques Rimbault; Referee: Ahmed Taleb

19 November 2022	ESA Linas-Montlhéry (5)	2–1	Paris 13 Atletico (3)	Montlhéry
13:30 CET	Leno 12' (pen.); Cisse 18'	Report	Tiago Castro 29'	Stadium: Stade Paul Desgouillons; Referee: Brendan Roffet

19 November 2022	Union Cosnoise Sportive (5)	0–2	Paris FC (2)	Cosne-Cours-sur-Loire
17:00 CET		Report	Guilavogui 5'; Gory 84'	Stadium: Stade Raphaël Giraux; Referee: William Toulliou

=== Group 8J ===
19 November 2022	ES Thaon (5)	2–2 (3–1 p)	Sochaux (2)	Thaon-les-Vosges
17:00 CET	Dufour 56'; Condi 86'	Report	Mauricio 21' (pen.), 84'	Stadium: Stade Robert Sayer; Referee: Romain Lissorgue

20 November 2022	FCO Strasbourg Koenigshoffen 06 (6)	2–1	Louhans-Cuiseaux FC (4)	Strasbourg
14:00 CET	Ibrahim Sidow 44'; Schall 64'	Report	Larose 75'	Stadium: Stade Charles Frey; Referee: Loïc L'Henoret

19 November 2022	SAS Épinal (4)	0–1	Metz (2)	Épinal
17:00 CET		Report	Joseph 87'	Stadium: Stade de la Colombière; Referee: Antoine Valnet

20 November 2022	ES Villerupt-Thil (6)	1–1 (2–0 p)	US Reipertswiller (6)	Villerupt
14:00 CET	Ali 26'	Report	Guillin 31'	Stadium: Stade Auguste Delaune; Referee: Romain Perpiñan

19 November 2022	FCSR Haguenau (4)	1–2	ASM Belfort (4)	Haguenau
16:00 CET	Hintenoch 29'	Report	Régnier 20'; Sissoko 70'	Stadium: Parc des Sports; Referee: Valentin Ougier

== Round of 64 ==
The draw was made on 21 November 2022, with the qualifying teams divided into four regional groups, and the 20 Ligue 1 teams divided equally amongst the groups. Ties were originally scheduled to take place on the weekend of 6, 7 and 8 January 2023.

=== Group A ===
8 January 2023	Jura Sud Foot (4)	1–2	Ajaccio (1)	Chassal-Molinges (Note: The tie was originally to be held at the Stade Municipal in Moirans-en-Montagne, but due to an unplayable pitch it was moved to Stade Édouard Guillon in Chassal-Molinges on 6 January 2023.)
15:30 CET	Wagué 90+1'	Report	Ruan Levine 45+2' (pen.), 63'	Stadium: Stade Édouard Guillon; Referee: Stéphanie Frappart

8 January 2023	Aubagne FC (4)	1–3	Chambéry SF (5)	Aubagne
18:00 CET	Djaballah 72'	Report	Volic 60'; Poujol 63'; Scarantino 83'	Stadium: Stade de Lattre-de-Tassigny; Referee: Romain Delpech

6 January 2023	Grenoble (2)	1–0	Nîmes (2)	Grenoble
18:00 CET	Sanyang 88'	Report		Stadium: Stade des Alpes; Referee: Alexandre Perreau Niel

7 January 2023	RC Grasse (4)	1–0	(Réunion) La Tamponnaise	Grasse
13:00 CET	Gazzaoui 14'	Report		Stadium: Stade de la Paoute; Referee: Gaël Angoula

6 January 2023	Pau (2)	2–1	Montpellier (1)	Bizanos
18:00 CET	Bassouamina 25'; George 82'	Report	Germain 70'	Stadium: Nouste Camp; Referee: Mathieu Vernice

7 January 2023	Monaco (1)	2–2 (4–5 p)	Rodez (2)	Monaco
18:00 CET	Akliouche 23'; Ben Yedder 37'	Report	Mendes 42'; Abdennour 80'	Stadium: Stade Louis II; Attendance: 1,000; Referee: Hakim Ben El Hadj
	Penalties
	Ben Yedder (penalty scored); Disasi (penalty scored); Ben Seghir (penalty scored); Caio Henrique (penalty scored); Golovin (penalty missed); Magassa (penalty missed)		(penalty scored) Abdennour; (penalty scored) Danger; (penalty missed) Corredor; (penalty scored) Senaya; (penalty scored) Depres; (penalty scored) Pembélé

7 January 2023	Le Puy Foot 43 Auvergne (3)	1–0	Nice (1)	Le Puy-en-Velay
18:00 CET	Ben Fredj	Report		Stadium: Stade Charles Massot; Attendance: 3,800; Referee: Clément Turpin

7 January 2023	Marseille (1)	2–0	Hyères FC (4)	Martigues (Note: The tie was reversed by the FFF on 9 December 2022, after Stade Mayol, the venue agreed by Hyères FC, was rejected. However, the game was scheduled for Stade France-Turcan in Martigues, rather than Marseille's home stadium.)
15:30 CET	Sánchez 45+1' (pen.); Dieng 70'	Report		Stadium: Stade France-Turcan; Attendance: 8,000; Referee: Jérémy Stinat

=== Group B ===
8 January 2023	Lannion FC (5)	1–7	Toulouse (1)	Guingamp
18:00 CET	Haug 36' (o.g.)	Report	Skyttä 12'; Begraoui 32'; Dallinga 39', 75'; Birmančević 57'; Boisvilliers 66' (o.g.); Spierings 81'	Stadium: Stade de Roudourou; Referee: Ruddy Buquet

7 January 2023	US Avranches (3)	0–2	Brest (1)	Avranches
15:30 CET		Report	Lees-Melou 73'; Camblan 90+3'	Stadium: Stade René Fenouillère; Referee: Eric Wattellier

7 January 2023	AF Virois (5)	0–2	Nantes (1)	Caen
18:00 CET		Report	Mohamed 29'; Guessand 55'	Stadium: Michel d'Ornano; Referee: Benoît Millot

8 January 2023	AS La Châtaigneraie (6)	0–6	Lorient (1)	La Roche-sur-Yon
15:30 CET		Report	Koné 43' (pen.); Cathline 45+2', 61'; Aouchiche 51'; Diarra 54'; Grbić 77'	Stadium: Stade Henri Desgrange; Referee: Marc Bollengier

8 January 2023	Stade Pontivyen (6)	1–4	Les Herbiers VF (4)	Pontivy
18:00 CET	Le Bigaut 87'	Report	Seydi 18'; Brélivet 24'; Lavenant 80', 90+3'	Stadium: Stade du Faubourg de Verdun; Referee: Mickaël Leleu

7 January 2023	Stade Plabennécois (5)	2–0	Vannes OC (4)	Plabennec
18:00 CET	Kujabi 30'; Madec 79'	Report		Stadium: Stade de Kervéguen; Referee: Benjamin Lepaysant

7 January 2023	US Granville (4)	0–3	Niort (2)	Granville
18:00 CET		Report	Olaitan 56', 69'; Merdji 77'	Stadium: Stade Louis Dior; Referee: Aurélien Petit

7 January 2023	Bordeaux (2)	1–2	Rennes (1)	Bordeaux
20:45 CET	Maja 45+2'	Report	Bourigeaud 23'; Doku 53'	Stadium: Matmut Atlantique; Attendance: 20,000; Referee: Pierre Gaillouste

=== Group C ===
8 January 2023	USL Dunkerque (3)	2–2 (4–5 p)	Auxerre (1)	Dunkirk
18:00 CET	Baghdadi 5'; Ipiélé 68'	Report	Raveloson 19', 35'	Stadium: Stade Marcel-Tribut; Attendance: 4,000; Referee: François Letexier
	Penalties
	Baghdadi (penalty scored); Bilingi (penalty scored); Ipiélé (penalty scored); Pierre (penalty missed); Ghrieb (penalty scored)		Niang (penalty scored); Jubal (penalty scored); Jeanvier (penalty scored); Perrin (penalty scored); Touré (penalty scored)

6 January 2023	Paris FC (2)	3–1	Valenciennes (2)	Paris
18:00 CET	Caddy 28' (pen.); Chahiri 49'; Guilavogui 69'	Report	Berthomier 16' (pen.)	Stadium: Stade Sébastien Charléty; Referee: Guillaume Paradis

8 January 2023	ASM Belfort (4)	3–1	Olympique Saint-Quentin (4)	Belfort
15:30 CET	Chapit 19'; Mazeghrane 45'; Sissoko 81'	Report	Fall 25'	Stadium: Stade Serzian; Referee: Rémi Landry

8 January 2023	FC Loon-Plage (6)	0–7	Reims (1)	Loon-Plage
15:30 CET		Report	Zeneli 45+3'; Sierhuis 54', 90'; Flips 69'; Adeline 77', 78'; Guitane 89'	Stadium: Stade Marcel Rosseel; Referee: Thomas Léonard

7 January 2023	ES Thaon (5)	0–0 (4–2 p)	Amiens (2)	Thaon-les-Vosges
18:00 CET		Report		Stadium: Stade Robert Sayer; Referee: Pierre Legat

7 January 2023	ESA Linas-Montlhéry (5)	0–2	Lens (1)	Bondoufle
15:30 CET		Report	Fofana 72'; Sotoca 77'	Stadium: Stade Robert Bobin; Attendance: 9,955; Referee: Mikael Lesage

14 January 2023	US Pays de Cassel (6)	1–1 (Note: US Pays de Cassel were drawn to meet either EF Reims Sainte-Anne or Wasquehal Football in the round of 64, but their eighth round match was abandoned after 65 minutes due to crowd trouble; as a result of the disqualification of both teams, Pays de Cassel were initially awarded bye to the round of 32. However, after both disqualified clubs appealed to the CNOSF, that body ruled that the eighth round match should be replayed, which the FFF accepted. US Pays de Cassel eventually faced the winners, Wasquehal Football, on 14 January 2023.) (5–4 p)	Wasquehal Football (4)	Hazebrouck
18:00 CET	Zmijak 90'	Report	Bouzar 83'	Stadium: Stade Auguste Damette; Referee: Mehdi Mokhtari

8 January 2023	Lille (1)	2–0	Troyes (1)	Villeneuve-d'Ascq
20:45 CET	David 15'; Bayo 68'	Report		Stadium: Stade Pierre-Mauroy; Attendance: 13,185; Referee: Jérôme Brisard

=== Group D ===
7 January 2023	FCO Strasbourg Koenigshoffen 06 (6)	0–0 (4–3 p)	Clermont (1)	Strasbourg
15:30 CET		Report		Stadium: Stade Émile-Stahl; Attendance: 2,700; Referee: Benoît Bastien
	Penalties
	Cherief (penalty scored); Mouakit (penalty scored); Tine (penalty missed); Ibrahim Sidow (penalty scored); Kekambus (penalty scored)		(penalty scored) Cham; (penalty missed) Allevinah; (penalty scored) Massolin; (penalty scored) Ogier; (penalty missed) Diallo

8 January 2023	Avoine OCC (5)	1–2	Vierzon FC (4)	Avoine
18:00 CET	Thonnel 20'	Report	Chamoueni 4'; Camara 62'	Stadium: Stade Marcel Vignaud; Referee: Arnaud Baert

7 January 2023	Évreux FC 27 (4)	1–1 (3–4 p)	Bastia (2)	Ménilles
13:00 CET	Mendes 16'	Report	Salles-Lamonge 90+2'	Stadium: Stade Pacy-Ménilles; Referee: Romain Lissorgue

6 January 2023	Strasbourg (1)	0–0 (4–5 p)	Angers (1)	Strasbourg
18:00 CET		Report		Stadium: Stade de la Meinau; Attendance: 10,323; Referee: Willy Delajod
	Penalties
	Diallo (penalty scored); Mothiba (penalty scored); Thomasson (penalty scored); Bellegarde (penalty missed); Diarra (penalty scored); Nyamsi (penalty missed)		(penalty scored) Abdelli; (penalty scored) Sima; (penalty scored) Mendy; (penalty scored) Salama; (penalty missed) Bentaleb; (penalty scored) Camara

7 January 2023	Lyon (1)	2–1	Metz (2)	Décines-Charpieu
15:30 CET	Barcola 60'; Candé 77' (o.g.)	Report	Jallow 63'	Stadium: Parc Olympique Lyonnais; Attendance: 29,763; Referee: Florent Batta

7 January 2023	ES Villerupt-Thil (6)	1–6	Annecy (2)	Amnéville
18:00 CET	Mannarino 19' (pen.)	Report	Pajot 7', 29'; Temanfo 16'; Mendy 23'; Rocchi 63'; Baldé 75'	Stadium: Stade André Valentin; Referee: Olivier Thual

8 January 2023	FC Chamalières (4)	0–0 (6–5 p)	Bourges Foot 18 (4)	Clermont-Ferrand
15:30 CET		Report		Stadium: Stade Gabriel Montpied; Referee: Mehdi Mokhtari

6 January 2023	LB Châteauroux (3)	1–3	Paris Saint-Germain (1)	Châteauroux
21:00 CET	Ntolla 37'	Report	Ekitike 13'; Soler 78'; Bernat 90+1'	Stadium: Stade Gaston-Petit; Attendance: 14,000; Referee: Bastien Dechepy

== Round of 32 ==
The draw was made on 8 January 2023. Ties took place between 20 and 23 January 2023.

20 January 2023	Marseille (1)	1–0	Rennes (1)	Marseille
21:10 CET	Guendouzi 59'	Report		Stadium: Stade Vélodrome; Attendance: 57,103; Referee: Stéphanie Frappart

21 January 2023	Chambéry SF (5)	0–3	Lyon (1)	Décines-Charpieu
15:30 CET		Report	Lacazette 11', 33', 67'	Stadium: OL Training Center; Attendance: 18,344; Referee: Gaël Angoula

21 January 2023	Stade Plabennécois (5)	0–1	Grenoble (2)	Plabennec
18:00 CET		Report	Sbaï 11'	Stadium: Stade de Kervéguen; Attendance: 2,500; Referee: Marc Bollengier

21 January 2023	FC Chamalières (4)	0–4	Paris FC (2)	Clermont-Ferrand
18:00 CET		Report	Caddy 40'; López 42'; Guilavogui 70'; Dabila 73'	Stadium: Stade Gabriel Montpied; Attendance: 3,535; Referee: Florent Batta

21 January 2023	Bastia (2)	1–1 (1–4 p)	Lorient (1)	Bastia
18:00 CET	Sainati 81'	Report	Koné 64'	Stadium: Stade Armand-Cesari; Attendance: 7,518; Referee: Eric Wattellier
	Penalties
	Magri (penalty scored); Djoco (penalty missed); Kaïboué (penalty missed)		(penalty scored) Boisgard; (penalty scored) Yongwa; (penalty scored) Le Bris; (penalty scored) Abergel

21 January 2023	Les Herbiers VF (4)	0–3	Reims (1)	Les Herbiers
18:00 CET		Report	Balogun 37' (pen.); Flips 64'; Adeline 87'	Stadium: Stade Massabielle; Attendance: 4,600; Referee: Mathieu Vernice

21 January 2023	RC Grasse (4)	0–0 (4–5 p)	Rodez (2)	Grasse
18:00 CET		Report		Stadium: Stade de la Paoute; Attendance: 2,000; Referee: Jérémy Stinat
	Penalties
	Gazzaoui (penalty scored); Guèye (penalty missed); Ako (penalty scored); Muratori (penalty scored); Souda (penalty missed); Châtelain (penalty scored); Medjian (penalty missed)		(penalty scored) Raux-Yao; (penalty missed) Vandenabeele; (penalty missed) Abdallah; (penalty scored) Danger; (penalty scored) Pembélé; (penalty scored) Younoussa; (penalty scored) Boissier

21 January 2023	Toulouse (1)	2–0	Ajaccio (1)	Toulouse
18:00 CET	Aboukhlal 66'; Ratão 69'	Report		Stadium: Stade Municipal; Attendance: 18,708; Referee: François Letexier

21 January 2023	FCO Strasbourg Koenigshoffen 06 (6)	0–1	Angers (1)	Strasbourg
20:45 CET		Report	Blažič 16'	Stadium: Stade de la Meinau; Attendance: 18,000; Referee: Jérémie Pignard

22 January 2023	Niort (2)	0–4	Auxerre (1)	Niort
18:30 CET		Report	Perrin 39', 67'; Da Costa 43'; Abline 64'	Stadium: Stade René Gaillard; Attendance: 2,429; Referee: Ruddy Buquet

22 January 2023	Lille (1)	2–0	Pau FC (2)	Villeneuve-d'Ascq
18:30 CET	Kouassi 37' (o.g.); Ang. Gomes 79'	Report		Stadium: Stade Pierre-Mauroy; Attendance: 12,451; Referee: Thomas Léonard

22 January 2023	ES Thaon (5)	0–0 (2–4 p)	Nantes (1)	Épinal
18:30 CET		Report		Stadium: Stade de la Colombière; Attendance: 5,500; Referee: Hakim Ben El Hadj
	Penalties
	Colin (penalty scored); Koriche (penalty scored); Gazagnes (penalty missed); Didierjean (penalty missed)		(penalty scored) Guessand; (penalty scored) Hadjam; (penalty scored) Girotto; (penalty missed) Ganago; (penalty scored) Mohamed

22 January 2023	Le Puy Foot 43 Auvergne (3)	0–0 (3–5 p)	Vierzon FC (4)	Espaly-Saint-Marcel
18:30 CET		Report		Stadium: Stade Charles Massot; Attendance: 2,008; Referee: Jérôme Brisard
	Penalties
	Ben Fredj (penalty scored); Meyer (penalty scored); M'Bemba (penalty missed); Sangaré (penalty scored)		(penalty scored) Fabien; (penalty scored) Khechim; (penalty scored) N'Guessan; (penalty scored) Koné; (penalty scored) Bandu

22 January 2023	ASM Belfort (4)	1–1 (3–4 p)	Annecy (2)	Belfort
18:30 CET	Sissoko 10'	Report	Baldé 56'	Stadium: Stade Roger-Serzian; Attendance: 2,300; Referee: Bastien Dechepy
	Penalties
	Régnier (penalty scored); Ramos (penalty missed); Sissoko (penalty scored); Berrabha (penalty scored); Cuenin (penalty missed)		(penalty scored) Kashi; (penalty missed) Billemaz; (penalty scored) Pajot; (penalty scored) Temanfo; (penalty scored) Bosetti

22 January 2023	Brest (1)	1–3	Lens (1)	Brest
21:00 CET	Slimani 19'	Report	Saïd 5'; Medina 30'; Thomasson 37'	Stadium: Stade Francis-Le Blé; Attendance: 7,000; Referee: Pierre Gaillouste

23 January 2023	US Pays de Cassel (6)	0–7	Paris Saint-Germain (1)	Lens
20:45 CET		Report	Mbappé 29', 34', 40', 56', 79'; Neymar 33'; Soler 64'	Stadium: Stade Bollaert-Delelis; Attendance: 38,000; Referee: Willy Delajod

== Round of 16 ==
The draw was made on 23 January 2023. The ties took place on 8 and 9 February 2023.

8 February 2023	Angers (1)	1–1 (2–4 p)	Nantes (1)	Angers
18:15 CET	Sima 6'	Report	Mollet 87'	Stadium: Stade Raymond Kopa; Attendance: 13,934; Referee: Benoît Bastien
	Penalties
	Salama (penalty missed); Ghoulam (penalty missed); Hunou (penalty scored); Thioub (penalty scored)		(penalty scored) Delort; (penalty scored) Mohamed; (penalty scored) Mollet; (penalty scored) João Victor

8 February 2023	Lyon (1)	2–2 (4–2 p)	Lille (1)	Décines-Charpieu
18:15 CET	Cherki 8'; Lacazette 21'	Report	David 29' (pen.); Zhegrova 64'	Stadium: Parc Olympique Lyonnais; Attendance: 24,779; Referee: Benoît Millot
	Penalties
	Tolisso (penalty scored); Dembélé (penalty scored); Caqueret (penalty scored); Lovren (penalty scored)		(penalty scored) Ang. Gomes; (penalty scored) Cabella; (penalty missed) Bayo; (penalty missed) Weah

8 February 2023	Toulouse (1)	3–1	Reims (1)	Toulouse
18:15 CET	Diouf 23' (o.g.); Aboukhlal 35'; Chaïbi 62'	Report	Cajuste 89'	Stadium: Stadium de Toulouse; Attendance: 17,660; Referee: Willy Delajod

8 February 2023	Auxerre (1)	2–3	Rodez (2)	Auxerre
18:15 CET	Niang 45+2'; Jubal 90+1'	Report	Mendes 3'; Corredor 68'; Park Jung-bin 76' (pen.)	Stadium: Stade de l'Abbé-Deschamps; Attendance: 5,322; Referee: Stéphanie Frappart

8 February 2023	Paris FC (2)	1–1 (5–6 p)	Annecy (2)	Paris
18:15 CET	Boutaïb 90+1'	Report	Farade 67' (pen.)	Stadium: Stade Sébastien Charléty; Attendance: 4,216; Referee: Pierre Gaillouste
	Penalties
	Boutaïb (penalty scored); Caddy (penalty scored); Kebbal (penalty missed); Phiri (penalty scored); Mandouki (penalty missed); Koré (penalty scored); Hanin (penalty scored); Chergui (penalty missed)		(penalty scored) Farade; (penalty scored) Mouanga; (penalty missed) Testud; (penalty scored) El Jaouhari; (penalty missed) Billemaz; (penalty scored) Jean; (penalty scored) Goncalves; (penalty scored) Temanfo

8 February 2023	Vierzon FC (4)	0–1	Grenoble (2)	Vierzon
18:15 CET		Report	Nestor 53'	Stadium: Stade de Brouhot; Attendance: 1,863; Referee: Ruddy Buquet

8 February 2023	Marseille (1)	2–1	Paris Saint-Germain (1)	Marseille
21:10 CET	Sánchez 31' (pen.); Malinovskyi 57'	Report	Ramos 45+2'	Stadium: Stade Vélodrome; Attendance: 65,329; Referee: François Letexier

9 February 2023	Lorient (1)	1–1 (2–4 p)	Lens (1)	Lorient
21:00 CET	Le Fée 84'	Report	Fulgini 21'	Stadium: Stade du Moustoir; Attendance: 14,835; Referee: Jérémie Pignard
	Penalties
	Le Fée (penalty missed); Talbi (penalty scored); Doucouré (penalty scored); Koné (penalty missed)		(penalty scored) Frankowski; (penalty scored) Sotoca; (penalty scored) Thomasson; (penalty scored) Medina

== Quarter-finals ==
The draw was made on 9 February 2023.

28 February 2023	Lyon (1)	2–1	Grenoble (2)	Décines-Charpieu
21:10 CET	Barcola 24'; Jeffinho 38'	Report	Sbaï 74'	Stadium: Parc Olympique Lyonnais; Attendance: 34,017; Referee: Stéphanie Frappart

1 March 2023	Nantes (1)	2–1	Lens (1)	Nantes
18:15 CET	Delort 31' (pen.), 59' (pen.)	Report	Fofana 28'	Stadium: Stade de la Beaujoire; Attendance: 0 Referee: Clément Turpin

1 March 2023	Toulouse (1)	6–1	Rodez (2)	Toulouse
18:45 CET	Aboukhlal 5'; Van den Boomen 7'; Dallinga 10', 51' (pen.); Chaïbi 21'; Suazo 38'	Report	Younoussa 69'	Stadium: Stadium de Toulouse; Attendance: 30,480; Referee: Jérémie Pignard

1 March 2023	Marseille (1)	2–2 (6–7 p)	Annecy (2)	Marseille
21:00 CET	Veretout 29'; Mughe 90+6'	Report	Sahi 53'; Mouanga 59'	Stadium: Stade Vélodrome; Attendance: 63,929; Referee: Benoît Bastien
	Penalties
	Guendouzi (penalty scored); Sánchez (penalty scored); Tavares (penalty missed); Clauss (penalty scored); Ounahi (penalty scored); Vitinha (penalty scored); Rongier (penalty scored); Balerdi (penalty missed)		(penalty missed) Kashi; (penalty scored) Demoncy; (penalty scored) Mouanga; (penalty scored) Baldé; (penalty scored) Jean; (penalty scored) El Jaouhari; (penalty scored) Shamal; (penalty scored) Lajugie

== Semi-finals ==
The draw was made on 2 March 2023.

5 April 2023	Nantes (1)	1–0	Lyon (1)	Nantes
21:10 CEST	Blas 57'	Report		Stadium: Stade de la Beaujoire; Attendance: 34,687; Referee: Bastien Dechepy

6 April 2023	Annecy (2)	1–2	Toulouse (1)	Annecy
20:45 CEST	Bosetti 51' (pen.)	Report	Aboukhlal 36'; Chaïbi 85'	Stadium: Parc des Sports; Attendance: 13,620; Referee: Jérémy Stinat

== Final ==
29 April 2023
21:00 CEST

Nantes	1–5	Toulouse
Blas 75' (pen.)	Report	Costa 4', 10'; Dallinga 23', 31'; Aboukhlal 79'

Stade de France, Saint-Denis
Attendance: 78,038
Referee: Benoît Millot

== Top scorers ==
Rank	Player	Club	Goals
1	(Netherlands) Thijs Dallinga	Toulouse	6
2	(France) Kylian Mbappé	Paris Saint-Germain	5
2	(France) Vincent Pajot	Annecy	5
2	(Ivory Coast) Moïse Sahi	Annecy	5
2	(Morocco) Zakaria Aboukhlal	Toulouse	5
6	(France) Alexandre Lacazette	Lyon	4
