= 2022–23 Championnat National 2 =

Championnat National 2
- Season: 2022–23
- Dates: 20 August 2022 – 3 June 2023
- Champions: Marignane GCB
- Promoted: Rouen; Épinal; Marignane GCB; GOAL FC
- Relegated: 22 teams (See Season outcomes section)
- Top goalscorer: 24 Dame Guèye, Grasse; Arnold Lamb Luth, Racing Club
- Biggest home win: Hyères 11–1 Sète; Group C, Game week 26, 29 April 2023
- Biggest away win: SM Caen (res) 0–5 Vannes; Group A, Game week 1, 20 August 2022; Évreux 0–5 Racing Club; Group A, Game week 6, 1 October 2022; Vannes 0–5 Racing Club; Group A, Game week 19, 25 February 2023; Guingamp (res) 1–6 Chambly; Group A, Game week 27, 6 May 2023
- Highest scoring: Hyères 11–1 Sète; Group C, Game week 26, 29 April 2023

The 2022–23 Championnat National 2 was the 25th season of the fourth tier in the French football league system in its current format. This season the competition was contested by 64 clubs split geographically across four groups of 16 teams. The teams included amateur clubs (although a few are semi-professional) and the reserve teams of professional clubs. The competition started on 20 August 2022 and completed on 3 June 2023.

== Teams ==
On 13 July 2022, the FFF ratified the constitution of the competition, and published the groups.

Changes from the 2021-22 season were:

Teams joining the division

- Chambly, Boulogne and Créteil finished in the relegation positions in 2021-22 Championnat National.
- Sète were relegated from 2021-22 Championnat National by the Direction Nationale du Contrôle de Gestion for financial mismanagement.
- Stade Bordelais, Saumur, Vierzon, Furiani-Agliani, Racing Besançon, Colmar, Alès, Wasquehal, Évreux, Rennes (res), Racing Club and Thonon Évian finished in the promotion places in 2021–22 Championnat National 3

Teams leaving the division

- Versailles, Martigues, Paris 13 Atletico and Le Puy were champions of each group, and were promoted to 2022–23 Championnat National
- Plabennec, Vitré, Schiltigheim, Lens (res), Entente SSG, Monaco (res), Rumilly-Vallières, Marseille (res), Montpellier (res), Colomiers and Mont-de-Marsan finished in the relegation positions in 2021–22 Championnat National 2 and were relegated to 2022–23 Championnat National 3
- Béziers were relegated to 2022-23 Championnat National 3 by the DNCG for financial mismanagement.

== Promotion and Relegation ==
The top team in each group were promoted to 2023–24 Championnat National.

Due to the restructuring of the French football leagues, this season the bottom five teams in each group were relegated to 2023–24 Championnat National 3, along with the two worst performing eleventh-placed teams. This performance was calculated based on the performance of each eleventh-placed team in matches against the teams finishing 6th to 10th.

== League tables ==
=== Group A ===
Pos	Team	Pld	W	D	L	GF	GA	GD	Pts	Promotion or relegation
1	Rouen (P)	30	21	6	3	58	29	+29	69	Promotion to National
2	Racing Club	30	17	8	5	66	29	+37	59	
3	Chambly	30	16	9	5	52	25	+27	57	
4	Châteaubriant	30	13	9	8	33	29	+4	48	
5	Saint-Malo	30	11	10	9	41	37	+4	43	
6	Poissy (Note: As a result of a challenge lodged by Rouen after their 2–0 defeat at Poissy on 10 September 2022, the match was awarded to Rouen by the FFF on 21 December 2022, with a 0–3 scoreline, and Poissy were deducted a penalty point. This was due to invalid health certificates for two players. The FFF deducted an additional three points, one each for the other three games the players had participated in. At the end of the season, Poissy were excluded from National competition by the DNCG.) (D, R)	30	13	6	11	43	43	0	41	Administrative relegation to Régional 1
7	Beauvais	30	9	12	9	41	37	+4	39 (Note: Head to head, Beauvais vs Blois vs Saint-Pryvé. Beauvais 7 points, Blois 5 points, Saint-Pryvé 4 points.)	
8	Blois	30	10	9	11	46	42	+4	39	
9	Saint-Pryvé	30	10	9	11	28	33	−5	39	
10	Granville	30	9	10	11	42	47	−5	37 (Note: Head to head, Granville vs Guingamp (res). Granville 6 points, Guingamp (res) 0 points.)	
11	Guingamp (res)	30	10	7	13	37	48	−11	37	
12	Évreux (Note: On 6 December 2022, the DNCG announced a three point deduction for Évreux and a five point deduction for Chartres as a result of financial mismanagement.) (D, R)	30	8	10	12	47	59	−12	31	Administrative relegation to Régional 1
13	Rennes (res) (R)	30	7	7	16	43	63	−20	28	Relegation to National 3
14	Vannes (R)	30	5	9	16	47	58	−11	24 (Note: Head to head, Vannes vs SM Caen (res). Vannes 6 points, SM Caen (res) 0 points.)	Relegation to National 3
15	SM Caen (res) (R)	30	5	9	16	37	62	−25	24	Relegation to National 3
16	Chartres (Note: On 6 December 2022, the DNCG announced a three point deduction for Évreux and a five point deduction for Chartres as a result of financial mismanagement. In addition to their sportive relegation to National 3, Chartres was administratively relegated to Régional 1 by the DNCG.) (D, R)	30	6	10	14	33	53	−20	23	Administrative relegation to Régional 1

Source: Soccerway
Rules for classification: 1) points; 2) head-to-head results; 3) head-to-head goal difference; 4) goal difference; 5) number of goals scored; 6) fair play points; 7) draw
(D) Disqualified; (P) Promoted; (R) Relegated

=== Group B ===
Pos	Team	Pld	W	D	L	GF	GA	GD	Pts	Promotion or relegation
1	Épinal (P)	30	17	7	6	55	34	+21	58 (Note: Head to head, Épinal vs Fleury. Épinal 4 points, Fluery 1 point.)	Promotion to National
2	Fleury	30	17	7	6	47	31	+16	58	
3	FC 93 (Note: On 10 January 2023, the DNCG announced a deduction of 3 points for FC 93 as a result of financial mismanagement.)	30	17	4	9	59	36	+23	52	
4	Furiani-Agliani	30	13	9	8	36	25	+11	48	
5	Créteil	30	11	10	9	39	31	+8	43 (Note: Head to head, Créteil vs Racing Besançon vs Colmar. Créteil 7 points, Racing Besançon 5 points, Colmar 4 points.)	
6	Racing Besançon	30	11	10	9	32	31	+1	43	
7	Colmar	30	12	7	11	35	37	−2	43	
8	Haguenau	30	11	7	12	36	44	−8	40	
9	Boulogne	30	11	6	13	34	33	+1	39	
10	Wasquehal (Note: On 22 November 2022, the DNCG announced a deduction of 3 points for Wasquehal as a result of financial mismanagement.)	30	13	2	15	49	57	−8	38 (Note: Head to head, Wasquehal vs Saint-Quentin. Wasquehal 6 points, Saint-Quentin 0 points.)	
11	Saint-Quentin	30	11	5	14	33	44	−11	38	
12	Saint-Maur (R)	30	8	11	11	31	39	−8	35	Relegation to National 3
13	Belfort (R)	30	8	10	12	31	33	−2	34	Relegation to National 3
14	Metz (res) (R)	30	9	4	17	39	53	−14	31 (Note: Head to head, Metz (res) vs Sainte-Geneviève. Metz (res) 3 points, +2 Goal Difference, Sainte-Geneviève 3 points, -2 Goal Difference.)	Relegation to National 3
15	Sainte-Geneviève (Note: On 1 June 2023, the FFF announced a deduction of 4 points for Sainte-Geneviève as a result of the incident that happened on 25 March 2023 during the game against Boulogne.) (R)	30	10	5	15	32	40	−8	31	Relegation to National 3
16	Reims (res) (R)	30	4	10	16	29	49	−20	22	Relegation to National 3

Source: Soccerway
Rules for classification: 1) points; 2) head-to-head results; 3) head-to-head goal difference; 4) goal difference; 5) number of goals scored; 6) fair play points; 7) draw
(P) Promoted; (R) Relegated

=== Group C ===
Pos	Team	Pld	W	D	L	GF	GA	GD	Pts	Promotion or relegation
1	Marignane GCB (P)	30	16	8	6	37	23	+14	56	Promotion to National
2	Jura Sud Foot	30	15	7	8	45	34	+11	52	
3	Grasse	30	14	9	7	49	33	+16	51 (Note: Head to head, Grasse vs Thonon Évian vs Lyon La Duchère. Grasse 10 points, Thonon Évian 4 points, Lyon La Duchère 3 points.)	
4	Thonon Évian	30	15	6	9	41	28	+13	51	
5	Lyon La Duchère (D, R)	30	15	6	9	46	33	+13	51	Administrative relegation to National 3
6	Fréjus Saint-Raphaël (Note: The match between Alès and Fréjus Saint-Raphaël, on 13 May 2023, was abandoned before the hour mark after technical problems caused one of the floodlight pylons to fail. Fréjus Saint-Raphaël were leading 1–0 at the time. The result stands until investigated by the 'FFF'. The game was replayed on 20 May 2023.)	30	11	12	7	32	25	+7	45	
7	Hyères	30	11	9	10	40	33	+7	42	
8	Auxerre (res)	30	10	11	9	37	30	+7	41	
9	Toulon	30	11	5	14	38	41	−3	38 (Note: Head to head, Toulon vs Alès. Toulon 4 points, Alès 1 point.)	
10	Alès (Note: On 6 December 2022, the DNCG announced a five point deduction for Alès as a result of financial mismanagement. The match between Alès and Fréjus Saint-Raphaël, on 13 May 2023, was abandoned before the hour mark after technical problems caused one of the floodlight pylons to fail. Fréjus Saint-Raphaël were leading 1–0 at the time. The result stands until investigated by the 'FFF'. The game was replayed on 20 May 2023.)	30	11	10	9	41	36	+5	38	
11	Aubagne	30	9	10	11	39	46	−7	37	
12	Louhans-Cuiseaux (R)	30	9	9	12	45	47	−2	36	Relegation to National 3
13	Canet Roussillon (Note: On 15 November 2022, the DNCG announced a deduction of 3 points for Canet Roussillon as a result of financial mismanagement.) (R)	30	10	8	12	26	28	−2	35	Relegation to National 3
14	Lyon (res) (R)	30	8	8	14	36	45	−9	32	Relegation to National 3
15	Saint-Priest (R)	30	6	11	13	38	45	−7	29	Relegation to National 3
16	Sète (D, R)	30	3	3	24	23	86	−63	12	Administrative relegation to National 3

Source: Soccerway
Rules for classification: 1) points; 2) head-to-head results; 3) head-to-head goal difference; 4) goal difference; 5) number of goals scored; 6) fair play points; 7) draw
(D) Disqualified; (P) Promoted; (R) Relegated

=== Group D ===
Pos	Team	Pld	W	D	L	GF	GA	GD	Pts	Promotion or relegation
1	GOAL FC (P)	30	15	9	6	44	25	+19	54	Promotion to National
2	Les Herbiers	30	14	10	6	54	35	+19	52	
3	Bergerac	30	13	11	6	48	30	+18	50	
4	Angoulême	30	12	9	9	28	19	+9	45 (Note: Head to head, Angoulême vs Trélissac. Angoulême 3 points, 0 Goal Difference, Trélissac 3 points, 0 Goal Difference. Head to head resolved via overall Goal Difference.)	
5	Trélissac	30	12	9	9	33	28	+5	45	
6	Chamalières	30	12	8	10	36	30	+6	44	
7	Romorantin	30	12	7	11	40	40	0	43	
8	Bourges Foot 18	30	10	11	9	32	35	−3	41 (Note: Head to head, Bourges Foot 18 vs Saumur vs Angers (res). Bourges Foot 18 8 points, Saumur 4 points, Angers (res) 2 points.)	
9	Saumur	30	10	11	9	36	35	+1	41	
10	Angers (res)	30	12	5	13	37	44	−7	41	
11	Andrézieux	30	9	13	8	29	27	+2	40	
12	Lorient (res)	30	9	12	9	39	33	+6	39	
13	Nantes (res) (R)	30	8	10	12	31	41	−10	34	Relegation to National 3
14	Stade Bordelais (R)	30	8	5	17	32	48	−16	29	Relegation to National 3
15	Moulins Yzeure (R)	30	6	9	15	26	44	−18	27	Relegation to National 3
16	Vierzon (R)	30	6	5	19	22	53	−31	23	Relegation to National 3

Source: Soccerway
Rules for classification: 1) points; 2) head-to-head results; 3) head-to-head goal difference; 4) goal difference; 5) number of goals scored; 6) fair play points; 7) draw
(P) Promoted; (R) Relegated

== Top scorers ==
As of end of the season.

Rank	Player	Club	Goals
1	(Senegal) Dame Guèye	Grasse	24
2	(France) Arnold Lamb Luth	Racing Club	22
2	(France) Christopher Ibayi	Rouen	22
2	(France) Farid Beziouen	FC 93	22
5	(France) Cheikh Touré	Poissy	21
6	(France) Alexi Ébrard	Vannes	18
6	(France) Jordan Popineau	Blois	18
8	(Guinea) Ousmane Camara	Auxerre (res)	17
8	(Gabon) Orphé Mbina	Chamalières	17
10	(France) Hugo Chambon	Saint-Quentin	16
10	(France) Isaac Matondo	Les Herbiers	16

== Season outcomes ==
=== Promotion ===
Rouen, Épinal, Marignane GCB, GOAL FC were champions of each group, and were promoted to 2023–24 Championnat National, subject to the usual ratification by the FFF and DNCG.

=== Relegations ===
A total of 22 clubs were relegated to 2023–24 Championnat National 3. Reprieves are required to maintain this number in light of any administrative relegations enacted by the FFF and DNCG.

Évreux, Rennes (res), Vannes, SM Caen (res), Chartres, Reims (res), Sainte-Geneviève, Metz (res), Belfort, Saint-Maur, Sète, Saint-Priest, Lyon (res), Canet Roussillon, Louhans-Cuiseaux, Vierzon, Moulins Yzeure, Stade Bordelais, Nantes (res) and Lorient (res) finished in places 12 to 16 in their groups.

The two eleventh placed teams with the worst record against teams in sixth to tenth place in their groups are also relegated:

Ranking of eleventh placed teams.

Pos	Team	Pts	
1	Andrézieux	12	Maintain in National 2
2	Guingamp (res)	9	Maintain in National 2
3	Aubagne	8	Reprieved
4	Saint-Quentin	7	Reprieved

=== Reprieves ===
The following reprieves took place.

- Aubagne were reprieved, due to the administrative relegation of Lyon La Duchère by the DNCG, with Lyon La Duchère indicating they are not appealing the decision.
- Saint-Quentin were reprieved, due to the expulsion from the national competition of Poissy by the DNCG, which was confirmed on appeal.

Any reprieves required beyond the two eleventh-placed clubs were taken from the twelfth-placed clubs with the best record, excluding Évreux due to their expulsion from the national competition by the DNCG.

Ranking of twelfth placed teams.

Pos	Team	Pts	
1	Lorient (res)	20	Reprieved
2	Saint-Maur	13	Relegated
3	Louhans-Cuiseaux	12	Relegated

- Lorient (res) were reprieved due to the exclusion of Sedan from the national competition.
