= 2021–22 Championnat National 3 =

Championnat National 3
- Season: 2021–22
- Dates: 28 August 2021 – 12 June 2022
- Promoted: 8 teams (see season outcomes)
- Relegated: 36 teams (see season outcomes)
- Top goalscorer: 22 (Ilyes Chaïbi, Thonon Evian)
- Biggest home win: Grandvillars 9–0 Valdahon-Vercel; Group E, Game week 16, 4 June 2022
- Biggest away win: Endoume Marseille 2–12 Rousset; Group D, Game week 30, 4 June 2022
- Highest scoring: Endoume Marseille 2–12 Rousset; Group D, Game week 30, 4 June 2022

The 2021–22 Championnat National 3 was the fifth season of the fifth tier in the French football league system in its current format. The competition was normally contested by 168 clubs split geographically across 12 groups of 14 teams, but this season had 169 clubs due to the administrative relegation of Gazélec Ajaccio. The teams included amateur clubs (although a few were semi-professional) and the reserve teams of professional clubs.

== Teams ==
On 15 July 2021, the FFF ratified the constitution of the competition, and published the groups.

Due to the non-completion of the 2020–21 season, the FFF declared that there would be no regular promotion or relegation from the division, and that any vacancies to be filled would be done on the basis of finishing positions in the 2019–20 season.

Changes from 2020–21 season were as follows, affecting groups C, D, H and K:

- The reserve team of the newly formed Bourges Foot 18 were placed in Group C.
- Tours were administratively relegated from Group C for financial reasons, which was confirmed on appeal.
- Gazélec Ajaccio were administratively relegated from Championnat National 2 for financial reasons, a decision which was confirmed on appeal, and were placed in Group D. The group will have 15 teams this season.
- Vitré and Montpellier (res) were promoted to fill vacancies in Championnat National 2 as best 14th placed teams in the 2019–20 season. They were replaced by Trégunc and Aigues-Mortes

== Promotion and relegation ==
If eligible, the top team in each group is promoted to Championnat National 2. If a team finishing top of the group is ineligible, or declines promotion, the next eligible team in that group is promoted.

Generally, three teams are relegated from each group to their respective top regional league, subject to reprieves. Extra teams are relegated from a group if more than one team is relegated to that group from Championnat National 2. In the case that no teams are relegated to a group from Championnat National 2, one less team is relegated from that group to the regional league.

Reserve teams whose training centres are categorised as category 2B or lower cannot be promoted to Championnat National 2 by the rules of the competition.

== League tables ==
=== Group A: Nouvelle-Aquitaine ===
Pos	Team	Pld	W	D	L	GF	GA	GD	Pts	Promotion or relegation
1	Stade Bordelais (P)	26	19	5	2	57	28	+29	62	Promotion to National 2
2	Bayonne	26	14	5	7	45	36	+9	47	
3	Anglet	26	13	6	7	37	27	+10	45	
4	Bordeaux (res)	26	13	3	10	41	30	+11	42	
5	Poitiers	26	11	8	7	52	33	+19	41	
6	Chauvigny	26	11	5	10	36	31	+5	38	
7	Libourne	26	10	7	9	37	40	−3	37	
8	Neuville	26	9	8	9	44	40	+4	35	
9	Niort (res)	26	10	2	14	35	42	−7	32	
10	Lège Cap Ferret	26	8	7	11	38	35	+3	31	
11	Châtellerault	26	6	8	12	27	40	−13	26	
12	Bressuire (R)	26	6	7	13	34	52	−18	25	Relegation to Regional 1
13	Cognac (R)	26	6	5	15	33	63	−30	23	Relegation to Regional 1
14	Tartas (R)	26	5	6	15	44	63	−19	21	Relegation to Regional 1

Rules for classification: 1) points; 2) head-to-head results; 3) head-to-head goal difference; 4) goal difference; 5) number of goals scored; 6) fair play points; 7) draw
(P) Promoted; (R) Relegated

=== Group B: Pays de la Loire ===
Pos	Team	Pld	W	D	L	GF	GA	GD	Pts	Promotion or relegation
1	Saumur (P)	26	17	6	3	54	26	+28	57	Promotion to National 2
2	La Roche	26	16	6	4	64	29	+35	54	
3	Laval (res)	26	12	7	7	35	28	+7	43	
4	Le Mans (res)	26	13	3	10	43	34	+9	42	
5	Vertou (Note: Vertou were penalised for fielding a suspended player in the match against Poiré-sur-Vie on 2 April 2022. The original scoreline was 3–2. The match was awarded to Poiré-sur-Vie with a scoreline of 0–3, and Vertou were deducted a penalty point, in line with the regulations of the competition.)	26	12	5	9	44	39	+5	40	
6	Poiré-sur-Vie	26	10	6	10	39	31	+8	36 (Note: Poiré-sur-Vie 2–1 Pouzauges, Pouzauges 1–0 Poiré-sur-Vie. Poiré-sur-Vie 3 points +0 goal difference, Pouzauges 3 points, +0 goal difference. Overall goal difference applies)	
7	Pouzauges (Note: Pouzauges were penalised for fielding a suspended player in the match at Fontenay on 2 April 2022. The original scoreline was 0–0. The match was awarded to Fontenay with a scoreline of 3–0, and Pouzauges were deducted a penalty point, in line with the regulations of the competition.)	26	11	4	11	43	40	+3	36	
8	Challans (Note: Challans were penalised for fielding a suspended player in the match against Poiré-sur-Vie on 6 November 2021. The original scoreline was 0–0. The match was awarded to Poiré-sur-Vie with a scoreline of 3–0, and Challans were deducted a penalty point, in line with the regulations of the competition. On 22 June the league announced that Challans were deducted a further three points due to not meeting the obligations of the competition, with respect to article 6 (fielding teams in other competitions).)	26	11	5	10	47	43	+4	34	
9	Fontenay	26	9	6	11	33	35	−2	33	
10	Sablé	26	8	7	11	35	38	−3	31 (Note: Sablé 1–1 Saint-Philbert-de-Grand-Lieu, Sablé 4–1 Changé, Saint-Philbert-de-Grand-Lieu 1–2 Sablé, Saint-Philbert-de-Grand-Lieu 3–2 Changé, Changé 1–1 Sablé, Changé 1–1 Saint-Philbert-de-Grand-Lieu. Sablé 8 points, Saint-Philbert-de-Grand-Lieu 5 points, Changé 2 points.)	
11	Saint-Philbert-de-Grand-Lieu	26	8	7	11	33	49	−16	31	
12	Changé (Note: Changé were penalised for fielding a suspended player in the match at Pouzauges on 4 March 2022. The original scoreline was 0–1. The match was awarded to Pouzauges with a scoreline of 3–0, and Changé were deducted a penalty point, in line with the regulations of the competition. The decision was subsequently appealed, and the penalty removed pending result of the appeal. On 16 May 2022, the appeal was upheld, on the grounds that the original challenge was lodged more than 30 days after the game, and the original result re-instated.)	26	8	7	11	32	43	−11	31	
13	La Châtaigneraie (R)	26	8	2	16	33	53	−20	26	Relegation to Regional 1
14	Sautron (Note: Sautron were penalised for fielding a suspended player in the match against Challans on 15 January 2022. The original scoreline was 0–0. The match was awarded to Challans with a scoreline of 3–0, and Sautron were deducted a penalty point, in line with the regulations of the competition.) (R)	26	3	1	22	15	62	−47	9	Relegation to Regional 1

Rules for classification: 1) points; 2) head-to-head results; 3) head-to-head goal difference; 4) goal difference; 5) number of goals scored; 6) fair play points; 7) draw
(P) Promoted; (R) Relegated

=== Group C: Centre-Val de Loire ===
Pos	Team	Pld	W	D	L	GF	GA	GD	Pts	Promotion or relegation
1	Vierzon (P)	26	16	5	5	52	34	+18	53	Promotion to National 2
2	Ouest Tourangeau	26	12	9	5	53	42	+11	45	
3	Châteauroux (res)	26	12	5	9	43	40	+3	41	
4	Chartres (res)	26	12	4	10	52	50	+2	40 (Note: Chartres (res) 4–1 Montlouis-sur-Loire, Montlouis-sur-Loire 2–1 Chartres (res). Chartres (res) 3 points +2 goal difference, Monlouis-sur-Loire 3 points -2 goal difference.)	
5	Montlouis-sur-Loire	26	12	4	10	45	49	−4	40	
6	Orléans (res) (Note: Orléans (res) were penalised for fielding a suspended player in the match against Bourges Foot 18 (res) on 7 May 2022. The original scoreline was 2–2. Bourges Foot 18 (res) were awarded a 3–0 victory, and Orléans (res) were deducted a penalty point.)	26	12	4	10	42	37	+5	39	
7	Avoine Chinon	26	10	8	8	38	34	+4	38 (Note: Avoine Chinon 0–2 Saran, Saran 1–3 Avoine Chinon. Avoine Chinon 3 points 0 goal difference, Saran 3 points 0 goal difference. Overall goal difference applies.)	
8	Saran (Note: Saran were penalised for fielding suspended players in the match at Amilly on 7 November 2021. The original scoreline was 0–4. Amilly were awarded a 3–0 victory, and Saran were deducted a penalty point.)	26	12	3	11	33	35	−2	38	
9	Châteauneuf-sur-Loire	26	10	6	10	28	25	+3	36	
10	Bourges Foot 18 (res) (Note: Bourges Foot 18 (res) were penalised for fielding a suspended player in the match at Châteauroux (res) on 10 October 2021. The original scoreline was 1–1. Châteauroux (res) were awarded a 3–0 victory, and Bourges Foot 18 (res) were deducted a penalty point.)	26	11	3	12	43	38	+5	35	
11	Montargis	26	8	5	13	33	40	−7	29	
12	Saint-Jean-le-Blanc	26	7	5	14	35	41	−6	26	
13	Déols (Note: Déols were penalised for fielding ineligible players in the match against Chartres (res) on 23 April 2022. The original scoreline was 3–2. Chartres (res) were awarded a 3–0 victory, and Déols were deducted a penalty point.) (R)	26	7	5	14	26	41	−15	25	Relegation to Regional 1
14	Amilly (R)	26	4	8	14	30	47	−17	20	Relegation to Regional 1

Rules for classification: 1) points; 2) head-to-head results; 3) head-to-head goal difference; 4) goal difference; 5) number of goals scored; 6) fair play points; 7) draw
(P) Promoted; (R) Relegated

=== Group D: Provence-Alpes-Côte d'Azur-Corsica ===
Pos	Team	Pld	W	D	L	GF	GA	GD	Pts	Promotion or relegation
1	Furiani-Agliani (P)	28	21	3	4	66	25	+41	66	Promotion to National 2
2	Cannes	28	19	2	7	53	21	+32	59	
3	Nice (res)	28	15	6	7	56	30	+26	51	
4	Lucciana	28	16	2	10	53	36	+17	50	
5	Gazélec Ajaccio	28	14	7	7	49	27	+22	49	
6	Cannet Rocheville	28	13	7	8	48	33	+15	46	
7	Rousset	28	12	9	7	58	41	+17	45	
8	Corte	28	14	2	12	41	44	−3	44	
9	Côte Bleue	28	12	4	12	35	36	−1	40	
10	AC Ajaccio (res)	28	11	6	11	36	36	0	39	
11	Istres (T)	28	10	7	11	43	39	+4	37	Avoided relegation. (see Season Outcomes)
12	Athlético Marseille (Note: Athlético Marseille forfeited the match at Corte on 2 April 2022. Corte were awarded a 3–0 victory, and Athlético Marseille were deducted a penalty point.) (D, R, R, D)	28	9	4	15	52	56	−4	30	Revival in District Provence
13	Endoume Marseille (Note: Endoume Marseille were penalised for fielding suspended players during the match at Cannet Rocheville on 26 February 2022. The original scoreline was 1–1. Cannet Rocheville were awarded a 3–0 victory, and Endoume Marseille were deducted a penalty point. Endoume Marseille were also penalised relating to the game at Côte Bleue on 9 April 2022. The original scoreline was 1–1. Côte Bleue were awarded a 3–0 victory, and Endoume Marseille were deducted a penalty point. Endoume Marseille forfeited the match at Corte on 28 May 2022. Corte were awarded a 3–0 victory, and Endoume Marseille were deducted a penalty point.) (R)	28	8	3	17	29	55	−26	24	Relegation to Regional 1
14	Saint-Jean Beaulieu (R)	28	1	6	21	21	77	−56	9	Relegation to Regional 1
15	Mandelieu (R)	28	1	0	27	22	106	−84	3	Relegation to Regional 1

Rules for classification: 1) points; 2) head-to-head results; 3) head-to-head goal difference; 4) goal difference; 5) number of goals scored; 6) fair play points; 7) draw
(D) Disqualified; (P) Promoted; (R) Relegated; (T) Qualified, but not yet for the particular phase indicated

=== Group E: Bourgogne-Franche-Comté ===
Pos	Team	Pld	W	D	L	GF	GA	GD	Pts	Promotion or relegation
1	Racing Besançon (Note: Technical challenges were lodged against three Racing Besançon games (against Sochaux (res), Grandvillars and Jura Dolois) in February 2022, following suspicion of COVID-19 vaccine pass fraud by a player. This was investigated, with the results removed from the table until the investigation was completed. The club were cleared of the suspicions, and the results reinstated on 14 April 2022.) (P)	26	17	6	3	51	27	+24	57	Promotion to National 2
2	Sochaux (res)	26	15	6	5	52	26	+26	51 (Note: Sochaux (res) 3–0 Gueugnon, Gueugnon 1–1 Sochaux (res). Sochaux (res) 4 points, Gueugnon 1 point.)	
3	Gueugnon	26	15	6	5	43	16	+27	51	
4	Jura Dolois (Note: Jura Dolois were penalised for fielding a suspended player in the match at Grandvillars on 5 February 2022. The original scoreline was 1–2. Grandvillars were awarded a 3–0 win, and Jura Dolois were deducted a penalty point.)	26	13	5	8	44	35	+9	43	
5	Besançon Football	26	12	6	8	39	36	+3	42	
6	Grandvillars	26	13	1	12	44	39	+5	40	
7	Dijon (res)	26	10	6	10	39	30	+9	36	
8	Montceau	26	9	6	11	36	36	0	33	
9	Pontarlier	26	9	5	12	36	41	−5	32 (Note: Pontarlier 4–3 Saint-Apollinaire, Saint-Apollinaire 2–2 Pontarlier. Pontarlier 4 points, Saint-Apollinaire 1 point.)	
10	Saint-Apollinaire	26	8	8	10	26	47	−21	32	
11	Is-Selongey	26	8	7	11	38	31	+7	31	
12	Morteau-Montlebon	26	7	6	13	33	43	−10	27	
13	Paron (R)	26	6	3	17	18	47	−29	21	Relegation to Regional 1
14	Valdahon-Vercel (R)	26	3	3	20	21	66	−45	12	Relegation to Regional 1

Rules for classification: 1) points; 2) head-to-head results; 3) head-to-head goal difference; 4) goal difference; 5) number of goals scored; 6) fair play points; 7) draw
(P) Promoted; (R) Relegated

=== Group F: Grand Est ===
Pos	Team	Pld	W	D	L	GF	GA	GD	Pts	Promotion or relegation
1	Colmar (P)	26	18	5	3	49	20	+29	59	Promotion to National 2
2	Raon-l'Étape	26	13	9	4	47	27	+20	48 (Note: Raon-l'Étape 1–1 ESTAC Troyes (res), ESTAC Troyes (res) 2–2 Raon-l'Étape. Raon-l'Étape 2 points, 0 goal difference, ESTAC Troyes 2 points, 0 goal difference. Overall goal difference applies.)	
3	ESTAC Troyes (res)	26	13	9	4	54	36	+18	48	
4	Sarre-Union	26	12	6	8	47	33	+14	42	
5	RC Strasbourg (res)	26	10	9	7	35	28	+7	39	
6	Biesheim	26	10	7	9	34	41	−7	37	
7	Thaon	26	10	5	11	41	40	+1	35 (Note: Thaon 4–0 Mulhouse, Thaon 0–1 Nancy (res), Mulhouse 2–2 Thaon, Mulhouse 2–1 Nancy (res), Nancy (res) 1–2 Thaon, Nancy (res) 1–2 Mulhouse. Thaon 7 points +4 goal difference, Mulhouse 7 points -2 goal difference, Nancy (res) 3 points -2 goal difference.)	
8	Mulhouse (Note: On 12 May 2022, it was reported that Mulhouse had been penalised due to their coach not having the appropriate qualification. The team were deducted a penalty point.) (R)	26	10	6	10	45	38	+7	35	Relegation to Regional 1
9	Nancy (res)	26	10	5	11	47	36	+11	35	
10	Prix-lès-Mézières (Note: Prix-lès-Mézières deducted two points for currently unpublished reasons.)	26	9	7	10	27	38	−11	32	
11	Épernay	26	8	7	11	31	39	−8	31	
12	Illkirch-Graffenstaden	26	5	9	12	34	48	−14	24	
13	St-Louis Neuweg (Note: St-Louis Neuweg were deducted three points for not fulfilling the obligations of clubs competing in Championnat National 3, after its U19 and U18 teams reached three forfeits each in their respective leagues during March, triggering forfeit of their respective seasons. Regulations of the competition state that all teams must have a youth team competing at either U19 or U18 level.) (R)	26	7	4	15	30	47	−17	22	Relegation to Regional 1
14	Amnéville (Note: Amnéville deducted two points for currently unpublished reasons.) (R)	26	3	0	23	18	68	−50	7	Relegation to Regional 1

Rules for classification: 1) points; 2) head-to-head results; 3) head-to-head goal difference; 4) goal difference; 5) number of goals scored; 6) fair play points; 7) draw
(P) Promoted; (R) Relegated

=== Group H: Occitanie ===
Pos	Team	Pld	W	D	L	GF	GA	GD	Pts	Promotion or relegation
1	Alès (P)	26	19	3	4	52	22	+30	60	Promotion to National 2
2	Agde	26	13	7	6	36	23	+13	46	
3	Aigues-Mortes	26	12	7	7	40	27	+13	43	
4	Toulouse (res)	26	11	8	7	45	30	+15	41	
5	Stade Beaucairois	26	11	4	11	43	40	+3	37	
6	Balma (Note: Balma were penalised for fielding a suspended player in the match at Stade Beaucairois on 26 February 2022. The original scoreline was 1–1. Stade Beaucairois were awarded a 3–0 victory, and Balma were deducted a penalty point.)	26	10	7	9	31	37	−6	36	
7	Castanet	26	10	4	12	38	40	−2	34 (Note: Castanet 1–0 Alberes Argelès, Alberes Argelès 2–2 Castanet. Castanet 4 points, Alberes Argelès 1 point.)	
8	Alberes Argelès	26	8	10	8	35	36	−1	34	
9	Narbonne (R)	26	9	6	11	33	44	−11	33 (Note: Narbonne 3–3 Rodez (res), Rodez (res) 1–2 Narbonne. Narbonne 4 points, Rodez (res) 1 point.)	Relegation to Regional 1
10	Rodez (res)	26	8	9	9	49	49	0	33	
11	Blagnac (R)	26	8	8	10	35	31	+4	32	Relegation to Regional 1
12	Nîmes (res) (R)	26	6	7	13	29	39	−10	25	Relegation to Regional 1
13	Muret (R)	26	4	10	12	23	45	−22	22	Relegation to Regional 1
14	Fabrègues (R)	26	5	6	15	17	43	−26	21	Relegation to Regional 1

Rules for classification: 1) points; 2) head-to-head results; 3) head-to-head goal difference; 4) goal difference; 5) number of goals scored; 6) fair play points; 7) draw
(P) Promoted; (R) Relegated

=== Group I: Hauts-de-France ===
Pos	Team	Pld	W	D	L	GF	GA	GD	Pts	Promotion or relegation
1	Wasquehal (P)	26	16	5	5	46	23	+23	53	Promotion to National 2
2	Feignies Aulnoye (Note: On 6 October 2021, Feignies Aulnoye were penalised for fielding a suspended player in the match against AC Amiens on 25 September 2021. The original scoreline was 4–0. The match was awarded to AC Amiens with a scoreline of 3–0, and Feignies Aulnoye were deducted penalty point, in line with the regulations of the competition.)	26	15	7	4	37	21	+16	51	
3	Olympique Marcquois	26	12	7	7	42	27	+15	43	
4	Lille (res)	26	13	3	10	43	29	+14	42	
5	AC Amiens	26	11	7	8	32	25	+7	40	
6	Maubeuge	26	11	6	9	40	32	+8	39	
7	Valenciennes (res)	26	10	6	10	39	40	−1	36	
8	Amiens SC (res)	26	10	5	11	39	40	−1	35	
9	Vimy	26	9	4	13	33	38	−5	31 (Note: Vimy 4–1 Croix, Croix 1–2 Vimy. Vimy 6 points, Croix 0 points.)	
10	Croix	26	9	4	13	34	37	−3	31	
11	Chantilly	26	8	6	12	29	44	−15	30	
12	Saint-Omer (R)	26	7	8	11	20	33	−13	29	Relegation to Regional 1
13	Boulogne (res) (Note: Boulogne (res) were penalised for fielding a suspended player in the match at Lille (res) on 4 December 2021. The original scoreline was 4–0, which was not changed as part of the penalty. Boulogne (res) were deducted a penalty point.) (R)	26	8	3	15	20	35	−15	26	Relegation to Regional 1
14	Le Touquet (Note: Le Touquet were penalised for fielding a suspended player in the match at Chantilly on 25 May 2022. The original scoreline was 4–4. Chantilly were awarded a 3–0 victory. Le Touquet were deducted a penalty point. Le Touquet were also penalised for fielding a suspended player in the match against Boulogne (res) on 4 June 2022. The original scoreline was 2–0. Boulogne (res) were awarded a 3–0 victory. Le Touquet were deducted a penalty point.) (R)	26	5	5	16	29	59	−30	18	Relegation to Regional 1

Rules for classification: 1) points; 2) head-to-head results; 3) head-to-head goal difference; 4) goal difference; 5) number of goals scored; 6) fair play points; 7) draw
(P) Promoted; (R) Relegated

=== Group J: Normandy ===
Pos	Team	Pld	W	D	L	GF	GA	GD	Pts	Promotion or relegation
1	Évreux (P)	26	19	3	4	69	24	+45	60	Promotion to National 2
2	Oissel	26	14	10	2	41	23	+18	52	
3	Dieppe	26	16	2	8	38	32	+6	50	
4	Alençon	26	12	8	6	37	24	+13	44	
5	Vire	26	10	9	7	53	44	+9	39	
6	Le Havre (res) (Note: The match between Oissel and Le Havre (res) on 4 June 2022 was abandoned after 4 minutes due to bad weather. La Havre (res) forfeited the rearranged game on 11 June 2022.)	26	10	7	9	41	26	+15	36 (Note: Le Havre (res) 4–1 Saint-Lô, Saint-Lô 1–1 Le Havre (res). Le Havre (res) 4 points, Saint-Lô 1 point.)	
7	Saint-Lô	26	9	9	8	35	41	−6	36	
8	Quevilly-Rouen (res)	26	9	8	9	34	36	−2	35	
9	Cherbourg	26	8	6	12	34	40	−6	30 (Note: Cherbourg 3–0 Dives-Cabourg, Dives-Cabourg 0–2 Cherbourg. Cherbourg 6 points, Dives-Cabourg 0 points.)	
10	Dives-Cabourg	26	9	3	14	35	41	−6	30	
11	Avranches (res)	26	6	11	9	28	40	−12	29	
12	AG Caen	26	7	7	12	45	50	−5	28	
13	Romilly (R)	26	4	6	16	22	58	−36	18	Relegation to Regional 1
14	Bayeux (R)	26	2	5	19	18	51	−33	11	Relegation to Regional 1

Rules for classification: 1) points; 2) head-to-head results; 3) head-to-head goal difference; 4) goal difference; 5) number of goals scored; 6) fair play points; 7) draw
(P) Promoted; (R) Relegated

=== Group K: Brittany ===
Pos	Team	Pld	W	D	L	GF	GA	GD	Pts	Promotion or relegation
1	Rennes (res) (P)	26	15	4	7	61	34	+27	49 (Note: Rennes (res) 2–1 Milizac, Milizac 0–2 Rennes (res). Rennes (res) 6 points, Milizac 0 points.)	Promotion to National 2
2	Milizac	26	14	7	5	53	29	+24	49	
3	Fougères	26	15	3	8	53	31	+22	48	
4	Brest (res)	26	13	5	8	62	45	+17	44	
5	Saint-Colomban Locminé	26	12	7	7	59	32	+27	43	
6	Dinan-Léhon	26	11	9	6	46	25	+21	42	
7	Pontivy	26	12	5	9	38	35	+3	41	
8	Stade Briochin (res)	26	11	7	8	53	46	+7	40	
9	Lannion	26	11	5	10	48	40	+8	38	
10	TA Rennes	26	10	6	10	38	37	+1	36	
11	Stade Pontivyen (R)	26	9	6	11	38	48	−10	33	Relegation to Regional 1
12	Plouzané (R)	26	6	6	14	29	51	−22	24	Relegation to Regional 1
13	Guipry Messac (R)	26	3	7	16	31	67	−36	16	Relegation to Regional 1
14	Trégunc (R)	26	1	1	24	18	107	−89	4	Relegation to Regional 1

Rules for classification: 1) points; 2) head-to-head results; 3) head-to-head goal difference; 4) goal difference; 5) number of goals scored; 6) fair play points; 7) draw
(P) Promoted; (R) Relegated

=== Group L: Île-de-France ===
Pos	Team	Pld	W	D	L	GF	GA	GD	Pts	Promotion or relegation
1	Racing Club (Note: The match between Racing Club and Drancy, scheduled for the final day of the season, was postponed due to bad weather. Subsequently, the match was cancelled as it would have no impact on the outcomes of the season.) (P)	25	19	3	3	62	20	+42	60	Promotion to National 2
2	Paris FC (res)	26	14	7	5	47	31	+16	49	
3	Blanc-Mesnil	26	11	9	6	37	30	+7	42	
4	Brétigny	26	10	9	7	37	39	−2	39 (Note: Brétigny 2–0 Aubervilliers, Aubervilliers 1–1 Brétigny. Brétigny 4 points, Aubervilliers 1 point.)	
5	Aubervilliers	26	10	9	7	31	32	−1	39	
6	Paris Saint-Germain (res)	26	10	7	9	35	36	−1	37	
7	Linas-Montlhéry	26	10	6	10	35	38	−3	36	
8	Drancy	25	9	6	10	31	28	+3	33	
9	Ivry	26	8	6	12	37	44	−7	30	
10	Les Mureaux	26	8	5	13	26	35	−9	29	
11	Les Ulis	26	8	3	15	25	42	−17	27	
12	Créteil (res) (R)	26	6	8	12	26	31	−5	26	Relegation to Regional 1
13	Mantes (Note: Mantes were penalised for fielding suspended players in games at Ivry on 9 April 2022 and against Les Ulis on 30 April 2022. Ivry were awarded a 0–0 draw (original scoreline 0–1). Les Ulis were awarded a 0–1 win (original scoreline 2–1). Mantes were deducted two penalty points.) (R)	26	5	10	11	26	31	−5	23	Relegation to Regional 1
14	Meaux Academy (Note: Meaux Academy were penalised after their match against Blanc-Mesnil on 9 April 2022 was abandoned by the referee after insults and death threats made towards him. The scoreline at the time of abandonment was 1–2. Blanc-Mesnil were awarded a 0–2 victory. Meaux Academy were deducted a penalty point.) (R)	26	4	10	12	16	34	−18	21	Relegation to Regional 1

Rules for classification: 1) points; 2) head-to-head results; 3) head-to-head goal difference; 4) goal difference; 5) number of goals scored; 6) fair play points; 7) draw
(P) Promoted; (R) Relegated

=== Group M: Auvergne-Rhône-Alpes ===
Pos	Team	Pld	W	D	L	GF	GA	GD	Pts	Promotion or relegation
1	Thonon Évian (P)	26	17	6	3	59	26	+33	57	Promotion to National 2
2	Chambéry	26	15	4	7	57	31	+26	49	
3	Saint-Étienne (res)	26	13	9	4	47	28	+19	48	
4	Ain Sud	26	13	8	5	40	23	+17	47	
5	Bourgoin-Jallieu	26	12	7	7	44	36	+8	43 (Note: Bourgoin-Jallieu 2–2 Hauts Lyonnais, Hauts Lyonnais 2–3 Bourgoin-Jallieu. Bourgoin-Jallieu 4 points, Hauts Lyonnais 1 point.)	
6	Hauts Lyonnais	26	12	7	7	45	38	+7	43	
7	Limonest	26	9	7	10	41	37	+4	34 (Note: Limonest 2–2 Vaulx-en-Velin, Vaulx-en-Velin 1–1 Limonest. Limonst 2 points 0 goal difference, Vaulx-en-Velin 2 points 0 goal difference. Overall goal difference applies)	
8	Vaulx-en-Velin	26	9	7	10	40	40	0	34	
9	Montluçon	26	8	8	10	36	42	−6	32	
10	Clermont (res)	26	8	5	13	39	50	−11	29	
11	Lyon La Duchère (res) (Note: Lyon La Duchère (res) were penalised for fielding a suspended player in the match at Bourgoin-Jallieu on 18 December 2021. The original scoreline was 3–1. Bourgoin-Jallieu were awarded a 3–0 victory, and Lyon La Duchère (res) were deducted a penalty point.)	26	7	7	12	26	32	−6	27	
12	Velay (R)	26	5	7	14	25	44	−19	22	Relegation to Regional 1
13	Aurillac (R)	26	4	7	15	34	58	−24	19	Relegation to Regional 1
14	Moulins (R)	26	3	5	18	25	73	−48	14	Relegation to Regional 1

Rules for classification: 1) points; 2) head-to-head results; 3) head-to-head goal difference; 4) goal difference; 5) number of goals scored; 6) fair play points; 7) draw
(P) Promoted; (R) Relegated

== Top scorers ==
As of 12 June 2022.

Rank	Player	Club	Goals
1	(Algeria) Ilyes Chaïbi	Thonon Evian	22
2	(France) Kamal Dadi	Vierzon	21
3	(France) Mehdi Jaki	Anglet	20
3	(France) Oumar Gassama	Saint-Jean-le-Blanc	20
3	(France) Stan Janno	Stade Briochin (res)	20
3	(Germany) Mamadou Diallo	Blanc-Mesnil	20
7	(France) Hatim Far	Rodez (res)	19
7	(Morocco) Wail Bouhoutt	Saumur	19
7	(France) Balamine Savane	Racing Club	19
10	(France) Jérémy Billy	La Roche	18
10	(France) Sofiane Bourouis	Lucciana	18
10	(France) Ikauar Mendés	Évreux	18
10	(France) Sofiane Sidi Ali	Rousset	18

== Season outcomes ==
=== Promotion ===
Stade Bordelais, Saumur, Vierzon, Furiani-Agliani, Racing Besançon, Colmar, Alès, Wasquehal, Évreux, Rennes (res), Racing Club and Thonon Évian finished in the promotion places, and were promoted to 2022–23 Championnat National 2, subject to ratification by the FFF and DNCG.

=== Relegation ===
Bressuire, Cognac, Tartas, La Châtaigneraie, Sautron, Saint-Jean-le-Blanc, Déols, Amilly, Istres, Athlético Marseille, Marseille Endoume, Saint-Jean Beaulieu, Mandelieu, Paron, Valdahon-Vercel, Illkirch-Graffenstaden, Saint-Louis Neuweg, Amnéville, Blagnac, Nîmes (res), Muret, Fabrègues, Saint-Omer, Boulogne (res), Le Touquet, Romilly, Bayeux, Stade Pontivyen, Plouzané, Guipry Messac, Trégunc, Créteil (res), Mantes, Meaux Academy, Velay, Aurillac and Moulins finished in the relegation zones and were relegated to Régional 1 for the 2022–23 season, subject to any reprieves confirmed in the next section.

=== Reprieves ===
On 14 June 2022, the Occitanie league announced that Narbonne were to be deducted 3 points for not entering a team in the Coupe Gambardella, which is a mandatory rule for competing in National 3. Narbonne appealed, claiming they did enter a team, received a bye in the first round, and forfeited the second round. The decision was upheld on appeal on 21 July 2022. As a result Rodez (res) are reprieved from relegation in Group H.

On 20 June 2022, the DNCG announced that Stade Plabennécois, relegated from 2021–22 Championnat National 2, would be further relegated to Régional 1 level, due to financial issues. The decision is subject to appeal. If the decision is upheld, a reprieve would be required in Group K: Brittany. This would see Stade Pontivyen reprieved.

On 28 June 2022, the Centre-Val de Loire league announced that Tours FC were to be denied promotion from Régional 1 for financial reasons. The decision was overturned on appeal.

On 1 July 2022, the DNCG upheld its previous decision to relegate Béziers from 2021–22 Championnat National 2, reprieving Romorantin. As a result, an extra club would be relegated from Group H: Occitanie, namely Rodez (res), and a club would be reprieved from Group C: Centre-Val de Loire, namely Saint-Jean-le-Blanc

Also on 1 July 2022, the FFF confirmed that Monaco (res), already relegated from 2021–22 Championnat National 2, had declined to participate in Championnat National 3. Therefore, Istres were reprieved from relegation in Group D.

On 12 July 2022, the Grand Est league announced that Mulhouse were to be relegated to Régional 1 for financial reasons. This is subject to appeal. If the decision is upheld, a reprieve would be required in Group E. In all likelihood, due to the short amount of time until the groups for 2022–23 are published, Illkirch Graffenstaden will be reprieved and Mulhouse will be added back to the group if the appeal is successful. Relegation was confirmed when the club was placed into receivership on 21 July 2022.
