= Chaibi =

Chaibi or Chaïbi is an Arabic surname, hailing from North Africa. Notable people with the surname include:

- Ilyes Chaïbi (born 1996), French-Algerian footballer
- Leïla Chaibi (born 1982), French politician
- Tahar Chaïbi (1946–2014), Tunisian footballer
