= Mohamed Ben Fredj =

Footballer (born 2000)

Personal information
- Date of birth: 9 May 2000 (age 26)
- Place of birth: Toulon, France
- Height: 1.79 m (5 ft 10 in)
- Position: Forward

Team information
- Current team: Créteil
- Number: 14

Youth career
- 2009–2013: Toulon
- 2013–2016: Sanary
- 2016–2017: La Valette

Senior career*
Years	Team	Apps	(Gls)
2017–2020	Marseille II	60	(15)
2020–2023	Auxerre II	25	(9)
2021–2023	Auxerre	8	(1)
2022–2023	→ Le Puy (loan)	33	(13)
2023–2025	Dijon	30	(4)
2024–2025	Dijon II	4	(3)
2025	→ Le Puy (loan)	14	(7)
2025–	Créteil	7	(4)

International career
2019	Tunisia U23	3	(0)
- * Club domestic league appearances and goals as of 4 October 2025

Mohamed Ben Fredj (born 9 May 2000) is a professional footballer who plays as a forward for Championnat National 1 club Créteil. Born in France, he is a former Tunisia youth international.

== Club career ==
Ben Fredj began his senior career with the reserve side of Marseille in 2017. He transferred to Auxerre on 14 June 2020. He made his professional debut with Auxerre in a 3–0 Ligue 2 loss to Pau FC on 20 April 2021.

On 30 July 2022, Ben Fredj moved on loan to Le Puy. He scored the only goal in a Coupe de France win in the round of 32 against Ligue 1 side Nice.

== International career ==
Born in France, Ben Fredj is of Tunisian descent. He was called up to represent the Tunisia U23s for some friendlies in June 2019.

== Honours ==
Le Puy

- Championnat National 2: 2024–25
