= Olympique Saumur FC =

French football club

Saumur
- Full name: Olympique Saumur Football Club
- Founded: 2000
- Ground: Stade des Rives du Thouet; Saumur, Pays de la Loire, France
- Capacity: 2,500
- Chairman: Stéphane Montanier
- Manager: Julien Sourice
- League: National 1 Group B
- 2022–23: National 2 Group D, 9th
- Website: https://www.olympiquesaumur.fr
| Home colours | Away colours |

Olympique de Saumur Football Club (French pronunciation: [ɔlɛ̃mpik də somyʁ futbol klœb]) is a French association football club founded in 2000. They are based in Saumur, Pays de la Loire and since 2022–23 they play in the Championnat National 1, the fourth tier of the French football league system. They play at the Stade des Rives du Thouet in Saumur.

== History ==
The club's early incarnation Olympique Saumur was formed in 1945 and played for approximately 44 years before dissolving as a result of a merger with amateur club SC Bagneux. The club that formed was called Racing Club de Saumur. A decade later, RC Saumur decided to merge with fellow local clubs AS Saumur and ASPTT Saumur to form a single club called Olympique de Saumur Football Club. Following the merger, the club became one of the larger clubs in the department with over 507 people associated with the club. This included at least 100 senior players and 300 youth players comprised into 25 different teams represented the club. In just the club's second season, they won the amateur double winning the Atlantique Division Super Régionale without conceding any defeats and also winning the Coupe de Atlantique.

Two seasons later, the club finished 3rd in the Atlantique Division d'Honneur winning promotion to CFA 2. In amazing fashion, the club won promotion to the Championnat de France amateur on the final day of the 2008–09 season winning their final match 1–0. The only goal of the match for Saumur was scored in the 93rd and penultimate minute. The DNCG, who oversee the legal and financial accounts of football clubs in France, ruled the club ineligible for qualification to the CFA.

On 6 August, just three days before the start of the CFA season, the CNSOF, which governs football in France, ruled that the club would be allowed promotion to the CFA. However, just a day later, the FFF announced that they had rejected the CNOSF's proposal for integrating Saumur into the CFA. The club responding by announcing their intent to appeal the judgment in Administrative court.

On 2021–22 season, Saumur promoted to National 2 from next season.

== Youth ==
Olympique Saumur operates a very strong youth system with players playing in local leagues as early as seven years of age. The club's under-11 side won the 2008–09 edition of the Coupe Nationale des Benjamins, while the under-18 side reached the Round of 32 of the 2003 Coupe Gambardella, despite being an amateur club.

== Kit ==
The club's kit is manufactured by Puma and primarily consists of red and blue combinations.

From 2021 to 2022 season, The club's kit is manufactured by Nike.

== Honours ==
- Championnat National 3
  - Champions (1): 2021–22 [Group B]

== Current squad ==
As of 10 September 2025

Note: Flags indicate national team as defined under FIFA eligibility rules; some limited exceptions apply. Players may hold more than one non-FIFA nationality.

| No. | Pos. | Nation | Player |
|---|---|---|---|
| 1 | GK | FRA | Quentin Galvez-Diarra |
| 2 | DF | FRA | Maël Landelle |
| 3 | DF | FRA | Théo Lefebvre |
| 4 | DF | FRA | Benjamin Pillier |
| 5 | DF | FRA | Mathis Bochereau |
| 6 | MF | FRA | Artur Viaud |
| 7 | FW | FRA | Quentin Le Coz |
| 8 | MF | FRA | Walim Lgharbi |
| 9 | FW | CGO | Stany Epagna |
| 10 | MF | FRA | Mathis Blanchard |
| 11 | MF | FRA | Nathan Benmoussa |
| 12 | FW | CTA | Hamissou Dangabo (on loan from Nantes B) |

| No. | Pos. | Nation | Player |
|---|---|---|---|
| 14 | MF | FRA | Bradley Mbuta |
| 15 | FW | FRA | Quentin Biettmann |
| 16 | GK | FRA | Axel Granger |
| 19 | MF | CGO | Bovid Itoua Ngoua |
| 20 | MF | ANG | Plamedi Buni Jorge |
| 22 | MF | FRA | Yannis Matingou |
| 24 | MF | FRA | Emmanuel Bourgaud |
| 26 | FW | FRA | Abdel Nour Bouhenni |
| 27 | MF | FRA | Martin Vidgrin |
| 29 | DF | FRA | Mattéo Pezard |
| — | DF | FRA | Aubrel Koutsimouka |

== Notable players ==
- (Guinea) Sidiki Cherif (youth)
