= Germain Kapela =

French footballer (born 2002)

Personal information
- Full name: Germain Mbiyavanga Kapela
- Date of birth: 19 May 2002 (age 24)
- Place of birth: France
- Height: 1.80 m (5 ft 11 in)
- Position: Left-back

Team information
- Current team: Blois

Youth career
- 2013–2020: Reims

Senior career*
Years	Team	Apps	(Gls)
2020–2022	FC Chambly	3	(0)
2022–2024	FC Chamalières	53	(1)
2024–2025	Andrézieux	13	(0)
2025–	Blois	34	(0)
- * Club domestic league appearances and goals as of 7 February 2026

Germain Mbiyavanga Kapela (born 19 May 2002) is a French footballer who plays as a left-back for Championnat National 1 side Blois.

== Career ==
Kapela was a product of the Reims youth academy, before moving to Chambly in 2020. He made his professional debut with Chambly in a 1–0 Ligue 2 loss to Clermont on 13 February 2021.

On July 6, 2024, Kapela signed with Championnat National 2 side Andrézieux.
