= Plamedi Buni Jorge =

French footballer

Personal information
- Full name: Mafuta Plamedi Buni Jorge
- Date of birth: 7 September 2000 (age 26)
- Place of birth: Uíge, Angola
- Height: 1.67 m (5 ft 6 in)
- Position: Midfielder

Team information
- Current team: Saumur
- Number: 20

Senior career*
Years	Team	Apps	(Gls)
2017–2018	Tours II	4	(0)
2018–2020	Angers II	11	(0)
2020–2023	Rodez II	19	(1)
2021–2023	Rodez	6	(0)
2023	Créteil	9	(0)
2024–	Saumur	26	(0)
- * Club domestic league appearances and goals as of 4 December 2025

Mafuta Plamedi Buni Jorge (born 7 September 2000) is an Angolan professional footballer who plays as a midfielder for French Championnat National 1 club Saumur.

== Club career ==
Buni Jorge began his senior career in 2017 with the reserves of Tours FC, and followed that up with stints at the reserves of Angers and Rodez. He made his professional debut with Rodez in a 2–0 Ligue 2 win over Niort on 23 October 2021.

On 31 January 2023, Buni Jorge transferred to Créteil in Championnat National 2.
