= Souleymane Sawadogo =

Burkinabé footballer

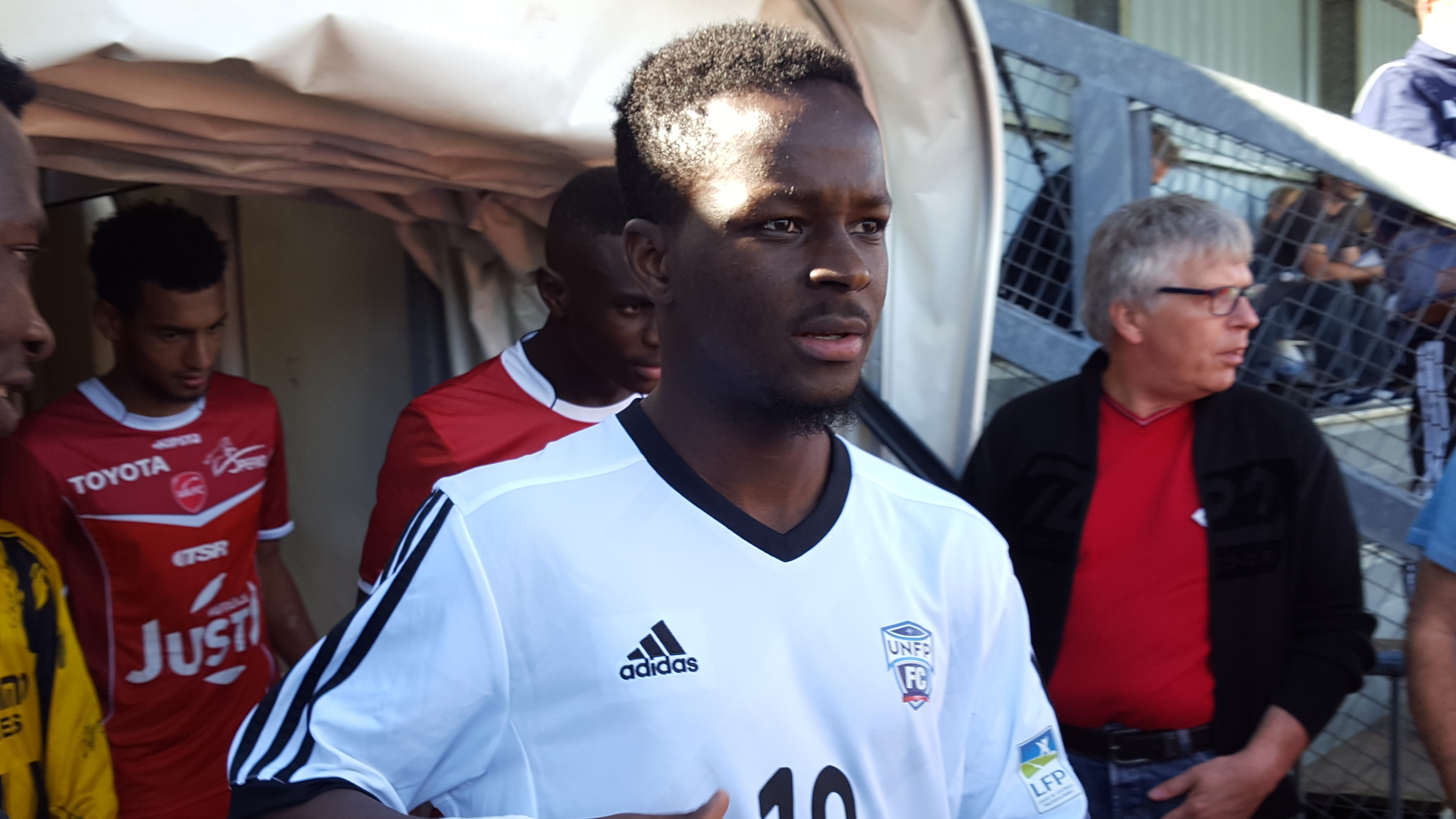

Personal information
- Date of birth: 9 January 1993 (age 33)
- Place of birth: Ouagadougou, Burkina Faso
- Height: 1.74 m (5 ft 8 1/2 in)
- Position: Midfielder

Team information
- Current team: US Granville

Youth career
- –2012: Auxerre

Senior career*
Years	Team	Apps	(Gls)
2012–2014	Auxerre B	31	(12)
2013–2014	Auxerre	22	(0)
2014–2016	Clermont	20	(2)
2016–2017	Châteauroux	16	(1)
2018–2019	Levadiakos	34	(2)
2020	Gazélec Ajaccio	8	(0)
2020–2021	US Créteil	27	(0)
2022–	Granville	19	(6)

International career^{‡}
2018	Burkina Faso	1	(0)
- * Club domestic league appearances and goals as of 20:37, 5 November 2022 (UTC) ‡ National team caps and goals as of 23 October 2018

Souleymane Sawadogo (born 9 January 1993) is a Burkinabé professional football player, who plays for French Championnat National 1 club US Granville.

== Club career ==
Sawadogo made his Ligue 2 debut with AJ Auxerre at 9 August 2013 against Nîmes Olympique. In 2014, he joined Clermont Foot. On 22 December he signed a 2 1/2-year contract with Super League Greece club Levadiakos for an undisclosed fee. It was his first time in his career that will play in the highest level. On 14 April 2018, he scored with an astonishing effort helping his club to win 1-0 rivals Asteras Tripolis. It was his first goal with the club.

Sawadogo returned to France with Gazélec Ajaccio in January 2020, and then moved to US Créteil-Lusitanos in June 2020. He was released at the end of the season, and spent six months without a club, before signing for US Granville in early February 2022.

== International career ==
Sawadogo made his debut for the Burkina Faso national football team in a 1-0 friendly win over Cameroon national football team on 27 May 2018.

== Career statistics ==
As of match played 29 October 2022

Appearances and goals by club, season and competition
Club	Season	League			National Cup		League Cup		Other		Total	
Club	Season	Division	Apps	Goals	Apps	Goals	Apps	Goals	Apps	Goals	Apps	Goals
Auxerre II	2011–12	CFA	1	0	—		—		—		1	0
Auxerre II	2012–13	CFA	22	2	—		—		—		22	2
Auxerre II	2013–14	CFA 2	8	7	—		—		—		8	7
Auxerre II	Total		31	9	—		—		—		31	9
Auxerre	2013–14	Ligue 2	22	0	2	0	3	0	—		27	0
Clermont II	2014–15	CFA 2	5	0	—		—		—		5	0
Clermont II	2015–16	CFA 2	7	1	—		—		—		7	1
Clermont II	Total		12	1	—		—		—		12	1
Clermont	2014–15	Ligue 2	18	2	1	1	3	1	—		22	4
Clermont	2015–16	Ligue 2	2	0	0	0	0	0	—		2	0
Clermont	Total		20	2	1	1	3	1	0	0	24	4
Châteauroux	2016–17	National	16	1	1	0	0	0	—		17	1
Levadiakos	2017–18	Super League Greece	9	1	—		—		—		9	1
Levadiakos	2018–19	Super League Greece	25	1	3	0	—		—		28	1
Levadiakos	Total		34	2	3	0	—		—		37	2
Gazélec Ajaccio	2019–20	National	8	0	—		—		—		8	0
Créteil	2020–21	National	27	0	2	2	—		—		29	2
Granville	2021–22	National 2	12	4	0	0	—		—		12	4
Granville	2022–23	National 2	7	2	1	1	—		—		8	3
Granville	Total		19	6	1	1	—		—		20	7
Career total			189	21	10	4	6	1	0	0	205	26
