= Georgino M'Vondo =

Central African Republic footballer

Personal information
- Full name: Georgino Hollibrius Cherubin M'Vondo-Ze
- Date of birth: 12 August 1997 (age 29)
- Place of birth: Bangui, Central African Republic
- Height: 1.91 m (6 ft 3 in)
- Position: Striker

Team information
- Current team: Vierzon
- Number: 24

Youth career
- Dijon

Senior career*
Years	Team	Apps	(Gls)
2017–2018	Saint-Apollinaire	28	(6)
2018	Avallonnais	10	(1)
2019–2020	Is-Selongey	24	(11)
2020–2021	Gueugnon	9	(4)
2021–2022	Angoulême	20	(3)
2022–	Vierzon	7	(0)

International career^{‡}
2021–	Central African Republic	11	(0)
- * Club domestic league appearances and goals as of 00:16, 6 June 2021 (UTC) ‡ National team caps and goals as of 00:16, 6 June 2021 (UTC)

Georgino M'Vondo Ze (born 12 August 1997) is a Central African professional footballer who plays as a forward for Vierzon and the Central African Republic national team.

== Career ==
M'Vondo has played in the Championnat National 3, first with Saint-Apollinair, then followed by stints at Avallonnais, and Is-Selongey. In January 2020, he signed with Gueugnon.

== International career ==
In May 2021, M'Vondo was called up for the first time to represent the Central African Republic national team. He made his debut in a friendly 2–0 loss to Rwanda on 4 June 2021.
