= Khaled Mazgouti =

French footballer (born 1994)

Personal information
- Full name: Khaled Mazgouti
- Date of birth: 27 November 1994 (age 31)
- Place of birth: Sète, France
- Height: 1.84 m (6 ft 0 in)
- Position: Midfielder

Team information
- Current team: RCO Agde
- Number: 10

Youth career
- 2007–2012: Montagnacoise
- 2012–2013: Lattoise
- 2013–2014: Montagnacoise
- 2014: Frontignan

Senior career*
Years	Team	Apps	(Gls)
2014–2015	Frontignan		
2015–2016	La Clermontaise		
2016–2017	U.S. Montagnacoise		
2017–2020	Béziers	1	(0)
2019–2020	Béziers II	7	(4)
2020–2021	Sète	0	(0)
2021–	Agde	49	(7)
- * Club domestic league appearances and goals as of 20:07, 14 July 2024 (UTC)

Khaled Mazgouti (born 27 November 1994) is a French footballer who plays for RCO Agde as a midfielder.

== Early life ==
Mazgouti was born in Sète, France, to a Moroccan father born in Lamzagta-Ali-Saka. He acquired French nationality on 20 November 2000 through the collective effect of his father's naturalization.

== Professional career ==
Mazgouti made his professional debut for AS Béziers in a 2–1 Ligue 2 loss to US Orléans on 21 December 2018.
