= Tiago Castro =

Portuguese footballer (born 1996)

Personal information
- Full name: Tiago Augusto Oliveira Castro
- Date of birth: 31 January 1996 (age 30)
- Place of birth: Guimarães, Portugal
- Height: 1.76 m (5 ft 9 in)
- Position: Left midfielder

Team information
- Current team: Feirense
- Number: 27

Youth career
- 2008–2009: Sporting CP
- 2010–2013: Braga
- 2013–2015: Vitória de Guimarães

Senior career*
| Years | Team | Apps | (Gls) |
| 2015–2019 | Vitória de Guimarães B | 95 | (7) |
| 2019–2020 | Vitória de Setúbal | 6 | (0) |
| 2020–2021 | União de Leiria | 10 | (0) |
| 2021–2024 | Paris 13 Atletico | 53 | (12) |
| 2024–2025 | Lusitanos Saint-Maur | 27 | (3) |
| 2025–2026 | Paris 13 Atletico | 23 | (2) |
| 2026– | Feirense | 4 | (0) |

International career^{‡}
| 2011 | Portugal U15 | 1 | (0) |
| 2011–2012 | Portugal U16 | 7 | (0) |
- * Club domestic league appearances and goals as of 5 September 2026 ‡ National team caps and goals as of 7 February 2012

Tiago Augusto Oliveira Castro (born 31 January 1996) is a Portuguese professional footballer who plays as a left midfielder for Liga Portugal 2 club Feirense.

== Career ==
On 13 December 2015, Castro made his professional debut with Vitória Guimarães B in a 2015–16 Segunda Liga match against Sporting Covilhã.

On 17 August 2021, Castro signed for French club Paris 13 Atletico.

== Honours ==
Paris 13 Atletico

- Championnat National 2: 2021–22
