= Floris Isola =

French footballer (born 1991)

Personal information
- Date of birth: 31 October 1991 (age 35)
- Place of birth: Sète, France
- Height: 1.78 m (5 ft 10 in)
- Position: Defensive midfielder

Youth career
- 2001–2008: Montpellier

Senior career*
| Years | Team | Apps | (Gls) |
| 2008–2009 | Montpellier B | 3 | (0) |
| 2009–2010 | Martigues | 4 | (0) |
| 2011–2012 | Košice | 33 | (1) |
| 2013–2020 | Sète 34 | 164 | (1) |
| 2020–2023 | Agde | 47 | (2) |
| 2023–2024 | Sète 34 | | |
- * Club domestic league appearances and goals

Floris Isola (born 31 October 1991) is a French former professional footballer who played as a defensive midfielder.

== Career ==
=== Early career ===
Isola was born in Sète, Hérault. He started his career in 2001 with Montpellier, and played his senior debut in the Championnat de France amateur for the Reserve team (Montpellier B) against ASF Andrézieux on 31 January 2009. He played three games for Montpellier Herault B, before joining league rivals Martigues.

=== MFK Košice ===
He made his debut for Košice against Nitra on 9 April 2011.

=== Sète ===
Isola was without a side for six months and returned to his native country to sign with his hometown club, FC Sète 34. He went on to make more than 150 league appearances for the club.

=== Agde ===
In the summer of 2020, after several seasons with Sète, Isola signed for RCO Agde.
