= Ilyes Chaïbi =

French footballer (born 1996)

Personal information
- Full name: Mohamed Ilyes Salah Chaïbi
- Date of birth: 12 October 1996 (age 30)
- Place of birth: Lyon, France
- Height: 1.76 m (5 ft 9 in)
- Position: Forward

Team information
- Current team: Bulle
- Number: 11

Youth career
- Saint-Priest
- Bron Grand Lyon
- 2011–2013: Evian
- 2013–2015: Monaco

Senior career*
Years	Team	Apps	(Gls)
2014–2018	Monaco B	39	(21)
2016–2018	Monaco	1	(0)
2016–2017	→ Ajaccio (loan)	17	(1)
2018	→ Wacker Innsbruck (loan)	0	(0)
2018	MC Alger	4	(0)
2019–2022	Thonon Evian	29+ (Note: Statistics are missing for the 2019–20 season.)	(23+)
2022–2023	Servette U21	27	(28)
2022–2023	Servette	2	(0)
2013–2024	Thonon Evian	23	(10)
2024–2025	Vevey-Sports	17	(9)
2025–	Bulle	12	(3)
- * Club domestic league appearances and goals as of 22 June 2025

Mohamed Ilyes Salah Chaïbi (born 12 October 1996) is a French professional footballer who plays as a forward for Swiss club Bulle.

== Career ==
Chaïbi is a youth exponent from Monaco. He made his league debut on 30 January 2016 in a 3–0 away defeat against Angers replacing Bernardo Silva after 80 minutes.

On 1 August 2016, Chaïbi joined Ligue 2 club Ajaccio on loan for a season.

In September 2019, after over one year without club, Chaïbi returned to his childhood club Thonon Evian in the Régional 1.

On 20 July 2022, Chaïbi moved to Servette U21, the under-21 team of Servette, who were allowed to sign more experienced players.

== Personal life ==
Born in France, Chaïbi is of Algerian descent. His younger brother Farès Chaïbi is also a professional footballer.

== Honours ==
Thonon Evian

- 1. Liga Classic group 1 : 2022-2023 ( Servette U21)
- Championnat National 3: 2021–22
- Régional 1 Auvergne-Rhône-Alpes: 2019–20
