= Brad Pirioua =

Central African Republic footballer (born 2000)

Personal information
- Full name: Brad Thomas Pirioua
- Date of birth: 6 March 2000 (age 26)
- Place of birth: Lagny-sur-Marne, France
- Height: 1.84 m (6 ft 0 in)
- Position: Midfielder

Team information
- Current team: Heraclea
- Number: 19

Senior career*
Years	Team	Apps	(Gls)
2020	La Louvière Centre	0	(0)
2020–2021	Montargis	5	(0)
2021	Atlético Porcuna	14	(1)
2022	Los Garres	15	(1)
2022–2023	Aubagne	11	(0)
2023–2024	Istres	14	(0)
2024–2025	Deportivo Marítimo	24	(1)
2025	Portogruaro	12	(2)
2025–	Heraclea	10	(0)

International career^{‡}
2021–	Central African Republic	18	(0)
- * Club domestic league appearances and goals as of 15 March 2026 ‡ National team caps and goals as of 12 October 2025

Brad Thomas Pirioua (born 6 March 2000) is a footballer who plays as a midfielder for Italian Serie D club Heraclea. Born in France, he plays for the Central African Republic national team. Despite being an international, he never played above a fourth-tier league on the club level.

== Career ==
Pirioua got his first experience abroad in January 2020 when he signed with the Belgian club La Louvière Centre where he stayed 6 months. In July 2020, he signed a contract with Montargis. On 1 August 2021, he moved to Spain and joined Atlético Porcuna. On 29 December 2021, Pirioua and Atlético Porcuna decided to mutually terminate the contract.

== International career ==
Pirioua made his debut with the Central African Republic national team in a 3–1 2022 FIFA World Cup qualification loss to Liberia on 16 November 2021.
