= Évreux FC 27 =

French football club

- Full name: Évreux Football Club 27
- Founded: 2009; 17 years ago
- Ground: Stade du 14 Juillet Madeleine
- Capacity: 300
- League: Régional 2, Normandy
- 2022–23: National 2 Group B, 12th (relegated)
Home colours	Away colours

Évreux Football Club 27 is a French association football club founded in 2009. They are based in Évreux, Normandy and as of 2023–24 they play in Régional 2, the seventh tier of the French football league system, after an administrative relegation by the DNCG in the 2022–23 season, followed by a decision by the league of Normandy to exclude them from Régional 1. They play at the Stade du 14 Juillet Madeleine in the town.

== History ==
The club's relatively late foundation is as a result of a merger between the two local clubs in the city, Évreux AC and ALM Évreux. The merger was initiated by professional football players Mathieu Bodmer and Bernard Mendy. Both players are from the city of Évreux and started their careers at Évreux AC. The merger was officially announced on 15 June 2009 following a meeting held between both club's official. Mathieu Bodmer was installed as president, but, due to his busy football schedule, agreed to give responsibility of the club to Abdel Bouchelagem, who will manage the club, Eric Fouda, who will be the sporting director, and Ossam Benali, who will handle the club's administrative tasks. Following the merger, the new club was inserted into the Championnat de France Amateur 2, replacing the old club, Évreux AC.

In February 2023, former Évreux youth player Ousmane Dembélé made a donation of €100,000 to the club amidst financial difficulties. This did not prevent the club suffering administrative relegation, as well as finishing in the relegation places of Championnat National 2 at the end of the 2022–23 season, taking the club back into the Régional divisions of the Normandy league.

== Honours ==
- Championnat National 3 Normandie (1)
- DH Normandie (1) 2014-15
- Regional 2 Normandie group D (1) 2023-24, 2024-25
- Coupe de Normandie (1) 2015-16

== Notable coaches ==
- Abdel Bouchelagem (2009–2010)

== Notable players ==
- (France) Sami Gtari
- (France) Christophe Cocard (youth)
- (France) Ousmane Dembélé (youth)
- (Mali) Sikou Niakaté (youth)
- (France) Dayot Upamecano (youth)
