= Direction Nationale du Contrôle de Gestion =

French football-related organization

- Formation: 1984
- Headquarters: Paris
- Region served: France
- Leadership: Richard Olivier
- Website: https://www.lfp.fr/reports-dncg

The Direction Nationale du Contrôle de Gestion (DNCG; French pronunciation: [de.ɛn.se.ʒe]) (English: National Directorate of Management Control) is the organization responsible for monitoring and overseeing the accounts of professional association football clubs in France. It was founded in 1984 and is an administrative directorate of the Ligue de Football Professionnel (LFP). The current president of the DNCG is Richard Olivier. In December 2007, French State Secretary for Sports Bernard Laporte claimed that the DNCG should be a Europe-wide body to create equality throughout the continent. However, the idea was later dismissed as being too complicated to implement.

Along with the LFP, the DNCG has a public mission of service. The mission of the DNCG is to oversee all financial operations of the 44 member clubs of the LFP (as well as those professional clubs recently relegated to the Championnat National), develop the resources of professional clubs, apply sanctions to those clubs breaking the rules of operation and to defend the morals and interests of French football in general.

At the end of each football season, the DNCG reviews the accounts of all the teams in the top five divisions in France. Clubs found to be in breach of rules can have a number of punishments enforced upon them including transfer embargoes or limiting the number of first-team players. More serious sanctions include demotion to a lower league or even complete expulsion from the French league system. The DNCG also has the power to change the number of teams in competitions depending on circumstances.
