= FC Chamalières =

French football club

- Full name: Football Club de Chamalières
- Founded: 1965; 61 years ago
- Ground: Complexe Sportif Claude Wolff, Chamalières
- Capacity: 1,500
- Chairman: Didier Chastang
- Manager: JaIïr Karam
- League: National 3 Group I
- 2023–24: National 2 Group A, 12th
- Website: https://fcchamalieres.fr

Football Club de Chamalières commonly known as FC Chamalières is a French football club based in Chamalières in the Clermont-Ferrand urban area in Auvergne-Rhône-Alpes, France. They were founded in 1965 and have played their home games at the Complexe Sportif Claude Wolff since 2007.

The club has climbed steadily through the amateur division, winning back-to-back promotions in 2015 and 2016 to reach the Championnat National 3 for the first time. The club plays in Championnat National 3, the fifth division of French football, having been relegated from the Championnat National 2 at the end of the 2023–24 season.

In the 2019–20 season, the club only retained their place in National 2 by winning the last game before the season was prematurely terminated due to the COVID-19 pandemic.

== Honours ==
- Division d'Honneur, Auvergne: 2016
- Championnat National 3, Auvergne-Rhône-Alpes: 2019
