= 2022–23 FC Annecy season =

FC Annecy
2022–23 season
- Presidents: Michel Rousseaux; Stéphane Loison
- Manager: Laurent Guyot
- Stadium: Parc des Sports
- Ligue 2: 17th
- Coupe de France: Semi-finals
- Top goalscorer: League: Moïse Sahi (15); All: Moïse Sahi (20)
Home colours	Away colours

The 2022–23 season was the 96th in the history of FC Annecy, and the club's first season back in the second division since 1993. The club participated in Ligue 2 and the Coupe de France, suffering relegation in the former while reaching the semi-finals in the latter.

== Players ==
As of 25 July 2022.

Note: Flags indicate national team as defined under FIFA eligibility rules; some limited exceptions apply. Players may hold more than one non-FIFA nationality.

No.	Pos.	Nation	Player
1	GK	FRA	Florian Escales
2	DF	FRA	Matthieu Sans
3	DF	FRA	Arnold Temanfo
4	DF	SEN	Bissenty Mendy
5	MF	ALG	Ahmed Kashi
6	MF	FRA	François Lajugie
8	DF	FRA	Jonathan Goncalves
9	FW	FRA	Romain Spano
10	FW	MTQ	Kévin Farade
11	MF	FRA	Jean-Jacques Rocchi
12	FW	FRA	Kévin Testud
13	DF	FRA	Gaby Jean

No.	Pos.	Nation	Player
14	DF	FRA	Kévin Mouanga
16	GK	FRA	Thomas Callens
17	MF	FRA	Vincent Pajot
18	MF	FRA	Madyen El Jaouhari
19	MF	FRA	Samuel Ntamack
22	FW	FRA	Clément Billemaz
23	FW	FRA	Alexy Bosetti
25	DF	FRA	Jonathan Ruque
26	MF	FRA	Alexandre Phliponeau
27	FW	FRA	Steve Shamal
29	DF	FRA	Maxime Bastian (on loan from Strasbourg)

== Pre-season and friendlies ==
Win Draw Loss Fixtures

5 July 2022 Friendly	Servette (Switzerland)	0–1	(France) Annecy	Nyon, Switzerland
17:00 CEST (UTC+2)			Frick 37' (o.g.)	Stadium: Colovray Sports Centre

9 July 2022 Friendly	Annecy (France)	2–0	(France) Nîmes	Chasse-sur-Rhône
17:00 CEST (UTC+2)	Spano 49', 52'		Koné (penalty missed) 29'	Stadium: Complexe Sportif de Moleyre

16 July 2022 Friendly	Annecy (France)	1–1	(France) Dijon	Lons-le-Saunier
16:00 CEST (UTC+2)	Temanfo 50'		Le Bihan 45+3'	Stadium: Stade Municipal; Attendance: 300

20 July 2022 Friendly	Thonon Évian (France)	4–2	(France) Annecy	Thonon-les-Bains
18:00 CEST (UTC+2)	Bouchema (yellow card) 18'; Touré 21'; Clairicia 64'; Hidasse 65'; Selé 75'		Bosetti 39'; Shamal 45+3'; Fillon (yellow card) 83'	Stadium: Stade Joseph-Moynat; Attendance: 460; Referee: Romain Perpinan

23 July 2022 Friendly	Villefranche (France)	1–1	(France) Annecy	Saint-Georges-de-Reneins
18:00 CEST (UTC+2)	Omana 10'		Testud 19'	Stadium: Stade municipal Attendance: 300; Referee: Aurélien Petit

17 December 2022 Friendly	Grenoble (France)	0–2	(France) Annecy	Saint-Marcellin
14:30 CET (UTC+1)			Pajot 47'; Sahi 55'	Stadium: Stade de la Saulaie

21 December 2022 Friendly	Servette (Switzerland)	4–2	(France) Annecy	Carouge, Switzerland
14:30 CET (UTC+1)				Stadium: Stade de la Fontenette

== Competitions ==
=== Overall record ===
Competition	First match	Last match	Starting round	Final position	Record							
Competition	First match	Last match	Starting round	Final position	Pld	W	D	L	GF	GA	GD	Win %
Ligue 2	30 July 2022	2 June 2023	Matchday 1	17th	38	11	12	15	39	51	−12	28.95
Coupe de France	29 October 2022	6 April 2023	Seventh round	Semi-finals	7	3	3	1	22	10	+12	42.86
Total					45	14	15	16	61	61	+0	31.11

Source: Soccerway

=== Ligue 2 ===
==== League table ====
Pos	Team	Pld	W	D	L	GF	GA	GD	Pts	Promotion or Relegation
15	Laval	38	14	4	20	44	56	−12	46	
16	Valenciennes	38	10	15	13	42	49	−7	45	
17	Annecy	38	11	12	15	39	51	−12	45	Spared from relegation
18	Dijon (R)	38	10	12	16	38	43	−5	42	Relegation to Championnat National
19	Nîmes (R)	38	10	6	22	44	62	−18	36	Relegation to Championnat National

Source: Ligue 2
Rules for classification: 1) Points; 2) Goal difference; 3) Number of goals scored; 4) Head-to-head goal difference; 5) Fair play points
(R) Relegated

==== Results summary ====
Overall								Home						Away					
Pld	W	D	L	GF	GA	GD	Pts	W	D	L	GF	GA	GD	W	D	L	GF	GA	GD
38	11	12	15	39	51	−12	45	9	4	6	18	18	0	2	8	9	21	33	−12

Source: Ligue 2

==== Results by round ====
Round	1	2	3	4	5	6	7	8	9	10	11	12	13	14	15	16	17	18	19
Ground	H	A	H	A	H	A	A	H	A	H	A	H	A	H	A	H	H	A	H
Result	L	L	L	D	D	W	D	W	L	L	W	L	L	W	D	W	D	D	
Position	15	19	19	19	18	17	17	12	15	17	13	16	16	14	15	15	14	14	

Source: Ligue 2
A = Away; H = Home; W = Win; D = Draw; L = Loss

==== Matches ====
The league fixtures were announced on 17 June 2022.

30 July 2022 1	Annecy	1–2	Niort	Annecy
19:00 CEST (UTC+2)	Temanfo 63'	Report	Merdji 29'; Boutobba 39' (pen.)	Stadium: Parc des Sports; Attendance: 5,288; Referee: Azzedine Souifi

6 August 2022 2	Amiens	1–0	Annecy	Amiens
19:00 CEST (UTC+2)	Arokodare 82'	Report		Stadium: Stade de la Licorne; Attendance: 5,479; Referee: Guillaume Paradis

13 August 2022 3	Annecy	0–1	Laval	Annecy
19:00 CEST (UTC+2)		Report	Maggiotti 14'	Stadium: Parc des Sports; Attendance: 4,600; Referee: Antoine Valnet

20 August 2022 4	Rodez	2–2	Annecy	Rodez
19:00 CEST (UTC+2)	Danger 32' (pen.); Depres 90'	Report	Sahi 3' (pen.), 33'	Stadium: Stade Paul-Lignon; Attendance: 1,339; Referee: Pierre Legat

27 August 2022 5	Annecy	0–0	Grenoble	Annecy
19:00 CEST (UTC+2)		Report		Stadium: Parc des Sports; Attendance: 7,618; Referee: Benjamin Lepaysant

30 August 2022 6	Dijon	0–2	Annecy	Dijon
20:45 CEST (UTC+2)		Report	Bosetti 39' (pen.); Shamal 90+1'	Stadium: Stade Gaston Gérard; Attendance: 7,662; Referee: Nicolas Rainville

2 September 2022 7	Metz	0–0	Annecy	Metz
20:45 CEST (UTC+2)		Report		Stadium: Stade Saint-Symphorien; Attendance: 12,880; Referee: Johan Hamel

10 September 2022 8	Annecy	1–0	Quevilly-Rouen	Annecy
19:00 CEST (UTC+2)	Bastian (yellow card) 26'; Bosetti 74'; Gonçalvés (yellow card) 90+4'	Report	Sangaré (yellow card) 28'; Cissokho (yellow card) 31'	Stadium: Parc des Sports; Attendance: 4,114; Referee: Gaël Angoula

17 September 2022 9	Le Havre	2–0	Annecy	Le Havre
19:00 CEST (UTC+2)	Kechta (yellow card) 49'; Casimir (yellow card) 67'; Alioui 75' (pen.); Cornette 83'	Report	Bastian (yellow card) 42' (yellow-red card) 63'; Mouanga (yellow card) 51'; Pajot (yellow card) 70'; Baldé (yellow card) 86'	Stadium: Stade Océane; Attendance: 5,965; Referee: Guillaume Paradis

1 October 2022 10	Annecy	0–2	Bastia	Annecy
19:00 CEST (UTC+2)		Report	Ndiaye (yellow card) 27'; Tavares 32'; Van Den Kerkhof 90'	Stadium: Parc des Sports; Attendance: 7,533; Referee: Azzédine Souifi

8 October 2022 11	Guingamp	0–4	Annecy	Guingamp
19:00 CEST (UTC+2)	Gaudin (yellow card) 64'; Barthelmé (yellow card) 71'	Report	Mendy (yellow card) 13'; Billemaz (yellow card) 30'; Kashi (yellow card) 34', (goal) 87'; Sahi 36'; Pajot (yellow card) 65'; Testud 82'; Spano 90+1'	Stadium: Stade de Roudourou; Attendance: 6,473; Referee: Jérémy Stinat

15 October 2022 12	Annecy	0–2	Pau	Annecy
19:00 CEST (UTC+2)	Demoncy (yellow card) 21'; Billemaz (yellow card) 25'; Mouanga (yellow card) 75'; Rocchi (yellow card) 80'	Report	Bassouamina 9', (yellow card) 49'; Evans (yellow card) 45+2'; Koffi (penalty scored) 79'	Stadium: Parc des Sports; Attendance: 5,875; Referee: Abdelatif Kherradji

22 October 2022 13	Bordeaux	1–0	Annecy	Bordeaux
19:00 CET (UTC+1)	Bakwa 22'; N'Simba (yellow card) 33'; Ihnatenko (yellow card) 71'; Badji (yellow card) 84'	Report	Temanfo (yellow card) 74'; Demoncy (yellow card) 90+6'	Stadium: Matmut Atlantique; Attendance: 17,217; Referee: Faouzi Benchabane

5 November 2022 14	Annecy	2–1	Sochaux	Annecy
19:00 CET (UTC+1)	Baldé 71'; Mouanga 81'	Report	Sissoko 7'; Prévot (yellow card) 77'; Armougom (yellow card) 77'; Aaneba (yellow card) 80'; Henry (yellow card) 86'	Stadium: Parc des Sports; Attendance: 6,145; Referee: Nicolas Rainville

12 November 2022 15	Caen	0–0	Annecy	Caen
19:00 CET (UTC+1)	Mbock (yellow card) 40'; Brahimi (yellow card) 85'; Ntim (yellow card) 90+1'	Report	Mendy (yellow card) 10'; Lajugie (yellow card) 67'; Pajot (yellow card) 78'; Mouanga (yellow card) 78'; Shamal (yellow card) 79'; Temanfo (yellow card) 90+4'	Stadium: Stade Michel d'Ornano; Attendance: 16,013; Referee: Olivier Thual

26 December 2022 16	Annecy	2–1	Saint-Étienne	Annecy
17:00 CET (UTC+1)	Sahi 2', 51'; Bastian (yellow card) 53'; Demoncy (yellow card) 70'; Billemaz (yellow card) 88'	Report	Pintor (yellow card) 8'; Pétrot 76'; Briançon (yellow card) 85'; Sow (yellow card) 90+2'	Stadium: Parc des Sports; Attendance: 12,000; Referee: Faouzi Benchabane

30 December 2022 17	Annecy	0–0	Nîmes	Annecy
21:00 CET (UTC+1)	Pajot (yellow card) 55'	Report	Labonne (yellow card) 78'	Stadium: Parc des Sports; Attendance: 6,513; Referee: Azzédine Souifi

10 January 2023 18	Valenciennes	2–2	Annecy	Valenciennes
19:00 CET (UTC+1)	Boutoutaou 45+1', 73'; Linguet (yellow card) 59'	Report	Sahi 42', 70'; Kashi (yellow card) 85'	Stadium: Stade du Hainaut; Attendance: 6,277; Referee: Benoît Bastien

13 January 2023 19	Annecy	2–0	Paris FC	Annecy
20:45 CET (UTC+1)	Kashi 40'; Billemaz (yellow card) 41'; Sahi 77'	Report	Bernauer (yellow card) 29'; Gueho (yellow card) 63'	Stadium: Parc des Sports; Attendance: 4,215; Referee: Abdelatif Kherradji

28 January 2023 20	Pau	2–2	Annecy	Pau
19:00 CET (UTC+1)	Bassouamina 53'; Boli 60'; Beusnard (yellow card) 84'	Report	Baldé 6'; Kashi (yellow card) 29'; Sahi 35'; Pajot (yellow card) 54'	Stadium: Nouste Camp; Attendance: 2,643; Referee: Alexandre Perreau Niel

31 January 2023 21	Annecy	2–0	Caen	Annecy
20:45 CET (UTC+1)	Kashi (yellow card) 48'; Billemaz 67'; Lajugie (yellow card) 76'; Testud 80'	Report	Thomas (yellow card) 44'; Vandermersch (yellow card) 62'; Mbock (yellow card) 64'; Daubin (yellow card) 82'	Stadium: Parc des Sports; Attendance: 6,156; Referee: Guillaume Paradis

4 February 2023 22	Saint-Étienne	3–2	Annecy	Saint-Étienne
15:00 CET (UTC+1)	Wadji 18'; Krasso 49'; Cafaro 83', (yellow card) 84'	Report	Pajot 17'; Bosetti 63'; Mouanga (yellow card) 88'	Stadium: Stade Geoffroy-Guichard; Attendance: 17,421; Referee: Aurélien Petit

11 February 2023 23	Laval	1–1	Annecy	Laval
19:00 CET (UTC+1)	Naidji 7'; Elisor (yellow card) 55'; Durbant (yellow card) 86'	Report	Pajot (yellow card) 23'; Mouanga 28'; Bastian (yellow card) 71'	Stadium: Stade Francis Le Basser; Attendance: 5,708; Referee: Karim Abed

18 February 2023 24	Annecy	2–0	Amiens	Annecy
19:00 CET (UTC+1)	Bosetti 5'; Shamal 69'	Report	Opoku (yellow card) 44'	Stadium: Parc des Sports; Attendance: 4,441; Referee: Antoine Valnet

25 February 2023 25	Sochaux	5–1	Annecy	Montbéliard
19:00 CET (UTC+1)	Doumbia 2', (penalty scored) 38'; Weissbeck 17'; Mauricio 58'; Mayenda 90+2'	Report	Lajugie (yellow card) 35'; Sahi (penalty scored) 63'	Stadium: Stade Auguste Bonal; Attendance: 10,645; Referee: Mikael Lesage

4 March 2023 26	Annecy	0–3	Metz	Annecy
19:00 CET (UTC+1)	Mendy (yellow card) 63'	Report	Mikautadze 27', 83'; Maziz 50'; Jean Jacques (yellow card) 54'	Stadium: Parc des Sports; Attendance: 10,587; Referee: Benjamin Lepaysant

11 March 2023 27	Grenoble	2–1	Annecy	Grenoble
19:00 CET (UTC+1)	Phaëton 4', 72', (red card) 90+4'; Correa (yellow card) 37'	Report	Kashi (yellow card) 23'; Sahi 30'; Testud (yellow card) 50'; Pajot (yellow card) 86' (yellow-red card) 90+4'	Stadium: Stade des Alpes; Attendance: 6,222; Referee: Alexandre Perreau Niel

18 March 2023 28	Annecy	1–1	Guingamp	Annecy
19:00 CET (UTC+1)	Sahi 21'; Lajugie (red card) 77'	Report	Lajugie 23' (o.g.)	Stadium: Parc des Sports; Attendance: 6,134; Referee: Gaël Angoula

1 April 2023 29	Nîmes	4–0	Annecy	Nîmes
19:00 CET (UTC+1)	Saïd 21', 25'; Mousset 60'; Fofana 73'	Report		Stadium: Stade des Antonins; Attendance: 1,700; Referee: Azzédine Souifi

10 April 2023 30	Annecy	2–1	Valenciennes	Annecy
20:45 CEST (UTC+2)	Kashi (yellow card) 16' (yellow-red card) 56'; Ntamack Ndimba 29'; Temanfo (yellow card) 45'; Shamal 84'	Report	Buatu 40'; Linguet (yellow card) 82'; Kaba (yellow card) 87'	Stadium: Parc des Sports; Attendance: 4,951; Referee: Alexandre Perreau Niel

15 April 2023 31	Bastia	3–0	Annecy	Furiani
19:00 CET (UTC+1)	Magri 1'; Djoco 12'; Santelli 31'	Report	Mouanga (yellow card) 65'; Falconnier (yellow card) 70'	Stadium: Stade Armand-Cesari; Attendance: 9,729; Referee: Guillaume Paradis

22 April 2023 32	Annecy	0–3	Rodez	Annecy
19:00 CEST (UTC+2)	Mendy (yellow card) 67'	Report	Corredor 53'; Senaya 59'; Depres 90+3'	Stadium: Parc des Sports; Attendance: 6,818; Referee: Benjamin Lepaysant

29 April 2023 33	Quevilly-Rouen	2–2	Annecy	Rouen
19:00 CEST (UTC+2)	Sissoko (yellow card) 18'; Mafouta 62'; Soumaré 88'	Report	Boé-Kane 9' (o.g.); Lajugie (yellow card) 36'; Sahi 75'; Mendy (yellow card) 90+2'	Stadium: Stade Robert Diochon; Attendance: 3,015; Referee: Karim Abed

6 May 2023 34	Annecy	1–1	Dijon	Annecy
19:00 CEST (UTC+2)	Pajot (yellow card) 50'; Mendy (yellow card) 71'; Demoncy (yellow card) 82'; Bosetti 86'	Report	Fofana (yellow card) 20'; Marié (yellow card) 82'; Soumaré 88'	Stadium: Parc des Sports; Attendance: 6,362; Referee: Pierre Gaillouste

15 May 2023 35	Annecy	1–0	Le Havre	Annecy
19:00 CEST (UTC+2)	Rocchi (yellow card) 39'; Mouanga 50'; Lajugie (yellow card) 55'; Demoncy (yellow card) 90+3'	Report	Targhalline (yellow card) 48'; Cornette (yellow card) 82'; Lekhal (yellow card) 85'; Thiaré (yellow card) 90', (red card) 90'; Sangante (yellow card) 90'; Opéri (yellow card) 90+1'	Stadium: Parc des Sports; Attendance: 8,063; Referee: Olivier Thual

20 May 2023 36	Niort	2–2	Annecy	Niort
19:00 CEST (UTC+2)	Zemzemi 49'; Sagna 58'; Merdji (yellow card) 90+4'	Report	Sahi 16', 64'; Pajot (yellow card) 52'; Bosetti (penalty missed) 72'; Farade (yellow card) 90+4'	Stadium: Stade René Gaillard; Attendance: 1,627; Referee: Azzédine Souifi

26 May 2023 37	Annecy	1–0	Bordeaux	Annecy
20:45 CEST (UTC+2)	Pajot 9', (yellow card) 32'; Demoncy (yellow card) 55'; Escales (yellow card) 84'	Report	Bakwa (yellow card) 50'; Mwanga (yellow card) 71'; Badji (yellow card) 83'	Stadium: Parc des Sports; Attendance: 12,705; Referee: Abdelatif Kherradji

2 June 2023 38	Paris FC	1–0	Annecy	Paris
20:45 CEST (UTC+2)	López 65'	Report	Mouanga (yellow card) 72'	Stadium: Stade Sébastien Charléty; Attendance: 5,412; Referee: Karim Abed

=== Coupe de France ===
29 October 2022 7th Rnd	Annecy	8–1	Diables Noirs	Annecy
16:00 CEST	Kashi 10'; Pajot 25' 45', 65'; Sahi (penalty scored) 34', 71'; Bengueddoudj 84', 88'	Report	Fadhul 29'	Stadium: Parc des Sports; Attendance: 2,238; Referee: Azzedine Souifi

18 November 2022 8th Rnd	Lyon La Duchère	2–3	Annecy	Lyon
19:00 CET	Penneteau 67'; Gadacha 90'	Report	Sahi 1', 60'; Shamal 90'	Stadium: Stade de Balmont; Attendance: 859; Referee: Gaël Angoula

7 January 2023 Rnd of 64	ES Villerupt-Thil	1–6	Annecy	Amnéville
18:00 CET	Mannarino (penalty scored) 19'	Report	Pajot 7', 29'; Temanfo 16'; Mendy 23'; Rocchi 63'; Baldé 75'	Stadium: Stade André Valentin; Referee: Olivier Thual

22 January 2023 Rnd of 32	ASM Belfort	1–1 (a.e.t.) (3–4 p)	Annecy	Belfort
18:30 CET	Sissoko 10'; Cuenin (red card) 100'	Report	Baldé 56'	Stadium: Stade Roger-Serzian; Attendance: 2,300; Referee: Bastien Dechepy
	Penalties
	Régnier (penalty scored); Ramos (penalty missed); Sissoko (penalty scored); Berrabha (penalty scored); Cuenin (penalty missed)		(penalty scored) Kashi; (penalty missed) Billemaz; (penalty scored) Pajot; (penalty scored) Temanfo; (penalty scored) Bosetti

8 February 2023 Rnd of 16	Paris FC	1–1 (5–6 p)	Annecy	Paris
18:15 CET	Boutaïb 90+1'	Report	Farade 67' (pen.)	Stadium: Stade Sébastien Charléty; Attendance: 4,216; Referee: Pierre Gaillouste
	Penalties
	Boutaïb (penalty scored); Caddy (penalty scored); Kebbal (penalty missed); Phiri (penalty scored); Mandouki (penalty missed); Koré (penalty scored); Hanin (penalty scored); Chergui (penalty missed)		(penalty scored) Farade; (penalty scored) Mouanga; (penalty missed) Testud; (penalty scored) El Jaouhari; (penalty missed) Billemaz; (penalty scored) Jean; (penalty scored) Goncalves; (penalty scored) Temanfo

1 March 2023 Quarter-finals	Marseille	2–2 (6–7 p)	Annecy	Marseille
21:00 CET (UTC+1)	Veretout 29'; Sánchez (penalty missed) 85'; Mughe 90+6'	Report	Sahi 53'; Mouanga 59'	Stadium: Stade Vélodrome; Attendance: 63,929; Referee: Benoît Bastien
	Penalties
	Guendouzi (penalty scored); Sánchez (penalty scored); Tavares (penalty missed); Clauss (penalty scored); Ounahi (penalty scored); Vitinha (penalty scored); Rongier (penalty scored); Balerdi (penalty missed)		(penalty missed) Kashi; (penalty scored) Demoncy; (penalty scored) Mouanga; (penalty scored) Baldé; (penalty scored) Jean; (penalty scored) El Jaouhari; (penalty scored) Shamal; (penalty scored) Lajugie

6 April 2023 Semi-finals	Annecy	1–2	Toulouse	Annecy
20:45 CEST (UTC+2)	Temanfo (yellow card) 25'; Bosetti (yellow card) 45+5', (penalty scored) 51'	Report	Aboukhlal 36' van den Boomen (yellow card) 56'; Chaïbi 85'	Stadium: Parc des Sports; Attendance: 13,620; Referee: Jérémy Stinat
