= 2023–24 FC Annecy season =

FC Annecy
2023–24 season
- Head coach: Laurent Guyot
- Stadium: Parc des Sports
- Ligue 2: 14th
- Coupe de France: Eighth round
- Top goalscorer: League: Samuel Ntamack (9); All: Samuel Ntamack (9)

The 2023–24 season was FC Annecy's 59th season in existence and second consecutive in the Ligue 2. They also competed in the Coupe de France.

== Players ==
=== First-team squad ===
As of 23 August 2023.

Note: Flags indicate national team as defined under FIFA eligibility rules; some limited exceptions apply. Players may hold more than one non-FIFA nationality.

| No. | Pos. | Nation | Player |
|---|---|---|---|
| 1 | GK | FRA | Florian Escales |
| 2 | DF | FRA | Hamjatou Soukouna |
| 3 | DF | CMR | Moïse Mahop |
| 4 | DF | CIV | Michel Junior Diaz (on loan from FC Nantes) |
| 5 | MF | ALG | Ahmed Kashi |
| 6 | DF | FRA | François Lajugie |
| 8 | DF | FRA | Jonathan Goncalves |
| 9 | FW | FRA | Romain Spano |
| 10 | FW | MAD | Warren Caddy (on loan from Paris FC) |
| 11 | FW | BEN | Goteh Ntignee (on loan from Cavalry FC) |
| 12 | FW | FRA | Kévin Testud |
| 13 | DF | FRA | Gaby Jean |
| 14 | DF | FRA | Kévin Mouanga |
| 16 | GK | FRA | Thomas Callens |

| No. | Pos. | Nation | Player |
|---|---|---|---|
| 17 | MF | FRA | Vincent Pajot |
| 18 | MF | MAR | Nordine Kandil (on loan from Strasbourg) |
| 19 | FW | FRA | Samuel Ntamack |
| 20 | MF | FRA | Yacouba Barry |
| 21 | MF | FRA | Martin Adeline |
| 22 | FW | FRA | Clément Billemaz |
| 23 | FW | FRA | Alexy Bosetti |
| 24 | FW | CIV | Jonathan Kodjia |
| 27 | FW | FRA | Steve Shamal |
| 28 | FW | FRA | Antoine Larouse |
| 29 | FW | FRA | Zakaria Bengueddoudjj |
| 30 | GK | FRA | Tidiane Malbec |
| 41 | DF | FRA | Thibaut Delphis |

== Transfers ==
=== In ===
| Pos. | Player | Transferred from | Fee | Date | Source |
|---|---|---|---|---|---|
| DF | (France) Hamjatou Soukouna | (France) Sedan | Free | 19 July 2023 | |
| MF | (Morocco) Nordine Kandil | (France) Strasbourg | Loan | 9 August 2023 | |
| MF | (France) Martin Adeline | (France) Reims | Loan | 10 August 2023 | |
| FW | (Madagascar) Warren Caddy | (France) Paris FC | Loan | 16 August 2023 | |
| FW | (Ivory Coast) Jonathan Kodjia | Unattached | Free | 22 August 2023 | |

=== Out ===
| Pos. | Player | Transferred to | Fee | Date | Source |

== Pre-season and friendlies ==
Win Draw Loss

== Competitions ==
=== Overall record ===
| Competition | First match | Last match | Starting round | Final position | Record | | | | | | | |
| Competition | First match | Last match | Starting round | Final position | Pld | W | D | L | GF | GA | GD | Win % |
|---|---|---|---|---|---|---|---|---|---|---|---|---|
| Ligue 2 | 5 August 2023 | 17 May 2024 | Matchday 1 | 14th | 38 | 12 | 10 | 16 | 49 | 50 | −1 | 31.58 |
| Coupe de France | 18 November 2023 | 9 December 2023 | Seventh round | Eighth round | 2 | 1 | 0 | 1 | 3 | 3 | +0 | 50.00 |
| Total | | | | | 40 | 13 | 10 | 17 | 52 | 53 | −1 | 32.50 |

Source: Soccerway

=== Ligue 2 ===
==== League table ====
| Pos | Team | Pld | W | D | L | GF | GA | GD | Pts | Promotion or Relegation |
|---|---|---|---|---|---|---|---|---|---|---|
| 12 | Bordeaux (D, R) | 38 | 14 | 9 | 15 | 50 | 52 | −2 | 50 (Note: Bordeaux were deducted 1 point due to federation decision.) | Demoted to National 2 |
| 13 | Bastia | 38 | 14 | 9 | 15 | 44 | 48 | −4 | 50 (Note: Bastia were deducted 1 point due to federation decision.) | |
| 14 | Annecy | 38 | 12 | 10 | 16 | 49 | 50 | −1 | 46 | |
| 15 | Ajaccio | 38 | 12 | 10 | 16 | 35 | 46 | −11 | 46 | |
| 16 | Dunkerque | 38 | 12 | 10 | 16 | 36 | 52 | −16 | 46 | |

Updated to match(es) played on 17 May 2024. Source: Ligue 2
Rules for classification: 1) Points; 2) Goal difference; 3) Number of goals scored; 4) Head-to-head goal difference; 5) Fair play points
(D) Disqualified; (R) Relegated

==== Results summary ====
| Overall | | | | | | | | Home | | | | | | Away | | | | | |
| Pld | W | D | L | GF | GA | GD | Pts | W | D | L | GF | GA | GD | W | D | L | GF | GA | GD |
|---|---|---|---|---|---|---|---|---|---|---|---|---|---|---|---|---|---|---|---|
| 38 | 12 | 10 | 16 | 49 | 50 | −1 | 46 | 5 | 6 | 8 | 22 | 27 | −5 | 7 | 4 | 8 | 27 | 23 | +4 |

Source: Ligue 2

==== Results by round ====
| Round | 1 | 2 | 3 | 4 | 5 | 6 | 7 | 8 | 9 | 10 | 11 | 12 | 13 | 14 | 15 | 16 | 17 |
|---|---|---|---|---|---|---|---|---|---|---|---|---|---|---|---|---|---|
| Ground | H | A | H | H | A | H | A | A | H | A | H | A | H | A | H | A | H |
| Result | L | D | W | D | D | D | W | L | D | L | D | W | L | L | W | D | |
| Position | 19 | 16 | 11 | 11 | 11 | 14 | 10 | 11 | 12 | 12 | 12 | 12 | 13 | 15 | 12 | | |

Source: Ligue 2
A = Away; H = Home; W = Win; D = Draw; L = Loss

==== Matches ====
The league fixtures were unveiled on 29 June 2023.

| 5 August 2023 1 | Annecy | 1–4 | Guingamp | Annecy |
| 19:00 CET (UTC+1) | | Report | | Stadium: Parc des Sports; Referee: Olivier Thual |

| 6 December 2023 17 | Annecy | v | Caen | Annecy |
| 20:45 CET (UTC+1) | | | | Stadium: Parc des Sports |

| 16 December 2023 18 | Grenoble | v | Annecy | Grenoble |
| 19:00 CET (UTC+1) | | | | Stadium: Stade des Alpes |

| 16 December 2023 19 | Annecy | v | Rodez | Annecy |
| 20:45 CET (UTC+1) | | | | Stadium: Parc des Sports |

=== Coupe de France ===
| 18 November 2023 Seventh round | ES Fosséenne | 1–2 | Annecy | Fos-sur-Mer |
| 17:00 CET (UTC+1) | | Report | | Stadium: Stade Parsemain |

| 9 December 2023 Eighth round | Thionville | v | Annecy | Troyes |
| 17:00 CET (UTC+1) | | | | Stadium: Stade de l'Aube |
