= 2022–23 Olympique de Marseille season =

Olympique de Marseille
2022–23 season
- President: Pablo Longoria
- Head coach: Igor Tudor
- Stadium: Stade Vélodrome
- Ligue 1: 3rd
- Coupe de France: Quarter-finals
- UEFA Champions League: Group stage
- Top goalscorer: League: Alexis Sánchez (14); All: Alexis Sánchez (18)
Home colours	Away colours	Third colours

The 2022–23 season was the 117th season in the history of Olympique de Marseille and their 27th consecutive season in the top flight. The club participated in Ligue 1, the Coupe de France and the UEFA Champions League. The season covers the period from 1 July 2022 to 30 June 2023.

== Players ==
=== First-team squad ===
As of 31 January 2023

Note: Flags indicate national team as defined under FIFA eligibility rules; some limited exceptions apply. Players may hold more than one non-FIFA nationality.

No.	Pos.	Nation	Player
1	GK	CMR	Simon Ngapandouetnbu
3	DF	CIV	Eric Bailly (on loan from Manchester United)
4	DF	FRA	Samuel Gigot
5	DF	ARG	Leonardo Balerdi
6	MF	FRA	Matteo Guendouzi (3rd captain)
7	DF	FRA	Jonathan Clauss
8	MF	MAR	Azzedine Ounahi
9	FW	POR	Vitinha
10	MF	FRA	Dimitri Payet (captain)
16	GK	ESP	Pau López
17	FW	TUR	Cengiz Ünder

No.	Pos.	Nation	Player
18	MF	UKR	Ruslan Malinovskyi (on loan from Atalanta)
21	MF	FRA	Valentin Rongier (vice-captain)
23	DF	BIH	Sead Kolašinac
27	MF	FRA	Jordan Veretout
29	DF	BFA	Issa Kaboré (on loan from Manchester City)
30	DF	POR	Nuno Tavares (on loan from Arsenal)
36	GK	ESP	Rubén Blanco (on loan from Celta Vigo)
70	FW	CHI	Alexis Sánchez
77	MF	MAR	Amine Harit
99	DF	COD	Chancel Mbemba

=== Out on loan ===
Note: Flags indicate national team as defined under FIFA eligibility rules; some limited exceptions apply. Players may hold more than one non-FIFA nationality.

No.	Pos.	Nation	Player
—	DF	FRA	Jordan Amavi (on loan to Getafe until 30 June 2023)
—	DF	ESP	Pol Lirola (on loan to Elche until 30 June 2023)
—	DF	FRA	Isaak Touré (on loan to Auxerre until 30 June 2023)
—	MF	SEN	Pape Gueye (on loan to Sevilla until 30 June 2023)
—	FW	USA	Konrad de la Fuente (on loan to Olympiacos until 30 June 2023)
—	MF	NED	Kevin Strootman (on loan to Genoa until 30 June 2023)

No.	Pos.	Nation	Player
—	FW	FRA	Salim Ben Seghir (on loan to Valenciennes until 30 June 2023)
—	FW	BRA	Luis Henrique (on loan to Botafogo until 30 June 2023)
—	FW	POL	Arkadiusz Milik (on loan to Juventus until 30 June 2023)
—	FW	SRB	Nemanja Radonjić (on loan to Torino until 30 June 2023)
—	FW	COL	Luis Suárez (on loan to Almería until 30 June 2023)

== Transfers ==
=== In ===
No.	Pos.	Player	Transferred from	Fee	Date	Source
19	DF	(France) Jordan Amavi	(France) Nice	Loan return	30 June 2022	
32	DF	(France) Lucas Perrin	(France) Strasbourg	Loan return	30 June 2022	
	MF	(Serbia) Nemanja Radonjić	(Portugal) Benfica	Loan return	30 June 2022	
	MF	(Netherlands) Kevin Strootman	(Italy) Cagliari	Loan return	30 June 2022	
16	GK	(Spain) Pau López	(Italy) Roma	€12M	1 July 2022	
6	MF	(France) Matteo Guendouzi	(England) Arsenal	€10.5M	1 July 2022	
17	FW	(Turkey) Cengiz Ünder	(Italy) Roma	€10.5M	1 July 2022	
9	FW	(Poland) Arkadiusz Milik	(Italy) Napoli	€9M	1 July 2022	
4	DF	(France) Samuel Gigot	(Russia) Spartak Moscow	€0.5M	1 July 2022	
18	DF	(France) Isaak Touré	(France) Le Havre	€5.5M	1 July 2022	
99	DF	(Democratic Republic of the Congo) Chancel Mbemba	(Portugal) Porto	Free	15 July 2022	
7	DF	(France) Jonathan Clauss	(France) Lens	€7.5M	20 July 2022	
36	GK	(Spain) Rubén Blanco	(Spain) Celta Vigo	Loan	20 July 2022	
11	FW	(Colombia) Luis Suárez	(Spain) Granada	€10M	20 July 2022	
30	DF	(Portugal) Nuno Tavares	(England) Arsenal	Loan	23 July 2022	
27	MF	(France) Jordan Veretout	(Italy) Roma	€11M	5 August 2022	
70	FW	(Chile) Alexis Sánchez	(Italy) Inter Milan	Free	10 August 2022	
29	DF	(Burkina Faso) Issa Kaboré	(England) Manchester City	Loan (Note: Includes an option to sign permanently for €20 million.)	17 August 2022	
3	DF	(Ivory Coast) Eric Bailly	(England) Manchester United	Loan (Note: Includes an option to sign permanently.)	24 August 2022	
77	MF	(Morocco) Amine Harit	(Germany) Schalke 04	Loan (Note: Includes an option to sign permanently.)	1 September 2022	
77	MF	(Morocco) Amine Harit	(Germany) Schalke 04	€5M (Note: Obligation-to-buy clause was triggered.)	7 November 2022	
18	MF	(Ukraine) Ruslan Malinovskyi	(Italy) Atalanta	Loan (Note: Includes an obligation to sign permanently for €10–13 million.)	9 January 2023	
8	MF	(Morocco) Azzedine Ounahi	(France) Angers	€10M (Note: Fee includes €2 million in bonuses.)	29 January 2023	
9	FW	(Portugal) Vitinha	(Portugal) Braga	€32M	31 January 2023	

Total expenditure: ▼€123.5 million (excluding any other fees)

=== Out ===
No.	Pos.	Player	Transferred to	Fee	Date	Source
7	MF	(Morocco) Amine Harit	(Germany) Schalke 04	Loan return	30 June 2022	
6	MF	(France) Matteo Guendouzi	(England) Arsenal	Loan return	30 June 2022	
17	FW	(Turkey) Cengiz Ünder	(Italy) Roma	Loan return	30 June 2022	
9	FW	(Poland) Arkadiusz Milik	(Italy) Napoli	Loan return	30 June 2022	
2	DF	(France) William Saliba	(England) Arsenal	Loan return	30 June 2022	
16	GK	(Spain) Pau López	(Italy) Roma	Loan return	30 June 2022	
4	MF	(France) Boubacar Kamara	(England) Aston Villa	Free	1 July 2022	
32	DF	(France) Lucas Perrin	(France) Strasbourg	€1.5M	1 July 2022	
30	GK	(France) Steve Mandanda	(France) Rennes	Free	6 July 2022	
	MF	(Serbia) Nemanja Radonjić	(Italy) Torino	Loan (Note: Includes a conditional obligation to buy.)	7 July 2022	
11	FW	(Brazil) Luis Henrique	(Brazil) Botafogo	Loan (Note: Includes an option to sign permanently.)	22 July 2022	
14	DF	(Brazil) Luan Peres	(Turkey) Fenerbahçe	€5.23M	29 July 2022	
26	MF	(Morocco) Oussama Targhalline	(Turkey) Alanyaspor	Loan	1 August 2022	
3	DF	(Spain) Álvaro	Released (Note: On 29 August 2022, Álvaro joined Al Nassr.)	Free	1 August 2022	
20	MF	(United States) Konrad de la Fuente	(Greece) Olympiacos	Loan	13 August 2022	
29	DF	(Spain) Pol Lirola	(Spain) Elche	Loan (Note: Includes an option to sign permanently.)	12 August 2022	
	MF	(Netherlands) Kevin Strootman	(Italy) Genoa	Loan	24 August 2022	
9	FW	(Poland) Arkadiusz Milik	(Italy) Juventus	€0.9M (Note: On loan until June 2023 with option to buy for €7 million + €2.8 million variables.)	26 August 2022	
19	DF	(France) Jordan Amavi	(Spain) Getafe	Loan	1 September 2022	
15	DF	(Croatia) Duje Ćaleta-Car	(England) Southampton	€10M	1 September 2022	
13	FW	(Democratic Republic of the Congo) Cédric Bakambu	(Greece) Olympiacos	Undisclosed	16 September 2022	
11	FW	(Colombia) Luis Suárez	(Spain) Almería	Loan (Note: On loan until June 2023 with obligation to buy for €8 million.)	5 December 2022	
12	FW	(Senegal) Bamba Dieng	(France) Lorient	€7M	28 January 2023	

Total income: ▲€24.63 million (excluding potential add-ons, bonuses and undisclosed figures)

== Pre-season and friendlies ==
Win Draw Loss Fixtures

13 July 2022 Friendly	Marseille	4–1	Marignane Gignac	Angleur, Belgium
19:00 CEST (UTC+2)	Bakambu 27'; Dieng 53', 83', 90+1'	Report	Nagui 48'	Stadium: SL16 Football Campus

16 July 2022 Friendly	Marseille	0–3	Norwich City	Fos-sur-Mer, France
18:00 CEST (UTC+2)		Report	Sørensen 9'; Rashica (yellow card) 41'; Hugill 60', 86', (yellow card) 49'	Stadium: Stade Parsemain

22 July 2022 Friendly	Middlesbrough	2–0	Marseille	Middlesbrough, England
19:00 BST (UTC+1)	Jones 51'; Tavernier 72'	Report		Stadium: Riverside Stadium

27 July 2022 Friendly	Real Betis	1–1	Marseille	Chesterfield, England
19:30 BST (UTC+1)	Miranda (yellow card) 27'; Rodri 90'; Joaquín (yellow card) 90+3'	Report	Touré (yellow card) 18'; Milik 87'; Guendouzi (yellow card) 90+3'	Stadium: Technique Stadium

31 July 2022 Friendly	Marseille	0–2	Milan	Marseille, France
18:00 CEST (UTC+2)	Guendouzi (yellow card) 40'; Touré (yellow card) 77' (yellow-red card) 78'	Report	Messias 11'; Giroud 28'; Rebić (yellow card) 40'; Tonali (yellow card) 53'	Stadium: Stade Vélodrome; Referee: Mathieu Vernice (France)

11 December 2022 Friendly	Sassuolo	3–2	Marseille	Marbella, Spain
16:00 CET (UTC+1)	Berardi 26'; Pinamonti 66'; Thorstvedt 90+2'	Report	Sánchez 10'; Balerdi (red card) 34'; Payet 56'	Stadium: Marbella Football Center; Attendance: 0

== Competitions ==
=== Overall record ===
Competition	First match	Last match	Starting round	Final position	Record							
Competition	First match	Last match	Starting round	Final position	Pld	W	D	L	GF	GA	GD	Win %
Ligue 1	7 August 2022	3 June 2023	Matchday 1	3rd	38	22	7	9	67	40	+27	57.89
Coupe de France	7 January 2023	1 March 2023	Round of 64	Quarter-finals	4	3	1	0	7	3	+4	75.00
UEFA Champions League	7 September 2022	1 November 2022	Group stage	Group stage	6	2	0	4	8	8	+0	33.33
Total					48	27	8	13	82	51	+31	56.25

Source: Soccerway

=== Ligue 1 ===
==== League table ====
Pos	Team	Pld	W	D	L	GF	GA	GD	Pts	Qualification or relegation
1	Paris Saint-Germain (C)	38	27	4	7	89	40	+49	85	Qualification for the Champions League group stage
2	Lens	38	25	9	4	68	29	+39	84	Qualification for the Champions League group stage
3	Marseille	38	22	7	9	67	40	+27	73	Qualification for the Champions League third qualifying round
4	Rennes	38	21	5	12	69	39	+30	68	Qualification for the Europa League group stage
5	Lille	38	19	10	9	65	44	+21	67	Qualification for the Europa Conference League play-off round

Source: Ligue 1
Rules for classification: 1) Points; 2) Goal difference; 3) Head-to-head points; 4) Head-to-head goal difference; 5) Head-to-head goals scored; 6) Head-to-head away goals scored; 7) Goals scored; 8) Away goals scored; 9) Fair-play points (Note: Head-to-head record is used only after all the matches between the teams in question have been played).
(C) Champions

==== Results summary ====
Overall								Home						Away					
Pld	W	D	L	GF	GA	GD	Pts	W	D	L	GF	GA	GD	W	D	L	GF	GA	GD
38	22	7	9	67	40	+27	73	10	4	5	35	24	+11	12	3	4	32	16	+16

Source: Ligue 1

==== Results by round ====
Round	1	2	3	4	5	6	7	8	9	10	11	12	13	14	15	16	17	18	19	20	21	22	23	24	25	26	27	28	29	30	31	32	33	34	35	36	37	38
Ground	H	A	H	A	H	A	H	H	A	H	A	H	A	H	A	H	A	A	H	H	A	H	A	A	H	A	H	A	H	A	H	A	H	A	H	A	H	A
Result	W	D	W	W	W	W	W	D	W	L	L	L	D	W	W	W	W	W	W	D	W	L	W	W	L	W	D	W	D	D	W	W	W	L	W	L	L	L
Position	2	3	3	2	3	2	2	2	2	3	4	5	5	4	4	3	3	3	3	3	2	2	2	2	2	2	2	2	3	3	2	2	2	3	3	3	3	3

Source: Ligue 1
A = Away; H = Home; W = Win; D = Draw; L = Loss

==== Matches ====
The league fixtures were announced on 17 June 2022.

7 August 2022 1	Marseille	4–1	Reims	Marseille
20:45 CEST (UTC+2)	Faes 13' (o.g.); Tavares 45+1'; Gigot (yellow card) 59'; Suárez 76', 90+4'	Report	Balogun 84'	Stadium: Stade Vélodrome; Attendance: 62,738; Referee: Jérôme Brisard

14 August 2022 2	Brest	1–1	Marseille	Brest
20:45 CEST (UTC+2)	Belaïli (yellow card) 51'; Lees-Melou 61'	Report	Milik (yellow card) 18'; Tavares 38'; Gerson (yellow card) 57'; Rongier (yellow card) 65'; Guendouzi (yellow card) 73'	Stadium: Stade Francis-Le Blé; Attendance: 13,709; Referee: Jérémy Stinat

20 August 2022 3	Marseille	2–1	Nantes	Marseille
21:00 CEST (UTC+2)	Rongier (yellow card) 53'; Gigot (yellow card) 60' (yellow-red card) 76'; Mbemba 70'; López (yellow card) 76'; Pallois 82' (o.g.); Veretout (yellow card) 90+4'	Report	Guessand (yellow card) 59'; Blas 78' (pen.)	Stadium: Stade Vélodrome; Attendance: 63,147; Referee: Jérémie Pignard

28 August 2022 4	Nice	0–3	Marseille	Nice
15:00 CEST (UTC+2)	Beka Beka (yellow card) 56'	Report	Sánchez 9', 41'; Tavares 36', (yellow card) 70'	Stadium: Allianz Riviera; Attendance: 31,418; Referee: François Letexier

31 August 2022 5	Marseille	1–0	Clermont	Marseille
21:00 CEST (UTC+2)	Rongier (yellow card) 44'; Gueye 49'; Sánchez (penalty missed) 87'; Bailly (yellow card) 90+2'	Report	Andrić (yellow card) 37'; Seidu (yellow card) 64'	Stadium: Stade Vélodrome; Attendance: 62,763; Referee: Eric Wattellier

3 September 2022 6	Auxerre	0–2	Marseille	Auxerre
17:00 CEST (UTC+2)	Jubal (yellow card) 39'	Report	Gerson 8'; Sánchez 84'; Harit (yellow card) 90'	Stadium: Stade de l'Abbé-Deschamps; Attendance: 17,025; Referee: Willy Delajod

10 September 2022 7	Marseille	2–1	Lille	Marseille
21:00 CEST (UTC+2)	Balerdi (yellow card) 14'; Sánchez 26'; Gueye (yellow card) 50'; Gigot (yellow card) 57', (goal) 61'; Touré (yellow card) 68'; Tavares (yellow card) 72'	Report	Ismaily 12'; Djaló (yellow card) 78'	Stadium: Stade Vélodrome; Attendance: 62,985; Referee: Benoît Millot

18 September 2022 8	Marseille	1–1	Rennes	Marseille
15:00 CEST (UTC+2)	Guendouzi 52'; Tavares (yellow card) 62'; Balerdi (yellow card) 85'; Suárez (yellow card) 90'	Report	Traoré (yellow card) 7'; Doué (yellow card) 19'; Guendouzi 25' (o.g.); Gouiri (yellow card) 44'; Sulemana (yellow card) 68'	Stadium: Stade Vélodrome; Attendance: 62,753; Referee: Benoît Bastien

30 September 2022 9	Angers	0–3	Marseille	Angers
21:00 CEST (UTC+2)		Report	Clauss 35'; Suárez 50'; Gerson 59'	Stadium: Stade Raymond Kopa; Attendance: 19,000; Referee: Johan Hamel

8 October 2022 10	Marseille	1–2	Ajaccio	Marseille
17:00 CEST (UTC+2)	Payet 15' (pen.)	Report	Koné (yellow card) 11'; Moussiti-Oko 25'; Balerdi 47' (o.g.); Gonzalez (yellow card) 86'	Stadium: Stade Vélodrome; Attendance: 63,312; Referee: Willy Delajod

16 October 2022 11	Paris Saint-Germain	1–0	Marseille	Paris
20:45 CEST (UTC+2)	Neymar 45+2'; Marquinhos (yellow card) 73'	Report	Gigot (red card) 72'	Stadium: Parc des Princes; Attendance: 47,000; Referee: Clément Turpin

22 October 2022 12	Marseille	0–1	Lens	Marseille
21:00 CEST (UTC+2)	Kolašinac (yellow card) 14'; Rongier (yellow card) 23'; Guendouzi (yellow card) 64'	Report	Sotoca (yellow card) 34'; Onana (yellow card) 38'; Haidara (yellow card) 50'; Costa 78'	Stadium: Stade Vélodrome; Attendance: 56,414; Referee: Benoît Millot

29 October 2022 13	Strasbourg	2–2	Marseille	Strasbourg
21:00 CEST (UTC+2)	Mothiba 76'; Gameiro 90+3'	Report	Dieng 8', (yellow card) 52'; Kaboré 35'; Tavares (yellow card) 70'	Stadium: Stade de la Meinau; Attendance: 25,687; Referee: Ruddy Buquet

6 November 2022 14	Marseille	1–0	Lyon	Marseille
20:45 CET (UTC+1)	Gigot 44'	Report	Tetê (yellow card) 90'	Stadium: Stade Vélodrome; Attendance: 62,975; Referee: François Letexier

13 November 2022 15	Monaco	2–3	Marseille	Monaco
20:45 CET (UTC+1)	Ben Yedder 45' (pen.); Volland 72'; Embolo (yellow card) 82'; Disasi (yellow card) 85'; Fofana (yellow card) 90+5'	Report	Sánchez 35', (yellow card) 78'; Veretout 83'; Kolašinac 90+8'	Stadium: Stade Louis II; Attendance: 10,631; Referee: Benoît Bastien

29 December 2022 16	Marseille	6–1	Toulouse	Marseille
21:00 CET (UTC+1)	Rongier 12'; Nicolaisen 40' (o.g.); Kolašinac 51'; Payet 61'; Clauss (yellow card) 64'; Ünder 79' (pen.); Tavares 81'	Report	Van den Boomen 65' (pen.), (yellow card) 81'; Mawissa (yellow card) 78'	Stadium: Stade Vélodrome; Attendance: 62,556; Referee: Jérémie Pignard

2 January 2023 17	Montpellier	1–2	Marseille	Montpellier
19:00 CET (UTC+1)	Ferri (yellow card) 51'; Jullien (yellow card) 85'; Savanier 90' (pen.)	Report	Mbemba (yellow card) 6'; Tavares 46', (red card) 86'; Estève 60' (o.g.); López (yellow card) 89'	Stadium: Stade de la Mosson; Attendance: 18,971; Referee: Ruddy Buquet

11 January 2023 18	Troyes	0–2	Marseille	Troyes
21:00 CET (UTC+1)	Kouamé (yellow card) 48'; Ripart (yellow card) 73'	Report	Mbemba 10', (yellow card) 54'; Kaboré (yellow card) 14'; Veretout 46'; Malinovskyi (yellow card) 67'	Stadium: Stade de l'Aube; Attendance: 14,222; Referee: Hakim Ben El Hadj

14 January 2023 19	Marseille	3–1	Lorient	Marseille
19:00 CET (UTC+1)	Kolašinac 38'; Ünder (yellow card) 50'; Sánchez 53'; Veretout 59'	Report	Moffi 29'	Stadium: Stade Vélodrome; Attendance: 63,276; Referee: Bastien Dechepy

28 January 2023 20	Marseille	1–1	Monaco	Marseille
21:00 CET (UTC+1)	Sánchez 47'; Veretout (yellow card) 66'; Rongier (yellow card) 85'	Report	Veretout 17' (o.g.); Diatta (yellow card) 54'; Golovin (yellow card) 90+3'	Stadium: Stade Vélodrome; Attendance: 64,502; Referee: Jérémie Pignard

1 February 2023 21	Nantes	0–2	Marseille	Nantes
19:00 CET (UTC+1)	Traoré (yellow card) 12'; Mollet (yellow card) 26'; Centonze (yellow card) 45'; Simon (yellow card) 66'	Report	Malinovskyi (yellow card) 16'; João Victor 56' (o.g.); Balerdi (yellow card) 78'; López (yellow card) 86'; Ounahi 90+2'	Stadium: Stade de la Beaujoire; Attendance: 34,125; Referee: Willy Delajod

5 February 2023 22	Marseille	1–3	Nice	Marseille
20:45 CET (UTC+1)	Malinovskyi 60'	Report	Diop 38'; Laborde 44'; Ndayishimiye (yellow card) 59'; Brahimi 85'	Stadium: Stade Vélodrome; Attendance: 65,234; Referee: Clément Turpin

11 February 2023 23	Clermont	0–2	Marseille	Clermont-Ferrand
21:00 CET (UTC+1)	Magnin (yellow card) 35'; Cham (yellow card) 43'; Wieteska (yellow card) 44'; Allevinah (yellow card) 52'	Report	Balerdi (yellow card) 25'; Sánchez 44' (pen.), 81', (yellow card) 68'; Ünder (yellow card) 84'	Stadium: Stade Gabriel Montpied; Attendance: 13,576; Referee: Ruddy Buquet

19 February 2023 24	Toulouse	2–3	Marseille	Nantes
20:45 CET (UTC+1)	Dallinga 3'; Onaiwu 87'	Report	Mbemba 52'; Ünder (yellow card) 54', (goal) 59'; Kolašinac (yellow card) 76'; Tavares 78'	Stadium: Stade de la Beaujoire; Attendance: 29,218; Referee: Stéphanie Frappart

26 February 2023 25	Marseille	0–3	Paris Saint-Germain	Marseille
20:45 CET (UTC+1)		Report	Mbappé 25', 55'; Messi 29'	Stadium: Stade Vélodrome; Attendance: 65,894; Referee: Clément Turpin

5 March 2023 26	Rennes	0–1	Marseille	Rennes
20:45 CET (UTC+1)	D. Doué (yellow card) 66'	Report	Kolašinac 57'; Balerdi (yellow card) 90+1'	Stadium: Roazhon Park; Attendance: 28,515; Referee: Eric Wattellier

12 March 2023 27	Marseille	2–2	Strasbourg	Marseille
20:45 CET (UTC+1)	Balerdi (red card) 28'; Mbemba 48'; Sánchez 75' (pen.)	Report	Delaine (yellow card) 5'; Nyamsi (yellow card) 39'; Djiku (yellow card) 71'; Sobol (yellow card) 82'; Aholou 87', 88'	Stadium: Stade Vélodrome; Attendance: 63,380; Referee: Jérémie Pignard

19 March 2023 28	Reims	1–2	Marseille	Reims
20:45 CET (UTC+1)	Balogun 13'; De Smet (yellow card) 14'; Agbadou (yellow card) 90+1'	Report	Guendouzi (yellow card) 14'; Sánchez 16', 29'; Malinovskyi (yellow card) 19'; Rongier (yellow card) 69'	Stadium: Stade Auguste-Delaune; Attendance: 20,479; Referee: François Letexier

31 March 2023 29	Marseille	1–1	Montpellier	Marseille
21:00 CEST (UTC+2)	Guendouzi 44' (pen.); Veretout (yellow card) 45+6'; Gigot (yellow card) 82'	Report	Nordin 12'; Sakho (yellow card) 42'; Germain (yellow card) 81'	Stadium: Stade Vélodrome; Attendance: 58,231; Referee: Thomas Léonard

9 April 2023 30	Lorient	0–0	Marseille	Lorient
20:45 CEST (UTC+2)		Report	Malinovskyi (yellow card) 83'; Balerdi (yellow card) 86'	Stadium: Stade du Moustoir; Attendance: 16,767; Referee: Willy Delajod

16 April 2023 31	Marseille	3–1	Troyes	Marseille
20:45 CEST (UTC+2)	Vitinha 1', 63'; Ünder 39'; Malinovskyi (yellow card) 83'; Balerdi (yellow card) 86'	Report	Agoumé (yellow card) 54'; Kouamé (yellow card) 59'; M. Baldé 90'	Stadium: Stade Vélodrome; Attendance: 63,486; Referee: Benoît Millot

23 April 2023 32	Lyon	1–2	Marseille	Décines-Charpieu
20:45 CEST (UTC+2)	Diomandé (yellow card) 29'; Tolisso (yellow card) 55'; Lacazette 67'	Report	Ünder 43'; Kolašinac (yellow card) 54'; Gusto 90+1' (o.g.)	Stadium: Groupama Stadium; Attendance: 57,709; Referee: Jérôme Brisard

30 April 2023 33	Marseille	2–1	Auxerre	Marseille
20:45 CEST (UTC+2)	Sánchez (yellow card) 40', (goal) 76'; Ünder 74'	Report	B. Touré 32'	Stadium: Stade Vélodrome; Attendance: 64,523; Referee: Jérémie Pignard

6 May 2023 34	Lens	2–1	Marseille	Lens
21:00 CEST (UTC+2)	Onana (yellow card) 11'; Medina (yellow card) 24'; Fofana 42'; Frankowski (yellow card) 45+1'; Openda 60'; Gradit (yellow card) 63'; Samba (yellow card) 89'	Report	Rongier (yellow card) 45+3'; Tavares (yellow card) 63'; Payet 88'	Stadium: Stade Félix-Bollaert; Attendance: 38,220; Referee: Clément Turpin

14 May 2023 35	Marseille	3–1	Angers	Marseille
20:45 CEST (UTC+2)	Sánchez 34'; Payet 48'; Veretout 77' (pen.); Tavares (yellow card) 85'	Report	Niane (yellow card) 19'; Sima 28'; Bentaleb (yellow card) 33'	Stadium: Stade Vélodrome; Attendance: 63,329; Referee: Benoît Millot

20 May 2023 36	Lille	2–1	Marseille	Villeneuve-d'Ascq
21:00 CEST (UTC+2)	David 50' (pen.); André (yellow card) 57'; Bamba 72', (yellow card) 73'; Bayo (yellow card) 85'	Report	Clauss 29'; Balerdi (yellow card) 37'; Rongier (yellow card) 55'	Stadium: Stade Pierre-Mauroy; Attendance: 47,399; Referee: Jérôme Brisard

27 May 2023 37	Marseille	1–2	Brest	Marseille
21:00 CEST (UTC+2)	Veretout (yellow card) 63'; Mbemba 75'; Balerdi (yellow card) 87'; Lala (yellow card) 90+2'	Report	Magnetti 57'; Chardonnet (yellow card) 67'; Camara 81'	Stadium: Stade Vélodrome; Attendance: 61,732; Referee: Stéphanie Frappart

3 June 2023 38	Ajaccio	1–0	Marseille	Ajaccio
21:00 CEST (UTC+2)	Vidal 88'; Soumano (yellow card) 90+4'	Report	Balerdi (yellow card) 21'	Stadium: Stade François Coty; Attendance: 9,500; Referee: Benoît Bastien

=== Coupe de France ===
7 January 2023 Round of 64	Hyères	0–2	Marseille	Martigues
15:30 CET (UTC+1)		Report	Balerdi (yellow card) 4'; Bailly (red card) 15'; Sánchez 45+1' (pen.); Dieng 70'	Stadium: Stade France-Turcan; Attendance: 8,000; Referee: Jérémy Stinat

20 January 2023 Round of 32	Marseille	1–0	Rennes	Marseille
21:10 CET (UTC+1)	Balerdi (yellow card) 45+1'; Guendouzi 59'	Report	Wooh (yellow card) 8'; Traoré (yellow card) 73'	Stadium: Stade Vélodrome; Attendance: 57,103; Referee: Stéphanie Frappart

8 February 2023 Round of 16	Marseille	2–1	Paris Saint-Germain	Marseille
21:10 CET (UTC+1)	Sánchez 31' (pen.); Guendouzi (yellow card) 48'; Mbemba (yellow card) 49'; Malinovskyi 57'	Report	Ramos 45+2'; Mendes (yellow card) 64'	Stadium: Stade Vélodrome; Attendance: 65,329; Referee: François Letexier

1 March 2023 Quarter-finals	Marseille	2–2 (6–7 p)	Annecy	Marseille
21:00 CET (UTC+1)	Veretout 29'; Sánchez (penalty missed) 85'; Mughe 90+6'	Report	Sahi 53'; Mouanga 59'	Stadium: Stade Vélodrome; Attendance: 63,929; Referee: Benoît Bastien
	Penalties
	Guendouzi (penalty scored); Sánchez (penalty scored); Tavares (penalty missed); Clauss (penalty scored); Ounahi (penalty scored); Vitinha (penalty scored); Rongier (penalty scored); Balerdi (penalty missed)		(penalty missed) Kashi; (penalty scored) Demoncy; (penalty scored) Mouanga; (penalty scored) Baldé; (penalty scored) Jean; (penalty scored) El Jaouhari; (penalty scored) Shamal; (penalty scored) Lajugie

=== UEFA Champions League ===
==== Group stage ====
The draw for the group stage was held on 25 August 2022.

Pos	Team	Pld	W	D	L	GF	GA	GD	Pts	Qualification	TOT	FRA	SPO	MAR
1	(England) Tottenham Hotspur	6	3	2	1	8	6	+2	11	Advance to knockout phase	—	3–2	1–1	2–0
2	(Germany) Eintracht Frankfurt	6	3	1	2	7	8	−1	10	Advance to knockout phase	0–0	—	0–3	2–1
3	(Portugal) Sporting CP	6	2	1	3	8	9	−1	7	Transfer to Europa League	2–0	1–2	—	0–2
4	(France) Marseille	6	2	0	4	8	8	0	6		1–2	0–1	4–1	—

Source: UEFA
Rules for classification: Group stage tiebreakers

7 September 2022 1	Tottenham Hotspur (England)	2–0	(France) Marseille	London, England
20:00 BST (UTC+1)	Dier (yellow card) 53'; Son (yellow card) 65'; Richarlison 76', 81'	Report	Mbemba (red card) 48'; Bailly (yellow card) 48'; Clauss (yellow card) 72'	Stadium: Tottenham Hotspur Stadium; Attendance: 57,367; Referee: Slavko Vinčić (Slovenia)

13 September 2022 2	Marseille (France)	0–1	(Germany) Eintracht Frankfurt	Marseille, France
21:00 CEST (UTC+2)	Ünder (yellow card) 82'	Report	Hasebe (yellow card) 37'; Lindstrøm 43'	Stadium: Stade Vélodrome; Attendance: 62,500; Referee: José María Sánchez Martínez (Spain)

4 October 2022 3	Marseille (France)	4–1	(Portugal) Sporting CP	Marseille, France
19:05 CEST (UTC+2)	Sánchez 13'; Harit 16'; Balerdi 28'; Veretout (yellow card) 43'; Mbemba 84'	Report	Trincão 1'; Adán (red card) 23'; St. Juste (yellow card) 34'; Santos (yellow card) 40'; Esgaio (yellow card) 43'	Stadium: Stade Vélodrome; Attendance: 618; Referee: Davide Massa (Italy)
Note: The match was originally scheduled to be played at 18:45, but was delayed to 19:05 after the bus carrying Sporting CP's players was caught in traffic and arrived late at the stadium.

12 October 2022 4	Sporting CP (Portugal)	0–2	(France) Marseille	Lisbon, Portugal
20:00 WEST (UTC+1)	Esgaio (yellow card) 16' (yellow-red card) 19'; Ugarte (yellow card) 54'; Gonçalves (yellow card) 60' (yellow-red card) 60'; Porro (yellow card) 74'	Report	Guendouzi 20' (pen.); Sánchez 30'; Bailly (yellow card) 43'	Stadium: Estádio José Alvalade; Attendance: 38,126; Referee: Alejandro Hernández Hernández (Spain)

26 October 2022 5	Eintracht Frankfurt (Germany)	2–1	(France) Marseille	Frankfurt, Germany
21:00 CEST (UTC+2)	Kamada 3'; Kolo Muani 27', (yellow card) 54'; Smolčić (yellow card) 57'; Dina Ebimbe (yellow card) 75'	Report	Guendouzi 22'; Tavares (yellow card) 25'; Veretout (yellow card) 40'; Suárez (yellow card) 86'	Stadium: Waldstadion; Attendance: 48,700; Referee: Jesús Gil Manzano (Spain)

1 November 2022 6	Marseille (France)	1–2	(England) Tottenham Hotspur	Marseille, France
21:00 CET (UTC+1)	Mbemba 45+2'; Balerdi (yellow card) 76'	Report	Lenglet 54', (yellow card) 57'; Højbjerg (yellow card) 90+1', (goal) 90+5'	Stadium: Stade Vélodrome; Attendance: 50,768; Referee: Szymon Marciniak (Poland)

== Statistics ==
=== Appearances and goals ===
No.	Pos	Nat	Player	Total		Ligue 1		Coupe de France		UEFA Champions League	
No.	Pos	Nat	Player	Apps	Goals	Apps	Goals	Apps	Goals	Apps	Goals
Goalkeepers
1	GK	(Cameroon) CMR	Simon Ngapandouetnbu	0	0	0	0	0	0	0	0
16	GK	(Spain) ESP	Pau López	42	0	32+1	0	3	0	6	0
36	GK	(Spain) ESP	Rubén Blanco	7	0	6	0	1	0	0	0
Defenders
3	DF	(Ivory Coast) CIV	Eric Bailly	23	0	5+12	0	1	0	5	0
4	DF	(France) FRA	Samuel Gigot	33	2	24+2	2	2	0	2+3	0
5	DF	(Argentina) ARG	Leonardo Balerdi	44	1	30+5	0	3	0	5+1	1
7	DF	(France) FRA	Jonathan Clauss	42	2	32+2	2	2	0	6	0
23	DF	(Bosnia and Herzegovina) BIH	Sead Kolašinac	41	4	26+7	4	4	0	1+3	0
29	DF	(Burkina Faso) BFA	Issa Kaboré	29	1	9+13	1	2+1	0	0+4	0
30	DF	(Portugal) POR	Nuno Tavares	39	6	23+8	6	1+1	0	6	0
42	DF	(Comoros) COM	Yakine Said M'Madi	0	0	0	0	0	0	0	0
99	DF	(Democratic Republic of the Congo) COD	Chancel Mbemba	45	7	32+4	5	2+2	0	5	2
Midfielders
6	MF	(France) FRA	Matteo Guendouzi	43	5	25+8	2	4	1	5+1	2
8	MF	(Morocco) MAR	Azzedine Ounahi	10	1	1+7	1	0+2	0	0	0
10	MF	(France) FRA	Dimitri Payet	27	4	9+15	4	1	0	1+1	0
18	MF	(Ukraine) UKR	Ruslan Malinovskyi	23	2	13+7	1	3	1	0	0
21	MF	(France) FRA	Valentin Rongier	46	1	34+2	1	2+2	0	5+1	0
27	MF	(France) FRA	Jordan Veretout	48	5	31+7	4	4	1	6	0
47	MF	(Turkey) TUR	Bartuğ Elmaz	1	0	0	0	0+1	0	0	0
77	MF	(Morocco) MAR	Amine Harit	16	1	6+4	0	0	0	4+2	1
Forwards
9	FW	(Portugal) POR	Vitinha	16	2	5+9	2	0+2	0	0	0
17	FW	(Turkey) TUR	Cengiz Ünder	46	5	28+9	5	3	0	1+5	0
33	FW	(Cameroon) CMR	François-Régis Mughe	2	1	0+1	0	0+1	1	0	0
70	FW	(Chile) CHI	Alexis Sánchez	44	18	32+3	14	4	2	5	2
Players transferred out during the season
8	MF	(Brazil) BRA	Gerson	13	2	6+4	2	0	0	2+1	0
9	FW	(Poland) POL	Arkadiusz Milik	2	0	2	0	0	0	0	0
11	FW	(Colombia) COL	Luis Suárez	11	3	2+5	3	0	0	1+3	0
12	FW	(Senegal) SEN	Bamba Dieng	12	2	1+9	1	1+1	1	0	0
13	FW	(Democratic Republic of the Congo) COD	Cédric Bakambu	3	0	0+3	0	0	0	0	0
15	DF	(Croatia) CRO	Duje Ćaleta-Car	1	0	0+1	0	0	0	0	0
18	DF	(France) FRA	Isaak Touré	5	0	0+5	0	0	0	0	0
22	MF	(Senegal) SEN	Pape Gueye	19	1	4+10	1	1+1	0	0+3	0
29	DF	(Spain) ESP	Pol Lirola	0	0	0	0	0	0	0	0
32	FW	(France) FRA	Salim Ben Seghir	2	0	0+1	0	0+1	0	0	0

Last updated: 3 June 2023
Source: Competitions
