= Mmadi =

Mmadi is a Comorian surname. Notable people with the surname include:

- Ali M'Madi (born 1990), French-Comorian footballer
- Tadjidine Mmadi (born 2007), French footballer
- Yakine Said M'Madi (born 2004), Comorian footballer
