= Testud =

Testud is a surname. Notable people with this surname include:

- Kévin Testud (born 1992), French footballer
- Sandrine Testud (born 1972), French tennis player
- Sylvie Testud (born 1971), French actress, writer, and film director
