= Junior Diaz =

Junior Diaz is a name. People with that name include

- Júnior Díaz (footballer, born 1983), Costa Rican footballer
- Junior Diaz (footballer, born 2003), Ivorian footballer
