= Hillary Diaz =

French footballer (born 2004)

Personal information
- Full name: Hillary Gnoko Diaz
- Date of birth: 24 July 2004 (age 22)
- Place of birth: Saint-Herblain, France
- Height: 1.74 m (5 ft 9 in)
- Position: Defender

Team information
- Current team: Paris FC
- Number: 5

Youth career
- –2022: Nantes

Senior career*
Years	Team	Apps	(Gls)
2019–2022	Nantes	11	(2)
2022–2024	Bordeaux	36	(1)
2024–2026	Inter Milan	1	(0)
2025–2026	→ Fleury (loan)	28	(1)
2026–	Paris FC	0	(0)

International career^{‡}
2020	France U16	3	(1)
2022–2023	France U19	7	(0)
2024	France U20	3	(1)
2023–	France U23	4	(0)
2023–	France	1	(0)
- * Club domestic league appearances and goals as of 18:40, 3 July 2026 (UTC) ‡ National team caps and goals as of 13 September 2024

Hillary Gnoko Diaz (born 24 July 2004) is a French professional footballer who plays as a midfielder for Première Ligue club Paris FC. She previously played for Nantes and Bordeaux.

== Personal life ==
Diaz is the sister of Michel Junior Diaz.
