= Jonathan Ruque =

French association footballer (born 2000)

Personal information
- Date of birth: 22 May 2000 (age 26)
- Place of birth: Annecy, France
- Height: 1.76 m (5 ft 9 in)
- Position: Right-back

Team information
- Current team: Rumilly-Vallières
- Number: 25

Youth career
- 2011–2020: Annecy

Senior career*
Years	Team	Apps	(Gls)
2019–2020	Annecy II	13	(2)
2020–2023	Annecy	57	(2)
2024–	Rumilly-Vallières	11	(1)
- * Club domestic league appearances and goals as of 30 November 2024

Jonathan Ruque (born 22 May 2000) is a French professional footballer who plays as a right-back for Championnat National 1 club Rumilly-Vallières.

== Career ==
A youth product of Annecy since 2011, Ruque was promoted to their senior team in 2020. He helped the team come second in the 2021–22 Championnat National season and earn promotion into the Ligue 2. He debuted with Annecy in a 2–1 loss in the Ligue 2 to Niort on 30 July 2022.
