= Maxime Bastian =

French footballer (born 2001)

Personal information
- Date of birth: 9 May 2001 (age 25)
- Place of birth: Saverne, France
- Height: 1.73 m (5 ft 8 in)
- Position: Left-back

Team information
- Current team: Francs Borains
- Number: 29

Youth career
- 2011–2018: Strasbourg

Senior career*
Years	Team	Apps	(Gls)
2018–2024	Strasbourg II	29	(0)
2021–2024	Strasbourg	0	(0)
2021–2023	→ Annecy (loan)	56	(0)
2024	Sochaux	7	(0)
2024	Sochaux II	2	(0)
2024–2025	Villefranche	28	(1)
2025–	Francs Borains	31	(2)
- * Club domestic league appearances and goals as of 20 April 2026

Maxime Bastian (born 9 May 2001) is a French professional footballer who plays as a left-back for Belgian Challenger Pro League club Francs Borains.

== Career ==
A youth product of Strasbourg since the U11s, he began his senior career with their reserves in 2018. He signed his first professional contract with the club in May 2021. On 24 June 2021, he joined Annecy on loan for the 2021–22 season in the Championnat National. He helped Annecy come in second in the league, earning promotion into the Ligue 2. His loan was extended with Annecy for the 2022–23 season, and he also extended his agreement with his parent club Strasbourg until 2025.

On 25 January 2024, Bastian signed with Sochaux. On 31 July 2024, he moved to Villefranche.

In the summer of 2025, Bastian moved to Francs Borains in Belgium on a two-year contract.

== Career statistics ==
As of match played 2 June 2023

Appearances and goals by club, season and competition
Club	Season	League			Cup		Europe		Other		Total	
Club	Season	Division	Apps	Goals	Apps	Goals	Apps	Goals	Apps	Goals	Apps	Goals
Strasbourg II	2018–19	CFA 2	4	0	—		—		—		4	0
Strasbourg II	2019–20	CFA 2	15	0	—		—		—		15	0
Strasbourg II	2020–21	CFA 2	6	0	—		—		—		6	0
Strasbourg II	Total		25	0	—		—		—		25	0
FC Annecy (loan)	2021–22	CFA	32	0	—		—		—		32	0
FC Annecy (loan)	2022–23	Ligue 2	24	0	5	0	—		—		29	0
FC Annecy (loan)	Total		56	0	5	0	—		—		61	0
Strasbourg	2023–24	Ligue 1	0	0	0	0	—		—		0	0
Career total			81	0	5	0	0	0	0	0	86	0
