= Junior Diaz (footballer, born 2003) =

Footballer (born 2003)

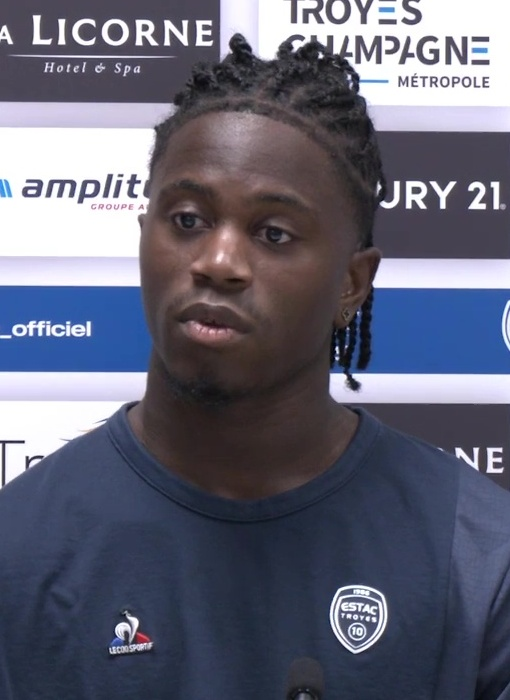
- Diaz in a press conference with Troyes in 2024

Personal information
- Full name: Michel Junior Diaz
- Date of birth: 23 July 2003 (age 23)
- Place of birth: Saint-Herblain, France
- Height: 1.93 m (6 ft 4 in)
- Position: Defender

Team information
- Current team: Troyes

Youth career
- 2012-2022: Nantes

Senior career*
Years	Team	Apps	(Gls)
2021–2024	Nantes B	29	(2)
2022–2024	Nantes	0	(0)
2023–2024	→ Annecy (loan)	20	(0)
2024–	Troyes	34	(0)
2025–2026	→ Brest (loan)	20	(0)

International career
2023-2023	Ivory Coast Olympic	5	(0)
2025–	Ivory Coast	1	(0)
- * Club domestic league appearances and goals as of 19 May 2026

Michel Junior Diaz (born 23 July 2003) is a professional footballer who plays as a defender for Ligue 1 club Troyes. Born in France, he plays for the Ivory Coast national team.

== Club career ==
Diaz was a youth player of Nantes. He joined Nantes' youth team in 2012, playing in the academy for ten years and winning the 2022 Under-19 league title under manager Pierre Aristouy.

During the 2022–23 season, Diaz started training with Nantes' first team and made his senior debut in a Coupe de France match against AF Virois, on 7 January 2023.

On 30 August 2023, Diaz joined Ligue 2 side Annecy on loan. Benched in the first matches of the season, on 26 September 2023, he made his Ligue 2 debut against Auxerre. Diaz immediately started get more space in the club's roster, becoming a starter. At the end of the season, he had a cumulative number of 22 appearances.

Back from the loan, on 8 August he joined Troyes on a permanent transfer. The transfer reportedly commanded a fee of almost €2.5 million. On 16 August, he made his club debut in a 4–0 loss against Guingamp.

On 13 July 2025, Diaz was loaned by Ligue 1 club Brest.

== International career ==
Junior Diaz has represented Ivory Coast at youth international level, having played for the Olympic team.

== Personal life ==
Diaz is the brother of Hillary Diaz.

== Career statistics ==
As of match played 20 December 2024

Appearances and goals by club, season, and competition
Club	Season	League			Cup (Note: Including appearances in Coupe de France.)		Europe		Other		Total	
Club	Season	Division	Apps	Goals	Apps	Goals	Apps	Goals	Apps	Goals	Apps	Goals
Nantes	2021–22	National 2	1	0	—		—		—		1	0
Nantes	2022–23	National 2	24	1	—		—		—		24	1
Nantes	2023–24	National 3	1	1	—		—		—		1	1
Nantes			26	2	—		—		—		26	2
Nantes	2022–23	Ligue 1	0	0	1	0	0	0	—		1	0
Annecy (loan)	2023–24	Ligue 2	20	0	2	0	—		—		22	0
Troyes	2024–25	Ligue 2	27	0	3	0	—		—		19	0
Career total			73	2	6	0	0	0	0	0	79	2

== Honours ==
Nantes U19

- Championnat National U19: 2021–22

Nantes

- Coupe de France runner-up: 2022–23
