= Kévin Farade =

French footballer (born 1995)

Personal information
- Date of birth: 1 September 1995 (age 31)
- Place of birth: Villiers-le-Bel, France
- Height: 1.88 m (6 ft 2 in)
- Position: Forward

Team information
- Current team: Fleury
- Number: 19

Youth career
- FC Villiers-le-Bel
- 2009–2012: Guingamp

Senior career*
Years	Team	Apps	(Gls)
2012–2013	Guingamp II	1	(0)
2013–2015	Paris Saint-Germain II	17	(1)
2015–2017	Lusitanos Saint-Maur	37	(7)
2017–2019	Entente SSG	28	(6)
2019–2020	Bobigny	20	(13)
2020–2022	Créteil	49	(17)
2022–2024	Annecy	10	(0)
2023–2024	→ Nancy (loan)	14	(2)
2024–	Fleury	58	(26)
- * Club domestic league appearances and goals as of 23 June 2026

Kévin Farade (born 1 September 1995) is a French professional footballer who plays as a forward for Ligue 3 club Fleury.

== Club career ==
Farade is a product of the youth academies of FC Villiers-le-Bel and Guingamp. He began his senior career with the reserves of Guingamp in 2012, before moving to Paris Saint-Germain II in 2013. He followed that up with stints at Lusitanos Saint-Maur, Entente SSG and AF Bobigny. After a breakout season with Bobigny scoring 13 goals in 20 games, he moved to Créteil on 13 June 2020. After another successful stint with Créteil, he transferred to Annecy on 5 June 2022, as they were newly promoted into the Ligue 2. He made his professional debut with Annecy in a 2–1 Ligue 2 loss to Niort on 30 July 2022.

== International career ==
Born in Metropolitan France, Farade is of Martiniquais descent. He was first called up to the Martinique national team in May 2022, but did not make an appearance due to administrative issues.
