= Moïse Sahi Dion =

Ivorian footballer (born 2001)

Personal information
- Full name: Moïse Orell Dion Sahi
- Date of birth: 20 December 2001 (age 24)
- Place of birth: Abidjan, Ivory Coast
- Height: 1.75 m (5 ft 9 in)
- Position: Forward

Team information
- Current team: Annecy
- Number: 80

Youth career
- Ivoire Académie
- Afrique Football Élite

Senior career*
Years	Team	Apps	(Gls)
2020–2021	Afrique Football Élite		
2021–2025	Strasbourg	32	(4)
2022–2025	Strasbourg B	2	(2)
2022–2023	→ Annecy (loan)	36	(15)
2025–2026	Dender	5	(0)
2026–	Annecy	12	(5)

International career
2023	Ivory Coast U23	1	(1)
- * Club domestic league appearances and goals as of 11 May 2026

Moïse Orell Dion Sahi (born 20 December 2001), known as Moïse Sahi Dion, is an Ivorian professional footballer who plays as a forward for French Ligue 2 club Annecy.

== Club career ==
A youth product of Afrique Football Élite, Sahi Dion signed for Strasbourg's reserve side in January 2021. However, he made his professional debut for the first team on 4 April 2021, coming on as a substitute in a 3–2 Ligue 1 win over Bordeaux. Six days later, he scored his first goal for the club in a 4–1 loss to Paris Saint-Germain.

On 3 August 2022, Sahi Dion joined Ligue 2 side Annecy on loan for the season. He made his club debut in a 1–0 loss to Amiens on 6 August, and scored his first two goals for the club in 2–2 draw against Rodez two weeks later. On 1 March 2023, Sahi Dion scored Annecy's first goal in a 2–2 draw against Marseille in the Coupe de France quarter-finals; Annecy would go on to win 6–5 on penalties, qualifying for the semi-finals for the first time ever. In the semi-finals against Toulouse, Sahi Dion scored a left-footed volley from outside the box to tie the match 2–2 in the 90th minute; however, it was ruled out for offside, and Annecy eventually lost 2–1.

On 29 July 2025, Sahi Dion signed for Belgian Pro League club Dender.

On 2 February 2026, he returned to Annecy with a three-and-a-half-year contract.

== International career ==
Sahi Dion was called up to the Ivory Coast U23s in March 2023.

== Personal life ==
Born in Ivory Coast, Sahi Dion is of Malian descent, and holds both Ivorian and Malian nationality.

== Career statistics ==
As of 1 July 2025

Appearances and goals by club, season and competition
Club	Season	League			Cup		Other		Total	
Club	Season	Division	Apps	Goals	Apps	Goals	Apps	Goals	Apps	Goals
Strasbourg	2020–21	Ligue 1	6	1	0	0	—		6	1
Strasbourg	2021–22	Ligue 1	8	0	1	0	—		9	0
Strasbourg	2023–24	Ligue 1	18	3	2	2	—		20	5
Strasbourg	2024–25	Ligue 1	0	0	0	0	—		0	0
Strasbourg	Total		32	4	3	2	—		35	6
Strasbourg B	2021–22	National 3	1	1	—		—		1	1
Strasbourg B	2023–24	National 3	1	1	—		—		1	1
Strasbourg B	Total		2	2	—		—		2	2
Annecy (loan)	2022–23	Ligue 2	36	15	6	5	—		42	20
Dender	2025–26	Belgian Pro League	0	0	0	0	—		0	0
Career total			70	21	9	7	0	0	79	28
