= Jean-Jacques Rocchi =

French footballer (born 1989)

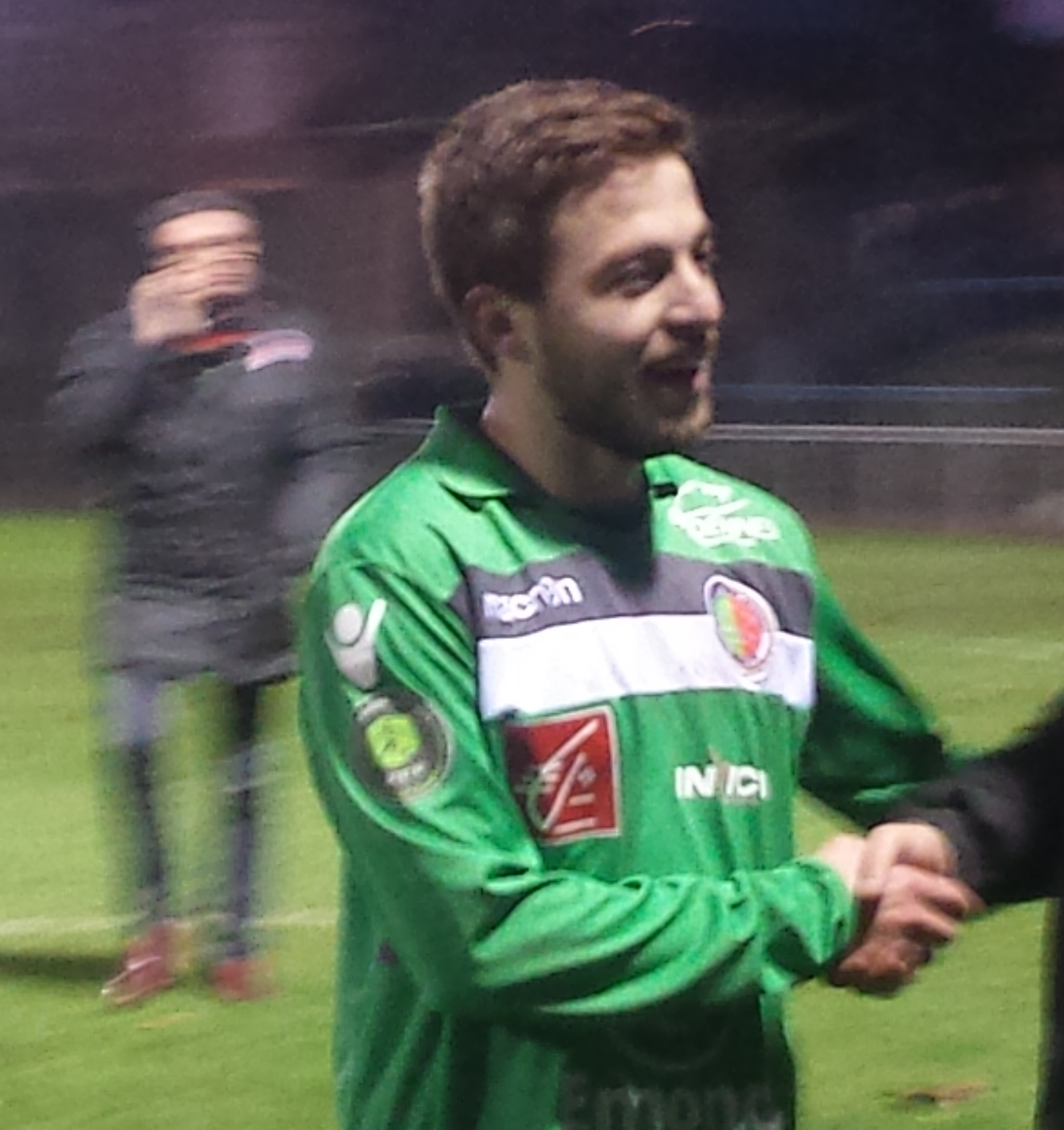
- Rocchi with Sedan in 2015

Personal information
- Date of birth: 1 June 1989 (age 37)
- Place of birth: Bastia, France
- Height: 1.70 m (5 ft 7 in)
- Position: Midfielder

Team information
- Current team: Borgo
- Number: 10

Youth career
- 2006–2008: Bastia

Senior career*
Years	Team	Apps	(Gls)
2008–2011	Bastia	23	(0)
2011	Compiègne	1	(0)
2011–2013	Calvi	59	(7)
2013–2016	Sedan	81	(11)
2016–2018	Dunkerque	57	(3)
2018–2023	Annecy	125	(10)
2023–	Borgo	50	(6)

International career
2009–	Corsica	4	(0)
- * Club domestic league appearances and goals as of 4 December 2025

Jean-Jacques Rocchi (born 1 June 1989) is a French professional footballer who plays as a midfielder for Championnat National 1 club Borgo.

== Club career ==
Born in the town, Rocchi spent his youth career with Bastia. In June 2011 he left to sign for Compiègne. After a four months he returned to Corsica and joined in September 2009 to Calvi.

Following Calvi's decision to withdraw from the CFA, Rocchi signed with Sedan.

In June 2016, after three seasons and back-to-back promotions with Sedan, Rocchi signed a two-year deal with Championnat National side USL Dunkerque.

Rocchi signed for Annecy in the Championnat National 2 in June 2018, agreeing a three-year contract.

== International career ==
Rocchi is a member of the unofficial Corsica national team.
