= Alexy Bosetti =

French footballer (born 1993)

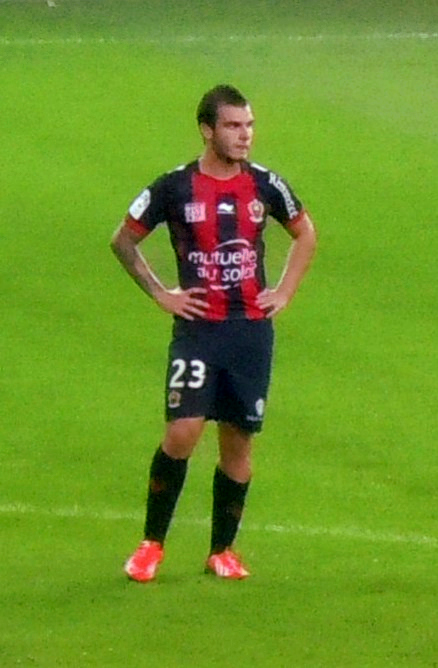
- Bosetti with Nice in 2013

Personal information
- Full name: Alexy Bosetti
- Date of birth: 23 April 1993 (age 33)
- Place of birth: Nice, France
- Height: 1.72 m (5 ft 8 in)
- Position: Striker

Team information
- Current team: Milazzo
- Number: 25

Youth career
- 1999–2009: Cavigal Nice Sports
- 2009–2012: Nice

Senior career*
Years	Team	Apps	(Gls)
2012–2017	Nice II	27	(13)
2012–2017	Nice	75	(10)
2015	→ Tours (loan)	9	(1)
2016	→ Sarpsborg 08 (loan)	2	(0)
2017–2019	Laval	34	(13)
2018–2019	Laval II	2	(2)
2019	OKC Energy FC	19	(1)
2019–2020	El Paso Locomotive	10	(1)
2020–2021	Le Puy	6	(6)
2021–2024	Annecy	71	(17)
2024	Imperia	7	(2)
2024–2025	Pays de Grasse	17	(6)
2025–	Milazzo	19	(1)

International career
2012	France U19	6	(3)
2012–2013	France U20	14	(1)
Medal record
Representing France
Men's football
FIFA U-20 World Cup
Winner	2013 Turkey
- * Club domestic league appearances and goals as of 25 January 2026

Alexy Bosetti (born 23 April 1993) is a French professional footballer who plays as a striker for Italian Serie D club Milazzo.

== Early life ==
Alexy Bosetti was born in 1993 to a Niçois family of Italian origins. He is the great grandnephew of the composer and pianist Henri Betti and of the opera singer Freda Betti.

== Club career ==
=== Early career ===
A member of the Populaire Sud since his early years as a native of Vieux-Nice, the young striker was a part of the Cavigal Nice Sports and J.S.O. Villefranche-sur-Mer youth academies before committing to Nice. An excellent dribbler, Bosetti has since played as either an attacking midfielder or a striker. He won the 2011–2012 edition of the Coupe Gambardella with Nice's U19 team on 28 April 2012.

=== Nice ===
Bosetti made his professional debut with Nice on 20 May 2012 in a league match against Lyon making a substitute appearance in the 86th minute of play. He scored his first professional goal against Montpellier in the quarter-finals of the 19th edition of the Coupe de la Ligue on 28 November 2012. On 6 April 2013, at Stadium Municipal, he collected the first red card of his career after a tackle on Cheikh M'Bengue of Toulouse.

On 22 September 2013, Bosetti became the first native of Nice to score a goal at the Allianz Riviera during the inaugural match against Valenciennes. On 13 September 2014, he scored a stoppage-time winner in a 1–0 home victory over Metz.

==== Loan to Tours ====
On 15 July 2015, Bosetti joined Tours on loan, without an option to buy. He scored a goal in his first friendly, securing a 1–1 draw against Niort on 24 July 2015. On 21 August 2015, Bosetti scored his first official goal for Tours, helping his side to a 3–1 victory over Auxerre.

==== Loan to Sarpsborg 08 ====
In January 2016, Bosetti joined Norwegian side Sarpsborg 08 on loan until the end of season. He scored for Sarpsborg 08 on 13 April 2016 in a 5–0 victory over Ås in a Norwegian Cup match. His loan was cut short early in April after playing in just two league matches in three months with the club. Having been loaned out to Tours in the first half the season, he was not eligible to play for Nice during the rest of the season.

==== Return to Nice ====
After a short loan spell he returned to Nice, but did not feature regularly for the first team. On 8 December 2016, he scored his first goal in Europe for Nice, helping the club to a 2–1 win over Krasnodar in a Europa League match. During the 2016–17 season he played primarily for Nice II, scoring 10 goals in 21 appearances in the Championnat de France Amateur.

He left the club at the end of his contract in summer 2017.

=== Laval ===
In August 2017, free agent Bosetti joined third-tier side Laval on a one-year contract with the option of another year in case of promotion to Ligue 2.

=== OKC Energy FC ===
On 24 January 2019, Bosetti moved to the United States when he joined second-tier USL Championship side OKC Energy FC.

=== El Paso Locomotive ===
On 15 August 2019, Bosetti was traded to El Paso Locomotive in exchange for Derek Gebhard. On 28 June 2020, it was announced that Bosetti and El Paso had mutually agreed to part ways.

=== Return to France ===
On 3 August 2020, Bosetti joined French club Le Puy.

On 28 June 2021, Bosetti signed with Annecy. On 6 April 2023, he scored a penalty in Annecy's 2–1 defeat to Toulouse in the semi-finals of the Coupe de France.

== International career ==
On 13 July 2013, 15 years and one day after the victory of France at the 1998 FIFA World Cup, Bosetti won the 2013 FIFA U-20 World Cup with the France U-20 team. The final in Istanbul against Uruguay was decided in a penally shootout with France winning 4–1.

== Career statistics ==
As of match played 6 April 2023

Appearances and goals by club, season and competition
Club	Season	League			Cup (Note: Includes Coupe de France and Coupe de la Ligue)		Continental		Total	
Club	Season	Division	Apps	Goals	Apps	Goals	Apps	Goals	Apps	Goals
Nice	2011–12	Ligue 1	1	0	0	0	—		1	0
Nice	2012–13	Ligue 1	27	0	3	2	—		30	2
Nice	2013–14	Ligue 1	20	5	5	1	2 (Note: Appearance(s) in UEFA Europa League)	0	27	6
Nice	2014–15	Ligue 1	27	5	2	1	—		29	6
Nice	2016–17	Ligue 1	0	0	1	0	1	1	2	1
Nice	Total		75	10	11	4	3	1	89	15
Nice II	2012–13	National 3	3	1	—		—		3	1
Nice II	2013–14	National 2	2	1	—		—		2	1
Nice II	2014–15	National 2	1	1	—		—		1	1
Nice II	2016–17	National 2	21	10	—		—		21	10
Nice II	Total		27	13	—		—		27	13
Tours (loan)	2015–16	Ligue 2	9	1	5	1	—		14	2
Sarpsborg 08 (loan)	2016	Tippeligaen	2	0	1	1	—		3	1
Laval	2017–18	National	26	9	0	0	—		26	9
Laval	2018–19	National	8	4	1	0	—		9	4
Laval	Total		34	13	1	0	—		35	13
Laval II	2018–19	National 3	2	2	—		—		2	2
OKC Energy FC	2019	USL Championship	19	1	2	1	—		21	2
El Paso Locomotive	2019	USL Championship	9	1	0	0	—		9	1
El Paso Locomotive	2020	USL Championship	1	0	0	0	—		1	0
El Paso Locomotive	Total		10	1	0	0	—		10	1
Le Puy	2020–21	National 2	6	6	4	2	—		10	8
Annecy	2021–22	National	29	11	0	0	—		29	11
Annecy	2022–23	Ligue 2	28	4	5	1	—		33	5
Annecy	Total		57	16	5	1	—		62	16
Career total			241	62	29	10	3	1	273	73

== Honours ==
Nice U19

- Coupe Gambardella: 2011–12

France U20

- FIFA U-20 World Cup: 2013
