= Yohan Demoncy =

French professional footballer (born 1996)

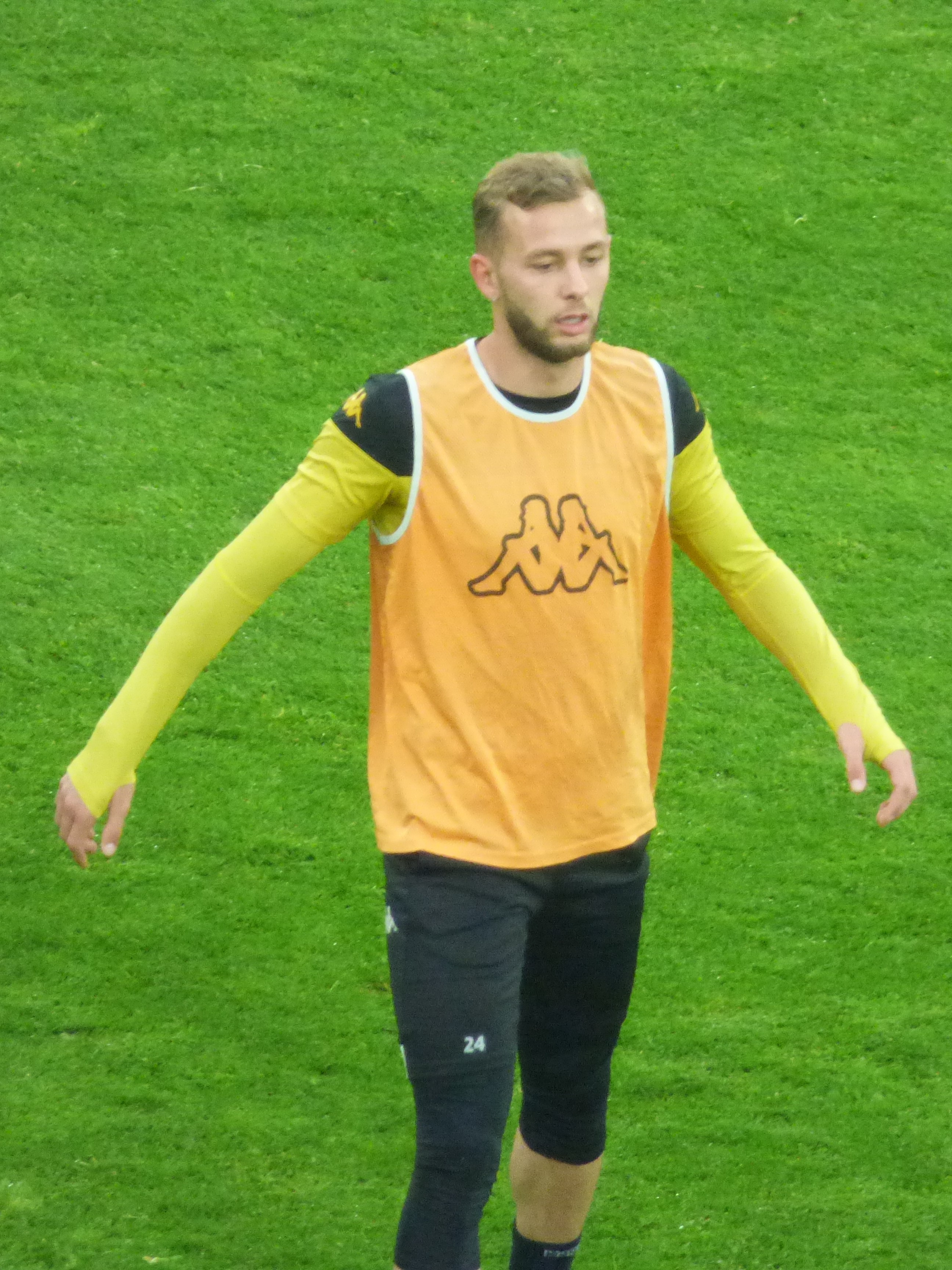
- Demoncy with Orléans in 2019

Personal information
- Date of birth: 7 April 1996 (age 30)
- Place of birth: Gonesse, France
- Height: 1.81 m (5 ft 11 in)
- Position: Defensive midfielder

Team information
- Current team: Sochaux
- Number: 24

Youth career
- 2009–2014: Paris Saint-Germain

Senior career*
Years	Team	Apps	(Gls)
2014–2018	Paris Saint-Germain B	64	(4)
2018	→ Orléans (loan)	13	(1)
2018–2021	Orléans	82	(1)
2021–2024	Paris FC	30	(0)
2022	Paris FC B	4	(1)
2022–2023	→ Annecy (loan)	27	(0)
2024–2025	Annecy	46	(8)
2025–2026	Reims	5	(0)
2026	→ Guingamp (loan)	16	(1)
2026–	Sochaux	0	(0)
- * Club domestic league appearances and goals as of 11 May 2026

Yohan Demoncy (born 7 April 1996) is a French professional footballer who plays as a defensive midfielder for Ligue 2 club Sochaux.

== Career ==
=== Paris Saint-Germain ===
Demoncy joined the youth academy of Paris Saint-Germain, and since 2014 played for their reserve side - eventually becoming captain of the reserves. On 25 June 2016, he signed his first professional contract with PSG for three years.

=== Orléans ===
On 30 January 2018, Demoncy joined US Orléans on loan from Paris Saint-Germain for the second half of the 2017–18 season. He made his professional debut with Orléans on 9 February 2018, scoring the late winner in extra time in a 3–2 Ligue 2 win over Chamois Niortais On 22 June 2018, he joined Orléans permanently on a three-year deal.

=== Paris FC ===
In July 2021, Demoncy joined Paris FC on a three-year deal.

=== Annecy ===
On 27 September 2022, Demoncy joined Annecy on loan for the 2022–23 season.

On 31 January 2024, Demoncy returned to Annecy.

=== Reims ===
On 24 June 2025, Demoncy signed a two-season contract with Reims. On 31 December 2025, he was loaned to Guingamp.

=== Sochaux ===
On 7 September 2026, Demoncy joined Sochaux on a one-year contract.

== Career statistics ==
As of match played on 8 January 2021

Appearances and goals by club, season and competition
Club	Season	League			Cup		League Cup		Other		Total	
Club	Season	Division	Apps	Goals	Apps	Goals	Apps	Goals	Apps	Goals	Apps	Goals
Paris Saint-Germain B	2013–14	CFA	1	0	–		–		–		1	0
Paris Saint-Germain B	2014–15	CFA	7	0	–		–		–		7	0
Paris Saint-Germain B	2015–16	CFA	19	1	–		–		–		19	1
Paris Saint-Germain B	2016–17	CFA	24	3	–		–		–		24	3
Paris Saint-Germain B	2017–18	National 2	13	0	–		–		–		13	0
Paris Saint-Germain B	Total		64	4	0	0	0	0	0	0	64	4
Orléans (loan)	2017–18	Ligue 2	13	1	0	0	—				13	1
Orléans	2018–19	Ligue 2	32	0	5	0	3	1	—		40	1
Orléans	2019–20	Ligue 2	20	0	2	0	2	0	—		24	0
Orléans	2020–21	National	14	1	0	0	—		—		14	1
Orléans	Total		66	1	7	0	5	1	0	0	78	2
Orléans B	2019–20	National 3	1	0	–		–		–		1	0
Career total			144	6	7	0	5	1	0	0	156	7
