= Bissenty Mendy =

Senegalese footballer (born 1993)

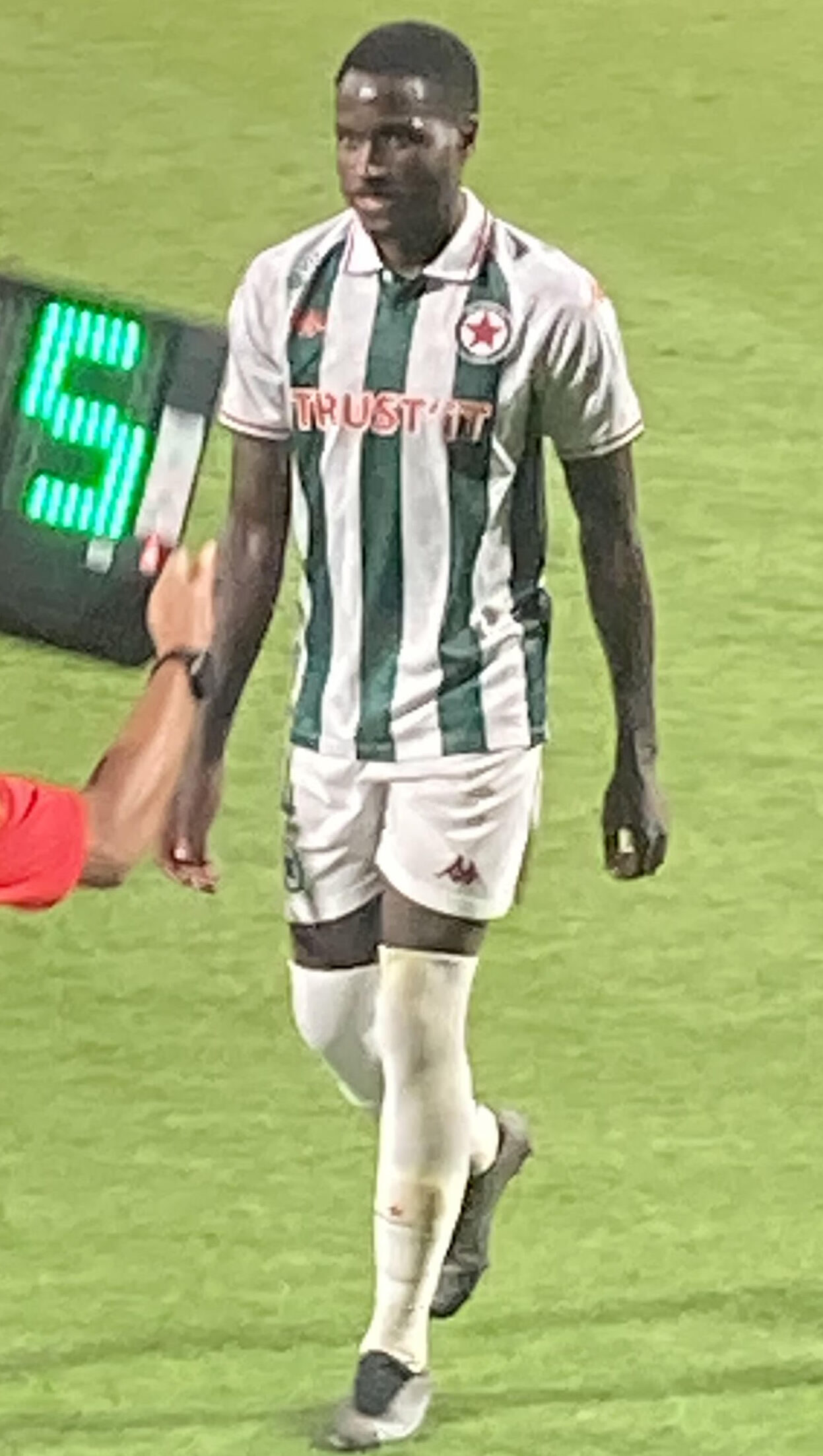
- Mendy with Red Star in 2024

Personal information
- Date of birth: 3 June 1993 (age 33)
- Place of birth: Guédiawaye, Senegal
- Height: 1.80 m (5 ft 11 in)
- Position: Centre-back

Youth career
- 2008–2012: Boulogne-Billancourt

Senior career*
Years	Team	Apps	(Gls)
2012–2015	Viry-Châtillon	47	(1)
2015–2018	Boulogne-Billancourt	74	(3)
2018–2019	Versailles	11	(0)
2019–2020	Sedan	31	(0)
2020–2023	Annecy	67	(2)
2023–2025	Red Star	24	(0)
- * Club domestic league appearances and goals as of 13 May 2025

Bissenty Mendy (born 3 June 1993) is a Senegalese professional footballer who plays as a centre-back.

== Career ==
Having moved to France from Senegal at the age of 10, Mendy is a youth product of Boulogne-Billancourt since the age of 15. He began his senior career with Viry-Châtillon in 2012. He returned to Boulogne-Billancourt in 2015, and after three seasons there had stints with Versailles and Sedan. He transferred to Annecy on 30 May 2020. He helped them come in second place for the 2021–22 Championnat National and earned promotion into the Ligue 2. He made his professional debut with Annecy in a 2–1 Ligue 2 loss to Niort on 30 July 2022.

== Honours ==
Red Star

- Championnat National: 2023–24
