= Arnold Temanfo =

Cameroonian footballer (born 1993)

Personal information
- Date of birth: 8 June 1993 (age 33)
- Place of birth: Edéa, Cameroon
- Height: 1.83 m (6 ft 0 in)
- Position: Right-back

Youth career
- 1999–2006: Red Star
- 2006–2007: Antony Sport
- 2007–2009: Entente SSG
- 2009–2010: Châteauroux
- 2010–2011: Real Zaragoza
- 2011–2012: Paris FC

Senior career*
Years	Team	Apps	(Gls)
2012–2015	La Rochelle	2	(0)
2015–2017	AS Cozes	11	(1)
2017–2018	FC Chauray	25	(1)
2018–2020	Lusitanos Saint-Maur	30	(3)
2020	Liège	4	(0)
2020–2021	Sète	18	(0)
2021–2023	Annecy	64	(2)
2023–2024	Dijon	30	(0)
2024	Al-Quwa Al-Jawiya	5	(1)
2025	Al-Hudood	4	(0)
2025–2026	Paris 13 Atletico	21	(1)
- * Club domestic league appearances and goals as of 23 June 2026

Arnold Temanfo (born 8 June 1993) is a Cameroonian professional footballer who plays as a right-back.

== Career ==
Temanfo is a youth product of the academies of Red Star F.C., Antony Sport, Entente SSG, Châteauroux, Real Zaragoza and Paris FC. He began his senior career in amateur clubs in France with La Rochelle in 2012. He moved to Cozes in 2015, and followed that up with stints with Chauray and Lusitanos Saint-Maur, before moving to Belgium with Liège in 2020. In the summer of 2020, he moved to Sète. On 27 June 2021, he transferred to the Championnat National side Annecy. He helped Annecy come in second place in the 2021–22 Championnat National season and earned promotion into the Ligue 2. He made his professional debut with Annecy in a 2–1 Ligue 2 loss to Niort on 30 July 2022, scoring his sides only goal in the 63rd minute.

== Personal life ==
Arnold Temanfo was born in Edéa in the Littoral region of Cameroon. He holds Cameroonian and French nationalities.
