= Jonathan Gonçalves =

French footballer (born 1989)

Personal information
- Date of birth: 25 January 1989 (age 37)
- Place of birth: Annecy, France
- Height: 1.82 m (6 ft 0 in)
- Positions: Centre-back; midfielder

Team information
- Current team: Annecy
- Number: 8

Youth career
- 1998–2008: Annecy

Senior career*
Years	Team	Apps	(Gls)
2008–2011	Annecy B		
2011–	Annecy	158+ (Note: Statistics only start from the 2015–16 season.)	(8+)
- * Club domestic league appearances and goals as of 11 June 2024

Jonathan Gonçalves (born 25 January 1989) is a French professional footballer who plays as a centre-back or midfielder for Ligue 2 club Annecy.

== Career ==
Gonçalves joined Annecy in 1998, and began his senior career playing with their reserves in the Départemental 1, the 9th division of France. Promoted to their first team in 2011, he saw the club rise 5 divisions in his tenure with them. His most recent promotion was to the Ligue 2 for the first time in the club's history after coming in second in the 2021–22 Championnat National, and where he acted as captain for 10 games. On 22 July 2022 at the age of 33, he signed his first professional contract with the club in their first ever season in the Ligue 2. He made his professional debut in a 0–0 Ligue 2 tie with FC Metz on 2 September 2022.

== Playing style ==
A versatile player, Gonçalves played as a forward as a youth, before moving back to midfielder and eventually centre-back where played most of his career. At the age of 34 in the Ligue 2 he again switched back to playing in midfield.

== Personal life ==
Born in France, Gonçalves is of Portuguese descent.
