= Florian Escales =

French footballer (born 1996)

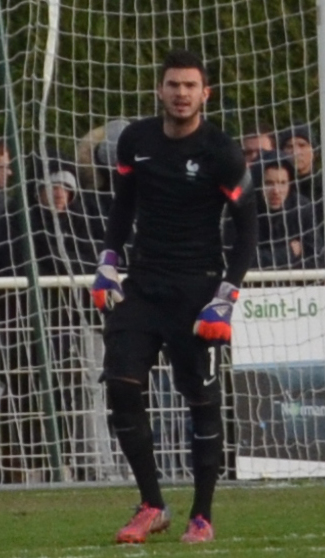
- Escales in 2015

Personal information
- Date of birth: 3 February 1996 (age 30)
- Place of birth: Aix-en-Provence, France
- Height: 1.84 m (6 ft 0 in)
- Position: Goalkeeper

Team information
- Current team: Annecy
- Number: 1

Youth career
- 2002–2004: Bassin Minier
- 2004–2018: Marseille

Senior career*
Years	Team	Apps	(Gls)
2013–2019	Marseille II	66	(0)
2018	Marseille	0	(0)
2019–2020	Laval	17	(0)
2019–2020	Laval B	2	(0)
2020–2021	Bastia-Borgo	33	(0)
2021–	Annecy	165	(0)

International career
2011–2012	France U16	13	(0)
2012–2013	France U17	7	(0)
2013–2014	France U18	3	(0)
2014–2015	France U19	11	(0)
2015–2016	France U20	6	(0)
2017	France U21	1	(0)
- * Club domestic league appearances and goals as of 11 May 2026

Florian Escales (born 3 February 1996) is a French professional footballer who plays as a goalkeeper for Ligue 2 club Annecy.

== Club career ==
Training with Marseille since the age of eight, Escales played with the reserve team from 2013. He signed his first professional contract with the club in July 2016. He made his professional debut on 13 December 2018 in the UEFA Europa League against Apollon Limassol. He played the full 90 minutes in a 3–1 away loss.

In June 2019 Escales left Marseille and signed for Laval. His senior league debut came in the Championnat National game against Le Puy on 2 August 2019.

In June 2020 Escales moved to Bastia-Borgo, also in the Championnat National. On 12 June 2021, he moved to Annecy in the same league.

== Career statistics ==
As of match played 10 May 2026

Appearances and goals by club, season and competition
Club	Season	League			National Cup		League cup		Europe		Total	
Club	Season	Division	Apps	Goals	Apps	Goals	Apps	Goals	Apps	Goals	Apps	Goals
Marseille II	2013–14	CFA 2	1	0	—		—		—		1	0
Marseille II	2014–15	CFA 2	2	0	—		—		—		2	9
Marseille II	2015–16	CFA	18	0	—		—		—		18	0
Marseille II	2016–17	CFA	24	0	—		—		—		24	0
Marseille II	2017–18	Championnat National 2	15	0	—		—		—		15	0
Marseille II	2018–19	Championnat National 2	6	0	—		—		—		6	0
Marseille II	Total		66	0	—		—		—		66	0
Marseille	2015–16	Ligue 1	0	0	0	0	—		0	0	0	0
Marseille	2016–17	Ligue 1	0	0	0	0	0	0	—		0	0
Marseille	2017–18	Ligue 1	0	0	0	0	0	0	0	0	0	0
Marseille	2018–19	Ligue 1	0	0	0	0	0	0	1	0	1	0
Marseille	Total		0	0	0	0	0	0	1	0	1	0
Laval	2019–20	Championnat National	17	0	1	0	—		—		18	0
Laval B	2019–20	Championnat National 3	2	0	—		—		—		2	0
Bastia-Borgo	2020–21	Championnat National	33	0	0	0	—		—		33	0
Annecy	2021–22	Championnat National	34	0	0	0	—		—		34	0
Annecy	2022–23	Ligue 2	34	0	0	0	—		—		34	0
Annecy	2023–24	Ligue 2	34	0	0	0	—		—		34	0
Annecy	2024–25	Ligue 2	34	0	0	0	—		—		34	0
Annecy	2025–26	Ligue 2	29	0	0	0	—		—		29	0
Annecy	Total		165	0	0	0	—		—		165	0
Career total			254	0	1	0	1	0	0	0	256	0
