= Yakine Said M'Madi =

Footballer (born 2004)

Personal information
- Date of birth: 11 March 2004 (age 22)
- Place of birth: Marseille, France
- Height: 1.83 m (6 ft 0 in)
- Position: Centre-back

Team information
- Current team: Olympique de Marseille
- Number: 5

Youth career
- 2009–2014: Burel FC
- 2014–2021: Marseille

Senior career*
Years	Team	Apps	(Gls)
2021–	Marseille B	19	(1)

International career^{‡}
2022–	Comoros	1	(0)
- * Club domestic league appearances and goals as of 18:56, 22 September 2022 (UTC) ‡ National team caps and goals as of 18:56, 22 September 2022 (UTC)

Yakine Said M'Madi (born 11 March 2004) is a professional footballer who plays as a centre-back for Olympique de Marseille. Born in France, he plays for the Comoros national team.

== Career ==
Said M'Madi is a youth product of the academies of Burel FC and Marseille. He was promoted to the Marseille reserves for the 2021–22 season in the Championnat National 2 season. On 7 April 2022, he made the bench for the senior side in a UEFA Europa Conference League match against the Greek club PAOK FC. He signed his first professional contract with the club on 13 July 2022, tying him until 2024.

== International career ==
Born in Marseille, M’Madi is Comorian descent. He was called up to the preliminary squad for Comoros U20 at the 2022 Maurice Revello Tournament. He was called up to the senior Comoros national team for a set of friendlies in September 2022. He made his debut with Comoros 1–0 friendly loss to Tunisia on 22 September 2022.
