= Clément Billemaz =

French association footballer (born 1998)

Personal information
- Date of birth: 22 September 1998 (age 28)
- Place of birth: Lyon, France
- Height: 1.75 m (5 ft 9 in)
- Position: Winger

Team information
- Current team: Annecy
- Number: 22

Youth career
- 2009–2015: Villefranche

Senior career*
Years	Team	Apps	(Gls)
2015–2016	Villefranche	7	(1)
2016–2019	Dijon II	59	(18)
2019–2022	Louhans-Cuiseaux	45	(14)
2022–	Annecy	109	(11)
- * Club domestic league appearances and goals as of 11 May 2026

Clément Billemaz (born 22 September 1998) is a French professional footballer who plays as a winger for Annecy.

== Career ==
Billemaz is a youth product of Villefranche, and began his senior career with them in 2015. He shortly after joined Dijon, where he played in the reserves for 3 years. In 2019, he moved to Louhans-Cuiseaux in the Championnat National 2. He transferred to the newly promoted side Annecy on 25 May 2022. He debuted with Annecy in a 2–1 loss in the Ligue 2 to Niort on 30 July 2022.
