= Parc des Sports (Annecy) =

Stadium in Annecy, France

- La Cuvette
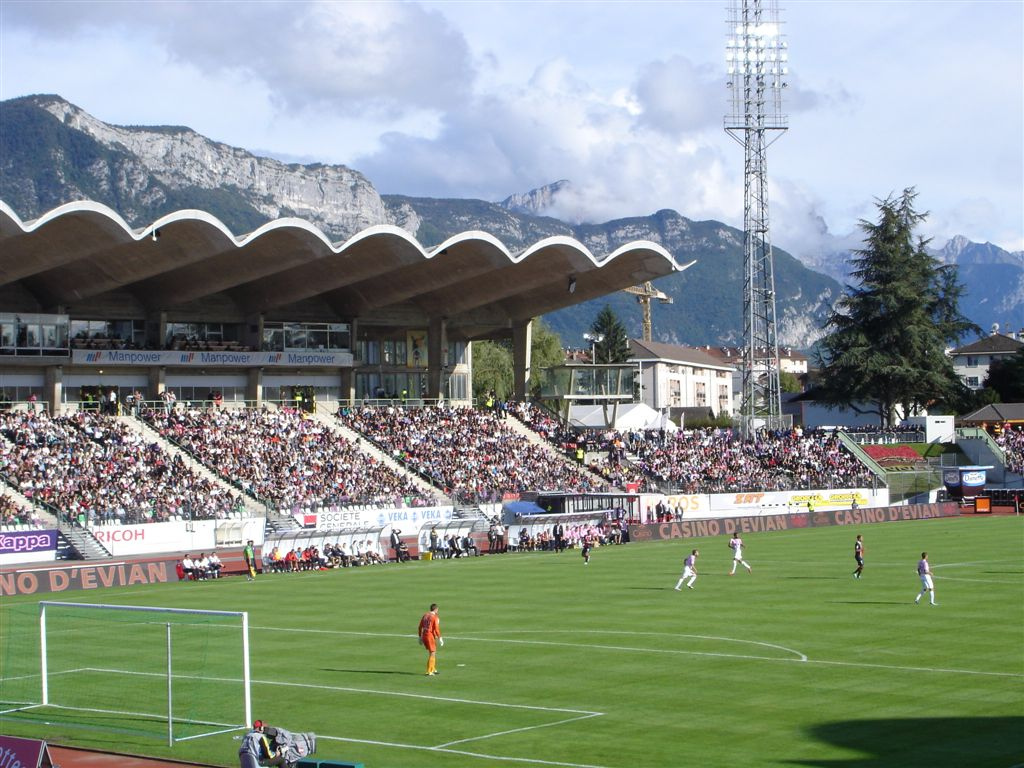
- Interactive map of Parc des Sports
- Full name: Parc des Sports
- Location: Annecy, France
- Coordinates: 45.916497°N 6.118054°E
- Operator: Annecy F.C.
- Capacity: 15,660

Construction
- Opened: 1964
- Renovated: 2010
- Expanded: 2011

Tenants
- FC Annecy (1964–present); Evian Thonon Gaillard FC (2010–2016)

Parc des Sports is a multi-purpose stadium in Annecy, France. It is used by FC Annecy as the club’s home ground. The capacity of the stadium is 15,660 spectators. It also hosted the 1998 World Junior Championships in Athletics.
