= Vincent Pajot =

French footballer (born 1990)

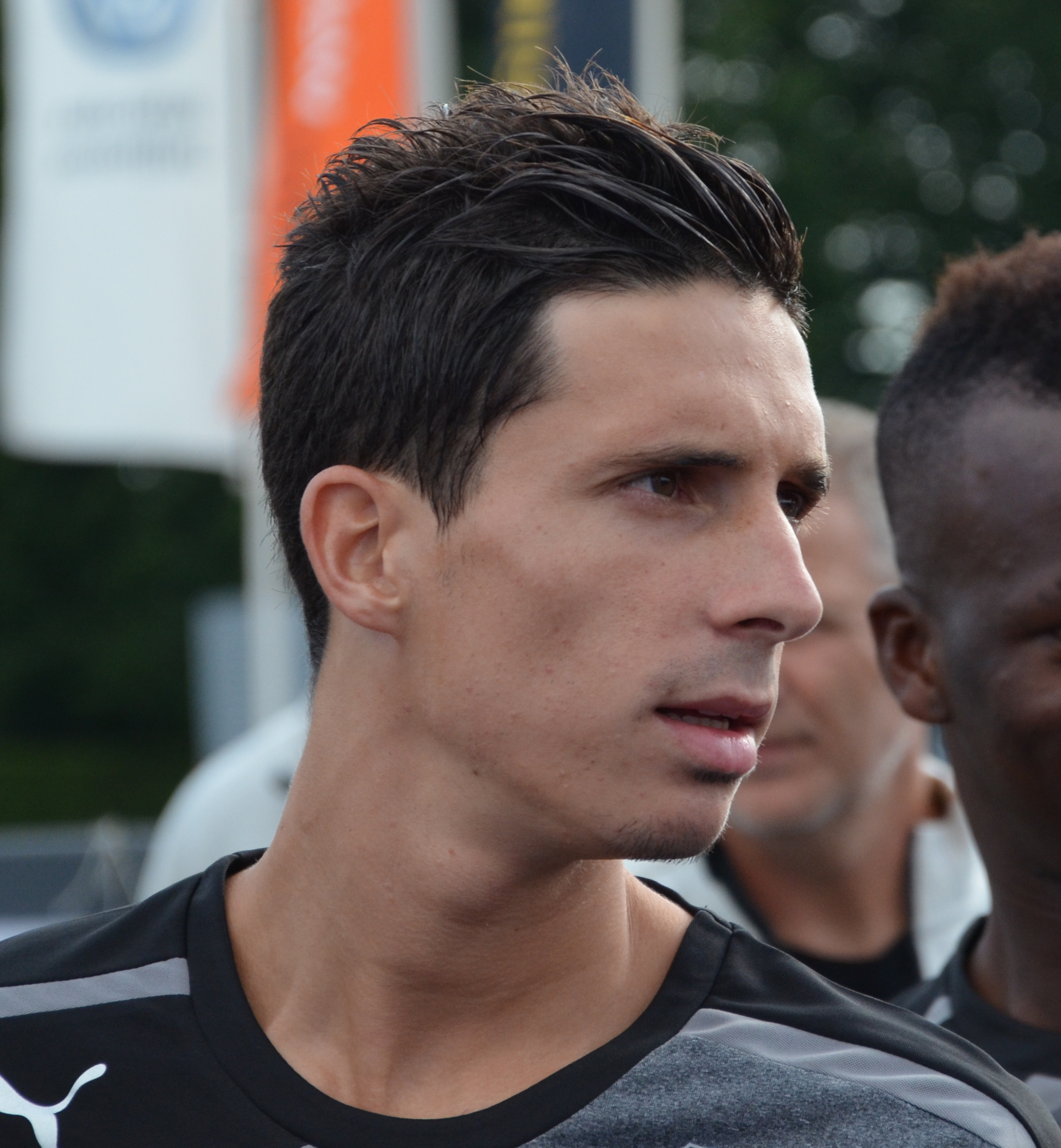
- Pajot with Rennes in 2014

Personal information
- Date of birth: 19 August 1990 (age 36)
- Place of birth: Domont, France
- Height: 1.80 m (5 ft 11 in)
- Position: Midfielder

Youth career
- 1996–1998: Bouffemont
- 1999–2001: Saint-Leu-la-Forêt
- 2001–2007: Saint-Leu PB 95
- 2007–2010: Rennes

Senior career*
Years	Team	Apps	(Gls)
2010–2015	Rennes	83	(1)
2010–2011	→ Boulogne (loan)	38	(6)
2015–2018	Saint-Étienne	69	(6)
2018–2020	Angers	19	(0)
2020	→ Metz (loan)	7	(0)
2020–2022	Metz	42	(1)
2022–2026	Annecy	98	(6)

International career
2009	France U20	2	(0)
2010–2013	France U21	15	(1)
- * Club domestic league appearances and goals

Vincent Pajot (born 19 August 1990) is a French former professional footballer who primarily played as a defensive midfielder. Pajot was a France youth international having earned caps at under-20 and under-21 level.

== Club career ==
Having come into the Rennes youth team, Pajot went on to make 83 league appearances for the club, scoring on one occasion. This followed having a loan spell at Boulogne, where he made his professional debut in a Coupe de la Ligue match against Nantes.

After struggling for a place in the Rennes B team for two years, on 2 June 2015, Pajot signed for Saint-Étienne for a free transfer on a four-year deal. He went on to make more than 50 appearances for them.

On 6 July 2022, Pajot moved to Annecy.
