= Madyen El Jaouhari =

French association footballer (born 1999)

Personal information
- Date of birth: 16 March 1999 (age 27)
- Place of birth: Ferney-Voltaire, France
- Height: 1.81 m (5 ft 11 in)
- Position: Attacking midfielder

Team information
- Current team: Étoile Carouge
- Number: 6

Youth career
- 2004–2013: AS Saint Genis
- 2013–2017: Thonon Evian

Senior career*
Years	Team	Apps	(Gls)
2017–2019	Nancy II	38	(1)
2019–2023	Annecy	45	(4)
2023–	Étoile Carouge	80	(3)
- * Club domestic league appearances and goals as of 28 September 2026

Madyen El Jaouhari (born 16 March 1999) is a French professional footballer who plays as an attacking midfielder for Étoile Carouge.

== Career ==
El Jaouhari is a youth product of the academies of AS Saint Genis and Thonon Evian. He moved to Nancy in 2017 and played for their reserves until 2019. He transferred to Annecy in the summer of 2019 originally playing with their reserves, before moving to their senior team in 2021. He helped them come in second at the 2021-22 Championnat National season and promote into the Ligue 2. He debuted with Annecy in a 2–1 loss in the Ligue 2 to Niort on 30 July 2022.

In summer 2023, El Jaouhari signed a contract with Étoile Carouge in Swiss Promotion League.

== Personal life ==
Born in France, El Jaouhari is of Moroccan descent.
