= Samuel Ntamack =

French footballer (born 2001)

Personal information
- Full name: Samuel Ntamack Ndimba
- Date of birth: 20 October 2001 (age 25)
- Place of birth: Montreuil, France
- Height: 1.78 m (5 ft 10 in)
- Position: Striker

Team information
- Current team: Piast Gliwice
- Number: 19

Youth career
- 2011–2018: AS Bondy
- 2011–2019: Drancy
- 2019–2020: Guingamp

Senior career*
Years	Team	Apps	(Gls)
2020–2022	Guingamp II	27	(4)
2022–2023	Romorantin	13	(13)
2023–2025	Annecy	43	(10)
2024–2025	→ Lokeren-Temse (loan)	24	(8)
2025–2026	Huesca	12	(2)
2026	→ Amiens (loan)	13	(2)
2026–	Piast Gliwice	9	(2)
- * Club domestic league appearances and goals as of 20 September 2026

Samuel Ntamack Ndimba (born 20 October 2001) is a French professional footballer who plays as a striker for Ekstraklasa club Piast Gliwice.

== Career ==
Ntamack is a youth product of AS Bondy, Drancy, and Guingamp. He began his senior career with the reserves of Guingamp in 2020, before moving to the Championnat National 2 side Romorantin in the summer of 2022. To start off the 2022–23 season with them he scored 13 goals in 13 games and was one of the top scorers in the division. This earned him a transfer to the Ligue 2 side FC Annecy on 13 January 2023 until 2025. He made his professional debut with Annecy in a 1–1 (4–3) penalty shootout win over ASM Belfort on 22 January 2023.

On 6 August 2025, Ntamack signed a three-year contract with SD Huesca of the Spanish Segunda División. On 2 February of the following year, he was loaned to Amiens in Ligue 2, for the second part of the season.

On 1 July 2026, Polish club Piast Gliwice announced the signing of Ntamack on a two-year deal with a one-year extension option.

== Personal life ==
Born in France, Ntamack is of Cameroonian descent.
