= Romain Spano =

French footballer (born 1994)

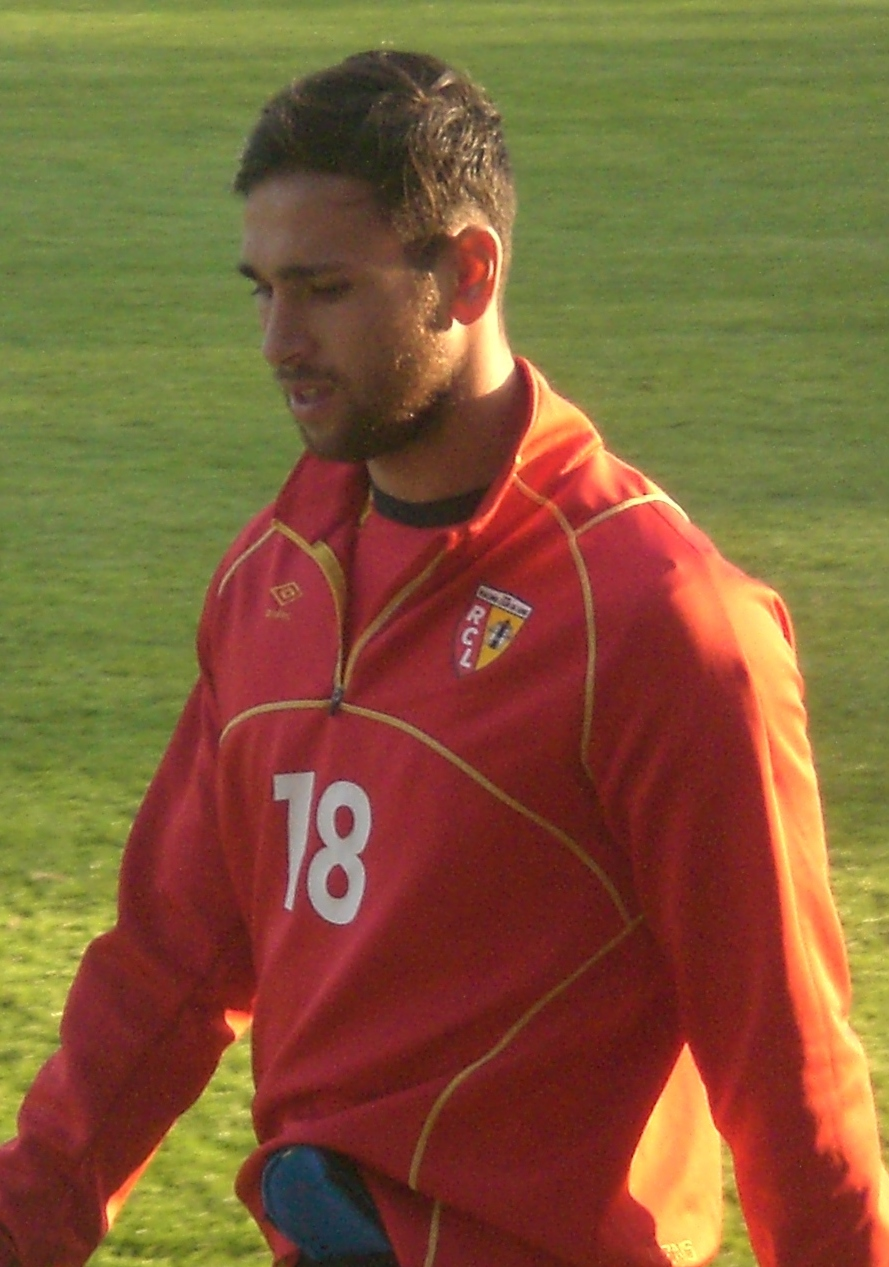
- Spano with Lens II in 2015

Personal information
- Full name: Romain Spano Rahou
- Date of birth: 31 October 1994 (age 32)
- Place of birth: Aubagne, France
- Height: 1.82 m (6 ft 0 in)
- Position: Forward

Youth career
- 2009–2011: Grenoble
- 2011–2014: Saint-Étienne

Senior career*
Years	Team	Apps	(Gls)
2012–2014	Saint-Étienne II	43	(16)
2014–2016	Lens II	28	(5)
2016–2017	Andrézieux	54	(19)
2017–2019	Clermont	4	(0)
2017–2019	Clermont II	3	(4)
2018–2019	→ Bourg-en-Bresse (loan)	20	(3)
2019–2024	Annecy	66	(28)
- * Club domestic league appearances and goals

Romain Spano Rahou (born 31 October 1994) is a French former professional footballer who played as a forward.

== Career ==
Spano trained as a youth player with Grenoble and Saint-Étienne before joining the Lens training centre. He joined Andrézieux in the winter of 2015–16.

After a successful start to the 2017–18 season with Andrézieux (scoring 10 goals in 13 league appearances), Spano signed his first professional contract with Clermont of the French Ligue 2 on 19 December 2017. He made his professional debut with Clermont in a 0–0 Ligue 2 tie with Tours on 12 January 2018. In June 2018 he joined Bourg-en-Bresse on loan for the 2018–19 season.

In July 2019, Spano terminated his contract with Clermont, signing for Annecy on a two-year deal.

== Personal life ==
Spano was born in France to an Italian father and an Algerian mother. Spano is the twin brother of Maxime Spano, who is also a professional footballer.
