= François Lajugie =

French footballer (born 1996)

Personal information
- Date of birth: 31 May 1996 (age 30)
- Place of birth: Bordeaux, France
- Height: 1.90 m (6 ft 3 in)
- Positions: Centre-back; midfielder

Team information
- Current team: Annecy
- Number: 6

Youth career
- ASV Malemort
- 2007–2011: Brive
- 2011–2013: Nantes
- 2013–2014: Brive
- 2014–2015: Orléans

Senior career*
Years	Team	Apps	(Gls)
2015–2016	Orléans	4	(0)
2016–2017	CA Bastia	11	(0)
2017–2018	Limoges	27	(5)
2018–2022	Bastia-Borgo	85	(5)
2022–	Annecy	109	(5)
- * Club domestic league appearances and goals as of 11 May 2026

François Lajugie (born 31 May 1996) is a French professional footballer who plays as a centre-back or midfielder for Annecy.

== Career ==
Lajugie is a youth product of Malermot, Brive, and Nantes, before returning to Brive. He made his senior and professional debut with Orléans as a half-time substitute in a 4–1 Ligue 2 loss to Arles-Avignon on 15 May 2015. He had a brief stint with CA Bastia in the 2016–17 season, before moving to Limoges in 2017. In 2018 he moved to Bastia-Borgo in the Championnat National where he spent 4 seasons. On 4 June 2022, he returned to Ligue 2 with a transfer to the newly promoted side Annecy.

== Personal life ==
Outside of football, Lajugie has also studied economics post-secondarily.
