= Kévin Testud =

French association footballer (born 1992)

Personal information
- Date of birth: 12 April 1992 (age 34)
- Place of birth: Montélimar, France
- Height: 1.80 m (5 ft 11 in)
- Position: Winger

Team information
- Current team: Angoulême
- Number: 12

Youth career
- Saint Marcel d'Ardèche
- 2005–2011: Bagnols Pont

Senior career*
Years	Team	Apps	(Gls)
2011–2014	Bagnols Pont	3	(0)
2014–2015	FC Sète	23	(3)
2015–2016	Béziers	24	(0)
2016–2019	FC Sète	83	(18)
2019–2020	Béziers	21	(10)
2020–2021	FBBP01	26	(1)
2021–2024	Annecy	94	(10)
2024–2025	Orléans	27	(4)
2025–2026	Villefranche	27	(0)
2026–	Angoulême	3	(0)
- * Club domestic league appearances and goals as of 4 September 2026

Kévin Testud (born 12 April 1992) is a French professional footballer who plays as a winger for Championnat National 1 club Angoulême.

== Career ==
Testud began playing football with his local side Saint Marcel, before moving to the youth academy of Bagnols Pont at the age of 13. He worked at the post office for 2–3 years, before becoming a semi-pro footballer with FC Sète. He had a short stint with Béziers, before returning to Sète, until returning again to Béziers in 2019. After a strong season there, he moved to FBBP01 in 2020. On 7 June 2021, he transferred to Annecy. He helped them come in 2nd in the 2021–22 Championnat National season and earned promotion into the Ligue 2. He made his professional debut with Annecy in a 2–1 Ligue 2 loss to Niort on 30 July 2022.

On 16 July 2024, Testud joined Orléans on a two-year contract.
