= Steve Shamal =

French footballer (born 1996)

Personal information
- Date of birth: 22 February 1996 (age 30)
- Place of birth: Ivry-sur-Seine, France
- Height: 1.81 m (5 ft 11 in)
- Position: Winger

Team information
- Current team: Bordeaux
- Number: 27

Youth career
- 2003–2004: CA Vitry
- 2004–2009: Bonneuil sur Marn
- 2009–2014: Bordeaux

Senior career*
Years	Team	Apps	(Gls)
2014–2016	Bordeaux II	47	(6)
2016–2017	Auxerre II	19	(2)
2017–2019	Reims II	22	(4)
2018–2019	Reims	1	(0)
2018–2019	→ Quevilly-Rouen (loan)	34	(6)
2019–2020	US Boulogne	17	(6)
2020–2022	Caen	27	(1)
2022–2024	Annecy	48	(4)
2024	Şanlıurfaspor	0	(0)
2024–2025	Martigues	10	(0)
2025–	Bordeaux	11	(1)

International career^{‡}
2011	France U16	3	(0)
- * Club domestic league appearances and goals as of 4 December 2025 ‡ National team caps and goals as of 23:30, 1 March 2023 (UTC)

Steve Shamal (born 22 February 1996) is a French professional footballer who plays as a winger for Championnat National 1 club Bordeaux.

== Club career ==
On 10 August 2017, Shamal joined Stade de Reims after a couple of years in the reserve sides of Bordeaux and Auxerre. Shamal made his first team debut for Reims in a 3–1 Ligue 2 win over RC Lens on 17 March 2018. He signed his first professional contract, of three-years duration, with the club in April 2018. He helped Reims win the 2017–18 Ligue 2 and gain promotion to Ligue 1 for the 2018-19 season.

In June 2018 Shamal joined Quevilly-Rouen on a season-long loan.

In August 2019 Shamal joined Boulogne on a two-year deal. Having been tracked by Caen throughout the 2019–20 season, he was signed by the club in October 2020, although due to a cruciate ligament injury he was not expected to play until 2021.

On 17 June 2022, Shamal agreed to move to Annecy. On 8 July 2025, he returned to his youth club Bordeaux.

== International career ==
Shamal was born in France to a Palestinian father and Algerian mother. He is a youth international for France, having played for the France U16s.

== Honours ==
Reims

- Ligue 2 (1): 2017-18
