= Kévin Mouanga =

French footballer (born 2000)

Personal information
- Date of birth: 24 July 2000 (age 26)
- Place of birth: Bondy, France
- Height: 1.91 m (6 ft 3 in)
- Position: Centre-back

Team information
- Current team: Kasımpaşa
- Number: 14

Youth career
- AS Bondy
- 2015–2016: FC Montfermeil
- 2016–2017: Angers

Senior career*
Years	Team	Apps	(Gls)
2017–2021	Angers II	48	(2)
2018–2019	Angers	0	(0)
2021–2024	Annecy	73	(5)
2024–2026	Lausanne-Sport	65	(2)
2026–	Kasımpaşa	2	(0)
- * Club domestic league appearances and goals as of 18 September 2026

Kévin Mouanga (born 24 July 2000) is a French professional footballer who plays as a centre-back for Süper Lig club Kasımpaşa in Turkey.

== Personal life ==
Mouanga was born in Bondy in the southeastern suburbs of Paris. He is of Congolese descent, and holds both French and Congolese nationalities.

== Career ==
Mouanga is a youth product of AS Bondy and FC Montfermeil, and moved to the youth academy of Angers at U16 level. He began his senior career with the reserves of Angers in 2017. He made his professional debut with the senior Angers squad in a 0–0 (3–2) penalty shootout loss to Guingamp on 31 October 2018, where he played the whole match. He signed a professional contract with Angers in the summer of 2020, and spent the year with the reserves. On 5 July 2021, he transferred to Annecy in the Championnat National. He helped Annecy achieve promotion to the Ligue 2 after coming 2nd in the 2021-22 Championnat National season. He debuted with Annecy in a 2–1 Ligue 2 loss to Niort on 30 July 2022.

On 25 August 2026, Mouanga moved to Turkish club Kasımpaşa.
