= Ahmed Kashi =

Association football player (born 1988)

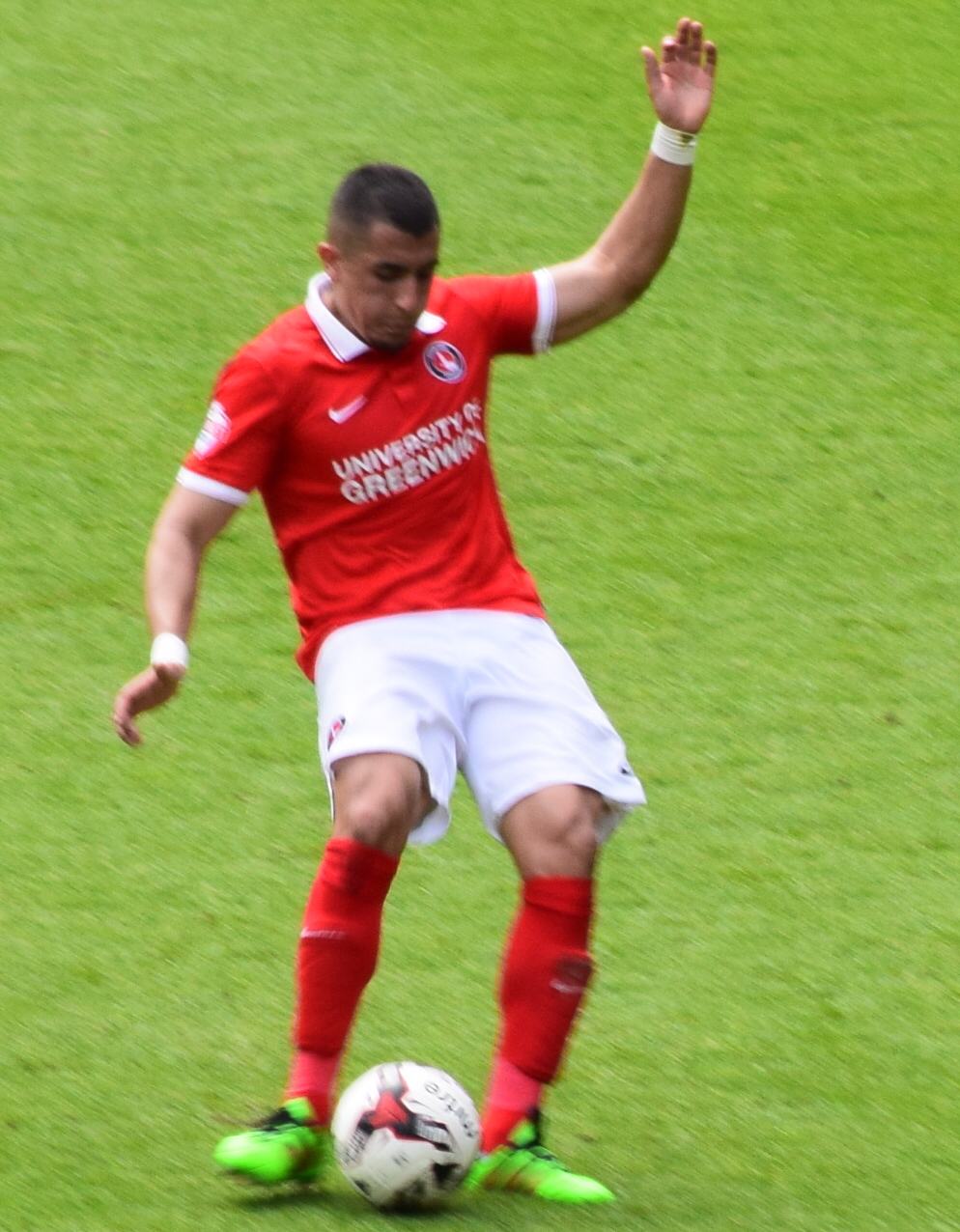
- Kashi with Charlton Athletic in 2016

Personal information
- Full name: Ahmed Kashi
- Date of birth: 18 November 1988 (age 37)
- Place of birth: Aubervilliers, France
- Height: 1.78 m (5 ft 10 in)
- Position: Midfielder

Team information
- Current team: Annecy
- Number: 5

Youth career
- 2007–2008: Châteauroux

Senior career*
Years	Team	Apps	(Gls)
2007–2012	Châteauroux	85	(4)
2012–2015	Metz	77	(1)
2014–2015	Metz B	5	(0)
2015–2018	Charlton Athletic	45	(2)
2018–2019	Troyes	11	(0)
2019	→ Oxford United (loan)	11	(0)
2020–	Annecy	174	(8)

International career
2015	Algeria	1	(0)
- * Club domestic league appearances and goals as of 11 May 2026

Ahmed Kashi (born 18 November 1988) is a professional footballer who plays as a midfielder forLigue 2 club Annecy.

Born in France, he is a former Algeria international, and was a member of the squad at the 2015 Africa Cup of Nations.

== Club career ==
Born in Aubervilliers, France, Kashi made his first team debut for Châteauroux on 15 April 2008, playing as a starter in the team's 2–0 league loss to Reims. In the summer of 2008, Kashi signed a one-year professional contract with Châteauroux.

On 18 July 2015, Kashi joined Charlton Athletic. He made his debut for Charlton against Queens Park Rangers on 8 August 2015, and scored his first goal for the club against Peterborough United in the League Cup on 25 August 2015. At the end of the 2017–18 season, Charlton entered into contract talks with Kashi. However, on 19 June 2018, caretaker manager for Charlton Athletic Lee Bowyer stated that Kashi would not be renewing his contract with the club.

On 16 July 2018, Kashi joined Troyes on a two-year deal. He was loaned out in January 2019 to Oxford United of EFL League One until the end of the season. He returned to his parent club at the end of the season, having made 12 appearances (11 of them in League One) without scoring. After his return, he was relegated to the Troyes' reserve team due to a conflict with the club.

On 3 February 2020, Kashi signed with Annecy.

== International career ==
Born in France, Kashi holds French and Algerian nationality and was therefore eligible to represent both nation. In an interview in 2009, he indicated that he would prefer to represent Algeria in international competition. In 2015, he was part of the Algeria national team at the 2015 Africa Cup of Nations, where he made his international debut in the final group stage match against Senegal.

== Career statistics ==
=== Club ===
As of match played 13 May 2022

Appearances and goals by club, season and competition
Club	Season	League			National Cup		League Cup		Other		Total	
Club	Season	Division	Apps	Goals	Apps	Goals	Apps	Goals	Apps	Goals	Apps	Goals
Châteauroux	2008–09	Ligue 2	21	2	0	0	0	0	0	0	21	2
Châteauroux	2009–10	Ligue 2	23	1	0	0	0	0	0	0	23	1
Châteauroux	2010–11	Ligue 2	17	1	0	0	0	0	0	0	17	1
Châteauroux	2011–12	Ligue 2	24	0	3	0	0	0	0	0	27	0
Châteauroux	Total		85	4	3	0	0	0	0	0	88	4
Metz	2012–13	National	25	0	2	0	2	0	0	0	29	0
Metz	2013–14	Ligue 2	33	0	0	0	2	0	0	0	35	0
Metz	2014–15	Ligue 1	19	1	1	0	2	0	0	0	22	1
Metz	Total		77	1	3	0	6	0	0	0	86	1
Metz B	2014–15	CFA	5	0	—		—		—		5	0
Charlton Athletic	2015–16	Championship	11	0	0	0	2	1	—		13	1
Charlton Athletic	2016–17	EFL League One	0	0	0	0	0	0	0	0	0	0
Charlton Athletic	2017–18	EFL League One	34	2	0	0	0	0	3 (Note: Two appearances in the EFL Trophy and one in the League One play-offs)	0	37	2
Charlton Athletic	Total		45	2	0	0	2	1	3	0	50	3
Troyes	2018–19	Ligue 2	11	0	2	0	1	0	0	0	14	0
Troyes	2019–20	Ligue 2	0	0	0	0	0	0	0	0	0	0
Troyes	Total		11	0	2	0	1	0	0	0	14	0
Oxford United (loan)	2018–19	EFL League One	11	0	0	0	0	0	1 (Note: One appearance in the EFL Trophy)	0	12	0
Annecy	2019–20	National 2	2	0	0	0	—		—		2	0
Annecy	2020–21	National	19	0	3	0	—		—		22	0
Annecy	2021–22	National	28	0	0	0	—		—		28	0
Annecy	Total		49	0	3	0	—		—		52	0
Career total			283	7	11	0	9	1	4	0	304	8

=== International ===
Appearances and goals by national team and year
National team	Year	Apps	Goals
Algeria	2015	1	0
Total		1	0
