= 2023–24 Stade Lavallois season =

Stade Lavallois
2023–24 season
- Manager: Olivier Frapolli
- Stadium: Stade Francis Le Basser
- Ligue 2: 7th
- Coupe de France: Round of 16
- Top goalscorer: League: Malik Tchokounté (8 goals); All: Malik Tchokounté (12 goals)
- Biggest win: US Provin 0–5 Laval (18 November 2023)
- Biggest defeat: Auxerre 4–0 Laval (23 April 2024)
Home colours	Away colours

The 2023–24 season was Stade Lavallois's 122nd season in existence and second consecutive in the Ligue 2. They also competed in the Coupe de France.

== Players ==
=== First-team squad ===
As of 8 January 2024

Note: Flags indicate national team as defined under FIFA eligibility rules; some limited exceptions apply. Players may hold more than one non-FIFA nationality.

No.	Pos.	Nation	Player
1	GK	FRA	Maxime Hautbois
2	DF	FRA	Kévin Perrot
3	DF	CGO	Marvin Baudry
4	MF	FRA	Jimmy Roye
6	MF	FRA	Sam Sanna
7	DF	FRA	Thibaut Vargas
9	FW	FRA	Junior Kadile
10	MF	FRA	Ryan Ferhaoui
11	FW	FRA	Rémy Labeau (on loan from Lens)
12	DF	GUI	Yasser Baldé
14	FW	GLP	Jordan Tell
15	DF	SEN	Elhadji Pape Diaw (on loan from Rukh Lviv)
17	FW	FRA	François-Xavier Tamuzo
18	FW	FRA	Malik Tchokounté

No.	Pos.	Nation	Player
19	FW	FRA	Noa Mupemba
21	DF	TUN	Amin Cherni
22	MF	FRA	Titouan Thomas
23	DF	POR	Yohan Tavares
25	DF	FRA	Edson Seidou
26	MF	FRA	William Benard
27	MF	BEN	Jordan Adéoti
28	MF	FRA	Antonin Bobichon
29	FW	FRA	Pablo Pagis (on loan from Lorient)
30	GK	MLI	Mamadou Samassa
31	DF	FRA	Irvyn Lomami (on loan from Lyon)
35	DF	COD	Peter Ouaneh
39	DF	FRA	Anthony Gonçalves
40	GK	FRA	Théo Chatelain

== Transfers ==
=== In ===
Pos.	Player	Transferred from	Fee	Date	Source
FW	(Guadeloupe) Rémy Labeau	(France) Lens	Loan	1 July 2023	
DF	(Tunisia) Amin Cherni	(France) Chambly	Free	1 July 2023	
FW	(Algeria) Zakaria Naidji	(Algeria) Paradou AC	Undisclosed	1 July 2023	
MF	(France) Sam Sanna	(France) Toulouse	Free	1 July 2023	
MF	(France) Junior Kadile	(France) Rennes	Free	18 July 2023	
FW	(France) Malik Tchokounté	(France) Nîmes	Free	4 July 2023	
DF	(France) Thibaut Vargas	(France) Nîmes	Free	18 July 2023	
MF	(France) Titouan Thomas	(Portugal) Estoril		16 August 2023	
FW	(Guadeloupe) Jordan Tell	Unattached	Free	1 September 2023	

=== Out ===
Pos.	Player	Transferred to	Fee	Date	Source
DF	(France) Dembo Sylla	(France) Lorient	€1,000,000	17 July 2023	
FW	(Guadeloupe) Geoffray Durbant	(France) Châteauroux	Free	21 July 2023	
DF	(France) Bryan Goncalves	(Belgium) Beveren	Free	31 July 2023	
FW	(Algeria) Zakaria Naidji	(Algeria) MC Alger	Undisclosed	29 August 2023	

== Pre-season and friendlies ==
Win Draw Loss Fixtures

== Competitions ==
=== Overall record ===
Competition	First match	Last match	Starting round	Final position	Record							
Competition	First match	Last match	Starting round	Final position	Pld	W	D	L	GF	GA	GD	Win %
Ligue 2	5 August 2023	17 May 2024	Matchday 1	7th	38	15	10	13	40	45	−5	39.47
Coupe de France	18 November 2023	7 February 2024	Seventh round	Round of 16	5	4	0	1	13	3	+10	80.00
Total					43	19	10	14	53	48	+5	44.19

Source: Soccerway

=== Ligue 2 ===
==== League table ====
Pos	Team	Pld	W	D	L	GF	GA	GD	Pts	Promotion or Relegation
5	Paris FC	38	16	11	11	49	42	+7	59	Qualification for promotion play-offs semi-final
6	Caen	38	17	7	14	51	45	+6	58	
7	Laval	38	15	10	13	40	45	−5	55	
8	Amiens	38	12	17	9	36	36	0	53	
9	Guingamp	38	13	12	13	44	40	+4	51	

Updated to match(es) played on 17 May 2024. Source: Ligue 2
Rules for classification: 1) Points; 2) Goal difference; 3) Number of goals scored; 4) Head-to-head goal difference; 5) Fair play points

==== Results summary ====
Overall								Home						Away					
Pld	W	D	L	GF	GA	GD	Pts	W	D	L	GF	GA	GD	W	D	L	GF	GA	GD
38	15	10	13	40	45	−5	55	6	5	8	19	27	−8	9	5	5	21	18	+3

Last updated: 17 May 2024.

==== Results by round ====
Round	1	2	3	4	5	6	7	8	9	10	11	12	13	14	15	16	17	18	19	20	21	22	23	24	25	26	27	28	29	30	31	32	33	34	35	36	37	38
Ground	H	A	H	A	H	A	H	A	H	A	H	A	A	H	A	H	A	H	H	A	H	A	H	A	H	A	H	A	H	H	A	H	A	A	H	A	H	A
Result	W	L	W	D	W	W	W	W	W	W	L	D	W	L	W	D	L	D	L	D	D	W	L	D	D	W	D	W	L	L	D	L	L	L	W	L	L	W
Position	7	12	5	6	3	1	1	1	1	1	1	1	1	1	1	1	2	3	4	4	4	3	4	4	3	3	3	3	4	4	4	7	7	7	7	7	7	7

Updated to match(es) played on 17 May 2024. Source:
A = Away; H = Home; W = Win; D = Draw; L = Loss

==== Matches ====
The league fixtures were unveiled on 29 June 2023.

5 August 2023 1	Laval	1–0	Angers	Laval
19:00	Tapoko (yellow card) 45+2'; Sanna 66'	Report	Lefort (yellow card) 36'; Abdelli (yellow card) 36'; Hountondji (yellow card) 62'	Stadium: Stade François Coty; Attendance: 8,912; Referee: Hakim Ben El Hadj

12 August 2023 2	Troyes	3–1	Laval	Troyes
19:00	Kouamé 15' (pen.); Ilić 20'; Boura (yellow card) 45'; Saïd 79'	Report	Gonçalves (yellow card) 40'; Yohan Tavares (yellow card) 85'; Tchokounté 90+5'	Stadium: Stade de l'Aube; Attendance: 4,697; Referee: (France) Abdelatif Kherradji

19 August 2023 3	Laval	1–0	Rodez	Laval
19:00 CET (UTC+1)	Roye (yellow card) 60'; Baldé 81' (yellow card) 84'	Report		Stadium: Stade Francis Le Basser; Attendance: 6,901; Referee: (France) Aurélien Petit

26 August 2023 4	Quevilly-Rouen	0–0	Laval	Le Petit-Quevilly
19:00	Camara (yellow card) 45'	Report	Sanna (yellow card) 11'	Stadium: Stade Robert Diochon; Attendance: 2,536; Referee: (France) Pierre Legat

2 September 2023 5	Laval	2–1	Caen	Laval
19:00 CET (UTC+1)	Kadile (yellow card) 56'; Vargas (yellow card) 78' (goal) 90+2'; Loïs Martins (yellow card) 88'; Tchokounté 90+5' (pen.)	Report	Daubin (yellow card) 44'; Mandrea (yellow card) 61'; Abdi 77'; Henry (yellow card) 90+4'	Stadium: Stade Francis Le Basser; Attendance: 8,889; Referee: (France) Rémi Landry

16 September 2023 6	Bastia	0–3	Laval	Furiani
19:00 CET (UTC+2)	Yapi (yellow card) 24'; Maggiotti (yellow card) 79'	Report	Roye 27'; Kadile (yellow card) 44'; Sanna (yellow card) 50'; Dramé 52' (o.g.); Baudry 55'	Stadium: Stade Armand-Cesari; Attendance: 12,363; Referee: (France) Olivier Thual

23 September 2023 7	Laval	2–1	Guingamp	Laval
19:00 CET (UTC+1)	Diaw 62'; Tchokounté (yellow card) 68' (goal) 89'	Report	Roux (yellow card) 44'; Guillaume 50' (yellow card) 52'	Stadium: Stade Francis Le Basser; Attendance: 8,800; Referee: (France) Thierry Bouille

26 September 2023 8	Paris FC	0–1	Laval	Troyes
20:45 CET (UTC+2)	Doucet (yellow card) 62'	Report	Diaw (yellow card) 45' (goal) 56'	Stadium: Stade de l'Aube; Attendance: 764; Referee: (France) Romain Delpech

30 September 2023 9	Laval	1–0	Valenciennes	Laval
19:00 CET (UTC+1)	Baudry (yellow card) 32'; Tchokounté 79'	Report	Knockaert (yellow card) 82'	Stadium: Stade Francis Le Basser; Attendance: 9,000; Referee: (France) Mickaël Leleu

7 October 2023 10	Bordeaux	0–1	Laval	Bordeaux
15:00 CET (UTC+2)	Ihnatenko (yellow card) 35'	Report	Tchokounté (yellow card) 13' (goal) 33'; Diaw (yellow card) 28'; William Benard (yellow card) 88'	Stadium: Matmut Atlantique; Attendance: 19,651; Referee: (France) Karim Abed

23 October 2023 11	Laval	0–1	Saint-Étienne	Laval
20:45 CET (UTC+1)	Baldé (yellow card) 45+3'	Report	Sissoko 13'; Larsonneur (yellow card) 86'	Stadium: Stade Francis Le Basser; Attendance: 9,394; Referee: (France) Mikael Lesage

28 October 2023 12	Amiens	0–0	Laval	Amiens
19:00 CET (UTC+2)	Fofana (yellow card) 12'; Kaïboué (yellow card) 34'	Report	Baldé (yellow card) 15'	Stadium: Stade de la Licorne; Attendance: 7,601; Referee: (France) Mickaël Leleu

4 November 2023 13	Annecy	1–3	Laval	Annecy
19:00 CET (UTC+1)	Ntamack 27' (pen.); Mouanga (red card) 84'	Report	Bobichon 8'; Roye (yellow card) 45+4' (goal) 56'; Mouanga 77' (o.g.); Tchokounté (yellow card) 83'; Thomas (red card) 84'	Stadium: Parc des Sports; Attendance: 5,353; Referee: (France) Nicolas Rainville

11 November 2023 14	Laval	0–3	Concarneau	Laval
19:00 CET (UTC+1)	Lebeau (red card) 42'; Roye (yellow card) 43'; Sanna (yellow card) 45+2'; Seidou (yellow card) 62'; Baudry (yellow card) 90+4'	Report	Mouazan 21'; Barès (yellow card) 48'; Ouaneh 53' (o.g.); Lebeau 90+3' (pen.)	Stadium: Stade Francis Le Basser; Attendance: 8,275; Referee: (France) Rémi Landry

25 November 2023 15	Dunkerque	0–2	Laval	Dunkirk
19:00 CET (UTC+1)	Opa Sanganté (yellow card) 78'	Report	Kadile 15' (yellow card) 41'; Cherni 33'; Bobichon (yellow card) 51'; Roye (yellow card) 68'; Tchokounté (yellow card) 82'	Stadium: Stade Marcel-Tribut; Attendance: 2,972; Referee: (France) Antoine Valnet

2 December 2023 16	Laval	1–1	Grenoble	Laval
19:00 CET (UTC+1)	Roye (yellow card) 39'; Baldé (yellow card) 58'; Baudry (yellow card) 61'; Gonçalves (yellow card) 68' (goal) 80'	Report	Maubleu (yellow card) 43'; Benet 59' (pen.)	Stadium: Stade Francis Le Basser; Attendance: 7,354; Referee: (France) Pierre Legat

5 December 2023 17	Ajaccio	2–0	Laval	Ajaccio
20:45 CET (UTC+1)	Sollacaro (yellow card) 33'; Touzghar 60'; Nouri 90+5' (pen.)	Report	Vargas (yellow card) 90+1'; Samassa (yellow card) 90+3'	Stadium: Stade François Coty; Attendance: 3,645; Referee: (France) Aurélien Petit

16 December 2023 18	Laval	1–1	Pau	Laval
19:00 CET (UTC+1)	Baldé (yellow card) 28'; Tchokounté (yellow card) 45'; Cherni 51'	Report	Obiang (yellow card) 42'; Sylla 64'	Stadium: Stade Francis Le Basser; Attendance: 6,550; Referee: (France) Benjamin Lepaysant

19 December 2023 19	Laval	1–3	Auxerre	Laval
20:45 CET (UTC+1)	Cherni 28'; Vargas (yellow card) 67'	Report	Sinayoko (yellow card) 17' (goal) 59'; Onaiwu 32'; Jubal (yellow card) 56'; Hein 69'	Stadium: Stade Francis Le Basser; Attendance: 9,793; Referee: (France) Rémi Landry

13 January 2024 20	Saint-Étienne	0–0	Laval	Saint-Étienne
15:00 CET (UTC+1)		Report		Stadium: Stade Geoffroy-Guichard; Attendance: 18,106; Referee: (France) Nicolas Rainville

23 January 2024 21	Laval	1–1	Paris FC	Laval
20:45 CET (UTC+1)	Pagis 6'; Roye (red card) 45+3'; Samassa (yellow card) 73'; Sanna (yellow card) 75'; Adéoti (yellow card) 90'	Report	Lukembila 46'; Camara (yellow card) 47'; Mbow (yellow card) 89'	Stadium: Stade Francis Le Basser; Attendance: 6,260; Referee: (France) Ahmed Taleb

27 January 2024 22	Rodez	1–2	Laval	Rodez
19:00 CET (UTC+1)	Hountondji 66'; Haag (yellow card) 90+4'; Buadés (yellow card) 90+4'	Report	Baudry (yellow card) 26'; Bobichon 59'; Thomas (yellow card) 86'; Adéoti (yellow card) 87'; Tell (yellow card) 90+1'; Diaw 90+6'	Stadium: Stade Paul-Lignon; Attendance: 2,677; Referee: (France) Rémi Landry

3 February 2024 23	Laval	2–4	Quevilly-Rouen	Laval
19:00 CET (UTC+1)	Sanna (yellow card) 40' (yellow-red card) 77'; Roye (yellow card) 57'; Tchokounté 59'; Bobichon 66'	Report	Cissokho 4'; Soumano 20'; Delaurier-Chaubet (yellow card) 36'; Yade 86'; Coulibaly (yellow card) 90+3' (goal) 90+5'	Stadium: Stade Francis Le Basser; Attendance: 6,794; Referee: (France) François Letexier

10 February 2024 24	Valenciennes	1–1	Laval	Valenciennes
19:00 CET (UTC+1)	Cuffaut 47'; Flamarion (yellow card) 87'; Bansé (yellow card) 90+1'	Report	Gonçalves (yellow card) 66'; Labeau 70' (yellow card) 79'; Baldé (yellow card) 72'	Stadium: Stade du Hainaut; Attendance: 5,946; Referee: (France) Pierre Legat

17 February 2024 25	Laval	1–1	Ajaccio	Laval
19:00 CET (UTC+1)	Tchokounté 32'; Labeau (yellow card) 42'; Thomas (yellow card) 90+2'	Report	Quemper (yellow card) 59'; Christopher Ibayi 61'	Stadium: Stade Francis Le Basser; Attendance: 6,783; Referee: (France) Thierry Bouille

24 February 2024 26	Concarneau	1–3	Laval	Brest
19:00 CET (UTC+1)	Célestine (yellow card) 80'; Ba 85'	Report	Tchokounté 2'; Baudry (yellow card) 26'; Labeau 56'; Diaw (yellow card) 64'; Cherni (yellow card) 73'; Bobichon 82'	Stadium: Stade Francis-Le Blé; Attendance: 1,403; Referee: (France) Faouzi Benchabane

2 March 2024 27	Laval	1–1	Amiens SC	Laval
19:00 CET (UTC+1)	Kadile 38'	Report	Gene (yellow card) 85'; Boya 86'	Stadium: Stade Francis Le Basser; Attendance: 7,796; Referee: (France) Olivier Thual

11 March 2024 28	Grenoble	0–2	Laval	Grenoble
20:45 CET (UTC+1)	Rigo (yellow card) 36'; Diarra (yellow card) 53'; Sanyang (yellow card) 76'	Report	Pagis 31'; Labeau (yellow card) 52' (goal) 73' (pen.); Samassa (yellow card) 66'; Diaw (yellow card) 81'	Stadium: Stade des Alpes; Attendance: 5,168; Referee: (France) Nicolas Rainville

16 March 2024 29	Laval	1–2	Dunkerque	Laval
19:00 CET (UTC+1)	Diaw (yellow card) 56'; Thomas 87'	Report	Courtet 9'; Anziani (yellow card) 35'; Youssouf (yellow card) 43' (goal) 44'; Baghdadi (yellow card) 59'; Koné (yellow card) 76'	Stadium: Stade Francis Le Basser; Attendance: 7,868; Referee: (France) Mikael Lesage

30 March 2024 30	Laval	1–2	Bastia	Laval
19:00 CET (UTC+1)	Pagis (yellow card) 34'; Labeau (yellow card) 37' (goal) 57'; Gonçalves (yellow card) 90+4'	Report	Keita (yellow card) 24'; Janneh (yellow card) 35'; Conte (yellow card) 47' (goal) 85'; Bianchini 52'	Stadium: Stade Francis Le Basser; Attendance: 8,276; Referee: (France) Antoine Valnet

6 April 2024 31	Angers	1–1	Laval	Angers
19:00 CET (UTC+1)	Hountondji (yellow card) 12'; Abdelli 87' (pen.); Lefort (yellow card) 90+3'	Report	Pagis 4'; Diaw (yellow card) 22'; Roye (yellow card) 26'; Baldé (red card) 85'	Stadium: Stade Raymond Kopa; Attendance: 16,785; Referee: (France) Aurélien Petit

13 April 2024 32	Laval	0–3	Annecy	Laval
19:00 CET (UTC+1)	Pagis (yellow card) 45'	Report	Camara 13'; Kandil 16'; Djoco 35'; Lajugie (yellow card) 57'	Stadium: Stade Francis Le Basser; Attendance: 8,313; Referee: (France) Thierry Bouille

20 April 2024 33	Pau	3–0	Laval	Bizanos
19:00 CET (UTC+1)	Sylla 3' 32'; Beusnard 65'; Boutaïb (yellow card) 74'	Report	Diaw (yellow card) 27'; Tchokounté (yellow card) 35'	Stadium: Nouste Camp; Attendance: 3,516; Referee: (France) Azzedine Souifi

23 April 2024 34	Auxerre	4–0	Laval	Auxerre
20:45 CET (UTC+1)	Irvyn Lomami 4' (o.g.); Ayé 13' 33'; Jubal (yellow card) 67'; Danois 90'	Report	Bobichon (red card) 45+2'	Stadium: Stade de l'Abbé-Deschamps; Attendance: 16,698; Referee: (France) Romain Lissorgue

27 April 2024 35	Laval	1–0	Bordeaux	Laval
19:00 CET	Baldé (yellow card) 14'; Pagis 61'; Sanna (yellow card) 79'; Cherni (yellow card) 90+4'	Report	Weissbeck (yellow card) 38' (yellow-red card) 74'; Ihnatenko (yellow card) 44'	Stadium: Stade Francis Le Basser; Attendance: 7,302; Referee: (France) Mikael Lesage

3 May 2024 36	Caen	1–0	Laval	Caen
20:00 CET	Thomas (yellow card) 58'; Brahimi 86'	Report	Baldé (yellow card) 70'	Stadium: Stade Michel d'Ornano; Attendance: 18,348; Referee: (France) Gaël Angoula

10 May 2024 37	Laval	1–2	Troyes	Laval
20:45 CET (UTC+1)	Diaw (yellow card) 3'; Baldé (yellow card) 10'; Cherni 34'; Yohan Tavares (yellow card) 74'; Adéoti (yellow card) 81'	Report	Elisor 46'; Ibrahim Traoré 69'; Ripart (yellow card) 90+3'	Stadium: Stade Francis Le Basser; Attendance: 8,005; Referee: (France) Azzedine Souifi

17 May 2024 38	Guingamp	0–1	Laval	Guingamp
20:45		Report	Diaw (yellow card) 33'; Cherni 45+3'; Samassa (yellow card) 90'	Stadium: Stade de Roudourou; Attendance: 10,607; Referee: (France) Mickaël Leleu

=== Coupe de France ===
18 November 2023 Seventh round	US Provin	0–5	Laval	Villeneuve-d'Ascq
14:00 CET (UTC+1)		Report		Stadium: Stadium Lille Métropole

9 December 2023 Eighth round	US Saint-Philbert-de-Grand-Lieu	1–2	Laval	Nantes
14:30 CET (UTC+1)	Youssef Oumar Hima Souley 10'; Steven Ngampika (yellow card) 19'	Report	Bobichon 65'; Kadile (yellow card) 65'; Tchokounté 86'	Stadium: Stade Marcel-Saupin; Attendance: 1,921; Referee: (France) Maxime Jamet

7 January 2024 Round of 64	Dieppe	0–4	Laval	Saint-Aubin-sur-Scie
17:30 CET (UTC+1)	Alexander Borja (yellow card) 33'; Noah Trophardy (yellow card) 67'	Report	Bobichon 8'; Kadile 49'; Sanna 63'; Tchokounté 71'	Stadium: Stade Jean Dasnias; Attendance: 4,227; Referee: (France) Thierry Bouille

20 January 2024 Round of 32	Nantes	0–1	Laval	Nantes
17:30 CET (UTC+1)	Cömert (yellow card) 90+5'	Report	Cherni (yellow card) 53'; Tchokounté 60'	Stadium: Stade de la Beaujoire; Attendance: 31,962; Referee: (France) Ruddy Buquet

7 February 2024 Round of 16	Le Puy	2–1	Laval	Le Puy-en-Velay
20:30 CET (UTC+1)	Jules Meyer 25' 90+5' (pen.); Renald Xhemo (yellow card) 84'	Report	Diaw (yellow card) 32'; Thomas (yellow card) 79'; Tchokounté 85'; Lebeau (yellow card) 90'; Baldé (yellow card) 90+3'	Stadium: Stade Charles Massot; Attendance: Thomas Léonard; Referee: (France) 4,045
