= 2022–23 Stade Lavallois season =

Stade Lavallois
2022–23 season
- Chairman: Laurent Lairy
- Manager: Olivier Frapolli
- Stadium: Stade Francis Le Basser
- Ligue 2: 15th
- Coupe de France: Seventh round
- Top goalscorer: League: Simon Elisor (8); All: Simon Elisor (8)
Home colours	Away colours

The 2022–23 season was the 121st in the history of Stade Lavallois and their first season back in the second division since 2017. The club participated in Ligue 2 and the Coupe de France.

== Players ==
As of 31 January 2023.

Note: Flags indicate national team as defined under FIFA eligibility rules; some limited exceptions apply. Players may hold more than one non-FIFA nationality.

No.	Pos.	Nation	Player
1	GK	FRA	Maxime Hautbois
2	DF	FRA	Kévin Perrot
3	DF	CGO	Marvin Baudry
4	MF	FRA	Jimmy Roye
5	MF	FRA	Julien Maggiotti (on loan from Charleroi)
6	MF	FRA	Sam Sanna (on loan from Toulouse)
7	DF	FRA	Bryan Gonçalves
8	MF	FRA	Kevin Tapoko
9	FW	GLP	Geoffray Durbant
10	MF	FRA	Ryan Ferhaoui
11	FW	CIV	Kader N'Chobi
12	DF	GUI	Yasser Baldé
14	FW	FRA	Simon Elisor (on loan from Seraing)
15	DF	SEN	Elhadji Pape Diaw (on loan from Rukh Lviv)
16	GK	FRA	Alexis Sauvage

No.	Pos.	Nation	Player
18	DF	FRA	Rémy Duterte
20	FW	FRA	Sébastien Da Silva
21	FW	FRA	Steven Nsimba
22	DF	FRA	Pierrick Cros
23	DF	POR	Yohan Tavares
24	FW	ALG	Zakaria Naidji
25	DF	FRA	Edson Seidou
27	MF	BEN	Jordan Adéoti
28	MF	FRA	Antonin Bobichon
29	FW	GUI	Dembo Sylla
33	FW	ESP	Junior Armando Mendes
39	DF	FRA	Anthony Gonçalves
40	GK	FRA	Théo Chatelain
—	FW	FRA	François-Xavier Tamuzo

== Pre-season and friendlies ==
Win Draw Loss Fixtures

1 July 2022 Friendly	Laval (France)	1–1	(France) Concarneau	Fougères
18:00 CEST (UTC+2)	Roye 24'		Gboho 62'	Stadium: Stade Jean Manfredi

9 July 2022 Friendly	Laval (France)	1–2	(France) Guingamp	Dinan
17:00 CEST (UTC+2)	Durbant 42'		Lemonnier 54'; Baaloudj 63'	Stadium: Stade du Clos Gastel

13 July 2022 Friendly	Laval (France)	4–2	(France) Stade Briochin	Château-Gontier
19:00 CEST (UTC+2)	N'Chobi 16'; Durbant 24'; Perrot 51'; Baldé 83'		Sow 41'; Janno 61'	Stadium: Stade de Football du Pavé

17 July 2022 Friendly	Angers (France)	0–0	(France) Laval	Segré
18:00 CEST (UTC+2)				Stadium: Stade de la Route de Pouancé

20 July 2022 Friendly	Laval (France)	3–1	(France) Saint-Maur	Lassay-les-Châteaux
18:00 CEST (UTC+2)	Baldé 70'; Sylla 75'; Naidji 78'	Report	Tango 20'	Attendance: 500

23 July 2022 Friendly	Laval (France)	3–1	(France) Cholet	Ancenis
18:00 CEST (UTC+2)	Roye 19'; Adéoti 45'; Maggiotti 70' (pen.)	Report	Jarju 6'	Stadium: Stade de la Davrays

10 December 2022 Friendly	Quevilly-Rouen (France)	1–1	(France) Laval	Le Petit-Quevilly
16:00 CET (UTC+1)				Stadium: Stade Robert Diochon

16 December 2022 Friendly	Nantes (France)	1–1	(France) Laval	Nantes
15:30 CET (UTC+1)				Stadium: Stade de la Beaujoire

21 December 2022 Friendly	Angers (France)	2–1	(France) Laval	Angers, France
15:00 CET (UTC+1)	Hunou 73', 84'		Sylla 90'	Stadium: Stade Raymond Kopa

== Competitions ==
=== Overall record ===
Competition	First match	Last match	Starting round	Final position	Record							
Competition	First match	Last match	Starting round	Final position	Pld	W	D	L	GF	GA	GD	Win %
Ligue 2	30 July 2022	2 June 2023	Matchday 1	15th	38	14	4	20	44	56	−12	36.84
Coupe de France	29 October 2022		Seventh round	Seventh round	1	0	1	0	1	1	+0	0.00
Total					39	14	5	20	45	57	−12	35.90

Source: Soccerway

=== Ligue 2 ===
==== League table ====
Pos	Team	Pld	W	D	L	GF	GA	GD	Pts	Promotion or Relegation
13	Pau	38	12	11	15	40	52	−12	47	
14	Rodez	38	11	13	14	39	44	−5	46	
15	Laval	38	14	4	20	44	56	−12	46	
16	Valenciennes	38	10	15	13	42	49	−7	45	
17	Annecy	38	11	12	15	39	51	−12	45	Spared from relegation

Source: Ligue 2
Rules for classification: 1) Points; 2) Goal difference; 3) Number of goals scored; 4) Head-to-head goal difference; 5) Fair play points

==== Results summary ====
Overall								Home						Away					
Pld	W	D	L	GF	GA	GD	Pts	W	D	L	GF	GA	GD	W	D	L	GF	GA	GD
37	13	4	20	41	55	−14	43	9	2	8	26	24	+2	4	2	12	15	31	−16

Last updated: 26 May 2023.
Source: Ligue 2

==== Results by round ====
Round	1	2	3	4	5	6	7
Ground	A	H	A	H	A	H	A
Result	W	L	W	D	L	L	L
Position	3	10	6	6	8	12	

Updated to match(es) played on 26 May 2023. Source: Ligue 2
A = Away; H = Home; W = Win; D = Draw; L = Loss

==== Matches ====
The league fixtures were announced on 17 June 2022.

30 July 2022 1	Bastia	0–2	Laval	Furiani
19:00 CEST (UTC+2)		Report	Naidji 16', 63'	Stadium: Stade Armand Cesari; Attendance: 8,000; Referee: Nicolas Rainville

6 August 2022 2	Laval	1–2	Guingamp	Laval
19:00 CEST (UTC+2)	A. Gonçalves 5'	Report	Barthelmé 56'; Livolant 74'	Stadium: Stade Francis Le Basser; Attendance: 8,813; Referee: Faouzi Benchabane

13 August 2022 3	Annecy	0–1	Laval	Annecy
19:00 CEST (UTC+2)		Report	Maggiotti 14'	Stadium: Parc des Sports; Attendance: 4,600; Referee: Antoine Valnet

20 August 2022 4	Laval	3–3	Metz	Laval
19:00 CEST (UTC+2)	Naidji 33', 75'; Diaw 90+2'	Report	Niane 21'; Mikelbrencis 24'; Udol 35'	Stadium: Stade Francis Le Basser; Attendance: 7,782; Referee: Benjamin Lepaysant

27 August 2022 5	Nîmes	1–0	Laval	Nîmes
19:00 CEST (UTC+2)	Koné 54'	Report		Stadium: Stade des Costières; Attendance: 2,221; Referee: Azzedine Souifi

30 August 2022 6	Laval	1–3	Le Havre	Laval
20:45 CEST (UTC+2)	Diaw 32'	Report	Kitala 49'; Thiaré 71'; Richardson 78'	Stadium: Stade Francis Le Basser; Attendance: 8,201; Referee: Aurélien Petit

2 September 2022 7	Sochaux	4–1	Laval	Montbéliard
20:45 CEST (UTC+2)	Weissbeck 45+2'; Doumbia 71'; Mauricio 80'; Do Couto 82'	Report	Maggiotti 28'	Stadium: Stade Auguste Bonal; Attendance: 9,311; Referee: William Toulliou

10 September 2022 8	Laval	0–1	Pau	Laval
20:45 CEST (UTC+2)	Duterte (yellow card) 90+1'	Report	Yattara (yellow card) 31'; Sow (yellow card) 45'; D'Almeida (yellow card) 76'; Kouassi (yellow card) 82'; Bassouamina 87'	Stadium: Stade Francis Le Basser; Attendance: 5,875; Referee: Antoine Valnet

17 September 2022 9	Quevilly-Rouen	1–3	Laval	Caen
19:00 CEST (UTC+2)	Gbelle (yellow card) 27'; Diedhiou 34'; Cissokho (red card) 69'	Report	Durbant 7' (pen.); Maggiotti 10', 74'; Diaw (yellow card) 33'; Sylla (yellow card) 38'; A. Gonçalves (yellow card) 51'; B. Goncalves (yellow card) 58'; Naidji (yellow card) 54'; Mouali (yellow card) 90+2'	Stadium: Stade Michel d'Ornano; Attendance: 3,000; Referee: Remi Landry

3 October 2022 10	Laval	1–2	Bordeaux	Laval
20:45 CEST (UTC+2)	Maggiotti 56'; Mouali (yellow card) 88'; Durbant (yellow card) 90+3'; B. Gonçalves (yellow card) 90+4'	Report	Maja 5'; Ihnatenko (yellow card) 53'; Elis 69'; N'Simba (yellow card) 90+4'	Stadium: Stade Francis Le Basser; Attendance: 8,546; Referee: Alexandre Perreau Niel

8 October 2022 11	Grenoble	3–2	Laval	Grenoble
19:00 CEST (UTC+2)	Sanyang 3', 10'; Gaspar 6'	Report	Maggiotti 26' (pen.); Seidou 44'; Baudry (yellow card) 78'	Stadium: Stade des Alpes; Attendance: 4,449; Referee: Azzédine Souifi

15 October 2022 12	Laval	4–0	Caen	Laval
19:00 CEST (UTC+2)	Baldé 13'; Durbant 31'; Naidji (yellow card) 33'; Sanna 57'; Adéoti 87'	Report	Thomas (yellow card) 61'; Abdi (yellow card) 88'	Stadium: Stade Francis Le Basser; Attendance: 8,702; Referee: William Toulliou

22 October 2022 13	Paris FC	0–0	Laval	Paris
19:00 CEST (UTC+2)		Report	Baldé (yellow card) 5'	Stadium: Stade Sébastien Charléty; Attendance: 2,568; Referee: Abdelatif Kherradji

5 November 2022 14	Laval	2–1	Niort	Laval
19:00 CET (UTC+1)	Roye 14'; Maggiotti 59'	Report	Sagna 24'	Stadium: Stade Francis Le Basser; Attendance: 6,717; Referee: Mikael Lesage

12 November 2022 15	Laval	1–0	Valenciennes	Laval
19:00 CET (UTC+)	B. Gonçalves (red card) 17'; Tavares (red card) 34'; Baudry 41'; Maggiotti (yellow card) 67'	Report	Berthomier (yellow card) 49'	Stadium: Stade Francis Le Basser; Attendance: 6,823; Referee: Benjamin Lepaysant

26 December 2022 16	Dijon	5–0	Laval	Dijon
21:00 CET (UTC+1)	Jacob (yellow card) 22'; Fofana (yellow card) 23'; Cros 27' (o.g.); Soumaré 30', (penalty scored) 88'; Le Bihan 37', (yellow card) 45'; Silva 63'	Report	Sanna (yellow card) 14'; Duterte (yellow card) 65'; Baudry (yellow card) 71'	Stadium: Stade Gaston Gérard; Attendance: 3,500; Referee: Abdelatif Kherradji

30 December 2022 17	Laval	0–3	Amiens	Laval
19:00 CET (UTC+1)	Baudry (yellow card) 3'	Report	Kakuta 23'; Cissé 54'; Xantippe (yellow card) 67'; Bénet 83'	Stadium: Stade Francis Le Basser; Attendance: 6,779; Referee: Romain Lissorgue

10 January 2023 18	Saint-Étienne	1–0	Laval	Saint-Étienne
20:45 CET (UTC+1)	Cafaro 59', (yellow card) 60'; Bouchouari (yellow card) 65'	Report	N'Chobi (yellow card) 72'	Stadium: Stade Geoffroy-Guichard; Attendance: 13,603; Referee: Olivier Thual

13 January 2023 19	Laval	3–1	Rodez	Laval
19:00 CET (UTC+1)	Durbant 16'; B. Gonçalves (red card) 39'; Bobichon 49'; Seidou (yellow card) 62'; Baudry 78'	Report	Depres (red card) 34'; Rajot (yellow card) 45'; Pembélé (yellow card) 50'; Mouyokolo (yellow card) 55'; Mendes 75'	Stadium: Stade Francis Le Basser; Attendance: 5,252; Referee: Rémi Landry

28 January 2023 20	Caen	0–0	Laval	Caen
19:00 CET (UTC+1)		Report	Baudry (yellow card) 80'	Stadium: Stade Michel d'Ornano; Attendance: 12,912; Referee: Gaël Angoula

31 January 2023 21	Laval	1–0	Dijon	Laval
20:45 CET (UTC+1)	Sanna (yellow card) 22'; Durbant 66'	Report	Pi (yellow card) 26'; Ndong (yellow card) 62'; Jacob (yellow card) 90+2'	Stadium: Stade Francis Le Basser; Attendance: 5,585; Referee: Faouzi Benchabane

3 February 2023 22	Valenciennes	3–1	Laval	Valenciennes
20:45 CET (UTC+2)	Grbić (penalty scored) 12'; Diliberto 17'; Ayité 90+3'	Report	Duterte (yellow card) 16'; Sylla (yellow card) 34'; Naidji 82'; Roye (yellow card) 86'	Stadium: Stade Nungesser; Attendance: 5,369; Referee: Romain Lissorgue

11 February 2023 23	Laval	1–1	Annecy	Laval
19:00 CET (UTC+1)	Naidji 7'; Elisor (yellow card) 55'; Durbant (yellow card) 86'	Report	Pajot (yellow card) 23'; Mouanga 28'; Bastian (yellow card) 71'	Stadium: Stade Francis Le Basser; Attendance: 5,708; Referee: Karim Abed

18 February 2023 24	Pau	0–1	Laval	Pau
19:00 CET (UTC+1)	Ruiz (yellow card) 16'; Saivet (yellow card) 24'; Abzi (yellow card) 85'	Report	Ruiz 40' (o.g.); Baudry (yellow card) 43'; Tavares (yellow card) 88'	Stadium: Nouste Camp; Attendance: 2,931; Referee: William Toulliou

25 February 2023 25	Laval	0–1	Quevilly-Rouen	Laval
19:00 CET (UTC+1)	Baudry (yellow card) 63'; Durbant (yellow card) 68'; Adéoti (yellow card) 78'; Da Silva (yellow card) 90+1'	Report	Pierret (yellow card) 42'; Sangaré 70'; Cissokho (yellow card) 78'	Stadium: Stade Francis Le Basser; Attendance: 5,628; Referee: Hakim Ben El Hadj

4 March 2023 26	Le Havre	2–1	Laval	Le Havre
19:00 CET (UTC+1)	Joujou 16'; Sangante (yellow card) 32', (goal) 79'; Grandsir (yellow card) 40'; Thiaré (yellow card) 72'	Report	A. Gonçalves (yellow card) 8'; Adéoti 10', (yellow card) 28'; Bobichon (yellow card) 66'	Stadium: Stade Océane; Attendance: 8,074; Referee: Faouzi Benchabane

11 March 2023 27	Laval	1–2	Paris FC	Laval
19:00 CET (UTC+1)	Elisor 18'; Ferhaoui (yellow card) 64'	Report	Kebbal 11'; Boutaïb (yellow card) 59'; Guilavogui 60'	Stadium: Stade Francis Le Basser; Attendance: 5,680; Referee: Antoine Valnet

18 March 2023 28	Niort	3–2	Laval	Niort
19:00 CET (UTC+1)	Conté (yellow card) 3' (yellow-red card) 90+7'; Kaboré (yellow card) 15'; Boutobba 45+2'; Renel 72'; Rocheteau (penalty scored) 88'; Passi (yellow card) 90+5'	Report	Bobichon 40'; B. Gonçalves (yellow card) 79' (yellow-red card) 90+7'; Elisor 83'; Seidou (yellow card) 88'	Stadium: Stade René Gaillard; Attendance: 2,213; Referee: Pierre Legat

1 April 2023 29	Metz	1–0	Laval	Metz
19:00 CET (UTC+1)	Mikautadze 48'; Maïga (yellow card) 63'	Report	Tavares (yellow card) 51'; Bobichon (yellow card) 85'	Stadium: Stade Saint-Symphorien; Attendance: 15,342; Referee: Rémi Landry

8 April 2023 30	Laval	0–1	Grenoble	Laval
19:00 CEST (UTC+2)	Naidji (yellow card) 31'; Nsimba (yellow card) 67'; Roye (yellow card) 90'	Report	Phaëton 7'; Paquiez (yellow card) 88'; Tell (yellow card) 89'	Stadium: Stade Francis Le Basser; Attendance: 6,481; Referee: Olivier Thual

15 April 2023 31	Rodez	1–0	Laval	Rodez
19:00 CEST (UTC+2)	Valério (yellow card) 25'; Corredor 36'; Depres (yellow card) 90'	Report	Bobichon (yellow card) 19'; A. Gonçalves (yellow card) 38'; Tapoko (yellow card) 90+4'	Stadium: Stade Paul-Lignon; Attendance: 2,701; Referee: Antoine Valnet

22 April 2023 32	Laval	2–1	Sochaux	Laval
19:00 CEST (UTC+2)	Elisor 7'; Baldé (yellow card) 24'; Bobichon 29'	Report	Aaneba (yellow card) 12'; Kanouté (yellow card) 50'; Doumbia 85'	Stadium: Stade Francis Le Basser; Attendance: 7,771; Referee: Karim Abed

29 April 2023 33	Guingamp	3–1	Laval	Guingamp
19:00 CET (UTC+1)	Livolant 4' (pen.); Roux (yellow card) 59'; Sivis 69'; Courtet 72'; Merghem (yellow card) 79'; Louiserre (yellow card) 81'	Report	Elisor 35'; B. Gonçalves (yellow card) 50'	Stadium: Stade de Roudourou; Attendance: 9,860; Referee: Rémi Landry

6 May 2023 34	Laval	2–1	Bastia	Laval
19:00 CEST (UTC+2)	Elisor 17', 25' (pen.); Seidou (yellow card) 46'; Tapoko (yellow card) 80'	Report	Palun (yellow card) 63'; Magri 72', (yellow card) 78' (yellow-red card) 87'; Ndiaye (yellow card) 77'; Guidi (yellow card) 77'	Stadium: Stade Francis Le Basser; Attendance: 7,358; Referee: Azzédine Souifi

13 May 2023 35	Laval	2–1	Saint-Étienne	Laval
19:00 CEST (UTC+2)	Elisor (penalty scored) 31'; Bobichon 50'; Tavares (yellow card) 90+4'	Report	Chambost 38'; Nkounkou (yellow card) 68'	Stadium: Stade Francis Le Basser; Attendance: 8,969; Referee: Abdelatif Kherradji

20 May 2023 36	Bordeaux	3–0	Laval	Bordeaux
14:45 CEST (UTC+2)	Barbet 4'; Davistashvili 32'; Maja (penalty missed) 45', (penalty missed) 45+3'; Gregersen 49'; Fransérgio (yellow card) 84'	Report	Bobichon (yellow card) 48'; Adéoti (yellow card) 78'	Stadium: Matmut Atlantique; Attendance: 25,331; Referee: Romain Lissorgue

26 May 2023 37	Laval	2–0	Nîmes	Laval
20:45 CEST (UTC+2)	Elisor 18'; Naidji 36'; Sylla (yellow card) 46'; Roye (yellow card) 65'	Report	Ambri (yellow card) 40'; Fofana (yellow card) 67'	Stadium: Stade Francis Le Basser; Attendance: 8,673; Referee: Benjamin Lepaysant

2 June 2023 38	Amiens	1–2	Laval	Amiens
20:45 CEST (UTC+2)	Barry (yellow card) 10'; Cissé 53'	Report	Sylla (yellow card) 34'; Bobichon (yellow card) 62', (goal) 68'; Diaw 90+4'	Stadium: Stade de la Licorne; Attendance: 12,300; Referee: Pierre Legat

=== Coupe de France ===
29 October 2022 Seventh round	Orvault SF	1–1 (6–5 p)	Laval	Orvault
15:00 CEST (UTC+2)	Kersuzan 32'	Report	Durbant 84'	Stadium: Stade de Gagné; Attendance: 2,100; Referee: Léo Beulet
