= Peter Ouaneh =

Congolese-born French footballer (born 1998)

Personal information
- Date of birth: 4 April 1998 (age 28)
- Place of birth: Kinshasa, DR Congo
- Height: 1.84 m (6 ft 0 in)
- Position: Centre-back

Team information
- Current team: UTA Arad
- Number: 15

Youth career
- 2008–2011: CPBB Rennes
- 2011–2013: Rennes
- 2013–2014: CPBB Rennes
- 2014–2017: Lorient

Senior career*
Years	Team	Apps	(Gls)
2015–2019	Lorient B	71	(4)
2018–2020	Lorient	1	(0)
2019–2020	→ Le Puy (loan)	14	(0)
2020–2021	Concarneau	33	(4)
2021–2023	Châteauroux	41	(0)
2021–2023	Châteauroux B	3	(0)
2023–2026	Laval	51	(0)
2024–2025	Laval B	7	(0)
2026–	UTA Arad	12	(0)

International career
2015	France U17	1	(0)
2015–2016	France U18	6	(0)
2016	France U19	3	(0)
- * Club domestic league appearances and goals as of 6 November 2026

Peter Ouaneh (born 4 April 1998) is a professional footballer who plays as a centre-back for Liga I club UTA Arad. Born in DR Congo, he is a former France youth international.

== Club career ==
On 9 May 2018, Ouaneh signed his first professional contract with Lorient. Ouaneh made his professional debut Lorient in a 1-0 Coupe de la Ligue win over Valenciennes on 14 August 2018. On 17 October 2019, Ouaneh joined Championnat National club Le Puy on loan for the rest of the season. In June 2020, Ouaneh joined fellow Championnat National club Concarneau, this time on a permanent deal signing a two-year contract.

On 22 June 2021, Ouaneh signed for Châteauroux.

== International career ==
Ouaneh was born in Kinshasa, Congo and moved to France at a young age. He is a youth international for France, having represented the France U18s at the 2015 FIFA U-17 World Cup. In March 2023, he was selected by Sébastien Desabre as one of the reserves for the DR Congo national team.

== Career statistics ==
=== Club ===
As of match played 6 November 2026

Appearances and goals by club, season and competition
Club	Season	League			National cup (Note: Includes Coupe de France, Cupa României)		Europe		Other		Total	
Club	Season	Division	Apps	Goals	Apps	Goals	Apps	Goals	Apps	Goals	Apps	Goals
Lorient B	2015–16	CFA	4	0	—		—		—		4	0
Lorient B	2016–17	CFA	8	0	—		—		—		8	0
Lorient B	2017–18	Championnat National 2	28	0	—		—		—		28	0
Lorient B	2018–19	Championnat National 2	25	4	—		—		—		25	4
Lorient B	2019–20	Championnat National 2	6	0	—		—		—		6	0
Lorient B	Total		71	4	—		—		—		71	4
Lorient	2018–19	Ligue 2	1	0	0	0	—		1 (Note: Appearances in Coupe de la Ligue)	0	2	0
Le Puy (loan)	2019–20	Championnat National	14	0	3	0	—		—		17	0
Concarneau	2020–21	Championnat National	33	4	1	0	—		—		34	4
Châteauroux	2021–22	Championnat National	20	0	1	0	—		—		21	0
Châteauroux	2022–23	Championnat National	21	0	5	2	—		—		26	2
Châteauroux	Total		41	0	6	2	—		—		47	2
Châteauroux B	2021–22	Championnat National 3	2	0	—		—		—		2	0
Châteauroux B	2022–23	Championnat National 3	1	0	—		—		—		1	0
Châteauroux B	Total		3	0	—		—		—		3	0
Laval	2023–24	Ligue 2	18	0	1	0	—		—		19	0
Laval	2024–25	Ligue 2	9	0	0	0	—		—		9	0
Laval	2025–26	Ligue 2	24	0	4	0	—		2 (Note: Appearances in Ligue 2 promotion/relegation play-offs)	0	1	0
Laval	Total		51	0	5	0	—		2	0	58	0
Laval B	2023–24	Championnat National 3	3	0	—		—		—		3	0
Laval B	2024–25	Championnat National 3	1	0	—		—		—		1	0
Laval B	2025–26	Championnat National 3	3	0	—		—		—		3	0
Laval B	Total		7	0	—		—		—		7	0
UTA Arad	2026–27	Liga I	12	0	2	0	—		—		14	0
Career total			233	8	17	2	—		3	0	253	10

== Honours ==
Individual

- Championnat National Team of the Season: 2020–21
