= Hautbois =

Hautbois may refer to:

- Hautbois (instrument), the original French term for oboe
- Hautbois strawberry, best known as the Musk strawberry
- Maxime Hautbois (born 1991), French footballer
- Little Hautbois, a hamlet in Norfolk, England
- Great Hautbois, a hamlet in Norfolk, England
