= Jimmy Roye =

French footballer (born 1988)

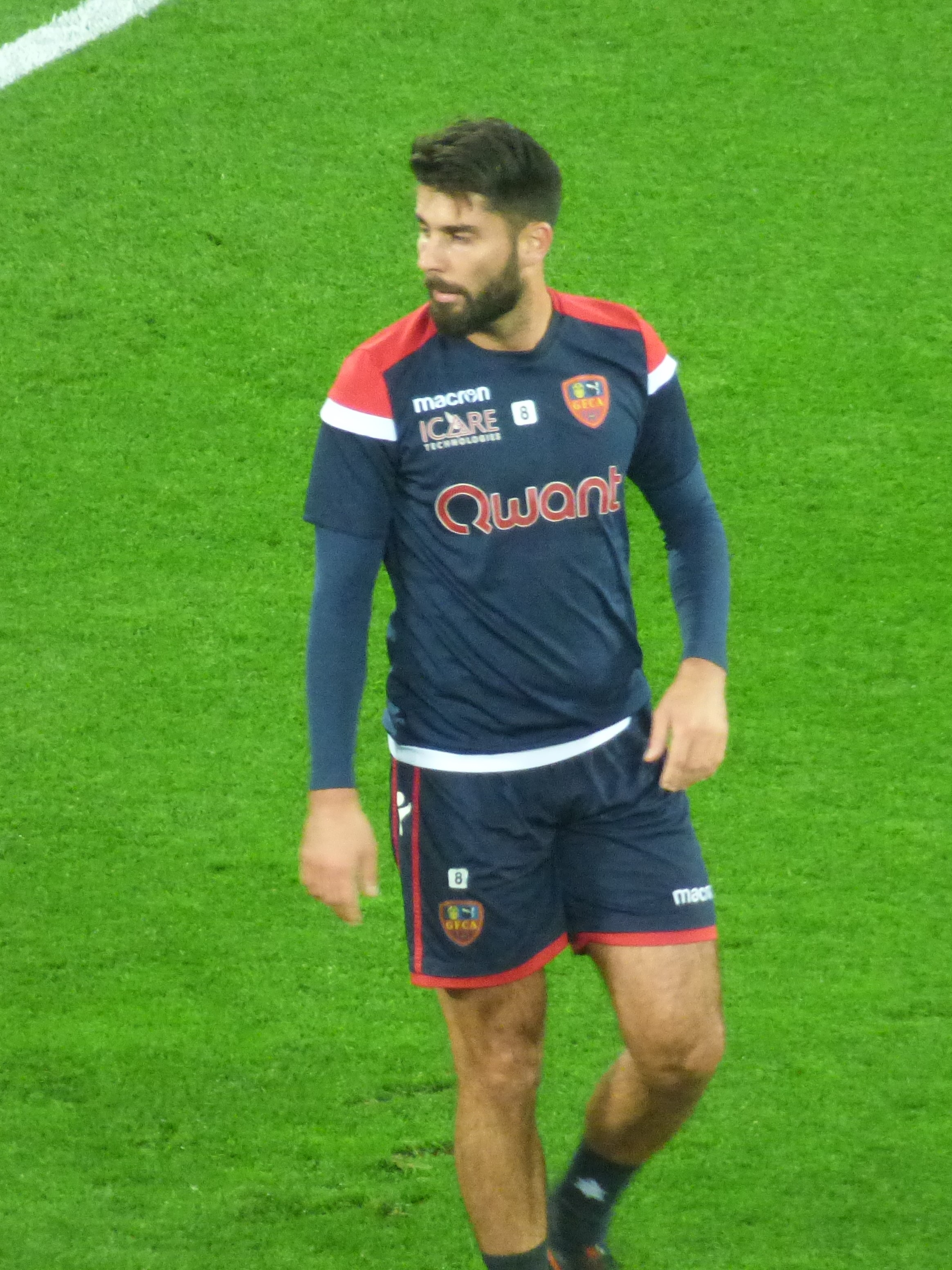
- Roye with Gazélec Ajaccio in 2018

Personal information
- Date of birth: 8 September 1988 (age 38)
- Place of birth: Paris, France
- Height: 1.74 m (5 ft 9 in)
- Position: Central midfielder

Youth career
- 2003–2006: Nice
- 2006–2008: Amiens

Senior career*
Years	Team	Apps	(Gls)
2008–2009	Calais	33	(5)
2009–2011	Paris FC	73	(10)
2011–2018	Chamois Niortais	246	(44)
2018–2019	Gazélec Ajaccio	37	(4)
2019–2021	Red Star	52	(2)
2021–2025	Laval	129	(8)
- * Club domestic league appearances and goals

Jimmy Roye (born 8 September 1988) is a French former professional footballer who played as a central midfielder. He has played for Amiens, Calais, Chamois Niortais, Paris, Gazélec Ajaccio, Red Star and Laval.

== Career statistics ==
As of match played on 7 October 2023

Appearances and goals by club, season and competition
Club	Season	League			National cup		League cup		Other		Total	
Club	Season	Division	Apps	Goals	Apps	Goals	Apps	Goals	Apps	Goals	Apps	Goals
Calais	2008–09	National	33	5	5	8	—		—		38	13
Paris FC	2009–10	National	36	6	1	0	—		—		37	6
Paris FC	2010–11	National	37	4	5	1	—		—		42	5
Paris FC	Total		73	10	6	1	—		—		79	11
Chamois Niortais	2011–12	National	35	10	5	1	—		—		40	11
Chamois Niortais	2012–13	Ligue 2	34	8	2	0	2	0	—		38	8
Chamois Niortais	2013–14	Ligue 2	37	6	4	2	1	0	—		42	8
Chamois Niortais	2014–15	Ligue 2	34	6	2	0	1	0	—		37	6
Chamois Niortais	2015–16	Ligue 2	36	4	3	2	1	0	—		40	6
Chamois Niortais	2016–17	Ligue 2	37	5	4	0	1	0	—		42	5
Chamois Niortais	2017–18	Ligue 2	33	5	3	1	1	0	—		37	6
Chamois Niortais	Total		246	44	23	6	7	0	—		276	50
Gazélec Ajaccio	2018–19	Ligue 2	37	4	2	1	0	0	2	0	41	5
Red Star	2019–20	National	20	1	4	1	1	0	—		25	2
Red Star	2020–21	National	32	1	4	1	—		—		36	2
Red Star	Total		52	2	8	2	1	0	—		61	4
Laval	2021–22	National	31	3	2	0	—		—		33	3
Laval	2022–23	Ligue 2	36	1	1	0	—		—		37	1
Laval	2023–24	Ligue 2	10	1	0	0	—		—		10	1
Laval	Total		77	5	3	0	0	0	0	0	80	5
Career total			518	70	47	18	8	0	2	0	575	88

== Honours ==
Laval

- Championnat National: 2021–22
