= Moudja Sié Ouattara =

Ivorian footballer (born 2002)

Personal information
- Date of birth: 20 May 2002 (age 24)
- Place of birth: Bouaké, Ivory Coast
- Height: 1.71 m (5 ft 7 in)
- Position: Winger

Youth career
- 2013–2017: Paris FC
- 2017–2021: Bordeaux

Senior career*
Years	Team	Apps	(Gls)
2019–2022	Bordeaux B	33	(7)
2022	Bordeaux	0	(0)
2022–2024	Cholet	47	(1)
2024–2026	Tondela	30	(2)
- * Club domestic league appearances and goals as of 18 May 2026

Moudja Sié Ouattara (born 20 May 2002), also known as Ouattara Moudjatovic, is an Ivorian professional footballer who plays as a winger.

== Career ==
Having joined from Paris FC in 2017, Ouattara signed his first professional contract for Bordeaux in June 2020, a deal lasting until June 2023. On 2 January 2022, he made his professional debut for the club in a 3–0 Coupe de France loss to Brest.

On 13 June 2022, Ouattara signed for Championnat National side Cholet.

On 26 August 2024, Ouattara signed a two-year contract with Tondela in Portugal. Tondela announced his name as Ouattara Moudjatovic.
