= Éric Élisor =

French footballer (born 1971)

Personal information
- Full name: Éric Élisor
- Date of birth: 2 April 1971 (age 55)
- Place of birth: Poitiers, France
- Height: 1.80 m (5 ft 11 in)
- Position: Midfielder

Senior career*
Years	Team	Apps	(Gls)
1997–2000	Trélissac FC	76	(6)
2000–2002	FC Istres	49	(3)
2002–2003	Stade Beaucairois	23	(0)
2003–2004	ES Vitrolles	25	(2)
2004–2005	US Le Pontet	3	(0)
- * Club domestic league appearances and goals

Éric Élisor (born 11 April 1971) is a French former professional footballer who played as a midfielder. He is now a youth football trainer.

His son Simon Elisor is also a professional footballer. His daughter Salomé Elisor plays in French Division 1 and was a French youth international.
