= Titouan Thomas =

French footballer (born 2002)

Personal information
- Full name: Titouan Christophe Gérard Thomas
- Date of birth: 12 January 2002 (age 24)
- Place of birth: Saint-Brieuc, France
- Height: 1.83 m (6 ft 0 in)
- Position: Midfielder

Team information
- Current team: Fleury
- Number: 12

Youth career
- 2007–2010: AS Plélo
- 2010–2012: La Châtelaudrinaise
- 2012–2015: Guingamp
- 2015–2017: Stade Briochin
- 2017–2018: Lyon

Senior career*
Years	Team	Apps	(Gls)
2018–2022	Lyon B	50	(33)
2022–2023	Estoril	0	(0)
2022–2023	→ ADO Den Haag (loan)	24	(12)
2023–2026	Laval	86	(5)
2026–	Fleury	0	(0)

International career^{‡}
2017–2018	France U16	10	(5)
2018–2019	France U17	4	(1)
2019	France U18	2	(2)
- * Club domestic league appearances and goals as of 12 May 2026 ‡ National team caps and goals as of 27 August 2023

Titouan Thomas (born 12 January 2002) is a French footballer who plays as a midfielder for Ligue 3 club Fleury.

== Club career ==
Born in Saint-Brieuc, Thomas began his career with local side AS Plélo, before spending time in the academies of La Châtelaudrinaise, Guingamp and Stade Briochin. He joined Olympique Lyonnais in 2017, signing a professional contract with the club in June 2019. During his time with Olympique Lyonnais, he was seen as one of the club's most promising young players. He was linked with a loan move away from the club in August 2021, having been brought on the first-team's pre-season tour by manager Peter Bosz.

However, on 30 June 2022, he joined Portuguese side Estoril on a free transfer. Having failed to break into the Estoril first team, he was loaned to Dutch Eerste Divisie side ADO Den Haag only a short while after signing.

On 16 August 2023, after failing to make his debut for Estoril, Thomas returned to France, signing a two-year contract, with an option for a further year, for Ligue 2 club Laval.

== International career ==
Thomas has represented France at youth international level.

== Career statistics ==
=== Club ===
As of match played 26 August 2023

Appearances and goals by club, season and competition
Club	Season	League			National cup		League cup		Total	
Club	Season	Division	Apps	Goals	Apps	Goals	Apps	Goals	Apps	Goals
Lyon B	2018–19	Championnat National 2	16	2	—		—		16	2
Lyon B	2019–20	Championnat National 2	10	0	—		—		10	0
Lyon B	2020–21	Championnat National 2	0	0	—		—		0	0
Lyon B	2021–22	Championnat National 2	24	1	—		—		24	1
Lyon B	Total		50	3	—		—		50	3
Estoril	2022–23	Primeira Liga	0	0	0	0	0	0	0	0
ADO Den Haag (loan)	2022–23	Eerste Divisie	24	2	3	0	—		27	2
Laval	2023–24	Ligue 2	1	0	0	0	0	0	1	0
Career total			75	5	3	0	0	0	78	5
