= Rémy Duterte =

French association footballer (born 1994)

Personal information
- Date of birth: 19 April 1994 (age 32)
- Place of birth: Saint-Martin-Boulogne, France
- Height: 1.76 m (5 ft 9 in)
- Position: Left-back

Senior career*
Years	Team	Apps	(Gls)
2012–2014	Valenciennes II	13	(1)
2014–2020	Boulogne II	21	(1)
2014–2021	Boulogne	136	(5)
2021	Laval II	8	(1)
2021–2023	Laval	33	(0)
2023–2025	Châteauroux	36	(1)
- * Club domestic league appearances and goals as of 26 May 2025

Rémy Duterte (born 19 April 1994) is a French professional footballer who plays as a left-back.

== Career ==
Duterte began his career with the reserves of Valenciennes in 2012. On 4 August 2014 he transferred to Boulogne. He transferred to Laval on 22 June 2021, after 7 seasons with Boulogne. He helped Laval win the 2021–22 Championnat National and achieved promotion into the Ligue 2 for the 2022-23 season. He made his professional debut with Laval in a 2–1 Ligue 2 loss to EA Guingamp on 6 August 2022.

On 17 July 2023, Châteauroux announced the signing of Duterte.

== Honours ==
Laval

- Championnat National: 2021–22
