= Pierrick Cros (footballer, born 1992) =

French footballer

Personal information
- Date of birth: 17 March 1992 (age 34)
- Place of birth: Montbrison, Loire, France
- Height: 1.85 m (6 ft 1 in)
- Position: Centre-back

Youth career
- 1998–1999: AS d'Aveizieux
- 1999–2006: Andrézieux
- 2006–2011: Saint-Étienne

Senior career*
Years	Team	Apps	(Gls)
2010–2012	Saint-Étienne	1	(0)
2012–2013	Uzès	30	(0)
2013–2017	Red Star	108	(3)
2017–2018	Platanias	8	(0)
2018	Andrézieux	7	(0)
2019–2020	Bastia-Borgo	25	(1)
2020–2023	Laval	44	(0)
2023–2024	Alès	10	(0)

International career
2010–2011	France U20	3	(0)
- * Club domestic league appearances and goals as of 27 April 2024

Pierrick Cros (born 17 March 1992) is a French professional footballer who plays as a centre-back. He formerly played for Ligue 1 side Saint-Étienne, and was a France youth international.

== Honours ==
Laval

- Championnat National: 2021–22
