= Simon Elisor =

French footballer (born 1999)

Personal information
- Full name: Simon Tom Elisor
- Date of birth: 22 July 1999 (age 27)
- Place of birth: Périgueux, France
- Height: 1.86 m (6 ft 1 in)
- Position: Forward

Team information
- Current team: Universitatea Craiova
- Number: 22

Youth career
- –2016: Istres
- 2016–2018: Martigues

Senior career*
Years	Team	Apps	(Gls)
2018–2019	Istres	19	(3)
2019–2020	Ajaccio B	17	(5)
2020–2022	Ajaccio	10	(1)
2021	→ Sète (loan)	8	(0)
2021–2022	→ Villefranche (loan)	34	(17)
2022–2023	Seraing	13	(1)
2023	→ Laval (loan)	21	(8)
2023–2025	Metz	23	(1)
2024	→ Troyes (loan)	18	(6)
2025–2026	Famalicão	48	(5)
2026–	Universitatea Craiova	8	(9)
- * Club domestic league appearances and goals as of 26 October 2026

Simon Tom Elisor (born 22 July 1999) is a French professional footballer who plays as a forward for Liga I club Universitatea Craiova.

== Career ==
=== Ajaccio ===
Trained as a youth with Istres, where he played in Championnat National 3, Elisor joined Ajaccio in the summer of 2019.

He made his senior debut for the Corsican club in a 1–0 Ligue 2 loss to Caen on 29 August 2020. Elisor scored his first professional goal in a 5-1 defeat to AJ Auxerre on 3 October 2020. In February 2021 he signed his first professional contract with Ajaccio, and moved on loan to Sète until the end of the 2020–21 season.

=== Villefranche (loan) ===
During the 2021-22 season, Elisor moved to Championnat National side Villefranche on loan. Elisor scored 17 goals in 34 matches, including 13 goals in his last 14 matches and a goal in the second leg of the Ligue 2 promotion/relegation playoffs which ended in a 3-1 defeat (6-1 aggregate) to Quevilly-Rouen. He also won player of the month for April which he scored 5 goals.

=== RFC Seraing ===
On 11 July 2022, Elisor signed a four-year contract with Seraing in Belgium. Elisor struggled to make an impact at Seraing as he only netted 1 goal in 13 Belgian Pro League matches and also missed a penalty on his home debut (in a 1-0 defeat to Kortrijk). Elisor scored his only goal for Seraing in a 2-1 loss to Union Saint-Gilloise on 30 October 2022.

=== Laval (loan) ===
On 5 January 2023, Elisor joined newly promoted Ligue 2 side Laval on loan. 5 days later, Elisor made his Laval debut in a 1-0 defeat to Saint-Étienne. Elisor netted his first goal for the club in a 2-1 home defeat to Paris FC. A week later, Elisor scored again in a 3-2 defeat to Niort. Elisor then added to his tally against Sochaux, Guingamp, a first brace for the club against Bastia, Saint-Etienne and Nimes as those goals proved very crucial as Laval secured their Ligue 2 status. Elisor finished his loan spell with 8 goals in 21 appearances for the club.

=== Metz ===
On 5 July 2023, Elisor signed with newly promoted Ligue 1 side Metz. Elisor made his debut for the club in a 1-0 win over Clermont on 27 August. Elisor netted his first goal for the club in a 3-1 win against Nantes on 12 November 2023. Elisor missed a penalty in a 2-0 defeat to Lille on 3 December 2023.

=== Troyes (loan) ===
On 11 January 2024, Elisor joined Troyes on loan. Elisor made his debut for Troyes in a 3-1 win against his former club Ajaccio on 13 January. Elisor netted his first goal for the club in a 2-1 win over Bordeaux on 3 February. Despite Elisor scoring 6 goals in 18 games, Troyes initially finished the season with relegation to Championnat National after finishing in 17th place, but after Ajaccio got administratively relegated to Championnat National due to financial issues, Troyes stayed in Ligue 2 for the following season. Elisor attracted transfer interest from English Championship side QPR after his brilliant loan spell with Troyes.

=== Universitatea Craiova ===
On 1 July 2026, Elisor signed a two-season contract with the Romanian defending champions, Universitatea Craiova, with the desire to play European football for the first time in his career. The transfer fee was reportedly worth €1.5 million.

== Personal life ==
His father Eric Elisor was also a professional footballer. His sister Salomé Elisor plays in French Division 1 and was a French youth international. Elisor is of Guadeloupean descent.

== Career statistics ==
As of match played on 5 November 2026

Appearances and goals by club, season and competition
Club	Season	League			National cup (Note: Includes Coupe de France, Taça de Portugal, Belgian Cup, Cupa României)		Europe		Other		Total	
Club	Season	Division	Apps	Goals	Apps	Goals	Apps	Goals	Apps	Goals	Apps	Goals
Ajaccio B	2019–20	Championnat National 3	16	4	—		—		—		16	4
Ajaccio B	2020–21	Championnat National 3	1	1	—		—		—		1	1
Ajaccio B	Total		17	5	—		—		—		17	5
Ajaccio	2020–21	Ligue 2	10	1	1	0	—		—		11	1
Sète (loan)	2020–21	Championnat National	8	0	—		—		—		8	0
Villefranche (loan)	2021–22	Championnat National	34	17	3	4	—		2 (Note: Appearances in Ligue 2 promotion/relegation play-offs)	1	39	22
Seraing	2022–23	Belgian Pro League	13	1	3	0	—		—		16	1
Laval (loan)	2022–23	Ligue 2	21	8	—		—		—		21	8
Metz	2023–24	Ligue 1	14	1	0	0	—		—		14	1
Metz	2024–25	Ligue 2	9	0	2	1	—		—		11	1
Metz	Total		23	1	2	1	—		—		25	2
Troyes (loan)	2023–24	Ligue 2	18	6	—		—		—		18	6
Famalicão	2024–25	Primeira Liga	15	4	—		—		—		15	4
Famalicão	2025–26	Primeira Liga	33	1	3	0	—		—		36	1
Famalicão	Total		48	5	3	0	—		—		51	5
Universitatea Craiova	2026–27	Liga I	8	9	2	1	6 (Note: Three appearances in UEFA Champions League, three appearances and one goal in UEFA Conference League)	1	1 (Note: Appearance in Supercupa României)	0	17	11
Career total			200	53	14	6	6	1	3	1	223	61

== Honours ==
Universitatea Craiova

- Supercupa României: 2026
