= Julien Maggiotti =

French footballer (born 1995)

Personal information
- Date of birth: 9 September 1995 (age 31)
- Place of birth: Bastia, France
- Height: 1.90 m (6 ft 3 in)
- Position: Midfielder

Team information
- Current team: Laval
- Number: 28

Youth career
- 2000–2017: Lucciana

Senior career*
Years	Team	Apps	(Gls)
2017–2020	Lucciana	53	(20)
2020–2021	Cholet	25	(4)
2021–2022	Laval	34	(6)
2022–2023	Charleroi	0	(0)
2022–2023	→ Laval (loan)	18	(7)
2023–2025	Bastia	37	(2)
2025–	Laval	21	(1)
- * Club domestic league appearances and goals as of 12 May 2026

Julien Maggiotti (born 9 September 1995) is a French professional footballer who plays as a midfielder for Ligue 2 club Laval.

== Career ==
A youth product of Lucciana since the age of 5, Maggiotti began his senior career with the club in 2017. An amateur at Lucciana, Maggiotti worked as an ironworker on the side and weighed 103 kg while playing. A chance meeting with the former professional footballer Pascal Camadini convinced him to lose weight, and he gained attention as one of the most talented players on his team.

He transferred to Cholet in the 2020–21 season.

On 17 June 2021, he moved to Laval in the Championnat National. He helped them win the 2021–22 Championnat National and earn promotion into the Ligue 2, and was named the club's player of the season by the fans.

On 21 June 2022, he transferred to the Belgium club Charleroi signing a 2+1 year deal, but immediately returned to Laval on loan for the 2022–23 Ligue 2 season.

On 26 July 2023, Ligue 2 side Bastia announced the signing of Maggiotti on a three-year deal, for approximately 500,000 euros.

On 24 June 2025, Maggiotti returned to Laval on a three-year deal.

== Statistics ==
Season	Club	Championship				National Cup(s)			Total		
Season	Club	Division	Mr.	B.	Pd	Mr.	B.	Pd	Mr.	B.	Pd
2020-2021	SO Cholet	National	25	4	0	-	-	-	25	4	0
Subtotal			25	4	0	0	0	0	25	4	0
2021-2022	Laval Stadium	National	34	6	11	5	2	0	39	8	11
2022-2023	Stade Lavallois (loan)	Ligue 2	18	7	4	-	-	-	18	7	4
Subtotal			52	13	15	5	2	0	57	15	15
2023-2024	SC Bastia	Ligue 2	12	0	1	0	0	0	12	0	1
2024-2025	SC Bastia	Ligue 2	18	2	0	4	0	0	22	2	0
Subtotal			30	2	1	4	0	0	34	2	1
Career total			107	19	16	7	1	0	114	20	16

== Honours ==
Laval

- Championnat National: 2021–22
