= Abdelkader Ferhaoui =

Algerian footballer (born 1965)

Kader Ferhaoui
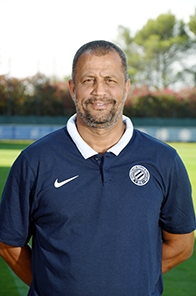
- Ferhaoui in 2021

Personal information
- Date of birth: 19 March 1965 (age 61)
- Place of birth: Oran, Algeria
- Height: 1.75 m (5 ft 9 in)
- Position: Midfielder

Youth career
- 1974–1981: GC Lunel
- 1981–1985: Montpellier

Senior career*
Years	Team	Apps	(Gls)
1985–1993	Montpellier	198	(33)
1993–1996	Cannes	94	(7)
1996–1998	Montpellier	51	(3)
1998–2000	Saint-Étienne	56	(4)
2000–2001	Red Star	17	(1)
Total		416	(48)

International career
1988	Algeria Olympic	1	(0)
1988–1994	Algeria	11	(1)

Managerial career
- 2010: Arles-Avignon
- 2013: Sporting Toulon
- 2014: US Le Pontet
- * Club domestic league appearances and goals

Abdelkader Ferhaoui, known as Kader Ferhaoui (Arabic: عبد القادر فرحاوي; born 19 March 1965) is an Algerian former professional footballer who played as a midfielder.

== Managerial career ==
On 16 September 2010 Ferhaoui was appointed as interim head coach of Ligue 1 side AC Arles-Avignon.

In June 2026, Ferhaoui addressed long-standing allegations regarding his absence from the 1990 African Cup of Nations, clarifying that he had never refused to represent Algeria. He explained that his sole withdrawal from a call-up was due to the Algerian Football Federation's failure to provide medical and career insurance for European-based professional players at the time, citing contemporary examples of players whose careers were derailed by injuries sustained on international duty without financial protection.

== Personal life ==
Ferhaoui is the father of the French footballer Ryan Ferhaoui. He holds Algerian and French nationalities.

== Career statistics ==
Appearances and goals by national team and year
National team	Year	Apps	Goals
Algeria Olympic	1988	1	0
Total		1	0

Appearances and goals by national team and year
National team	Year	Apps	Goals
Algeria	1988	4	1
Algeria	1989	3	0
Algeria	1991	3	0
Algeria	1994	1	0
Total		11	1

Scores and results list Algeria's goal tally first, score column indicates score after each Ferhaoui goal.

List of international goals scored by Kader Ferhaoui
No.	Date	Venue	Opponent	Score	Result	Competition	Ref.
1	19 March 1988	Stade Mohammed V, Casablanca, Morocco	Zaire	1-0	1-0	1988 African Cup of Nations	

== Honours ==
Montpellier

- Coupe Gambardella runner-up: 1984
- Coupe de France: 1989–90
- Coupe de la Ligue: 1991–92
- French Division 2: 1986–87
- Intertoto Cup runner-up: 1997

Saint-Étienne

- French Division 2: 1998–99

Algeria

- Africa Cup of Nations: third place 1988
- Afro-Asian Cup of Nations: 1991

Individual

- French Division 2 Footballer of the Year: 1999
