= Yasser Baldé =

Guinean association footballer (born 1993)

Personal information
- Date of birth: 12 January 1993 (age 33)
- Place of birth: Brignoles, France
- Height: 1.90 m (6 ft 3 in)
- Position: Centre-back

Youth career
- 2006–2007: Fréjus Saint-Raphaël
- 2007–2012: Auxerre

Senior career*
Years	Team	Apps	(Gls)
2012–2015	Auxerre II	6	(0)
2015–2018	Fréjus Saint-Raphaël	43	(1)
2018–2019	Marseille Endoume	22	(1)
2019–2020	Sedan	14	(1)
2020–2021	Cholet	26	(3)
2021	Laval II	2	(0)
2021–2024	Laval	68	(2)
2024	Ratchaburi	1	(0)
2024–2025	Raja CA	2	(0)
2025	Quevilly-Rouen	4	(0)

International career
2024–	Guinea	4	(0)
- * Club domestic league appearances and goals as of 12 December 2025

Yasser Baldé (born 12 January 1993) is a professional footballer who plays as a centre-back.

Born in France, he plays for the Guinea national team.

== Career ==
A youth product of the youth academy of Fréjus Saint-Raphaël and Auxerre, Baldé began his senior career with Auxerre's reserves in 2012 before returning to Fréjus Saint-Raphaël in 2015. He had a stint with Marseille Endoume in 2018.

In July 2019, Baldé moved to Sedan. He scored his first goal for the club in a 4–0 win over Schiltigheim on 2 November 2019.

On 28 June 2020, Baldé signed a contract with Cholet. He scored his first goal for the club in a 3–1 win over Sète 34.

On 20 May 2022, Baldé signed with Laval, becoming their first recruit in the 2021–22 season. He helped Laval win the 2021–22 Championnat National and achieved promotion into the Ligue 2 for the 2022–23 season. On 15 November 2022, he scored his first goal for the club in a 4–0 win over Caen.

On 7 July 2024, Baldé moved to Southeast Asia to joined with Thai League 1 club Ratchaburi. He make his debut for the club in a 3–2 lost to Nakhon Pathom United on 11 August.

On 19 September 2024, Baldé signed a one-year contract with Botola side Raja CA, with an option for one additional year.

== International career ==
In March 2024, Baldé was called up by Guinea national team for the inaugural 2024 FIFA Series. He make his debut on 21 March playing the entire match against Vanuatu in a 6–0 win. He then played his second match four days later against Bermuda in a 5–1 win.

He was then called up again in June for Guinea 2026 FIFA World Cup qualification match against Algeria and Mozambique where he featured in both match.

== Personal life ==
Baldé was born in France to a Guinean father and Moroccan mother. He holds French, Guinean and Moroccan nationalities. He is the half-brother of the Guinea international footballer Bobo Baldé.

== Honours ==
Laval

- Championnat National: 2021–22
