= François-Xavier Fumu Tamuzo =

French footballer (born 1995)

Personal information
- Date of birth: 3 April 1995 (age 31)
- Place of birth: Paris, France
- Height: 1.80 m (5 ft 11 in)
- Position: Striker

Youth career
- 2005–2006: Asnières
- 2006–2008: OSC Elancourt
- 2008–2014: Auxerre

Senior career*
Years	Team	Apps	(Gls)
2013–2019	Auxerre II	68	(27)
2014–2019	Auxerre	47	(3)
2018–2019	→ Quevilly-Rouen (loan)	33	(4)
2019–2020	Béziers	21	(1)
2020–2021	Marítimo	12	(0)
2021–2024	Laval	12	(0)
2022	Laval B	1	(0)
Total		194	(35)

International career
2014	France U20	2	(0)
- * Club domestic league appearances and goals as of 17:03, 8 May 2022 (UTC)

François-Xavier Fumu Tamuzo (born 3 April 1995) is a French former professional footballer who played as a striker. He is a former France youth international.

== Club career ==
Fumu Tamuzo is a youth exponent from AJ Auxerre. He made his Ligue 2 debut on 1 August 2014 against Le Havre AC in a 2–0 home win. He started in the first eleven, before being substituted after 76 minutes to Cheick Fantamady Diarra.

On 4 August 2020, Fumu Tamuzo signed with Marítimo. On 28 July 2021, he returned to France and signed a two-year contract with Laval.

== International career ==
Fumu Tamuzo was born in France to parents of Democratic Republic of the Congo descent. He is a former France youth international.

== Honours ==
Laval

- Championnat National: 2021–22
