= Kévin Perrot =

French footballer (born 1989)

Personal information
- Date of birth: 13 June 1989 (age 37)
- Place of birth: Laval, France
- Height: 1.70 m (5 ft 7 in)
- Position: Full-back

Team information
- Current team: Laval
- Number: 2

Senior career*
Years	Team	Apps	(Gls)
2008–2019	Laval B	89	(6)
2010–2019	Laval	197	(2)
2019–2021	Le Puy	9	(0)
2021–	Laval B	6	(2)
2021–	Laval	27	(1)
- * Club domestic league appearances and goals as of 27 June 2023

Kévin Perrot (born 13 June 1989) is a French professional footballer who plays as full-back for Ligue 2 club Laval.

== Career ==
A native of Laval, Perrot began his professional career in 2010 and made his debut in a 0–0 draw with Ajaccio on 24 September 2010.

On 18 June 2019, it was confirmed that Perrot had joined Le Puy. On 17 June 2021, he returned to Laval.

== Honours ==
Laval

- Championnat National: 2021–22
