= Bryan Goncalves =

French association footballer (born 1996)

Personal information
- Date of birth: 19 July 1996 (age 30)
- Place of birth: Maisons-Laffitte, France
- Height: 1.90 m (6 ft 3 in)
- Position: Centre-back

Youth career
- 2002–2008: Conflans FC
- 2008–2013: FC Herblay
- 2013–2015: Paris Saint-Germain

Senior career*
Years	Team	Apps	(Gls)
2015–2016	Paris Saint-Germain II	5	(1)
2016–2017	Conflans FC		
2017	Toulouse Rodéo	11	(3)
2017–2018	Saint-Leu		
2018	Marseille II	14	(2)
2018–2019	Houilles AC		
2019	Racing Besançon	1	(0)
2019–2021	Versailles	15	(1)
2021–2023	Laval	53	(2)
2023–2024	Beveren	28	(1)
2024–2026	Dender EH	55	(2)
- * Club domestic league appearances and goals as of 11 May 2026

Bryan Goncalves (born 19 July 1996) is a French professional footballer who plays as a centre-back.

== Career ==
Goncalves was a youth player for Conflans FC and FC Herblay where he played as a striker. He pretended he played as a centre-back in a trial with Paris Saint-Germain and ended up joining their reserves at the age of 18. He began his senior career with their reserves in 2015. He was released and moved to non-league football with Conflans FC before moving to Toulouse Rodéo in 2017. After a short stint with them, he again moved to non-league football with Saint-Leu before moving to the reserves of Marseille in 2018. He followed that up with successive stints at semi-pro clubs Houilles and Racing Besançon, before moving to the Championnat National 3 side Versailles and helping them achieve promotion in his debut season with them. On 17 June 2021, he transferred to Laval in the Championnat National. He again won promotion with Laval in his debut season, this time into the Ligue 2 as a starter.

On 31 July 2023, Goncalves signed a three-year contract with Beveren in Belgium.

== Personal life ==
Born in France, Goncalves also holds Portuguese nationality through his mother.

== Honours ==
Versailles

- Championnat National 3: 2019–20

Laval

- Championnat National: 2021–22
