= 2020–21 Championnat National =

Championnat National
- Season: 2020–21
- Dates: 21 August 2020 – 14 May 2021
- Champions: SC Bastia
- Promoted: SC Bastia; Quevilly-Rouen
- Relegated: SC Lyon
- Matches: 306
- Goals: 684 (2.24 per match)
- Top goalscorer: 21 goals Andrew Jung, Quevilly-Rouen
- Biggest home win: Orléans 6–1 Annecy; Round 8, 5 October 2020
- Biggest away win: Bourg-Péronnas 0–4 Red Star; Rearranged round 4, 10 November 2020
- Highest scoring: Cholet 5–4 Stade Briochin; Round 9, 9 October 2020
- Longest winning run: 5 (Quevilly-Rouen; SC Bastia; Villefranche)
- Longest unbeaten run: 11 (SC Bastia; Villefranche)
- Longest winless run: 13 (Bastia-Borgo)
- Longest losing run: 4 (Annecy; Créteil; Stade Briochin)

The 2020–21 Championnat National season was the 28th season since the establishment of the Championnat National, and the 22nd in its current format, which serves as the third division of the French football league system.

== Team changes ==
Team changes from the 2019–20 Championnat National were confirmed by the FFF on 17 July 2020.

=== To National ===
Promoted from National 2

- SC Bastia
- Stade Briochin
- Sète
- Annecy

Relegated from Ligue 2

- Orléans
- Le Mans

=== From National ===
Relegated to National 2

- Le Puy
- Toulon
- Gazélec Ajaccio
- Béziers

Promoted to Ligue 2

- Pau
- Dunkerque

=== Stadia and locations ===
Location of teams in 2020–21 National

Club	Location	Venue	Capacity
Annecy	Annecy	Parc des Sports (Note: Parc des Sports was unavailable until 31 October 2020 due to structural concerns. Annecy played their first two home games at Stade des Grangettes in Rumilly.)	15,660
Avranches	Avranches	Stade René Fenouillère	2,000
SC Bastia	Bastia	Stade Armand Cesari	16,048
Bastia-Borgo	Borgo	Stade Paul-Antoniotti	1,300
Boulogne	Boulogne-sur-Mer	Stade de la Libération (Note: Boulogne played their first home game at Stade de l'Epopée in Calais due to a new pitch being prepared at Stade de la Libération.)	15,204
Bourg-Péronnas	Bourg-en-Bresse	Stade Marcel-Verchère	11,400
Cholet	Cholet	Stade Pierre Blouen	9,000
Concarneau	Concarneau	Stade Guy Piriou	6,500
Créteil	Créteil	Stade Dominique Duvauchelle	12,150
Laval	Laval	Stade Francis Le Basser	18,607
Le Mans	Le Mans	MMArena	25,000
SC Lyon	Lyon	Stade de Balmont (Note: Sporting Club Lyon played their first home game at Stade Jacques Joly in Saint-Priest, due to work taking place on the pitch at Stade de Balmont.)	5,438
Orléans	Orléans	Stade de la Source	7,000
Quevilly-Rouen	Le Petit-Quevilly	Stade Robert Diochon	12,018
Red Star	Paris (Saint-Ouen)	Stade Bauer	10,000
Stade Briochin	Saint-Brieuc	Fred-Aubert Stadium	10,600
Sète	Sète	Stade Louis Michel	8,500
Villefranche	Villefranche-sur-Saône	Stade Armand-Chouffet	3,200

=== Number of teams by regions ===
Teams	Region	Team(s)
4	Auvergne-Rhône-Alpes	Annecy, Bourg-Péronnas, SC Lyon and Villefranche
3	Pays de la Loire	Cholet, Laval and Le Mans
2	Brittany	Concarneau and Stade Briochin
2	Corsica	Bastia and Bastia-Borgo
2	Île-de-France	Créteil and Red Star
2	Normandy	Avranches and Quevilly-Rouen
1	Centre-Val de Loire	Orléans
1	Hauts-de-France	Boulogne
1	Occitanie	Sète

== Impact of COVID-19 on the season ==
The start of the season was impacted by the ongoing COVID-19 situation. The game-week two match between Bourg-Péronnas and Annecy was postponed due to the visiting team having confirmed cases of COVID-19. Game-week three matches between Annecy and Villefranche, and Quevilly-Rouen and Bourg-Péronnas were both postponed due to COVID-19 cases at Annecy and Bourg-Péronnas, as was the match between Bourg-Péronnas and Red Star in game-week four, due to Bourg-Péronnas players still isolating. The game-week four match between Concarneau and Cholet was postponed an hour before kick-off due to positive tests for the Concarneau trainer and captain. There was a follow-on postponement for Concarneau's match with Annecy in game-week 5, Annecy's third postponement of the season.

The game-week four and five matches for Orléans, against Avranches and Stade Briochin, were both postponed when Orléans were given an eight-day suspension from official matches due to positive COVID-19 cases. The cases at Orléans also prompted the late postponement of the game-week 4 match between Bastia-Borgo and Boulogne, in accordance with local Corsican rules, due to Bastia-Borgo having played Orléans the previous Thursday.

Positive cases at Sète caused the postponement of their game-week 5 match at Quevilly-Rouen, and their game-week 6 match against Red Star, whilst a local decree in Haute-Corse caused the postponement of their game-week 7 tie at SC Bastia.

Laval's trip to SC Bastia in game-week 9 was postponed due to the squad isolating after a positive diagnosis. Further positive tests caused the cancellation of Laval's game-week 10 match against Boulogne. The match between SC Lyon and Cholet in the same round was postponed due to positive cases at Cholet.

Game-week 11 saw the postponements of Annecy v SC Lyon, Quevilly-Rouen v Stade Briochin and Villefranche v Sète due to Covid cases.

Four matches were rearranged for the catch-up week of 28 to 30 October; Quevilly-Rouen v Bourg-Péronnas, Sète v Red Star, Annecy v Villefranche, and SC Lyon v Cholet, but postponed for a second time due to Covid cases.

Game-week 12 ties between Cholet and Annecy, SC Lyon and Quevilly-Rouen, and Orléans and Boulogne were postponed. Game-week 13 ties between Boulogne and Avranches, and between Le Mans and Orléans were postponed.

All of the postponed matches were caught up by 15 December 2020.

In February 2021, Red Star had two matches postponed due to Covid cases.

In March 2021, the games between Laval and Bastia, and Concarneau and Boulogne, scheduled for 13 March, were both postponed due to Covid cases in the Laval and Boulogne squads. Boulogne's next scheduled match, against Laval, was also postponed. Positive cases at Créteil caused the postponement of their matches with Boulogne (27 March) and Le Mans (2 April). The rescheduled date for Créteil's match with Le Mans, 14 April, was also postponed, along with their match against Villefranche, scheduled for 17 April, as the outbreak continued.

In April, the game between Orléans and Le Mans, scheduled for 9 April, was postponed due to Covid cases in the Orléans squad. On 21 April, Orléans announced further postponements due to Covid cases: the game against Le Mans, which had been rearranged for 21 April, and the game against Villefranche, which was scheduled for 24 April. The game between Cholet and Bastia, scheduled for 23 April, was postponed on 22 April.

== League table ==
Due to the 2020–21 Championnat National 2 season being declared void, the normal relegation rules did not fully apply, as there was no balancing promotion from that division. However, the regulations of the Championnat National state that the team classified in last position is relegated without the possibility of repechage. On 13 July 2021 the FFF Comex (executive committee) confirmed the relegation of SC Lyon.

Pos	Team	Pld	W	D	L	GF	GA	GD	Pts	Promotion or Relegation
1	SC Bastia (C, P)	34	19	9	6	57	28	+29	66	Promotion to Ligue 2
2	Quevilly-Rouen (P)	34	16	10	8	48	31	+17	58	Promotion to Ligue 2
3	Villefranche	34	15	10	9	40	29	+11	55	Qualification to promotion play-offs
4	Le Mans	34	13	13	8	46	36	+10	52	
5	Concarneau	34	11	15	8	38	32	+6	48	
6	Orléans	34	12	11	11	49	41	+8	47	
7	Red Star	34	11	14	9	39	33	+6	47	
8	Cholet	34	11	10	13	36	48	−12	43	
9	Bourg-Péronnas	34	10	13	11	29	33	−4	43	
10	Stade Briochin	34	10	13	11	32	33	−1	43	
11	Sète	34	10	13	11	31	32	−1	43	
12	Laval	34	10	12	12	33	32	+1	42	
13	Avranches	34	11	8	15	36	42	−6	41	
14	Annecy	34	9	13	12	42	47	−5	40	
15	Boulogne	34	7	17	10	29	38	−9	38	
16	Bastia-Borgo	34	7	14	13	37	49	−12	35	
17	Créteil	34	8	11	15	29	48	−19	35	
18	SC Lyon (R)	34	5	16	13	33	52	−19	31	Relegation to 2021–22 Championnat National 2

Source: Soccerway
Rules for classification: 1) head-to-head results; 2) head-to-head goal difference; 3) goal difference; 4) goals scored; 5) fair play points
(C) Champions; (P) Promoted; (R) Relegated

== Promotion play-offs ==
A promotion play-off was held at the end of the season between the 18th-placed team of the 2020–21 Ligue 2 and the 3rd-placed team of the 2020–21 Championnat National. This was played over two legs on 19 and 22 May.

19 May 2021
19:00 CEST

Villefranche	3–1	Niort
Blanc 54'; Dauchy 84'; Garita 90+3'	Report	Bâ 45+2'

Stade Armand Chouffet, Villefranche-sur-Saône
Attendance: 0
Referee: Bartolomeu Varela Teles

22 May 2021
20:45 CEST

Niort	2–0	Villefranche
Lebeau 78'; Kemen 81'	Report

Stade René Gaillard, Niort
Attendance: 0
Referee: Nicolas Rainville

Niort won 3–3 on away goals

== Top scorers ==
As of games played on 15 May 2021.

Rank	Player	Club	Goals
1	(France) Andrew Jung	Quevilly-Rouen	21
2	(France) Wilson Isidor	Bastia-Borgo	15
3	(France) Ottman Dadoune	Quevilly-Rouen	13
3	(France) Gaëtan Perrin	Orléans	13
5	(France) Thomas Robinet	Laval	12
5	(France) Sébastian Da Silva	SC Bastia	12
5	(France) Billal Brahimi	Le Mans	12
5	(France) Antony Robic	SC Bastia	12
9	(France) Carnegy Antoine	Orléans	11
10	(Guadeloupe) Geoffray Durbant	Bastia-Borgo	10
10	(France) Romain Spano	Annecy	10
