= Amin Cherni =

Tunisian association footballer (born 2001)

Personal information
- Full name: Mohammed Amin Cherni
- Date of birth: 7 July 2001 (age 25)
- Place of birth: Paris, France
- Height: 1.81 m (5 ft 11 in)
- Position: Left-back

Team information
- Current team: Nantes (on loan from Göztepe)
- Number: 75

Youth career
- 2010–2020: Paris FC

Senior career*
Years	Team	Apps	(Gls)
2020–2021	Paris FC II	5	(0)
2021–2022	Paris 13 Atletico	20	(0)
2022–2023	Chambly	29	(3)
2023–2025	Laval	62	(6)
2025–	Göztepe	35	(0)
2026–	→ Nantes (loan)	0	(0)

International career^{‡}
2020–2021	Tunisia U20	8	(0)
2023–	Tunisia	2	(0)
- * Club domestic league appearances and goals as of 7 September 2026 ‡ National team caps and goals as of 15:00, 29 January 2025 (UTC)

Mohammed Amin Cherni (born 7 July 2001) is a professional footballer who plays as a left-back for Ligue 2 club Nantes on loan from Turkish club Göztepe. Born in France, he plays for the Tunisia national team.

== Club career ==
Cherni joined the youth academy of Paris FC at the age of 9, and spent a decade with the club eventually playing for the reserves in 2020. On 29 June 2021, he moved to the crosstown club Paris 13 Atletico in the Championnat National 2 where he began his senior career. The following season on 15 June 2022, he moved to Chambly under his former coach Fabien Valeri. On 30 June 2023, he moved to the Ligue 2 with Laval for 2 seasons, signing his first professional contract. He made his professional debut with Laval in a 1–0 Ligue 2 win over Angers on 5 August 2023.

On 23 July 2025, Cherni signed a three-year contract with Göztepe in Turkey.

== International career ==
Born in France, Cherni is of Tunisian descent. He was a youth international for Tunisia, having played for the Tunisia U20s at the 2021 U-20 Africa Cup of Nations. He was called up to the senior Tunisia national team for a set of 2026 FIFA World Cup qualification matches in November 2023.
