= Ansou Sow =

Malian footballer

Personal information
- Date of birth: 9 May 2000 (age 26)
- Place of birth: Dakar, Senegal
- Height: 1.77 m (5 ft 10 in)
- Position: Forward

Team information
- Current team: Châteaubriant
- Number: 11

Youth career
- 2015–2017: Ouakam
- 2017–2018: Jaraaf

Senior career*
| Years | Team | Apps | (Gls) |
| 2018–2021 | Lens II | 27 | (8) |
| 2021 | Lens | 1 | (0) |
| 2021–2022 | Chambly | 19 | (1) |
| 2022–2023 | Stade Briochin | 11 | (1) |
| 2022–2023 | Stade Briochin II | 5 | (1) |
| 2023 | Les Herbiers | 11 | (0) |
| 2023– | Châteaubriant | 33 | (3) |
- * Club domestic league appearances and goals as of 7 December 2024

Ansou Sow (born 9 May 2000) is a Senegalese professional footballer who plays as a forward for French Championnat National 1 club Châteaubriant.

== Career ==
On 4 July 2018, Sow signed a professional contract with RC Lens. He made his professional debut with Lens in a 4–1 Ligue 1 win over Lorient on 11 April 2001.

On 21 July 2022, Sow joined Stade Briochin.
