= Ryan Ferhaoui =

French footballer (born 1997)

Personal information
- Date of birth: 31 May 1997 (age 29)
- Place of birth: Montpellier, France
- Height: 1.87 m (6 ft 2 in)
- Position: Midfielder

Team information
- Current team: Créteil
- Number: 7

Youth career
- 2003–2010: Montpellier
- 2010–2012: AS Lattes
- 2012–2016: Ajaccio

Senior career*
Years	Team	Apps	(Gls)
2016–2021	Sète	96	(7)
2021–2024	Laval II	5	(0)
2021–2024	Laval	39	(1)
2025–	Créteil	17	(2)
- * Club domestic league appearances and goals as of 13 February 2026

Ryan Ferhaoui (born 31 May 1997) is a French professional footballer who plays as a midfielder for Championnat National 1 club Créteil.

== Career ==
Ferhaoui is a youth product of the academies of Montpellier, Lattes, and Ajaccio. He began his senior career with Sète, and transferred to Laval on 18 June 2021. He helped Laval win the 2021–22 Championnat National and achieved promotion into the Ligue 2 for the 2022–23 season. He made his professional debut with Laval in a 2–1 Ligue 2 loss to EA Guingamp on 6 August 2022.

== Personal life ==
Ferhaoui is the son of the retired Algerian international footballer Abdelkader Ferhaoui. He holds French and Algerian nationalities.

== Honours ==
Laval

- Championnat National: 2021–22
