= Marvin Baudry =

Congolese footballer (born 1990)

Personal information
- Date of birth: 26 January 1990 (age 36)
- Place of birth: Reims, France
- Height: 1.87 m (6 ft 1 1/2 in)
- Position: Defender

Senior career*
Years	Team	Apps	(Gls)
2008–2013	Amiens B	32	(0)
2011–2015	Amiens	61	(4)
2015–2020	Zulte Waregem	138	(3)
2021–2022	Laval B	2	(1)
2021–2024	Laval	85	(6)
2024–2026	Orléans	31	(0)

International career
2014–	Congo	36	(3)
- * Club domestic league appearances and goals as of 23 June 2026

Marvin Baudry (born 26 January 1990) is a professional footballer who plays as a defender. Born in France, he is a Republic of the Congo international.

== Club career ==
Born in Reims, Baudry has played for Amiens and its reserve side.

After not having played in the 2020–21 season, on 28 July 2021, Baudry signed a one-year contract with Laval.

On 1 July 2024, Baudry signed a two-year contract with Orléans.

== International career ==
Baudry made his international debut for the Congo in 2014. He was selected as part of the Congo's 26-man provisional squad for the 2015 Africa Cup of Nations in December 2014. Later, he was named to the final squad and became part of the successful performance of the national team at the tournament.

=== International goals ===
Scores and results list Congo's goal tally first.

No	Date	Venue	Opponent	Score	Result	Competition
1.	1 September 2015	Stade Municipal de Kintélé, Brazzaville, Congo	Ghana	1–0	2–3	Friendly
2.	12 November 2017	Stade Alphonse Massemba-Débat, Brazzaville, Congo	Uganda	1–0	1–1	2018 FIFA World Cup qualification

== Honours ==
Zulte Waregem

- Belgian Cup: 2016–17

Laval

- Championnat National: 2021–22
