= Edson Seidou =

French footballer (born 1991)

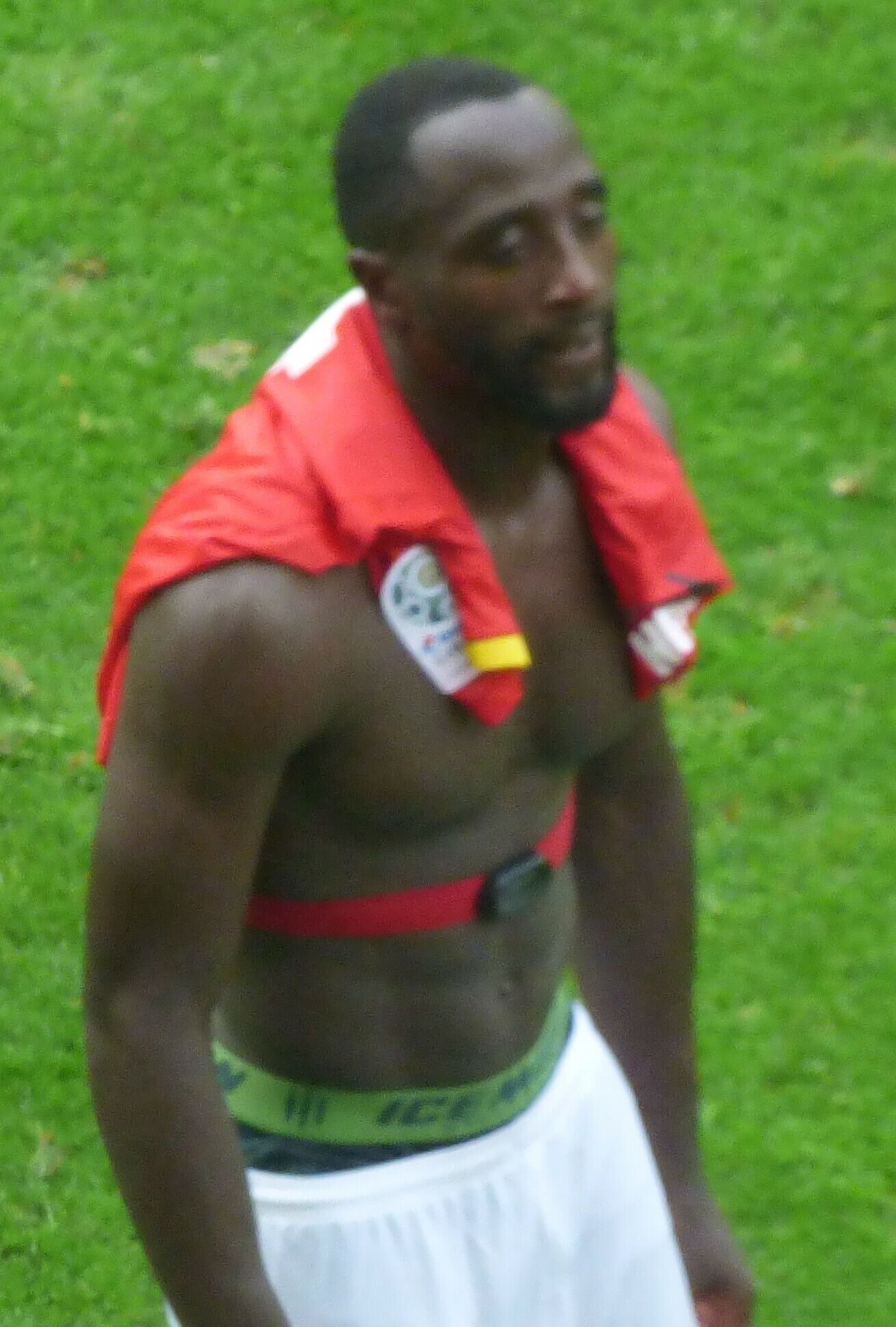
- Seidou in 2018

Personal information
- Date of birth: 7 October 1991 (age 35)
- Place of birth: Céret, France
- Height: 1.82 m (6 ft 0 in)
- Position: Left-back

Team information
- Current team: Le Puy
- Number: 3

Youth career
- Niort

Senior career*
Years	Team	Apps	(Gls)
2010–2011	Amiens	0	(0)
2011–2012	AC Amiens	22	(1)
2012–2013	Roye-Noyon	28	(4)
2013–2014	Colomiers	28	(2)
2014–2015	Red Star	8	(0)
2015–2016	Épinal	29	(3)
2016–2018	Orléans	50	(0)
2018–2020	Red Star	9	(0)
2020–2025	Laval	85	(5)
2021–2025	Laval B	10	(0)
2025–	Le Puy	16	(0)
- * Club domestic league appearances and goals as of 23 June 2026

Edson Seidou (born 7 October 1991) is a French professional footballer who plays as a defender for Ligue 3 club Le Puy.

== Career ==
Seidou was trained at Niort, and spent his early career at the third and fourth level of French football with Amiens SC, AC Amiens, Roye-Noyon, Colomiers, Red Star and Épinal. He made his breakthrough at the professional level in June 2016 when he joined Orléans in Ligue 2, signing an initial one-year contract, with the option of an additional year should Orléans remain in Ligue 2.

He made his Ligue 2 debut for Orléans in the first game of the 2016–17 Ligue 2 season, coming on as a late substitute in a 1–0 defeat against Le Havre.

After two season and 50 Ligue 2 appearances for Orléans, Seidou left upon expiration of his contract and, on 30 May 2018, signed with former club Red Star.

After a lack of playing time Seidou left Red Star in June 2020, and signed a two-year deal with Laval, reuniting with Olivier Frapolli who had coached him in Ligue 2 with Orléans.

== Personal life ==
Born in France, Seidou holds Ivorian and French nationalities. He is the cousin of Ivoirian footballer Fabrice Seidou.

== Honours ==
Laval

- Championnat National: 2021–22
