= Dembo Sylla =

Guinean footballer (born 2002)

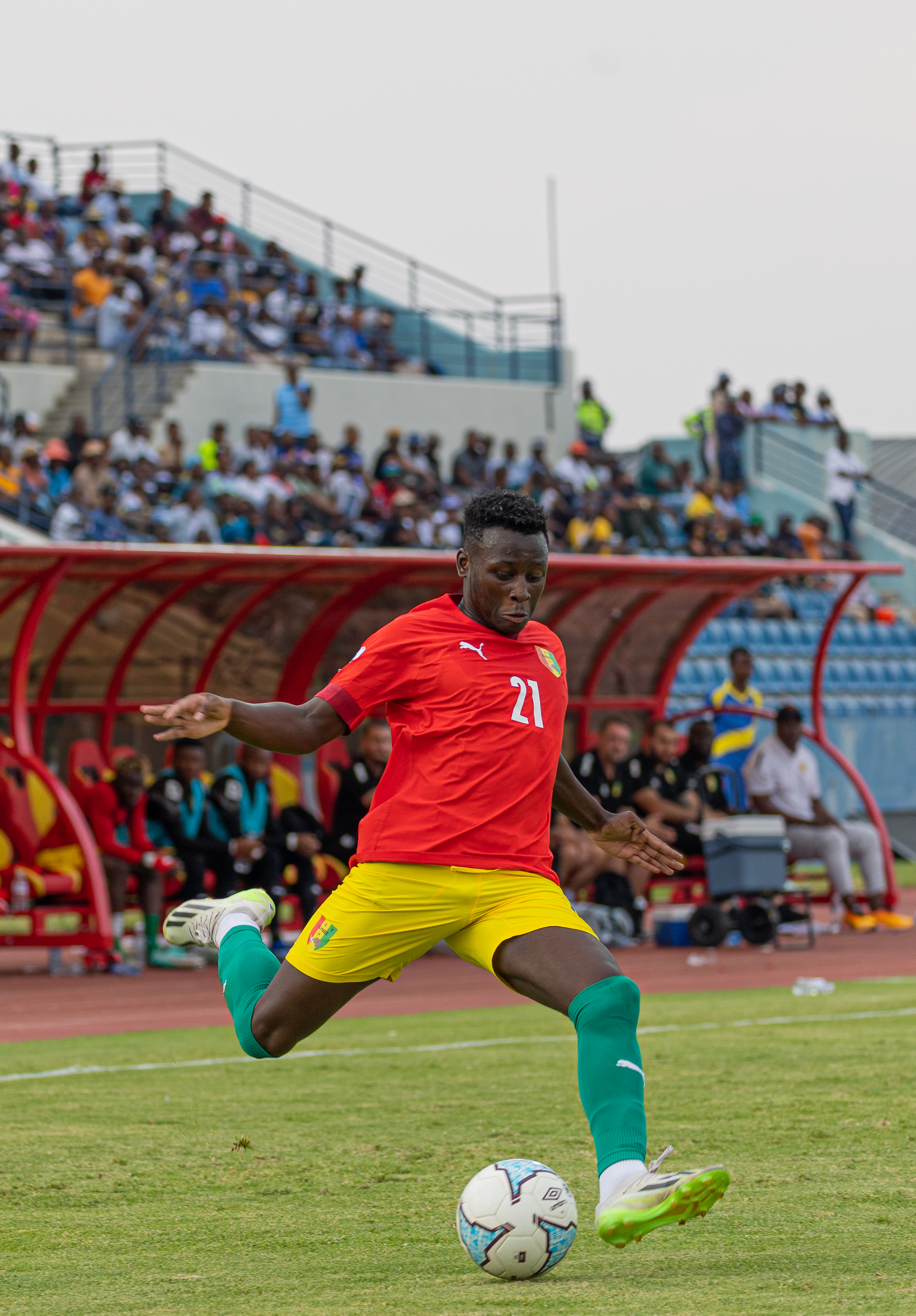
- Sylla with Guinea in 2023

Personal information
- Date of birth: 10 November 2002 (age 23)
- Place of birth: Laval, France
- Height: 1.75 m (5 ft 9 in)
- Position: Right-back

Team information
- Current team: Lorient
- Number: 20

Youth career
- 2011–2022: Laval

Senior career*
Years	Team	Apps	(Gls)
2019–2022	Laval II	24	(0)
2022–2023	Laval	30	(0)
2023–	Lorient	1	(0)
2023–	Lorient II	1	(0)
2024	→ Rodez (loan)	15	(0)
2024–2025	→ Dender EH (loan)	19	(0)
2025–2026	→ Red Star (loan)	31	(0)

International career^{‡}
2023–	Guinea	15	(0)
- * Club domestic league appearances and goals as of 11 May 2026 ‡ National team caps and goals as of 01:58, 3 April 2023 (UTC)

Dembo Sylla (born 10 November 2002) is a professional footballer who plays as a right-back for Ligue 1 club Lorient. Born in France, he plays for the Guinea national team.

== Career ==
A youth product of Laval since the U9s, Sylla began his career with their reserves in 2019 before signing his first professional contract with the club on 8 August 2022. He made his senior and professional debut with Laval as a late substitute in a 1–0 loss to Nîmes Olympique on 27 August 2022.

On 1 February 2024, Sylla was loaned to Rodez until the end of the season.

On 23 August 2024, Sylla moved on a new loan to Dender EH in Belgium, with an option to buy.

On 22 July 2025, Sylla joined Red Star on loan.

== Personal life ==
Diaby was born in Laval, to Guinean parents His sister Sounkamba Sylla is a French professional athlete.
