= Maxime Hautbois =

French footballer (born 1991)

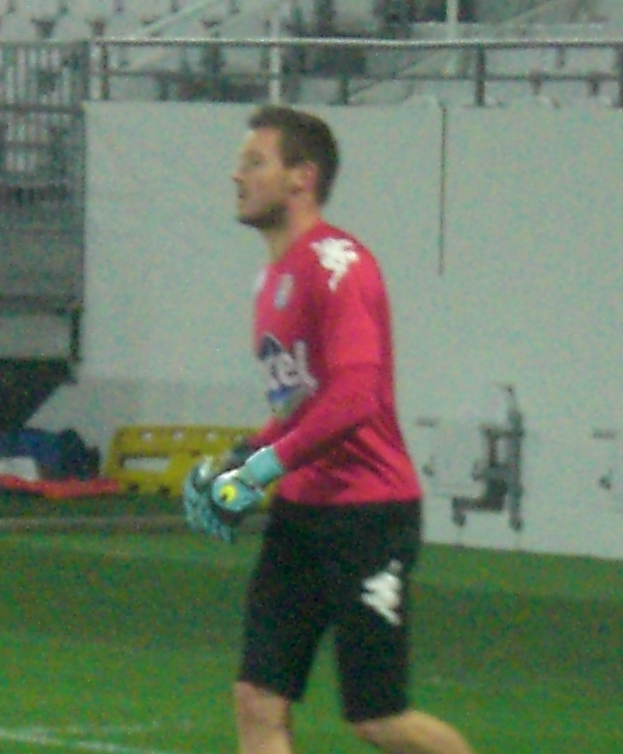
- Hautbois with Laval in 2015

Personal information
- Date of birth: 3 January 1991 (age 35)
- Place of birth: Laval, Mayenne, France
- Height: 1.81 m (5 ft 11 in)
- Position: Goalkeeper

Team information
- Current team: Laval
- Number: 1

Senior career*
Years	Team	Apps	(Gls)
2009–2017	Laval B	95	(0)
2011–2018	Laval	55	(1)
2018–2021	Lyon La Duchère (Note: In June 2020, AS Lyon-Duchère was renamed to SC Lyon. In June 2021, the club was renamed to Lyon La Duchère.)	81	(0)
2021–	Laval	13	(0)
2021–	Laval B	8	(0)
- * Club domestic league appearances and goals as of 11 May 2026

Maxime Hautbois (born 3 January 1991) is a French professional footballer who plays as a goalkeeper for Ligue 2 club Laval.

== Career ==
Born in Laval, Hautbois played eight seasons with his home-town club Laval, and in the 2017–18 season was voted 2nd best goalkeeper in the Championnat National. He left the club at the end of the same season, having refused to take a salary cut, and signed for Lyon-Duchère.

On 9 July 2021, Hautbois returned to Laval.

== Honours ==
Laval

- Championnat National: 2021–22
