= Antonin Bobichon =

French professional footballer (born 1995)

Personal information
- Date of birth: 14 September 1995 (age 31)
- Place of birth: Bagnols-sur-Cèze, France
- Height: 1.78 m (5 ft 10 in)
- Position: Right winger

Youth career
- –2014: Nîmes

Senior career*
Years	Team	Apps	(Gls)
2013–2019	Nîmes B	56	(13)
2014–2019	Nîmes	56	(8)
2016–2017	→ CA Bastia (loan)	28	(2)
2019–2023	Angers	41	(2)
2019–2022	Angers B	9	(1)
2022	→ Nancy (loan)	19	(1)
2023–2024	Laval	47	(9)
2024–2026	Pau	45	(8)
- * Club domestic league appearances and goals as of 11 May 2026

Antonin Bobichon (born 14 September 1995) is a French professional footballer who plays as a right winger.

== Club career ==
Bobichon is a youth exponent from Nîmes Olympique. He made his Ligue 2 debut on 17 October 2014 against Tours in a 2–1 away win, playing the entire game.

On 7 January 2022, he joined Nancy on loan until the end of the season.

On 6 January 2023, Bobichon signed a year-and-a-half-long contract with Ligue 2 club Laval.
