= Sam Sanna =

French footballer (born 1999)

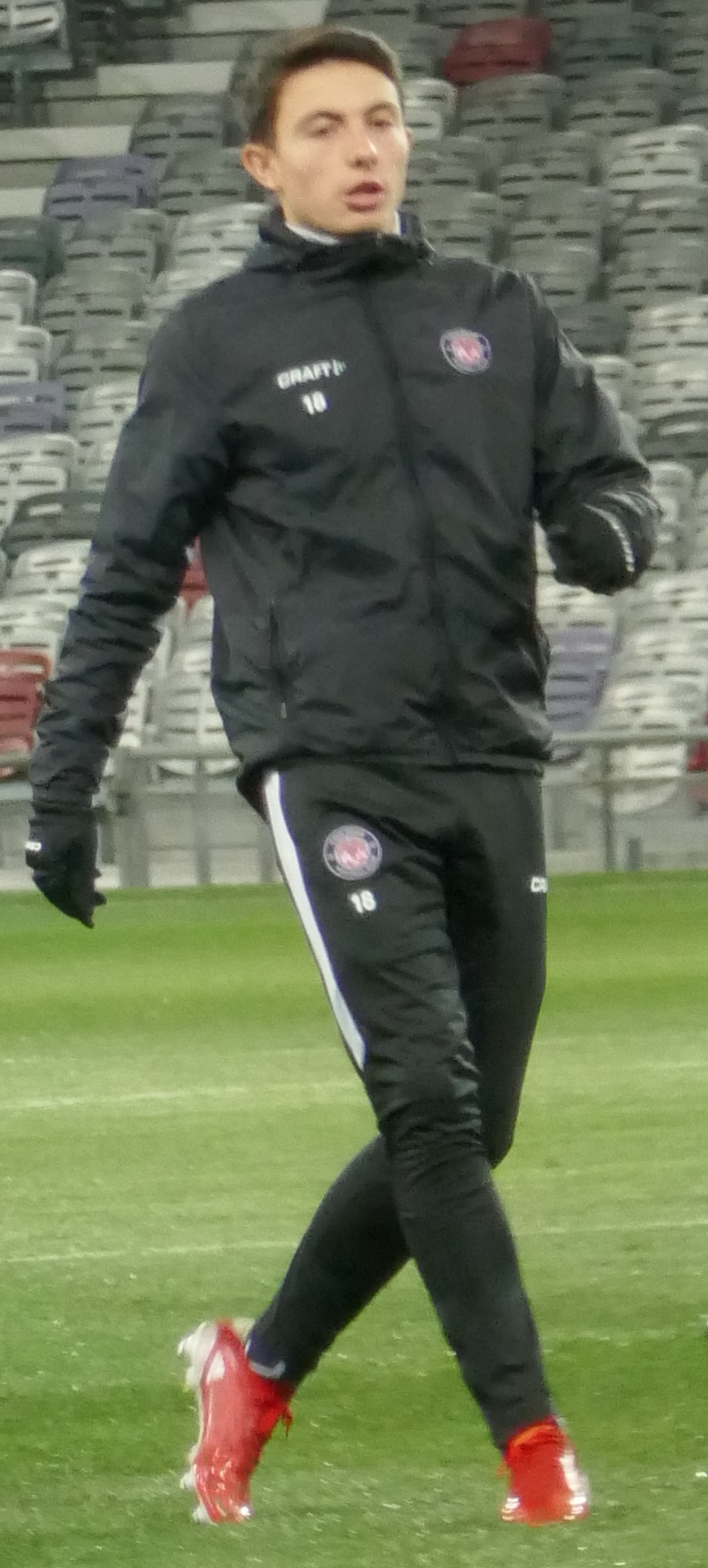
- Sanna warming up for Toulouse in 2022

Personal information
- Date of birth: 8 March 1999 (age 27)
- Place of birth: Lourdes, France
- Height: 1.70 m (5 ft 7 in)
- Position: Midfielder

Team information
- Current team: Laval
- Number: 6

Youth career
- 2014–2018: Toulouse

Senior career*
Years	Team	Apps	(Gls)
2018–2022	Toulouse II	37	(3)
2020–2023	Toulouse	35	(0)
2022–2023	→ Laval (loan)	21	(1)
2023–	Laval	99	(4)
- * Club domestic league appearances and goals as of 12 May 2026

Sam Sanna (born 8 March 1999) is a French professional footballer who plays as a midfielder for Ligue 2 club Laval.

== Career ==
A youth product of Toulouse, Sanna signed his first professional contract on 14 June 2020. He made his professional debut with Toulouse in a 5–3 Ligue 2 loss to Grenoble on 29 August 2020.

On 29 June 2022, Sanna moved on loan to Laval.

== Personal life ==
Born in Lourdes, France, Sanna is of Italian descent.

== Honours ==
Toulouse

- Ligue 2: 2021–22
