= 2019–20 Championnat National 2 =

Championnat National 2
- Season: 2019–20
- Dates: 10 August 2019 – 13 March 2020
- Promoted: SC Bastia; Saint-Brieuc; Sète; Annecy
- Relegated: 12 teams (see Season outcomes section)
- Top goalscorer: 15 goals Geoffray Durbant, Sedan
- Biggest home win: Andrézieux 5–0 Stade Bordelais; Group C, Round 18, 8 February 2020
- Biggest away win: Jura Sud 1–6 Louhans-Cuiseaux; Group D, Round 3, 24 August 2019; Montpellier (res) 0–5 Romorantin; Group C, Round 19, 15 February 2020
- Highest scoring: 10 goals Monaco (res) 4–6 Louhans-Cuiseaux; Group D, Round 1, 10 August 2019
- All statistics correct as of 11:24, 17 April 2020 (UTC).

The 2019–20 Championnat National 2 was the 22nd season of the fourth tier in the French football league system. The competition was contested by 64 clubs split geographically across 4 groups of 16 teams each. The teams included amateur clubs (although a few are semi-professional) and the reserve teams of professional clubs. The season was suspended indefinitely on 12 March 2020 due to the COVID-19 pandemic.

On 16 April 2020, the FFF announced the termination of the competition, with promotion and relegation decided by points earned per game played, subject to the normal verification process by the financial authority, the DNCG.

== Teams ==
On 16 July, the FFF ratified the constitution of the competition, and published the groups as follows:

- 46 clubs who were neither relegated or promoted from the 2018–19 Championnat National 2 groups.
- 3 teams relegated from 2018–19 Championnat National (Drancy, L'Entente SSG, Marignane Gignac).
- 12 teams promoted from 2018–19 Championnat National 3. (Angoulême, Angers (res), Bourges Foot, SC Bastia, Louhans-Cuiseaux, Mulhouse, Montpellier (res), Saint-Quentin, Rouen, Guingamp (res), Gobelins and Chamalières).
- 3 teams reprieved from relegation from the 2018–19 Championnat National 2 groups (Haguenau, Nîmes(res), Monaco (res)).

== League tables ==
=== Group A ===
| Pos | Team | Pld | W | D | L | GF | GA | GD | PPG | Promotion or relegation |
|---|---|---|---|---|---|---|---|---|---|---|
| 1 | SC Bastia (P) | 21 | 17 | 2 | 2 | 37 | 15 | +22 | 2.52 | Promotion to National |
| 2 | Sedan (P) | 21 | 14 | 6 | 1 | 27 | 4 | +23 | 2.29 | Promotion to National |
| 3 | Bobigny | 21 | 13 | 6 | 2 | 35 | 12 | +23 | 2.14 | |
| 4 | Reims (res) | 21 | 10 | 6 | 5 | 39 | 30 | +9 | 1.71 | |
| 5 | Sainte-Geneviève | 21 | 9 | 7 | 5 | 30 | 25 | +5 | 1.62 | |
| 6 | Épinal | 21 | 8 | 6 | 7 | 22 | 15 | +7 | 1.43 | |
| 7 | Lens (res) | 21 | 7 | 7 | 7 | 26 | 27 | −1 | 1.33 | |
| 8 | Saint-Maur | 21 | 6 | 6 | 9 | 22 | 23 | −1 | 1.14 | |
| 9 | Haguenau | 21 | 6 | 5 | 10 | 21 | 29 | −8 | 1.10 | |
| 10 | Saint-Quentin | 21 | 6 | 5 | 10 | 23 | 27 | −4 | 1.10 | |
| 11 | Schiltigheim | 21 | 6 | 4 | 11 | 26 | 36 | −10 | 1.05 | |
| 12 | Mulhouse (Note: On 16 June 2020, the DNCG committee of the FFF announced that Mulhouse were administratively relegated to Championnat National 3 due to financial issues. The club has the right of appeal.) (R) | 21 | 3 | 11 | 7 | 17 | 27 | −10 | 0.95 | Relegation to National 3 |
| 13 | Belfort | 21 | 5 | 4 | 12 | 24 | 34 | −10 | 0.90 | |
| 14 | Lille (res) (R) | 21 | 3 | 9 | 9 | 12 | 21 | −9 | 0.86 | Relegation to National 3 |
| 15 | Drancy (R) | 21 | 3 | 8 | 10 | 16 | 28 | −12 | 0.81 | Relegation to National 3 |
| 16 | Croix (R) | 21 | 4 | 4 | 13 | 17 | 41 | −24 | 0.76 | Relegation to National 3 |

Source: foot-national.com
Rules for classification: 1) points; 2) head-to-head results; 3) head-to-head goal difference; 4) goal difference; 5) number of goals scored; 6) fair play points; 7) draw
(P) Promoted; (R) Relegated

=== Group B ===
| Pos | Team | Pld | W | D | L | GF | GA | GD | PPG | Promotion or relegation |
|---|---|---|---|---|---|---|---|---|---|---|
| 1 | Saint-Brieuc (P) | 21 | 14 | 4 | 3 | 38 | 22 | +16 | 2.19 | Promotion to National |
| 2 | Chartres | 21 | 13 | 5 | 3 | 42 | 19 | +23 | 2.10 | |
| 3 | Rouen | 20 | 11 | 6 | 3 | 23 | 15 | +8 | 1.95 | |
| 4 | Granville | 21 | 11 | 5 | 5 | 22 | 21 | +1 | 1.81 | |
| 5 | Vannes | 21 | 9 | 8 | 4 | 35 | 24 | +11 | 1.67 | |
| 6 | Gobelins | 21 | 9 | 3 | 9 | 32 | 29 | +3 | 1.43 | |
| 7 | Lorient (res) | 21 | 8 | 6 | 7 | 19 | 19 | 0 | 1.43 | |
| 8 | Fleury | 21 | 8 | 5 | 8 | 24 | 23 | +1 | 1.38 | |
| 9 | Saint-Malo | 20 | 7 | 7 | 6 | 23 | 22 | +1 | 1.40 | |
| 10 | Angers (res) | 21 | 6 | 9 | 6 | 21 | 19 | +2 | 1.29 | |
| 11 | Guingamp (res) | 21 | 7 | 2 | 12 | 30 | 34 | −4 | 1.10 | |
| 12 | L'Entente SSG | 21 | 5 | 8 | 8 | 20 | 24 | −4 | 1.10 | |
| 13 | Poissy | 21 | 4 | 10 | 7 | 28 | 32 | −4 | 1.05 | |
| 14 | Vitré (R) | 21 | 2 | 12 | 7 | 19 | 26 | −7 | 0.86 | Relegation to National 3 |
| 15 | Oissel (R) | 21 | 2 | 7 | 12 | 18 | 38 | −20 | 0.62 | Relegation to National 3 |
| 16 | Mantes (Note: On 21 January the DNCG (financial management committee) deducted a penalty point from Mantes for breach of financial regulations.) (R) | 21 | 1 | 3 | 17 | 7 | 34 | −27 | 0.24 | Relegation to National 3 |

Source: foot-national.com
Rules for classification: 1) points; 2) head-to-head results; 3) head-to-head goal difference; 4) goal difference; 5) number of goals scored; 6) fair play points; 7) draw
(P) Promoted; (R) Relegated

=== Group C ===
| Pos | Team | Pld | W | D | L | GF | GA | GD | PPG | Promotion or relegation |
|---|---|---|---|---|---|---|---|---|---|---|
| 1 | Sète (P) | 21 | 15 | 4 | 2 | 33 | 15 | +18 | 2.33 | Promotion to National |
| 2 | Blois | 20 | 12 | 2 | 6 | 24 | 20 | +4 | 1.90 | |
| 3 | Bergerac | 21 | 10 | 6 | 5 | 23 | 16 | +7 | 1.71 | |
| 4 | Les Herbiers (Note: On 9 November 2019, the match between Montpellier (res) and Les Herbiers was abandoned after 78 minutes, due to electrical failure at the ground, with Les Herbiers leading 1–0. The match was initially ordered to be replayed. Les Herbiers appealed the decision, and on 5 February 2020 the Commission Supérieure d'Appel of the FFF awarded the match to Les Herbiers as a 3–0 victory, and deducted Montpeliier (res) a penalty point. Montpellier may still appeal to the CNOSF.) | 20 | 11 | 2 | 7 | 29 | 19 | +10 | 1.75 | |
| 5 | Colomiers | 20 | 7 | 10 | 3 | 28 | 19 | +9 | 1.55 | |
| 6 | Saint-Pryvé | 21 | 8 | 7 | 6 | 25 | 26 | −1 | 1.48 | |
| 7 | Bourges Foot | 21 | 9 | 4 | 8 | 25 | 21 | +4 | 1.48 | |
| 8 | Nantes (res) | 21 | 6 | 10 | 5 | 23 | 19 | +4 | 1.33 | |
| 9 | Angoulême | 20 | 6 | 9 | 5 | 29 | 24 | +5 | 1.35 | |
| 10 | Romorantin | 21 | 6 | 7 | 8 | 25 | 20 | +5 | 1.19 | |
| 11 | Andrézieux | 21 | 5 | 8 | 8 | 26 | 25 | +1 | 1.10 | |
| 12 | Trélissac | 21 | 5 | 7 | 9 | 18 | 22 | −4 | 1.05 | |
| 13 | Chamalières | 20 | 5 | 6 | 9 | 19 | 27 | −8 | 1.05 | |
| 14 | Montpellier (res) (R) | 21 | 5 | 7 | 9 | 25 | 38 | −13 | 1.00 | Relegation to National 3 |
| 15 | Saint-Étienne (res) (R) | 21 | 4 | 6 | 11 | 19 | 32 | −13 | 0.86 | Relegation to National 3 |
| 16 | Stade Bordelais (R) | 20 | 2 | 3 | 15 | 16 | 44 | −28 | 0.45 | Relegation to National 3 |

Source: foot-national.com
Rules for classification: 1) points; 2) head-to-head results; 3) head-to-head goal difference; 4) goal difference; 5) number of goals scored; 6) fair play points; 7) draw
(P) Promoted; (R) Relegated

=== Group D ===
| Pos | Team | Pld | W | D | L | GF | GA | GD | PPG | Promotion or relegation |
|---|---|---|---|---|---|---|---|---|---|---|
| 1 | Annecy (P) | 21 | 12 | 6 | 3 | 30 | 16 | +14 | 2.00 | Promotion to National |
| 2 | Grasse | 21 | 11 | 7 | 3 | 28 | 17 | +11 | 1.90 | |
| 3 | MDA Foot | 21 | 11 | 6 | 4 | 32 | 19 | +13 | 1.86 | |
| 4 | Moulins Yzeure | 21 | 11 | 6 | 4 | 30 | 21 | +9 | 1.86 | |
| 5 | Martigues | 21 | 10 | 7 | 4 | 27 | 20 | +7 | 1.76 | |
| 6 | Louhans-Cuiseaux | 21 | 10 | 6 | 5 | 42 | 24 | +18 | 1.71 | |
| 7 | Fréjus Saint-Raphaël | 21 | 6 | 9 | 6 | 21 | 22 | −1 | 1.29 | |
| 8 | Lyon (res) | 21 | 7 | 4 | 10 | 28 | 31 | −3 | 1.19 | |
| 9 | Hyères | 21 | 6 | 7 | 8 | 13 | 21 | −8 | 1.19 | |
| 10 | Olympic Marseille (res) | 21 | 7 | 3 | 11 | 27 | 38 | −11 | 1.14 | |
| 11 | Jura Sud | 21 | 6 | 5 | 10 | 24 | 37 | −13 | 1.10 | |
| 12 | Marignane Gignac | 21 | 5 | 7 | 9 | 19 | 23 | −4 | 1.05 | |
| 13 | Monaco (res) | 21 | 6 | 4 | 11 | 26 | 34 | −8 | 1.05 | |
| 14 | Saint-Priest | 21 | 4 | 9 | 8 | 24 | 27 | −3 | 1.00 | |
| 15 | Endoume Marseille (R) | 21 | 4 | 7 | 10 | 23 | 33 | −10 | 0.90 | Relegation to National 3 |
| 16 | Nîmes (res) (Note: Nîmes (res) were penalised for fielding a suspended player in the match at Louhans-Cuiseaux on 21 December 2019. The original scoreline was 1–2. The revised scoreline is 3–0. Nîmes (res) were also deducted a penalty point.) (R) | 21 | 3 | 5 | 13 | 19 | 30 | −11 | 0.62 | Relegation to National 3 |

Source: foot-national.com
Rules for classification: 1) points; 2) head-to-head results; 3) head-to-head goal difference; 4) goal difference; 5) number of goals scored; 6) fair play points; 7) draw
(P) Promoted; (R) Relegated

== Top scorers ==
As of termination of the season.

| Rank | Player | Club | Goals |
|---|---|---|---|
| 1 | (Guadeloupe) Geoffray Durbant | Sedan | 15 |
| 2 | (France) Pythocles Bazolo | Bobigny | 14 |
| 3 | (France) Kévin Farade | Bobigny | 13 |
| 3 | (France) Nigel Solvet | Haguenau | 13 |
| 3 | (France) Jordan Popineau | Blois | 13 |
| 6 | (France) Marvyn Belliard | Sainte-Geneviève | 12 |
| 7 | (France) Kévin Cardinali | Colomiers | 11 |
| 7 | (France) Samy Alouache | Moulins-Yzeure | 11 |
| 9 | (Senegal) Daouda Gueye | Bourges Foot | 10 |
| 10 | (Central African Republic) Louis Mafouta | Grasse | 9 |
| 10 | (France) Sébastien Persico | Chartres | 9 |
| 10 | (Senegal) Mamadou Niang | Saint-Quentin | 9 |

== Season outcomes ==
=== Promotion ===
SC Bastia, Saint-Brieuc, Sète and Annecy were champions of each group, and are promoted to 2020–21 Championnat National, subject to the usual ratification by the FFF and DNCG.

=== Relegation ===
Croix, Drancy, Lille (res), Mantes, Oissel, Vitré, Montpellier (res), Stade Bordelais, Saint-Étienne (res), Saint-Priest, Endoume Marseille and Nîmes (res) finished in the relegation places, and are relegated to 2020–21 Championnat National 3, subject to any reprieves detailed in the next section.

On 16 June 2020 Mulhouse were administrative relegated by the DNCG committee of the FFF. The relegation was confirmed on appeal.

=== Reprieves ===
Any reprieves required due to administrative relegations, mergers or clubs folding are usually decided by taking, in order, the 14th placed clubs ranked by order of their record against clubs finishing 9th to 13th position in their group, followed by the 15th placed clubs ranked by order of their record against clubs finishing in 10th to 14th position in their group. Due to the season not being completed, this ranking used points per game rather than points earned.

Saint-Priest were reprieved due to the administrative relegation of Mulhouse, subject to that club appealing the decision.

==== Best 14th placed team ====
As of 20 April 2020.

| Pos | Team | PPG | GD | |
|---|---|---|---|---|
| 1 | Saint-Priest | 1.83 | 6 | Reprieved |
| 2 | Lille (res) | 1.5 | 1 | |
| 3 | Vitré | 1.14 | 0 | |
| 4 | Montpellier (res) | 1.12 | -5 | |

==== Best 15th placed team ====
As of 20 April 2020.

| Pos | Team | PPG | GD |
|---|---|---|---|
| 1 | Saint-Étienne (res) | 1.6 | 0 |
| 2 | Drancy | 1.43 | 2 |
| 3 | Marseille Endoume | 1.16 | 0 |
| 4 | Oissel | 0.33 | -14 |
