= Geoffray Durbant =

Guadeloupean footballer (born 1992)

Personal information
- Full name: Geoffray Steven Durbant
- Date of birth: 19 May 1992 (age 34)
- Place of birth: Bondy, France
- Height: 1.83 m (6 ft 0 in)
- Position: Forward

Team information
- Current team: Chambly
- Number: 11

Youth career
- 1996–2005: Villemomble Sports
- 2005–2007: AC Bobigny
- 2007–2009: Beauvais
- 2009–2011: Red Star

Senior career*
Years	Team	Apps	(Gls)
2011–2014	Red Star	31	(2)
2014–2015	Roye-Noyon	25	(7)
2015	Vitré	3	(0)
2015–2016	UJA Maccabi Paris	19	(9)
2016–2017	Oissel	24	(7)
2017–2018	Dieppe	23	(10)
2018–2019	Lusitanos Saint-Maur	26	(13)
2019–2020	Sedan	21	(15)
2020–2021	Bastia-Borgo	32	(10)
2021–2023	Laval	66	(23)
2023–2024	Châteauroux	27	(11)
2024	Fujairah	2	(0)
2025	Sochaux	15	(3)
2025–2026	FC 93	11	(0)
2026–	Chambly	9	(0)

International career
2019–2023	Guadeloupe	3	(2)
- * Club domestic league appearances and goals as of 12 April 2026

Geoffray Steven Durbant (born 19 May 1992) is a professional footballer who plays as a forward for Championnat National 1 club Chambly. Born in metropolitan France, he plays for the Guadeloupe national team.

== Club career ==
Durbant is a youth academy graduate of Red Star. He made his senior debut for the club on 18 May 2012 as a 69th minute substitute for Cédric Sabin in a 2–0 win against Vannes.

Durbant scored 15 goals for Sedan during the 2019–20 Championnat National 2 season and was the league top scorer before the competition was terminated due to COVID-19 pandemic in April 2020. In June 2020, he joined Bastia-Borgo.

On 7 June 2021, Laval announced the signing of Durbant on a two-year deal. He helped the club achieve promotion in his first season, winning the Championnat National. On 21 July 2023, he joined Châteauroux.

On 16 January 2025, Durban signed with Sochaux in Championnat National until the end of the season, with an option to extend for the 2025–26 season. In August 2025, he joined FC 93 BBG.

== International career ==
Born in France, Durbant represents Guadeloupe at international level. He received his maiden call-up to the Guadeloupe national team in November 2019. He made his debut on 18 November by scoring two goals in a 10–0 CONCACAF Nations League win against the Turks and Caicos Islands.

== Personal life ==
Durbant is of Guadeloupean and Vietnamese descent. His brother Dylan is also a footballer and plays as a goalkeeper. Their father is from Capesterre-Belle-Eau.

In 2022, Durbant married Olympic silver medalist rugby player Anne-Cécile Ciofani.

== Career statistics ==
=== International ===
As of match played 26 March 2023

Appearances and goals by national team and year
National team	Year	Apps	Goals
Guadeloupe	2019	1	2
Guadeloupe	2023	2	0
Total		3	2

Scores and results list Guadeloupe's goal tally first, score column indicates score after each Durbant goal.

List of international goals scored by Geoffray Durbant
No.	Date	Venue	Opponent	Score	Result	Competition
1	18 November 2019	Stade René Serge Nabajoth, Les Abymes, Guadeloupe	Turks and Caicos Islands	5–0	10–0	2019–20 CONCACAF Nations League
2	18 November 2019	Stade René Serge Nabajoth, Les Abymes, Guadeloupe	Turks and Caicos Islands	7–0	10–0	2019–20 CONCACAF Nations League

== Honours ==
Laval

- Championnat National: 2021–22

Individual

- Championnat National Player of the Month: September 2021, August 2023
