= Stade Francis Le Basser =

Football stadium

Coordinates: 48°04′57″N 0°45′17″W

Stade Francis-Le Basser
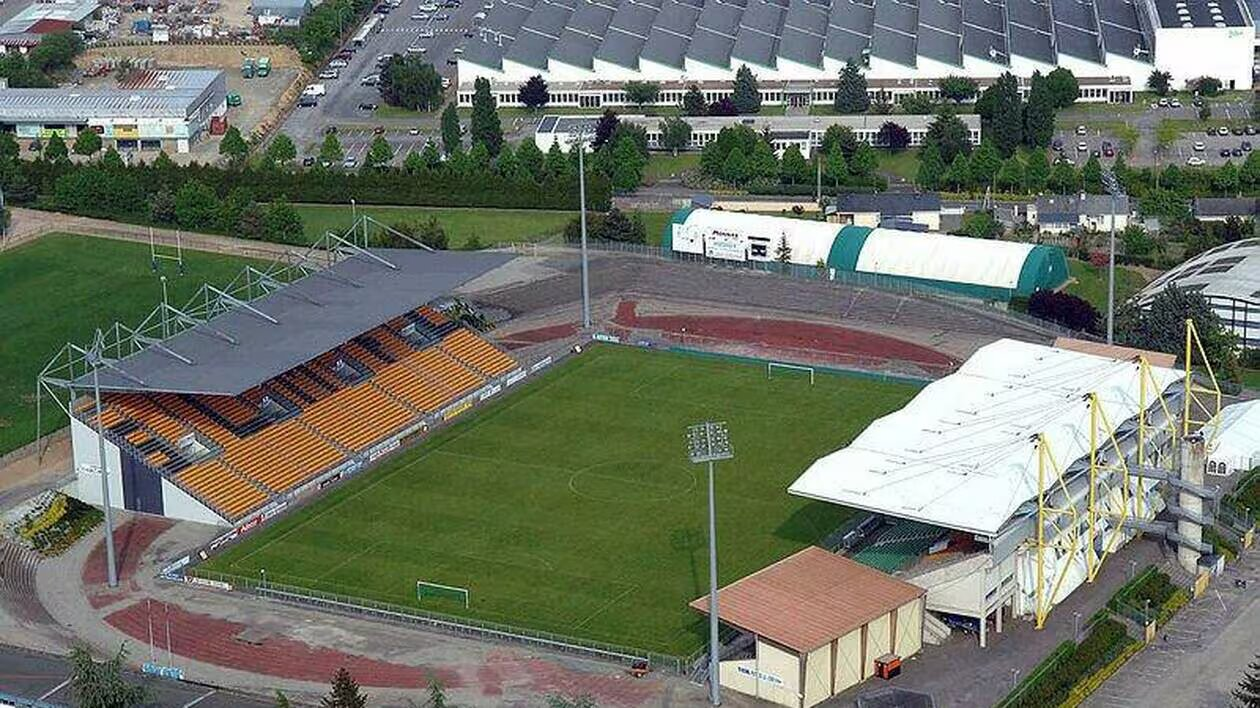
- Interactive map of Stade Francis-Le Basser
- Former names: Parc municipal (1969–1971)
- Owner: Laval Agglomeration
- Capacity: 11,107 (10,107 seated)
- Surface: grass
- Record attendance: 20,859 (24 August 1979 vs AS Saint-Etienne)

Construction
- Built: 1968-1969
- Opened: 10 June 1969
- Renovated: 1989, 2001, 2012, 2017, 2021
- Expanded: 1978
- Architect: Jean Saint-Arroman

Tenant
- Stade Lavallois (1969–present)

Stade Francis Le Basser is a multi-use stadium in Laval, France. It is currently used mostly for football matches and is the home stadium of Stade Lavallois. The stadium is able to hold 11,107 people.
