= SO Cholet =

French football club

Cholet
- Full name: Stade Olympique Choletais
- Founded: 1913; 113 years ago
- Ground: Stade Pierre Blouen & Stade Omnisports, Cholet
- Capacity: 9,000
- Chairman: Benjamin Erisoglu
- Manager: Vincent Rautureau
- League: Régional 3
- 2023–24: Championnat National, 18th of 18 (administratively relegated)
- Website: www.socholet.fr
Home colours	Away colours	Third colours

Stade Olympique Choletais is a French association football team founded in 1913. The club is based in Cholet, Pays de la Loire and play at Omnisports Stadium, which has a capacity of 9,000 spectators. They currently play in the Régional 3, the eighth tier of French football.

== History ==
On 10 July 2024, it was announced that Cholet would be administratively relegated to the Régional 3, the eighth tier of the French football league system.
