= 2021–22 Championnat National =

Championnat National
- Season: 2021–22
- Dates: 6 August 2021 – 13 May 2022
- Champions: Laval
- Promoted: Laval; Annecy
- Relegated: Sète; Chambly; Boulogne; Créteil
- Matches: 306
- Goals: 756 (2.47 per match)
- Top goalscorer: 21 Pape Meïssa Ba, Red Star
- Biggest home win: Annecy 6–0 Red Star (Game-week 6, 10 September 2021)
- Biggest away win: Avranches 0–6 Red Star (Game-week 10, 8 October 2021)
- Highest scoring: 8 goals Créteil 4–4 Cholet (Game-week 33, 5 May 2022)
- Longest winning run: 7 (Laval)
- Longest unbeaten run: 11 (Bourg-Péronnas; Concarneau)
- Longest winless run: 19 (Boulogne)
- Longest losing run: 5 (Boulogne)
- All statistics correct as of 10:09, 14 July 2022 (UTC).

The 2021–22 Championnat National season was the 29th season since the establishment of the Championnat National, and the 23rd in its current format, which serves as the third division of the French football league system.

== Team changes ==
Team changes from the 2020–21 Championnat National.

=== To National ===
Promoted from 2020–21 Championnat National 2

- None. Season not completed due to COVID-19 pandemic.

Promoted from 2019–20 Championnat National 2

- Sedan (Note: Sedan were awarded a place in Championnat National due to finishing as second best team in the 2019–20 Championnat National 2 season, according to competition rules when a gap needs to be filled.)

Relegated from Ligue 2

- Châteauroux
- Chambly

=== From National ===
Relegated to National 2

- SC Lyon

Promoted to Ligue 2

- Bastia
- Quevilly-Rouen

=== Stadia and locations ===
Location of teams in 2021–22 National

Club	Location	Venue	Capacity
Annecy	Annecy	Parc des Sports	15,660
Avranches	Avranches	Stade René Fenouillère	2,000
Bastia-Borgo	Borgo	Stade Paul-Antoniotti	1,300
Boulogne	Boulogne-sur-Mer	Stade de la Libération	15,204
Bourg-Péronnas	Bourg-en-Bresse	Stade Marcel-Verchère	11,400
Chambly	Chambly	Stade des Marais	1,000
Châteauroux	Châteauroux	Stade Gaston Petit	17,173
Cholet	Cholet	Stade Pierre Blouen	9,000
Concarneau	Concarneau	Stade Guy Piriou	6,500
Créteil	Paris (Créteil)	Stade Dominique Duvauchelle	12,150
Laval	Laval	Stade Francis Le Basser	18,607
Le Mans	Le Mans	MMArena	25,000
Orléans	Orléans	Stade de la Source	7,000
Red Star	Paris (Saint-Ouen)	Stade Bauer	10,000
Stade Briochin	Saint-Brieuc	Fred-Aubert Stadium	10,600
Sedan	Sedan	Stade Louis Dugauguez	23,189
Sète	Sète	Stade Louis Michel	8,500
Villefranche	Villefranche-sur-Saône	Stade Armand-Chouffet	3,200

=== Number of teams by regions ===
Teams	Region	Team(s)
3	Pays de la Loire	Cholet, Laval and Le Mans
3	Auvergne-Rhône-Alpes	Annecy, Bourg-Péronnas and Villefranche
2	Brittany	Concarneau and Saint-Brieuc
2	Centre-Val de Loire	Châteauroux and Orléans
2	Île-de-France	Créteil and Red Star
2	Hauts-de-France	Boulogne and Chambly
1	Normandy	Avranches
1	Occitanie	Sète
1	Corsica	Bastia-Borgo
1	Grand Est	Sedan

=== Professional status ===
Châteauroux and Chambly retain their professional status having just been relegated to Championnat National. Le Mans and Orléans retain their professional status under section 102 of the administrative rules of the LFP. Red Star have been granted an exemption from section 102 rules due to the health situation, and also retain their professional status.

== League table ==
Pos	Team	Pld	W	D	L	GF	GA	GD	Pts	Promotion or Relegation
1	Laval (C, P)	34	20	7	7	50	31	+19	67	Promotion to Ligue 2
2	Annecy (P)	34	19	9	6	55	30	+25	66	Promotion to Ligue 2
3	Villefranche	34	19	8	7	47	29	+18	65	Qualification to promotion play-offs
4	Concarneau	34	15	13	6	48	31	+17	58	
5	Châteauroux	34	15	10	9	41	28	+13	55	
6	Bourg-Péronnas	34	15	9	10	55	37	+18	54	
7	Stade Briochin	34	14	10	10	47	35	+12	52	
8	Sedan	34	13	11	10	37	37	0	50	
9	Orléans	34	12	11	11	37	35	+2	47	
10	Le Mans	34	12	10	12	35	35	0	46	
11	Red Star (Note: The match between Red Star and Sète on 15 April 2022 was abandoned after 36 minutes, due to repeated incidents of flares being thrown onto the pitch by home fans. The score was 0–1 at the time. Red Star fans were protesting at a potential takeover of the club. On 11 May 2022, the FFF awarded the match to Sète, with the standard 3–0 scoreline in their favour, and deducted Red Star a penalty point.)	34	13	6	15	55	50	+5	44	
12	Avranches	34	12	6	16	37	58	−21	42	
13	Cholet	34	11	8	15	49	62	−13	41	
14	Sète (D, R)	34	10	7	17	35	42	−7	37	Relegation to Championnat National 2
15	Bastia-Borgo	34	7	10	17	40	58	−18	31	
16	Chambly (R)	34	7	8	19	35	62	−27	29	Relegation to Championnat National 2
17	Créteil (R)	34	6	8	20	35	58	−23	26 (Note: Créteil finished ahead of Boulogne on head-to-head points: Créteil 4, Boulogne 1)	Relegation to Championnat National 2
18	Boulogne (Note: Boulogne were penalised after fielding suspended player Ousmane Badji in the game at Stade Briochin on 7 January 2022. The result was originally 1–0, but was amended to 3–0 and Boulogne were deducted a point.) (R)	34	6	9	19	28	48	−20	26	Relegation to Championnat National 2

Source: Soccerway
Rules for classification: 1) head-to-head results; 2) head-to-head goal difference; 3) goal difference; 4) goals scored; 5) fair play points
(C) Champions; (D) Disqualified; (P) Promoted; (R) Relegated

== Promotion play-offs ==
A promotion play-off will be held at the end of the season between the 18th-placed team of the 2021–22 Ligue 2 and the 3rd-placed team of the 2021–22 Championnat National. This will be played over two legs on 26 and 29 May.

=== First leg ===
24 May 2022	Villefranche	1–3	Quevilly-Rouen	Villefranche-sur-Saône
20:30 CEST (UTC+2)	Elisor 28' (pen.)		Soumaré 30', 73'; Padovani 79'	Stadium: Stade Armand Chouffet; Referee: Abdelatif Kherradji

=== Second leg ===
29 May 2022	Quevilly-Rouen	2–0	Villefranche	Le Petit-Quevilly
16:00 CEST (UTC+2)	Nazon 50', 81'			Stadium: Stade Robert Diochon

Quevilly-Rouen won 5–1 on aggregate and therefore both clubs remained in their respective leagues.

== Post-season changes ==
On 21 June 2022, the Direction Nationale du Contrôle de Gestion ruled that Bourg-Péronnas were to be relegated to Championnat National 2 for the 2022–23 season, due to financial mismanagement. On 1 July 2022, the decision was overturned at the appeal hearing.

On 28 June 2022, the DNCG further ruled that Sète would be relegated to Championnat National 2 for the 2022–23 season, due to financial mismanagement. On 12 July 2022, the decision was upheld at the appeal hearing, meaning Bastia-Borgo were reprieved from relegation.

== Top scorers ==
As of games played on 13 May 2022.

Rank	Player	Club	Goals
1	(Senegal) Pape Meïssa Ba	Red Star	21
2	(France) Fahd El Khoumisti	Concarneau	20
3	(France) Geoffray Durbant	Laval	19
4	(France) Thomas Robinet	Châteauroux	18
5	(France) Simon Elisor	Villefranche	17
6	(France) Kévin Farade	Créteil	13
7	(France) Romain Spano	Annecy	11
7	(Madagascar) Alexandre Ramalingom	Sedan	11
7	(Senegal) Cheikh N'Doye	Red Star	11
7	(France) Alexy Bosetti	Annecy	11
