= 2020–21 Coupe de France preliminary rounds, Occitanie =

The 2020–21 Coupe de France preliminary rounds, Occitanie was the qualifying competition to decide which teams from the leagues of the Occitanie region of France took part in the main competition from the seventh round.

A total of nine teams qualified from the Occitanie preliminary rounds. In 2019–20, AS Fabrègues progressed furthest in the main competition, reaching the ninth round before losing to Paris FC 2–0.

== Schedule ==
A total of 514 teams entered from the region. All teams from Régional 1 and below, 496 in total, entered at the first round stage on 23 August 2020. The second round took place on 30 August 2020. The first two qualifying rounds, drawn on 22 July 2020, took place within individual districts of the league. To allow for a balanced draw, eight teams played outside their own district.

The third round draw, including the teams from Championnat National 3, took place on 9 September 2020. The fourth round draw, including the teams from Championnat National 2, took place on 23 September 2020. The fifth round draw, which saw the entry of the single Championnat National side in the region, took place on 6 October 2020. The sixth round draw was made on 22 October 2020.

=== First round ===
These matches are from the Ariège district, and were played on 22 and 23 August 2020.

First round results: Occitanie (Ariège)
Tie no	Home team (tier)	Score	Away team (tier)
1.	EF Saint-Paul avec Mercus (11)	1–4	FC Saint-Girons (8)
2.	FC Pays d'Olmes (9)	3–2	EN Mazères (9)
3.	FC Coussa-Hers (9)	0–6	Luzenac AP (6)
4.	FC Pamiers (8)	4–0	AS Rieux-de-Pelleport (9)
5.	US Montaut (10)	0–5	FC Saverdun (8)
6.	FC Lézat (10)	0–13	FC Foix (7)
7.	US Tarascon (9)	3–0 (Note: Tie won by means of forfeit.)	FC Laroque d'Olmes (9)
8.	ES Fossatoise (8)	2–0	ES Saint-Jean-du-Falga (9)

These matches are from the Aude district, and were played on 22 and 23 August 2020.

First round results: Occitanie (Aude)
Tie no	Home team (tier)	Score	Away team (tier)
1.	Olympique Moussan-Montredon (8)	7–1 (Note: Tie reversed from original draw)	Fleury FC (12)
2.	AS Pexiora (9)	1–3	FC Briolet (8)
3.	FC Alaric-Puichéric (10)	2–3	Salanca FC (Note: Salanca FC are from the Pyrénées-Orientales district.) (9)
4.	FC Caux-et-Sauzens (10)	0–3	MJC Gruissan (8)
5.	AJS Bages (12)	3–2	FC Malepère (10)
6.	FC Saint-Nazairois (10)	1–0	Trèbes FC (7)
7.	FC Corbières Méditerranée (8)	1–2	UF Lézignanais (8)
8.	Razès Olympique (9)	0–4	US Conques (7)
9.	US Salhersienne (10)	0–7	FA Carcassonne (6)
10.	ASC des Îles (12)	1–3	ES Sainte-Eulalie-Villesèquelande (9)
11.	AS Espéraza (11)	2–2 (4–5 p)	Haut-Minervois Olympique (9)
12.	FC Villegly (10)	2–2 (2–4 p)	Olympic Cuxac-d'Aude (9)
13.	Limoux-Pieusse FC (9)	1–0	US Minervois (9)
14.	FC Cougaing (11)	1–5	FC Villedubert (10)
15.	FA Lézignan (12)	1–2	AS Bram (10)
16.	FC Chalabre (9)	3–0 (Note: Tie won by means of forfeit.)	US Montagne Noire (10)
17.	Trapel-Pennautier FC (10)	1–5	CO Castelnaudary (7)
18.	UFC Narbonne (9)	2–0	USA Pezens (7)

These matches are from the Aveyron district, and were played on 21, 22 and 23 August 2020.

First round results: Occitanie (Aveyron)
Tie no	Home team (tier)	Score	Away team (tier)
1.	US Tournemire-Roquefort (13)	0–5	US Espalion (8)
2.	Druelle FC (7)	– (Note: Match abandoned after 65 minutes with scoreline 2–1. FC Monastère penalised. Druelle FC qualify.)	FC Monastère (8)
3.	Union Haut Lévézou (12)	4–2	FC Saint-Juéry (11)
4.	JS Bassin Aveyron (8)	2–0	US Réquistanaise (9)
5.	Pareloup Céor FC (12)	2–2 (5–6 p)	AO Bozouls (10)
6.	AS Aguessac (9)	1–2	Foot Vallon (9)
7.	US Bas Rouergue (9)	1–1 (2–3 p)	SC Sébazac (8)
8.	FC Villeneuvois/Diège (9)	3–1	Ségala-Rieupeyroux-Salvetat (8)
9.	US Montbazens (11)	– (Note: Match abandoned at half time with scoreline 1–2 after potential COVID-19 contact. FC Agen-Gages penalised, US Montbazens qualify.)	FC Agen-Gages (10)
10.	AS Olemps (9)	3–0	Entente Salles Curan/Curan (8)
11.	US Larzac Vallées (11)	2–2 (10–9 p)	Essor de Boussac (11)
12.	US Argence/Viadène (10)	3–1	Association Saint-Laurentaise Cantonale Canourguaise (10)
13.	US Pays Rignacoise (9)	0–2	FC Sources de l'Aveyron (7)
14.	AS Soulages-Bonneval (12)	3–3 (7–6 p)	AS Vabraise (10)
15.	Olympique Martiel (13)	0–4	Luc Primaube FC (7)
16.	SO Millau (9)	4–0	Entente Campuac-Golinhac-Espeyrac (9)
17.	AS Saint-Geniez-d'Olt (11)	0–4	Espoir FC 88 (8)
18.	Entente Costecalde Lestrade Broquiès (11)	0–3	Entente Saint-Georges/Saint-Rome (8)
19.	US Pays Alzuréen (10)	2–1	Foot Rouergue (11)
20.	FC Naucellois (8)	3–3 (5–6 p)	Stade Saint-Affricain (8)
21.	Stade Villefranchois (9)	2–1	JS Lévézou (10)
22.	Entente Villecomtal-Mouret-Pruines-Entraygues (11)	0–7	Onet-le-Château (6)

These matches are from the Gard-Lozère district, and were played on 21, 22 and 23 August 2020.

First round results: Occitanie (Gard-Lozère)
Tie no	Home team (tier)	Score	Away team (tier)
1.	AS Le Malzieu (12)	0–6	Valdonnez FC (12)
2.	AS Chastelloise (12)	3–1	Foot Sud Lozère (10)
3.	Gévaudan FC (14)	2–3	AS Badaroux (12)
4.	ES Rimeize (14)	1–5	ESC Le Buisson (11)
5.	ASC Chanacoise (12)	4–2	FC Montrodat (12)
6.	ES Chirac-Le Monastier (12)	5–0	AS Saint-Georges-de-Lévéjac (13)
7.	Marvejols Sports (11)	0–1	AF Lozère (6)
8.	OC Redessan (9)	0–3 (Note: Tie won by means of forfeit.)	US Salinières Aigues Mortes (6)
9.	Stade Sainte-Barbe (10)	0–3	FC Vauverdois (7)
10.	FC Pont-Saint-Esprit (10)	0–3	JS Chemin Bas d'Avignon (7)
11.	US Montpezat (12)	1–6	AS Rousson (6)
12.	FC Val de Cèze (9)	1–1 (0–3 p)	ES Pays d'Uzes (6)
13.	AS Saint-Privat-des-Vieux (9)	1–1 (4–5 p)	US Trèfle (8)
14.	AS Beauvoisin (11)	0–2	FC Moussac (11)
15.	FC Bagnols Escanaux (13)	1–2	US Garons (10)
16.	FCO Domessargues (11)	3–4	RC Générac (9)
17.	Les Mages Sedisud FC (12)	1–9	ESC Vézénobres (10)
18.	ES Rochefort Signargues (11)	0–2	ES Barjac (10)
19.	AS Nîmes Athletic (9)	6–0	FC Canabier (10)
20.	ES Aigues-Vives/Aubais (10)	0–1	ES Grau-du-Roi (8)
21.	Olympique Saintois (9)	3–0	ES Trois Moulins (9)
22.	FC Chusclan-Laudun-l'Ardoise (8)	6–1	ES Suménoise (9)
23.	AS Saint-Christol-lès-Alès (10)	3–2	SC Manduellois (10)
24.	CA Bessegeoise (10)	3–0	Entente Perrier Vergèze (7)
25.	GC Uchaud (7)	2–2 (4–2 p)	SC Anduzien (7)
26.	SO Aimargues (7)	3–0	FC Bagnols Pont (6)
27.	US Pujaut (11)	0–3	ES Marguerittes (9)
28.	JSO Aubord (11)	5–0	SA Cigalois (10)
29.	AS Cendras (11)	0–8	CO Soleil Levant Nîmes (7)
30.	AEC Saint-Gilles (9)	5–2	US La Regordane (10)
31.	Omnisports Saint-Hilaire-La Jasse (10)	2–3	AS Caissargues (10)
32.	GC Gallician (11)	1–6	AS Poulx (9)
33.	US Monoblet (9)	2–1	EFC Beaucairois (10)
34.	FC Vatan (13)	0–3	GC Quissac (11)
35.	Olympique de Gaujac (11)	0–3	FC Cévennes (10)
36.	Olympique Fourquésien (11)	0–5	FC Langlade (10)

These matches are from the Haute-Garonne district, and were played on 22 and 23 August 2020.

First round results: Occitanie (Haute-Garonne)
Tie no	Home team (tier)	Score	Away team (tier)
1.	Toulouse Métropole FC (6)	3–0	US Plaisance (7)
2.	AS Vallée du Sor (Note: AS Vallée du Sor are from the Tarn district.) (10)	0–1	US Pouvourville (7)
3.	US Encausse-Soueich-Ganties (9)	7–1	Montastruc-de-Salies FC (10)
4.	FC Escalquens (12)	0–7	Entente Boulogne-Péguilhan (7)
5.	US Riveraine (11)	0–3	ERCSO L'Isle-en-Dodon (9)
6.	ES Saint-Hilaire (11)	1–1 (2–3 p)	Toulouse Rangueil FC (8)
7.	AO Cornebarrieu (10)	0–5	Comminges Saint-Gaudens (8)
8.	Football Algérien Toulousain (12)	3–7	JS Brax (10)
9.	Toulouse Olympique Aviation Club (9)	1–3	US Seysses-Frouzins (7)
10.	AS Villeneuve Lécussan (11)	1–3	EFC Aurignac (10)
11.	Espoirs Puymaurinois (12)	0–3 (Note: Tie won by means of forfeit.)	AS Portet-Carrefour-Récébédou (6)
12.	US Venerque (11)	0–3	JS Cintegabelle (8)
13.	US Estadens (12)	0–1	FC Beauzelle (8)
14.	US Ramonville (10)	0–3	Toulouse Rodéo FC (6)
15.	Roques-Confluent Lacroix/Saubens/Pinsaguel (10)	1–0 (Note: Roques-Confluent Lacroix/Saubens/Pinsaguel penalised. AS Lavernose-Lherm-Mauzac qualify.)	AS Lavernose-Lherm-Mauzac (8)
16.	AS La Faourette (12)	2–2 (4–5 p)	Baziège OC (8)
17.	Rieumes FC Savès 31 (13)	0–2	Entente Landorthe-Labarthe-Estancarbon-Savarthès (9)
18.	AS Montmaurin (11)	0–0 (4–3 p)	US Salies-du-Salat/Mane/Saint-Martory (6)
19.	Labège Inter FC (9)	0–4	JS Toulouse Pradettes (8)
20.	AS Castelnau-d'Estrétefonds (8)	5–0	JE Toulousaine Croix-Daurade (9)
21.	Toulouse Football Sud (12)	5–2	Toulouse Foot Compans Caffarelli (10)
22.	US Bouloc Saint-Sauveur (12)	3–0	ES Saint-Simon (8)
23.	AS Pujaudran (Note: AS Pujaudran are from the Gers district.) (11)	2–1	Toulouse ACF (10)
24.	FC Bessières-Buzet (12)	2–0	EF Montjoire-La Magdelaine (13)
25.	US Toulouse (13)	2–3	FC Eaunes/Labarthe-sur-Lèze (8)
26.	US Auriacaise (11)	0–6	AS Tournefeuille (6)
27.	Entente Quatre Rivières (10)	2–7	US Léguevin (8)
28.	AS Mondonville (10)	2–1	UA Fenouillet (8)
29.	Pucho United (12)	4–1	FC Roquettois (12)
30.	EF Castelmaurou Verfeil (10)	5–0	VS Aucamvilloise (Note: VS Aucamvilloise are from the Tarn-et-Garonne district.) (11)
31.	Bruguières SC (11)	3–6	FC Mabroc (8)
32.	Pyrénées Sud Comminges (10)	1–3	Saint-Orens FC (6)
33.	AS Toulouse Lardenne (11)	1–7	L'Union Saint-Jean FC (6)
34.	JS Cugnaux (8)	2–0	JS Carbonne (8)
35.	US Bagnères-de-Luchon Sports Cierp-Gaud-Marignac (9)	0–4	Saint-Alban Aucamville FC (6)
36.	UE Bossòst (10) (Spain)	3–0	Lagardelle Miremont Sports (11)
37.	Entente Naurouze-Labastide (Note: Entente Naurouze-Labastide are from the Aude district.) (9)	1–3	Olympique Girou FC (6)
38.	FC Fonbeauzard (12)	1–7	Étoile Aussonnaise (7)
39.	Lauragais FC (10)	1–2	AS Villemur (10)
40.	FC Mahorais Toulouse (12)	0–6	Avenir Fonsorbais (7)
41.	Fontenilles FC (11)	1–0	JS Auzielle Lauzerville (11)
42.	AS Toulouse Mirail (10)	2–3	Juventus de Papus (6)
43.	US Sainte-Foy Football (12)	1–2	Grenade FC (10)
44.	FC Bagatelle (11)	1–3	US Castelginest (8)
45.	US Bérat (11)	1–6	US Revel (6)
46.	Saint-Lys Olympique FC (10)	0–2	FC Launaguet (8)
47.	FC Canal Nord (11)	0–1	FC Vignoble 81 (Note: FC Vignoble 81 are from the Tarn district.) (9)
48.	US Cazères (6)	1–1 (3–1 p)	US Pibrac (6)

These matches are from the Gers district and were played on 22 and 23 August 2020.

First round results: Occitanie (Gers)
Tie no	Home team (tier)	Score	Away team (tier)
1.	US Aubiet (9)	3–0 (Note: Tie won by means of forfeit.)	Forza Labéjan-Saint-Jean-le-Comtal (9)
2.	SC Solomiac (10)	2–4	Val d'Arros Adour (10)
3.	AS Manciet (9)	0–4	UA Vic-Fezensac (9)
4.	AS Monferran-Savès (10)	0–3	FC Pavien (8)
5.	US Pauilhac-Sainte-Radegonde (9)	1–5	Rassemblement Bas Armangnac FC (10)
6.	FC L'Islois (8)	4–1	SC Saint-Clar (9)
7.	ES Gimontoise (9)	9–0	FC Risclois (10)
8.	US Lectoure (11)	0–5	ES Cologne-Sarrant (9)
9.	Eauze FC (9)	0–3	AS Fleurance-La Sauvetat (7)
10.	US Duran (10)	1–11	Auch Football (6)
11.	JS Tougetoise (8)	0–3	Sainte-Christie-Preignan AS (9)
12.	Mauvezin FC (10)	4–1	Sud Astarac 2010 (9)

These matches are from the Hérault district, and were played on 22 and 23 August 2020.

First round results: Occitanie (Hérault)
Tie no	Home team (tier)	Score	Away team (tier)
1.	Avenir Castriote (11)	3–0 (Note: Tie won by means of forfeit.)	Crabe Sportif Marseillan (11)
2.	RS Gigeannais (10)	3–1	US Pougetoise (11)
3.	AS Gignacois (8)	1–2	GC Lunel (6)
4.	ASPTT Lunel (12)	2–0	AS Mireval (11)
5.	FC Saint-Pargoire (12)	0–2	FO Sud Hérault (8)
6.	RSO Cournonterral (10)	3–2	AS Atlas Paillade (7)
7.	Mèze Stade FC (8)	2–2 (3–1 p)	SC Cers-Portiragnes (6)
8.	ES Cazouls-Marauusan-Maureilham (10)	3–4	Castelnau Le Crès FC (6)
9.	US Mauguio Carnon (8)	– (Note: Match abandoned with scoreline 3–2. PI Vendargues penalised. US Mauguio Carnon qualify)	PI Vendargues (6)
10.	Baillargues-Saint-Brès-Valergues (8)	0–0 (4–2 p)	ES Pérols (8)
11.	Sète OFC (10)	0–10	AS Frontignan AC (6)
12.	FC Maurin (11)	1–1 (3–5 p)	Bouzigues-Loupian AC (11)
13.	AS Saint-Gilloise (9)	1–3	ES Paulhan-Pézenas (10)
14.	Entente Corneilhan-Lignan (9)	0–0 (5–4 p)	AS Canétoise (10)
15.	AS Juvignac (10)	3–1	AS Valerguoise (11)
16.	AS Puissalicon-Magalas (9)	2–2 (6–7 p)	AS Pignan (8)
17.	AS Bessanaise (11)	2–3	CE Palavas (7)
18.	Jacou Clapiers FA (10)	2–0 (Note: Tie reversed from original draw.)	CA Poussan (11)
19.	FC Lamalou-les-Bains (11)	0–7	ES Grand Orb Foot (10)
20.	FC Villeneuve-lès-Béziers (12)	– (Note: Match not played. FC Villeneuve-lès-Béziers penalised for failing to provide a suitable ground. The ground specified by the club had a municipal order prohibiting access. FC Boujan qualify.)	FC Boujan (11)
21.	FC Aspiranais (10)	0–5	AS Lattoise (6)
22.	AS Montarnaud-Saint-Paul-Vaihauques-Murviel (7)	0–4	US Béziers (7)
23.	Stade Montblanais (12)	0–2	Stade Balarucois (6)
24.	FC Sauvian (13)	0–2	FCO Viassois (11)
25.	AS Saint-Martin Montpellier (11)	3–2	ROC Social Sète (10)
26.	Olympique La Peyrade FC (9)	4–1	AC Alignanais (10)
27.	Olympique Midi Lirou Capestang-Poilhes (11)	1–3	USO Florensac-Pinet (9)
28.	Pointe Courte AC Sète (10)	0–3	Entente Saint-Clément-Montferrier (6)
29.	SC Saint-Thibérien (9)	1–2	FC Lespignan-Vendres (9)
30.	BS Cournonsec (13)	0–7	Arceaux Montpellier (8)
31.	AS Saint-Mathieu-de-Tréviers (10)	0–2	FC Sussargues-Berange (10)
32.	AS Pierrots Teyran (11)	0–2	FC Petit Bard (7)
33.	FC Thongue et Libron (11)	0–4	US Montagnacoise (8)
34.	FC Pradéen (11)	1–2	Olympique Saint-André-de-Sangonis (8)
35.	US Villeneuvoise (12)	2–3	La Clermontaise Football (6)
36.	FCO Valras-Serignan (9)	5–0	FC Lavérune (9)
37.	ES Coeur Hérault (11)	1–3	RC Vedasien (8)
38.	US Villeveyracoise (12)	0–6	FC Montpeyroux (11)

These matches are from the Lot district, and were played on 21, 22 and 23 August 2020.

First round results: Occitanie (Lot)
Tie no	Home team (tier)	Score	Away team (tier)
1.	AS Montcabrier (9)	1–1 (7–6 p)	AS Causse Limargue (9)
2.	ES Saint-Germain (10)	1–2	Pradines-Saint-Vincent-Douelle-Mercuès Olt (7)
3.	Uxello FC Capdenac (11)	3–0 (Note: Tie switched from original draw.)	US Assieroise (12)
4.	Puy-l'Évêque-Prayssac FC (9)	2–1	Élan Marivalois (9)
5.	CL Cuzance (11)	0–2	FC Haut Quercy (10)
6.	Val Roc Foot (9)	1–5	FC Biars-Bretenoux (7)
7.	Touzac Malbec FC (12)	1–1 (2–3 p)	FC Lalbenque-Fontanes (8)
8.	Entente Cajarc Cenevières (9)	0–2	Cahors FC (7)
9.	Bouriane FC (9)	1–4	Figeac Quercy (8)
10.	Haut Célé FC (9)	1–2	ES Souillac-Cressenac-Gignac (9)

These matches are from the Hautes-Pyrénées district, and were played on 21, 22 and 23 August 2020.

First round results: Occitanie (Hautes-Pyrénées)
Tie no	Home team (tier)	Score	Away team (tier)
1.	Boutons d'Or Ger (8)	3–1	US Côteaux (9)
2.	Horgues-Odos FC (9)	1–0	FC Ibos-Ossun (10)
3.	Juillan OS (7)	1–3	Séméac OFC (8)
4.	ASC Barbazan-Debat (9)	2–0	Elan Pyrénéen Bazet-Bordères-Lagarde (9)
5.	ASC Aureilhan (8)	1–1 (3–5 p) (Note: Tie reversed from original draw)	US Marquisat Bénac (8)
6.	FC des Nestes (9)	3–2	US Tarbais Nouvelle Vague (9)
7.	FC Mirandais (Note: FC Mirandais are from the Gers district.) (9)	0–1	FC Pyrénées/Vallées des Gaves (8)
8.	FC Bazillac (12)	0–2	ES Haut Adour (8)
9.	FC Val d'Adour (9)	3–0	FC Bordes (10)
10.	FC Plateau-Lannezman (9)	1–3	Tarbes Pyrénées Football (6)
11.	Soues Cigognes FC (8)	0–0 (4–5 p)	FC Lourdais XI (6)
12.	Quand Même Orleix (8)	3–0 (Note: Tie won by means of forfeit.)	Tarbes FC (9)

These matches are from the Pyrénées-Orientales district, and were played on 22 and 23 August 2020.

First round results: Occitanie (Pyrénées-Orientales)
Tie no	Home team (tier)	Score	Away team (tier)
1.	Le Boulou-Saint-Jean-Pla-de-Courts FC (9)	0–4	Céret FC (10)
2.	US Bompas (10)	1–1 (4–5 p)	BECE FC Vallée de l'Aigly (9)
3.	Olympiqu Haut Vallespir (11)	1–4	OC Perpignan (7)
4.	Association Théza Alénya Corneilla FC (9)	1–1 (4–5 p)	Baho-Pézilla FC (9)
5.	RC Perpignan Sud (10)	3–3 (4–3 p)	Elne FC (7)
6.	AS Prades (12)	1–3	AS Bages (10)
7.	FC Cerdagne-Font-Romeu-Capcir (10)	0–4	Cabestany OC (8)
8.	FC Laurentin (8)	0–6	FC Saint-Estève (6)
9.	SO Rivesaltais (8)	2–0	FC Saint-Cyprien (9)
10.	FC Villelongue (9)	0–1	FC Thuirinois (9)
11.	Les Amis de Cédric Brunier (10)	5–1	FC Le Soler (9)
12.	Olympique Villeneuve-de-la-Raho (12)	1–5	Sporting Perpignan Nord (7)

These matches are from the Tarn district, and were played on 21, 22 and 23 August 2020.

First round results: Occitanie (Tarn)
Tie no	Home team (tier)	Score	Away team (tier)
1.	Valence OF (10)	0–2	Sorèze FC (10)
2.	FC Le Garric (10)	0–5	AS Giroussens (8)
3.	Roquecourbe FC (9)	3–4	La Cremade FC (9)
4.	FC Castelnau-de-Lévis (9)	0–2	US Saint-Sulpice (7)
5.	Olympique Lautrec (9)	1–4	La Mygale Le Séquestre Football (9)
6.	Les Copains d'Abord (8)	1–6	FC Marssac-Rivières-Senouillac Rives du Tarn (6)
7.	US Labruguièroise (10)	2–6	FC Graulhet (6)
8.	US Carmaux (10)	5–3	US Cordes (9)
9.	US Albi (8)	2–3	US Castres (8)
10.	AS Lagrave (10)	7–1	US Autan (10)
11.	US Cadalen (10)	0–4	US Gaillacois (8)
12.	AS Briatexte (10)	0–7	Cambounet FC (8)
13.	RC Saint-Benoît (10)	2–3	ASPTT Albi (8)
14.	AS du Fraysse (11)	0–1	Lavaur FC (8)
15.	US Brens (11)	0–7	FC Pays Mazamétain (8)
16.	ACS Labrespy (11)	2–1	FC Labastide-de-Lévis (12)
17.	Réalmont FC (9)	1–5	Saint-Juéry OF (7)
18.	Terssac Albi FC (10)	0–1	ASE Puylaurens (11)
19.	Sport Benfica Graulhet (9)	5–2	ASJ Massals (10)
20.	AS Pampelonnaise (10)	1–2	AF Pays d'Oc 81 (9)

These matches are from the Tarn-et-Garonne district, and were played on 21, 22 and 23 August 2020.

First round results: Occitanie (Tarn-et-Garonne)
Tie no	Home team (tier)	Score	Away team (tier)
1.	Coquelicots Montéchois FC (9)	1–6	Avenir Lavitois (8)
2.	AS Mas-Grenier (8)	1–0	FCUS Molières (8)
3.	Espoir Vazeracais (11)	0–4	Deux Ponts FC (9)
4.	AC Bastidien (9)	1–2	La Nicolaite (9)
5.	AS Stéphanoise (9)	9–0 (Note: Tie reversed from original draw.)	Corbarieu FC (12)
6.	Stade Larrazet-Garganvillar (9)	1–6	Entente Golfech-Saint-Paul-d'Espis (6)
7.	US Malause (11)	0–4	FC Nègrepelisse-Montricoux (8)
8.	JE Montalbanais (10)	1–2	JS Meauzacaise (8)
9.	La Fortunière FC (Note: La Fortunière FC are from Lot district.) (10)	0–10	Montauban FCTG (7)
10.	Saint-Nauphary AC (9)	0–3 (Note: Tie won by means of forfeit.)	AS Bressols (7)
11.	SC Lafrancaisain (9)	1–1 (3–2 p)	Cazes Olympique (7)
12.	Confluences FC (8)	0–3	AA Grisolles (7)

=== Second round ===
These matches are from the Ariège district, and were played on 29 and 30 August 2020.

Second round results: Occitanie (Ariège)
Tie no	Home team (tier)	Score	Away team (tier)
1.	FC Pays d'Olmes (9)	0–2	US Tarascon (9)
2.	FC Saint-Girons (8)	2–3	FC Foix (7)
3.	ES Fossatoise (8)	0–4	Luzenac AP (6)
4.	FC Saverdun (8)	1–3	FC Pamiers (8)

These matches are from the Aude district, and were played on 30 August 2020.

Second round results: Occitanie (Aude)
Tie no	Home team (tier)	Score	Away team (tier)
1.	US Conques (7)	1–0	Olympic Cuxac-d'Aude (9)
2.	Olympique Moussan-Montredon (8)	0–1	Salanca FC (Note: Salanca FC are from the Pyrénées-Orientales district.) (9)
3.	Haut-Minervois Olympique (9)	1–1 (5–6 p)	FC Briolet (8)
4.	FC Saint-Nazairois (10)	2–0	FC Chalabre (9)
5.	UF Lézignanais (8)	5–2	UFC Narbonne (9)
6.	Limoux-Pieusse FC (9)	0–2	CO Castelnaudary (7)
7.	AJS Bages (12)	0–8	FA Carcassonne (6)
8.	AS Bram (10)	1–6	ES Sainte-Eulalie-Villesèquelande (9)
9.	FC Villedubert (10)	0–7	MJC Gruissan (8)

These matches are from the Aveyron district, and were played on 28, 29 and 30 August 2020, with one postponed until 12 September 2020.

Second round results: Occitanie (Aveyron)
Tie no	Home team (tier)	Score	Away team (tier)
1.	US Larzac Vallées (11)	0–2	FC Villeneuvois/Diège (9)
2.	Stade Saint-Affricain (8)	1–1 (4–5 p)	Druelle FC (7)
3.	US Pays Alzuréen (10)	2–1	US Larzac Vallées (11)
4.	Espoir FC 88 (8)	5–1	AS Olemps (9)
5.	JS Bassin Aveyron (8)	1–2	Onet-le-Château (6)
6.	Luc Primaube FC (7)	1–0	FC Sources de l'Aveyron (7)
7.	AS Soulages-Bonneval (12)	5–3	Entente Saint-Georges/Saint-Rome (8)
8.	AO Bozouls (10)	0–1	SO Millau (9)
9.	Union Haut Lévézou (12)	0–7	SC Sébazac (8)
10.	US Montbazens (11)	0–1	US Espalion (8)
11.	Foot Vallon (9)	3–0	Stade Villefranchois (9)

These matches are from the Gard-Lozère district, and were played on 29 and 30 August 2020.

Second round results: Occitanie (Gard-Lozère)
Tie no	Home team (tier)	Score	Away team (tier)
1.	ASC Chanacoise (12)	0–9	US Salinières Aigues Mortes (6)
2.	ESC Le Buisson (11)	2–0	ES Chirac-Le Monastier (12)
3.	CA Bessegeoise (10)	1–4	ES Pays d'Uzes (6)
4.	AS Nîmes Athletic (9)	1–2	GC Uchaud (7)
5.	FC Moussac (11)	1–2	AS Poulx (9)
6.	US Trèfle (8)	2–2 (6–5 p)	AS Rousson (6)
7.	JSO Aubord (11)	0–7	AF Lozère (6)
8.	RC Générac (9)	– (Note: Match abanconed with the scoreline 0–0. AEC Saint-Gilles penalised. RC Générac qualify.)	AEC Saint-Gilles (9)
9.	US Garons (10)	3–4	US Monoblet (9)
10.	Valdonnez FC (12)	1–1 (4–2 p)	SO Aimargues (7)
11.	AS Caissargues (10)	1–3	FC Vauverdois (7)
12.	ES Barjac (10)	3–0	GC Quissac (11)
13.	AS Badaroux (12)	6–1	AS Chastelloise (12)
14.	AS Saint-Christol-lès-Alès (10)	0–3	JS Chemin Bas d'Avignon (7)
15.	ES Marguerittes (9)	2–2 (2–4 p)	FC Chusclan-Laudun-l'Ardoise (8)
16.	FC Langlade (10)	0–1	CO Soleil Levant Nîmes (7)
17.	ESC Vézénobres (10)	0–2	ES Grau-du-Roi (8)
18.	FC Cévennes (10)	0–1	Olympique Saintois (9)

These matches are from the Haute-Garonne district, and were played on 28, 29 and 30 August 2020, with one match postponed.

Second round results: Occitanie (Haute-Garonne)
Tie no	Home team (tier)	Score	Away team (tier)
1.	AS Pujaudran (Note: AS Pujaudran are from the Gers district.) (11)	0–3	Pucho United (12)
2.	UE Bossòst (10) (Spain)	0–3	Comminges Saint-Gaudens (8)
3.	Grenade FC (10)	4–1	Entente Boulogne-Péguilhan (7)
4.	US Castelginest (8)	0–4	ERCSO L'Isle-en-Dodon (9)
5.	FC Launaguet (8)	0–0 (1–4 p)	Toulouse Rangueil FC (8)
6.	US Pouvourville (7)	0–0 (2–4 p)	Olympique Girou FC (6)
7.	US Léguevin (8)	3–3 (4–2 p)	JS Cintegabelle (8)
8.	AS Mondonville (10)	1–3	JS Cugnaux (8)
9.	Baziège OC (8)	3–2	Toulouse Rodéo FC (6)
10.	US Seysses-Frouzins (7)	2–0	AS Castelnau-d'Estrétefonds (8)
11.	EFC Aurignac (10)	1–2	FC Vignoble 81 (Note: FC Vignoble 81 are from the Tarn district.) (9)
12.	EF Castelmaurou Verfeil (10)	2–3	US Revel (6)
13.	US Bouloc Saint-Sauveur (12)	1–5	Toulouse Football Sud (12)
14.	Fontenilles FC (11)	0–7	AS Portet-Carrefour-Récébédou (6)
15.	Étoile Aussonnaise (7)	0–0 (10–11 p)	Toulouse Métropole FC (6)
16.	AS Villemur (10)	0–4	L'Union Saint-Jean FC (6)
17.	FC Bessières-Buzet (12)	3–1	FC Beauzelle (8)
18.	FC Eaunes/Labarthe-sur-Lèze (8)	0–2	Saint-Orens FC (6)
19.	US Encausse-Soueich-Ganties (9)	0–3	Avenir Fonsorbais (7)
20.	JS Brax (10)	3–2	JS Toulouse Pradettes (8)
21.	AS Montmaurin (11)	0–0 (3–4 p) (Note: Tie reversed from original draw.)	AS Lavernose-Lherm-Mauzac (8)
22.	FC Mabroc (8)	0–3	Juventus de Papus (6)
23.	Saint-Alban Aucamville FC (6)	1–3	US Cazères (6)
24.	Entente Landorthe-Labarthe-Estancarbon-Savarthès (9)	0–3	AS Tournefeuille (6)

These matches are from the Gers district and were played on 28, 29 and 30 August 2020.

Second round results: Occitanie (Gers)
Tie no	Home team (tier)	Score	Away team (tier)
1.	FC Pavien (8)	0–0 (3–2 p)	FC L'Islois (8)
2.	ES Cologne-Sarrant (9)	1–1 (3–4 p)	US Aubiet (9)
3.	Val d'Arros Adour (10)	1–4	AS Fleurance-La Sauvetat (7)
4.	ES Gimontoise (9)	1–2	Auch Football (6)
5.	UA Vic-Fezensac (9)	5–2	Mauvezin FC (10)
6.	Rassemblement Bas Armangnac FC (10)	1–4	Sainte-Christie-Preignan AS (9)

These matches are from the Hérault district, and were played on 29 and 30 August 2020, with two postponed until 13 September.

Second round results: Occitanie (Hérault)
Tie no	Home team (tier)	Score	Away team (tier)
1.	Baillargues-Saint-Brès-Valergues (8)	2–2 (4–5 p)	GC Lunel (6)
2.	ES Grand Orb Foot (10)	2–1	AS Juvignac (10)
3.	RS Gigeannais (10)	1–1 (3–4 p)	Stade Balarucois (6)
4.	FC Lespignan-Vendres (9)	4–3	Olympique La Peyrade FC (9)
5.	RSO Cournonterral (10)	4–1	Avenir Castriote (11)
6.	Bouzigues-Loupian AC (11)	1–2	AS Frontignan AC (6)
7.	ES Paulhan-Pézenas (10)	4–2	FC Montpeyroux (11)
8.	Olympique Saint-André-de-Sangonis (8)	2–2 (3–5 p)	FO Sud Hérault (8)
9.	AS Saint-Martin Montpellier (11)	0–2	USO Florensac-Pinet (9)
10.	Arceaux Montpellier (8)	3–0 (Note: Match won by means of forfeit.)	Entente Corneilhan-Lignan (9)
11.	ASPTT Lunel (12)	0–8	AS Pignan (8)
12.	US Montagnacoise (8)	1–3	Castelnau Le Crès FC (6)
13.	FCO Viassois (11)	0–6	US Béziers (7)
14.	RC Vedasien (8)	1–2	Entente Saint-Clément-Montferrier (6)
15.	FC Boujan (11)	0–2	FC Petit Bard (7)
16.	CE Palavas (7)	0–0 (3–4 p)	AS Lattoise (6)
17.	Jacou Clapiers FA (10)	3–2	Mèze Stade FC (8)
18.	FC Sussargues-Berange (10)	2–10	La Clermontaise Football (6)
19.	FCO Valras-Serignan (9)	1–5	US Mauguio Carnon (8)

These matches are from the Lot district, and were played on 29 and 30 August 2020

Second round results: Occitanie (Lot)
Tie no	Home team (tier)	Score	Away team (tier)
1.	Puy-l'Évêque-Prayssac FC (9)	0–2	Cahors FC (7)
2.	Uxello FC Capdenac (11)	3–4	Pradines-Saint-Vincent-Douelle-Mercuès Olt (7)
3.	Figeac Quercy (8)	5–0	FC Lalbenque-Fontanes (8)
4.	AS Montcabrier (9)	0–6	FC Biars-Bretenoux (7)
5.	ES Souillac-Cressenac-Gignac (9)	4–1	FC Haut Quercy (10)

These matches are from the Hautes-Pyrénées district, and were played on 28, 29 and 30 August 2020.

Second round results: Occitanie (Hautes-Pyrénées)
Tie no	Home team (tier)	Score	Away team (tier)
1.	Séméac OFC (8)	2–0	Quand Même Orleix (8)
2.	ES Haut Adour (8)	1–5	Tarbes Pyrénées Football (6)
3.	Boutons d'Or Ger (8)	9–2	Horgues-Odos FC (9)
4.	FC des Nestes (9)	1–1 (6–5 p)	FC Lourdais XI (6)
5.	FC Val d'Adour (9)	1–1 (5–4 p)	ASC Barbazan-Debat (9)
6.	FC Pyrénées/Vallées des Gaves (8)	7–0	US Marquisat Bénac (8)

These matches are from the Pyrénées-Orientales district, and were played on 30 August 2020.

Second round results: Occitanie (Pyrénées-Orientales)
Tie no	Home team (tier)	Score	Away team (tier)
1.	BECE FC Vallée de l'Aigly (9)	1–6	Baho-Pézilla FC (9)
2.	Céret FC (10)	3–0	AS Bages (10)
3.	Cabestany OC (8)	3–2	SO Rivesaltais (8)
4.	FC Thuirinois (9)	2–1	RC Perpignan Sud (10)
5.	Les Amis de Cédric Brunier (10)	0–2	FC Saint-Estève (6)
6.	Sporting Perpignan Nord (7)	1–2	OC Perpignan (7)

These matches are from the Tarn district, and were played on 29 and 30 August 2020.

Second round results: Occitanie (Tarn)
Tie no	Home team (tier)	Score	Away team (tier)
1.	Cambounet FC (8)	1–1 (2–4 p)	Sport Benfica Graulhet (9)
2.	La Mygale Le Séquestre Football (9)	0–4	FC Graulhet (6)
3.	AF Pays d'Oc 81 (9)	0–3	FC Marssac-Rivières-Senouillac Rives du Tarn (6)
4.	Sorèze FC (10)	1–3	AS Lagrave (10)
5.	ASPTT Albi (8)	3–1	US Gaillacois (8)
6.	La Cremade FC (9)	2–2 (4–2 p)	US Saint-Sulpice (7)
7.	ASE Puylaurens (11)	0–5	US Carmaux (10)
8.	ACS Labrespy (11)	0–2	US Castres (8)
9.	AS Giroussens (8)	2–4	Saint-Juéry OF (7)
10.	Lavaur FC (8)	4–2	FC Pays Mazamétain (8)

These matches are from the Tarn-et-Garonne district, and were played on 29 and 30 August 2020.

Second round results: Occitanie (Tarn-et-Garonne)
Tie no	Home team (tier)	Score	Away team (tier)
1.	La Nicolaite (9)	2–0	SC Lafrancaisain (9)
2.	AS Bressols (7)	2–2 (p)	JS Meauzacaise (8)
3.	Montauban FCTG (7)	3–2	AA Grisolles (7)
4.	FC Nègrepelisse-Montricoux (8)	6–1	Deux Ponts FC (9)
5.	AS Mas-Grenier (8)	1–3	Entente Golfech-Saint-Paul-d'Espis (6)
6.	AS Stéphanoise (9)	1–1 (3–1 p)	Avenir Lavitois (8)

=== Third round ===
These matches were played on 18, 19, 20 and 21 September 2020, with one match postponed until 26 September 2020 and two matches to be replayed on 30 September 2020.

Third round results: Occitanie
Tie no	Home team (tier)	Score	Away team (tier)
1.	AS Fleurance-La Sauvetat (7)	2–0	Auch Football (6)
2.	FC Pyrénées/Vallées des Gaves (8)	1–2	ASPTT Albi (8)
3.	US Carmaux (10)	0–3	Sport Benfica Graulhet (9)
4.	FC Val d'Adour (9)	0–1	UA Vic-Fezensac (9)
5.	FC Graulhet (6)	4–2	AS Bressols (7)
6.	Saint-Juéry OF (7)	5–0	Séméac OFC (8)
7.	FC Vignoble 81 (9)	0–2	US Seysses-Frouzins (7)
8.	US Aubiet (9)	0–0 (4–5 p)	Tarbes Pyrénées Football (6)
9.	FC Marssac-Rivières-Senouillac Rives du Tarn (6)	1–1 (3–1 p)	Blagnac FC (5)
10.	US Castres (8)	2–2 (3–4 p)	US Cazères (6)
11.	Boutons d'Or Ger (8)	2–4	AS Portet-Carrefour-Récébédou (6)
12.	Sainte-Christie-Preignan AS (9)	0–3	FC Pavien (8)
13.	FC des Nestes (9)	0–2	La Cremade FC (9)
14.	AS Lagrave (10)	1–7	Balma SC (5)
15.	AF Lozère (6)	1–4	US Salinières Aigues Mortes (6)
16.	Olympique Saintois (9)	0–4	ES Grau-du-Roi (8)
17.	ESC Le Buisson (11)	1–2	US Trèfle (8)
18.	Castelnau Le Crès FC (6)	1–1 (6–5 p)	FC Vauverdois (7)
19.	FC Chusclan-Laudun-l'Ardoise (8)	1–1 (2–4 p) (Note: Match postponed. Rescheduled for 30 September.)	JS Chemin Bas d'Avignon (7)
20.	AS Badaroux (12)	4–0	RC Générac (9)
21.	Arceaux Montpellier (8)	2–6	Entente Saint-Clément-Montferrier (6)
22.	Valdonnez FC (12)	1–4	ES Pays d'Uzes (6)
23.	Jacou Clapiers FA (10)	2–6	CO Soleil Levant Nîmes (7)
24.	US Monoblet (9)	0–2	Olympique Alès (5)
25.	AS Poulx (9)	4–1	GC Uchaud (7)
26.	ES Barjac (10)	1–6	AS Pignan (8)
27.	GC Lunel (6)	1–3	Stade Beaucairois (5)
28.	JS Brax (10)	1–1 (5–4 p)	FC Pamiers (8)
29.	FC Bessières-Buzet (12)	1–2	FC Foix (7)
30.	Avenir Fonsorbais (7)	1–2	Lavaur FC (8)
31.	CO Castelnaudary (7)	2–2 (1–4 p)	Toulouse Rangueil FC (8)
32.	Grenade FC (10)	2–1	FC Briolet (8)
33.	JS Cugnaux (8)	0–0 (2–4 p)	US Léguevin (8)
34.	US Conques (7)	1–0	Baziège OC (8)
35.	Pucho United (12)	2–4	AS Lavernose-Lherm-Mauzac (8)
36.	Saint-Orens FC (6)	0–1	FU Narbonne (5)
37.	US Revel (6)	0–1	FC Alberes Argelès (5)
38.	ES Sainte-Eulalie-Villesèquelande (9)	1–1 (1–4 p)	Comminges Saint-Gaudens (8)
39.	ERCSO L'Isle-en-Dodon (9)	2–5	Luzenac AP (6)
40.	Toulouse Football Sud (12)	2–5	L'Union Saint-Jean FC (6)
41.	US Tarascon (9)	0–13	Toulouse Métropole FC (6)
42.	AS Lattoise (6)	4–1	US Béziers (7)
43.	FC Saint-Nazairois (10)	0–3	RSO Cournonterral (10)
44.	USO Florensac-Pinet (9)	2–1	MJC Gruissan (8)
45.	Salanca FC (9)	0–6	RCO Agde (5)
46.	Céret FC (10)	0–1	FA Carcassonne (6)
47.	Baho-Pézilla FC (9)	2–4	AS Fabrègues (5)
48.	FC Saint-Estève (6)	0–0 (4–5 p)	AS Frontignan AC (6)
49.	ES Grand Orb Foot (10)	2–6	La Clermontaise Football (6)
50.	FO Sud Hérault (8)	1–1 (5–3 p)	FC Lespignan-Vendres (9)
51.	FC Petit Bard (7)	1–0	Cabestany OC (8)
52.	OC Perpignan (7)	4–1	US Mauguio Carnon (8)
53.	FC Thuirinois (9)	1–3	UF Lézignanais (8)
54.	ES Paulhan-Pézenas (10)	1–1 (5–4 p) (Note: Match abandoned with the scoreline 1–0 due to bad weather. Replayed on 30 September.)	Stade Balarucois (6)
55.	Espoir FC 88 (8)	2–0	La Nicolaite (9)
56.	Entente Golfech-Saint-Paul-d'Espis (6)	5–2	Cahors FC (7)
57.	Pradines-Saint-Vincent-Douelle-Mercuès Olt (7)	1–4	Druelle FC (7)
58.	US Espalion (8)	3–3 (2–4 p)	FC Villeneuvois/Diège (9)
59.	FC Biars-Bretenoux (7)	5–2	Juventus de Papus (6)
60.	AS Tournefeuille (6)	0–3	US Castanéenne (5)
61.	US Pays Alzuréen (10)	1–1 (4–5 p)	Luc Primaube FC (7)
62.	AS Stéphanoise (9)	2–2 (7–6 p)	Figeac Quercy (8)
63.	SO Millau (9)	0–1	Onet-le-Château (6)
64.	AS Soulages-Bonneval (12)	3–2	Foot Vallon (9)
65.	ES Souillac-Cressenac-Gignac (9)	0–5	AS Muret (5)
66.	FC Nègrepelisse-Montricoux (8)	1–1 (4–2 p)	Olympique Girou FC (6)
67.	SC Sébazac (8)	0–0 (2–4 p)	Montauban FCTG (7)

=== Fourth round ===
These matches were played on 3 and 4 October 2020.

Fourth round results: Occitanie
Tie no	Home team (tier)	Score	Away team (tier)
1.	La Clermontaise Football (6)	2–1	RCO Agde (5)
2.	AS Portet-Carrefour-Récébédou (6)	1–1 (4–2 p) (Note: AS Portet-Carrefour-Récébédou penalised for fielding too many transferred players. FC Foix qualify.)	FC Foix (7)
3.	FC Alberes Argelès (5)	2–0	FA Carcassonne (6)
4.	US Léguevin (8)	1–4	Toulouse Rangueil FC (8)
5.	UF Lézignanais (8)	0–0 (3–4 p)	US Conques (7)
6.	US Seysses-Frouzins (7)	1–1 (5–3 p)	OC Perpignan (7)
7.	AS Lavernose-Lherm-Mauzac (8)	3–2	Luc Primaube FC (7)
8.	Grenade FC (10)	0–7	FU Narbonne (5)
9.	Canet Roussillon FC (4)	3–0 (Note: Tie reversed from original draw.) (Note: Tie won by means of forfeit.)	Comminges Saint-Gaudens (8)
10.	La Cremade FC (9)	0–0 (5–4 p)	L'Union Saint-Jean FC (6)
11.	JS Brax (10)	1–5	Lavaur FC (8)
12.	Luzenac AP (6)	3–0	Toulouse Métropole FC (6)
13.	ES Pays d'Uzes (6)	1–3	AS Béziers (4)
14.	US Salinières Aigues Mortes (6)	2–1	AS Lattoise (6)
15.	AS Pignan (8)	1–2	Castelnau Le Crès FC (6)
16.	JS Chemin Bas d'Avignon (7)	0–0 (1–3 p)	Olympique Alès (5)
17.	USO Florensac-Pinet (9)	2–0	FO Sud Hérault (8)
18.	RSO Cournonterral (10)	2–5	US Trèfle (8)
19.	AS Poulx (9)	1–6	ES Paulhan-Pézenas (10)
20.	Stade Beaucairois (5)	0–0 (3–1 p)	AS Frontignan AC (6)
21.	AS Badaroux (12)	1–4	AS Fabrègues (5)
22.	Entente Saint-Clément-Montferrier (6)	3–0	FC Petit Bard (7)
23.	CO Soleil Levant Nîmes (7)	0–0 (5–4 p)	ES Grau-du-Roi (8)
24.	Onet-le-Château (6)	4–0	FC Biars-Bretenoux (7)
25.	US Castanéenne (5)	6–0	AS Stéphanoise (9)
26.	ASPTT Albi (8)	1–1 (1–3 p)	Druelle FC (7)
27.	FC Pavien (8)	0–6	US Colomiers Football (4)
28.	AS Fleurance-La Sauvetat (7)	3–2	Balma SC (5)
29.	FC Villeneuvois/Diège (9)	1–6	Tarbes Pyrénées Football (6)
30.	Montauban FCTG (7)	1–1 (4–2 p)	Entente Golfech-Saint-Paul-d'Espis (6)
31.	Espoir FC 88 (8)	0–0 (14–15 p)	AS Muret (5)
32.	AS Soulages-Bonneval (12)	0–2	UA Vic-Fezensac (9)
33.	Sport Benfica Graulhet (9)	0–2	FC Marssac-Rivières-Senouillac Rives du Tarn (6)
34.	US Cazères (6)	0–0 (3–1 p)	FC Graulhet (6)
35.	FC Nègrepelisse-Montricoux (8)	0–2	Saint-Juéry OF (7)

=== Fifth round ===
These matches were played on 17 and 18 October 2020.

Fifth round results: Occitanie
Tie no	Home team (tier)	Score	Away team (tier)
1.	CO Soleil Levant Nîmes (7)	0–4	US Salinières Aigues Mortes (6)
2.	Stade Beaucairois (5)	1–0	FC Sète 34 (3)
3.	US Trèfle (8)	0–6	Olympique Alès (5)
4.	Onet-le-Château (6)	2–2 (4–1 p)	AS Béziers (4)
5.	ES Paulhan-Pézenas (10)	0–0 (5–4 p)	Druelle FC (7)
6.	USO Florensac-Pinet (9)	1–2	Castelnau Le Crès FC (6)
7.	Entente Saint-Clément-Montferrier (6)	3–0	La Clermontaise Football (6)
8.	US Conques (7)	0–1	AS Fabrègues (5)
9.	US Cazères (6)	0–3	Canet Roussillon FC (4)
10.	FC Marssac-Rivières-Senouillac Rives du Tarn (6)	2–2 (4–3 p)	FC Alberes Argelès (5)
11.	Saint-Juéry OF (7)	0–1	Toulouse Rangueil FC (8)
12.	Lavaur FC (8)	2–0	AS Lavernose-Lherm-Mauzac (8)
13.	AS Fleurance-La Sauvetat (7)	0–1	US Colomiers Football (4)
14.	Montauban FCTG (7)	4–3	US Seysses-Frouzins (7)
15.	AS Muret (5)	1–2	Luzenac AP (6)
16.	FC Foix (7)	1–1 (1–4 p)	FU Narbonne (5)
17.	UA Vic-Fezensac (9)	0–2	US Castanéenne (5)
18.	La Cremade FC (9)	0–4	Tarbes Pyrénées Football (6)

=== Sixth round ===
These matches were played on 31 January 2021.

Sixth round results: Occitanie
Tie no	Home team (tier)	Score	Away team (tier)
1.	Lavaur FC (8)	1–2	Entente Saint-Clément-Montferrier (6)
2.	ES Paulhan-Pézenas (10)	0–2	FC Marssac-Rivières-Senouillac Rives du Tarn (6)
3.	Luzenac AP (6)	0–4	US Colomiers Football (4)
4.	Canet Roussillon FC (4)	1–0	Stade Beaucairois (5)
5.	US Castanéenne (5)	0–2	AS Fabrègues (5)
6.	Tarbes Pyrénées Football (6)	2–5	Onet-le-Château (6)
7.	Toulouse Rangueil FC (8)	1–3	Castelnau Le Crès FC (6)
8.	US Salinières Aigues Mortes (6)	0–0 (2–4 p)	Montauban FCTG (7)
9.	FU Narbonne (5)	2–3	Olympique Alès (5)
