= 2017–18 Coupe de France preliminary rounds, Occitanie =

French football competition

The 2017–18 Coupe de France preliminary rounds, Occitanie make up the qualifying competition to decide which teams from the French Occitanie region take part in the main competition from the seventh round.

== First round ==
The first round in the Midi-Pyrénées sector was organised by individual districts. The matches were played on 18, 19 and 20 August 2017.

First round results: Midi-Pyrénées, District de l'Ariège

Tie no	Home team (tier)	Score	Away team (tier)
1.	FC Laroque d'Olmes (10)	1–5	FC Saverdun (10)
2.	FC Lézatois (10)	1–2	FC St Girons (10)
3.	Tarascon FC (10)	2–1	Entente Varilhes/St Jean-de-Verges (10)
4.	EN Mazères (9)	3–0	Vernajoul AC (10)
5.	FC Pays d'Olmes (10)	6–2	FC Coussa-Hers (10)
6.	FC Mirepoix (10)	1–2	AS Rieux-de-Pelleport (10)

First round results: Midi-Pyrénées, District de l'Aveyron

Tie no	Home team (tier)	Score	Away team (tier)
1.	US Pays Alzuréen (10)	1–2 (a.e.t.)	US Réquistanaise (10)
2.	FC Rouquetois (11)	1–4	US Laissac Bertholène (10)
3.	Entente Villecomtal-Mouret-Pruines-Entraygues (11)	1–0	FC Naucellois (9)
4.	US Argence/Viadène (11)	1–2	Entente Campuac-Golinhac-Espeyrac (10)
5.	US Montbazens (11)	1–5 (a.e.t.)	AS Olemps (9)
6.	FC Agen-Gages (11)	0–2	Entente St Georges/St Rome (8)
7.	AS St Geniez-d'Olt (11)	3–1	JS Lévézou (10)
8.	Entente Costecalde Lestrade Broquiès (11)	1–8	US Espalion (10)
9.	AS Vabraise (11)	2–1	US Bas Rouergue (9)
10.	Entente Salles Curan/Curan (10)	3–0	AS Aguessac (9)
11.	FC Villeneuvois/Diège (10)	2–1	US Lapanouse-de-Sévérac (10)
12.	AO Bozouls (11)	0–2	Vallée du Lot Capdenac (9)
13.	FC St Juéry (12)	0–7	Foot Vallon (9)
14.	Inter de Causse Bezonnes (12)	1–6	SO Millau (9)
15.	Association St Laurentaise Cantonale Canourguaise (10)	1–7	JS Bassin Aveyron (8)
16.	ASC Mahorais (12)	2–1	Espoir FC 88 (9)

First round results: Midi-Pyrénées, District de Haute-Garonne

Tie no	Home team (tier)	Score	Away team (tier)
1.	FC Mabroc (9)	2–2 (3–0 p)	US Miramontaise (11)
2.	JS Carbonne (8)	2–1	CIJ Villaudric (13)
3.	US Riveraine (12)	3–1	US Ramonville (9)
4.	US Pouvourville (9)	2–0	US Plaisance (9)
5.	US Léguevin (10)	1–1 (3–0 p)	EF Castelmaurou Verfeil (11)
6.	US Pins-Justaret/Villate (12)	3–1	FC Roquetois (12)
7.	AS Flourens-Drémil-Lafage (11)	2–5	AS Lavernose-Lherm-Mauzac (9)
8.	Toulouse Rangueil FC (10)	5–1	RC Eaunes (11)
9.	JS Toulouse Pradettes (8)	3–1	Toulouse Olympique Aviation Club (9)
10.	Entente Landorthe-Labarthe-Estancarbon-Savarthès (10)	6–2	AS Planéenne (12)
11.	US Encausse-Soueich-Ganties (10)	4–2	Pointis-Inard OC (10)
12.	Entente Boulogne-Péguilhan (8)	2–3	EFC Aurignac (8)
13.	Bagnères Luchon Sports (10)	0–2	UE Bossòst (10)
14.	US Salies-du-Salat/Mane/St Martory (8)	2–1	Pyrénées Sud Comminges (10)
15.	Bruguières SC (10)	2–1	UA Fenouillet (8)
16.	AS Toulouse Mirail (8)	1–5	JS Cintegabelle (9)
17.	Juventus de Papus (8)	7–4	AS Villemur (11)
18.	AS Mondonville (9)	2–1	US Auriacaise (10)
19.	ES St Simon (8)	4–3 (a.e.t.)	FC Mahorais Toulouse (12)
20.	ES Miremontaise (11)	1–4	Lauragais FC (9)
21.	Inter FC (9)	7–0	AS Izards (11)
22.	US Castelginest (8)	1–1 (3–1 p)	AS Castelnau-d'Estrétefonds (8)
23.	JE Toulousaine Croix-Daurade (11)	2–2 (1–4 p)	AS Toulouse Lardenne (11)
24.	FC Beauzelle (8)	5–2	AO Cornebarrieu (11)
25.	Villeneuve FC (9)	4–0	Comminges St Gaudens (9)
26.	AS Labarthe-sur-Lèze (8)	4–0	Toulouse ACF (9)

First round results: Midi-Pyrénées, District du Gers

Tie no	Home team (tier)	Score	Away team (tier)
1.	Eauze FC (10)	0–4	ES Gimontoise (8)
2.	VVA Labéjan (11)	3–1	FC Castéra-Verduzan (10)
3.	FC L'Isle-Jourdain (9)	1–0	Ste Christie-Preignan AS (9)
4.	FC Pavien (9)	5–2	SC St Clar (10)
5.	ES Cologne-Sarrant (11)	1–2	US Aignanaise (9)
6.	Mauvezin FC (12)	0–9	Sud Astarac 2010 (10)
7.	SC Solomiacais (11)	0–3	AS Manciet (11)
8.	FC Vallée de l'Arrats (10)	0–1	UA Vic-Fezensac (9)
9.	US Simorraine (10)	2–0	FC Mirandais (10)
10.	FC Risclois (11)	2–4	US Duran (11)

First round results: Midi-Pyrénées, District des Hautes-Pyrénées

Tie no	Home team (tier)	Score	Away team (tier)
1.	SC Sarrancolinois (12)	5–0	ES Guizerix-Puntous (12)
2.	Horgues-Odos FC (10)	1–2	Elan Pyrénéen Bazet-Bordères-Lagarde (9)
3.	ES Haut Adour (9)	3–1	ASC Aureilhan (9)
4.	FC Val d'Adour (10)	3–2 (a.e.t.)	Entente Luz-Pierrefitte-Arrens (9)
5.	US Marquisat Bénac (10)	4–0	Galan FC (11)
6.	FC Plateau (10)	0–2	Soues Cigognes FC (9)
7.	FC des Nestes (9)	3–3 (3–4 p)	AS Argelès-Lavedan (9)
8.	UST Nouvelles Vauge (10)	6–3 (a.e.t.)	Boutons d'Or Ger (10)
9.	ASC Barbazan-Debat (10)	5–2	FC Ibos-Ossun (10)

First round results: Midi-Pyrénées, District du Lot

Tie no	Home team (tier)	Score	Away team (tier)
1.	Haut Célé FC (10)	1–5	FC Biars-Bretenoux (9)
2.	Val Roc Foot (9)	3–0	FC Quercy Blanc (10)
3.	Bouriane FC (10)	0–2	FC Lalbenque-Fontanes (9)
4.	FC Bégoux-Arcambal (10)	2–3 (a.e.t.)	ES St Germain (10)
5.	AS Montcabrier (10)	0–3	EB Lendou-Montcuq (10)
6.	Lapopoie Olympique (13)	0–3	FC Haut Quercy (10)
7.	CL Cuzance (14)	1–1 (4–2 p)	ES Souillac-Cressenac-Gignac (10)
8.	Entente Cajarc Cenevières (11)	0–4	Élan Marivalois (9)
9.	Entente Ségala (10)	0–2	AS Causse Limargue (10)

First round results: Midi-Pyrénées, District du Tarn

Tie no	Home team (tier)	Score	Away team (tier)
1.	Terrsac Albi FC (10)	1–1 (1–4 p)	US Labruguièroise (9)
2.	Réalmont FC (12)	2–0	Roquecourbe FC (10)
3.	FC Lacaunais (10)	1–12	US St Sulpice (9)
4.	AS Pampelonnaise (10)	1–0 (a.e.t.)	FC Vignoble 81 (9)
5.	FC Castelnau-de-Lévis (10)	1–0	Dourgne-Viviers (9)
6.	AS Briatexte (11)	0–4	Cambounet FC (9)
7.	SO St Amantais (11)	1–6	FC Graulhet (9)
8.	Sorèze FC (11)	2–0	Valence OF (11)
9.	Olympique Lautrec (10)	1–4	Les Copains d'Abord (9)
10.	ES Cagnac (12)	0–9	US Carmaux (9)
11.	La Mygale-Le Séquestre (11)	2–1 (a.e.t.)	AS Giroussens (9)
12.	JS Castres (10)	0–3	Saïx-Sémalens FC (9)
13.	FC Vère-Gresigné (10)	3–3 (2–4 p)	Sport Benfica Graulhet (9)
14.	Fréjairolles-Cambon-Collines (11)	0–4	FC Marssac-Rivières-Senouillac Rives du Tarn (8)
15.	US Mirandolaise (13)	0–5	US Gaillacois (8)
16.	AS Vallée du Sor (11)	3–2	ASPTT Albi (9)
17.	US Brens (12)	0–3	Lavaur FC (9)

First round results: Midi-Pyrénées, District du Tarn-et-Garonne

Tie no	Home team (tier)	Score	Away team (tier)
1.	AS Stéphanoise (10)	0–6	AA Grisolles (7)
2.	Confluences FC (9)	2–2 (5–3 p)	AS Bressols (9)
3.	FT St Sardos-Comberouger-Bouillac (12)	0–4	FC Les 2 Ponts (10)
4.	FCUS Molières (10)	0–2	Coquelicots Montéchois FC (10)
5.	FC Brulhois (10)	0–3 (Note: FC Brulhois penalised for fielding an ineligible player. FC Nègrepelisse-Montricoux qualify. Original scoreline 3–1 (a.e.t.).)	FC Nègrepelisse-Montricoux (10)
6.	AS Mas-Grenier (9)	1–3	La Nicolaite (10)
7.	Stade Larrazet-Garganvillar (10)	1–3 (a.e.t.)	Avenir Lavitois (10)
8.	AC Bastidien (10)	2–3	JS Meauzacaise (9)
9.	SC Lafrancaisain (9)	3–3 (5–6 p)	FC Beaumontois (9)
10.	Entente Montbeton-Lacourt (11)	0–1	Stade Caussadais (11)

=== Languedoc-Roussillon ===
The matches in Languedoc-Roussillon were played on 18, 19 and 20 August 2017.

First round results: Languedoc-Roussillon

Tie no	Home team (tier)	Score	Away team (tier)
1.	AS Badaroux (10)	7–1	FC Grandrieu-Rocles (11)
2.	SC Manduellois (10)	0–5	AS Rousson (7)
3.	ES Trois Moulins (9)	8–1	FC Champclauson AAE (10)
4.	ES Grau-du-Roi (9)	6–3 (a.e.t.)	FC Pays Viganais Aigoual (9)
5.	AS Randonnaise (11)	1–4	AS Chastelloise (10)
6.	EC Coursannais (11)	3–0	AS Lasbordes
7.	FC Villelongue (9)	0–3	OC Perpignan (7)
8.	FC Prémian (11)	0–3	ROC Social Sète (11)
9.	Avenir Castriote (11)	0–3	RSO Cournonterral (10)
10.	AS Lodève (10)	0–3	AS Atlas Paillade (8)
11.	ES Fanjeaux-La Piège (9)	0–8	CO Castelnaudary (7)
12.	ES Arzens (9)	0–2	Razès Olympique (8)
13.	FC Malepère (9)	4–3	US Montagne Noire (9)
14.	Olympique Montréalais (11)	0–8	Limoux-Pieusse FC (9)
15.	Olympic Cuxac-d'Aude (9)	0–4	UF Lézignanais (7)
16.	AS Villepinte (10)	2–4 (a.e.t.)	FC Alzonnais (8)
17.	FC Caux-et-Sauzens (9)	1–2 (a.e.t.)	FC Alaric-Puichéric (8)
18.	FR Vallée du Cougaing (11)	2–3	FC Chalabre (9)
19.	Entente Naurouze-Labastide (8)	0–1	Haut-Minervois Olympique (8)
20.	Luc FC (10)	0–5	Olympique Moussan-Montredon (8)
21.	ES Malvoise (10)	3–0	AS Saissac-Cabardès (10)
22.	FC Corbières Méditerranée (8)	8–3	FC St Nazairois (9)
23.	US Minervois (8)	3–1	AS Bram (9)
24.	FC Vallée du Lauquet (9)	0–5	USA Pezens (7)
25.	FC Villegly (9)	2–1	Omnisport St Papoul (8)
26.	US Salhersienne (9)	3–6	AS Ventenac (11)
27.	FC Villedubert (9)	2–4	Trapel-Pennautier FC (9)
28.	AS Pexiora (9)	1–2	ES Ste Eulalie-Villesèquelande (8)
29.	MJC Gruissan (7)	4–1	SO Rivesaltais (8)
30.	Albères Côte Vermeille	0–3	Cabestany OC (8)
31.	FC Cerdagne-Font-Romeu-Capcir (10)	0–3	Sporting Perpignan Nord (8)
32.	AS Prades (8)	1–4	Perpignan FC Bas-Vernet (7)
33.	Association Théza Alénya Corneilla FC (8)	11–0	Olympique Haut Vallespir (11)
34.	AS Bages (10)	2–4	Elne FC (7)
35.	Baho-Pézilla FC (10)	2–2 (6–3 p)	Ille-sur-Têt FC (8)
36.	Céret-Maureillas FC (9)	4–1	US Bompas (8)
37.	FC Le Soler (8)	1–2	Saleilles OC (10)
38.	Les Amis de Cédric Brunier (11)	1–6	FC Laurentin (7)
39.	FC St Cyprien-Latour (8)	3–0 (Note: FC Thuirinois penalised for fielding ineligible players. FC St Cyprien-Latour qualify. Original scoreline 1–2.)	FC Thuirinois (8)
40.	AS Roujan-Caux (10)	3–1	ES Fraisse-La Salvetat (10)
41.	FC Lamalou (10)	2–15	Entente Corneilhan-Lignan (9)
42.	Olympique Maraussanais Biterrois (11)	1–2	Olympique Midi Lirou Capestang-Poilhes (10)
43.	FC Servian (11)	0–5	Pointe Courte AC Sète (9)
44.	ES Vallée de la Mare (11)	2–4	AS Puissalicon-Magalas (9)
45.	Olympique St-André-de-Sangonis (7)	5–2	ES Sète (11)
46.	Baillargues-St Brès-Valergues (8)	11–0	Pompignane SC (11)
47.	Arsenal Croix d'Argent FC (11)	8–6	FC Neffies (12)
48.	Stade Montblanais Foot (10)	4–1	US Pougetoise (11)
49.	Olympique La Peyrade FC (8)	1–2	USO Florensac-Pinet (9)
50.	US Basses-Cévennes (11)	0–8	Arceaux Montpellier (7)
51.	RS Gigeannais (11)	2–6	PI Vendargues (7)
52.	ASPTT Montpellier (11)	0–6	FC St Pargoire (10)
53.	CA Poussan (9)	0–2	AS Juvignac (9)
54.	Bouzigues-Loupian AC (10)	0–8	GC Lunel (7)
55.	Crabe Sportif Marseillan (9)	2–2 (5–4 p)	FC Petit Bard (7)
56.	US Villeveyracoise (10)	9–2	FC Montpellier Cévennes (11)
57.	ES Pérols (8)	3–0	US Montagnacoise (8)
58.	AS St Martin Montpellier (9)	1–0	SC St Thibery (10)
59.	FC Maurin (9)	1–0	ASPTT Lunel (11)
60.	AS Montarnaud-St Paul-Vaihauques-Murviel (8)	5–5 (1–4 p)	AS Pignan (7)
61.	AS St Gilloise (9)	3–0	US Villeneuvoise (10)
62.	RC Vedasien (8)	3–1 (a.e.t.)	AS St Mathieu-de-Tréviers (9)
63.	ESC Le Buisson (9)	3–0	OM Pontil-Pradel (11)
64.	Vaillante Aumonaise (10)	3–3 (7–6 p)	Entente Chirac-Le Monastier (10)
65.	AS Le Collet-de-Dèze (12)	1–1 (4–2 p)	FC Montrodat (10)
66.	ES Rimeize (11)	1–4	AS St Christol-lès-Alès (9)
67.	AS St Georges-de-Lévéjac (10)	1–2 (a.e.t.)	ES Barjacoise (10)
68.	GS Gardois (9)	4–2	Remoulins FC (9)
69.	AS Bagard (12)	0–3	FC Cévennes (9)
70.	AS Caissargues (8)	5–0	Besseges-St Ambroix FC (10)
71.	EFC Beaucairois (11)	1–4	JS Chemin Bas d'Avignon (7)
72.	FC Moussac (11)	2–8	AS Nîmes Athletic (8)
73.	CS Cheminot Nîmois (10)	1–4	FC Pont-St-Esprit (10)
74.	JSO Aubord (11)	2–5	Entente Perrier Vergèze (8)
75.	OC Bellegarde (10)	2–1	FC Eau Bouillie (12)
76.	US Bouillargues (10)	2–0	USA Canaules (10)
77.	SO Codognan (9)	4–3	FC Canabier (9)
78.	FC Cruviers-Lascours (10)	4–0	GC Gallarguois (9)
79.	RC Générac (8)	2–0	FC Val de Cèze (8)
80.	FC La Calmette (10)	4–1	AFC Nîmes Jeunes Mayotte (11)
81.	Stade Ste Barbe (10)	5–2	SC Nîmois (11)
82.	SC Castanet Nîmes (10)	3–4	US Monoblet (9)
83.	ES Marguerittes (10)	3–1	ES St Bauzély (9)
84.	GC Gallician (9)	7–0	ES Tresques (10)
85.	FC Vauverdois (8)	6–0	ES Théziers (10)
86.	Olympique Saintois (9)	4–1	FC Rodilhan (10)
87.	AS St Paulet (9)	2–1	AEC St Gilles (8)
88.	ES Suménoise (9)	3–1	OC Redessan (9)
89.	ES Rochefort Signargues (9)	1–2	ES St Jean-du-Pin (11)
90.	RC St Laurent-des-Arbres (10)	3–0	FC St Jeannais (12)
91.	Omnisports St Hilaire-La Jasse (9)	1–2	AS Vaunage (10)
92.	FCO Valras-Serignan (10)	2–1	FC Lespignan-Vendres (9)
93.	FC Lavérune (10)	6–0	ASP Teyran (11)
94.	Olympique Fourquesien (8)	3–1	US Garons (10)
95.	Salanca FC (9)	0–1	BECE FC Vallée de l'Aigly (8)
96.	AC Alignanais (9)	0–2	Stade Balarucois (7)
97.	SC Jacou (9)	1–5	Mèze Stade FC (7)
98.	SO Lansarguois (9)	3–2	RC St Georges-d'Orques (10)
99.	US Lunel-Vielloise (9)	7–0	ES Aigues-Vives-Aubais (10)
100.	SO Aimargues (7)	0–3	CO Soleil Levant Nîmes (7)
101.	AS Poulx (9)	3–0 (a.e.t.)	GC Quissacois (10)
102.	US Trèfle (8)	6–2	Olympique St Ambroisien (12)
103.	Nîmes Lasallien (8)	2–0	FC Langlade (10)
104.	ES Cazouls-Maraussan-Maureilhan (10)	3–0 (Note: UFC Narbonne penalised (reason unknown). ES Cazouls-Maraussan-Maureilhan qualify. Original scoreline 2–7.)	UFC Narbonne (9)
105.	ES Bassan (10)	1–3	AS Canétoise (8)
106.	SC Cers-Portiragnes (7)	4–2	FO Sud Hérault (9)
107.	FC Pradéen (9)	14–0	Montpellier Mosson Massane (11)
108.	FC Sussargues-Berange (9)	1–3	US Mauguio Carnon (8)

== Second round ==
=== Midi-Pyrénées ===
The second round in the Midi-Pyrénées sector is organised by individual districts. The matches were played on 25, 26 and 27 August 2017.

Second round results: Midi-Pyrénées, District de l'Ariège

Tie no	Home team (tier)	Score	Away team (tier)
1.	EN Mazères (9)	1–5	FC Foix (7)
2.	FC Saverdun (10)	1–2	FC Pamiers (7)
3.	Tarascon FC (10)	0–3	ES St Jean-du-Falga (8)
4.	FC St Girons (10)	4–2 (a.e.t.)	FC Pays d'Olmes (10)
5.	AS Rieux-de-Pelleport (10)	0–5	ES Fossatoise (8)

Second round results: Midi-Pyrénées, District de l'Aveyron

Tie no	Home team (tier)	Score	Away team (tier)
1.	Entente Salles Curan/Curan (10)	1–0	FC Monastère (9)
2.	Entente Campuac-Golinhac-Espeyrac (10)	3–5	CS Sévérac (8)
3.	FC Villeneuvois/Diège (10)	2–0	Foot Vallon (9)
4.	AS Olemps (9)	0–1	Ségala-Rieupeyroux-Salvetat (8)
5.	JS Bassin Aveyron (8)	2–1	SC Sébazac (8)
6.	AS Vabraise (11)	3–4	Stade Villefranchois (8)
7.	AS St Geniez-d'Olt (11)	1–3 (a.e.t.)	Stade St Affricain (8)
8.	US Espalion (10)	4–4 (0–3 p)	US Pays Rignacoise (8)
9.	Vallée du Lot Capdenac (9)	0–1	Druelle FC (8)
10.	SO Millau (9)	7–0	US Laissac Bertholène (10)
11.	ASC Mahorais (12)	2–4	Entente St Georges/St Rome (8)
12.	Entente Villecomtal-Mouret-Pruines-Entraygues (11)	0–3	US Réquistanaise (10)

Second round results: Midi-Pyrénées, District de Haute-Garonne

Tie no	Home team (tier)	Score	Away team (tier)
1.	AS Mondonville (9)	4–0	US Encausse-Soueich-Ganties (10)
2.	EFC Aurignac (8)	3–1	Entente Landorthe-Labarthe-Estancarbon-Savarthès (10)
3.	AS L'Union (7)	0–3	US Cazères (7)
4.	US Pins-Justaret/Villate (12)	0–4	Bruguières SC (10)
5.	JS Toulouse Pradettes (8)	1–4	AS Portet-Carrefour-Récébédou (7)
6.	Toulouse Rangueil FC (10)	2–1	US Salies-du-Salat/Mane/St Martory (8)
7.	US Seysses-Frouzins (7)	7–0	AS Toulouse Lardenne (11)
8.	Lauragais FC (9)	0–0 (6–5 p)	FC Beauzelle (8)
9.	St Orens FC (7)	0–2	Saint-Alban Aucamville FC (7)
10.	Villeneuve FC (9)	0–1	ERCSO L'Isle-en-Dodon (8)
11.	US Riveraine (12)	0–5	US Pibrac (7)
12.	Beaupuy-Montrabé-St Jean FC (7)	1–2	AS Lavernose-Lherm-Mauzac (9)
13.	Avenir Fonsorbais (7)	0–1	JS Carbonne (8)
14.	FC Launaguet (8)	2–0 (a.e.t.)	Baziège OC (8)
15.	US Léguevin (10)	2–0	UE Bossòst (10)
16.	US Castelginest (8)	0–3	JS Cugnaux (8)
17.	ES St Simon (8)	3–0	FC Mabroc (9)
18.	US Pouvourville (9)	1–2	AS Tournefeuille (7)
19.	Juventus de Papus (8)	2–1	Inter FC (9)
20.	AS Labarthe-sur-Lèze (8)	4–0	JS Cintegabelle (9)

Second round results: Midi-Pyrénées, District du Gers

Tie no	Home team (tier)	Score	Away team (tier)
1.	US Duran (11)	4–1	VVA Labéjan (11)
2.	AS Manciet (11)	3–4	UA Vic-Fezensac (9)
3.	Sud Astarac 2010 (10)	1–2	ES Gimontoise (8)
4.	FC L'Isle-Jourdain (9)	4–1	US Simorraine (10)
5.	US Aignanaise (9)	2–0	FC Pavien (9)

Second round results: Midi-Pyrénées, District des Hautes-Pyrénées

Tie no	Home team (tier)	Score	Away team (tier)
1.	Soues Cigognes FC (9)	4–1	ASC Barbazan-Debat (10)
2.	ES Haut Adour (9)	3–1	US Marquisat Bénac (10)
3.	SC Sarrancolinois (12)	0–2	Elan Pyrénéen Bazet-Bordères-Lagarde (9)
4.	AS Argelès-Lavedan (9)	1–0	FC Val d'Adour (10)
5.	Juillan OS (7)	1–1 (3–2 p)	Quand Même Orleix (8)
6.	UST Nouvelles Vauge (10)	0–3	Séméac OFC (7)

Second round results: Midi-Pyrénées, District du Lot

Tie no	Home team (tier)	Score	Away team (tier)
1.	Cahors FC (8)	2–0	Figeac Quercy (8)
2.	EB Lendou-Montcuq (10)	0–3	Val Roc Foot (9)
3.	FC Biars-Bretenoux (9)	7–0	Puy-l'Évêque-Prayssac FC (9)
4.	FC Lalbenque-Fontanes (9)	2–1	ES St Germain (10)
5.	CL Cuzance (14)	0–5	Élan Marivalois (9)
6.	FC Haut Quercy (10)	1–3	AS Causse Limargue (10)

Second round results: Midi-Pyrénées, District du Tarn

Tie no	Home team (tier)	Score	Away team (tier)
1.	AS Pampelonnaise (10)	4–1	FC Castelnau-de-Lévis (10)
2.	US Carmaux (9)	2–3	US St Sulpice (9)
3.	US Labruguièroise (9)	2–5	Saïx-Sémalens FC (9)
4.	FC Marssac-Rivières-Senouillac Rives du Tarn (8)	4–3	US Gaillacois (8)
5.	Cambounet FC (9)	1–0	St Juéry OF (8)
6.	Réalmont FC (12)	1–1 (6–5 p)	US Castres (8)
7.	Sorèze FC (11)	0–4	FC Pays Mazamétain (8)
8.	La Mygale-Le Séquestre (11)	2–5	Sport Benfica Graulhet (9)
9.	FC Graulhet (9)	3–1	Lavaur FC (9)
10.	AS Vallée du Sor (11)	1–6	Les Copains d'Abord (9)

Second round results: Midi-Pyrénées, District du Tarn-et-Garonne

Tie no	Home team (tier)	Score	Away team (tier)
1.	JS Meauzacaise (9)	3–1	Confluences FC (9)
2.	AA Grisolles (7)	4–2	Cazes Olympique (7)
3.	Coquelicots Montéchois FC (10)	0–1	Stade Caussadais (11)
4.	FC Nègrepelisse-Montricoux (10)	2–1	FC Les 2 Ponts (10)
5.	La Nicolaite (10)	1–0 (a.e.t.)	Avenir Lavitois (10)
6.	FC Beaumontois (9)	1–5	Montauban FCTG (7)

=== Languedoc-Roussillon ===
These matches were played on 25, 26 and 27 August 2017.

Second round results: Languedoc-Roussillon

Tie no	Home team (tier)	Score	Away team (tier)
1.	AS Canétoise (8)	3–2	US Béziers (7)
2.	ESC Le Buisson (9)	6–4 (a.e.t.)	Marvejols Sports (10)
3.	Olympique Moussan-Montredon (8)	3–2	USA Pezens (7)
4.	AS Pignan (7)	5–1	US Villeveyracoise (10)
5.	FC St Pargoire (10)	1–2	Stade Balarucois (7)
6.	Arsenal Croix d'Argent FC (11)	1–1 (5–4 p)	AS Atlas Paillade (8)
7.	ROC Social Sète (11)	0–3	Mèze Stade FC (7)
8.	Baillargues-St Brès-Valergues (8)	4–0	Olympique St-André-de-Sangonis (7)
9.	Stade Montblanais Foot (10)	4–1	Pointe Courte AC Sète (9)
10.	AS Roujan-Caux (10)	2–1	Olympique Midi Lirou Capestang-Poilhes (10)
11.	BECE FC Vallée de l'Aigly (8)	0–0 (2–4 p)	FC Laurentin (7)
12.	Elne FC (7)	0–5	OC Perpignan (7)
13.	Association Théza Alénya Corneilla FC (8)	2–1 (a.e.t.)	Perpignan FC Bas-Vernet (7)
14.	Cabestany OC (8)	0–1	Sporting Perpignan Nord (8)
15.	US Mauguio Carnon (8)	0–2	Arceaux Montpellier (7)
16.	Vaillante Aumonaise (10)	2–3 (a.e.t.)	AS Badaroux (10)
17.	ES Barjacoise (10)	0–4	AS St Christol-lès-Alès (9)
18.	FC St Cyprien-Latour (8)	1–0	FC St Estève (6)
19.	ES Suménoise (9)	1–2 (a.e.t.)	AS Vaunage (10)
20.	AS St Paulet (9)	3–3 (3–5 p)	RC St Laurent-des-Arbres (10)
21.	ES Marguerittes (10)	1–7	AS Rousson (7)
22.	FC Cruviers-Lascours (10)	3–2	FC La Calmette (10)
23.	Olympique Saintois (9)	3–2	FC Pont-St-Esprit (10)
24.	GC Gallician (9)	5–5 (4–5 p)	AS Nîmes Athletic (8)
25.	Olympique Fourquesien (8)	1–3	Nîmes Lasallien (8)
26.	AS Caissargues (8)	1–4	JS Chemin Bas d'Avignon (7)
27.	GS Gardois (9)	4–2	OC Bellegarde (10)
28.	Entente Perrier Vergèze (8)	0–3	GC Lunel (7)
29.	AS Chastelloise (10)	4–1	AS Le Collet-de-Dèze (12)
30.	FC Corbières Méditerranée (8)	2–0	AS Ventenac (11)
31.	Trapel-Pennautier FC (9)	3–2	FC Villegly (9)
32.	USO Florensac-Pinet (9)	0–3	Castelnau Le Crès FC (6)
33.	SO Codognan (9)	0–4	ES Pays d'Uzes (6)
34.	US Bouillargues (10)	0–16	GC Uchaud (6)
35.	Stade Ste Barbe (10)	0–1	AS St Privat-des-Vieux (7)
36.	FC Vauverdois (8)	1–3	FC Bagnols Pont (6)
37.	ES Trois Moulins (9)	3–4	FC Cévennes (9)
38.	AS Poulx (9)	0–10	US Salinières Aigues Mortes (6)
39.	CO Castelnaudary (7)	1–2 (a.e.t.)	Trèbes FC (7)
40.	MJC Gruissan (7)	3–2	FC Briolet (7)
41.	FC Alzonnais (8)	1–11	US Conques (6)
42.	AS Juvignac (9)	2–6	La Clermontaise Football (7)
43.	RC Vedasien (8)	1–7	AS Lattoise (6)
44.	Limoux-Pieusse FC (9)	0–3	FA Carcassonne (6)
45.	Razès Olympique (8)	0–3	ES Ste Eulalie-Villesèquelande (8)
46.	FC Malepère (9)	1–2	FC Alaric-Puichéric (8)
47.	UF Lézignanais (7)	2–1	EC Coursannais (11)
48.	Céret-Maureillas FC (9)	0–6	FC Alberes Argelès (6)
49.	RSO Cournonterral (10)	0–2	CE Palavas (6)
50.	ES Pérols (8)	0–3	Entente St Clément-Montferrier (6)
51.	FC Chalabre (9)	2–7	Haut-Minervois Olympique (8)
52.	ES Malvoise (10)	0–10	US Minervois (8)
53.	Saleilles OC (10)	0–10	AS Perpignan Méditerranée (7)
54.	Entente Corneilhan-Lignan (9)	4–2	AS Gignacois (7)
55.	FC Lavérune (10)	2–0	Crabe Sportif Marseillan (9)
56.	FCO Valras-Serignan (10)	1–2	AS Frontignan AC (7)
57.	SO Lansarguois (9)	1–5	PI Vendargues (7)
58.	US Trèfle (8)	13–0	ES St Jean-du-Pin (11)
59.	US Monoblet (9)	0–2	SC Anduzien (7)
60.	ES Grau-du-Roi (9)	3–1 (a.e.t.)	FC Chusclan-Laudun-l'Ardoise (7)
61.	AS Puissalicon-Magalas (9)	0–4	SC Cers-Portiragnes (7)
62.	US Lunel-Vielloise (9)	2–4 (a.e.t.)	CO Soleil Levant Nîmes (7)
63.	RC Générac (8)	0–2	Stade Beaucairois (6)
64.	AS St Martin Montpellier (9)	0–4	AS St Gilloise (9)
65.	ES Cazouls-Maraussan-Maureilhan (10)	2–1	Baho-Pézilla FC (10)
66.	FC Maurin (9)	0–2	FC Pradéen (9)

== Third round ==
=== Midi-Pyrénées ===
These matches were played on 8, 9 and 10 September 2017.

Third round results: Midi-Pyrénées

Tie no	Home team (tier)	Score	Away team (tier)
1.	Juillan OS (7)	1–6	ES Fossatoise (8)
2.	Soues Cigognes FC (9)	5–0	FC St Girons (10)
3.	FC Pamiers (7)	1–2	Luzenac AP (5)
4.	UA Vic-Fezensac (9)	0–3	Auch Football (6)
5.	US Aignanaise (9)	1–3	FC L'Isle-Jourdain (9)
6.	US Duran (11)	2–2 (4–2 p)	EFC Aurignac (8)
7.	JS Carbonne (8)	1–4	Séméac OFC (7)
8.	ES St Jean-du-Falga (8)	1–0	Elan Pyrénéen Bazet-Bordères-Lagarde (9)
9.	AS Argelès-Lavedan (9)	1–2	AS Muretaine (6)
10.	ES Haut Adour (9)	3–5	FC Foix (7)
11.	ES Gimontoise (8)	0–1	FC Lourdais XI (6)
12.	Stade Caussadais (11)	1–6	Montauban FCTG (7)
13.	FC Nègrepelisse-Montricoux (10)	2–4	AS Labarthe-sur-Lèze (8)
14.	La Nicolaite (10)	2–3	AS Fleurance-La Sauvetat (6)
15.	JS Cugnaux (8)	2–1	ERCSO L'Isle-en-Dodon (8)
16.	AS Lavernose-Lherm-Mauzac (9)	1–1 (5–3 p)	Étoile Aussonnaise (6)
17.	US St Sulpice (9)	5–1	JS Meauzacaise (9)
18.	AA Grisolles (7)	0–2	US Cazères (7)
19.	Bruguières SC (10)	1–5	Blagnac FC (5)
20.	Sport Benfica Graulhet (9)	0–1	FC Marssac-Rivières-Senouillac Rives du Tarn (8)
21.	AS Mondonville (9)	4–2	US Léguevin (10)
22.	Juventus de Papus (8)	1–3	US Castanéenne (5)
23.	Réalmont FC (12)	0–4	Toulouse Métropole FC (6)
24.	Toulouse Rangueil FC (10)	0–5	US Pibrac (7)
25.	US Seysses-Frouzins (7)	1–3	Entente Golfech-St Paul-d'Espis (6)
26.	AS Portet-Carrefour-Récébédou (7)	1–2	Toulouse Rodéo FC (5)
27.	Lauragais FC (9)	2–3	Olympique Girou FC (6)
28.	FC Lalbenque-Fontanes (9)	3–2 (a.e.t.)	Val Roc Foot (9)
29.	AS Tournefeuille (7)	1–1 (4–2 p)	ES St Simon (8)
30.	AS Pampelonnaise (10)	2–2 (2–4 p)	Cahors FC (8)
31.	Cambounet FC (9)	1–3	Élan Marivalois (9)
32.	AS Causse Limargue (10)	0–2	Pradines-St Vincent-Douelle-Mercuès Olt (6)
33.	FC Biars-Bretenoux (9)	3–1	FC Launaguet (8)
34.	Entente St Georges/St Rome (8)	4–1	US Revel (6)
35.	Druelle FC (8)	1–2 (a.e.t.)	SO Millau (9)
36.	Saint-Alban Aucamville FC (7)	2–1	Stade Villefranchois (8)
37.	Entente Salles Curan/Curan (10)	0–7	Luc Primaube FC (6)
38.	Stade St Affricain (8)	1–0	Saïx-Sémalens FC (9)
39.	CS Sévérac (8)	0–1	US Pays Rignacoise (8)
40.	FC Graulhet (9)	1–1 (3–2 p)	FC Villeneuvois/Diège (10)
41.	Ségala-Rieupeyroux-Salvetat (8)	1–2	Balma SC (5)
42.	Les Copains d'Abord (9)	1–6	US Albi (6)
43.	US Réquistanaise (10)	2–0	Onet-le-Château (6)
44.	JS Bassin Aveyron (8)	3–0	FC Pays Mazamétain (8)

=== Languedoc-Roussillon ===
These matches were played on 9 and 10 September 2017.

Third round results: Languedoc-Roussillon

Tie no	Home team (tier)	Score	Away team (tier)
1.	FC Alaric-Puichéric (8)	1–5	Castelnau Le Crès FC (6)
2.	FA Carcassonne (6)	2–0	AS Pignan (7)
3.	CO Soleil Levant Nîmes (7)	2–0	AS St Privat-des-Vieux (7)
4.	GC Lunel (7)	0–1	US Salinières Aigues Mortes (6)
5.	GS Gardois (9)	0–1	SC Anduzien (7)
6.	Trapel-Pennautier FC (9)	3–4	ESC Le Buisson (9)
7.	Arsenal Croix d'Argent FC (11)	1–2	Olympique Alès (5)
8.	FC St Cyprien-Latour (8)	0–4	GC Uchaud (6)
9.	Stade Balarucois (7)	0–2	La Clermontaise Football (7)
10.	AS Vaunage (10)	0–3	Entente St Clément-Montferrier (6)
11.	AS Badaroux (10)	1–3	AS Canétoise (8)
12.	UF Lézignanais (7)	0–2	Canet Roussillon FC (5)
13.	FC Lavérune (10)	1–4 (a.e.t.)	FC Alberes Argelès (6)
14.	Haut-Minervois Olympique (8)	0–1	FC Bagnols Pont (6)
15.	SC Cers-Portiragnes (7)	5–1	AF Lozère (5)
16.	AS St Christol-lès-Alès (9)	1–3	RCO Agde (5)
17.	AS Roujan-Caux (10)	0–3	ES Cazouls-Maraussan-Maureilhan (10)
18.	AS Chastelloise (10)	0–8	FU Narbonne (5)
19.	FC Cruviers-Lascours (10)	1–4	US Conques (6)
20.	Olympique Saintois (9)	0–1	Trèbes FC (7)
21.	ES Ste Eulalie-Villesèquelande (8)	1–3	Baillargues-St Brès-Valergues (8)
22.	AS Frontignan AC (7)	5–0	AS Lattoise (6)
23.	US Minervois (8)	0–4	Stade Beaucairois (6)
24.	FC Laurentin (7)	4–2	FC Corbières Méditerranée (8)
25.	FC Pradéen (9)	2–3	PI Vendargues (7)
26.	Stade Montblanais Foot (10)	1–5	AS Fabrègues (5)
27.	RC St Laurent-des-Arbres (10)	3–2	Olympique Moussan-Montredon (8)
28.	OC Perpignan (7)	4–0	CE Palavas (6)
29.	Association Théza Alénya Corneilla FC (8)	2–4	ES Pays d'Uzes (6)
30.	Entente Corneilhan-Lignan (9)	2–1	Mèze Stade FC (7)
31.	US Trèfle (8)	2–4 (a.e.t.)	MJC Gruissan (7)
32.	ES Grau-du-Roi (9)	0–2	Arceaux Montpellier (7)
33.	FC Cévennes (9)	1–0	AS St Gilloise (9)
34.	Sporting Perpignan Nord (8)	1–2	AS Perpignan Méditerranée (7)
35.	AS Nîmes Athletic (8)	0–1	JS Chemin Bas d'Avignon (7)
36.	Nîmes Lasallien (8)	1–2	AS Rousson (7)

== Fourth round ==
=== Midi-Pyrénées ===
These matches were played on 23 and 24 September 2017.

Fourth round results: Midi-Pyrénées

Tie no	Home team (tier)	Score	Away team (tier)
1.	ES St Jean-du-Falga (8)	0–4	FC Lourdais XI (6)
2.	Toulouse Métropole FC (6)	2–1	Entente Golfech-St Paul-d'Espis (6)
3.	JS Cugnaux (8)	0–1	US Colomiers Football (4)
4.	Élan Marivalois (9)	0–1 (a.e.t.)	FC Marssac-Rivières-Senouillac Rives du Tarn (8)
5.	Montauban FCTG (7)	2–0	US Castanéenne (5)
6.	US Cazères (7)	1–2	Tarbes Pyrénées Football (4)
7.	Saint-Alban Aucamville FC (7)	2–2 (4–2 p)	Entente St Georges/St Rome (8)
8.	JS Bassin Aveyron (8)	1–4	Blagnac FC (5)
9.	SO Millau (9)	1–3	US Albi (6)
10.	US Réquistanaise (10)	1–2	Stade St Affricain (8)
11.	US Pays Rignacoise (8)	3–5 (a.e.t.)	Luc Primaube FC (6)
12.	US Pibrac (7)	1–5 (a.e.t.)	Toulouse Rodéo FC (5)
13.	FC Biars-Bretenoux (9)	1–3	Olympique Girou FC (6)
14.	AS Labarthe-sur-Lèze (8)	1–3	AS Muretaine (6)
15.	Cahors FC (8)	0–2	Pradines-St Vincent-Douelle-Mercuès Olt (6)
16.	US St Sulpice (9)	1–4	AS Mondonville (9)
17.	FC Lalbenque-Fontanes (9)	2–3	AS Tournefeuille (7)
18.	FC L'Isle-Jourdain (9)	1–1 (4–2 p)	Soues Cigognes FC (9)
19.	ES Fossatoise (8)	2–4	AS Fleurance-La Sauvetat (6)
20.	FC Foix (7)	0–7	Luzenac AP (5)
21.	Séméac OFC (7)	1–4	Auch Football (6)
22.	US Duran (11)	0–1	AS Lavernose-Lherm-Mauzac (9)
23.	FC Graulhet (9)	0–0 (3–4 p)	Balma SC (5)

=== Languedoc-Roussillon ===
These matches were played on 23 and 24 September 2017.

Fourth round results: Languedoc-Roussillon

Tie no	Home team (tier)	Score	Away team (tier)
1.	OC Perpignan (7)	1–1 (3–4 p)	Olympique Alès (5)
2.	AS Perpignan Méditerranée (7)	1–0	La Clermontaise Football (7)
3.	SC Cers-Portiragnes (7)	0–2	RCO Agde (5)
4.	Baillargues-St Brès-Valergues (8)	2–4	US Conques (6)
5.	ES Pays d'Uzes (6)	3–2	AS Frontignan AC (7)
6.	Entente Corneilhan-Lignan (9)	0–6	Stade Beaucairois (6)
7.	FC Cévennes (9)	2–4 (a.e.t.)	FC Sète 34 (4)
8.	AS Canétoise (8)	0–1	AS Fabrègues (5)
9.	SC Anduzien (7)	6–1	FC Laurentin (7)
10.	Trèbes FC (7)	0–3	FU Narbonne (5)
11.	ESC Le Buisson (9)	0–2	Canet Roussillon FC (5)
12.	US Salinières Aigues Mortes (6)	1–2 (a.e.t.)	AS Rousson (7)
13.	GC Uchaud (6)	1–4	FC Alberes Argelès (6)
14.	FC Bagnols Pont (6)	5–1	MJC Gruissan (7)
15.	Entente St Clément-Montferrier (6)	3–2	CO Soleil Levant Nîmes (7)
16.	RC St Laurent-des-Arbres (10)	1–8	ES Paulhan-Pézenas (4)
17.	JS Chemin Bas d'Avignon (7)	3–1	PI Vendargues (7)
18.	ES Cazouls-Maraussan-Maureilhan (10)	0–3	Castelnau Le Crès FC (6)
19.	Arceaux Montpellier (7)	4–2	FA Carcassonne (6)

== Fifth round ==
=== Midi-Pyrénées ===
These matches were played on 7 October 2017.

Fifth round results: Midi-Pyrénées

Tie no	Home team (tier)	Score	Away team (tier)
1.	Toulouse Rodéo FC (5)	2–1	Toulouse Métropole FC (6)
2.	AS Muretaine (6)	0–2	US Colomiers Football (4)
3.	US Albi (6)	1–1 (1–3 p)	AS Tournefeuille (7)
4.	AS Fleurance-La Sauvetat (6)	3–1	Olympique Girou FC (6)
5.	Tarbes Pyrénées Football (4)	2–2 (5–4 p)	Blagnac FC (5)
6.	AS Mondonville (9)	2–4	Saint-Alban Aucamville FC (7)
7.	Balma SC (5)	0–0 (4–3 p)	FC Lourdais XI (6)
8.	Stade St Affricain (8)	0–1	Pradines-St Vincent-Douelle-Mercuès Olt (6)
9.	Luc Primaube FC (6)	0–2	Rodez AF (3)
10.	FC L'Isle-Jourdain (9)	1–2	Luzenac AP (5)
11.	FC Marssac-Rivières-Senouillac Rives du Tarn (8)	1–2 (a.e.t.)	Montauban FCTG (7)
12.	AS Lavernose-Lherm-Mauzac (9)	0–1	Auch Football (6)

=== Languedoc-Roussillon ===
These matches were played on 7 and 8 October 2017.

Fifth round results: Languedoc-Roussillon

Tie no	Home team (tier)	Score	Away team (tier)
1.	Olympique Alès (5)	2–0	FU Narbonne (5)
2.	RCO Agde (5)	2–2 (2–3 p)	ES Paulhan-Pézenas (4)
3.	FC Alberes Argelès (6)	2–2 (4–3 p)	AS Béziers (3)
4.	AS Fabrègues (5)	2–0	Castelnau Le Crès FC (6)
5.	SC Anduzien (7)	1–1 (3–1 p)	FC Sète 34 (4)
6.	Entente St Clément-Montferrier (6)	5–0	JS Chemin Bas d'Avignon (7)
7.	US Conques (6)	0–5	ES Pays d'Uzes (6)
8.	AS Rousson (7)	1–2	FC Bagnols Pont (6)
9.	Stade Beaucairois (6)	1–1 (3–4 p)	AS Perpignan Méditerranée (7)
10.	Arceaux Montpellier (7)	1–1 (2–4 p)	Canet Roussillon FC (5)

== Sixth round ==
=== Midi-Pyrénées ===
These matches were played on 21 October 2017.

Sixth round results: Midi-Pyrénées

Tie no	Home team (tier)	Score	Away team (tier)
1.	Montauban FCTG (7)	1–1 (4–2 p)	Pradines-St Vincent-Douelle-Mercuès Olt (6)
2.	Saint-Alban Aucamville FC (7)	0–3	Tarbes Pyrénées Football (4)
3.	AS Tournefeuille (7)	4–3	Luzenac AP (5)
4.	Balma SC (5)	5–0	AS Fleurance-La Sauvetat (6)
5.	Auch Football (6)	2–4	US Colomiers Football (4)
6.	Toulouse Rodéo FC (5)	0–1	Rodez AF (3)

=== Languedoc-Roussillon ===
These matches were played on 21 and 22 October 2017.

Sixth round results: Languedoc-Roussillon

Tie no	Home team (tier)	Score	Away team (tier)
1.	ES Pays d'Uzes (6)	0–2	AS Fabrègues (5)
2.	AS Perpignan Méditerranée (7)	1–2	Canet Roussillon FC (5)
3.	FC Alberes Argelès (6)	2–1	ES Paulhan-Pézenas (4)
4.	FC Bagnols Pont (6)	0–1	Olympique Alès (5)
5.	SC Anduzien (7)	3–1	Entente St Clément-Montferrier (6)
