= 2018–19 Coupe de France preliminary rounds, Occitanie =

Football results

The 2018–19 Coupe de France preliminary rounds, Occitanie was the qualifying competition to decide which teams from the leagues of the Occitanie region of France took part in the main competition from the seventh round.

== First round ==
The first round is organised by individual districts..

These matches are from the Ariège district, and were played on 25 and 26 August 2018.

First round results: Occitanie (Ariège)
| Tie no | Home team (tier) | Score | Away team (tier) |
|---|---|---|---|
| 1. | FC Mirepoix (9) | 3–2 (a.e.t.) | FC Pays d'Olmes (9) |
| 2. | Tarascon FC (9) | 4–0 | US Montaut (9) |
| 3. | FC Coussa-Hers (9) | 2–2 (3–4 p) | ES St Jean-du-Falga (9) |
| 4. | Vernajoul AC (10) | 0–3 | FC St Girons (9) |
| 5. | Un Jeune Avenir (9) | 0–3 (Note: Tie won by forfeit.) | EN Mazères (9) |
| 6. | AS Rieux-de-Pelleport (9) | 2–3 | FC Saverdun (8) |
| 7. | FC Laroque d'Olmes (10) | 3–0 | FC Caumont (10) |

These matches are from the Aveyron district, and were played on 24, 25 and 26 August 2018.

First round results: Occitanie (Aveyron)
| Tie no | Home team (tier) | Score | Away team (tier) |
|---|---|---|---|
| 1. | FC Agen-Gages (10) | 1–3 | Espoir FC 88 (8) |
| 2. | US Montbazens (10) | 3–1 | AS Aguessac (9) |
| 3. | Association St Laurentaise Cantonale Canourguaise (10) | 4–1 (a.e.t.) | JS Lévézou (9) |
| 4. | AO Bozouls (11) | 0–4 | Entente Salles Curan/Curan (9) |
| 5. | AS Vabraise (10) | 3–3 (3–5 p) | Vallée du Lot Capdenac (9) |
| 6. | US Pays Alzuréen (9) | 0–3 | FC Naucellois (9) |
| 7. | FC Villeneuvois/Diège (9) | 0–3 | FC Sources de l'Aveyron (9) |
| 8. | Entente Campuac-Golinhac-Espeyrac (10) | 1–5 | Entente St Georges/St Rome (8) |
| 9. | US Argence/Viadène (10) | 1–0 | AS Olemps (8) |
| 10. | Foot Rouergue (11) | 1–4 | SO Millau (8) |
| 11. | Inter de Causse Bezonnes (11) | 0–3 | US Réquistanaise (9) |
| 12. | Entente Costecalde Lestrade Broquiès (10) | 4–1 | Foot Vallon (9) |
| 13. | Union Haut Lévézou (11) | 0–3 | US Bas Rouergue (9) |
| 14. | AS St Geniez-d'Olt (11) | 1–5 | US Espalion (8) |
| 15. | AS Belmontaise (14) | 1–3 (a.e.t.) | US Pays Rignacoise (9) |
| 16. | Pareloup Céor FC (12) | 2–6 | FC Monastère (8) |

These matches are from the Gers district, and were played on 24, 25, 26 and 29 August 2018.

First round results: Occitanie (Gers)
| Tie no | Home team (tier) | Score | Away team (tier) |
|---|---|---|---|
| 1. | FC Vallée de l'Arrats (9) | 1–0 | JS Tougetoise (9) |
| 2. | UA Vic-Fezensac (9) | 1–0 | FC Mirandais (10) |
| 3. | AS Manciet (10) | 2–1 | Eauze FC (9) |
| 4. | SC Solomiacais (10) | 0–1 | ES Cologne-Sarrant (10) |
| 5. | US Simorraine (9) | 6–1 | US Lectoure (10) |
| 6. | US Duran (9) | 1–3 | SC St Clar (9) |
| 7. | VVA Labéjan (10) | 4–7 (a.e.t.) | US Aignanaise (9) |

These matches are from the Lot district, and were played on 17, 18 and 19 August 2018.

First round results: Occitanie (Lot)
| Tie no | Home team (tier) | Score | Away team (tier) |
|---|---|---|---|
| 1. | Figeac Quercy (8) | 2–1 (a.e.t.) | AS Causse Limargue (8) |
| 2. | Bouriane FC (9) | 0–2 | ES Souillac-Cressenac-Gignac (10) |
| 3. | FC Haut Quercy (9) | 1–5 | Élan Marivalois (9) |
| 4. | Val Roc Foot (8) | 3–1 | Haut Célé FC (9) |
| 5. | FC Quercy Blanc (9) | 0–1 | Puy-l'Évêque-Prayssac FC (9) |
| 6. | FF Mauroux (11) | 0–6 | FC Lalbenque-Fontanes (9) |
| 7. | FC Biars-Bretenoux (8) | 4–0 | AS Montcabrier (9) |
| 8. | CL Cuzance (11) | 0–4 | Entente Cajarc Cenevières (10) |
| 9. | La Fortunière FC (9) | 0–3 | Entente Ségala (9) |

These matches are from the Hautes-Pyrénées district, and were played on 24, 25 and 26 August 2018.

First round results: Occitanie (Hautes-Pyrénées)
| Tie no | Home team (tier) | Score | Away team (tier) |
|---|---|---|---|
| 1. | ASC Aureilhan (8) | 3–0 | FC des Nestes (9) |
| 2. | Elan Pyrénéen Bazet-Bordères-Lagarde (9) | 9–0 | SC Sarrancolinois (10) |
| 3. | Séméac OFC (8) | 2–0 | ASC Barbazan-Debat (9) |
| 4. | Galan FC (10) | 2–5 | FC Val d'Adour (9) |
| 5. | US Marquisat Bénac (9) | 0–1 | Boutons d'Or Ger (9) |
| 6. | FC Pyrénées/Vallées des Gaves (8) | 1–1 (3–4 p) | Soues Cigognes FC (9) |
| 7. | Tarbes FC (10) | 2–1 | FC Plateau (9) |
| 8. | ES Guizerix-Puntous (11) | 0–9 | Horgues-Odos FC (10) |

These matches are from the Tarn district, and were played on 25 and 26 August 2018.

First round results: Occitanie (Tarn)
| Tie no | Home team (tier) | Score | Away team (tier) |
|---|---|---|---|
| 1. | Réalmont FC (10) | 0–2 | FC Graulhet (8) |
| 2. | US Carmaux (9) | 3–2 (a.e.t.) | US Autan (9) |
| 3. | ASPTT Albi (9) | 0–4 | AS Giroussens (9) |
| 4. | AS Briatexte (10) | 1–2 | FC Castelnau-de-Lévis (9) |
| 5. | US Labruguièroise (9) | 0–4 | Terrsac Albi FC (9) |
| 6. | Sorèze FC (10) | 2–4 | Pays d'Agoût FC (9) |
| 7. | Lavaur FC (9) | 3–1 | AS Pampelonnaise (9) |
| 8. | FC Bastidois (11) | 1–8 | FC Vignoble 81 (9) |
| 9. | AS Lagrave (11) | 1–4 | Sport Benfica Graulhet (9) |
| 10. | La Mygale-Le Séquestre (9) | 1–2 | Saïx-Sémalens FC (9) |
| 11. | RC St Benoît (11) | 1–2 | Les Copains d'Abord (8) |
| 12. | Cambounet FC (9) | 3–2 | US Gaillacois (8) |
| 13. | AS Vallée du Sor (10) | 1–7 | St Juéry OF (8) |
| 14. | Fréjairolles-Cambon-Collines (10) | 1–2 (a.e.t.) | US Castres (8) |

These matches are from the Tarn-et-Garonne district, and were played on 17, 18 and 19 August 2018.

First round results: Occitanie (Tarn-et-Garonne)
| Tie no | Home team (tier) | Score | Away team (tier) |
|---|---|---|---|
| 1. | Stade Larrazet-Garganvillar (9) | 3–2 (a.e.t.) | FC Brulhois (9) |
| 2. | Stade Caussadais (10) | 2–1 | Confluences FC (9) |
| 3. | FC Beaumontois (9) | 0–3 | Coquelicots Montéchois FC (9) |
| 4. | AS Mas-Grenier (8) | 3–3 (4–2 p) | La Nicolaite (9) |
| 5. | AS Bressols (8) | 2–1 (a.e.t.) | AS Stéphanoise (10) |
| 6. | FC Nègrepelisse-Montricoux (9) | 1–0 | JS Meauzacaise (8) |
| 7. | AC Bastidien (9) | 2–3 | FC Montpezat Puylaroque (9) |
| 8. | SC Lafrancaisain (9) | 0–3 | FCUS Molières (9) |

These matches are from the Haute-Garonne district, and were played on 24, 25 and 26 August 2018.

First round results: Occitanie (Haute-Garonne)
| Tie no | Home team (tier) | Score | Away team (tier) |
|---|---|---|---|
| 1. | FC Mabroc (9) | 5–0 | US Bagnères Luchon Sports/Cierp-Gaud/Marignac (10) |
| 2. | Entente Boulogne-Péguilhan (8) | 2–1 | FC Beauzelle (8) |
| 3. | Confluent/Lacroix/Saubens/Pinsaguel (11) | 5–0 | Gardouch OC (12) |
| 4. | Lauragais FC (9) | 2–3 | AO Cornebarrieu (10) |
| 5. | AS Villeneuve Lécussan (10) | 0–1 | FC Eaunes/Labarthe-sur-Lèze (8) |
| 6. | Lagardelle Miremont Sports (11) | 1–5 | AS Mondonville (9) |
| 7. | SA Auterive (13) | 1–8 | Toulouse Olympique Aviation Club (9) |
| 8. | Villeneuve FC (9) | 2–4 | Montastruc-de-Salies FC (10) |
| 9. | AS Longages (12) | 0–7 | ERCSO L'Isle-en-Dodon (8) |
| 10. | AS Toulouse Lardenne (11) | 2–0 (a.e.t.) | Pyrénées Sud Comminges (9) |
| 11. | Toulouse Rangueil FC (9) | 4–5 (a.e.t.) | JE Toulousaine Croix-Daurade (10) |
| 12. | Toulouse ACF (9) | 1–0 | FC Launaguet (8) |
| 13. | EF Castelmaurou Verfeil (10) | 7–1 | FC Roquetois (11) |
| 14. | Bruguières SC (10) | 7–0 | AS Toulouse Mirail (9) |
| 15. | ESEF St Jory (11) | 3–1 | Entente Landorthe-Labarthe-Estancarbon-Savarthès (10) |
| 16. | AS Planéenne (12) | 1–4 | US Riveraine (11) |
| 17. | Toulouse Foot Compans Caffarelli (11) | 2–5 | FC Mahorais Toulouse (12) |
| 18. | Toulouse Football Sud (13) | 2–3 | US Léguevin (9) |
| 19. | AS Villemur (11) | 5–0 | JS Cugnaux (8) |
| 20. | Juventus de Papus (8) | 2–1 | AS Castelnau-d'Estrétefonds (8) |
| 21. | US Bagatelle (13) | 0–3 (Note: Tie won by forfeit.) | UE Bossòst (10) |
| 22. | FC Venerque-Le Vernet (11) | 4–3 | US Ramonville (9) |
| 23. | Inter FC (9) | 1–0 | US Auriacaise (10) |

These matches are from the Aude district, and were played on 26 August 2018.

First round results: Occitanie (Aude)
| Tie no | Home team (tier) | Score | Away team (tier) |
|---|---|---|---|
| 1. | FC Corbières Méditerranée (10) | 5–0 | FC Alaric-Puichéric (9) |
| 2. | Olympic Cuxac-d'Aude (10) | 3–2 | Entente Naurouze-Labastide (9) |
| 3. | Razès Olympique (9) | 3–2 | MJC Gruissan (7) |
| 4. | Olympique Moussan-Montredon (9) | 0–3 | Trapel-Pennautier FC (9) |
| 5. | US Montagne Noire (9) | 1–5 | Trèbes FC (7) |
| 6. | FC Malepère (11) | 0–3 | USA Pezens (8) |
| 7. | FC St Nazairois (10) | 2–5 | Haut-Minervois Olympique (9) |
| 8. | FC Chalabre (10) | 3–1 | FC Vallée du Lauquet (10) |
| 9. | US Villasavary (12) | 0–2 | AS Bram (10) |
| 10. | AJS Bages (12) | 2–1 | Omnisport St Papoul (10) |
| 11. | ES Fanjeaux-La Piège (10) | 0–4 | Limoux-Pieusse FC (9) |
| 12. | FC Villegly (10) | 1–7 | CO Castelnaudary (7) |
| 13. | US Minervois (8) | 3–5 | UFC Narbonne (9) |
| 14. | FC Caux-et-Sauzens (10) | 0–3 | FC Briolet (8) |
| 15. | FC Villedubert (10) | 1–3 (a.e.t.) | ES Ste Eulalie-Villesèquelande (8) |
| 16. | AS Ventenac (11) | 0–3 | UF Lézignanais (8) |

These matches are from the Gard-Lozère district, and were played on 26 August 2018.

First round results: Occitanie (Gard-Lozère)
| Tie no | Home team (tier) | Score | Away team (tier) |
|---|---|---|---|
| 1. | FC Grandrieu-Rocles (12) | 2–4 (a.e.t.) | AS Le Malzieu (12) |
| 2. | AS Vaunage (10) | 2–3 | GC Gallarguois (10) |
| 3. | ES Rochefort Signargues (11) | 0–0 (4–5 p) | FC Canabier (9) |
| 4. | ES Barjacoise (11) | 0–3 | FC Val de Cèze (9) |
| 5. | RC St Laurent-des-Arbres (11) | 0–3 | FC Pont-St-Esprit (10) |
| 6. | EFC Beaucairois (11) | 2–1 | AS Poulx (10) |
| 7. | AS Nîmes Camarguais Croix de Fer (12) | 0–10 | SC Nîmois (11) |
| 8. | ES Marguerittes (10) | 4–3 | OC Redessan (9) |
| 9. | Remoulins FC (11) | 2–3 | ES Trois Moulins (9) |
| 10. | ES Grau-du-Roi (10) | 1–4 | FC Vauverdois (9) |
| 11. | AS Sommières (11) | 2–3 (a.e.t.) | FC Langlade (10) |
| 12. | FC St Jeannais (12) | 0–3 | FC Cruviers-Lascours (10) |
| 13. | Entente Nasbinals Fournels (12) | 2–1 | Vaillante Aumonaise (11) |
| 14. | Entente Chirac-Le Monastier (12) | 2–1 (a.e.t.) | Valdonnez FC (11) |
| 15. | AS Badaroux (11) | 3–1 | Football Sud Lozère (10) |
| 16. | Marvejols Sports (11) | 2–0 | ESC Le Buisson (10) |
| 17. | Besseges-St Ambroix FC (11) | 5–2 | AS Cendras (11) |
| 18. | FC La Calmette (11) | 1–3 | Stade Ste Barbe (10) |
| 19. | AS Le Collet-de-Dèze (12) | 0–6 | AS St Christol-lès-Alès (10) |
| 20. | US La Regordane (11) | 1–7 | Omnisports St Hilaire-La Jasse (10) |
| 21. | US Garons (11) | 0–1 | SC Manduellois (10) |

These matches are from the Hérault district, and were played on 25 and 26 August 2018.

First round results: Occitanie (Hérault)
| Tie no | Home team (tier) | Score | Away team (tier) |
|---|---|---|---|
| 1. | Jacou Clapiers FA (10) | 9–0 | US Basses-Cévennes (11) |
| 2. | FC Villeneuve-lès-Béziers (12) | 1–5 | US Mauguio Carnon (9) |
| 3. | RS Gigeannais (11) | 1–3 | FC Lespignan-Vendres (9) |
| 4. | AS Gignacois (8) | 3–0 (Note: Tie won by forfeit.) | FC Pradéen (10) |
| 5. | Sète OFC (11) | 3–1 | ES Coeur Hérault (11) |
| 6. | AS St Gilloise (9) | 4–1 | Olympique Midi Lirou Capestang-Poilhes (11) |
| 7. | US Pougetoise (11) | 1–7 | AS Atlas Paillade (9) |
| 8. | FC Aspiranais (12) | 1–5 | Entente Corneilhan-Lignan (9) |
| 9. | Arsenal Croix d'Argent FC (?) | 3–0 | Crabe Sportif Marseillan (10) |
| 10. | AS St Mathieu-de-Tréviers (10) | 1–5 | AS Puissalicon-Magalas (9) |
| 11. | FC Lavérune (10) | 0–2 | FC Petit Bard (8) |
| 12. | US Villeveyracoise (11) | 0–3 | US Montagnacoise (8) |
| 13. | ASPTT Lunel (11) | 3–0 | FC Thongue et Libron (11) |
| 14. | AS Puimisson | 2–4 | RSO Cournonterral (11) |
| 15. | Stade Montblanais Foot (11) | 3–1 | AS Mireval (11) |
| 16. | USO Florensac-Pinet (10) | 3–0 | AS St Martin Montpellier (11) |
| 17. | AS Valerguoise (11) | 1–2 | RC Lemasson (12) |
| 18. | US Lunel-Vielloise (10) | 3–0 | RC St Georges-d'Orques (11) |
| 19. | Pompignane SC (12) | 0–3 | FC Sussargues-Berange (10) |
| 20. | Avenir Castriote (12) | 2–3 | FCO Valras-Serignan (10) |
| 21. | ES Sète (11) | 2–1 (a.e.t.) | AS Juvignac (10) |
| 22. | FC Neffies (13) | 1–3 | CA Poussan (10) |
| 23. | AS Canétoise (10) | 3–5 | FO Sud Hérault (10) |
| 24. | AC Alignanais (10) | 5–0 | FC Montpeyroux (13) |
| 25. | Pointe Courte AC Sète (10) | 4–3 | RC Vedasien (9) |
| 26. | Olympique La Peyrade FC (9) | 10–0 | ASPTT Montpellier (12) |

These matches are from the Pyrénées-Orientales district, and were played on 25 and 26 August 2018.

First round results: Occitanie (Pyrénées-Orientales)
| Tie no | Home team (tier) | Score | Away team (tier) |
|---|---|---|---|
| 1. | Elne FC (8) | 3–4 | Cabestany OC (8) |
| 2. | FC St Cyprien (9) | 3–0 (Note: Tie won by forfeit.) | AS Prades (?) |
| 3. | Association Théza Alénya Corneilla FC (9) | 2–2 (3–2 p) | AS Perpignan Méditerranée (7) |
| 4. | Saleilles OC (10) | 3–4 | Baho-Pézilla FC (10) |
| 5. | Perpignan FC Bas-Vernet (7) | 3–2 | FC Laurentin (8) |
| 6. | Céret FC (10) | 0–1 | BECE FC Vallée de l'Aigly (8) |
| 7. | Les Amis de Cédric Brunier (11) | 0–0 (0–1 p) | US Bompas (9) |

== Second round ==
The second round is organised by individual districts.

These matches are from the Ariège district, and were played on 1 September 2018.

Second round results: Occitanie (Ariège)
| Tie no | Home team (tier) | Score | Away team (tier) |
|---|---|---|---|
| 1. | FC Mirepoix (9) | 2–0 | FC Laroque d'Olmes (10) |
| 2. | FC Foix (7) | 3–1 | FC Pamiers (7) |
| 3. | FC St Girons (9) | 2–1 (a.e.t.) | Tarascon FC (9) |
| 4. | EN Mazères (9) | 1–3 | ES Fossatoise (8) |
| 5. | FC Saverdun (8) | 1–2 | ES St Jean-du-Falga (9) |

These matches are from the Aveyron district, and were played on 31 August and 1 and 2 September 2018.

Second round results: Occitanie (Aveyron)
| Tie no | Home team (tier) | Score | Away team (tier) |
|---|---|---|---|
| 1. | Association St Laurentaise Cantonale Canourguaise (10) | 4–1 | Entente Costecalde Lestrade Broquiès (10) |
| 2. | US Argence/Viadène (10) | 2–4 | SC Sébazac (8) |
| 3. | FC Naucellois (9) | 2–1 (a.e.t.) | Entente Salles Curan/Curan (9) |
| 4. | Entente St Georges/St Rome (8) | 2–3 (a.e.t.) | Ségala-Rieupeyroux-Salvetat (8) |
| 5. | Vallée du Lot Capdenac (9) | 2–3 | US Bas Rouergue (9) |
| 6. | FC Monastère (8) | 2–1 | Espoir FC 88 (8) |
| 7. | US Espalion (8) | 0–3 | Stade St Affricain (8) |
| 8. | SO Millau (8) | 4–2 (a.e.t.) | Stade Villefranchois (8) |
| 9. | US Réquistanaise (9) | 1–1 (1–3 p) | Druelle FC (7) |
| 10. | FC Sources de l'Aveyron (9) | 1–0 | US Montbazens (10) |
| 11. | US Pays Rignacoise (9) | 0–1 | JS Bassin Aveyron (8) |

These matches are from the Gers district, and were played on 31 August and 1 September 2018.

Second round results: Occitanie (Gers)
| Tie no | Home team (tier) | Score | Away team (tier) |
|---|---|---|---|
| 1. | UA Vic-Fezensac (9) | 2–0 | Sud Astarac 2010 (8) |
| 2. | SC St Clar (9) | 1–4 | FC L'Isle-Jourdain (8) |
| 3. | ES Cologne-Sarrant (10) | 2–0 | Ste Christie-Preignan AS (8) |
| 4. | FC Pavien (8) | 5–1 | US Simorraine (9) |
| 5. | AS Manciet (10) | 2–3 | FC Vallée de l'Arrats (9) |
| 6. | ES Gimontoise (8) | 3–0 | US Aignanaise (9) |

These matches are from the Lot district, and were played on 24, 25 and 26 August 2018.

Second round results: Occitanie (Lot)
| Tie no | Home team (tier) | Score | Away team (tier) |
|---|---|---|---|
| 1. | Entente Cajarc Cenevières (10) | 0–1 | FC Biars-Bretenoux (8) |
| 2. | Puy-l'Évêque-Prayssac FC (9) | 0–0 (7–6 p) | Élan Marivalois (9) |
| 3. | FC Lalbenque-Fontanes (9) | 0–1 | Figeac Quercy (8) |
| 4. | Entente Ségala (9) | 1–0 | Cahors FC (7) |
| 5. | ES Souillac-Cressenac-Gignac (10) | 0–3 | Val Roc Foot (8) |

These matches are from the Hautes-Pyrénées district, and were played on 31 August and 1 September 2018.

Second round results: Occitanie (Hautes-Pyrénées)
| Tie no | Home team (tier) | Score | Away team (tier) |
|---|---|---|---|
| 1. | Soues Cigognes FC (9) | 1–0 | Tarbes FC (10) |
| 2. | Horgues-Odos FC (10) | 1–4 | ASC Aureilhan (8) |
| 3. | Séméac OFC (8) | 1–2 (a.e.t.) | Juillan OS (7) |
| 4. | ES Haut Adour (8) | 0–2 | Elan Pyrénéen Bazet-Bordères-Lagarde (9) |
| 5. | UST Nouvelles Vauge (8) | 4–0 | FC Val d'Adour (9) |
| 6. | Boutons d'Or Ger (9) | 1–1 (1–3 p) | Quand Même Orleix (8) |

These matches are from the Tarn district, and were played on 1 and 2 September 2018.

Second round results: Occitanie (Tarn)
| Tie no | Home team (tier) | Score | Away team (tier) |
|---|---|---|---|
| 1. | FC Vignoble 81 (9) | 0–3 (Note: Match abandoned, with the scoreline 1–4, due to floodlight failure. FC Vignoble penalised, US Castres qualify.) | US Castres (8) |
| 2. | Lavaur FC (9) | 0–1 | St Juéry OF (8) |
| 3. | Pays d'Agoût FC (9) | 1–2 | Cambounet FC (9) |
| 4. | Saïx-Sémalens FC (9) | 2–4 (a.e.t.) | FC Marssac-Rivières-Senouillac Rives du Tarn (7) |
| 5. | FC Castelnau-de-Lévis (9) | 2–0 | Terrsac Albi FC (9) |
| 6. | FC Graulhet (8) | 2–2 (4–3 p) | FC Pays Mazamétain (7) |
| 7. | Sport Benfica Graulhet (9) | 1–5 | Les Copains d'Abord (8) |
| 8. | US Carmaux (9) | 1–4 | US St Sulpice (8) |
| 9. | Olympique Lautrec (8) | 0–1 | AS Giroussens (9) |

These matches are from the Tarn-et-Garonne district, and were played on 25 and 26 August 2018.

Second round results: Occitanie (Tarn-et-Garonne)
| Tie no | Home team (tier) | Score | Away team (tier) |
|---|---|---|---|
| 1. | FC Montpezat Puylaroque (9) | 1–3 | Montauban FCTG (7) |
| 2. | Cazes Olympique (7) | 3–4 | AS Bressols (8) |
| 3. | Stade Caussadais (10) | 3–0 | Stade Larrazet-Garganvillar (9) |
| 4. | FCUS Molières (9) | 1–4 | AA Grisolles (7) |
| 5. | AS Mas-Grenier (8) | 0–1 | FC Nègrepelisse-Montricoux (9) |
| 6. | Avenir Lavitois (8) | 2–3 | Coquelicots Montéchois FC (9) |

These matches are from the Haute-Garonne district, and were played on 31 August and 1 and 2 September 2018.

Second round results: Occitanie (Haute-Garonne)
| Tie no | Home team (tier) | Score | Away team (tier) |
|---|---|---|---|
| 1. | Toulouse Olympique Aviation Club (9) | 1–3 | St Orens FC (7) |
| 2. | Comminges St Gaudens (8) | 3–1 | ERCSO L'Isle-en-Dodon (8) |
| 3. | Inter FC (9) | 5–2 | Toulouse ACF (9) |
| 4. | AO Cornebarrieu (10) | 1–3 | JS Toulouse Pradettes (8) |
| 5. | UE Bossòst (10) | 1–4 | Saint-Alban Aucamville FC (7) |
| 6. | Confluent/Lacroix/Saubens/Pinsaguel (11) | 2–3 | Entente Boulogne-Péguilhan (8) |
| 7. | US Léguevin (9) | 0–3 | Bruguières SC (10) |
| 8. | JS Cintegabelle (8) | 1–2 | Juventus de Papus (8) |
| 9. | Baziège OC (7) | 2–3 | US Seysses-Frouzins (7) |
| 10. | US Plaisance (8) | 6–1 | US Castelginest (8) |
| 11. | AS Toulouse Lardenne (11) | 0–3 | US Revel (7) |
| 12. | US Salies-du-Salat/Mane/St Martory (8) | 2–0 | FC Eaunes/Labarthe-sur-Lèze (8) |
| 13. | EFC Aurignac (8) | 2–3 | US Pouvourville (8) |
| 14. | US Riveraine (11) | 1–2 | AS Mondonville (9) |
| 15. | FC Mabroc (9) | 2–1 | JS Carbonne (8) |
| 16. | EF Castelmaurou Verfeil (10) | 3–4 | AS Lavernose-Lherm-Mauzac (8) |
| 17. | ES St Simon (7) | 4–1 | UA Fenouillet (8) |
| 18. | ESEF St Jory (11) | 2–5 | FC Mahorais Toulouse (12) |
| 19. | AS Villemur (11) | 4–0 | US Encausse-Soueich-Ganties (8) |
| 20. | JE Toulousaine Croix-Daurade (10) | 2–1 | Avenir Fonsorbais (8) |
| 21. | FC Venerque-Le Vernet (11) | 1–2 (a.e.t.) | Montastruc-de-Salies FC (10) |

These matches are from the Aude district, and were played on 2 September 2018.

Second round results: Occitanie (Aude) (Note: First round winners FC Corbières Méditerranée and UF Lézignanais received byes to the third round.)
| Tie no | Home team (tier) | Score | Away team (tier) |
|---|---|---|---|
| 1. | FC Chalabre (10) | 0–5 | FC Briolet (8) |
| 2. | Trapel-Pennautier FC (9) | 1–2 | USA Pezens (8) |
| 3. | ES Ste Eulalie-Villesèquelande (8) | 3–1 (a.e.t.) | Haut-Minervois Olympique (9) |
| 4. | UFC Narbonne (9) | 3–0 | AS Bram (10) |
| 5. | Razès Olympique (9) | 0–4 | Trèbes FC (7) |
| 6. | Limoux-Pieusse FC (9) | 0–1 | CO Castelnaudary (7) |
| 7. | AJS Bages (12) | 1–5 | Olympic Cuxac-d'Aude (10) |

These matches are from the Gard-Lozère district, and were played on 31 August and 1 and 2 September 2018.

Second round results: Occitanie (Gard-Lozère)
| Tie no | Home team (tier) | Score | Away team (tier) |
|---|---|---|---|
| 1. | Besseges-St Ambroix FC (11) | 2–0 | AS Badaroux (11) |
| 2. | Entente Nasbinals Fournels (12) | 0–1 | Marvejols Sports (11) |
| 3. | FC Langlade (10) | 0–1 (a.e.t.) | CO Soleil Levant Nîmes (7) |
| 4. | SC Manduellois (10) | 0–3 | JS Chemin Bas d'Avignon (7) |
| 5. | GC Gallarguois (10) | 0–1 | SO Aimargues (7) |
| 6. | FC Vauverdois (9) | 5–1 | Olympique Saintois (9) |
| 7. | EFC Beaucairois (11) | 0–2 | AEC St Gilles (8) |
| 8. | SC Nîmois (11) | 6–1 | AS Caissargues (9) |
| 9. | ES Marguerittes (10) | 3–2 | GS Gardois (9) |
| 10. | FC Val de Cèze (9) | 4–3 | FC Chusclan-Laudun-l'Ardoise (8) |
| 11. | Stade Ste Barbe (10) | 1–2 | US Trèfle (8) |
| 12. | RC Générac (9) | 2–3 (a.e.t.) | Entente Perrier Vergèze (7) |
| 13. | FC Pont-St-Esprit (10) | 3–1 | FC Canabier (9) |
| 14. | AS Le Malzieu (12) | 0–2 | Entente Chirac-Le Monastier (12) |
| 15. | FC Cruviers-Lascours (10) | 3–1 | US Monoblet (9) |
| 16. | AS St Christol-lès-Alès (10) | 0–4 | AS St Privat-des-Vieux (8) |
| 17. | Omnisports St Hilaire-La Jasse (10) | 1–4 (a.e.t.) | SC Anduzien (7) |
| 18. | ES Trois Moulins (9) | 0–4 | AS Nîmes Athletic (8) |

These matches are from the Hérault district, and were played on 2 September 2018.

Second round results: Occitanie (Hérault)
| Tie no | Home team (tier) | Score | Away team (tier) |
|---|---|---|---|
| 1. | Olympique St-André-de-Sangonis (8) | 7–0 | ASPTT Lunel (11) |
| 2. | Baillargues-St Brès-Valergues (8) | 1–1 (2–3 p) | AS Atlas Paillade (9) |
| 3. | Mèze Stade FC (8) | 5–3 (a.e.t.) | Arsenal Croix d'Argent FC (?) |
| 4. | USO Florensac-Pinet (10) | 4–2 | FCO Valras-Serignan (10) |
| 5. | US Mauguio Carnon (9) | 3–0 | AS St Gilloise (9) |
| 6. | AS Pignan (7) | 5–0 | AS Puissalicon-Magalas (9) |
| 7. | ES Pérols (8) | 6–0 | Stade Montblanais Foot (11) |
| 8. | AS Montarnaud-St Paul-Vaihauques-Murviel (7) | 2–1 | ES Paulhan-Pézenas (9) |
| 9. | CA Poussan (10) | 2–1 | AS Gignacois (8) |
| 10. | Pointe Courte AC Sète (10) | 2–1 (a.e.t.) | ES Sète (11) |
| 11. | CE Palavas (7) | 1–4 | GC Lunel (7) |
| 12. | FC Petit Bard (8) | 2–0 | RC Lemasson (12) |
| 13. | RSO Cournonterral (11) | 1–0 | FC Lespignan-Vendres (9) |
| 14. | US Lunel-Vielloise (10) | 0–3 | Entente Corneilhan-Lignan (9) |
| 15. | FO Sud Hérault (10) | 2–0 | PI Vendargues (7) |
| 16. | SC Cers-Portiragnes (7) | 5–0 | FC Sussargues-Berange (10) |
| 17. | Stade Balarucois (7) | 4–0 | Sète OFC (11) |
| 18. | AC Alignanais (10) | 4–3 (a.e.t.) | US Montagnacoise (8) |
| 19. | Jacou Clapiers FA (10) | 4–0 | Arceaux Montpellier (7) |
| 20. | Olympique La Peyrade FC (9) | 1–2 | US Béziers (7) |

These matches are from the Pyrénées-Orientales district, and were played on 2 September 2018.

Second round results: Occitanie (Pyrénées-Orientales)
| Tie no | Home team (tier) | Score | Away team (tier) |
|---|---|---|---|
| 1. | FC Thuirinois (9) | 1–2 | Cabestany OC (8) |
| 2. | Baho-Pézilla FC (10) | 5–0 | US Bompas (9) |
| 3. | Le Boulou-St Jean-Pla-de-Courts FC (9) | 1–3 | Perpignan FC Bas-Vernet (7) |
| 4. | SO Rivesaltais (9) | 0–3 | Sporting Perpignan Nord (7) |
| 5. | Salanca FC (9) | 0–1 | BECE FC Vallée de l'Aigly (8) |
| 6. | FC Cerdagne-Font-Romeu-Capcir (10) | 1–6 | Association Théza Alénya Corneilla FC (9) |
| 7. | FC Le Soler (9) | 3–0 | FC St Cyprien (9) |

== Third round ==
These matches were played on 15 and 16 September 2018.

Third round results: Occitanie
| Tie no | Home team (tier) | Score | Away team (tier) |
|---|---|---|---|
| 1. | FC Mirepoix (9) | 3–0 | UST Nouvelles Vauge (8) |
| 2. | Marvejols Sports (11) | 0–1 | Entente Perrier Vergèze (7) |
| 3. | Association St Laurentaise Cantonale Canourguaise (10) | 0–3 | Blagnac FC (5) |
| 4. | Saint-Alban Aucamville FC (7) | 0–3 | US Albi (6) |
| 5. | US Revel (7) | 2–3 | AS Muret (5) |
| 6. | Montauban FCTG (7) | 4–0 | Olympique Girou FC (6) |
| 7. | FC Biars-Bretenoux (8) | 2–0 | FC Graulhet (8) |
| 8. | Toulouse Métropole FC (6) | 1–0 | FC Lourdais XI (6) |
| 9. | Stade St Affricain (8) | 1–0 | FC Marssac-Rivières-Senouillac Rives du Tarn (7) |
| 10. | UA Vic-Fezensac (9) | 2–4 | FC Foix (7) |
| 11. | Auch Football (6) | 3–0 | US Cazères (6) |
| 12. | FC Sources de l'Aveyron (9) | 1–4 | Druelle FC (7) |
| 13. | Figeac Quercy (8) | 0–2 | FA Carcassonne (6) |
| 14. | AS Giroussens (9) | 1–2 | Ségala-Rieupeyroux-Salvetat (8) |
| 15. | SO Millau (8) | 0–4 | Pradines-St Vincent-Douelle-Mercuès Olt (6) |
| 16. | St Juéry OF (8) | 3–2 (a.e.t.) | AS Portet-Carrefour-Récébédou (6) |
| 17. | Les Copains d'Abord (8) | 5–0 | AA Grisolles (7) |
| 18. | Sporting Perpignan Nord (7) | 0–1 | FC St Estève (6) |
| 19. | Stade Caussadais (10) | 2–5 | AS Bressols (8) |
| 20. | ES Gimontoise (8) | 0–1 | US Plaisance (8) |
| 21. | JS Toulouse Pradettes (8) | 1–0 | Juillan OS (7) |
| 22. | Comminges St Gaudens (8) | 1–6 | US Seysses-Frouzins (7) |
| 23. | US St Sulpice (8) | 3–2 (a.e.t.) | Étoile Aussonnaise (6) |
| 24. | FC Naucellois (9) | 3–2 | FC Monastère (8) |
| 25. | US Bas Rouergue (9) | 0–6 | Balma SC (5) |
| 26. | ES St Jean-du-Falga (9) | 1–4 | Luzenac AP (6) |
| 27. | US Salies-du-Salat/Mane/St Martory (8) | 1–2 | Tarbes Pyrénées Football (5) |
| 28. | AS Lavernose-Lherm-Mauzac (8) | 1–2 | Juventus de Papus (8) |
| 29. | FC L'Isle-Jourdain (8) | 0–2 | AS Tournefeuille (6) |
| 30. | FC Pavien (8) | 2–1 | US Pouvourville (8) |
| 31. | FC Vallée de l'Arrats (9) | 1–6 | Entente Golfech-St Paul-d'Espis (6) |
| 32. | ASC Aureilhan (8) | 0–4 | US Pibrac (6) |
| 33. | JE Toulousaine Croix-Daurade (10) | 2–2 (a.e.t.) | Union St Jean FC (6) |
| 34. | ES Cologne-Sarrant (10) | 0–4 | FC St Girons (9) |
| 35. | FC Mahorais Toulouse (12) | 5–5 (4–5 p) | ES St Simon (7) |
| 36. | Montastruc-de-Salies FC (10) | 0–2 | Quand Même Orleix (8) |
| 37. | FC Mabroc (9) | 0–3 | AS Fleurance-La Sauvetat (6) |
| 38. | Soues Cigognes FC (9) | 0–0 (4–3 p) | Entente Boulogne-Péguilhan (8) |
| 39. | Olympique St-André-de-Sangonis (8) | 1–4 | ES Pays d'Uzes (6) |
| 40. | Mèze Stade FC (8) | 0–1 | Entente St Clément-Montferrier (6) |
| 41. | US Salinières Aigues Mortes (6) | 2–1 | AS Fabrègues (5) |
| 42. | ES Pérols (8) | 2–1 (a.e.t.) | Stade Balarucois (7) |
| 43. | US Mauguio Carnon (9) | 1–2 | AS Montarnaud-St Paul-Vaihauques-Murviel (7) |
| 44. | Cabestany OC (8) | 3–2 | FC Briolet (8) |
| 45. | Association Théza Alénya Corneilla FC (9) | 1–3 | US Béziers (7) |
| 46. | La Clermontaise Football (6) | 0–2 | Canet Roussillon FC (5) |
| 47. | Entente Ségala (9) | 1–6 | CO Castelnaudary (7) |
| 48. | Puy-l'Évêque-Prayssac FC (9) | 3–4 | FC Castelnau-de-Lévis (9) |
| 49. | JS Bassin Aveyron (8) | 1–7 | US Castanéenne (6) |
| 50. | SC Cers-Portiragnes (7) | 0–1 | FC Alberes Argelès (6) |
| 51. | Baho-Pézilla FC (10) | 2–1 (a.e.t.) | FC Corbières Méditerranée (10) |
| 52. | UFC Narbonne (9) | 2–6 | AS Frontignan AC (6) |
| 53. | UF Lézignanais (8) | 2–2 (7–6 p) | Perpignan FC Bas-Vernet (7) |
| 54. | Entente Corneilhan-Lignan (9) | 2–3 | OC Perpignan (6) |
| 55. | FC Le Soler (9) | 1–4 | ES Ste Eulalie-Villesèquelande (8) |
| 56. | Olympic Cuxac-d'Aude (10) | 0–4 | RCO Agde (5) |
| 57. | AC Alignanais (10) | 2–5 | AS Lattoise (6) |
| 58. | Jacou Clapiers FA (10) | 10–0 | Pointe Courte AC Sète (10) |
| 59. | AEC St Gilles (8) | 0–4 | Castelnau Le Crès FC (6) |
| 60. | Besseges-St Ambroix FC (11) | 1–4 | FC Vauverdois (9) |
| 61. | SC Nîmois (11) | 1–4 | AS Nîmes Athletic (8) |
| 62. | Entente Chirac-Le Monastier (12) | 0–5 | CO Soleil Levant Nîmes (7) |
| 63. | AS Rousson (6) | 2–0 | FC Bagnols Pont (6) |
| 64. | US Trèfle (8) | 1–3 | Olympique Alès (5) |
| 65. | Coquelicots Montéchois FC (9) | 2–1 (a.e.t.) | Val Roc Foot (8) |
| 66. | SC Sébazac (8) | 2–0 | US Conques (6) |
| 67. | Onet-le-Château (6) | 0–2 | Toulouse Rodéo FC (5) |
| 68. | FC Nègrepelisse-Montricoux (9) | 5–1 | Cambounet FC (9) |
| 69. | Bruguières SC (10) | 5–5 (4–3 p) | US Castres (8) |
| 70. | ES Marguerittes (10) | 2–1 | FC Cruviers-Lascours (10) |
| 71. | FC Val de Cèze (9) | 1–4 | SC Anduzien (7) |
| 72. | Trèbes FC (7) | 1–5 | Luc Primaube FC (6) |
| 73. | RSO Cournonterral (11) | 0–3 | AF Lozère (5) |
| 74. | USO Florensac-Pinet (10) | 0–1 (a.e.t.) | FC Petit Bard (8) |
| 75. | GC Lunel (7) | 1–0 | FU Narbonne (6) |
| 76. | CA Poussan (10) | 0–2 | FO Sud Hérault (10) |
| 77. | AS Atlas Paillade (9) | 3–1 | AS Pignan (7) |
| 78. | Elan Pyrénéen Bazet-Bordères-Lagarde (9) | 1–0 | AS Mondonville (9) |
| 79. | Inter FC (9) | 2–3 | ES Fossatoise (8) |
| 80. | AS Villemur (11) | 1–3 | St Orens FC (7) |
| 81. | AS St Privat-des-Vieux (8) | 0–5 | Stade Beaucairois (5) |
| 82. | SO Aimargues (7) | 2–3 (a.e.t.) | GC Uchaud (6) |
| 83. | FC Pont-St-Esprit (10) | 2–4 | JS Chemin Bas d'Avignon (7) |
| 84. | USA Pezens (8) | 4–5 | BECE FC Vallée de l'Aigly (8) |

== Fourth round ==
These matches were played on 29 and 30 September 2018.

Fourth round results: Occitanie
| Tie no | Home team (tier) | Score | Away team (tier) |
|---|---|---|---|
| 1. | GC Uchaud (6) | 1–0 | Entente St Clément-Montferrier (6) |
| 2. | ES Pays d'Uzes (6) | 1–3 (a.e.t.) | US Salinières Aigues Mortes (6) |
| 3. | AS Frontignan AC (6) | 0–1 | AS Rousson (6) |
| 4. | Entente Perrier Vergèze (7) | 2–3 (a.e.t.) | GC Lunel (7) |
| 5. | JS Chemin Bas d'Avignon (7) | 0–3 | FC Sète 34 (4) |
| 6. | AS Montarnaud-St Paul-Vaihauques-Murviel (7) | 0–1 | Olympique Alès (5) |
| 7. | US Béziers (7) | 1–2 (a.e.t.) | AF Lozère (5) |
| 8. | AS Nîmes Athletic (8) | 0–4 | RCO Agde (5) |
| 9. | FC Petit Bard (8) | 3–4 (a.e.t.) (Note: Tie switched with the agreement of both clubs.) | AS Atlas Paillade (9) |
| 10. | ES Pérols (8) | 4–0 | SC Anduzien (7) |
| 11. | FC Vauverdois (9) | 1–3 (a.e.t.) | CO Soleil Levant Nîmes (7) |
| 12. | ES Marguerittes (10) | 2–1 (a.e.t.) | Castelnau Le Crès FC (6) |
| 13. | FO Sud Hérault (10) | 0–2 | Stade Beaucairois (5) |
| 14. | Jacou Clapiers FA (10) | 1–3 | AS Lattoise (6) |
| 15. | FC St Estève (6) | 1–1 (4–2 p) | US Castanéenne (6) |
| 16. | US Pibrac (6) | 0–0 (7–6 p) | Balma SC (5) |
| 17. | St Orens FC (7) | 2–1 (a.e.t.) | CO Castelnaudary (7) |
| 18. | ES St Simon (7) | 1–1 (5–4 p) | UF Lézignanais (8) |
| 19. | ES Ste Eulalie-Villesèquelande (8) | 3–1 (a.e.t.) | Juventus de Papus (8) |
| 20. | BECE FC Vallée de l'Aigly (8) | 0–2 | FC Alberes Argelès (6) |
| 21. | Cabestany OC (8) | 0–5 (a.e.t.) | FA Carcassonne (6) |
| 22. | JS Toulouse Pradettes (8) | 1–3 | Toulouse Métropole FC (6) |
| 23. | FC Foix (7) | 0–1 | ES Fossatoise (8) |
| 24. | US Plaisance (8) | 2–1 | OC Perpignan (6) |
| 25. | US St Sulpice (8) | 0–5 | Canet Roussillon FC (5) |
| 26. | FC Mirepoix (9) | 1–3 | Luzenac AP (6) |
| 27. | Baho-Pézilla FC (10) | 0–10 | US Colomiers Football (4) |
| 28. | Bruguières SC (10) | 0–7 | AS Muret (5) |
| 29. | AS Fleurance-La Sauvetat (6) | 1–4 | Toulouse Rodéo FC (5) |
| 30. | US Seysses-Frouzins (7) | 2–1 | Tarbes Pyrénées Football (5) |
| 31. | Stade St Affricain (8) | 1–0 | US Albi (6) |
| 32. | Quand Même Orleix (8) | 0–2 | SC Sébazac (8) |
| 33. | FC Pavien (8) | 2–2 (7–6 p) | Union St Jean FC (6) |
| 34. | FC Biars-Bretenoux (8) | 3–3 (5–4 p) | Luc Primaube FC (6) |
| 35. | St Juéry OF (8) | 1–3 | Auch Football (6) |
| 36. | AS Bressols (8) | 1–3 (a.e.t.) | AS Tournefeuille (6) |
| 37. | Ségala-Rieupeyroux-Salvetat (8) | 2–2 (2–4 p) | Montauban FCTG (7) |
| 38. | FC St Girons (9) | 0–6 | Blagnac FC (5) |
| 39. | FC Castelnau-de-Lévis (9) | 2–3 | FC Naucellois (9) |
| 40. | FC Nègrepelisse-Montricoux (9) | 1–1 (5–6 p) | Entente Golfech-St Paul-d'Espis (6) |
| 41. | Coquelicots Montéchois FC (9) | 1–4 | Pradines-St Vincent-Douelle-Mercuès Olt (6) |
| 42. | Elan Pyrénéen Bazet-Bordères-Lagarde (9) | 1–4 | Druelle FC (7) |
| 43. | Soues Cigognes FC (9) | 1–2 | Les Copains d'Abord (8) |

== Fifth round ==
These matches were played on 13 and 14 October 2018.

Fifth round results: Occitanie
| Tie no | Home team (tier) | Score | Away team (tier) |
|---|---|---|---|
| 1. | GC Lunel (7) | 0–2 | US Salinières Aigues Mortes (6) |
| 2. | Olympique Alès (5) | 4–2 | FC St Estève (6) |
| 3. | CO Soleil Levant Nîmes (7) | 0–1 | FC Alberes Argelès (6) |
| 4. | Canet Roussillon FC (5) | 3–0 | FA Carcassonne (6) |
| 5. | ES Pérols (8) | 0–6 | FC Sète 34 (4) |
| 6. | ES Marguerittes (10) | 1–3 | Stade Beaucairois (5) |
| 7. | AS Rousson (6) | 0–2 | AF Lozère (5) |
| 8. | AS Atlas Paillade (9) | 3–3 (1–4 p) | GC Uchaud (6) |
| 9. | AS Lattoise (6) | 2–2 (5–4 p) | RCO Agde (5) |
| 10. | Les Copains d'Abord (8) | 1–4 | US Seysses-Frouzins (7) |
| 11. | St Orens FC (7) | 1–0 | FC Pavien (8) |
| 12. | FC Naucellois (9) | 1–0 | Pradines-St Vincent-Douelle-Mercuès Olt (6) |
| 13. | Blagnac FC (5) | 1–1 (3–4 p) | Rodez AF (3) |
| 14. | AS Muret (5) | 1–1 (4–2 p) | Toulouse Métropole FC (6) |
| 15. | Auch Football (6) | 5–0 | ES St Simon (7) |
| 16. | Montauban FCTG (7) | 4–1 | ES Ste Eulalie-Villesèquelande (8) |
| 17. | AS Tournefeuille (6) | 1–2 (a.e.t.) | Luzenac AP (6) |
| 18. | Druelle FC (7) | 2–1 | Stade St Affricain (8) |
| 19. | US Plaisance (8) | 0–8 | Toulouse Rodéo FC (5) |
| 20. | SC Sébazac (8) | 0–4 | Entente Golfech-St Paul-d'Espis (6) |
| 21. | ES Fossatoise (8) | 1–6 | FC Biars-Bretenoux (8) |
| 22. | US Pibrac (6) | 0–2 | US Colomiers Football (4) |

== Sixth round ==
These matches were played on 27 and 28 October 2018.

Sixth round results: Occitanie
| Tie no | Home team (tier) | Score | Away team (tier) |
|---|---|---|---|
| 1. | Auch Football (6) | 1–1 (3–1 p) | US Colomiers Football (4) |
| 2. | US Salinières Aigues Mortes (6) | 4–0 | AS Lattoise (6) |
| 3. | FC Sète 34 (4) | 1–0 | AS Muret (5) |
| 4. | GC Uchaud (6) | 1–2 (a.e.t.) | St Orens FC (7) |
| 5. | Druelle FC (7) | 0–5 | Rodez AF (3) |
| 6. | US Seysses-Frouzins (7) | 0–3 | Luzenac AP (6) |
| 7. | Montauban FCTG (7) | 2–3 | AF Lozère (5) |
| 8. | Toulouse Rodéo FC (5) | 0–1 (a.e.t.) | Canet Roussillon FC (5) |
| 9. | FC Biars-Bretenoux (8) | 1–0 | FC Naucellois (9) |
| 10. | Entente Golfech-St Paul-d'Espis (6) | 1–5 | Olympique Alès (5) |
| 11. | Stade Beaucairois (5) | 1–0 | FC Alberes Argelès (6) |
