= Toulouse Rodéo FC =

French football club

Rodéo Football Club (Rodéo F.C.) is a football club based in Toulouse, France. Though the club's proper name is Rodéo Football Club, the club is often referred to as Toulouse Rodéo Football Club to show the club's location. The club played in Championnat National 3 from 2017 until 2020, after winning promotion from Division d'Honneur Midi-Pyrénées in 2015–16. Key player during this period being Zacharie Selma. They were relegated from 2019–20 Championnat National 3 and currently play in Régional 1 Occitanie.
