= US Revel =

Football club in Revel, Haute-Garonne, France

Revel
- Full name: Union Sportive Revéloise
- Founded: 1910; 115 years ago (as Revel Sport); 1926; 99 years ago (as US Revel)
- President: Didier Roques
- Manager: Jérôme Rouge
- League: Régional 1 Occitanie; Group B
- 2021–22: Régional 1 Occitanie; Group B, 13th of 14
- Website: https://www.usrevelfootball.com/

Union Sportive Revéloise, known as US Revel or simply Revel, is a football club based in Revel, Haute-Garonne, France. As of the 2023–24 season, it competes in the Régional 1, the sixth tier of the French football league system.

== History ==
The club was founded as Revel Sport in 1910. In 1926, it merged with Amicale Sportive Revéloise to create Union Sportive Revéloise, with the club's colors being chosen as red and black. From 1948 to 1965, Revel played seven individual seasons in the Championnat de France Amateur, which at the time was the highest level of amateur football in France.

In the 2023–24 Coupe de France, Revel was drawn against Ligue 1 champions Paris Saint-Germain in the round of 64. A video of the club's players' reaction to the draw went viral on social media. The match, which was held at the Stade Pierre-Fabre in Castres on 7 January 2024, ended in a 9–0 defeat for Revel.

== Honours ==
US Revel honours
Honour	No.	Years
Division d'Honneur Midi-Pyrénées	10	1930–31, 1933–34, 1937–38, 1950–51, 1952–53, 1954–55, 1960–61, 2000–01, 2002–03, 2009–10
Coupe du Midi-Pyrénées	1	1998–99
