= FC Bagnols Pont =

French football club

- Full name: Football Club Bagnols-sur-Cèze – Pont-Saint-Esprit
- Founded: 2000
- Ground: Stade Léo-Lagrange, Bagnols-sur-Cèze
- Capacity: 750
- Chairman: Serge Kayi
- Manager: Franck Orsoni
- League: Régional 1 Occitanie
- 2022–23: National 3 Group H, 14th (relegated)
Home colours

Football Club Bagnols-sur-Cèze – Pont-Saint-Esprit (Occitan Banhòus de Céser – Lo Pònt Sant Esperit; commonly referred to as FC Bagnols Pont or simply Bagnols Pont) is a French football club based in Bagnols-sur-Cèze in the Occitanie region. The club was founded on 21 July 2000 following the merger of two local clubs; Union Club Bagnols Jeunesse and Indépendante de Pont-Saint-Esprit. Bagnols Pont currently plays in Régional 1, the sixth tier of French football, spending just one season at the Championnat National 3 level after achieving promotion in the 2021–22 season.
