= Saint-Alban Aucamville FC =

French football club

- Full name: Saint-Alban Aucamville Football Club
- Founded: 1943
- Ground: Stade Marius Coudon, Saint-Alban
Home colours

Saint-Alban Aucamville Football Club is a French association football club founded in 1943 as Saint-Alban Omnisports. They are based in the town of Saint-Alban, Haute-Garonne and their home stadium is the Stade Marius Coudon. The current club came about as the result of a merger with US Aucamville (formed in 1972) in 2012.
