= US Salinières Aigues Mortes =

Football club in Aigues-Mortes, France

Aigues Mortes
- Full name: Union Sportive Salinières Aigues Mortes
- Nickname(s): Les Saliniers (The Salt Marshers)
- Stadium: Stade du Bourgidou
- Capacity: 5,000
- League: Régional 1 Occitanie; Group A
- 2024–25: National 3 Group J, 12th of 14 (relegated)
- Website: https://ussa-aiguesmortes.footeo.com/

Union Sportive Salinières Aigues Mortes is a football club based in Aigues-Mortes, France. They play in Championnat National 3, the fifth tier of French football. The club's colours are blue and white.

The furthest round the club has reached in the Coupe de France is the seventh round, which they have participated in on three occasions in the 21st century.
