= AS Tournefeuille =

French football club

Tournefeuille
- Full name: Association Sportive de Tournefeuille
- Founded: 1926
- Ground: Stade Municipal, Tournefeuille
- Chairman: Dominique Lucazeau
- Manager: Jean Deneys
- League: CFA 2 Group F
Home colours

Association Sportive de Tournefeuille is a French association football club founded in 1926. The club is based in the town of Tournefeuille and their home stadium is the Stade Municipal. As of the 2009–10 season, they play in the Championnat de France amateur 2 Group F. Three time Premier League-winning left-back, Gael Clichy played for Tournefeuille's youth academy between 1998 and 2000.

== Notable players ==
- (France) Gaël Clichy (youth)
