= 2021–22 Coupe de France =

Football tournament season

Tournament details
- Country: France
- Dates: 27 June 2021 – 7 May 2022
- Teams: 7,307

Final positions
- Champions: Nantes (4th title)
- Runners-up: Nice

Tournament statistics
- Top goal scorer(s): Tolu Arokodare; Mohamed Ben Fredj; Wissam Ben Yedder; Ludovic Blas; Kylian Mbappé; Arkadiusz Milik (5 goals each)

The 2021–22 Coupe de France was the 105th season of the main football cup competition of France. The competition was organised by the French Football Federation (FFF) and was open to all clubs in French football, as well as clubs from the overseas departments and territories (Guadeloupe, French Guiana, Martinique, Mayotte, New Caledonia, Tahiti, Réunion, Saint Martin, and Saint Pierre and Miquelon).

The competition returned largely to the format of 2019–20 after the changes last season due to the COVID-19 pandemic in France. However, on 21 October 2021 it was announced that New Caledonia would not be represented in the competition due to the situation in that territory.

Paris Saint-Germain were the defending champions, but were knocked out in the round of 16 by Nice on penalties. In the final on 7 May, Nantes beat Nice 1–0 to claim their fourth Coupe de France title.

== Dates ==
Dates for the first two qualifying round, and any preliminaries required, were set by the individual Regional leagues. From round three, the FFF defined the calendar, with rounds up to and including the round of 32 being scheduled for weekends. The later rounds up to, but not including, the final, taking place on midweek evenings. The final was originally scheduled for Saturday 8 May 2022, but moved to 7 May 2022.

Round	Dates
Third round	18–19 September 2021
Fourth round	2–3 October 2021
Fifth round	16–17 October 2021
Sixth round	30–31 October 2021
Seventh round	13–14 November 2021
Eighth round	27–28 November 2021
Round of 64	16–19 December 2021
Round of 32	2–4 January 2022
Round of 16	28–31 January 2022
Quarter-finals	8–10 February 2022
Semi-finals	1–2 March 2022
Final	7 May 2022

== Notable rule changes ==
After gaining a second seventh-round spot last season, Mayotte lost it this season, due to the FFF ruling that there were no stadia in the territory of the standard required to host a seventh-round match. The single qualifying team from Mayotte would therefore play its seventh-round match in mainland France.

After a DNCG ruling excluding Niort from the 2021–22 competition, only 19 Ligue 2 teams entered at the seventh-round stage.

The number of teams qualifying from each region returned to those of the 2019–20 competition, with adjustments to account for the above two points, i.e. 146 rather than 144 mainland teams qualified for the seventh round.

On 21 October 2021, it was announced that no team from New Caledonia would be present in the seventh round, due to the ongoing COVID-19 pandemic in New Caledonia, and the imposition of lockdown until 31 October 2021.

On 31 December 2021, due to the rising number of COVID-19 cases, the FFF suspended the competition rule which mandated that teams must field seven players who participated in one of the last two matches, in order to avoid potential postponements. From the Round of 32, teams may field any number of players from their reserve or youth teams.

== Teams ==
=== Round 1 to 6 ===
The first six rounds, and any preliminaries required, were organised by the Regional Leagues and the Overseas Territories, who allowed teams from within their league structure to enter at any point up to the third round. Teams from Championnat National 3 entered at the third round, those from Championnat National 2 entered at the fourth round and those from Championnat National entered at the fifth round.

The number of teams entering at each qualifying round was as follows:

Region	Prelim	First	Second	Third	Fourth	Fifth
Nouvelle-Aquitaine		592	81	12	4	0
Pays de la Loire		482	9	34	2	3
Centre-Val de Loire	50	109	67	10	6	2
Corsica			4	26	0	1
Bourgogne-Franche-Comté		324	58	12	1	0
Grand Est		820	70	54	3	1
Méditerranée	30	185	14	6	7	0
Occitanie		424	66	11	3	1
Hauts-de-France		818	187	10	2	2
Normandy		318	59	11	2	1
Brittany		578	105	11	4	2
Paris IDF		360	102	9	9	2
Auvergne-Rhône-Alpes		836	58	38	8	3
Réunion					16	0
Mayotte	32	48	0	0	0	0
Guadeloupe						8
Martinique						8
French Guiana			2	31	0	0
Saint Pierre and Miquelon		2	1 (Note: winner entered into the Pays-de-la-Loire draw)			
Total	112	5896	883	275	67	34

=== Round 7 ===
The 146 qualifiers from the Regional Leagues were joined by the 10 qualifiers from the Overseas Territories and 19 eligible 2021–22 Ligue 2 teams. The qualifiers from Réunion, Martinique, Guadeloupe and French Guiana play off in internal matches.

==== Ligue 2 ====
- Ajaccio
- Amiens
- Auxerre
- Bastia
- Caen
- Dijon
- Dunkerque
- Grenoble
- Guingamp
- Le Havre
- Nancy
- Nîmes
- Quevilly-Rouen
- Paris FC
- Pau
- Rodez
- Sochaux
- Toulouse
- Valenciennes

==== Regional Leagues ====
Nouvelle Aquitaine (13 teams)

- Angoulême Charente FC (4)
- Bergerac Périgord FC (4)
- Trélissac-Antonne Périgord FC (4)
- US Chauvigny (5)
- FC Libourne (5)
- Stade Bordelais (5)
- Stade Poitevin FC (5)
- ESA Brive (6)
- SAG Cestas (6)
- CS Feytiat (6)
- ES Guérétoise (6)
- AS Panazol (7)
- Limens JSA (8)

Pays de la Loire (11 teams)

- SO Cholet (3)
- Le Mans FC (3)
- Stade Lavallois (3)
- Les Herbiers VF (4)
- Voltigeurs de Châteaubriant (4)
- La Roche VF (5)
- US Philbertine Football (5)
- Olympique Saumur FC (5)
- ESOF La Roche-sur-Yon (6)
- USJA Carquefou (7)
- Luçon FC (7)

Centre-Val de Loire (6 teams)

- US Orléans (3)
- C'Chartres Football (4)
- J3S Amilly (5)
- FC Ouest Tourangeau (5)
- Vierzon FC (5)
- CS Mainvilliers (7)

Corsica (2 teams)

- FC Bastia-Borgo (3)
- Gazélec Ajaccio (5)

Bourgogne-Franche-Comté (8 teams)

- Jura Sud Foot (4)
- Jura Dolois Football (5)
- FC Morteau-Montlebon (5)
- ASC Saint-Apollinaire (5)
- Union Cosnoise Sportive (6)
- RC Lons-le-Saunier (6)
- Bresse Jura Foot (7)
- FR Saint Marcel (7)

Grand Est (19 teams)

- CS Sedan Ardennes (3)
- SC Schiltigheim (4)
- ASC Biesheim (5)
- FC Mulhouse (5)
- US Sarre-Union (5)
- ES Thaon (5)
- FC Soleil Bischheim (6)
- RC Champigneulles (6)
- AS Illzach Modenheim (6)
- FC Nogentais (6)
- EF Reims Sainte-Anne Châtillons (6)
- FC Sarrebourg (6)
- ASL Kœtzingue (7)
- RS Magny (7)
- ES Molsheim-Ernolsheim (7)
- AS Morhange (7)
- US Thionville Lusitanos (7)
- FC Éloyes (8)
- UL Plantières Metz (8)

Méditerranée (5 teams)

- Aubagne FC (4)
- FC Martigues (4)
- AS Cannes (5)
- ES Cannet Rocheville (5)
- FC Istres (5)

Occitanie (10 teams)

- Canet Roussillon FC (4)
- RCO Agde (5)
- Olympique Alès (5)
- AS Muret (5)
- AS Frontignan AC (6)
- Toulouse Métropole FC (6)
- JS Chemin Bas d'Avignon (7)
- Montauban FCTG (7)
- FC Chusclan-Laudun-l'Ardoise (8) (Note: A technical challenge on the outcome of the sixth round game led to the game being ordered to be replayed on 7 November 2021, however the appeal commission overruled the decision, re-instating the original result.)
- FC Langlade (10)

Hauts-de-France (20 teams)

- FC Chambly (3)
- AS Beauvais Oise (4)
- AC Amiens (5)
- Feignies Aulnoye FC (5)
- Wasquehal Football (5)
- Stade Béthunois (6)
- AC Cambrai (6)
- FC Loon-Plage (6)
- Olympique Lumbrois (6)
- US Tourcoing FC (6)
- ES Bully-les-Mines (7)
- AS Étaples (7)
- US Esquelbecq (7)
- FC Raismes (7)
- US Mineurs Waziers (7)
- Calonne-Ricouart FC Cite 6 (8)
- FC Dutemple (8)
- ES Anzin-Saint-Aubin (9)
- ESM Hamel (10)
- RC Salouël (10)

Normandy (8 teams)

- FC Rouen (4)
- AG Caennaise (5)
- Évreux FC 27 (5)
- CMS Oissel (5)
- FC Saint-Lô Manche (5)
- AS Trouville-Deauville (6)
- AS Val de Reuil-Vaudreuil-Poses (7)
- FC Saint-Julien Petit Quevilly (8)

Brittany (14 teams)

- Stade Briochin (3)
- Stade Plabennécois (4)
- US Saint-Malo (4)
- Vannes OC (4)
- AS Vitré (4)
- Dinan-Léhon FC (5)
- Fougères AGLD (5)
- Lannion FC (5)
- US Trégunc (5)
- PD Ergué-Gabéric (6)
- US Liffré (6)
- Plancoët-Arguenon FC (7)
- US Perros-Louannec (7)
- CS Plédran (8)

Paris-Île-de-France (11 teams)

- US Créteil-Lusitanos (3)
- Red Star F.C. (3)
- Football Club 93 Bobigny-Bagnolet-Gagny (4)
- AS Poissy (4)
- FC Versailles 78 (4)
- ESA Linas-Montlhéry (5)
- Espérance Aulnay (6)
- Cergy Pontoise FC (6)
- AS Chatou (6)
- US Sénart-Moissy (6)
- ES Nanterre (7)

Auvergne-Rhône-Alpes (19 teams)

- Football Bourg-en-Bresse Péronnas 01 (3)
- FC Villefranche (3)
- Andrézieux-Bouthéon FC (4)
- Le Puy Foot 43 Auvergne (4)
- Lyon La Duchère (4)
- Moulins Yzeure Foot (4)
- Ain Sud Foot (5)
- FC Bourgoin-Jallieu (5)
- Chambéry SF (5)
- Hauts Lyonnais (5)
- FC Limonest Saint-Didier (5)
- Montluçon Football (5)
- US Blavozy (6)
- Vénissieux FC (6)
- RC Vichy (6)
- Côte Chaude Sportif (7)
- AS Montchat Lyon (7)
- CS Neuville (7)
- FC Saint-Cyr Collonges au Mont d'Or (8)

==== Overseas Territories teams ====
Mayotte: 1 team

- AS Jumeaux de Mzouazia

Réunion: 2 teams

- ASC Makes
- Saint-Denis FC

Martinique: 2 teams

- Club Colonial
- Club Franciscain

Guadeloupe: 2 teams

- Solidarité-Scolaire
- AS Gosier

French Guiana: 2 teams

- ASC Ouest
- CSC Cayenne

(French Polynesia) Tahiti: 1 team

- A.S. Vénus (Note: Winner of 2020–21 Tahiti Cup.)

New Caledonia: 0 teams

- none

=== Round 8 ===
The winners of the seventh round matches in Guadeloupe and Martinique played their eighth round matches at home against teams from mainland France. Should the team from Tahiti win their seventh round match, they would also play a home game against a team from mainland France. On 2 November 2021 a draw took place to prioritise the list of National, National 2 and National 3 clubs who had put themselves forward as candidates for overseas travel. The highest prioritised team which qualifies for the eighth round will travel to Guadeloupe, the second highest will travel to Martinique and the third highest will travel to Tahiti if required.

==== Priority list of mainland teams ====
1. ASC Saint-Apollinaire (5)
2. SO Cholet (3)
3. US Sarre-Union (5)
4. Football Club 93 Bobigny-Bagnolet-Gagny (4)
5. US Philbertine Football (5)
6. Dinan-Léhon FC (5)
7. CMS Oissel (5)
8. Wasquehal Football (5)
9. Évreux FC 27 (5)
10. ES Thaon (5)
11. FC Versailles 78 (4)
12. Olympique Saumur FC (5)

=== Round of 64 ===
The 44 qualifying teams from Round 8 were joined by the 20 2021–22 Ligue 1 teams. 32 ties were drawn in regional groups.

- Angers
- Bordeaux
- Brest
- Clermont
- Lens
- Lille
- Lorient
- Lyon
- Marseille
- Metz
- Monaco
- Montpellier
- Nantes
- Nice
- Paris Saint-Germain
- Reims
- Rennes
- Saint-Étienne
- Strasbourg
- Troyes

=== Later rounds ===
Later rounds are open draws with no regional grouping.

== Seventh round ==
Due to there being no New Caledeonia team in the seventh round draw, a mainland team were awarded a bye to the eighth round.

- The seventh round in Guadeloupe, Martinique, French Guiana and Réunion took place between the two qualifying teams from each territory, and are pre-drawn by the local league.
- Teams were divided into ten groups, by geography and to ensure the groups are balanced in terms of the levels of the teams. The teams from Tahiti and Mayotte were included in groups E and I respectively. An exempt ball was included in group J.

=== Overseas playoff ties ===
11 November 2021	ASC Makes (Réunion)	1–9	(Réunion) Saint-Denis FC	Saint-Pierre
16:30 Réunion Time	Palany 65'	Report	Bakari-Said 7', 21'; Diallo 9', 20', 62', 82'; Jeffrey Damour 31'; Simouri 88'; Abdullah 90'	Stadium: Stade Michel Volnay; Referee: David Lasour

13 November 2021	ASC Ouest (French Guiana)	0–2	(French Guiana) CSC Cayenne	Cayenne
15:30 GFT		Report	Issorat; Jean-Jacques	Stadium: Stade Municipal Dr. Edmard Lama; Referee: Anthony Matthew

13 November 2021	Solidarité-Scolaire (Guadeloupe)	2–1	(Guadeloupe) AS Gosier	Les Abymes
20:00 AST	Gaydu 21'; Mirval 72'	Report	Jean-François 90+2'	Stadium: Stade René Serge Nabajoth; Referee: Nicolas Wassouf

13 November 2021	Club Colonial (Martinique)	0–1	(Martinique) Club Franciscain	Fort-de-France
19:00 AST		Report	Polomat 82'	Stadium: Stade Pierre-Aliker; Referee: Guy Grégory Prevot

=== Main draw ===
The main draw was carried out on 3 November 2021. Ties will be played on 12, 13 and 14 November 2021. Several ties were played at alternate stadia due to the stadium of the home clubs not being of sufficient standard.

==== Group A ====
13 November 2021	US Thionville Lusitanos (7)	0–5	ASC Biesheim (5)	Thionville
18:00 CET		Report	Chevrier 44'; Genghini 56'; Alves 72'; Ribeiro 75'; Helligenstein 88'	Stadium: Stade Omnisports de Guentrage; Referee: Romain Perpinan

14 November 2021	AS Morhange (7)	0–4	ES Thaon (5)	Saint-Avold
14:00 CET		Report	Dufour 50'; Gazagnes 59'; Ulhrich 87'; Colin 90'	Stadium: Stade du Centre; Referee: Tawbane Kani

14 November 2021	UL Plantières Metz (8)	1–3	Nancy (2)	Longeville-lès-Metz (Note: Tie was originally reversed from original draw due to UL Plantières Metz not having a ground of the required standard. On 10 November 2021 it was announced that funding had been raised to pay the security costs at Stade Saint-Symphorien, near Metz, and the original tie was reinstated.)
14:00 CET	Santos 17'	Report	Triboulet 59'; Jung 68'; Francke 85'	Stadium: Stade Saint-Symphorien; Referee: Frank Schneider

14 November 2021	RC Champigneulles (6)	1–1 (2–4 p)	FC Soleil Bischheim (6)	Champigneulles
14:00 CET	Umbdenstock 12'	Report	Molter 42' (o.g.)	Stadium: Stade du Malnoy; Referee: Valentin Ougier

14 November 2021	EF Reims Sainte-Anne Châtillons (6)	1–1 (4–3 p)	Football Club 93 Bobigny-Bagnolet-Gagny (4)	Cormontreuil
14:00 CET	Logette 39'	Report	Bessomen 77'	Stadium: Stade Robert Pirès; Referee: Victor Petigny

14 November 2021	RS Magny (7)	1–1 (4–2 p)	FC Éloyes (8)	Metz
14:00 CET	Belvoix 48'	Report	Martins 43'	Stadium: Stade du Plateau; Referee: Brice Bayour

13 November 2021	FC Sarrebourg (6)	1–1 (4–3 p)	Espérance Aulnay (6)	Sarrebourg
18:00 CET	Bassilekin 9'	Report	Gouriche 36'	Stadium: Stade Jean-Jacques Morin; Referee: Charlie Sorel

14 November 2021	ES Molsheim-Ernolsheim (7)	1–1 (1–4 p)	US Créteil-Lusitanos (3)	Molsheim
16:30 CET	Hoffert 70'	Report	Pembélé 18'	Stadium: Parc des Sports; Referee: Alexandre Mercier

14 November 2021	CS Sedan Ardennes (3)	2–2 (3–5 p)	Paris FC (2)	Sedan
16:00 CET	Colin 11'; Géran 52'	Report	Diakité 27'; Caddy 76'	Stadium: Stade Louis Dugauguez; Referee: Alexandre Perreau Niel

13 November 2021	SC Schiltigheim (4)	1–1 (4–5 p)	US Sarre-Union (5)	Schiltigheim
18:00 CET	Salhi 89'	Report	Delgado 81'	Stadium: Stade de l'Aar; Referee: Renaud Potier

==== Group B ====
14 November 2021	AS Montchat Lyon (7)	1–0	FR Saint Marcel (7)	Lyon
14:00 CET	Sefer 24'	Report		Stadium: Stade Vuillermet; Referee: Julien Schmitt

13 November 2021	Bresse Jura Foot (7)	1–3	Sochaux (2)	Louhans
14:30 CET	Elbachir 90'	Report	Faraj 56'; Tebily 66'; Niane 79'	Stadium: Stade du Bram; Referee: William Toulliou

13 November 2021	Jura Dolois Football (5)	0–4	Football Bourg-en-Bresse Péronnas 01 (3)	Dole
18:00 CET		Report	Garita 4'; Agounon 37'; Fleurier 45'; Soubervie 55' (pen.)	Stadium: Stade Robert Bobin; Referee: Philippe Lucas

13 November 2021	RC Lons-le-Saunier (6)	2–4	Jura Sud Foot (4)	Lons-le-Saunier
18:00 CET	Helfer-Lebert 78', 89'	Report	Faucher 6'; Tiago 58'; Khaled 81', 90'	Stadium: Stade Municipal; Referee: Nicolas Brotons

14 November 2021	FC Morteau-Montlebon (5)	4–0	FC Nogentais (6)	Montlebon
14:00 CET	Benchagra 12', 61'; Journot 53'; Gaume 77'	Report		Stadium: Stade Henri Schaller; Referee: Edgar Barenton

13 November 2021	ASC Saint-Apollinaire (5)	0–3	Dijon (2)	Dijon
14:00 CET		Report	Jacob 41'; Scheidler 65', 85'	Stadium: Stade Gaston Gérard; Referee: Antoine Valet

13 November 2021	AS Illzach Modenheim (6)	0–2	FC Mulhouse (5)	Illzach
18:00 CET		Report	Matuba 53'; Kourouma 78'	Stadium: Stade Joseph Biechlin; Referee: Aldric Chancioux

13 November 2021	ASL Kœtzingue (7)	0–4	Lyon La Duchère (4)	Kembs
17:00 CET		Report	Ndiaye 39'; Fuss 41' (pen.), 59'; Soumah 83'	Stadium: Stade Rhénan; Referee: Geoffrey Kubler

==== Group C ====
14 November 2021	Côte Chaude Sportif (7)	0–3	Hauts Lyonnais (5)	Saint-Étienne
14:00 CET		Report	Boussaïd 40'; Gromat 49'; Chambriard 51'	Stadium: Stade Auguste Dury; Referee: Louis Lungeri

13 November 2021	FC Bourgoin-Jallieu (5)	0–0 (4–3 p)	Ain Sud Foot (5)	Bourgoin-Jallieu
18:00 CET		Report		Stadium: Stade Pierre Rajon; Referee: Maxime Apruzzese

13 November 2021	FC Saint-Cyr Collonges au Mont d'Or (8)	1–2	Grenoble (2)	Craponne
14:00 CET	Moukaddam 75' (pen.)	Report	Anani 6'; Boissy 26'	Stadium: Stade Charles Trévoux; Referee: Aurélien Petit

13 November 2021	RC Vichy (6)	1–2	Andrézieux-Bouthéon FC (4)	Vichy
18:00 CET	Sanoussy 56'	Report	Goudiaby 8', 44'	Stadium: Stade Louis Darragon; Referee: Willy Bertolotti

13 November 2021	FC Limonest Saint-Didier (5)	2–4	Auxerre (2)	Limonest
18:00 CET	Feneuil 1'; Benedick 43'	Report	Ben Fredj 24', 52', 83'; Joly 40'	Stadium: Parc des Sports Courtois-Fillot; Referee: Arnaud Baert

13 November 2021	Chambéry SF (5)	2–1	FC Villefranche (3)	Chambéry
18:00 CET	Scarantino 9'; Fortier 80'	Report	Dabasse 83'	Stadium: Plaine de Jeux Mager; Referee: Robin Chapapria

13 November 2021	Vénissieux FC (6)	2–2 (6–5 p)	Union Cosnoise Sportive (6)	Vénissieux
18:00 CET	Teka Basi 6'; Vernet 16'		Kalozafy 29', 52'	Stadium: Stade Laurent Gérin; Referee: Julien Rouquette

13 November 2021	CS Neuville (7)	1–2	Moulins Yzeure Foot (4)	Neuville-sur-Saône
15:30 CET	Sole 13'	Report	Alouache 28' (pen.); Racollet 90+3'	Stadium: Stade Jean Obousiier; Referee: Gaëtan Martin

==== Group D ====
13 November 2021	FC Langlade (10)	1–2	RCO Agde (5)	Langlade
14:30 CET	Benabdellah 84'	Report	Darmon 28', 74'	Stadium: Stade Raymond Roure; Referee: Jordane Lomi

14 November 2021	JS Chemin Bas d'Avignon (7)	0–0 (5–4 p)	AS Frontignan AC (6)	Nîmes
14:00 CET		Report		Stadium: Stade Jean-Bouin; Referee: Soulaimane Chamel

13 November 2021	US Blavozy (6)	1–2	Rodez (2)	Le Puy-en-Velay
17:00	Pezaire 36'	Report	Chougrani 47', 65'	Stadium: Stade Charles Massot; Referee: Mickaël Leleu

13 November 2021	AS Cannes (5)	1–1 (3–0 p)	Le Puy Foot 43 Auvergne (4)	Cannes
18:00 CET	Sanches Silva 45'	Report	Fourrier 64'	Stadium: Stade Pierre de Coubertin; Referee: Aurélien Saunier

13 November 2021	ES Cannet Rocheville (5)	3–2	FC Istres (5)	Le Cannet
17:00 CET	Goumy 3'; Core 5'; Bennani 67'	Report	Daoud 85'; Zemoura 90+4'	Stadium: Stade Maillan; Referee: Guillaume Bousquet

14 November 2021	Olympique Alès (5)	0–2	FC Bastia-Borgo (3)	Alès
14:00 CET		Report	Ba 78'; Marmot 89'	Stadium: Stade Pierre Pibarot; Referee: Faouzi Benchabane

13 November 2021	Aubagne FC (4)	2–2 (5–4 p)	FC Martigues (4)	Aubagne
18:00 CET	Mendy 22'; Gandi 45' (pen.)	Report	Kadir 61'; Caddy 70'	Stadium: Stade de Lattre-de-Tassigny; Referee: Guillaume Janin

13 November 2021	FC Chusclan-Laudun-l'Ardoise (8) (Note: A technical challenge on the outcome of the sixth round game led to the game being ordered to be replayed on 7 November 2021, however the appeal commission overruled the decision, re-instating the original result.)	0–3	Nîmes (2)	Pont-Saint-Esprit
14:00 CET		Report	Koné 36'; Ómarsson 54'; Benrahou 90' (pen.)	Stadium: Stade Clos Bon Aure; Referee: Ahmed Taleb

==== Group E ====
13 November 2021	Montluçon Football (5)	0–1	Bergerac Périgord FC (4)	Montluçon
18:00 CET		Report	Bakir 84'	Stadium: Stade Dunlop; Referee: Yann Gazagnes

13 November 2021	Stade Bordelais (5)	2–1	AS Muret (5)	Le Bouscat
14:00 CET	Seck 22'; Martinet 43'	Report	Youlou Loufoukou 76'	Stadium: Stade Sainte Germaine; Referee: Pierre Retail

13 November 2021	SAG Cestas (6)	0–2	SO Cholet (3)	Canejan
14:00 CET		Report	Le Méhauté 22'; Antunes 64' (o.g.)	Stadium: Stade des Peyrères; Referee: Azzedine Souifi

13 November 2021	Canet Roussillon FC (4)	2–2 (3–2 p)	Pau (2)	Canet-en-Roussillon
19:00 CET	Ouadoudi 40'; Rambaud 67'	Report	Essende 4'; Gomis 18'	Stadium: Stade Saint-Michel; Referee: Floris Aubin

13 November 2021	Toulouse Métropole FC (6)	1–0	ESA Brive (6)	Toulouse
18:00 CET	Belkoussa 81'	Report		Stadium: Stade Pierre Cahuzac; Referee: Nicolas Houguet

14 November 2021	Limens JSA (8)	1–1 (3–5 p)	Montauban FCTG (7)	Saint-Astier
15:00 CET	Mey 66'	Report	Frischmann 32'	Stadium: Stade Raymond Gimel; Referee: Aurélien Grizon

13 November 2021	Trélissac-Antonne Périgord FC (4)	2–0	(French Polynesia) A.S. Vénus	Trélissac
19:00 CET	Gérard 37'; Touré 49'	Report		Stadium: Stade Firmin Daudou; Referee: Jacques Salze

13 November 2021	FC Libourne (5)	0–0 (1–3 p)	Toulouse (2)	Libourne
16:05		Report		Stadium: Stade Jean-Antoine Moueix; Referee: Romain Delpech

==== Group F ====
13 November 2021	ES Anzin-Saint-Aubin (9)	0–5	Amiens (2)	Arras
14:00 CET		Report	Arokodare 52', 59', 65'; Mendy 68'; Gnahoré 77'	Stadium: Stade Degouve-Brabant; Referee: Mehdi Mokhtari

14 November 2021	AC Cambrai (6)	3–0	FC Raismes (7)	Cambrai
14:00 CET	Mazure 8'; Martin 27'; Camara 34'	Report		Stadium: Stade de la Liberté; Referee: Yann Flament

14 November 2021	FC Dutemple (8)	1–2	AC Amiens (5)	Valenciennes
14:00 CET	Leghait 16'	Report	Despois de Folleville 69'; Slidja 72'	Stadium: Stade Christophe Laurent; Referee: Maxence Richard

14 November 2021	ES Bully-les-Mines (7)	0–6	Feignies Aulnoye FC (5)	Bully-les-Mines
14:00 CET		Report	Sambou 17', 81'; Obino 29'; Lachaab 40'; Lemoine 68', 86'	Stadium: Stade René Corbelle; Referee: Valentin Cardon

14 November 2021	US Tourcoing FC (6)	0–2	Valenciennes (2)	Tourcoing
14:30 CET		Report	Hamache 57'; Sidibe 67'	Stadium: Stade Charles Van de Veegaete; Referee: Ali Djedid

13 November 2021	Calonne-Ricouart FC Cite 6 (8)	0–0 (5–3 p)	CMS Oissel (5)	Béthune
16:00 CET		Report		Stadium: Stade Hermant-Deprez; Referee: Timothé Bonnot

14 November 2021	ESM Hamel (10)	1–3	RC Salouël (10)	Douai
14:00 CET	Allem 65' (pen.)	Report	Roger 7'; Louette 28'; Gorenflos 52'	Stadium: Stade Demény; Referee: Tifenn LeProdhomme

14 November 2021	Wasquehal Football (5)	4–0	Stade Béthunois (6)	Wasquehal
14:00 CET	Lounas 36'; Rezig 57', 65'; Sadsaoud 81'	Report		Stadium: Complexe Sportif Lucien Montagne; Referee: Marc Michout

12 November 2021	FC Chambly (3)	3–2	FC Rouen (4)	Chambly
19:00 CET	Vincent 57'; Dauchy 62'; Heinry 72'	Report	Dogo 52'; Hitouss 90+2'	Stadium: Stade des Marais; Referee: Marc Bollengier

21 November 2021 (Note: The match on 14 November was halted when an AS Beauvais Oise player was badly injured. A helicopter was summoned and landed at the ground, delaying the restart. With no floodlights available, the match could not be completed. US Mineurs Waziers led 1–0 at the time. The match was replayed on 21 November.)	US Mineurs Waziers (7)	1–3	AS Beauvais Oise (4)	Waziers
14:00 CET	Leroy 75'	Report	Fallempin 9'; Touré 32'; Tapé 78'	Stadium: Stade Gayant; Referee: Romain Zamo

==== Group G ====
14 November 2021	J3S Amilly (5)	3–1	Cergy Pontoise FC (6)	Amilly
14:00 CET	Moyo 39'; Khalil 44'; Ait Bahadou 90'	Report	Dieng 80'	Stadium: Stade Georges Clériceau; Referee: Maxim Plat

13 November 2021	AS Étaples (7)	1–3	Quevilly-Rouen (2)	Le Touquet
19:00 CET	Legal 53'	Report	Dadoune 25'; Ndilu 38'; Nazon 67'	Stadium: Stade Gérard Houllier; Referee: Benjamin Lepaysant

14 November 2021	AS Val de Reuil-Vaudreuil-Poses (7)	0–3	Gazélec Ajaccio (5)	Val-de-Reuil
14:00 CET			Duflos 5' (pen.); Touré 8'; Ménard 65'	Stadium: Parc des Sports; Referee: Loïc Mouton

13 November 2021	US Esquelbecq (7)	1–3	Red Star F.C. (3)	Steenvorde
18:00 CET	Aboukassem 76'	Report	Benali 43'; Nilor 72'; Bosca 90'	Stadium: Stade Municipal; Referee: Yohan Gagnant

13 November 2021	ESA Linas-Montlhéry (5)	1–0	Dunkerque (2)	Montlhéry
18:00 CET	Bouvil 90'	Report		Stadium: Stade Paul Desgouillons; Referee: Anthony Ustaritz

14 November 2021	FC Loon-Plage (6)	3–3 (3–4 p)	Évreux FC 27 (5)	Loon-Plage
14:00 CET	Terrier 53'; Mihoubi 63'; Janeszko 90+5' (pen.)	Report	Borja Viegas d'Abreu 16'; Gomis 51'; Mendés 60'	Stadium: Stade Marcel Rosseel; Referee: Lucas Baudon

14 November 2021	Olympique Lumbrois (6)	2–3	FC Versailles 78 (4)	Lumbres
14:00 CET	Massaki 35' (pen.), 76' (pen.)	Report	Ibayi 70', 83'; Pham Ba 85'	Stadium: Stade Jean Lebas; Referee: Clément Visbecq

14 November 2021	FC Saint-Julien Petit Quevilly (8)	1–2	AS Poissy (4)	Le Petit-Quevilly
14:00 CET	Razali 65'	Report	Touré 37', 90+4'	Stadium: Stade Mahmoud-Tiarci; Referee: Mirhane Abdallah

==== Group H ====
13 November 2021	Vierzon FC (5)	0–2	Le Havre (2)	Vierzon
17:00 CET		Report	Alioui 51'; Bâ 88'	Stadium: Stade de Brouhot; Referee: Samir Zolota

13 November 2021	FC Ouest Tourangeau (5)	0–1	US Chauvigny (5)	Ballan-Miré
17:00 CET		Report	Biaka 71'	Stadium: Complexe Sportif de la Haye; Referee: Kévin Barbin

13 November 2021	ES Guérétoise (6)	1–1 (2–4 p)	C'Chartres Football (4)	Guéret
19:00 CET	Diemé 20'	Report	Archimbaud 47' (pen.)	Stadium: Stade Léo Lagrange; Referee: Cédric Mouysset

14 November 2021	AS Chatou (6)	3–2	ES Nanterre (7)	Croissy-sur-Seine
14:00 CET	S. Sylla 38'; Jacqueray 40'; Louasil 50'	Report	A. Sylla 31'; Gentes 68'	Stadium: Parc des Sports; Referee: Aurélien Planchais-Godefroy

12 November 2021	Ajaccio (2)	0–0 (3–4 p)	US Orléans (3)	Ajaccio
20:00 CET				Stadium: Stade François Coty; Referee: Hakim Ben El Hadj Salem

14 November 2021	CS Feytiat (6)	0–2	Stade Poitevin FC (5)	Feytiat
14:00 CET		Report	Kibundu 2'; Cuvier 17'	Stadium: Stade Roger Couderc; Referee: Eddy Rosier

14 November 2021	AS Panazol (7)	2–1	US Sénart-Moissy (6)	Panazol
14:00 CET	Diambou 67'; Boudinar 89'	Report	Ndangi 33'	Stadium: Stade de Morpiènas; Referee: Gaël Gratianne

13 November 2021	CS Mainvilliers (7)	1–3	Angoulême Charente FC (4)	Chartres
19:00 CET	Adelaide 55' (pen.)	Report	Dieye 6'; Marchessau 86'; Lobo 88'	Stadium: Stade Jacques-Couvret; Referee: Julien Reynet

==== Group I ====
13 November 2021	Dinan-Léhon FC (5)	1–1 (4–1 p)	Caen (2)	Saint-Malo
18:00 CET	Coiffic 4'	Report	Nuno da Costa 87'	Stadium: Stade de Marville; Referee: Cédric dos Santos

13 November 2021	Stade Plabennécois (4)	0–0 (2–3 p)	US Saint-Malo (4)	Plabennec
18:00 CET		Report		Stadium: Stade de Kervéguen; Referee: Brendan Roffet

14 November 2021	US Perros-Louannec (7)	1–1 (3–2 p)	Lannion FC (5)	Perros-Guirec
14:00 CET	Le Bivic 64'	Report	Deveaux 56'	Stadium: Stade Yves Le Jannou; Referee: Cyril Dell'Angela

13 November 2021	AG Caennaise (5)	2–3	AS Vitré (4)	Caen
18:00 CET	Hamel 25'; Dias Ferreira 73'	Report	Delanoë 55'; Jourdan 75'; Gagnon 79'	Stadium: Stade de Venoix; Referee: Félicien Gazon

13 November 2021	US Liffré (6)	0–8	Guingamp (2)	Liffré
15:00 CET		Report	Sampaio 23'; Gomis 27'; L’Helgouac’h 37' (o.g.); Phaeton 47', 52'; Barthelmé 57'; Abi 63', 72'	Stadium: Stade Nelson Paillou; Attendance: 2,900; Referee: Bartolomeu Varela Teles

13 November 2021	FC Saint-Lô Manche (5)	1–2	Stade Briochin (3)	Saint-Lô
18:00 CET	Bresteau 90'	Report	Saunié 53' (o.g.); Benhaim 58'	Stadium: Stade Louis Villemer; Referee: Damien Rossini

13 November 2021	CS Plédran (8)	1–5	(Mayotte) AS Jumeaux de Mzouazia	Saint-Brieuc
14:30 CET	Pasco 86'	Report	Abdou 26'; Noussoura 42'; Kamal 53', 62'; Bamdou 90+3'	Stadium: Stade Fred-Aubert; Referee: Lyes Boukeroui

14 November 2021	AS Trouville-Deauville (6)	1–1 (4–5 p)	Plancoët-Arguenon FC (7)	Deauville
14:00 CET	N'Kusu 75'	Report	Letonturier 24'	Stadium: Stade du Commandant Hébert; Referee: Valentin Giorgetti

==== Group J ====
13 November 2021	Fougères AGLD (5)	0–2	Bastia (2)	Fougères
19:00 CET		Report	Robic 69'; Salles-Lamonge 85'	Stadium: Stade Jean Manfredi Paron Nord; Referee: Pierre Legat

13 November 2021	Les Herbiers VF (4)	1–1 (9–8 p)	Olympique Saumur FC (5)	Les Herbiers
18:00 CET	Brélivet 86'	Report	Bouhoutt 64'	Stadium: Stade Massabielle; Referee: Steven Llewellyn

13 November 2021	US Philbertine Football (5)	0–2	Vannes OC (4)	Saint-Philbert-de-Grand-Lieu
15:00 CET		Report	N'Sondé 13' (pen.); Duclovel 49'	Stadium: Complexe Sportif des Chevrets; Referee: Gaëtan Deneuve

13 November 2021	Luçon FC (7)	0–2	Stade Lavallois (3)	Luçon
19:00 CET		Report	N'Chobi 34'; da Silva 82'	Stadium: Stade Jean de Mouzon; Referee: Lakhdar El Bedoui

13 November 2021	ESOF La Roche-sur-Yon (6)	1–4	Le Mans FC (3)	La Roche-sur-Yon
17:00 CET	Nsingi 88'	Report	Macalou 30', 45+1', 53', 63'	Stadium: Stade de Saint-André-d'Ornay; Referee: Léo Beulet

13 November 2021	USJA Carquefou (7)	0–0 (2–4 p)	US Trégunc (5)	Carquefou
18:00 CET		Report		Stadium: Stade du Moulin-Boisseau; Referee: Gabriel Henry

13 November 2021	Voltigeurs de Châteaubriant (4)	0–2	La Roche VF (5)	Châteaubriant
18:00 CET		Report	Berjon 12'; Bonnet 78'	Stadium: Stade de la Ville en Bois; Referee: Paul Garo

PD Ergué-Gabéric (6) were drawn as the team given a bye into the eighth round.

== Eighth round ==
The eighth round draw was pre-determined at the same time as the seventh-round draw. Groupings were carried forward from the seventh round, with the mainland teams travelling for overseas ties replaced by overseas teams that were travelling to the mainland.

=== Overseas ties ===
5 December 2021 (Note: Game did not take place in Guadeloupe due to violence and curfew in the territory. Instead, the game took place in mainland France a week later.)	Solidarité-Scolaire (Guadeloupe)	0–2	US Sarre-Union (5)	Bondoufle
15:00 CET		Report	Groune 55' (pen.), 63'	Stadium: Stade Robert Bobin; Referee: Guillaume Paradis

11 December 2021 (Note: Game did not take place in Martinique due to social unrest on the island. Instead, the game took place in mainland France later in December.)	Club Franciscain (Martinique)	1–2	SO Cholet (3)	Bondoufle
15:00 CET	Narcissot 25'	Report	Gameiro 18', 55'	Stadium: Stade Robert Bobin

=== Group A ===
27 November 2021	ASC Biesheim (5)	0–1	ES Thaon (5)	Biesheim
17:00 CET		Report	Comara 36' (pen.)	Stadium: Stade Municipal; Referee: Loïc Mouton

27 November 2021	FC Soleil Bischheim (6)	0–1	Nancy (2)	Bischheim
14:30 CET		Report	Simões 64'	Stadium: Parc des Sports; Referee: Marc Bollengier

28 November 2021	EF Reims Sainte-Anne Châtillons (6)	3–0	RS Magny (7)	Cormontreuil
13:30 CET	Mansouri 16', 90'; Gourch 76'	Report		Stadium: Stade Robert Pirès; Referee: Yann Gazagne

27 November 2021	FC Sarrebourg (6)	1–3	US Créteil-Lusitanos (3)	Sarrebourg
18:00 CET	Ouled 50'	Report	Araujo 72'; Belkouche 76'; Urie 90+3'	Stadium: Stade Jean-Jacques Morin; Referee: Renaud Potier

27 November 2021	Paris FC (2)	14–0	(French Guiana) CSC Cayenne	Paris 13e
18:00 CET	Name 29', 45', 53'; Diakité 56'; Diaby-Fadiga 65', 70', 78'; Alfarela 71', 77'; Guilavogui 75', 84', 87'; Laura 81', 89'	Report		Stadium: Stade Sébastien Charléty; Referee: Jérôme Miguelgorry

=== Group B ===
27 November 2021	AS Montchat Lyon (7)	0–3	Sochaux (2)	Lyon
16:00 CET		Report	Niane 6', 9'; Kitala 28'	Stadium: Stade Vuillermet; Referee: Julien Rouquette

26 November 2021	Football Bourg-en-Bresse Péronnas 01 (3)	2–3	Jura Sud Foot (4)	Bourg-en-Bresse
20:00 CET	Montiel 45'; Fleurier 63'	Report	M'Buyi 4'; Khaled 70'; Tiago 90'	Stadium: Stade Marcel-Verchère; Referee: Louis Lungeri

27 November 2021	FC Morteau-Montlebon (5)	0–2	Dijon (2)	Montlebon
14:30 CET		Report	Ecuele Manga 68'; Arlı 90+1'	Stadium: Stade Henri Schaller; Referee: Ali Djedid

27 November 2021	FC Mulhouse (5)	1–3	Lyon La Duchère (4)	Mulhouse
17:00 CET	Delbos 79'	Report	Moke 56'; Belarbi 83'; Fuss 90+6'	Stadium: Stade de l'Ill; Referee: Philippe Lucas

=== Group C ===
5 December 2021 (Note: Original tie, scheduled for 28 November, postponed due to snow.)	Hauts Lyonnais (5)	3–3 (3–2 p)	FC Bourgoin-Jallieu (5)	Pomeys
13:30 CET	Gromat 26'; Boussaïd 66', 70'	Report	Roselli 4' (pen.), 75'; Boukaka 44' (pen.)	Stadium: Stade de la Neylière; Referee: Guillaume Janin

27 November 2021	Andrézieux-Bouthéon FC (4)	3–0	Grenoble (2)	Andrézieux-Bouthéon
17:00 CET	Cabaton 23'; Mathieu 30', 86'	Report		Stadium: L'Envol Stadium; Referee: Nicolas Rainville

27 November 2021	Chambéry SF (5)	4–6	Auxerre (2)	Chambéry
15:00 CET	Fortier 15', 61'; Bennour 55'; Scarantino 88'	Report	Ben Fredj 9', 31'; Dugimont 34'; Trouillet 40'; Sinayoko 49'; Hein 81'	Stadium: Plaine De Jeux Mager; Referee: Mathieu Vernice

27 November 2021	Vénissieux FC (6)	1–1 (4–3 p)	Moulins Yzeure Foot (4)	Vénissieux
18:00 CET	Guechi 75'	Report	Pélican 3'	Stadium: Stade Laurent Gérin; Referee: Edgar Barenton

=== Group D ===
28 November 2021	JS Chemin Bas d'Avignon (7)	1–0	RCO Agde (5)	Nîmes
13:30 CET	Vincent 83' (o.g.)	Report		Stadium: Stade Jean-Bouin; Referee: Maxime Apruzzese

27 November 2021	AS Cannes (5)	1–1 (3–2 p)	Rodez (2)	Cannes
17:00 CET	Desmartin 31'	Report	David 21'	Stadium: Stade Pierre de Coubertin; Referee: Gaël Angoula

27 November 2021	ES Cannet Rocheville (5)	1–1 (4–1 p)	FC Bastia-Borgo (3)	Le Cannet
13:00 CET	Core 29'	Report	Ba 31'	Stadium: Stade Maillan; Referee: Aldric Chancioux

27 November 2021	Aubagne FC (4)	2–2 (3–4 p)	Nîmes (2)	Aubagne
16:00 CET	Benarbia 13'; Mendy 16'	Report	Ponceau 2'; Benrahou 38'	Stadium: Stade de Lattre-de-Tassigny; Referee: Aurélien Petit

=== Group E ===
27 November 2021	Bergerac Périgord FC (4)	4–0	Stade Bordelais (5)	Bergerac
18:00 CET	Fachan 8'; M'Laab 29'; Beltran 83'; Escarpit 87'	Report		Stadium: Stade de Campréal; Referee: Cédric Mouysset

27 November 2021	Canet Roussillon FC (4)	1–1 (6–7 p)	(Réunion) Saint-Denis FC	Canet-en-Roussillon
14:00 CET	Ouadoudi 54' (pen.)	Report	Simouri 43'	Stadium: Stade Saint-Michel; Referee: Eddy Rosier

27 November 2021	Toulouse Métropole FC (6)	0–0 (3–4 p)	Montauban FCTG (7)	Toulouse
18:00 CET		Report		Stadium: Stade Pierre Cahuzac; Referee: Julien Schmitt

28 November 2021	Trélissac-Antonne Périgord FC (4)	1–3	Toulouse (2)	Trélissac
13:45 CET	Luis Castro 69' (pen.)	Report	Costa 75'; Hamel 90' (o.g.); Healey 90+3'	Stadium: Stade Firmin Daudou; Referee: Arnaud Baert

=== Group F ===
27 November 2021	AC Cambrai (6)	1–4	Amiens (2)	Cambrai
18:00 CET	Martin 2'	Report	Bénet 6'; Arokodare 27'; Gene 44'; Badji 90'	Stadium: Stade de la Liberté; Referee: Cédric Dos Santos

27 November 2021	AC Amiens (5)	1–1 (1–3 p)	Entente Feignies Aulnoye FC (5)	Amiens
16:00 CET	Seck 35'	Report	Sambou 90+4'	Stadium: Stade Moulonguet; Referee: Valentin Giorgetti

27 November 2021	Calonne-Ricouart FC Cite 6 (8)	1–4	Valenciennes (2)	Avion
16:00 CET	Tahar 27'	Report	Doukouré 45' (pen.); Picouleau 57'; Guillaume 74'; Hamache 89'	Stadium: Stade François Blin; Referee: Mehdi Mokhtari

28 November 2021	RC Salouël (10)	0–3	Wasquehal Football (5)	Amiens
14:00 CET		Report	Goret 43'; Halucha 45'; Hamache 60'	Stadium: Stade de la Licorne; Referee: Geoffrey Kubler

27 November 2021	FC Chambly (3)	0–0 (4–5 p)	AS Beauvais Oise (4)	Chambly
18:00 CET		Report		Stadium: Stade des Marais; Referee: Marc Michout

=== Group G ===
27 November 2021	J3S Amilly (5)	0–5	Quevilly-Rouen (2)	Amilly
14:00 CET		Report	Padovani 19'; Nazon 21', 25'; Sidibé 62'; Ndilu 82'	Stadium: Stade Georges Clériceau; Referee: Azzedine Souifi

27 November 2021	Gazélec Ajaccio (5)	1–2	Red Star F.C. (3)	Ajaccio
18:00 CET	Khatiri 60'	Report	Durand 65', 74'	Stadium: Stade Ange Casanova; Referee: Frank Schneider

27 November 2021	ESA Linas-Montlhéry (5)	1–1 (5–4 p)	Évreux FC 27 (5)	Montlhéry
18:00 CET	Bouvil 77'	Report	Emmanuel 25'	Stadium: Stade Paul Desgouillons; Referee: Victor Petigny

28 November 2021	FC Versailles 78 (4)	1–0	AS Poissy (4)	Versailles
13:30 CET	Ibayi 76'	Report		Stadium: Stade de Montbauron; Referee: Guy Grégory Prevot

=== Group H ===
28 November 2021	US Chauvigny (5)	0–0 (4–3 p)	Le Havre (2)	Châtellerault
15:00 CET		Report		Stadium: Stade de la Montée-Rouge; Referee: Ahmed Taleb

28 November 2021	AS Chatou (6)	4–5	C'Chartres Football (4)	Poissy
13:30 CET	Sylla 1', 41', 90'; Louaisil 50' (pen.)	Report	Daniokho 9' (o.g.); Hemia 62'; Louzif 73', 86'; Archimbaud 90' (pen.)	Stadium: Stade Léo Legrange; Referee: Aurélien Saunier

27 November 2021	Stade Poitevin FC (5)	1–1 (4–3 p)	US Orléans (3)	Buxerolles
19:00 CET	Saholona 76'	Report	Diallo 77'	Stadium: Stade Michel-Amand; Referee: Pierre Retail

28 November 2021	AS Panazol (7)	1–1 (4–3 p)	Angoulême Charente FC (4)	Panazol
14:00 CET	Ouanjine 16'	Report	Diakité 75'	Stadium: Stade de Morpiènas; Referee: Alexandre Mercier

=== Group I ===
27 November 2021	Dinan-Léhon FC (5)	2–2 (5–4 p)	US Saint-Malo (4)	Lamballe
18:00 CET	Lefèbvre 20'; Coiffic 89'	Report	Iva 42'; Inzoudine 73'	Stadium: Complexe Sportif de Penthièvre; Referee: Romain Zamo

28 November 2021	US Perros-Louannec (7)	0–3	AS Vitré (4)	Perros-Guirec
14:00 CET		Report	Lebacle 40', 85'; Le Gall 71'	Stadium: Stade Yves Le Jannou; Referee: Paul Garo

27 November 2021	Guingamp (2)	1–0	Stade Briochin (3)	Guingamp
16:15 CET	Lemonnier 26'	Report		Stadium: Stade de Roudourou; Referee: Jérémy Stinat

20 November 2021	Plancoët-Arguenon FC (7)	1–3	(Mayotte) AS Jumeaux de M'zouazia	Guingamp
15:00 CET	Letonturier 52'	Report	B. Kamal 34', 42'; F. Kamal 90'	Stadium: Stade de Roudourou; Referee: Léo Beulet

=== Group J ===
26 November 2021	Les Herbiers VF (4)	1–1 (3–4 p)	Bastia (2)	Les Herbiers
19:30 CET	Grellier 34'	Report	Schur 18'	Stadium: Stade Massabielle; Referee: Bartolomeu Varela Teles

27 November 2021	PD Ergué-Gabéric (6)	1–2	Vannes OC (4)	Ergué-Gabéric
18:00 CET	Le Reste 52'	Report	Persico 30'; Daury 84'	Stadium: Stade de Lestonan; Referee: Brendan Roffet

27 November 2021	Stade Lavallois (3)	1–1 (7–6 p)	Le Mans FC (3)	Laval
14:00 CET	Gonçalves 24'	Report	Donisa 40'	Stadium: Stade Francis Le Basser; Referee: Benjamin Lepaysant

28 November 2021	US Trégunc (5)	0–3	La Roche VF (5)	Trégunc
14:30 CET		Report	Minaud 14'; Charrier 47', 90'	Stadium: Stade de La Pinède; Referee: Lakhdar El Bedoui

== Round of 64 ==
The round of 64 draw was made on 29 November 2021, with teams divided into four groups by geography and to ensure the groups were balanced in terms of the levels of the teams.

=== Group A ===
19 December 2021	Bordeaux (1)	10–0	(Mayotte) AS Jumeaux de M'zouazia	Bordeaux
18:20 CET	Medioub 10'; Niang 28', 45+1', 53', 65'; Pembélé 50', 62'; Dilrosun 59'; Sissokho 70'; Maja 77'	Report		Stadium: Matmut Atlantique; Referee: Stéphanie Frappart

18 December 2021	AS Panazol (7)	1–1 (3–4 p)	AS Vitré (4)	Limoges
13:45 CET	M'Baye 45'	Report	Laurent 38'	Stadium: Stade Saint-Lazare; Referee: Romain Delpech

19 December 2021	Wasquehal Football (5)	0–4	Vannes OC (4)	Croix
16:00 CET		Report	Persico 11', 45+2'; Kouassi 24'; Ebrard 90+2'	Stadium: Stade Henri Seigneur; Referee: Guillaume Paradis

19 December 2021	ESA Linas-Montlhéry (5)	2–0	Angers (1)	Montlhéry
16:00 CET	Leno 10', 24'	Report		Stadium: Stade Paul Desgouillons; Referee: Ruddy Buquet

18 December 2021	Rennes (1)	1–0	Lorient (1)	Rennes
21:00 CET	Omari 21'	Report		Stadium: Roazhon Park; Attendance: 19,636; Referee: Amaury Delerue fr

18 December 2021	Quevilly-Rouen (2)	1–1 (4–2 p)	Stade Lavallois (3)	Le Petit-Quevilly
18:30 CET	Nazon 72'	Report	Maggiotti 16'	Stadium: Stade Robert Diochon; Referee: Antony Gautier

19 December 2021	Dinan-Léhon FC (5)	0–0 (12–13 p)	Brest (1)	Saint-Brieuc
18:20 CET		Report		Stadium: Stade Fred-Aubert; Referee: Benjamin Lepaysant

18 December 2021	Guingamp (2)	2–3	Amiens (2)	Guingamp
16:00 CET	Livolant 63'; Gomis 73'	Report	Akolo 20', 45+1', 55'	Stadium: Stade de Roudourou; Referee: Romain Lissorgue

=== Group B ===
18 December 2021	Toulouse (2)	4–1	Nîmes (2)	Toulouse
13:45 CET	Onaiwu 35', 45'; Healey 70'; Ratão 73'	Report	Doucouré 15'	Stadium: Stadium de Toulouse; Attendance: 7,059; Referee: Thomas Léonard (fr)

19 December 2021	US Chauvigny (5)	2–1	C'Chartres Football (4)	Châtellerault
18:20 CET	Ayadi 45'; Nsiete 49'	Report	Hernia 76'	Stadium: Stade de la Montée Rouge; Referee: Bartolomeu Varela (fr)

17 December 2021	Paris FC (2)	Abandoned (Note: Match abandoned after half time with score 1–1 due to crowd trouble. On 27 December 2021, the French Football Federation announced that both Paris FC and Lyon were disqualified from the cup, with Paris FC playing their next five home matches outside of their Stade Charléty home ground.)	Lyon (1)	Paris 13e
21:00 CET				Stadium: Stade Sébastien Charléty; Attendance: 15,717; Referee: Jérémy Stinat

19 December 2021	Montauban FCTG (7)	1–2	La Roche VF (5)	Montauban
18:20 CET	Feltin 62'	Report	Berjon 88'; Billet 90+2'	Stadium: Stade Sapiac; Referee: Floris Aubin

19 December 2021	SO Cholet (3)	0–1	Nice (1)	Cholet
18:20 CET		Report	Delort 63'	Stadium: Stade Omnisports Jean Bouin; Attendance: 4,000; Referee: Bastien Dechepy

19 December 2021	Stade Poitevin FC (5)	0–1	Lens (1)	Buxerolles
13:45 CET		Report	Ganago 36'	Stadium: Stade Michel-Amand; Attendance: 4,876; Referee: Jérôme Miguelgorry

18 December 2021	JS Chemin Bas d'Avignon (7)	0–4	Clermont (1)	Nîmes
16:00 CET		Report	Tell 32' (pen.), 58' (pen.); Khaoui 34'; Iglesias 42'	Stadium: Stade des Costières; Referee: Mathieu Vernice

19 December 2021	Bergerac Périgord FC (4)	0–0 (5–4 p)	Metz (1)	Bergerac
13:45 CET		Report		Stadium: Stade Gaston Simounet; Attendance: 3,500; Referee: Nicolas Rainville (fr)
	Penalties
	Fachan (penalty scored); Escarpit (penalty scored); Ducros (penalty scored); Mingoua (penalty scored); M'Laab (penalty scored)		(penalty scored) Niane; (penalty missed) Sarr; (penalty scored) Yade; (penalty scored) Jemerson; (penalty scored) Boulaya

=== Group C ===
19 December 2021	Red Star (3)	0–2	Monaco (1)	Saint-Ouen-sur-Seine
13:45 CET		Report	Ben Yedder 33', 65'	Stadium: Stade Bauer; Attendance: 2,670; Referee: François Letexier

18 December 2021	Sochaux (2)	0–0 (4–5 p)	Nantes (1)	Montbéliard
16:00 CET		Report		Stadium: Stade Auguste Bonal; Attendance: 8,001; Referee: Benoît Bastien
	Penalties
	Faraj (penalty scored); Viltard (penalty scored); Do Couto (penalty scored); Senaya (penalty scored); Diedhiou (penalty missed)		(penalty scored) Pereira de Sa; (penalty scored) Moutoussamy; (penalty scored) Corchia; (penalty scored) Coco; (penalty scored) Pallois

18 December 2021	Hauts Lyonnais (5)	1–3	Bastia (2)	Feurs
13:45 CET	Boussaïd 57'	Report	Sainati 5'; Le Cardinal 34'; Saadi 45+1'	Stadium: Stade Maurice Rousson; Referee: Abdelatif Kherradji

19 December 2021	Lyon La Duchère (4)	0–1	Saint-Étienne (1)	Lyon
13:45 CET		Report	Nordin 32'	Stadium: Stade de Balmont; Attendance: 3,500; Referee: Benoît Millot

19 December 2021	Andrézieux-Bouthéon FC (4)	0–1	Montpellier (1)	Andrézieux-Bouthéon
16:00 CET		Report	Savanier 68' (pen.)	Stadium: Stade Envol Stadium; Referee: Clément Turpin

18 December 2021	AS Cannes (5)	1–1 (3–2 p)	Dijon (2)	Cannes
18:30 CET	Gonçalves 74'	Report	Le Bihan 48'	Stadium: Stade Pierre de Coubertin; Referee: Arnaud Baert

18 December 2021	Jura Sud Foot (4)	5–2	(Réunion) Saint-Denis FC	Lavans-lès-Saint-Claude
16:00 CET	M'Buyi 9', 34'; Faucher 43'; Kasong Yav 50'; Khaled 73'	Report	Assoumani 45+2'; Rakontondraibe 89'	Stadium: Stade Municipal de Moirans; Referee: Frank Schneider (fr)

19 December 2021	Marseille (1)	4–1	ES Cannet Rocheville (5)	Marseille (Note: Tie reversed after ES Cannet Rocheville were unable to provide a stadium. Requests to play in Cannes were rejected due to security concerns.)
13:45 CET	Milik 41' (pen.), 58', 90'; Henrique 77'	Report	Core 16'	Stadium: Stade Vélodrome; Attendance: 21,538; Referee: Johan Hamel

=== Group D ===
19 December 2021	Entente Feignies Aulnoye FC (5)	0–3	Paris Saint-Germain (1)	Valenciennes
21:10 CET		Report	Mbappé 16' (pen.), 51'; Icardi 31' (pen.)	Stadium: Stade du Hainaut; Attendance: 25,000; Referee: Florent Batta

18 December 2021	ES Thaon (5)	3–3 (4–2 p)	AS Beauvais Oise (4)	Capavenir-Vosges
18:30 CET	Dufour 16'; Rother 44', 90+4'	Report	Faupala 18' (pen.); Irie Bi 63' (pen.); Soukouna 80'	Stadium: Stade Robert Sayer; Referee: Mehdi Mokhtari

18 December 2021	Lille (1)	3–1	Auxerre (2)	Villeneuve d'Ascq
18:30 CET	Gomes 23'; David 33'; Çelik 39'	Report	Dugimont 48'	Stadium: Stade Pierre-Mauroy; Attendance: 12,093; Referee: Eric Wattellier

18 December 2021	US Créteil-Lusitanos (3)	3–0	Vénissieux FC (6)	Créteil (Note: Tie reversed after Vénissieux FC were unable to provide a stadium.)
16:00 CET	Araujo 19', 54'; Diarra 62'	Report		Stadium: Stade Dominique Duvauchelle; Referee: Alexandre Perreau Niel

18 December 2021	Troyes (1)	1–1 (2–4 p)	Nancy (2)	Troyes
13:45 CET	Domingues 44' (pen.)	Report	Jung 64'	Stadium: Stade de l'Aube; Attendance: 2,916; Referee: Willy Delajod
	Penalties
	Rami (penalty scored); Suk Hyun-jun (penalty missed); Domingues (penalty scored); Larouci (penalty missed)		(penalty scored) Jung; (penalty scored) El Aynaoui; (penalty scored) Haag; (penalty scored) Bondo

19 December 2021	EF Reims Sainte-Anne Châtillons (6)	0–1	Reims (1)	Reims
16:00 CET		Report	Adeline 89'	Stadium: Stade Auguste Delaune; Attendance: 6,067; Referee: Jérôme Brisard

16 December 2021	Valenciennes (2)	0–1	Strasbourg (1)	Valenciennes
21:00 CET		Report	Diallo 15'	Stadium: Stade du Hainaut; Attendance: 7,572; Referee: Olivier Thual (fr)

18 December 2021	US Sarre-Union (5)	0–1	FC Versailles 78 (4)	Sarre-Union
13:45 CET		Report	Djoco 27'	Stadium: Stade Omnisports; Referee: Aurélien Petit

== Round of 32 ==
The round of 32 draw was made on 19 December 2021. This was an open draw.

Nice (1)	— (Note: Nice were due to meet either Paris FC or Lyon in the round of 32, but their round of 64 match was abandoned after half time due to crowd trouble; as a result of the disqualification of both teams, Nice were awarded a bye to the round of 16.)	Bye

2 January 2022	Cannes (5)	0–1	Toulouse (2)	Cannes
13:45 CET		Report	Ratão 52'	Stadium: Stade Pierre de Coubertin; Attendance: 5,400; Referee: Romain Lissorgue

2 January 2022	ESA Linas-Montlhéry (5)	3–3 (3–4 p)	Amiens (2)	Montlhéry
18:30 CET	Bouvil 64', 70'; Sylla 90+2'	Report	Gnahoré 48'; Akolo 50'; Lahne 53'	Stadium: Stade Paul Desgouillon; Attendance: 1,500; Referee: Florent Batta
	Penalties
	Roca (penalty scored); Duval (penalty scored); Ngeyitala (penalty scored); Tchabo (penalty missed); Bouvil (penalty missed)		(penalty scored) Lachuer; (penalty scored) Zungu; (penalty scored) Sy; (penalty scored) Traoré

2 January 2022	Bergerac Périgord FC (4)	0–0 (5–4 p)	US Créteil-Lusitanos (3)	Bergerac
16:00 CET		Report		Stadium: Stade Gaston Simounet; Attendance: 3,500; Referee: Johan Hamel
	Penalties
	Fachan (penalty scored); Escarpit (penalty scored); Ducros (penalty scored); Mingoua (penalty scored); M'Laab (penalty scored)		(penalty scored) Farade; (penalty scored) Pereira; (penalty scored) Aouladzian; (penalty scored) Urie; (penalty missed) Chergui

2 January 2022	Nancy (2)	1–1 (4–3 p)	Rennes (1)	Tomblaine
16:00 CET	Biron 78'	Report	Doku 58'	Stadium: Stade Marcel Picot; Attendance: 5,000; Referee: Antony Gautier (fr)
	Penalties
	Bondo (penalty scored); Biron (penalty missed); Triboulet (penalty scored); Bertrand (penalty scored); Simões (penalty missed); Delos (penalty scored)		(penalty missed) Laborde; (penalty scored) Majer; (penalty scored) Martin; (penalty missed) Tel; (penalty scored) Santamaria; (penalty missed) Badé

2 January 2022	FC Versailles 78 (4)	4–0	La Roche VF (5)	Versailles
13:45 CET	Ibayi 8', 12'; Traoré 26'; Diouf 26'	Report		Stadium: Stade de Montbauron; Attendance: 1,900; Referee: Thomas Léonard (fr)

2 January 2022	Brest (1)	3–0	Bordeaux (1)	Brest
13:45 CET	Mounié 36' (pen.); Faivre 81' (pen.); Le Douaron 90+4'	Report		Stadium: Stade Francis-Le Blé; Attendance: 4,039; Referee: Ruddy Buquet

2 January 2022	US Chauvigny (5)	0–3	Marseille (1)	Limoges
21:00 CET		Report	Milik 29'; Ünder 41'; Harit 80'	Stadium: Stade Municipal de Beaublanc; Attendance: 8,000; Referee: Jérôme Brisard

2 January 2022	Bastia (2)	2–0	Clermont (1)	Furiani
16:00 CET	Santelli 25'; Robic 70'	Report		Stadium: Stade Armand-Cesari; Attendance: 7,000; Referee: Pierre Gaillouste

2 January 2022	ES Thaon (5)	0–1	Reims (1)	Capavenir-Vosges
18:30 CET		Report	Hornby 90+3'	Stadium: Stade Robert Sayer; Attendance: 2,500; Referee: Clément Turpin

2 January 2022	Jura Sud Foot (4)	1–4	Saint-Étienne (1)	Louhans
18:30 CET	Tiago 78'	Report	Nadé 7'; Nordin 13'; Sako 82' (pen.); Boudebouz 86'	Stadium: Stade du Bram; Attendance: 5,500; Referee: Bastien Dechepy

2 January 2022	Montpellier (1)	1–0	Strasbourg (1)	Montpellier
16:00 CET	Ristić 20'	Report		Stadium: Stade de la Mosson; Attendance: 4,575; Referee: Amaury Delerue (fr)

2 January 2022	Quevilly-Rouen (2)	1–3	Monaco (1)	Le Petit-Quevilly
18:30 CET	Sidibé 43'	Report	Ben Yedder 33' (pen.); Volland 37', 58'	Stadium: Stade Robert Diochon; Attendance: 7,826; Referee: Stéphanie Frappart

3 January 2022	Vannes OC (4)	0–4	Paris Saint-Germain (1)	Vannes
21:10 CET		Report	Kimpembe 28'; Mbappé 59', 71', 76'	Stadium: Stade de la Rabine; Attendance: 5,000; Referee: Jérémy Stinat

2 January 2022	Nantes (1)	2–0	AS Vitré (4)	Nantes (Note: Tie reversed due to AS Vitré not being able to provide a stadium of the required standard.)
13:45 CET	Blas 25'; Geubbels 67'	Report		Stadium: Stade de la Beaujoire; Attendance: 9,555; Referee: Eric Wattellier

4 January 2022	Lens (1)	2–2 (4–3 p)	Lille (1)	Lens
21:00 CET	Fofana 67', 90+5'	Report	Onana 28', 33'	Stadium: Stade Bollaert-Delelis; Attendance: 5,000; Referee: Willy Delajod
	Penalties
	Saïd (penalty scored); Kakuta (penalty scored); Jean (penalty scored); Clauss (penalty missed); Fofana (penalty scored)		(penalty scored) Bamba; (penalty missed) Fonte; (penalty scored) Botman; (penalty scored) Pied; (penalty missed) Sanches

== Round of 16 ==
The round of 16 draw was made on 4 January 2022. This was an open draw.

29 January 2022	Toulouse (2)	0–1	FC Versailles 78 (4)	Toulouse (Note: Tie reversed due to FC Versailles 78 not being able to provide a suitable stadium.)
16:15 CET (UTC+1)		Report	Djoco 79'	Stadium: Stadium de Toulouse; Attendance: 4,678; Referee: Jérémy Stinat

30 January 2022	Bergerac Périgord FC (4)	1–0	Saint-Étienne (1)	Périgueux
18:30 CET (UTC+1)	Escarpit 76'	Report		Stadium: Stade Francis-Rongiéras; Attendance: 3,676; Referee: Florent Batta

29 January 2022	Marseille (1)	1–1 (5–4 p)	Montpellier (1)	Marseille
21:00 CET (UTC+1)	Milik 74'	Report	Makouana 80'	Stadium: Stade Vélodrome; Attendance: 5,000; Referee: Benoît Millot
	Penalties
	Rongier (penalty scored); Milik (penalty scored); Ünder (penalty scored); Guendouzi (penalty scored); Payet (penalty scored)		(penalty scored) Sakho; (penalty missed) Ristić; (penalty scored) Leroy; (penalty scored) Delaye; (penalty scored) Chotard

31 January 2022	Paris Saint-Germain (1)	0–0 (5–6 p)	Nice (1)	Paris
21:15 CET (UTC+1)		Report		Stadium: Parc des Princes; Attendance: 5,000; Referee: Jérémie Pignard
	Penalties
	Messi (penalty scored); Mbappé (penalty scored); Paredes (penalty missed); Draxler (penalty scored); Verratti (penalty scored); Bernat (penalty scored); Simons (penalty missed)		(penalty scored) Schneiderlin; (penalty scored) Todibo; (penalty scored) Atal; (penalty missed) Delort; (penalty scored) Gouiri; (penalty scored) Guessand; (penalty scored) Dante

29 January 2022	Nancy (2)	0–2	Amiens (2)	Tomblaine
16:15 CET (UTC+1)		Report	Lusamba 15'; Arokodare 38'	Stadium: Stade Marcel Picot; Attendance: 5,000; Referee: Bastien Dechepy

30 January 2022	Lens (1)	2–4	Monaco (1)	Lens
21:00 CET (UTC+1)	Saïd 45'; Kalimuendo 53'	Report	Ben Yedder 18', 88'; Jean Lucas 27'; Diop 29'	Stadium: Stade Bollaert-Delelis; Attendance: 5,000; Referee: Eric Wattellier

29 January 2022	Reims (1)	1–1 (3–5 p)	Bastia (2)	Reims
18:30 CET (UTC+1)	Ekitike 37'	Report	Salles-Lamonge 71'	Stadium: Stade Auguste-Delaune; Attendance: 5,000; Referee: Stéphanie Frappart
	Penalties
	Ekitike (penalty scored); Hornby (penalty scored); Gravillon (penalty missed); Mbuku (penalty scored)		(penalty scored) Taoui; (penalty scored) Bocognano; (penalty scored) Vincent; (penalty scored) Magri; (penalty scored) Santelli

28 January 2022	Nantes (1)	2–0	Brest (1)	Nantes
21:00 CET (UTC+1)	Blas 25', 53'	Report		Stadium: Stade de la Beaujoire; Attendance: 5,000; Referee: Benoît Bastien

== Quarter-finals ==
The quarter-finals draw was made on 31 January 2022. This was an open draw.

8 February 2022	Monaco (1)	2–0	Amiens (2)	Monaco
21:00 CET (UTC+1)	Tchouaméni 5'; Volland 54'	Report		Stadium: Stade Louis II; Attendance: 2,128; Referee: Amaury Delerue

9 February 2022	Bergerac Périgord FC (4)	1–1 (4–5 p)	FC Versailles 78 (4)	Périgueux
18:30 CET (UTC+1)	Tressens 89'	Report	Diarrassouba 14'	Stadium: Stade Francis-Rongiéras; Attendance: 6,000; Referee: Jérôme Brisard
	Penalties
	Fachan (penalty scored); Escarpit (penalty scored); Ducros (penalty scored); Mingoua (penalty missed); Sahibeddine (penalty scored)		(penalty scored) Vieira; (penalty scored) Traoré; (penalty scored) Brun; (penalty scored) Diarrassouba; (penalty scored) Diouf

9 February 2022	Nice (1)	4–1	Marseille (1)	Nice
21:15 CET (UTC+1)	Gouiri 10'; Kluivert 29', 49'; Delort 61'	Report	Bard 3' (o.g.)	Stadium: Allianz Riviera; Attendance: 33,346; Referee: Ruddy Buquet

10 February 2022	Nantes (1)	2–0	Bastia (2)	Nantes
21:00 CET (UTC+1)	Blas 3' (pen.); Kolo Muani 71'	Report		Stadium: Stade de la Beaujoire; Attendance: 24,862; Referee: Antony Gautier

== Semi-finals ==
The semi-finals draw was made on 10 February 2022. This was an open draw.

1 March 2022	Nice (1)	2–0	FC Versailles 78 (4)	Nice (Note: Tie reversed due to FC Versailles 78 not being able to provide a suitable stadium.)
21:00 CET (UTC+1)	Gouiri 48'; Dolberg 73'	Report		Stadium: Allianz Riviera; Attendance: 26,723; Referee: François Letexier

2 March 2022	Nantes (1)	2–2 (4–2 p)	Monaco (1)	Nantes
21:15 CET (UTC+1)	Sidibé 21' (o.g.); Moutoussamy 74'	Report	Maripán 12'; Boadu 76'	Stadium: Stade de la Beaujoire; Attendance: 33,929; Referee: Benoît Bastien
	Penalties
	Kolo Muani (penalty scored); Merlin (penalty scored); Moutoussamy (penalty scored); Simon (penalty scored)		(penalty missed) Ben Yedder; (penalty scored) Disasi; (penalty missed) Tchouaméni; (penalty scored) Volland

== Final ==
7 May 2022
21:00 CEST

Nice	0–1	Nantes
	Report	Blas 47' (pen.)

Stade de France, Saint-Denis
Attendance: 78,961
Referee: Stéphanie Frappart
