= 2021–22 Coupe de France preliminary rounds, Occitanie =

The 2021–22 Coupe de France preliminary rounds, Occitanie was the qualifying competition to decide which teams from the leagues of the Occitanie region of France took part in the main competition from the seventh round.

A total of ten teams qualified from the Occitanie preliminary rounds. In 2020–21, Canet Roussillon FC progressed furthest in the competition, reaching the quarter-finals, beating Marseille along the way, before losing to Montpellier.

== Draws and fixtures ==
On 9 July 2021, the league announced that 509 teams had entered from the region. On 23 July 2021, the draw for the first two rounds was published. As in previous seasons, the draw for these rounds was made within individual districts of the league, with a few teams being drawn out of district to ensure a balanced draw. 424 teams entered at the first round stage, from the District leagues and Régional 3. A further 66 teams from Régional 2 and Régional 1 entered at the second round stage. The third round draw, which saw the entry of the Championnat National 3 teams from the region, was published on 17 September 2021. The fourth round draw, which saw the entry of the Championnat National 2 teams, was published on 23 September 2021. The fifth round draw, which saw the entry of the single Championnat National team in the region, was made on 6 October 2021. The sixth round draw was published on 20 October 2021.

=== First round ===
These matches are from the Ariège district, and were played on 28 and 29 August 2021.

First round results: Occitanie (Ariège)
Tie no	Home team (tier)	Score	Away team (tier)
1.	AS Rieux-de-Pelleport (9)	0–3	FC Pamiers (8)
2.	ES Fossatoise (8)	0–0 (1–4 p) (Note: Tie reversed from original draw.)	FC Saint-Girons (8)
3.	FC Lézat (10)	2–2 (3–2 p)	US Tarascon (9)
4.	AS Plantaurel (11)	0–4	EN Mazères (9)
5.	FC Saverdun (8)	10–2	FC Coussa-Hers (9)
6.	FC Cerdagne-Font-Romeu-Capcir (Note: FC Cerdagne-Font-Romeu-Capcir are from the Pyrénées-Orientales district.) (10)	3–0 (Note: Tie won by means of forfeit.)	FC Pays d'Olmes (9)
7.	Entente La Varilhoise Saint-Jean-de-Verge (9)	1–10	ES Saint-Jean-du-Falga (9)
8.	FC Mirepoix 09 (9)	2–2 (4–3 p)	US Montaut (10)

These matches are from the Aude district, and were played on 29 August 2021.

First round results: Occitanie (Aude)
Tie no	Home team (tier)	Score	Away team (tier)
1.	FC Alaric-Puichéric (10)	2–3	UFC Narbonne (9)
2.	US Belpech (10)	2–2 (7–6 p)	FC Malepère (10)
3.	FC Caux-et-Sauzens (10)	1–0	US Villasavary (11)
4.	ES Arzens (12)	2–3	FC Chalabre (9)
5.	Trapel-Pennautier FC (10)	2–1	Olympic Cuxac-d'Aude (9)
6.	AS Bram (10)	1–6	Olympique Moussan-Montredon (8)
7.	US Salhersienne (10)	0–6	FC Briolet (8)
8.	FC Villegly (10)	3–1	AS Espéraza (11)
9.	RC Pieusse (11)	1–1 (5–4 p)	FC Corbières Méditerranée (8)
10.	AS Pexiora (9)	3–2	US Minervois (9)
11.	FC Saint-Nazairois (10)	1–5	Haut-Minervois Olympique (9)
12.	Limoux-Pieusse FC (9)	0–2	MJC Gruissan (8)
13.	Fleury FC (12)	1–0	OS Saint-Papoul (11)
14.	AJS Bages (12)	0–3	UF Lézignanais (8)
15.	ES Fanjeaux (10)	1–0	FC Villedubert (10)
16.	ES Sainte-Eulalie-Villesèquelande (9)	2–0	Razès Olympique (9)

These matches are from the Aveyron district, were played on 28 and 29 August 2021.

First round results: Occitanie (Aveyron)
Tie no	Home team (tier)	Score	Away team (tier)
1.	AO Bozouls (10)	1–1 (3–4 p)	Pareloup Céor FC (11)
2.	Entente Villecomtal-Mouret-Pruines-Entraygues (10)	1–4	Luc Primaube FC (7)
3.	US Penchot Livinhac (11)	2–2 (0–3 p)	AS Aguessac (9)
4.	Foot Rouergue (11)	1–5	US Réquistanaise (9)
5.	US Pays Alzuréen (10)	2–1	FC Monastère (8)
6.	JS Bassin Aveyron (8)	4–3	US Pays Rignacoise (9)
7.	US Bas Rouergue (9)	5–3	Ségala-Rieupeyroux-Salvetat (8)
8.	Inter du Causse Bezonnes (11)	1–2	AS Vabraise (10)
9.	Stade Villefranchois (9)	6–1	FC Agen-Gages (10)
10.	Sport Saint Serninois (12)	3–0 (Note: Tie won by means of forfeit.)	Union Haut Lévézou (12)
11.	Ouest Aveyron Football (9)	1–2	Espoir FC 88 (8)
12.	Méridienne d'Olt FC (10)	2–0	FC Saint-Juéry (11)
13.	Entente Costecalde Lestrade Broquiès (11)	1–5	Entente Saint-Georges/Saint-Rome (9)
14.	Olympique Martiel (13)	0–3	US Argence/Viadène (10)
15.	US Tournemire-Roquefort (12)	2–0	Essor de Boussac (11)
16.	SO Millau (9)	3–1	US Espalion (8)
17.	AS Saint-Geniez-d'Olt (11)	2–6	Stade Saint-Affricain (8)
18.	JS Lévézou (10)	1–3	FC Naucellois (8)
19.	Association Saint-Laurentaise Cantonale Canourguaise (10)	2–0	Entente Salles Curan/Curan (8)
20.	AS Soulages-Bonneval (11)	2–7	FC Comtal (8)

These matches are from the Gard-Lozère district, and were played on 27, 28 and 29 August 2021.

First round results: Occitanie (Gard-Lozère)
Tie no	Home team (tier)	Score	Away team (tier)
1.	AS Chastelloise (12)	0–2	CA Bessegeoise (10)
2.	AS Randonnaise (13)	0–8	Valdonnez FC (11)
3.	ES Rimeize (13)	0–10	ESC Le Buisson (10)
4.	US Saint-Germanaise (13)	0–3	AS Le Malzieu (12)
5.	AS Badaroux (12)	2–2 (8–7 p)	Marvejols Sports (10)
6.	ASC Le Refuge (11)	1–0	Vaillante Aumonaise (12)
7.	ES Barjac (10)	3–0 (Note: Tie won by means of forfeit.)	AS Saint-Paulet-de-Caisson (10)
8.	EF Vézénobres Cruviers (10)	1–1 (4–2 p)	AS Caissargues (10)
9.	AEC Saint-Gilles (9)	3–0	FC Cévennes (10)
10.	OC Redessan (9)	1–3	SC Anduzien (7)
11.	SC Saint-Martin-de-Valgalgues (11)	5–1	AS Saint-Privat-des-Vieux (9)
12.	RC Saint-Laurent-des-Arbres (11)	1–6	OC Bellegarde (10)
13.	FC Bagnols Escanaux (12)	0–0 (2–3 p)	Omnisports Saint-Hilaire-La Jasse (10)
14.	ES Marguerittes (9)	1–1 (2–4 p)	CO Soleil Levant Nîmes (7)
15.	ES Grau-du-Roi (8)	4–2	ES Suménoise (9)
16.	US La Regordane (10)	0–4	Olympique Saintois (9)
17.	US Garons (10)	3–0	FC Cabassut (11)
18.	FC Val de Cèze (9)	1–4	AS Nîmes Athletic (9)
19.	US Monoblet (9)	0–8	FC Chusclan-Laudun-l'Ardoise (8)
20.	ES Trois Moulins (9)	0–3	FC Langlade (10)
21.	FC Vatan (13)	1–10	RC Générac (9)
22.	SA Cigalois (10)	5–2	SC Manduellois (10)
23.	US Pujaut (11)	4–1	ES Rochefort Signargues (11)
24.	FC Moussac (11)	3–0	EJ Pays Grand Combien (12)
25.	GC Quissac (11)	1–5	US Trèfle (8)
26.	AS Beauvoisin (11)	1–3	Entente Perrier Vergèze (7)
27.	Olympique Fourquésien (11)	2–3	EFC Beaucairois (10)
28.	AS Versoise (12)	2–7	AS Poulx (9)
29.	AS Saint-Christol-lès-Alès (10)	2–1	FCO Domessargues (11)

These matches are from the Haute-Garonne district, and were played on 28 and 29 August 2021.

First round results: Occitanie (Haute-Garonne)
Tie no	Home team (tier)	Score	Away team (tier)
1.	AS Toulouse Lardenne (11)	0–2	US Pouvourville (7)
2.	RC Muret (12)	0–4	Roques-Confluent Lacroix/Saubens/Pinsaguel (10)
3.	Pointis-Inard OC (12)	2–5	Montastruc-de-Salies FC (10)
4.	Bruguières SC (11)	0–3 (Note: Tie won by means of forfeit.)	JS Cintegabelle (8)
5.	FC Roquettois (12)	9–1	US Ramonville (10)
6.	ERCSO L'Isle-en-Dodon (9)	2–4	JE Toulousaine Croix-Daurade (9)
7.	UA Fenouillet (8)	1–3	Comminges Saint-Gaudens (7)
8.	AS Mondonville (10)	1–0	AS Flourens Drémil-Lafage (11)
9.	Lauragais FC (10)	0–3	Toulouse Rangueil FC (8)
10.	FC Autan (13)	1–2	Lagardelle Miremont Sports (11)
11.	US Bérat (11)	1–6	JS Cugnaux (8)
12.	Entente Naurouze-Labastide (Note: Entente Naurouze-Labastide are from the Aude district.) (9)	2–1	Pyrénées Sud Comminges (10)
13.	(Spain) UE Bossòst (10)	2–2 (2–4 p)	US Encausse-Soueich-Ganties (9)
14.	Grenade FC (10)	5–1	AS Lavernose-Lherm-Mauzac (8)
15.	FC Bagatelle (11)	1–5	ES Saint-Simon (8)
16.	FC Labarthe-Rivière (11)	1–2	FC Canal Nord (11)
17.	AS Villemur (10)	3–1	JS Auzielle Lauzerville (11)
18.	Toulouse Foot Compans Caffarelli (9)	2–2 (5–4 p)	FC Eaunes/Labarthe-sur-Lèze (8)
19.	EF Castelmaurou Verfeil (10)	2–1	Saint-Lys Olympique FC (10)
20.	AS Hersoise (11)	2–4	Toulouse Cheminots Marengo Sports (12)
21.	Football Algérien Toulousain (12)	1–2	Entente Boulogne-Péguilhan (7)
22.	US Bouloc Saint-Sauveur (12)	1–1 (4–2 p)	Toulouse ACF (10)
23.	FC Beauzelle (8)	3–0 (Note: Tie reversed from original draw.)	Toulouse Kangaroos FC (13)
24.	AS Montmaurin (11)	0–2	JS Toulouse Pradettes (8)
25.	US Castelginest (8)	4–0	Toulouse Olympique Aviation Club (9)
26.	US Léguevin (8)	1–0	Baziège OC (8)
27.	FC Launaguet (8)	0–0 (2–4 p)	JS Carbonne (8)
28.	US Riveraine (11)	0–2	JS Brax (10)
29.	Toulouse Football Sud (12)	1–3	EFC Aurignac (10)
30.	AS La Faourette (12)	2–3	Entente Landorthe-Labarthe-Estancarbon-Savarthès (9)
31.	FC Quint-Fonsegrives (13)	3–1	Fontenilles FC (11)
32.	ES Saint-Hilaire (11)	0–2	AS Castelnau-d'Estrétefonds (8)
33.	US Sainte-Foy Football (12)	2–2 (3–4 p)	ÉF Montjoire-La Magdelaine (13)
34.	AS Toulouse Mirail (10)	0–2	FC Mabroc (8)

These matches are from the Gers district, and were played on 27, 28 and 29 August 2021.

First round results: Occitanie (Gers)
Tie no	Home team (tier)	Score	Away team (tier)
1.	FC Castéra-Verduzan (9)	2–1	JS Tougetoise (8)
2.	Sud Astarac 2010 (8)	1–3	FC Pavien (8)
3.	AO Cornebarrieu (Note: AO Cornebarrieu are from the Haute-Garonne district.) (10)	1–0	AS Pujaudran (11)
4.	Eauze FC (9)	2–2 (2–4 p)	FC Mirandais (9)
5.	US Aignanais (9)	4–1	Sainte-Christie-Preignan AS (9)
6.	FC L'Islois (8)	8–0	Cologne FC (9)
7.	Rassemblement Bas Armangnac FC (10)	9–2	AS Monferran-Savès (10)
8.	SC Solomiac (10)	0–4	ES Gimontoise (9)
9.	SC Saint-Clar (9)	1–3	Forza Labéjan-Saint-Jean-le-Comtal (9)
10.	US Aubiet (9)	4–1	UA Vic-Fezensac (9)
11.	Mauvezin FC (10)	1–4	AS Manciet (9)
12.	US Duran (10)	2–0	AS Ségoufielle (10)

These matches are from the Hérault district, and were played on 28 and 29 August 2021.

First round results: Occitanie (Hérault)
Tie no	Home team (tier)	Score	Away team (tier)
1.	AS Canétoise (10)	0–1	US Pougetoise (11)
2.	ROC Social Sète (10)	0–3 (Note: Tie won by means of forfeit.)	FCO Valras-Serignan (9)
3.	RC Lemasson Montpellier (11)	3–2	ASPTT Lunel (12)
4.	FC Maurin (11)	1–3	US Villeveyracoise (12)
5.	ES Cazouls-Marauusan-Maureilham (10)	2–2 (3–4 p)	FC Lamalou-les-Bains (11)
6.	AS Mireval (11)	0–2	RS Gigeannais (10)
7.	SC Lodève (13)	4–1 (Note: Match was abandoned at the start of the second half, due to AS Saint-Martin Montpellier not having enough players present for the kick-off. AS Saint-Martin Montpellier judged to have forfeited the tie. However, SC Lodève also found to have fielded a player (who was formerly president of the club) who was suspended from football. SC Lodève penalised. Neither side qualify.)	AS Saint-Martin Montpellier (11)
8.	US Basses Cévennes (12)	1–5	ES Pérols (8)
9.	AS Valerguoise (11)	1–2	SC Saint-Thibérien (9)
10.	AS Bessanaise (11)	3–1	FC Villeneuve-lès-Béziers (12)
11.	Jacou Clapiers FA (10)	3–0	FC Pradéen (11)
12.	AC Alignanais (10)	1–8	Mèze Stade FC (8)
13.	AS Atlas Paillade (7)	3–2	Baillargues-Saint-Brès-Valergues (8)
14.	US Villeneuvoise (12)	4–1	US Grabels (11)
15.	ASPTT Montpellier (12)	3–9	US Mauguio Carnon (8)
16.	AS Saint-Mathieu-de-Tréviers (10)	0–3	AS Gignacois (8)
17.	Olympique Saint-André-de-Sangonis (8)	3–2	USO Florensac-Pinet (9)
18.	Olympique Midi Lirou Capestang-Poilhes (11)	1–4	Entente Corneilhan-Lignan (9)
19.	FC Thongue et Libron (11)	3–0	ES Coeur Hérault (11)
20.	CA Poussan (11)	1–3	FC Saint-Pargoire (12)
21.	ES Grand Orb Foot (10)	4–2	Arceaux Montpellier (8)
22.	AS Pierrots Teyran (11)	0–4	AS Montarnaud-Saint-Paul-Vaihauques-Murviel (8)
23.	Stade Montblanais (12)	1–3	Pointe Courte AC Sète (10)
24.	RC Neffiès Roujan (13)	1–8	US Montagnacoise (8)
25.	OF Thézan-Saint-Geniès (12)	1–11	AS Puissalicon-Magalas (9)
26.	US Colombiers Nissan Méditerranée Via Domitia (12)	1–2	FC Sauvian (13)
27.	AS Juvignac (10)	1–2	Aurore Saint-Gilloise (9)
28.	FC Sussargues-Berange (10)	3–6	FC Petit Bard (7)
29.	Bouzigues-Loupian AC (11)	0–5	AS Pignan (8)
30.	FC Aspiranais (10)	2–4	FO Sud Hérault (8)
31.	FC Boujan (11)	1–1 (3–4 p)	Arsenal Croix d'Argent (12)
32.	RSO Cournonterral (10)	2–5	RC Vedasien (8)
33.	ES Paulhan-Pézenas (10)	3–0	Avenir Castriote (11)
34.	FCO Viassois (11)	0–4	FC Lespignan-Vendres (9)
35.	Olympique La Peyrade FC (9)	2–1	FC Lavérune (9)

These matches are from the Lot district, and were played on 28 and 29 August 2021.

First round results: Occitanie (Lot)
Tie no	Home team (tier)	Score	Away team (tier)
1.	Val Roc Foot (9)	1–1 (3–2 p)	Figeac Capdenac Quercy FC (8)
2.	Uxello FC Capdenac (11)	2–1	Puy-l'Évêque-Prayssac FC (9)
3.	US Saint-Paul-de-Loubressac (11)	0–2	Entente Cajarc Cenevières (9)
4.	Entente Ségala Foot (9)	0–1	Élan Marivalois (9)
5.	Touzac Malbec FC (12)	4–2	AS Causse Limargue (9)
6.	Lacapelle Football (10)	0–3 (Note: Tie won by means of forfeit.)	Haut Célé FC (9)
7.	FC Lalbenque-Fontanes (8)	1–2	ES Souillac-Cressenac-Gignac (9)
8.	FC Haut Quercy (10)	1–0	CL Cuzance (11)
9.	AS Montcabrier (9)	3–0	ES Saint-Germain (10)
10.	US3C Catus (10)	1–2	Entente Bleuets Lendou-Saint-Cyprien-Montcuq (10)
11.	FC Bégoux Arcambal (12)	5–1	FC Gréalou (10)

These matches are from the Hautes-Pyrénées district, and were played on 27, 28 and 29 August 2021.

First round results: Occitanie (Hautes-Pyrénées)
Tie no	Home team (tier)	Score	Away team (tier)
1.	FC Val d'Adour (9)	1–1 (4–1 p)	FC Plateau-Lannezman (9)
2.	FC Pyrénées/Vallées des Gaves (8)	0–1	ASC Barbazan-Debat (9)
3.	US Côteaux (9)	1–1 (3–4 p)	Elan Pyrénéen Bazet-Bordères-Lagarde (9)
4.	ASC Aureilhan (8)	0–4	FC des Nestes (9)
5.	US Tarbais Nouvelle Vague (9)	3–0 (Note: Tie won by means of forfeit.)	FC Ibos-Ossun (10)
6.	US Marquisat Bénac (8)	2–2 (5–4 p)	Boutons d'Or Ger (8)
7.	FC Bazillac (12)	4–6	ES Haut Adour (8)
8.	Tarbes FC (9)	0–3	FC Bordes (10)
9.	Soues Cigognes FC (8)	2–1	Séméac OFC (8)
10.	Horgues-Odos FC (9)	0–6	Quand Même Orleix (8)

These matches are from the Pyrénées-Orientales district, were played on 29 August 2021.

First round results: Occitanie (Pyrénées-Orientales)
Tie no	Home team (tier)	Score	Away team (tier)
1.	Céret FC (10)	3–0	FC Villelongue (9)
2.	AS Bages (10)	– (Note: Match not played after Baho-Pézilla FC placed a challenge stating that the pitch was not correctly marked out. AS Bages penalised. Baho-Pézilla FC qualify.)	Baho-Pézilla FC (9)
3.	FC Saint-Cyprien (9)	0–5	SO Rivesaltais (8)
4.	Olympique Haut Vallespir (11)	0–3 (Note: Tie won by means of forfeit.)	Association Théza Alénya Corneilla FC (9)
5.	Saleilles OC (10)	2–2 (3–4 p)	BECE FC Vallée de l'Aigly (9)
6.	AS Prades (12)	2–4	Les Amis de Cédric Brunier (10)
7.	Salanca FC (9)	0–0 (5–6 p)	FC Thuirinois (9)
8.	FC Latour-Bas-Elne (12)	3–2	RC Perpignan Sud (10)
9.	FC Le Soler (9)	0–3	FC Laurentin (8)

These matches are from the Tarn district, and were played on 27, 28 and 29 August 2021.

First round results: Occitanie (Tarn)
Tie no	Home team (tier)	Score	Away team (tier)
1.	US Carmaux (10)	4–2	US Cadalen (10)
2.	ACS Labrespy (11)	0–8	FC Vignoble 81 (9)
3.	FC Labastide-de-Lévis (12)	1–3	AS Lagrave (10)
4.	Valence OF (10)	2–2 (5–3 p)	AS Vallée du Sor (10)
5.	Les Copains d'Abord (8)	5–3	FC Castelnau-de-Lévis (9)
6.	Lavaur FC (8)	5–0	Olympique Lautrec (9)
7.	AF Pays d'Oc 81 (9)	3–3 (3–2 p)	FC Le Garric (10)
8.	Rives du Tescou FC (11)	2–2 (3–2 p) (Note: Rives du Tescou FC penalised for fielding an ineligible player. US Cordes qualify.)	US Cordes (9)
9.	AJ Massalaise (10)	3–3 (8–7 p)	Roquecourbe FC (9)
10.	US Albi (8)	4–1	Sport Benfica Graulhet (9)
11.	Thoré FC 81 (10)	0–1	AS Giroussens (8)
12.	FC Brassac (9)	1–2	US Castres (8)
13.	US Mirandolaise (12)	0–4	La Mygale Le Séquestre Football (9)
14.	US Saint-Sulpice (7)	2–0	US Gaillacois (8)
15.	US Labruguièroise (10)	4–0	AS Pampelonnaise (10)
16.	La Cremade FC (9)	3–0 (Note: Tie reversed from original draw.) (Note: Tie won by means of forfeit.)	Arthes SL Vallée Foot XI (11)
17.	US Autan (10)	4–1	Sorèze FC (10)
18.	Cambounet FC (8)	1–1 (4–2 p)	FC Pays Mazamétain (8)

These matches are from the Tarn-et-Garonne district, and were played on 28 and 29 August 2021.

First round results: Occitanie (Tarn-et-Garonne)
Tie no	Home team (tier)	Score	Away team (tier)
1.	FC Albias (12)	1–4	Confluences FC (8)
2.	AS Stéphanoise (9)	3–0 (Note: Tie won by means of forfeit.)	AC Bastidien (9)
3.	Coquelicots Montéchois FC (9)	2–1	Espoir Villemadais (10)
4.	FC Nègrepelisse-Montricoux (8)	2–1	Saint-Nauphary AC (9)
5.	AS Bessens (12)	0–7	La Nicolaite (9)
6.	FC Quercy Rouergue (11)	0–4	JS Meauzacaise (8)
7.	AS Mas-Grenier (8)	1–1 (2–4 p)	Stade Larrazet-Garganvillar (9)
8.	Deux Ponts FC (9)	0–4	Avenir Lavitois (8)
9.	JE Montalbanais (10)	2–3	Stade Caussadais (10)
10.	US Réalville Cayra (12)	1–4	FCUS Molières (8)

=== Second round ===
These matches are from the Ariège district, and were played on 4 and 5 September 2021.

Second round results: Occitanie (Ariège)
Tie no	Home team (tier)	Score	Away team (tier)
1.	FC Cerdagne-Font-Romeu-Capcir (Note: FC Cerdagne-Font-Romeu-Capcir are from the Pyrénées-Orientales district.) (10)	1–10	Luzenac AP (6)
2.	FC Pamiers (8)	0–1	FC Saverdun (8)
3.	EN Mazères (9)	2–4	FC Saint-Girons (8)
4.	FC Lézat (10)	0–12	FC Foix (7)
5.	ES Saint-Jean-du-Falga (9)	5–0	FC Mirepoix 09 (9)

These matches are from the Aude district, and were played on 5 September 2021.

Second round results: Occitanie (Aude)
Tie no	Home team (tier)	Score	Away team (tier)
1.	FC Briolet (8)	3–0	Olympique Moussan-Montredon (8)
2.	ES Sainte-Eulalie-Villesèquelande (9)	0–5	CO Castelnaudary (7)
3.	FC Chalabre (9)	2–4	FC Villegly (10)
4.	FC Caux-et-Sauzens (10)	0–2	MJC Gruissan (8)
5.	RC Pieusse (11)	2–5	UFC Narbonne (9)
6.	USA Pezens (7)	1–5	US Conques (7)
7.	Haut-Minervois Olympique (9)	4–1	ES Fanjeaux (10)
8.	AS Pexiora (9)	1–3	Trapel-Pennautier FC (10)
9.	US Belpech (10)	0–4	Trèbes FC (7)
10.	Fleury FC (12)	0–7	UF Lézignanais (8)

These matches are from the Aveyron district, and were played on 4 and 5 September 2021.

Second round results: Occitanie (Aveyron)
Tie no	Home team (tier)	Score	Away team (tier)
1.	AS Aguessac (9)	0–1	Onet-le-Château (6)
2.	Pareloup Céor FC (11)	3–3 (4–3 p)	Association Saint-Laurentaise Cantonale Canourguaise (10)
3.	Sport Saint Serninois (12)	1–2	Méridienne d'Olt FC (10)
4.	US Bas Rouergue (9)	0–3	Druelle FC (7)
5.	FC Naucellois (8)	1–3	FC Comtal (8)
6.	Luc Primaube FC (7)	2–0	Espoir FC 88 (8)
7.	Stade Villefranchois (9)	0–2	JS Bassin Aveyron (8)
8.	AF Lozère (6) (Note: AF Lozère are from the Gard-Lozère district.)	2–0	FC Sources de l'Aveyron (7)
9.	US Argence/Viadène (10)	2–1	US Pays Alzuréen (10)
10.	AS Vabraise (10)	2–2 (5–4 p)	US Réquistanaise (9)
11.	Stade Saint-Affricain (8)	1–2	Entente Saint-Georges/Saint-Rome (9)
12.	US Tournemire-Roquefort (12)	0–8	SO Millau (9)

These matches are from the Gard-Lozère district, and were played on 5 September 2021.

Second round results: Occitanie (Gard-Lozère)
Tie no	Home team (tier)	Score	Away team (tier)
1.	EFC Beaucairois (10)	0–9	AS Rousson (6)
2.	FC Langlade (10)	1–0	US Trèfle (8)
3.	CO Soleil Levant Nîmes (7)	1–1 (6–5 p)	ES Pays d'Uzes (6)
4.	ASC Le Refuge (11)	1–3	SO Aimargues (7)
5.	FC Moussac (11)	1–4	SC Anduzien (7)
6.	SC Saint-Martin-de-Valgalgues (11)	2–3	AS Nîmes Athletic (9)
7.	US Pujaut (11)	1–7	FC Vauverdois (7)
8.	SA Cigalois (10)	1–0	AS Badaroux (12)
9.	OC Bellegarde (10)	0–7	Entente Perrier Vergèze (7)
10.	EF Vézénobres Cruviers (10)	0–3	ES Grau-du-Roi (8)
11.	ES Barjac (10)	0–6	FC Bagnols Pont (6)
12.	Omnisports Saint-Hilaire-La Jasse (10)	2–0	AS Saint-Christol-lès-Alès (10)
13.	CA Bessegeoise (10)	2–3	JS Chemin Bas d'Avignon (7)
14.	AS Le Malzieu (12)	1–10	AS Poulx (9)
15.	Valdonnez FC (11)	0–6	GC Uchaud (7)
16.	Olympique Saintois (9)	3–2	ESC Le Buisson (10)
17.	RC Générac (9)	0–2	US Garons (10)
18.	FC Chusclan-Laudun-l'Ardoise (8)	6–1	AEC Saint-Gilles (9)

These matches are from the Haute-Garonne district, and were played on 4 and 5 September 2021.

Second round results: Occitanie (Haute-Garonne)
Tie no	Home team (tier)	Score	Away team (tier)
1.	Montastruc-de-Salies FC (10)	1–4	EF Castelmaurou Verfeil (10)
2.	FC Beauzelle (8)	2–4	US Revel (6)
3.	FC Quint-Fonsegrives (13)	0–3	Olympique Girou FC (6)
4.	FC Mabroc (8)	0–2	US Cazères (6)
5.	Roques-Confluent Lacroix/Saubens/Pinsaguel (10)	4–1	Entente Landorthe-Labarthe-Estancarbon-Savarthès (9)
6.	Entente Boulogne-Péguilhan (7)	0–0 (4–5 p)	Saint-Orens FC (6)
7.	AS Villemur (10)	2–6	Toulouse Rangueil FC (8)
8.	Toulouse Cheminots Marengo Sports (12)	2–3	Entente Naurouze-Labastide (Note: Entente Naurouze-Labastide are from the Aude district.) (9)
9.	Comminges Saint-Gaudens (7)	2–2 (4–3 p)	JS Cintegabelle (8)
10.	Lagardelle Miremont Sports (11)	1–0 (Note: Tie reversed from original draw.)	ÉF Montjoire-La Magdelaine (13)
11.	Toulouse Foot Compans Caffarelli (9)	1–1 (1–3 p)	US Plaisance (7)
12.	ES Saint-Simon (8)	0–1	Toulouse Rodéo FC (6)
13.	JS Carbonne (8)	1–1 (2–4 p)	Avenir Fonsorbais (7)
14.	FC Roquettois (12)	2–3	US Bouloc Saint-Sauveur (12)
15.	AS Castelnau-d'Estrétefonds (8)	1–4	AS Portet-Carrefour-Récébédou (6)
16.	JE Toulousaine Croix-Daurade (9)	2–2 (4–3 p)	AS Tournefeuille (6)
17.	FC Canal Nord (11)	2–4	US Castelginest (8)
18.	AS Mondonville (10)	0–3	Étoile Aussonnaise (7)
19.	US Seysses-Frouzins (7)	2–1	US Léguevin (8)
20.	US Pouvourville (7)	0–0 (2–0 p)	US Pibrac (6)
21.	Grenade FC (10)	1–3	Toulouse Métropole FC (6)
22.	EFC Aurignac (10)	1–2	JS Cugnaux (8)
23.	JS Brax (10)	1–1 (3–5 p)	Juventus de Papus (6)
24.	US Encausse-Soueich-Ganties (9)	4–0	JS Toulouse Pradettes (8)

These matches are from the Gers district, and were played on 3, 4 and 5 September 2021.

Second round results: Occitanie (Gers)
Tie no	Home team (tier)	Score	Away team (tier)
1.	Forza Labéjan-Saint-Jean-le-Comtal (9)	3–0	Rassemblement Bas Armangnac FC (10)
2.	ES Gimontoise (9)	4–4 (6–5 p)	AO Cornebarrieu (Note: AO Cornebarrieu are from the Haute-Garonne district.) (10)
3.	US Aignanais (9)	2–1	US Aubiet (9)
4.	FC Pavien (8)	1–2	Auch Football (6)
5.	FC Castéra-Verduzan (9)	– (Note: Match not played due to floodlight failure. FC Castéra-Verduzan penalised. FC L'Islois qualify.)	FC L'Islois (8)
6.	AS Manciet (9)	3–0	FC Mirandais (9)
7.	US Duran (10)	1–3	AS Fleurance-La Sauvetat (7)

These matches are from the Hérault district, and were played on 5 September 2021.

Second round results: Occitanie (Hérault)
Tie no	Home team (tier)	Score	Away team (tier)
1.	ES Pérols (8)	1–1 (4–3 p)	AS Pignan (8)
2.	US Pougetoise (11)	1–1 (2–3 p)	US Montagnacoise (8)
3.	Stade Balarucois (6)	1–1 (1–3 p)	AS Lattoise (6)
4.	AS Puissalicon-Magalas (9)	4–0	FC Petit Bard (7)
5.	FC Lespignan-Vendres (9)	0–7	Castelnau Le Crès FC (6)
6.	RS Gigeannais (10)	1–2	FC Thongue et Libron (11)
7.	Aurore Saint-Gilloise (9)	2–3	Entente Saint-Clément-Montferrier (6)
8.	winner tie 7	– (Note: PI Vendargues awarded a bye, as both teams in the previous round were penalised.)	PI Vendargues (6)
9.	US Mauguio Carnon (8)	3–2	AS Gignacois (8)
10.	US Villeneuvoise (12)	1–0	SC Saint-Thibérien (9)
11.	FC Lamalou-les-Bains (11)	0–4	Olympique La Peyrade FC (9)
12.	FC Sauvian (13)	0–5	AS Frontignan AC (6)
13.	Arsenal Croix d'Argent (12)	1–2	RC Lemasson Montpellier (11)
14.	US Villeveyracoise (12)	0–0 (8–7 p)	GC Lunel (6)
15.	Mèze Stade FC (8)	1–4	SC Cers-Portiragnes (6)
16.	ES Paulhan-Pézenas (10)	0–3	La Clermontaise Football (6)
17.	AS Bessanaise (11)	2–8	AS Atlas Paillade (7)
18.	AS Montarnaud-Saint-Paul-Vaihauques-Murviel (8)	1–2	Olympique Saint-André-de-Sangonis (8)
19.	FC Saint-Pargoire (12)	1–1 (2–4 p)	FO Sud Hérault (8)
20.	Pointe Courte AC Sète (10)	3–1	CE Palavas (7)
21.	Entente Corneilhan-Lignan (9)	2–0	RC Vedasien (8)
22.	FCO Valras-Serignan (9)	3–2	ES Grand Orb Foot (10)
23.	Jacou Clapiers FA (10)	2–0	US Béziers (7)

These matches are from the Lot district, and were played on 4 and 5 September 2021.

Second round results: Occitanie (Lot)
Tie no	Home team (tier)	Score	Away team (tier)
1.	Uxello FC Capdenac (11)	0–3	Pradines-Saint-Vincent-Douelle-Mercuès Olt (7)
2.	ES Souillac-Cressenac-Gignac (9)	0–3	Cahors FC (7)
3.	FC Bégoux Arcambal (12)	1–5	FC Biars-Bretenoux (7)
4.	FC Haut Quercy (10)	4–2	AS Montcabrier (9)
5.	Entente Bleuets Lendou-Saint-Cyprien-Montcuq (10)	6–1	Entente Cajarc Cenevières (9)
6.	Élan Marivalois (9)	5–0	Haut Célé FC (9)
7.	Touzac Malbec FC (12)	0–3 (Note: Tie won by means of forfeit.)	Val Roc Foot (9)

These matches are from the Hautes-Pyrénées district, and were played on 4 and 5 September 2021.

Second round results: Occitanie (Hautes-Pyrénées)
Tie no	Home team (tier)	Score	Away team (tier)
1.	ASC Barbazan-Debat (9)	0–1	ES Haut Adour (8)
2.	Quand Même Orleix (8)	0–0 (3–1 p)	Soues Cigognes FC (8)
3.	FC des Nestes (9)	2–0	FC Bordes (10)
4.	US Marquisat Bénac (8)	0–4	Tarbes Pyrénées Football (6)
5.	Elan Pyrénéen Bazet-Bordères-Lagarde (9)	1–0	US Tarbais Nouvelle Vague (9)
6.	US Salies-du-Salat/Mane/Saint-Martory (6)	5–1	Juillan OS (7)
7.	FC Val d'Adour (9)	0–4	FC Lourdais XI (6)

These matches are from the Pyrénées-Orientales district, and were played on 5 September 2021.

Second round results: Occitanie (Pyrénées-Orientales)
Tie no	Home team (tier)	Score	Away team (tier)
1.	BECE FC Vallée de l'Aigly (9)	2–1	Elne FC (7)
2.	Association Théza Alénya Corneilla FC (9)	0–2	Les Amis de Cédric Brunier (10)
3.	FC Laurentin (8)	1–1 (5–6 p)	Sporting Perpignan Nord (7)
4.	Baho-Pézilla FC (9)	2–1	FA Carcassonne (6)
5.	SO Rivesaltais (8)	0–4	Union Saint-Estève Espoir Perpignan Méditerannée Métropole (6)
6.	FC Latour-Bas-Elne (12)	0–2	FC Thuirinois (9)
7.	Céret FC (10)	1–3	OC Perpignan (7)

These matches are from the Tarn district, and were played on 3, 4 and 5 September 2021.

Second round results: Occitanie (Tarn)
Tie no	Home team (tier)	Score	Away team (tier)
1.	US Cordes (9)	1–4	US Labruguièroise (10)
2.	AS Giroussens (8)	3–2	Les Copains d'Abord (8)
3.	US Autan (10)	4–0	Valence OF (10)
4.	Saint-Juéry OF (7)	2–1	FC Graulhet (6)
5.	AJ Massalaise (10)	1–1 (4–5 p)	US Saint-Sulpice (7)
6.	FC Vignoble 81 (9)	4–0	US Carmaux (10)
7.	US Castres (8)	2–0	La Cremade FC (9)
8.	Cambounet FC (8)	0–3	Albi Marssac Tarn Football ASPTT (6)
9.	AS Lagrave (10)	1–1 (3–4 p)	AF Pays d'Oc 81 (9)
10.	Lavaur FC (8)	1–3	L'Union Saint-Jean FC (6)
11.	La Mygale Le Séquestre Football (9)	1–4	US Albi (8)

These matches are from the Tarn-et-Garonne district, and were played on 4 and 5 September 2021.

Second round results: Occitanie (Tarn-et-Garonne)
Tie no	Home team (tier)	Score	Away team (tier)
1.	La Nicolaite (9)	4–1	FCUS Molières (8)
2.	FC Nègrepelisse-Montricoux (8)	1–1 (5–6 p)	Saint-Alban Aucamville FC (Note: Saint-Alban Aucamville FC are from the Haute-Garonne district.) (6)
3.	Avenir Lavitois (8)	3–1	JS Meauzacaise (8)
4.	Confluences FC (8)	1–2	Cazes Olympique (7)
5.	Entente Golfech-Saint-Paul-d'Espis (6)	2–1	AS Bressols (7)
6.	Stade Larrazet-Garganvillar (9)	3–2	AA Grisolles (7)
7.	Coquelicots Montéchois FC (9)	0–5	Montauban FCTG (7)
8.	Stade Caussadais (10)	0–3	AS Stéphanoise (9)

=== Third round ===
These matches were played on 17, 18 and 19 September 2021, with three postponed until 25 and 26 September 2021 and one postponed further to 3 October 2021.

Third round results: Occitanie
Tie no	Home team (tier)	Score	Away team (tier)
1.	FC des Nestes (9)	2–3	Montauban FCTG (7)
2.	Étoile Aussonnaise (7)	1–2	Blagnac FC (5)
3.	AS Stéphanoise (9)	1–3	ES Gimontoise (9)
4.	US Castelginest (8)	0–3	Auch Football (6)
5.	US Cazères (6)	2–0	Comminges Saint-Gaudens (7)
6.	US Encausse-Soueich-Ganties (9)	1–2	FC L'Islois (8)
7.	JS Cugnaux (8)	1–0	US Salies-du-Salat/Mane/Saint-Martory (6)
8.	AS Manciet (9)	1–5	FC Lourdais XI (6)
9.	Avenir Lavitois (8)	2–1 (Note: Tie originally postponed due to unplayable pitch. The replay on 25 September was postponed after 57 minutes due to storms, with the scoreline 2–0. To be replayed again on 3 October.)	Forza Labéjan-Saint-Jean-le-Comtal (9)
10.	La Nicolaite (9)	1–3	Entente Golfech-Saint-Paul-d'Espis (6)
11.	Stade Larrazet-Garganvillar (9)	0–0 (4–1 p)	AS Fleurance-La Sauvetat (7)
12.	Elan Pyrénéen Bazet-Bordères-Lagarde (9)	1–1 (3–0 p)	US Plaisance (7)
13.	Quand Même Orleix (8)	0–2	Balma SC (5)
14.	ES Haut Adour (8)	5–2	US Aignanais (9)
15.	Tarbes Pyrénées Football (6)	3–1	Cazes Olympique (7)
16.	Méridienne d'Olt FC (10)	0–4	Albi Marssac Tarn Football ASPTT (6)
17.	Entente Saint-Georges/Saint-Rome (9)	1–3	Luc Primaube FC (7)
18.	US Bouloc Saint-Sauveur (12)	0–3	FC Comtal (8)
19.	Entente Bleuets Lendou-Saint-Cyprien-Montcuq (10)	1–10	Toulouse Rodéo FC (6)
20.	FC Biars-Bretenoux (7)	6–1	Saint-Alban Aucamville FC (6)
21.	AF Pays d'Oc 81 (9)	2–4	JS Bassin Aveyron (8)
22.	Pradines-Saint-Vincent-Douelle-Mercuès Olt (7)	0–2	Saint-Juéry OF (7)
23.	AS Vabraise (10)	1–0	Pareloup Céor FC (11)
24.	AS Giroussens (8)	0–4	Olympique Girou FC (6)
25.	Juventus de Papus (6)	0–0 (6–5 p)	Onet-le-Château (6)
26.	FC Haut Quercy (10)	0–7	US Castanéenne (5)
27.	Val Roc Foot (9)	1–2	Élan Marivalois (9)
28.	Druelle FC (7)	4–1	US Albi (8)
29.	US Argence/Viadène (10)	0–5	AS Muret (5)
30.	Roques-Confluent Lacroix/Saubens/Pinsaguel (10)	0–4	Cahors FC (7)
31.	FC Villegly (10)	1–5	L'Union Saint-Jean FC (6)
32.	JE Toulousaine Croix-Daurade (9)	3–1	FC Vignoble 81 (9)
33.	Trapel-Pennautier FC (10)	0–3	US Revel (6)
34.	US Labruguièroise (10)	2–4	ES Saint-Jean-du-Falga (9)
35.	FC Saverdun (8)	2–2 (5–4 p)	CO Castelnaudary (7)
36.	Avenir Fonsorbais (7)	1–3	FC Alberes Argelès (5)
37.	FC Saint-Girons (8)	0–6	FU Narbonne (5)
38.	FC Foix (7)	0–2	AS Portet-Carrefour-Récébédou (6)
39.	Lagardelle Miremont Sports (11)	1–2	Toulouse Rangueil FC (8)
40.	Haut-Minervois Olympique (9)	1–1 (4–2 p)	Saint-Orens FC (6)
41.	EF Castelmaurou Verfeil (10)	1–2	US Saint-Sulpice (7)
42.	Entente Naurouze-Labastide (9)	2–3	US Autan (10)
43.	SO Millau (9)	2–2 (3–4 p)	US Seysses-Frouzins (7)
44.	Toulouse Métropole FC (6)	3–0	US Pouvourville (7)
45.	US Castres (8)	0–3	Luzenac AP (6)
46.	FC Thongue et Libron (11)	3–1	Baho-Pézilla FC (9)
47.	FC Thuirinois (9)	2–2 (5–3 p)	Entente Corneilhan-Lignan (9)
48.	UFC Narbonne (9)	0–4	RCO Agde (5)
49.	BECE FC Vallée de l'Aigly (9)	0–2	Sporting Perpignan Nord (7)
50.	UF Lézignanais (8)	1–2	AS Puissalicon-Magalas (9)
51.	OC Perpignan (7)	1–2	SO Aimargues (7)
52.	Union Saint-Estève Espoir Perpignan Méditerannée Métropole (6)	2–0	AS Lattoise (6)
53.	US Villeveyracoise (12)	0–0 (5–3 p)	FC Briolet (8)
54.	Olympique La Peyrade FC (9)	1–4	AS Frontignan AC (6)
55.	MJC Gruissan (8)	0–0 (2–4 p)	FCO Valras-Serignan (9)
56.	US Montagnacoise (8)	1–5	Castelnau Le Crès FC (6)
57.	AS Atlas Paillade (7)	4–1	US Conques (7)
58.	Trèbes FC (7)	1–2	FO Sud Hérault (8)
59.	La Clermontaise Football (6)	3–0	SC Cers-Portiragnes (6)
60.	Les Amis de Cédric Brunier (10)	1–2	AS Fabrègues (5)
61.	SA Cigalois (10)	0–7	SC Anduzien (7)
62.	US Mauguio Carnon (8)	1–9	Olympique Alès (5)
63.	RC Lemasson Montpellier (11)	3–5	AS Rousson (6)
64.	ES Grau-du-Roi (8)	1–1 (5–3 p)	FC Bagnols Pont (6)
65.	Omnisports Saint-Hilaire-La Jasse (10)	0–5	Entente Perrier Vergèze (7)
66.	Olympique Saint-André-de-Sangonis (8)	3–1	Olympique Saintois (9)
67.	AS Poulx (9)	0–0 (4–3 p)	CO Soleil Levant Nîmes (7)
68.	Jacou Clapiers FA (10)	1–3	FC Langlade (10)
69.	GC Uchaud (7)	2–2 (5–4 p)	ES Pérols (8)
70.	US Villeneuvoise (12)	– (Note: Match was abandoned in the second half, due to smoke bombs thrown onto the pitch. The scoreline at the time was 1–4. US Villeneuvoise penalised, FC Chusclan-Laudun-l'Ardoise qualify.)	FC Chusclan-Laudun-l'Ardoise (8)
71.	US Garons (10)	2–6	JS Chemin Bas d'Avignon (7)
72.	Entente Saint-Clément-Montferrier (6)	0–1	US Salinières Aigues Mortes (6)
73.	PI Vendargues (6)	0–1	FC Vauverdois (7)
74.	AS Nîmes Athletic (9)	2–1	Pointe Courte AC Sète (10)
75.	Stade Beaucairois (5)	0–2 (Note: Tie reversed from original draw.)	AF Lozère (6)

=== Fourth round ===
These matches were played on 2 and 3 October 2021, with one postponed until 10 October 2021.

Fourth round results: Occitanie
Tie no	Home team (tier)	Score	Away team (tier)
1.	AS Vabraise (10)	3–0 (Note: Tie won by means of forfeit, because Tarbes Pyrénées Football arrived too late for the game, having travelled to the wrong town.)	Tarbes Pyrénées Football (6)
2.	Luc Primaube FC (7)	0–0 (4–3 p)	Balma SC (5)
3.	FC Lourdais XI (6)	2–0	US Colomiers Football (4)
4.	FC L'Islois (8)	0–4	FC Biars-Bretenoux (7)
5.	Entente Golfech-Saint-Paul-d'Espis (6)	3–3 (4–5 p)	US Cazères (6)
6.	JS Bassin Aveyron (8)	8–1	ES Haut Adour (8)
7.	Saint-Juéry OF (7)	0–3	Blagnac FC (5)
8.	Elan Pyrénéen Bazet-Bordères-Lagarde (9)	0–1	Auch Football (6)
9.	ES Gimontoise (9)	4–1 (Note: Tie reversed from original draw.)	Avenir Lavitois (8)
10.	Élan Marivalois (9)	1–2	Montauban FCTG (7)
11.	FC Comtal (8)	0–2	AS Muret (5)
12.	Stade Larrazet-Garganvillar (9)	1–6	Druelle FC (7)
13.	Cahors FC (7)	4–3	Albi Marssac Tarn Football ASPTT (6)
14.	Sporting Perpignan Nord (7)	0–0 (9–8 p)	FU Narbonne (5)
15.	FC Saverdun (8)	1–1 (6–5 p)	Olympique Girou FC (6)
16.	Toulouse Rangueil FC (8)	1–2	US Seysses-Frouzins (7)
17.	US Saint-Sulpice (7)	2–0	Juventus de Papus (6)
18.	L'Union Saint-Jean FC (6)	1–0	US Castanéenne (5)
19.	FC Thongue et Libron (11)	1–1 (4–2 p)	Haut-Minervois Olympique (9)
20.	ES Saint-Jean-du-Falga (9)	1–5	Union Saint-Estève Espoir Perpignan Méditerannée Métropole (6)
21.	FC Thuirinois (9)	0–1	JS Cugnaux (8)
22.	US Autan (10)	0–3	Toulouse Rodéo FC (6)
23.	US Revel (6)	1–0	AS Portet-Carrefour-Récébédou (6)
24.	FCO Valras-Serignan (9)	0–4	Toulouse Métropole FC (6)
25.	JE Toulousaine Croix-Daurade (9)	0–1	FC Alberes Argelès (5)
26.	Luzenac AP (6)	0–1	Canet Roussillon FC (4)
27.	AS Fabrègues (5)	0–1	RCO Agde (5)
28.	FC Vauverdois (7)	1–0	Entente Perrier Vergèze (7)
29.	AF Lozère (6)	1–1 (4–5 p)	Olympique Alès (5)
30.	FC Chusclan-Laudun-l'Ardoise (8)	1–1 (5–4 p)	Castelnau Le Crès FC (6)
31.	FC Langlade (10)	0–0 (4–3 p)	FO Sud Hérault (8)
32.	Olympique Saint-André-de-Sangonis (8)	0–4	AS Frontignan AC (6)
33.	US Salinières Aigues Mortes (6)	0–0 (4–5 p)	AS Béziers (4)
34.	AS Puissalicon-Magalas (9)	1–2	AS Rousson (6)
35.	JS Chemin Bas d'Avignon (7)	1–1 (4–2 p)	ES Grau-du-Roi (8)
36.	GC Uchaud (7)	1–1 (4–3 p)	AS Atlas Paillade (7)
37.	AS Nîmes Athletic (9)	1–3	SO Aimargues (7)
38.	AS Poulx (9)	2–5	La Clermontaise Football (6)
39.	US Villeveyracoise (12)	0–3	SC Anduzien (7)

=== Fifth round ===
These were played on 16 and 17 October 2021.

Fifth round results: Occitanie
Tie no	Home team (tier)	Score	Away team (tier)
1.	Toulouse Métropole FC (6)	3–1	Auch Football (6)
2.	ES Gimontoise (9)	0–2	US Seysses-Frouzins (7)
3.	FC Chusclan-Laudun-l'Ardoise (8)	2–0	AS Béziers (4)
4.	FC Saverdun (8)	0–0 (3–4 p)	JS Chemin Bas d'Avignon (7)
5.	AS Vabraise (10)	1–1 (2–4 p)	GC Uchaud (7)
6.	US Saint-Sulpice (7)	2–3	L'Union Saint-Jean FC (6)
7.	FC Thongue et Libron (11)	1–8	RCO Agde (5)
8.	Montauban FCTG (7)	2–0	Cahors FC (7)
9.	JS Bassin Aveyron (8)	0–1	AS Muret (5)
10.	AS Rousson (6)	2–1	Toulouse Rodéo FC (6)
11.	SO Aimargues (7)	1–4	Luc Primaube FC (7)
12.	SC Anduzien (7)	0–4	Canet Roussillon FC (4)
13.	Union Saint-Estève Espoir Perpignan Méditerannée Métropole (6)	2–1	FC Sète 34 (3)
14.	Blagnac FC (5)	3–1	La Clermontaise Football (6)
15.	Druelle FC (7)	0–2	FC Alberes Argelès (5)
16.	FC Biars-Bretenoux (7)	0–0 (2–3 p)	US Revel (6)
17.	JS Cugnaux (8)	0–2	Olympique Alès (5)
18.	US Cazères (6)	1–4	FC Vauverdois (7)
19.	AS Frontignan AC (6)	4–0	Sporting Perpignan Nord (7)
20.	FC Langlade (10)	3–2	FC Lourdais XI (6)

=== Sixth round ===
These were played on 30 and 31 October 2021.

Sixth round results: Occitanie
Tie no	Home team (tier)	Score	Away team (tier)
1.	US Seysses-Frouzins (7)	0–2	Canet Roussillon FC (4)
2.	Olympique Alès (5)	4–3	Blagnac FC (5)
3.	Toulouse Métropole FC (6)	3–1	AS Rousson (6)
4.	FC Langlade (10)	0–0 (6–5 p)	FC Alberes Argelès (5)
5.	FC Vauverdois (7)	1–2	AS Frontignan AC (6)
6.	GC Uchaud (7)	1–1 (5–6 p)	JS Chemin Bas d'Avignon (7)
7.	US Revel (6)	0–0 (6–7 p)	RCO Agde (5)
8.	Luc Primaube FC (7)	1–1 (4–5 p)	Montauban FCTG (7)
9.	FC Chusclan-Laudun-l'Ardoise (8)	1–0 (Note: The original match on 31 October 2021 ended 1–0, but a technical challenge was made by Union Saint-Estève Espoir Perpignan Méditerannée Métropole due to a missing signature on the license of one of the FC Chusclan-Laudun-l'Ardoise players. The ruling commission of the Occitanie league ordered the game to be replayed on 7 November 2021, without the player in question being involved. However, on 6 November 2021, the appeal commission of the league overturned this decision, ruling that the original result stood.)	Union Saint-Estève Espoir Perpignan Méditerannée Métropole (6)
10.	AS Muret (5)	1–1 (5–4 p)	L'Union Saint-Jean FC (6)
