= Mohamed Camara (footballer, born 1990) =

Guinean professional footballer

Personal information
- Date of birth: 20 September 1990 (age 36)
- Place of birth: Guinea
- Height: 1.80 m (5 ft 11 in)
- Position: Forward

Team information
- Current team: Olympique Saint-Quentin
- Number: 17

Youth career
- Fello Star

Senior career*
Years	Team	Apps	(Gls)
2009–2014	Troyes	25	(4)
2012–2013	→ Poiré-sur-Vie (loan)	13	(0)
2014–	Olympique Saint-Quentin	45	(12)
- * Club domestic league appearances and goals as of 19 November 2016

Mohamed Camara (born 20 September 1990) is a Guinean professional footballer who plays for Olympique Saint-Quentin.
