= Montlebon =

- Commune
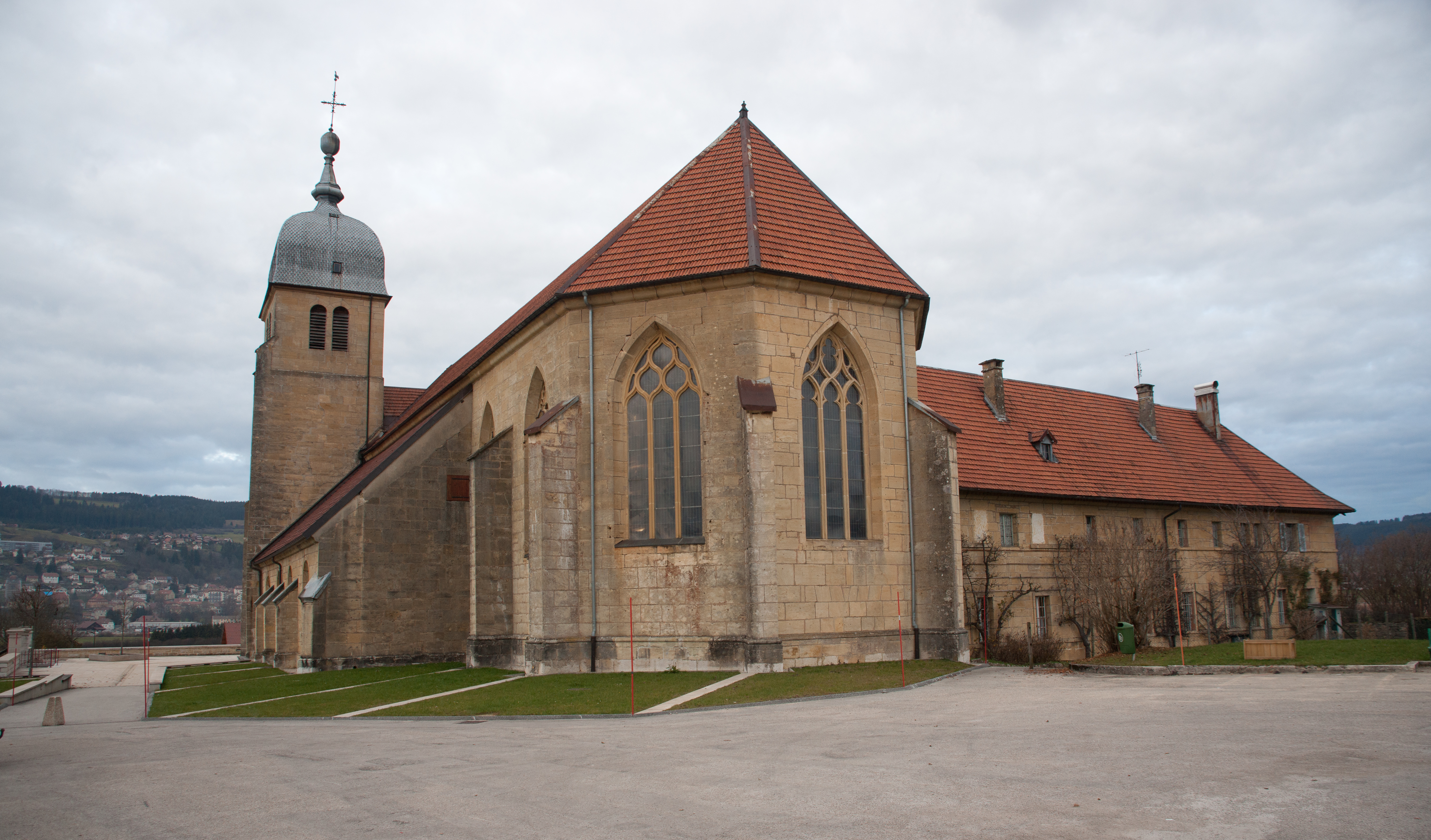
- Convent of Minimes de la Seigne

- Coat of arms
- Location of Montlebon
- Location within France Location within Bourgogne-Franche-Comté
- Coordinates: 47°02′33″N 6°36′29″E
- Country: France
- Region: Bourgogne-Franche-Comté
- Department: Doubs
- Arrondissement: Pontarlier
- Canton: Morteau
- Intercommunality: Val de Morteau

Government
  - Mayor (2020–2026): Catherine Rognon
- Area^{1}: 27.27 km^{2} (10.53 sq mi)
- Highest elevation: 1,287 m (4,222 ft)
- Lowest elevation: 750 m (2,460 ft)
- Population (2023): 2,244
  - Density: 82.29/km^{2} (213.1/sq mi)
- Time zone: UTC+01:00 (CET)
  - Summer (DST): UTC+02:00 (CEST)
- INSEE/Postal code: 25403 /25500
- ^{1} French Land Register data, which excludes lakes, ponds, glaciers > 1 km^{2} (0.386 sq mi or 247 acres) and river estuaries.

Montlebon (French pronunciation: [mɔ̃ləbɔ̃]) is a commune in the Doubs department in the Bourgogne-Franche-Comté region in eastern France.

== Geography ==
Montlebon lies 2 km (1.2 mi) south of Morteau.

== Population ==
Historical population
Year	Pop.	±% p.a.
1968	1,435	—
1975	1,465	+0.30%
1982	1,404	−0.61%
1990	1,587	+1.54%
1999	1,710	+0.83%
2007	1,896	+1.30%
2012	1,974	+0.81%
2017	2,081	+1.06%
2023	2,244	+1.26%
Source: INSEE

== See also ==
- Communes of the Doubs department
