= Romain Fleurier =

French footballer (born 1997)

Personal information
- Date of birth: 17 March 1997 (age 29)
- Place of birth: Beauvais, France
- Height: 1.76 m (5 ft 9 in)
- Position: Defender

Team information
- Current team: Beauvais Oise
- Number: 24

Senior career*
Years	Team	Apps	(Gls)
2015–2018	Beauvais	40	(1)
2018–2020	Chambly B	30	(1)
2018–2020	Chambly	10	(0)
2020–2021	Villefranche	30	(2)
2021–2022	Bourg-en-Bresse	24	(1)
2022–2023	Sedan	13	(0)
2023–2024	Mâcon	14	(0)
2025–	Beauvais Oise	4	(0)
- * Club domestic league appearances and goals as of 4 December 2025

Romain Fleurier (born 17 March 1997) is a French professional footballer who plays as a defender for Championnat National 1 club Beauvais Oise.

== Club career ==
Fleurier trained with Beauvais, and was recruited by Chambly in the summer of 2018 to play with the B team in Championnat National 3. When the senior team were promoted to Ligue 2 at the end of the 2018–19 season, Fleurier started training with the senior squad, being the only member of the group on an amateur contract. He made his Ligue 2 debut with the Chambly first team in a 2–0 loss to AC Ajaccio on 29 November 2019.

In May 2020, Fleurier signed with Championnat National side Villefranche. On 20 June 2021, he moved to Bourg-en-Bresse.

On 9 June 2022, Fleurier agreed to join Sedan.
