= Stade Vuillermet =

Sports venue in Lyon

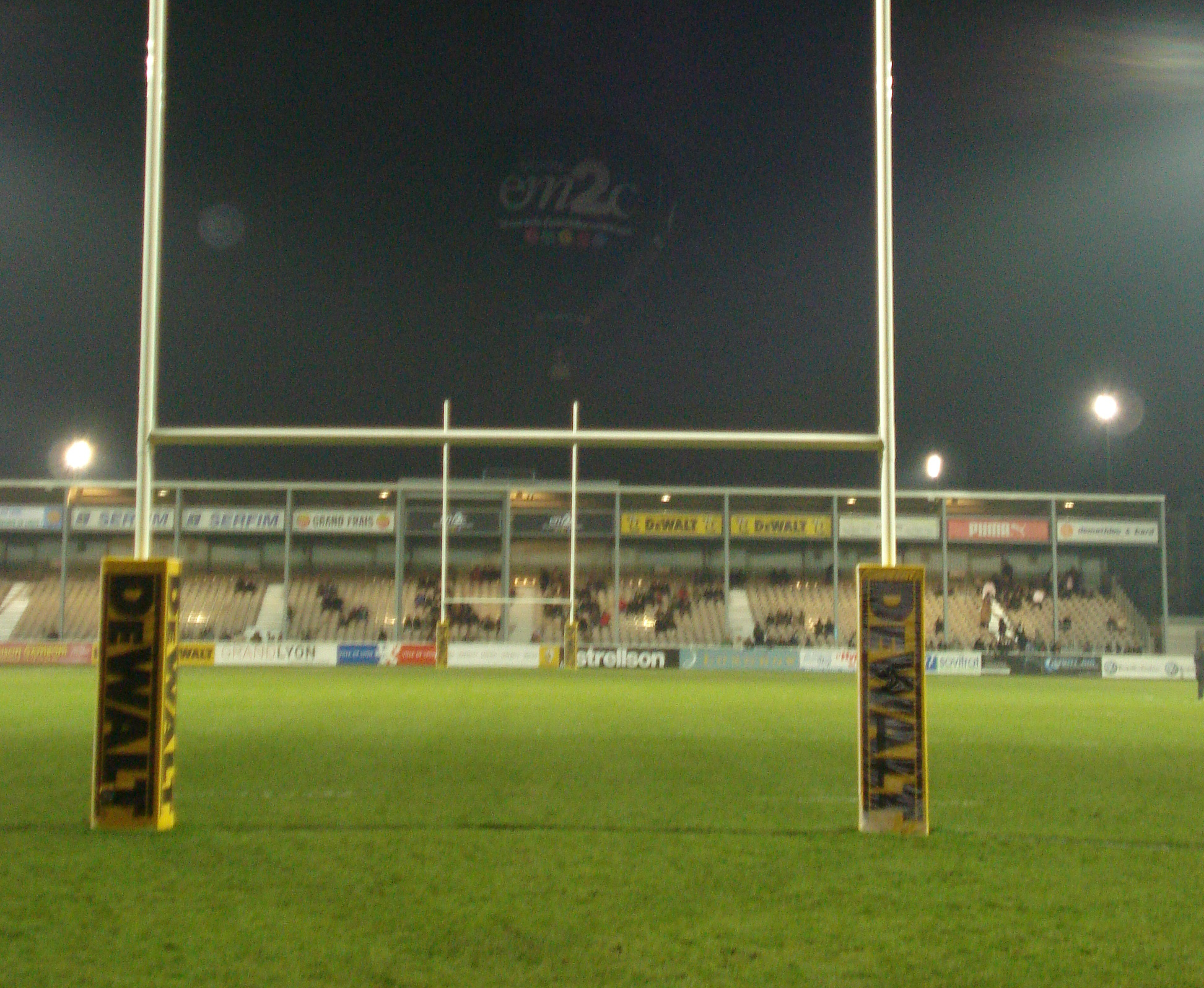
- Interactive map of Stade Vuillermet
- Coordinates: 45°43′27″N 4°52′51″E
- Owner: City of Lyon
- Capacity: 4,822
- Surface: grass

Construction
- Built: 1962

Tenants
- Lyon OU; FC Lyon

Stade Vuillermet is a sports stadium in Lyon, Rhône-Alpes in France. The stadium was mostly used for rugby union by Lyon OU, until the club moved to the newly built Matmut Stadium in November 2011.
