= AS Beauvais Oise =

French football club, based in Beauvais

AS Beauvais
- Full name: Association Sportive Beauvais Oise
- Founded: 1945; 81 years ago
- Ground: Stade Pierre Brisson, Beauvais
- Capacity: 10,178
- Chairman: Guillaume Godin and Sylvain Reghem
- Manager: Sébastien Dailly
- League: National 2 Group B
- 2025–26: National 2 Group B, 12th of 16 (excluded)
- Website: www.asbo.fr
Home colours	Away colours

Association Sportive Beauvais Oise (French pronunciation: [asɔsjɑsjɔ̃ spɔʁtiv bovɛ waz]; commonly referred to as AS Beauvais, ASBO, or simply Beauvais) is a French association football club based in Beauvais. The club was formed in 1945 as a result of a merger and currently play in the Championnat National 1, the fourth level of French football. Beauvais plays its home matches at the Stade Pierre Brisson located within the city.

== History ==
AS Beauvais Oise was founded in 1945 under the name AS Beauvais-Marissel as a result of a merger between local clubs Véloce Club Beauvaisien, Union Sportive de Voisinlieu and GS Marissel. The club began its history as an amateur club, but achieved professional status in 1986, changing its name to the simpler AS Beauvais. From 1986 to 2003, Beauvais played mostly in the second division of French football.

In 1989, the name of the club was changed to AS Beauvais Oise.

In 2004, the club was relegated from the Championnat National and gave up its professional status.

== Current squad ==
As of 15 November 2025

Note: Flags indicate national team as defined under FIFA eligibility rules; some limited exceptions apply. Players may hold more than one non-FIFA nationality.

No.	Pos.	Nation	Player
3	DF	BEN	Prince-Eddy Gnonlonfoun
4	DF	FRA	Hamza Chahid
6	MF	FRA	Housam Khebizi
7	MF	COD	Zola Oniesim
8	MF	FRA	Tom Frayssinous
9	FW	FRA	Patrice Mendy
10	MF	FRA	Yannis Amimer
11	FW	FRA	Niaki Sacko
12	DF	COD	Francis Pene
14	MF	FRA	Houdayfa Camara
16	GK	FRA	Stanley Kouamé
18	FW	FRA	Hugo Cardon

No.	Pos.	Nation	Player
19	FW	FRA	Ali Ouarti
20	FW	FRA	Allan Badirou
21	DF	FRA	Mory Mara
22	MF	FRA	Kevyn Adèle
23	DF	FRA	Melvin Bachelet
24	DF	FRA	Romain Fleurier
25	FW	FRA	Kalvin Luong
26	MF	FRA	Killian Corenthin
27	DF	FRA	Bila Antonio
28	MF	FRA	Owen Martinez-Jullien
30	GK	GUF	Mickaël Bod
33	FW	FRA	Gabriel Ilunga Tshilomba
—	DF	FRA	Joël Tsimba

=== Notable players ===
For a list of former Beauvais players, see Category:AS Beauvais Oise players.

- (France) Valentin Gendrey (youth)
- (France) Steven Nzonzi (youth)
- (France) Nhoa Sangui (youth)

== Honours ==
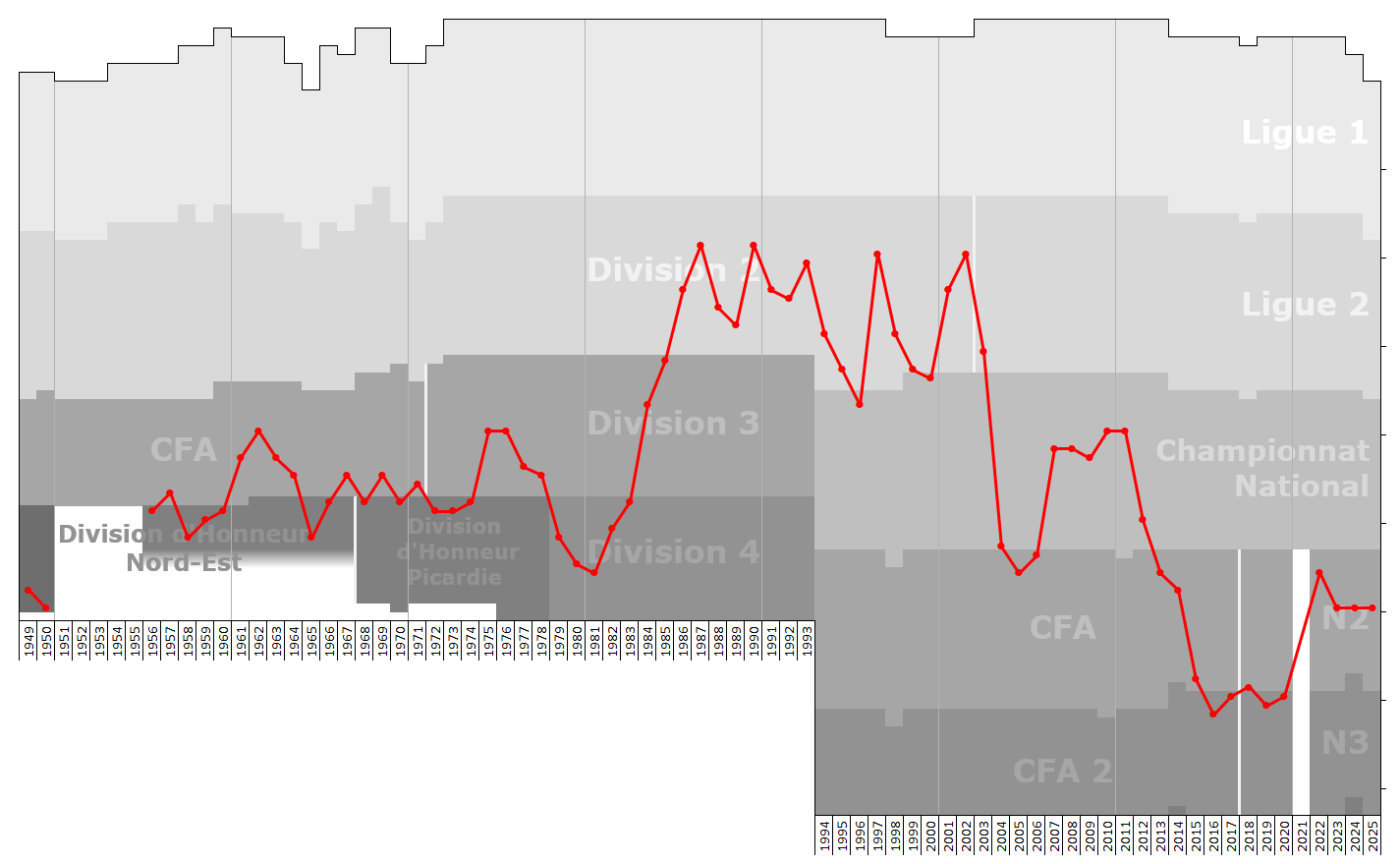
Historical league performance chart of AS Beauvais

- Championnat National
  - Champions (1): 2000
- Championnat de France Amateur
  - Champions (1): 2006
- Division d'Honneur (Picardie)
  - Champions (6): 1968, 1970, 1974
- Division d'Honneur (Nord-Est)
  - Champions (3): 1956, 1960, 1966
- Coupe de Picardie
  - Champions (1): 2008
- Coupe de l'Oise
  - Champions (15): 1955, 1959, 1965, 1966, 1972, 1973, 1974, 1976, 1977, 1982, 1983, 1984, 1987, 1992, 1993
