= JS Chemin Bas d'Avignon =

Football club based in Nîmes, France

Chemin Bas d'Avignon
- Full name: Jeunesse Sportive du Chemin Bas d'Avignon
- Founded: 1962
- Stadium: Stade Jean-Bouin; Stade Marcel Rouvière
- Manager: Stephane Dartayet
- League: Régional 2 Occitanie; Group A

Jeunesse Sportive du Chemin Bas d'Avignon, also known as Nîmes Chemin Bas, is a football club based in the district of Chemin-Bas d'Avignon in Nîmes, France. Founded in 1962, the club competes in the Régional 2, the seventh tier of French football, as of the 2021–22 season. The club's colours are blue and black.

Chemin Bas d'Avignon reached the round of 64 of the Coupe de France for the first time in the club's history in the 2021–22 edition of the tournament.

== Notable former players ==
- (France) Sofiane Alakouch
