= Hicham Mlaab =

French footballer (born 1990)

Personal information
- Full name: Hicham Mlaab
- Date of birth: 27 February 1990 (age 36)
- Place of birth: Pau, France
- Height: 1.77 m (5 ft 10 in)
- Position: Midfielder

Team information
- Current team: Bergerac
- Number: 10

Youth career
- Pau
- Rennes

Senior career*
Years	Team	Apps	(Gls)
2008–2010	Rennes B		
2010–2013	Pau	80	(21)
2013–2014	Lens B	20	(8)
2014–2015	Pau	21	(7)
2015–2017	Nantes B	32	(9)
2015–2016	→ Nantes	2	(0)
2017–2018	Paris Saint-Germain B	0	(0)
2018	Vitré	11	(4)
2019–2020	Avranches	27	(2)
2020–	Bergerac	73	(13)
- * Club domestic league appearances and goals as of 20:15, 10 June 2024 (UTC)

Hicham Mlaab (born 27 February 1990) is a French footballer who plays for Bergerac Périgord FC.

== Career ==
Mlaab started his career with academy of Rennes in 2005, winning the Coupe Gambardella in 2008 with the youth team. He left Rennes in 2010, signing for Pau. In 2013 he signed for Lens, being given an opportunity to earn a first team place in the reserves, but the chance never came and he returned to Pau in 2014.

In June 2015 he signed for Nantes and made his Ligue 1 debut on 28 November 2015 against SC Bastia. He signed his first professional contract with the club at the start of 2016.

In June 2017 he signed for the reserve team of Paris Saint-Germain in Championnat National 2. In July 2018 he moved to AS Vitré.

In January 2019, he signed a five-month contract with Avranches. On June 1, 2020, Bergerac confirmed that Mlaab had joined the club.

== Personal life ==
Born in France, Mlaab is of Moroccan descent.
