= Thomas Gaydu =

Guadeloupean footballer (born 1998)

Personal information
- Full name: Thomas Léon Gaydu
- Date of birth: 23 July 1998 (age 28)
- Place of birth: Pointe-à-Pitre, Guadeloupe
- Position: Forward

Senior career*
Years	Team	Apps	(Gls)
–2016	Étoile Fréjus Saint-Raphaël	1	(0)
2016–2017	Inter Milan	0	(0)
2018–19	Solidarité-Scolaire		

International career
2019–	Guadeloupe	3	(0)
- * Club domestic league appearances and goals

Thomas Léon Gaydu (born 23 July 1998) is a Guadeloupean footballer.

== Career ==
In 2016, Gaydu signed for Inter Milan, one of Italy's most successful clubs, from Étoile Fréjus Saint-Raphaël in the French third division.

In 2017, he trialed unsuccessfully with English second division side Cardiff City, before contemplating quitting football.

For the second half of 2018/19, he returned to Guadeloupe with Solidarité-Scolaire.
