= Stade Francis-Rongiéras =

Multi-purpose stadium in Périgueux, France

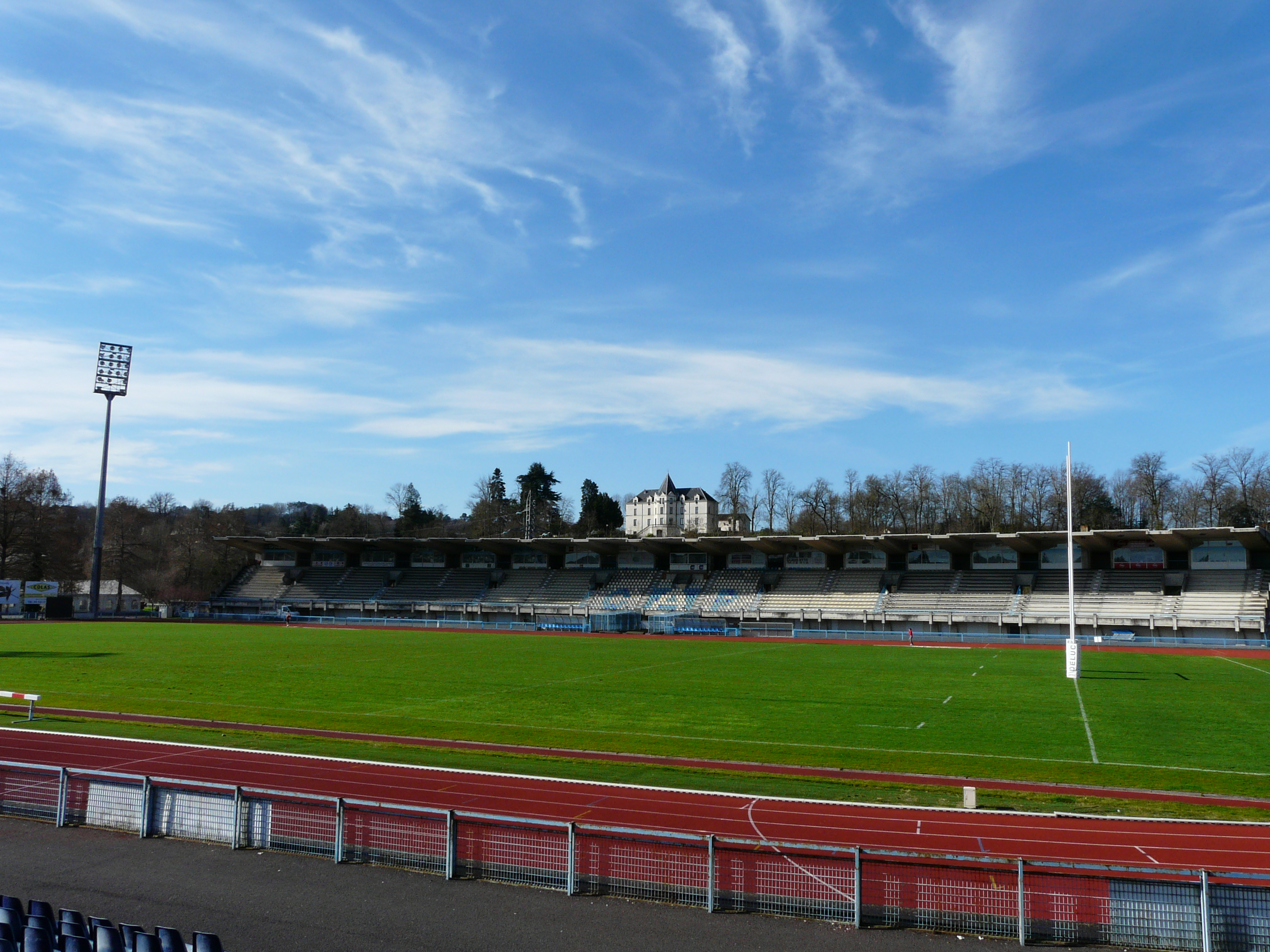
- Interactive map of Stade Francis-Rongiéras
- Full name: Le stade municipal Franci Rongiéras de Périgueux
- Location: Périgueux, France
- Coordinates: 45°11′29.61″N 0°41′59.77″E
- Owner: Municipality of Périgueux
- Capacity: 6,352
- Surface: grass
- Record attendance: 10,000 Trélissac FC - Olympique de Marseille Coupe de France, January 2010

Construction
- Opened: 1976
- Expanded: 2010

Stade Francis-Rongiéras is a multi-purpose stadium in Périgueux, France that is home to rugby union club CA Périgueux. It has a capacity of maximum capacity of 10,000 and opened in 1976. The stadium is named after Francis Rongiéras, a former captain of CA Périgueux that died in 1991 at the age of 33. It has a regular capacity of 6352.
