= Brandon Agounon =

Footballer (born 1994)

Personal information
- Date of birth: 19 October 1994 (age 32)
- Place of birth: Caen, France
- Height: 1.80 m (5 ft 11 in)
- Position: Midfielder

Team information
- Current team: Créteil
- Number: 28

Youth career
- –2012: Caen

Senior career*
Years	Team	Apps	(Gls)
2012	Caen B	2	(0)
2012–2018	Clermont B	38	(1)
2013–2018	Clermont	70	(1)
2017–2018	→ Boulogne (loan)	26	(1)
2018–2019	Ermis Aradippou		
2019–2020	Villefranche	21	(2)
2020–2022	Bourg-en-Bresse	57	(1)
2022–2024	Orléans	38	(0)
2024–2025	Châteauroux	27	(0)
2025–	Créteil	7	(1)

International career
2025–	Benin	1	(0)
- * Club domestic league appearances and goals as of 13 February 2026

Brandon Agounon (born 19 October 1994) is a professional footballer who plays as a midfielder for Championnat National 1 club Créteil. Born in France, he plays for the Benin national team.

== Club career ==
Agounon joined Clermont in 2012 from Caen. He made his Ligue 2 debut on 18 October 2013 against Nancy in a 3–2 away defeat. In August 2017, he was loaned to Boulogne for the 2017–18 season. He left in June 2018 to join Ermis Aradippou in Cyprus.

In June 2019, Agounon returned to France with Villefranche. In July 2020, he signed a two-year deal with Bourg-en-Bresse. In 2022, Agounon joined Orléans.

== International career ==
Born in France, Agounon was born to a Beninese father and Congolese mother. He has previously been called up by youth teams of DR Congo. In June 2023, he was called up to the Benin national team.
