= 2022–23 Coupe de France preliminary rounds, Occitanie =

The 2022–23 Coupe de France preliminary rounds, Occitanie is the qualifying competition to decide which teams from the leagues of the Occitanie region of France take part in the main competition from the seventh round.

A total of ten teams will qualify from the Occitanie preliminary rounds.

In 2021–22, seventh-tier Montauban FCTG progressed furthest in the competition, reaching the round of 64 as one of the joint-lowest ranked teams at that stage, before losing to fifth-tier La Roche VF in stoppage time.

== Draws and fixtures ==
The league published the first round draw on 19 July 2022, showing that a total of 496 teams had entered from the region, with 124 teams exempt beyond the first round. As in previous seasons, the draw for this round was made within individual districts of the league. The draw for the second round was published on 26 July 2022, with ties again drawn within individual districts of the league. The 106 teams from Régional 1 and below which were exempted from the first round, entered at this stage.

The third round draw was published on 31 August 2022, having been made a day earlier. The eleven teams from Championnat National 3 joined the competition at this stage. The fourth round draw was published on 14 September 2022, which saw the entry of the three teams from Championnat National 2.

The fifth round draw was published on 27 September 2022, and published a day later. The sixth round draw was published on 11 October 2022.

=== First round ===
These matches are from the Ariège district, and were played on 18 and 20 August 2022.

First round results: Occitanie (Ariège)
Tie no	Home team (tier)	Score	Away team (tier)
1.	FC Laroque d'Olmes (9)	3–0 (Note: Tie won by means of forfeit.)	FC Pays d'Olmes (10)
2.	FC Lézat (10)	1–7	ES Fossatoise (8)
3.	AS Rieux-de-Pelleport (9)	2–1	FC Coussa-Hers (9)
4.	EN Mazères (9)	0–4	FC Pamiers (8)
5.	Escosse FC (11)	2–2 (2–4 p)	AS Plantaurel (11)
6.	FC Saint-Girons (9)	3–2	FC Mirepoix 09 (8)

These matches are from the Aude district, and were played on 19 and 20 August 2022.

First round results: Occitanie (Aude)
Tie no	Home team (tier)	Score	Away team (tier)
1.	FC Cougaing (11)	0–3 (Note: Tie won by means of forfeit.)	MJC Gruissan (8)
2.	Trapel-Pennautier FC (10)	4–5	Entente Naurouze-Labastide (9)
3.	RC Badens Rustiques Aïgues-Vives (12)	1–4	AS Bram (9)
4.	USA Pezens (8)	2–1 (Note: USA Pezens penalised for fielding suspended players, ES Sainte-Eulalie-Villesèquelande.)	ES Sainte-Eulalie-Villesèquelande (9)
5.	US Minervois (9)	4–3	Olympique Montolieu Saissac Moussoulens (10)
6.	Olympique Les Martys (12)	0–5	FC Saint-Nazairois (10)
7.	AS Pexiora (10)	1–3	FC Briolet (8)
8.	FC Alzonne (9)	2–0	Olympic Cuxac-d'Aude (9)
9.	FC Caux-et-Sauzens (10)	1–1 (4–5 p)	FC Corbières Méditerranée (8)
10.	FC Malepère (10)	0–4	Olympique Corbières Sud Minervois (8)
11.	Limoux-Pieusse FC (10)	1–3	FC Alaric-Puichéric (10)
12.	UF Lézignanais (9)	5–0	ES Fanjeaux (10)
13.	FC Villegly (10)	5–3	US Villasavary (11)
14.	AS Espéraza (10)	1–3	UFC Narbonne (9)

These matches are from the Aveyron and Lozère districts, and were played on 18, 19, and 20 August 2022.

First round results: Occitanie (Aveyron and Lozère)
Tie no	Home team (tier)	Score	Away team (tier)
1.	Vaillante Aumonaise (12)	2–5	Marvejols Sports (10)
2.	AS Chanac (12)	10–1	Olympique Mont-Aigoual (12)
3.	ES Chirac-Le Monastier (11)	1–3	ESC Le Buisson (9)
4.	AS Chastelloise (11)	3–0 (Note: Tie won by means of forfeit.)	AS Le Malzieu (12)
5.	Valdonnez FC (13)	0–3	AS Badaroux (11)
6.	ES Rimeize (13)	4–2	AS Randonnaise (13)
7.	Ouest Aveyron Football (9)	2–1	US Argence/Viadène (10)
8.	AS Saint-Geniez-d'Olt (10)	0–3	US Réquistanaise (8)
9.	Olympique Martiel (11)	0–2	FC Monastère (8)
10.	Entente Costecalde Lestrade Broquiès (10)	4–6	Ségala-Rieupeyroux-Salvetat (8)
11.	Association Saint-Laurentaise Cantonale Canourguaise (10)	1–0	AS Aguessac (9)
12.	AS Soulages-Bonneval (10)	0–0 (3–2 p)	Entente Salles Curan/Curan (8)
13.	Stade Villefranchois (9)	1–0	US Montbazens Rignac (9)
14.	AO Bozouls (10)	2–2 (9–8 p)	US Dourdou (10)
15.	Pareloup Céor FC (11)	2–1	US Espalion (9)
16.	Foot Vallon (10)	0–5	Stade Saint-Affricain (8)
17.	FC Agen-Gages (11)	0–3	Espoir FC 88 (8)
18.	US Penchot Livinhac (11)	1–5 (Note: FC Naucellois penalised for fielding ineligible players, US Penchot Livinhac qualify.)	FC Naucellois (8)
19.	US Pays Alzuréen (10)	1–2	US Bas Rouergue (9)
20.	JS Lévézou (9)	1–0	FC Saint-Juéry (10)

These matches are from the Gard district, and were played on 19 and 20 August 2022.

First round results: Occitanie (Gard)
Tie no	Home team (tier)	Score	Away team (tier)
1.	RC Générac (9)	2–3	US Garons (10)
2.	US Peyrolaise (11)	1–1 (1–3 p)	AS Saint-Christol-lès-Alès (10)
3.	FC Bagnols Escanaux (11)	9–0	SA Cigalois (10)
4.	Olympique de Gaujac (11)	9–1	Boisset-et-Gaujac FC (12)
5.	Pays Viganais Aigoual FC (11)	4–1	ES Théziers (11)
6.	AS Beauvoisin (10)	0–2	US Trèfle (8)
7.	GC Quissac (11)	1–2	CO Soleil Levant Nîmes (8)
8.	SC Saint-Martin-de-Valgalgues (11)	3–0	Olympique Saintois (9)
9.	AS Auzonnet (12)	0–5	Omnisports Saint-Hilaire-La Jasse (10)
10.	Olympique Fourquésien (11)	1–4	ES Marguerittes (8)
11.	SC Manduellois (10)	1–1 (4–2 p)	ES Barjac (9)
12.	EF Vézénobres Cruviers (10)	3–1	ES Rochefort Signargues (11)
13.	FC Moussac (10)	0–0 (4–2 p)	FC Cabassut (9)
14.	US Monoblet (9)	0–1	CA Bessegeoise (10)
15.	RC Saint-Laurent-des-Arbres (11)	0–3 (Note: Tie won by means of forfeit.)	FC Val de Cèze (9)
16.	AEC Saint-Gilles (9)	3–3 (5–4 p)	AS Poulx (9)
17.	EJ Pays Grand Combien (12)	1–8	OC Redessan (9)
18.	AS Versoise (12)	0–3	AS Caissargues (10)
19.	AS Saint-Privat-des-Vieux (10)	1–4 (Note: AS Saint-Privat-des-Vieux penalised for fielding a suspended player. ES Suménoise qualify.)	ES Suménoise (9)
20.	FC Vatan (11)	2–2 (4–3 p)	US Pujaut (11)

These matches are from the Haute-Garonne district, and were played on 18, 19 and 20 August 2022.

First round results: Occitanie (Haute-Garonne)
Tie no	Home team (tier)	Score	Away team (tier)
1.	EFC Aurignac (10)	1–3	AS Mondonville (10)
2.	AS Hersoise (11)	2–1 (Note: Tie reversed from original draw.)	ÉF Montjoire-La Magdelaine (12)
3.	AO Cornebarrieu (9)	3–2	FC Launaguet (8)
4.	FC Autan (13)	0–3 (Note: Tie won by means of forfeit.)	JS Auzielle Lauzerville (10)
5.	JS Brax (10)	2–0	FC Roquettois (11)
6.	Coteaux Commingeois FC (11)	4–2	Toulouse Football Sud (12)
7.	Labège FC (9)	1–3	AS Toulouse Mirail (10)
8.	(Spain) UE Bossòst (11)	2–2 (4–2 p)	US Bagnères-de-Luchon Sports-Cierp-Gaud-Marignac (10)
9.	FC Merville (12)	2–5	ES Le Fousseret-Mondavezan (10)
10.	US Riveraine (11)	1–1 (5–6 p)	JS Cintegabelle (8)
11.	Toulouse Cheminots Marengo Sports (12)	2–6	US Léguevin (8)
12.	Lauragais FC (11)	2–2 (6–7 p)	JS Carbonne (8)
13.	Pyrénées Sud Comminges (11)	1–0	US Encausse-Soueich-Ganties (10)
14.	FC Eaunes/Labarthe-sur-Lèze (9)	0–10	AS Lavernose-Lherm-Mauzac (8)
15.	Olympique Montespan-Figarol (11)	0–4	Grenade FC (10)
16.	US Ramonville (11)	1–2	FC Mahorasis de Toulouse (12)
17.	FC Canal Nord (11)	3–2	FC Labarthe-Rivière (11)
18.	FC Mabroc (9)	1–2	FC Beauzelle (8)
19.	Football Algérien Toulousain (11)	3–0	Entente Landorthe-Labarthe-Estancarbon-Savarthès (10)
20.	AS Villemur (10)	3–0	Roques-Confluent Lacroix/Saubens/Pinsaguel (10)
21.	Fontenilles FC (11)	0–2	ES Saint-Simon (8)
22.	AF Villeneuvois (12)	3–0	Montastruc-de-Salies FC (11)
23.	FC Venerque Le Vernet (11)	1–4	JE Toulousaine Croix-Daurade (8)
24.	US Castelginest (8)	1–4	JS Toulouse Pradettes (8)
25.	FC Bagatelle (11)	4–2	Étoile Aussonnaise (8)
26.	Cap Jeunes 31 (13)	3–4	EF Castelmaurou Verfeil (10)
27.	AS Toulouse Lardenne (11)	3–0	SA Auterive (12)
28.	Toulouse Olympique Aviation Club (9)	3–2	UA Fenouillet (8)
29.	Lagardelle Miremont Sports (11)	1–2	ERCSO L'Isle-en-Dodon (9)
30.	AS Castelnau-d'Estrétefonds (8)	3–0	JAC Football 31 (13)
31.	SC Valentine (11)	1–4	AS Flourens Drémil-Lafage (11)
32.	CO Coteaux (13)	1–1 (5–6 p)	Toulouse ACF (10)
33.	US Bouloc Saint-Sauveur (11)	1–1 (3–1 p)	Saint-Lys Olympique FC (9)

These matches are from the Gers district, and were played on 17, 18, 19 and 20 August 2022.

First round results: Occitanie (Gers)
Tie no	Home team (tier)	Score	Away team (tier)
1.	US Aubiet (9)	3–1	AS Monferran-Savès (10)
2.	FC Mirandais (9)	4–0	US Duran (10)
3.	Sud Astarac 2010 (9)	1–1 (2–4 p)	Mauvezin FC (10)
4.	Eauze FC (10)	1–0	Cologne FC (9)
5.	Rassemblement Bas Armangnac FC (9)	6–4	Forza Labéjan-Saint-Jean-le-Comtal (9)
6.	FC Pavien (8)	7–0 (Note: Tie reversed from original draw.)	Lombez OFC (11)
7.	Sainte-Christie-Preignan AS (9)	1–0	SC Saint-Clar (9)
8.	JS Tougetoise (9)	0–3 (Note: Tie won by means of forfeit.)	AS Manciet (9)
9.	AS Ségoufielle (10)	0–2	UA Vic-Fezensac (8)

These matches are from the Hérault district, and were played on 19 and 20 August 2022.

First round results: Occitanie (Hérault)
Tie no	Home team (tier)	Score	Away team (tier)
1.	OF Thézan-Saint-Geniès (12)	1–6	AS Gignacois (9)
2.	US Montagnacoise (10)	4–1	ROC Social Sète (11)
3.	Olympique La Peyrade FC (9)	5–4	US Béziers (8)
4.	US Pougetoise (11)	1–3	Entente Corneilhan-Lignan (9)
5.	GS Saint-Aunès (12)	1–2	US Colombiers Nissan Méditerranée Via Domitia (12)
6.	AS Juvignac (10)	0–4	SC Saint-Thibérien (9)
7.	RC Lemasson Montpellier (11)	3–3 (2–3 p)	FC Sussargues-Berange (10)
8.	FC Pradéen (11)	0–2	ES Paulhan-Pézenas (9)
9.	AS Saint-Mathieu-de-Tréviers (11)	0–3 (Note: Tie won by means of forfeit.)	US Mauguio Carnon (8)
10.	SC Lodève (12)	0–3	AS Canet (10)
11.	FC Sauvian (12)	0–5	RC Vedasien (8)
12.	ASPTT Lunel (11)	0–4	US Villeneuvoise (11)
13.	AS Montarnaud-Saint-Paul-Vaihauques-Murviel (9)	1–2	AS Puissalicon-Magalas (9)
14.	CA Poussan (11)	3–0	US Basses Cévennes (12)
15.	Mèze Stade FC (8)	1–1 (1–4 p)	ES Pérols (8)
16.	Aurore Saint-Gilloise (9)	0–0 (5–4 p)	USO Florensac-Pinet (9)
17.	ASPTT Montpellier (11)	3–3 (7–6 p)	Avenir Castriote (11)
18.	AS Mireval (11)	2–2 (3–4 p)	FC Saint-Pargoire (11)
19.	FCO Viassois (11)	– (Note: FC Villeneuve-lès-Béziers penalised for fielding ineligible players, FCO Viassois qualify. Original scoreline unknown.)	FC Villeneuve-lès-Béziers (11)
20.	AS La Grande-Motte (11)	0–3	ES Coeur Hérault (11)
21.	FC Lavérune (10)	3–1	Jacou Clapiers FA (10)
22.	ES Cazouls-Maraussan-Maureilham (10)	4–0	Arceaux Montpellier (9)
23.	AC Alignanais (11)	3–0	Olympique Midi Lirou Capestang-Poilhes (11)
24.	AS Bessanaise (11)	1–3	FC Lespignan-Vendres (9)
25.	Montpeyroux FC (11)	2–2 (4–5 p)	Pointe Courte AC Sète (9)
26.	AS Saint-Martin Montpellier (12)	0–3	AS Valerguoise (11)
27.	Sète OFC (10)	0–3 (Note: Tie reversed from original draw.)	Arsenal Croix d'Argent (12)
28.	Baillargues-Saint-Brès-Valergues (9)	1–0	FC Lamalou-les-Bains (10)
29.	AS Pierrots Teyran (12)	0–3	RSO Cournonterral (11)

These matches are from the Lot district, and were played on 18, 19, 20 and 21 August 2022.

First round results: Occitanie (Lot)
Tie no	Home team (tier)	Score	Away team (tier)
1.	La Fortunière FC (10)	2–2 (7–8 p)	Entente Bleuets Lendou-Saint-Cyprien-Montcuq (9)
2.	FC Thédirac (11)	2–3	US Saint-Paul-de-Loubressac (11)
3.	FC Haut Quercy (9)	3–0	Entente Cajarc Cenevières (10)
4.	CA Salviacois (11)	0–0 (7–6 p)	Entente Cazals Montcléra (10)
5.	Puy-l'Évêque-Prayssac FC (10)	4–0	AS Causse Limargue (10)
6.	Foot Azur 96 (10)	1–1 (3–4 p)	FC Lalbenque-Fontanes (9)
7.	Les Cadets de l'Alzou Mayrinhacois (11)	0–3 (Note: Tie won by means of forfeit.)	US Puybrun Tauriac (10)
8.	US Nozacoise (11)	0–11	Bouriane FC (9)
9.	Haut Célé FC (9)	2–2 (2–4 p)	Entente Ségala Foot (9)
10.	US3C Catus (10)	1–3	Entente Souillac-La Chapelle-Gignac (9)
11.	FC Gréalou (10)	0–0 (5–3 p)	AS Montcabrier (9)
12.	Uxello FC Capdenac (11)	0–3	AS Livernon (11)

These matches are from the Hautes-Pyrénées district, and were played on 18, 19 and 20 August 2022.

First round results: Occitanie (Hautes-Pyrénées)
Tie no	Home team (tier)	Score	Away team (tier)
1.	FC Bordes (10)	0–4	FC Val d'Adour (8)
2.	FC Ibos-Ossun (10)	0–0 (7–6 p)	ASC Aureilhan (9)
3.	Horgues-Odos FC (9)	1–4	Séméac OFC (9)
4.	FC Bazillac (11)	0–3 (Note: Tie won by means of forfeit.)	US Tarbais Nouvelle Vague (9)
5.	ASC Barbazan-Debat (9)	2–5	FC des Nestes (9)
6.	US Marquisat Bénac (8)	1–3 (Note: Tie reversed from original draw.)	Juillan OS (8)
7.	US Côteaux (9)	1–2	FC Plateau-Lannezman (9)
8.	Boutons d'Or Ger (8)	2–2 (3–5 p)	FC Pyrénées/Vallées des Gaves (8)

These matches are from the Pyrénées-Orientales district, and were played on 20 August 2022.

First round results: Occitanie (Pyrénées-Orientales)
Tie no	Home team (tier)	Score	Away team (tier)
1.	FC Pia (12)	0–4	Salanca FC (9)
2.	AS Prades (12)	1–2	FC Villelongue (9)
3.	SO Rivesaltais (8)	4–1	FC Laurentin (9)
4.	ASPTT Pays Catalan (12)	0–6	Céret FC (10)
5.	FC Barcarès Méditerranée (11)	0–2	FC Saint-Cyprien (9)
6.	AF Catalan (8)	2–2 (5–6 p)	RC Perpignan Sud (9)
7.	Collioure-Port-Vendres FC (12)	0–1	FC Latour-Bas-Elne (12)
8.	FC Le Soler (9)	0–3	Les Amis de Cédric Brunier (9)

These matches are from the Tarn district, and were played on 18, 19 and 20 August 2022.

First round results: Occitanie (Tarn)
Tie no	Home team (tier)	Score	Away team (tier)
1.	AS Payrin-Rigautou (11)	2–2 (5–6 p)	ACS Labrespy (10)
2.	Cambounet FC (9)	1–0	AF Pays d'Oc 81 (10)
3.	Réalmont FC (9)	1–1 (2–4 p)	AS Vallée du Sor (10)
4.	US Mirandolaise (11)	0–4	US Gaillacois (8)
5.	AS Albigeoise (12)	7–0 (Note: AS Albigeoise penalised for fielding ineligible players, FC Puygouzon-Ranteil qualify.)	FC Puygouzon-Ranteil (11)
6.	FC Labastide-de-Lévis (11)	3–3 (10–11 p)	US Labruguièroise (10)
7.	Sporting Castres (12)	0–6	AS Giroussens (9)
8.	AS Lagrave (9)	0–0 (4–2 p)	FC Vignoble 81 (9)
9.	La Mygale Le Séquestre Football (9)	1–2	AJ Massalaise (10)
10.	La Cremade FC (9)	4–0	Sport Benfica Graulhet (10)
11.	AS Briatexte (10)	0–3	FC Pays Mazamétain (8)
12.	Les Copains d'Abord (9)	2–2 (4–5 p)	Valence OF (10)
13.	AS Pampelonnaise (9)	8–2	FC Castelnau-de-Lévis (9)
14.	US Carmaux (11)	0–3 (Note: Tie won by means of forfeit.)	US Valderiès (12)

These matches are from the Tarn-et-Garonne district, and were played on 18, 19 and 20 August 2022.

First round results: Occitanie (Tarn-et-Garonne)
Tie no	Home team (tier)	Score	Away team (tier)
1.	Stade Caussadais (10)	1–2	FC Nègrepelisse-Montricoux (8)
2.	US Réalville Cayra (11)	1–5	La Nicolaite (9)
3.	AS Bressols (8)	1–1 (4–2 p)	SC Lafrançaise (9)
4.	Corbarieu AC (12)	0–6	AS Mas-Grenier (8)
5.	FCUS Molières (9)	0–2	JS Meauzacaise (9)
6.	AS Pompignan (10)	1–1 (6–5 p)	Confluences FC (8)
7.	AS Stéphanoise (9)	1–3	JE Montalbanais (9)

=== Second round ===
These matches are from the Ariège district, and were played on 26, 27 and 28 August 2022.

Second round results: Occitanie (Ariège)
Tie no	Home team (tier)	Score	Away team (tier)
1.	FC Pamiers (8)	1–0	AS Rieux-de-Pelleport (9)
2.	ES Saint-Jean-du-Falga (9)	0–3	FC Saint-Girons (9)
3.	ES Fossatoise (8)	6–0	FC Laroque d'Olmes (9)
4.	Luzenac AP (6)	1–0	FC Foix (7)
5.	AS Plantaurel (11)	0–4	FC Saverdun (8)

These matches are from the Aude district, and were played on 28 August 2022.

Second round results: Occitanie (Aude)
Tie no	Home team (tier)	Score	Away team (tier)
1.	ES Sainte-Eulalie-Villesèquelande (9)	1–1 (2–1 p)	Entente Naurouze-Labastide (9)
2.	UFC Narbonne (9)	1–1 (1–3 p)	US Conques (7)
3.	FC Corbières Méditerranée (8)	1–1 (4–5 p)	FC Alzonne (9)
4.	Trèbes FC (7)	1–2	FA Carcassonne (6)
5.	US Minervois (9)	0–4	Haut-Minervois Olympique (8)
6.	FC Saint-Nazairois (10)	0–2	MJC Gruissan (8)
7.	AS Bram (9)	0–0 (3–4 p)	UF Lézignanais (9)
8.	FC Villegly (10)	3–3 (8–9 p)	CO Castelnaudary (7)
9.	FC Alaric-Puichéric (10)	0–4	FU Narbonne (6)
10.	Olympique Corbières Sud Minervois (8)	1–1 (6–5 p)	FC Briolet (8)

These matches are from the Aveyron and Lozère districts, and were played on 26, 27 and 28 August 2022.

Second round results: Occitanie (Aveyron and Lozère)
Tie no	Home team (tier)	Score	Away team (tier)
1.	AS Badaroux (11)	2–4	Luc Primaube FC (7)
2.	JS Lévézou (9)	1–0	AS Vabraise (10)
3.	US Penchot Livinhac (11)	1–0	AS Chastelloise (11)
4.	ESC Le Buisson (9)	1–3	Ouest Aveyron Football (9)
5.	US Bas Rouergue (9)	2–0	Stade Villefranchois (9)
6.	AS Chanac (12)	3–1	AS Soulages-Bonneval (10)
7.	Stade Saint-Affricain (8)	1–5	Druelle FC (8)
8.	SO Millau (8)	2–1	Entente Saint-Georges/Saint-Rome (9)
9.	Association Saint-Laurentaise Cantonale Canourguaise (10)	1–0	Ségala-Rieupeyroux-Salvetat (8)
10.	Marvejols Sports (10)	8–1	AO Bozouls (10)
11.	ES Rimeize (13)	0–11	US Réquistanaise (8)
12.	Pareloup Céor FC (11)	2–4	JS Bassin Aveyron (8)
13.	FC Sources de l'Aveyron (7)	3–0	Espoir FC 88 (8)
14.	FC Monastère (8)	2–5	FC Comtal (7)

These matches are from the Gard district, and were played on 27 and 28 August 2022.

Second round results: Occitanie (Gard)
Tie no	Home team (tier)	Score	Away team (tier)
1.	SC Manduellois (10)	2–4	AS Rousson (7)
2.	US Garons (10)	4–1	AEC Saint-Gilles (9)
3.	AS Caissargues (10)	1–2	FC Vauverdois (7)
4.	SC Saint-Martin-de-Valgalgues (11)	0–6	JS Chemin Bas d'Avignon (6)
5.	AF Lozère (6)	2–2 (4–3 p)	SO Aimargues (7)
6.	FC Vatan (11)	1–3	ES Pays d'Uzes (6)
7.	Omnisports Saint-Hilaire-La Jasse (10)	2–1	US Trèfle (8)
8.	FC Chusclan-Laudun-l'Ardoise (8)	1–3	Entente Perrier Vergèze (8)
9.	EF Vézénobres Cruviers (10)	1–2	FC Val de Cèze (9)
10.	FC Moussac (10)	2–0	FC Langlade (10)
11.	Olympique de Gaujac (11)	2–3	CO Soleil Levant Nîmes (8)
12.	OC Redessan (9)	1–0	AS Saint-Privat-des-Vieux (10)
13.	AS Saint-Christol-lès-Alès (10)	0–2	ES Grau-du-Roi (7)
14.	FC Bagnols Escanaux (11)	0–1	ES Marguerittes (8)
15.	CA Bessegeoise (10)	1–1 (3–2 p)	GC Uchaud (7)
16.	Pays Viganais Aigoual FC (11)	3–3 (5–4 p)	SC Anduzien (7)

These matches are from the Haute-Garonne district, and were played on 26, 27 and 28 August 2022.

Second round results: Occitanie (Haute-Garonne)
Tie no	Home team (tier)	Score	Away team (tier)
1.	JS Brax (10)	1–0	US Léguevin (8)
2.	Coteaux Commingeois FC (11)	4–3	JS Auzielle Lauzerville (10)
3.	JS Toulouse Pradettes (8)	1–1 (4–2 p)	Toulouse Olympique Aviation Club (9)
4.	AS Villemur (10)	2–2 (3–4 p)	Baziège OC (7)
5.	AF Villeneuvois (12)	0–7	Saint-Alban Aucamville FC (6)
6.	AS Hersoise (11)	2–4	Toulouse Rangueil FC (8)
7.	FC Beauzelle (8)	0–6	Toulouse Métropole FC (6)
8.	Toulouse Rodéo FC (6)	2–2 (7–8 p)	Juventus de Papus (7)
9.	ES Saint-Simon (8)	0–3	Avenir Fonsorbais (7)
10.	JE Toulousaine Croix-Daurade (8)	1–2	AS Lavernose-Lherm-Mauzac (8)
11.	JS Cintegabelle (8)	2–1	AS Portet-Carrefour-Récébédou (6)
12.	FC Mahorasis de Toulouse (12)	0–7	US Seysses-Frouzins (6)
13.	AS Toulouse Mirail (10)	2–4	JS Carbonne (8)
14.	Pyrénées Sud Comminges (11)	0–5	US Plaisance (6)
15.	Toulouse ACF (10)	1–3	US Salies-du-Salat/Mane/Saint-Martory (6)
16.	US Bouloc Saint-Sauveur (11)	2–2 (5–4 p)	US Pouvourville (7)
17.	EF Castelmaurou Verfeil (10)	4–0	AS Castelnau-d'Estrétefonds (8)
18.	ERCSO L'Isle-en-Dodon (9)	0–0 (2–4 p)	Olympique Girou FC (6)
19.	AS Flourens Drémil-Lafage (11)	0–5	AS Muret (6)
20.	Comminges Saint-Gaudens (7)	1–1 (3–4 p)	AS Tournefeuille (7)
21.	AS Toulouse Lardenne (11)	0–3 (Note: Tie won by means of forfeit.)	US Revel (7)
22.	Football Algérien Toulousain (11)	0–5	AO Cornebarrieu (9)
23.	ES Le Fousseret-Mondavezan (10)	0–3	US Pibrac (6)
24.	FC Canal Nord (11)	0–0 (4–3 p)	UE Bossòst (11) (Spain)
25.	FC Bagatelle (11)	0–3	Saint-Orens FC (7)
26.	AS Mondonville (10)	0–2	Blagnac FC (6)
27.	JS Cugnaux (7)	4–0	US Cazères (6)
28.	Grenade FC (10)	0–1	Entente Boulogne-Péguilhan (7)

These matches are from the Gers district, and were played on 26, 27 and 28 August 2022.

Second round results: Occitanie (Gers)
Tie no	Home team (tier)	Score	Away team (tier)
1.	AS Fleurance-La Sauvetat (8)	1–1 (3–4 p)	FC Mirandais (9)
2.	FC Pavien (8)	1–5	Auch Football (6)
3.	ES Gimontoise (9)	3–0 (Note: Tie won by means of forfeit.)	AS Manciet (9)
4.	Sainte-Christie-Preignan AS (9)	1–3	FC L'Islois (8)
5.	UA Vic-Fezensac (8)	3–4	US Aignanais (9)
6.	Mauvezin FC (10)	1–5	Rassemblement Bas Armangnac FC (9)
7.	US Aubiet (9)	3–0	Eauze FC (10)

These matches are from the Hérault district, and were played on 27 and 28 August 2022.

Second round results: Occitanie (Hérault)
Tie no	Home team (tier)	Score	Away team (tier)
1.	AS Valerguoise (11)	0–2	RC Vedasien (8)
2.	AS Canet (10)	7–1	FC Lavérune (10)
3.	FCO Viassois (11)	2–6	CE Palavas (7)
4.	CA Poussan (11)	1–2	La Clermontaise Football (6)
5.	US Villeneuvoise (11)	5–0	RSO Cournonterral (11)
6.	FC Lespignan-Vendres (9)	2–3	AS Puissalicon-Magalas (9)
7.	ES Cazouls-Maraussan-Maureilham (10)	0–1	AS Lattoise (7)
8.	AS Fabrègues (6)	0–2	GC Lunel (6)
9.	Castelnau Le Crès FC (6)	1–0	AS Pignan (7)
10.	FC Saint-Pargoire (11)	1–10	AS Atlas Paillade (6)
11.	ASPTT Montpellier (11)	0–3	FC Petit Bard (7)
12.	FC Sussargues-Berange (10)	1–0	Aurore Saint-Gilloise (9)
13.	Olympique La Peyrade FC (9)	3–0	AS Méditerrannée 34 (7)
14.	ES Coeur Hérault (11)	2–2 (5–6 p)	FC Thongue et Libron (10)
15.	AC Alignanais (11)	0–5	ES Pérols (8)
16.	AS Gignacois (9)	3–1	Stade Balarucois (7)
17.	Arsenal Croix d'Argent (12)	1–5	ES Paulhan-Pézenas (9)
18.	PI Vendargues (6)	2–1	AS Frontignan AC (6)
19.	US Mauguio Carnon (8)	1–2	Baillargues-Saint-Brès-Valergues (9)
20.	US Colombiers Nissan Méditerranée Via Domitia (12)	2–3	SC Saint-Thibérien (9)
21.	Pointe Courte AC Sète (9)	4–0	US Montagnacoise (10)
22.	Entente Corneilhan-Lignan (9)	2–3	FO Sud Hérault (8)
23.	Olympique Saint-André-de-Sangonis (8)	0–5	Entente Saint-Clément-Montferrier (6)

These matches are from the Lot district, and were played on 28 August 2022.

Second round results: Occitanie (Lot)
Tie no	Home team (tier)	Score	Away team (tier)
1.	FC Lalbenque-Fontanes (9)	4–0	FC Gréalou (10)
2.	FC Haut Quercy (9)	1–8	FC Biars-Bretenoux (6)
3.	US Puybrun Tauriac (10)	1–3	Pradines-Saint-Vincent-Douelle-Mercuès Olt (8)
4.	Bouriane FC (9)	1–3	Entente Souillac-La Chapelle-Gignac (9)
5.	Entente Bleuets Lendou-Saint-Cyprien-Montcuq (9)	0–0 (4–3 p)	Val Roc Foot (9)
6.	Puy-l'Évêque-Prayssac FC (10)	4–1 (Note: Match abandoned in the second half after a clash between two players degenerated into a general fight. A CA Salviacois player was injured during the brawl, leading to the Salviac team returning to the changing rooms. CA Salviacois were subsequently penalised, Puy-l'Évêque-Prayssac FC qualify.)	CA Salviacois (11)
7.	AS Livernon (11)	1–3	Élan Marivalois (8)
8.	Figeac Capdenac Quercy FC (7)	2–1	Cahors FC (7)
9.	US Saint-Paul-de-Loubressac (11)	2–0	Entente Ségala Foot (9)

These matches are from the Hautes-Pyrénées district, and were played on 27 and 28 August 2022.

Second round results: Occitanie (Hautes-Pyrénées)
Tie no	Home team (tier)	Score	Away team (tier)
1.	Quand Même Orleix (8)	4–0	Elan Pyrénéen Bazet-Bordères-Lagarde (9)
2.	FC Plateau-Lannezman (9)	0–1	Tarbes Pyrénées Football (6)
3.	FC Pyrénées/Vallées des Gaves (8)	0–1	Soues Cigognes FC (7)
4.	US Tarbais Nouvelle Vague (9)	1–1 (4–5 p)	FC Ibos-Ossun (10)
5.	Séméac OFC (9)	2–5	FC Lourdais XI (6)
6.	FC Val d'Adour (8)	1–1 (4–3 p)	ES Haut Adour (8)
7.	FC des Nestes (9)	1–1 (4–1 p)	Juillan OS (8)

These matches are from the Pyrénées-Orientales district, and were played on 28 August 2022.

Second round results: Occitanie (Pyrénées-Orientales)
Tie no	Home team (tier)	Score	Away team (tier)
1.	FC Saint-Cyprien (9)	1–4	SO Rivesaltais (8)
2.	Salanca FC (9)	6–0	Céret FC (10)
3.	FC Thuirinois (9)	0–1	Baho-Pézilla FC (8)
4.	FC Villelongue (9)	5–0	BECE FC Vallée de l'Aigly (10)
5.	RC Perpignan Sud (9)	1–0	Sporting Perpignan Nord (8)
6.	FC Latour-Bas-Elne (12)	0–10	Union Saint-Estève Espoir Perpignan Méditerannée Métropole (6)
7.	OC Perpignan (7)	0–0 (5–4 p)	Les Amis de Cédric Brunier (9)

These matches are from the Tarn district, and were played on 26, 27 and 28 August 2022.

Second round results: Occitanie (Tarn)
Tie no	Home team (tier)	Score	Away team (tier)
1.	US Gaillacois (8)	0–3	US Castres (8)
2.	AS Giroussens (9)	2–1	Cambounet FC (9)
3.	AS Lagrave (9)	0–2	US Saint-Sulpice (7)
4.	US Autan (10)	1–0	Saint-Juéry OF (7)
5.	Valence OF (10)	0–5	FC Graulhet (7)
6.	US Albi (8)	5–1	AS Pampelonnaise (9)
7.	US Labruguièroise (10)	0–3	La Cremade FC (9)
8.	US Valderiès (12)	0–3	ACS Labrespy (10)
9.	FC Pays Mazamétain (8)	1–1 (4–3 p)	Lavaur FC (7)
10.	AS Vallée du Sor (10)	3–1	AJ Massalaise (10)
11.	Albi Marssac Tarn Football ASPTT (7)	13–0 (Note: Tie reversed from original draw.)	FC Puygouzon-Ranteil (11)

These matches are from the Tarn-et-Garonne district, and were played on 26, 27 and 28 August 2022.

Second round results: Occitanie (Tarn-et-Garonne)
Tie no	Home team (tier)	Score	Away team (tier)
1.	AS Bressols (8)	0–2	Montauban FCTG (7)
2.	AS Mas-Grenier (8)	3–2	FC Nègrepelisse-Montricoux (8)
3.	FC Lomagne 82 (9)	0–0 (5–4 p)	Cazes Olympique (7)
4.	JS Meauzacaise (9)	2–1	AA Grisolles (7)
5.	JE Montalbanais (9)	3–2	AS Pompignan (10)
6.	La Nicolaite (9)	2–7	FC 2 Rives 82 (6)

=== Third round ===
These matches were played on 10 and 11 September 2022.

Third round results: Occitanie
Tie no	Home team (tier)	Score	Away team (tier)
1.	US Villeneuvoise (11)	0–0 (2–4 p)	FC Sources de l'Aveyron (7)
2.	FC Moussac (10)	2–0	OC Redessan (9)
3.	FC Vauverdois (7)	0–3	FC Bagnols Pont (5)
4.	Omnisports Saint-Hilaire-La Jasse (10)	1–2	CA Bessegeoise (10)
5.	SO Millau (8)	1–3	GC Lunel (6)
6.	FC Sussargues-Berange (10)	2–4	AF Lozère (6)
7.	US Garons (10)	0–2	US Salinières Aigues Mortes (5)
8.	FC Petit Bard (7)	2–2 (4–3 p)	Entente Saint-Clément-Montferrier (6)
9.	FC Val de Cèze (9)	1–1 (3–1 p)	ES Pérols (8)
10.	Pays Viganais Aigoual FC (11)	1–1 (5–4 p)	ES Pays d'Uzes (6)
11.	Baillargues-Saint-Brès-Valergues (9)	1–5	Stade Beaucairois (5)
12.	Marvejols Sports (10)	0–4	ES Grau-du-Roi (7)
13.	ES Marguerittes (8)	1–1 (0–3 p)	JS Chemin Bas d'Avignon (6)
14.	Entente Perrier Vergèze (8)	6–1	CO Soleil Levant Nîmes (8)
15.	AS Chanac (12)	0–4	RC Vedasien (8)
16.	Association Saint-Laurentaise Cantonale Canourguaise (10)	2–3	AS Rousson (7)
17.	CE Palavas (7)	1–1 (1–4 p)	Union Saint-Estève Espoir Perpignan Méditerannée Métropole (6)
18.	Olympique La Peyrade FC (9)	3–2	OC Perpignan (7)
19.	SO Rivesaltais (8)	1–2	FC Alberes Argelès (5)
20.	AS Lattoise (7)	4–4 (3–0 p)	Haut-Minervois Olympique (8)
21.	Salanca FC (9)	1–3	Castelnau Le Crès FC (6)
22.	MJC Gruissan (8)	1–1 (4–3 p)	La Clermontaise Football (6)
23.	AS Canet (10)	2–1	Baho-Pézilla FC (8)
24.	ES Paulhan-Pézenas (9)	1–0	RC Perpignan Sud (9)
25.	AS Gignacois (9)	2–2 (6–5 p)	CO Castelnaudary (7)
26.	AS Puissalicon-Magalas (9)	3–2	AS Atlas Paillade (6)
27.	FO Sud Hérault (8)	2–1	PI Vendargues (6)
28.	FC Thongue et Libron (10)	1–3	US Conques (7)
29.	SC Saint-Thibérien (9)	2–4	FU Narbonne (6)
30.	Pointe Courte AC Sète (9)	1–6	RCO Agde (5)
31.	FC Villelongue (9)	3–3 (5–3 p)	Olympique Corbières Sud Minervois (8)
32.	ACS Labrespy (10)	1–3	Baziège OC (7)
33.	FC Saint-Girons (9)	0–6	AS Muret (6)
34.	AS Vallée du Sor (10)	0–3	Saint-Orens FC (7)
35.	FC Saverdun (8)	0–1	US Pibrac (6)
36.	FC Pamiers (8)	0–1	FA Carcassonne (6)
37.	FC Alzonne (9)	1–1 (2–3 p)	La Cremade FC (9)
38.	Juventus de Papus (7)	3–1	US Castres (8)
39.	UF Lézignanais (9)	1–1 (3–5 p) (Note: Tie reversed from original draw.)	US Autan (10)
40.	US Seysses-Frouzins (6)	1–2	US Castanéenne (5)
41.	JS Cintegabelle (8)	1–1 (5–3 p)	JS Toulouse Pradettes (8)
42.	US Revel (7)	1–2	AS Lavernose-Lherm-Mauzac (8)
43.	ES Sainte-Eulalie-Villesèquelande (9)	0–4	AS Béziers (5)
44.	FC Pays Mazamétain (8)	0–3	Luzenac AP (6)
45.	AO Cornebarrieu (9)	2–2 (4–3 p)	ES Fossatoise (8)
46.	EF Castelmaurou Verfeil (10)	1–7	JS Cugnaux (7)
47.	FC Canal Nord (11)	2–5	Quand Même Orleix (8)
48.	Soues Cigognes FC (7)	2–1	AS Tournefeuille (7)
49.	JS Meauzacaise (9)	2–0	FC Val d'Adour (8)
50.	ES Gimontoise (9)	1–3	Avenir Fonsorbais (7)
51.	FC Lomagne 82 (9)	1–3	US Colomiers Football (5)
52.	Entente Boulogne-Péguilhan (7)	1–3	JS Carbonne (8)
53.	Toulouse Rangueil FC (8)	5–2	FC des Nestes (9)
54.	US Plaisance (6)	0–1	Montauban FCTG (7)
55.	FC Mirandais (9)	0–5	JS Brax (10)
56.	JE Montalbanais (9)	0–7	Tarbes Pyrénées Football (6)
57.	US Aignanais (9)	1–0	US Aubiet (9)
58.	Rassemblement Bas Armangnac FC (9)	0–6	Blagnac FC (6)
59.	Auch Football (6)	0–3	FC Lourdais XI (6)
60.	Coteaux Commingeois FC (11)	1–2	FC L'Islois (8)
61.	AS Mas-Grenier (8)	1–2	Union Saint-Jean FC (5)
62.	FC Ibos-Ossun (10)	0–2	US Salies-du-Salat/Mane/Saint-Martory (6)
63.	US Bas Rouergue (9)	1–5	FC 2 Rives 82 (6)
64.	US Penchot Livinhac (11)	1–5	Olympique Girou FC (6)
65.	FC Graulhet (7)	1–2	Balma SC (5)
66.	Druelle FC (8)	0–1	FC Biars-Bretenoux (6)
67.	Entente Souillac-La Chapelle-Gignac (9)	0–3	JS Lévézou (9)
68.	AS Giroussens (9)	3–1	Entente Bleuets Lendou-Saint-Cyprien-Montcuq (9)
69.	FC Lalbenque-Fontanes (9)	1–7	US Saint-Sulpice (7)
70.	Puy-l'Évêque-Prayssac FC (10)	1–2	US Réquistanaise (8)
71.	US Saint-Paul-de-Loubressac (11)	0–9	Luc Primaube FC (7)
72.	FC Comtal (7)	4–1	JS Bassin Aveyron (8)
73.	Onet-le-Château Football (5)	4–0	US Albi (8)
74.	US Bouloc Saint-Sauveur (11)	1–1 (3–5 p)	Ouest Aveyron Football (9)
75.	Élan Marivalois (8)	0–1	Toulouse Métropole FC (6)
76.	Pradines-Saint-Vincent-Douelle-Mercuès Olt (8)	2–3	Saint-Alban Aucamville FC (6)
77.	Albi Marssac Tarn Football ASPTT (7)	4–1	Figeac Capdenac Quercy FC (7)

=== Fourth round ===
These matches were played on 24 and 25 September 2022.

Fourth round results: Occitanie
Tie no	Home team (tier)	Score	Away team (tier)
1.	ES Paulhan-Pézenas (9)	4–1	FC Val de Cèze (9)
2.	MJC Gruissan (8)	0–3	US Salinières Aigues Mortes (5)
3.	FU Narbonne (6)	3–2	ES Grau-du-Roi (7)
4.	FC Moussac (10)	0–6	RCO Agde (5)
5.	US Conques (7)	1–7	Olympique Alès (4)
6.	FC Sources de l'Aveyron (7)	1–2	AF Lozère (6)
7.	RC Vedasien (8)	0–2	JS Chemin Bas d'Avignon (6)
8.	CA Bessegeoise (10)	0–2	Entente Perrier Vergèze (8)
9.	FC Petit Bard (7)	3–3 (5–3 p)	FC Bagnols Pont (5)
10.	Union Saint-Estève Espoir Perpignan Méditerannée Métropole (6)	3–0	AS Lattoise (7)
11.	Olympique La Peyrade FC (9)	3–1	AS Gignacois (9)
12.	Castelnau Le Crès FC (6)	1–1 (5–4 p)	GC Lunel (6)
13.	Pays Viganais Aigoual FC (11)	0–1	Stade Beaucairois (5)
14.	AS Rousson (7)	2–0	FO Sud Hérault (8)
15.	FC Villelongue (9)	1–2	Union Saint-Jean FC (5)
16.	La Cremade FC (9)	1–4	JS Cugnaux (7)
17.	Avenir Fonsorbais (7)	1–1 (6–5 p)	Luzenac AP (6)
18.	Toulouse Métropole FC (6)	3–2	FC Sète 34 (4)
19.	AS Canet (10)	0–6	FC Alberes Argelès (5)
20.	AS Lavernose-Lherm-Mauzac (8)	2–1	AS Giroussens (9)
21.	US Castanéenne (5)	2–2 (4–1 p)	US Pibrac (6)
22.	JS Carbonne (8)	0–2	FA Carcassonne (6)
23.	AS Puissalicon-Magalas (9)	3–1	Baziège OC (7)
24.	Juventus de Papus (7)	1–0	Toulouse Rangueil FC (8)
25.	AO Cornebarrieu (9)	2–3	Olympique Girou FC (6)
26.	Saint-Orens FC (7)	1–0	JS Cintegabelle (8)
27.	AS Muret (6)	2–1	AS Béziers (5)
28.	Blagnac FC (6)	2–0	Albi Marssac Tarn Football ASPTT (7)
29.	JS Lévézou (9)	0–1	US Colomiers Football (5)
30.	FC Comtal (7)	0–1	Balma SC (5)
31.	Tarbes Pyrénées Football (6)	1–1 (5–6 p)	Canet Roussillon FC (4)
32.	Luc Primaube FC (7)	0–0 (4–3 p)	US Réquistanaise (8)
33.	FC 2 Rives 82 (6)	2–1	FC Lourdais XI (6)
34.	Onet-le-Château Football (5)	2–2 (5–4 p)	Saint-Alban Aucamville FC (6)
35.	Quand Même Orleix (8)	1–0	US Aignanais (9)
36.	JS Brax (10)	3–0	FC L'Islois (8)
37.	US Salies-du-Salat/Mane/Saint-Martory (6)	0–0 (4–2 p)	Soues Cigognes FC (7)
38.	US Autan (10)	0–3	Montauban FCTG (7)
39.	Ouest Aveyron Football (9)	0–2	FC Biars-Bretenoux (6)
40.	JS Meauzacaise (9)	0–3	US Saint-Sulpice (7)

=== Fifth round ===
These matches were played on 8 and 9 October 2022.

Fifth round results: Occitanie
Tie no	Home team (tier)	Score	Away team (tier)
1.	RCO Agde (5)	2–0	Union Saint-Jean FC (5)
2.	Saint-Orens FC (7)	0–2	Canet Roussillon FC (4)
3.	FA Carcassonne (6)	4–1	US Saint-Sulpice (7)
4.	JS Brax (10)	1–1 (3–4 p)	Blagnac FC (6)
5.	AS Muret (6)	2–1 (Note: Match abandoned by the referee after he was spat at by a supporter, following objects being thrown. AS Muret penalised, FC 2 Rives 82 qualify.)	FC 2 Rives 82 (6)
6.	ES Paulhan-Pézenas (9)	1–0	Castelnau Le Crès FC (6)
7.	Balma SC (5)	2–1	US Castanéenne (5)
8.	AS Puissalicon-Magalas (9)	1–4	Union Saint-Estève Espoir Perpignan Méditerannée Métropole (6)
9.	Montauban FCTG (7)	6–0	Quand Même Orleix (8)
10.	JS Cugnaux (7)	2–4	Toulouse Métropole FC (6)
11.	FC Biars-Bretenoux (6)	4–1	Avenir Fonsorbais (7)
12.	Olympique Girou FC (6)	0–4	Olympique Alès (4)
13.	AS Rousson (7)	2–2 (11–12 p)	US Salies-du-Salat/Mane/Saint-Martory (6)
14.	Stade Beaucairois (5)	0–2	US Colomiers Football (5)
15.	AS Lavernose-Lherm-Mauzac (8)	2–3	FU Narbonne (6)
16.	AF Lozère (6)	0–0 (4–2 p)	JS Chemin Bas d'Avignon (6)
17.	Juventus de Papus (7)	0–2	Onet-le-Château Football (5)
18.	Luc Primaube FC (7)	2–3	FC Alberes Argelès (5)
19.	FC Petit Bard (7)	1–5 (Note: Match abandoned by the referee near the end, due to behaviour of supporters. FC Petit Bard penalised, US Salinières Aigues Mortes qualify.)	US Salinières Aigues Mortes (5)
20.	Entente Perrier Vergèze (8)	2–0	Olympique La Peyrade FC (9)

These matches were played on 15 and 16 October 2022.

Sixth round results: Occitanie
Tie no	Home team (tier)	Score	Away team (tier)
1.	Montauban FCTG (7)	1–1 (5–4 p)	Balma SC (5)
2.	ES Paulhan-Pézenas (9)	0–1	FU Narbonne (6)
3.	US Salinières Aigues Mortes (5)	2–1	FC 2 Rives 82 (6)
4.	Onet-le-Château Football (5)	2–1	Blagnac FC (6)
5.	Toulouse Métropole FC (6)	0–3	RCO Agde (5)
6.	US Salies-du-Salat/Mane/Saint-Martory (6)	0–3	FC Alberes Argelès (5)
7.	AF Lozère (6)	2–2 (5–6 p)	Olympique Alès (4)
8.	FC Biars-Bretenoux (6)	1–1 (4–3 p)	FA Carcassonne (6)
9.	US Colomiers Football (5)	1–0	Canet Roussillon FC (4)
10.	Entente Perrier Vergèze (8)	2–2 (2–4 p)	Union Saint-Estève Espoir Perpignan Méditerannée Métropole (6)
