= 2023–24 Coupe de France preliminary rounds, Occitanie =

The 2023–24 Coupe de France preliminary rounds, Occitanie is the qualifying competition to decide which teams from the leagues of the Occitanie region of France take part in the main competition from the seventh round.

A total of ten teams will qualify from the Occitanie section of the 2023–24 Coupe de France preliminary rounds.

In 2022–23, seventh-tier Montauban FCTG reached the eighth-round stage for the second successive season, along with three other teams from the regional qualifying rounds: sixth-tier Union Saint-Estève Espoir Perpignan Méditerannée Métropole, and fifth tier duo Onet-le-Château Football and US Colomiers Football. Montauban FCTG were heavily beaten by Nîmes in a game interrupted by crowd trouble. Saint-Estève lost on penalties to Hyères FC. Colomiers and Onet-le-Château both lost, by a single goal, to Pau FC and RC Grasse respectively.

== Draws and fixtures ==
On 18 July 2023, the league announced that 490 teams from the region had entered the competition, and that 376 teams from the district divisions and Régional 3 would enter at the first round stage, with 30 teams from these levels exempt to the second round based on the number of teams in each district and their progress in the competition last season. On the same day, the draw for the first two rounds took place live on the league's Facebook page. Although the draw for all ties took place at the same time, the outcome was still published district by district.

The third round draw, featuring the 9 teams from Championnat National 3, was published on 5 September 2023. The fourth round draw, featuring the 2 teams from Championnat National 2, was published on 19 September 2023. The fifth round draw, which saw the one team from Championnat National join the competition, was published on 4 October 2023. The sixth and final regional round was drawn on 18 October 2023.

=== First round ===
These matches are from the Ariège district, and were played on 26 and 27 August 2023.

First Round Results: Occitanie (Ariège)
Tie no	Home team (Tier)	Score	Away team (Tier)
1.	Escosse FC (10)	0–2	US Lescure (9)
2.	FC Pays d'Olmes (10)	0–3 (Note: Tie won by means of forfeit.)	AS Rieux-de-Pelleport (9)
3.	FC Coussa-Hers (9)	2–0	FC Foix (9)
4.	ES Saint-Jean-du-Falga (9)	5–2	EN Mazères (9)
5.	Entente Varilhes-Saint-Jean-de-Verges (9)	0–3	FC Mirepoix 09 (8)
6.	FC Laroque d'Olmes (9)	2–5	FC Saint-Girons (8)

These matches are from the Aude district, and were played on 27 August 2023.

First Round Results: Occitanie (Aude)
Tie no	Home team (Tier)	Score	Away team (Tier)
1.	RC Pieusse (11)	2–4 (Note: FC Saint-Nazairois penalised for firelding a suspended player, RC Pieusse qualify.)	FC Saint-Nazairois (9)
2.	Limoux FC (10)	2–2 (6–7 p)	ES Sainte-Eulalie-Villesèquelande (10)
3.	FC Villegly (9)	1–1 (0–3 p)	USA Pezens (9)
4.	Olympique Les Martys (12)	3–9	FC Briolet (8)
5.	RC Badens Rustiques Aïgues-Vives (12)	0–5	AS Bram (10)
6.	SC Narbonne Montplaisir (12)	1–8	UF Lézignanais (9)
7.	US Montagne Noir (11)	0–3	FC Corbières Méditerranée (8)
8.	FC Cougaing (11)	1–0	FC Malepère (10)
9.	Trapel-Pennautier FC (10)	4–1	FC Quillan (11)
10.	US Minervois (9)	0–7	Entente Naurouze-Labastide (8)
11.	ES Fanjeaux (10)	0–5 (Note: Tie reversed from original draw.)	Olympic Cuxac-d'Aude (9)
12.	Leucate FC (12)	1–0	FC Alzonne (9)
13.	AS Espéraza (10)	1–1 (5–4 p)	AS Pexiora (10)
14.	Razès Olympique (10)	3–1	FC Chalabre (10)

These matches are from the Aveyron district, and were played on 25, 26, 27 and 30 August 2023.

First Round Results: Occitanie (Aveyron)
Tie no	Home team (Tier)	Score	Away team (Tier)
1.	SO Millau (8)	3–0	JS Bassin Aveyron (8)
2.	Association Saint-Laurentaise Cantonale Canourguaise (10)	2–0	Foot Vallon (10)
3.	US Tournemire-Roquefort (12)	1–3	JS Rance Rougier (10)
4.	AS Soulages-Bonneval (11)	2–5	US Montbazens Rignac (8)
5.	Pareloup Céor FC (10)	0–3	FC Naucellois (9)
6.	US Pays Alzuréen (11)	2–0	AS Olemps (10)
7.	US Espalion (9)	3–3 (4–5 p)	FC Monastère (8)
8.	US Argence/Viadène (10)	3–0	Stade Villefranchois (10)
9.	Entente Costecalde Lestrade Broquiès (10)	2–1	Ségala-Rieupeyroux-Salvetat (9)
10.	Union Haut Lévézou (12)	3–5	AO Bozouls (10)
11.	Inter du Causse Bezonnes (11)	0–2	AS Saint-Geniez-d'Olt (9)
12.	AS Vabraise (11)	0–6	AS Aguessac (9)
13.	ÉS Combes (10)	0–5	US Bas Rouergue (9)
14.	Entente Saint-Georges/Saint-Rome (9)	0–3	Stade Saint-Affricain (8)
15.	Entente Salles Curan/Curan (9)	0–2	Espoir FC 88 (8)

These matches are from the Gard district, and were played on 27 August 2023.

First Round Results: Occitanie (Gard)
Tie no	Home team (Tier)	Score	Away team (Tier)
1.	Olympique de Gaujac (11)	1–4	ES Barjac (9)
2.	All Five Académie (11)	2–0	AEC Saint-Gilles (8)
3.	Calvisson FC (11)	1–6	US Monoblet (8)
4.	US Trèfle (9)	1–2	FC Val de Cèze (9)
5.	FC Cabassut (9)	1–3	RC Générac (9)
6.	JSO Aubord (12)	2–5	ES Marguerittes (8)
7.	AS Beauvoisin (10)	3–1 (Note: Tie reversed from original draw.)	FC Tavel (12)
8.	FC Saint-Alexandre Olympique (12)	0–12	SC Saint-Martin-de-Valgalgues (10)
9.	SC Nîmois (11)	2–1	OC Redessan (10)
10.	ES Théziers (11)	0–2	AS Saint-Christol-lès-Alès (10)
11.	ES Rochefort Signargues (11)	0–3	EF Vézénobres Cruviers (10)
12.	US Garons (10)	0–4	ES Suménoise (9)
13.	FC Chusclan-Laudun-l'Ardoise (8)	3–1	Olympique Saintois (9)
14.	SA Cigalois (11)	1–3	SC Manduellois (10)
15.	Sedisud FC (11)	4–4 (5–3 p)	Omnisports Saint-Hilaire-La Jasse (11)
16.	AS Saint-Privat-des-Vieux (10)	9–0	GC Quissac (11)
17.	Pays Viganais Aigoual FC (10)	6–1	FCO Domessargues (11)
18.	CO Soleil Levant Nîmes (9)	0–3	Stade Sainte-Barbe (9)
19.	AS Bagard (12)	0–2	AS Poulx (10)
20.	FC Bagnols Escanaux (11)	0–3	Olympique Fourquésien (10)
21.	Boisset-et-Gaujac FC (12)	0–11	FC Moussac (10)
22.	FC Langlade (10)	0–1	SC Anduzien (8)
23.	AS Caissargues (10)	3–0	FC Vacquerolles (11)

These matches are from the Haute-Garonne district, and were played on 26 and 27 August 2023.

First Round Results: Occitanie (Haute-Garonne)
Tie no	Home team (Tier)	Score	Away team (Tier)
1.	ESÉ Saint-Jory (12)	0–3	UA Fenouillet (8)
2.	US Miramont (11)	2–3	Toulouse Football Compans Caffarelli (10)
3.	Saint-Orens FC (8)	0–1	Avenir Fonsorbais (8)
4.	Coteaux Commingeois FC (11)	0–3 (Note: Tie won by means of forfeit.)	Toulouse Olympique Aviation Club (9)
5.	AS Hersoise (11)	2–2 (3–2 p)	JS Toulouse Pradettes (8)
6.	US Auriacaise (12)	1–3	Entente Landorthe-Labarthe-Estancarbon-Savarthès (9)
7.	US Rieux-Volvestre (11)	0–4	FC MAS 31 (8)
8.	Saint-Lys Olympique FC (9)	1–2	Labège FC (9)
9.	Entente US Bérat/Rieumes FC (11)	0–4	EF Castelmaurou Verfeil (10)
10.	Fontenilles FC (11)	2–3	EFC Aurignac (9)
11.	AS Toulouse Mirail (9)	2–1	JE Toulousaine Croix-Daurade (8)
12.	ASC Gagnac (13)	1–4	US Etsadens (12)
13.	Toulouse Football Sud (12)	0–3	AS Faourette (11)
14.	Grenade FC (11)	1–3	AS Lavernose-Lherm-Mauzac (8)
15.	ES Franquevielle (12)	2–4	Pyrénées Sud Comminges (10)
16.	US Ramonville (12)	1–7	US Castelginest (8)
17.	(Spain) UE Bossòst (10)	1–0	ES Le Fousseret-Mondavezan (10)
18.	Lauragais FC (11)	1–2	AC Garona (10)
19.	US Labastidette (13)	0–1	AS Flourens Drémil-Lafage (12)
20.	FC Canal Nord (11)	1–1 (5–4 p) (Note: FC Canal Nord penalised for fielding a suspended player, AS Longages qualify.)	AS Longages (10)
21.	Taoupats de Daux (12)	3–1	Football Algérien Toulousain (11)
22.	Toulouse Cheminots Marengo Sports (12)	3–4	Toulouse ACF (10)
23.	FC Bagatelle (11)	1–1 (0–2 p)	JS Carbonne (8)
24.	Entente Montjoire-Magdeleine-Montastruc (11)	0–2	ES Saint-Simon (8)
25.	JS Auzielle Lauzerville (11)	4–1	US Encausse-Soueich-Ganties (10)
26.	FC Bessières-Buzet (13)	0–3	US Pouvourville (8)
27.	AO Cornebarrieu (9)	1–1 (5–3 p)	FC Launaguet (8)
28.	Roques-Confluent Lacroix/Saubens/Pinsaguel (11)	1–2	AS Castelnau-d'Estrétefonds (9)
29.	AS Toulouse Lardenne (11)	0–6	US Bagnères-de-Luchon Sports-Cierp-Gaud-Marignac (10)
30.	SC Valentine (11)	0–2	JS Cintegabelle (8)
31.	FC Labarthe-Rivière (11)	1–2 (Note: Tie reversed from original draw.)	US Toulouse (13)
32.	US Bouloc Saint-Sauveur (10)	5–4	Toulouse Rangueil FC (8)
33.	JS Brax (10)	1–2	ERCSO L'Isle-en-Dodon (8)
34.	RC Muret (12)	4–5	FC Beauzelle (8)
35.	Cap Jeunes 31 (12)	3–0	US Sainte-Foy Football (12)

These matches are from the Gers district, and were played on 25, 26 and 27 August 2023.

First Round Results: Occitanie (Gers)
Tie no	Home team (Tier)	Score	Away team (Tier)
1.	JS Tougetoise (11)	2–4	Sainte-Christie-Preignan AS (9)
2.	AS Manciet (10)	2–2 (5–6 p)	SC Saint-Clar (10)
3.	UA Vic-Fezensac (9)	1–2	FC Pavien (8)
4.	AS Ségoufielle (9)	5–1	Rassemblement Bas Armangnac FC (9)
5.	SC Solomiac (10)	1–3	Forza Labéjan-Saint-Jean-le-Comtal (9)
6.	AS Monferran-Savès (10)	3–0	FC Mirandais (10)
7.	Mauvezin FC (10)	1–1 (2–4 p)	US Simorraine (10)
8.	US Aubiet (9)	1–1 (3–2 p)	Sud Astarac 2010 (9)
9.	Val d'Arros Adour (11)	0–6	AS Fleurance-La Sauvetat (8)
10.	Eauze FC (10)	2–1	Cologne FC (9)

These matches are from the Hérault district, and were played on 25, 26 and 27 August 2023.

First Round Results: Occitanie (Hérault)
Tie no	Home team (Tier)	Score	Away team (Tier)
1.	AS Canet (10)	4–1	FCO Viassois (11)
2.	Avenir Castriote (12)	0–8	Baillargues-Saint-Brès-Valergues (9)
3.	ASPTT Montpellier (11)	3–1 (Note: Tie reversed from original draw.)	USO Florensac-Pinet (10)
4.	RC Montpellier Cévennes (12)	2–5	AS Juvignac (9)
5.	US Villeneuvoise (10)	1–1 (1–4 p)	Jacou Clapiers FA (10)
6.	Olympique Saint-André-de-Sangonis (8)	0–0 (3–1 p)	AS Gignacois (9)
7.	RC Lemasson Montpellier (11)	3–6	US Béziers (8)
8.	FC Thongue et Libron (11)	1–1 (5–3 p)	AC Alignanais (10)
9.	Port Marianne Montpellier FC (12)	3–2	US Basses Cévennes (11)
10.	US Saint-Martinoise (12)	5–1	OF Thézan-Saint-Geniès (12)
11.	FC Lavérune (10)	1–1 (2–4 p)	US Mauguio Carnon (8)
12.	ASPTT Lunel (11)	1–9	CE Palavas (8)
13.	RSO Cournonterral (10)	1–6	Sète OFC (10)
14.	Arceaux Montpellier (10)	5–3	ES Coeur Hérault (10)
15.	AS La Grande-Motte (11)	2–2 (4–5 p) (Note: FC Pradéen penalised for fielding a player under a false identity, AS La Grande-Motte qualify.)	FC Pradéen (11)
16.	ES Cazouls-Maraussan-Maureilham (10)	3–1	Entente Corneilhan-Lignan (10)
17.	FC Sauvian (12)	2–3	FC Domitia (10)
18.	AS Valerguoise (11)	0–5	Stade Balarucois (8)
19.	FC Lamalou-les-Bains (10)	0–2	Arsenal Croix d'Argent (11)
20.	ES Pérols (8)	0–0 (5–4 p)	Mèze Stade FC (8)
21.	Ensérune FC (11)	2–1	Montpeyroux FC (10)
22.	ROC Social Sète (11)	1–1 (3–4 p)	Pointe Courte AC Sète (9)
23.	US Villeveyrac (11)	2–0	FC Lespignan-Vendres (9)
24.	AS Mireval (11)	2–1	Aurore Saint-Gilloise (9)
25.	US Pougetoise (11)	0–3	FO Sud Hérault (8)
26.	FC Sussargues-Berange (10)	3–0	SC Saint-Thibérien (9)

These matches are from the Lot district, and were played on 27 August 2023.

First Round Results: Occitanie (Lot)
Tie no	Home team (Tier)	Score	Away team (Tier)
1.	CL Cuzance (11)	3–3 (3–2 p)	Bouriane FC (9)
2.	Entente Fons Fourmagnac Camburat (11)	2–0	CA Salviacois (11)
3.	Entente Cazals Montcléra (10)	1–1 (3–4 p)	Val Roc Foot (9)
4.	Lacapelle Football (10)	2–1	Entente Bleuets Lendou-Saint-Cyprien-Montcuq (10)
5.	FC Thédirac (11)	0–3	US3C Catus (10)
6.	US Puybrun Tauriac (10)	1–1 (2–4 p)	FC Haut Quercy (9)
7.	Entente Cazillac-Sarrazac (11)	1–4	Puy-l'Évêque-Prayssac FC (9)
8.	FC Gréalou (10)	0–0 (3–2 p)	AS Livernon (10)
9.	Haut Célé FC (10)	1–1 (2–4 p)	FC Begoux Arcambal (11)
10.	Entente Ségala Foot (9)	1–2	AS Causse Limargue (10)
11.	ÉS Saint-Germain (10)	3–0 (Note: Tie won by means of forfeit.)	Entente Cajarc Cenevières (10)

These matches are from the Lozère district, and were played on 27 August 2023.

First Round Results: Occitanie (Lozère)
Tie no	Home team (Tier)	Score	Away team (Tier)
1.	ES Chirac-Le Monastier (12)	2–1	AS Chanac (11)
2.	AS Randonnaise (12)	2–5	ESC Le Buisson (8)
3.	ES Rimeize (12)	0–4	AS Badaroux (11)
4.	AS Le Malzieu (12)	4–1	ASGF Mendois (13)
5.	AS Chastelloise (11)	3–0 (Note: Tie won by means of forfeit.)	Marvejols Sports (10)

These matches are from the Hautes-Pyrénées district, and were played on 25, 26 and 27 August 2023.

First Round Results: Occitanie (Hautes-Pyrénées)
Tie no	Home team (Tier)	Score	Away team (Tier)
1.	US Marquisat Bénac (9)	4–0	Horgues-Odos FC (9)
2.	FC Bazillac (10)	2–0	FC Plateau-Lannezman (9)
3.	FC Pyrénées/Vallées des Gaves (8)	0–1	Juillan OS (8)
4.	Elan Pyrénéen Bazet-Bordères-Lagarde (9)	1–2	Séméac OFC (9)
5.	US Tarbais Nouvelle Vague (9)	1–3	Boutons d'Or Ger (8)
6.	ACBM Hippocampe Tarbes (11)	1–3	FC Ibos-Ossun (9)
7.	FC Bordes (11)	0–8	ES Haut Adour (9)
8.	FC des Nestes (9)	1–0	FC Val d'Adour (8)
9.	ASC Aureilhan (10)	0–2	ASC Barbazan-Debat (9)
10.	Tarbes FC (10)	1–3	US Côteaux (10)

These matches are from the Pyrénées-Orientales district, and were played on 27 August and 3 September 2023.

First Round Results: Occitanie (Pyrénées-Orientales)
Tie no	Home team (Tier)	Score	Away team (Tier)
1.	FC Cerdagne-Font Romeu-Capcir (10)	2–0	Céret FC (9)
2.	FC Ille-sur-Têt/Néfiach	0–15	Sporting Perpignan Nord (8)
3.	FC Saint-Cyprien (9)	0–1	FC Claira/Saint-Laurent (9)
4.	FC Thuirinois (10)	1–1 (1–3 p)	FC Le Soler (9)
5.	Le Boulou Saint-Jean FC (9)	1–2	Racing Perpignan Méditerranée (9)
6.	ASPTT Pays Catalan (12)	1–0	FC Barcarès Méditerranée (11)
7.	FC Port-Vendres (11)	0–3 (Note: Tie won by means of forfeit.)	AF Catalan (8)
8.	BECE FC Vallée de l'Aigly (10)	5–2	Baho-Pézilla FC (10)
9.	FC Pia (12)	0–3	AS Prades (9)

These matches are from the Tarn district, and were played on 26 and 27 August 2023.

First Round Results: Occitanie (Tarn)
Tie no	Home team (Tier)	Score	Away team (Tier)
1.	Cambounet FC (9)	2–0	US Albi (8)
2.	US Aiguefonde (12)	1–1 (8–7 p)	ACS Labrespy (10)
3.	FC Labastide-de-Lévis (11)	1–3	US Castres (8)
4.	Valence Valderiès FC (10)	0–3	Les Copains d'Abord (10)
5.	La Mygale Le Séquestre Football (9)	1–0	US Gaillacois (8)
6.	US Carmaux (11)	1–1 (5–4 p)	FC Graulhet (8)
7.	Réalmont FC (9)	1–1 (4–3 p)	AS Vallée du Sor (10)
8.	FC Pigné (12)	0–12	AS Briatexte (10)
9.	Sport Benfica Graulhet (9)	1–5	AS Pampelonnaise (9)
10.	US Cordes Valver (11)	1–3	AF Pays d'Oc 81 (11)
11.	Sporting Castres (12)	5–0	FC Vignoble 81 (8)
12.	FC Lacaune (11)	0–3	US Labruguièroise (10)
13.	AS Payrin-Rigautou (10)	2–1	AS Lagrave (9)
14.	Terssac Albi FC (10)	2–2 (5–4 p)	Roquecourbe FC (10)

These matches are from the Tarn-et-Garonne district, and were played on 25, 26 and 27 August 2023.

First Round Results: Occitanie (Tarn-et-Garonne)
Tie no	Home team (Tier)	Score	Away team (Tier)
1.	AS Stéphanoise (10)	2–0	Coquelicots Montéchois FC (10)
2.	FC Montpezat Puylaroque (10)	2–2 (4–3 p)	AS Bressols (8)
3.	Stade Caussadais (10)	4–3	JS Meauzacaise (9)
4.	Avenir Magistérien Football (11)	0–1	FC Nègrepelisse-Montricoux (8)
5.	FC Quercy Rouergue (11)	0–5	Corbarieu AC (11)
6.	FCUS Molières (9)	0–3	Confluences FC (9)
7.	FC Les 2 Ponts (10)	0–1	FC Brulhois (9)
8.	Loubejac-Ardus FC (10)	1–3	SC Lafrançaise (9)
9.	US Malause (9)	3–2	Cazes Olympique (8)
10.	JE Montalbanais (9)	2–2 (2–4 p)	La Nicolaite (8)

=== Second round ===
These matches are from the Ariège district, and were played on 2 and 3 September 2023.

Second Round Results: Occitanie (Ariège)
Tie no	Home team (Tier)	Score	Away team (Tier)
1.	ES Saint-Jean-du-Falga (9)	1–3	ES Fossatoise (8)
2.	FC Mirepoix 09 (8)	3–1	FC Saint-Girons (8)
3.	FC Saverdun (8)	1–2	FC Pamiers (8)
4.	US Lescure (9)	1–7	AS Rieux-de-Pelleport (9)
5.	FC Coussa-Hers (9)	1–9	Luzenac AP (6)

These matches are from the Aude district, and were played on 3 September 2023.

Second Round Results: Occitanie (Aude)
Tie no	Home team (Tier)	Score	Away team (Tier)
1.	USA Pezens (9)	1–3	Olympic Cuxac-d'Aude (9)
2.	Leucate FC (12)	1–2	FC Briolet (8)
3.	FC Cougaing (11)	0–9	FA Carcassonne (6)
4.	AS Bram (10)	1–5 (Note: UF Lézignanais penalised for fielding a suspended player, AS Bram qualify.)	UF Lézignanais (9)
5.	ES Sainte-Eulalie-Villesèquelande (10)	2–2 (3–5 p)	MJC Gruissan (8)
6.	Razès Olympique (10)	2–2 (4–5 p)	AS Espéraza (10)
7.	Entente Naurouze-Labastide (8)	1–3	FU Narbonne (6)
8.	Olympique Corbières Sud Minervois (9)	3–1	Trapel-Pennautier FC (10)
9.	RC Pieusse (11)	2–2 (3–1 p)	FC Corbières Méditerranée (8)
10.	Trèbes FC (7)	4–0	CO Castelnaudary (7)
11.	Haut-Minervois Olympique (8)	0–0 (4–3 p)	US Conques (7)

These matches are from the Aveyron district, and were played on 1, 2 and 3 September 2023.

Second Round Results: Occitanie (Aveyron)
Tie no	Home team (Tier)	Score	Away team (Tier)
1.	JS Lévézou (9)	2–4	US Réquistanaise (8)
2.	US Argence/Viadène (10)	0–6	Druelle FC (7)
3.	FC Naucellois (9)	1–2	JS Rance Rougier (10)
4.	Entente Costecalde Lestrade Broquiès (10)	1–5	SO Millau (8)
5.	AS Aguessac (9)	5–1	US Bas Rouergue (9)
6.	Luc Primaube FC (7)	10–0 (Note: Tie reversed from original draw.)	AO Bozouls (10)
7.	Espoir FC 88 (8)	2–1	Ouest Aveyron Football (9)
8.	FC Sources de l'Aveyron (7)	0–3	FC Comtal (7)
9.	Association Saint-Laurentaise Cantonale Canourguaise (10)	3–1	US Pays Alzuréen (11)
10.	Stade Saint-Affricain (8)	4–0	AS Saint-Geniez-d'Olt (9)
11.	FC Monastère (8)	1–1 (1–3 p)	US Montbazens Rignac (8)

These matches are from the Gard district, and were played on 2 and 3 September 2023.

Second Round Results: Occitanie (Gard)
Tie no	Home team (Tier)	Score	Away team (Tier)
1.	FC Moussac (10)	0–0 (4–3 p)	All Five Académie (11)
2.	JS Chemin Bas d'Avignon (7)	2–5	AS Rousson (7)
3.	AS Caissargues (10)	0–3	Entente Perrier Vergèze (8)
4.	Pays Viganais Aigoual FC (10)	0–1	RC Générac (9)
5.	AS Saint-Privat-des-Vieux (10)	2–2 (3–2 p)	ES Barjac (9)
6.	FC Chusclan-Laudun-l'Ardoise (8)	1–1 (3–4 p)	SC Anduzien (8)
7.	AS Beauvoisin (10)	0–2	GC Uchaud (7)
8.	AS Poulx (10)	0–4	FC Bagnols Pont (6)
9.	ES Grau-du-Roi (6)	0–0 (0–3 p)	US Salinières Aigues Mortes (6)
10.	SC Nîmois (11)	3–7	ES Marguerittes (8)
11.	Sedisud FC (11)	2–2 (2–4 p)	FC Val de Cèze (9)
12.	Stade Sainte-Barbe (9)	0–3	SO Aimargues (6)
13.	EF Vézénobres Cruviers (10)	1–3	CA Bessegeoise (9)
14.	US Monoblet (8)	1–5	ES Pays d'Uzes (6)
15.	SC Manduellois (10)	2–2 (3–2 p)	SC Saint-Martin-de-Valgalgues (10)
16.	ES Suménoise (9)	7–2	AS Saint-Christol-lès-Alès (10)
17.	Olympique Fourquésien (10)	2–6	FC Vauverdois (7)

These matches are from the Haute-Garonne district, and were played on 2 and 3 September 2023.

Second Round Results: Occitanie (Haute-Garonne)
Tie no	Home team (Tier)	Score	Away team (Tier)
1.	AS Faourette (11)	1–3	AO Cornebarrieu (9)
2.	Comminges Saint-Gaudens (7)	2–2 (3–4 p)	Toulouse Rodéo FC (6)
3.	AS Longages (10)	1–3	Entente Boulogne-Péguilhan (7)
4.	AS Flourens Drémil-Lafage (12)	0–5	Union Saint-Jean FC (6)
5.	JS Cugnaux (7)	4–1	AS Portet-Carrefour-Récébédou (7)
6.	US Cazères (7)	1–2	Balma SC (6)
7.	US Bagnères-de-Luchon Sports-Cierp-Gaud-Marignac (10)	0–6	Saint-Alban Aucamville FC (6)
8.	Olympique Girou FC (7)	0–1	US Pibrac (6)
9.	Entente Landorthe-Labarthe-Estancarbon-Savarthès (9)	0–4	JS Carbonne (8)
10.	Toulouse Olympique Aviation Club (9)	5–1	FC Beauzelle (8)
11.	(Spain) UE Bossòst (10)	1–4	Juventus de Papus (7)
12.	Taoupats de Daux (12)	0–3 (Note: Tie won by means of forfeit.)	UA Fenouillet (8)
13.	EF Castelmaurou Verfeil (10)	1–3	US Léguevin (7)
14.	US Etsadens (12)	0–5	US Plaisance (7)
15.	Toulouse ACF (10)	2–4	Pyrénées Sud Comminges (10)
16.	FC MAS 31 (8)	2–1	JS Cintegabelle (8)
17.	Avenir Fonsorbais (8)	0–1	AS Tournefeuille (7)
18.	EFC Aurignac (9)	1–5	ERCSO L'Isle-en-Dodon (8)
19.	US Pouvourville (8)	0–0 (4–5 p)	AS Lavernose-Lherm-Mauzac (8)
20.	Toulouse Football Compans Caffarelli (10)	3–4	US Revel (6)
21.	AC Garona (10)	1–1 (3–4 p)	JS Auzielle Lauzerville (11)
22.	Cap Jeunes 31 (12)	1–4	US Salies-du-Salat/Mane/Saint-Martory (6)
23.	AS Castelnau-d'Estrétefonds (9)	0–6	US Seysses-Frouzins (6)
24.	US Castelginest (8)	1–2 (Note: Baziège OC penalised for fielding a suspended player, US Castelginest qualify.)	Baziège OC (6)
25.	ES Saint-Simon (8)	5–2 (Note: Tie reversed from original draw.)	US Toulouse (13)
26.	AS Hersoise (11)	0–8	Toulouse Métropole FC (6)
27.	Labège FC (9)	2–6	AS Toulouse Mirail (9)
28.	US Bouloc Saint-Sauveur (10)	0–8	AS Muret (6)

These matches are from the Gers district, and were played on 1, 2 and 3 September 2023.

Second Round Results: Occitanie (Gers)
Tie no	Home team (Tier)	Score	Away team (Tier)
1.	ES Gimontoise (9)	0–2	Auch Football (6)
2.	US Aubiet (9)	3–0	Eauze FC (10)
3.	US Simorraine (10)	1–10	AS Ségoufielle (9)
4.	Forza Labéjan-Saint-Jean-le-Comtal (9)	0–5	AS Fleurance-La Sauvetat (8)
5.	US Aignanais (9)	2–4	FC L'Islois (8)
6.	SC Saint-Clar (10)	1–4	Sainte-Christie-Preignan AS (9)
7.	AS Monferran-Savès (10)	1–2	FC Pavien (8)

These matches are from the Hérault district, and were played on 1, 2, 3 and 13 September 2023.

Second Round Results: Occitanie (Hérault)
Tie no	Home team (Tier)	Score	Away team (Tier)
1.	CE Palavas (8)	2–5	AS Pignan (7)
2.	US Villeveyrac (11)	0–5	AS Lattoise (7)
3.	AS Juvignac (9)	1–6	PI Vendargues (6)
4.	Pointe Courte AC Sète (9)	2–0	Olympique Saint-André-de-Sangonis (8)
5.	ASPTT Montpellier (11)	0–5	AS Fabrègues (6)
6.	FC Domitia (10)	2–1 (Note: FC Domitia penalised for fielding a suspended player, RC Vedasien qualify.)	RC Vedasien (8)
7.	Ensérune FC (11)	1–5	AS Méditerrannée 34 (7)
8.	Castelnau Le Crès FC (7)	2–1 (Note: Tie reversed from original draw.)	AS La Grande-Motte (11)
9.	US Saint-Martinoise (12)	1–3	FC Sussargues-Berange (10)
10.	Stade Balarucois (8)	0–0 (3–4 p)	ES Paulhan-Pézenas (8)
11.	Baillargues-Saint-Brès-Valergues (9)	4–1	Arceaux Montpellier (10)
12.	AS Mireval (11)	0–5	GC Lunel (6)
13.	US Mauguio Carnon (8)	1–2	FC Petit Bard (7)
14.	Olympique La Peyrade FC (9)	0–2	AS Canet (10)
15.	AS Frontignan AC (6)	0–1	AS Atlas Paillade (6)
16.	Port Marianne Montpellier FC (12)	0–7	La Clermontaise Football (6)
17.	FO Sud Hérault (8)	1–1 (6–5 p)	US Béziers (8)
18.	Jacou Clapiers FA (10)	2–1	Olympique Saint-André-de-Sangonis (8)
19.	Sète OFC (10)	5–1	AS Puissalicon-Magalas (9)
20.	FC Thongue et Libron (11)	0–11	SC Sète (8)
21.	Arsenal Croix d'Argent (11)	1–2	ES Pérols (8)

These matches are from the Lot district, and were played on 3 September 2023.

Second Round Results: Occitanie (Lot)
Tie no	Home team (Tier)	Score	Away team (Tier)
1.	FC Begoux Arcambal (11)	3–3 (3–4 p)	Lacapelle Football (10)
2.	Élan Marivalois (8)	1–2	Cahors FC (7)
3.	FC Haut Quercy (9)	3–2	Entente Souillac-La Chapelle-Gignac (9)
4.	FC Gréalou (10)	0–2	FC Lalbenque-Fontanes (9)
5.	Puy-l'Évêque-Prayssac FC (9)	1–4	Figeac Capdenac Quercy FC (7)
6.	US3C Catus (10)	1–0	ÉS Saint-Germain (10)
7.	AS Causse Limargue (10)	6–1	Pradines-Saint-Vincent-Douelle-Mercuès Olt (9)
8.	Val Roc Foot (9)	0–12	FC Biars-Bretenoux (6)
9.	CL Cuzance (11)	2–0	Entente Fons Fourmagnac Camburat (11)

These matches are from the Lozère district, and were played on 3 September 2023.

Second Round Results: Occitanie (Lozère)
Tie no	Home team (Tier)	Score	Away team (Tier)
1.	ES Chirac-Le Monastier (12)	1–4	ESC Le Buisson (8)
2.	AS Badaroux (11)	1–1 (5–4 p)	AS Chastelloise (11)
3 .	AS Le Malzieu (12)	0–10	AF Lozère (6)

These matches are from the Hautes-Pyrénées district, and were played on 1, 2 and 3 September 2023.

Second Round Results: Occitanie (Hautes-Pyrénées)
Tie no	Home team (Tier)	Score	Away team (Tier)
1.	ASC Barbazan-Debat (9)	1–2	Séméac OFC (9)
2.	Juillan OS (8)	3–2	FC des Nestes (9)
3.	ES Haut Adour (9)	0–4	FC Lourdais XI (7)
4.	FC Ibos-Ossun (9)	2–2 (4–3 p)	Soues Cigognes FC (8)
5.	FC Bazillac (10)	1–5	Tarbes Pyrénées Football (6)
6.	Boutons d'Or Ger (8)	2–1	Quand Même Orleix (8)
7.	US Côteaux (10)	1–2	US Marquisat Bénac (9)

These matches are from the Pyrénées-Orientales district, and were played on 3 and 6 September 2023.

Second Round Results: Occitanie (Pyrénées-Orientales)
Tie no	Home team (Tier)	Score	Away team (Tier)
1.	FC Le Soler (9)	2–0	FC Cerdagne-Font Romeu-Capcir (10)
2.	AS Prades (9)	1–2	FC Villelongue (9)
3.	BECE FC Vallée de l'Aigly (10)	0–3	Sporting Perpignan Nord (8)
4.	ASPTT Pays Catalan (12)	0–6	FC Claira/Saint-Laurent (9)
5.	Racing Perpignan Méditerranée (9)	0–2	AF Catalan (8)
6.	SO Rivesaltais (8)	3–2	OC Perpignan (7)

These matches are from the Tarn district, and were played on 1, 2 and 3 September 2023.

Second Round Results: Occitanie (Tarn)
Tie no	Home team (Tier)	Score	Away team (Tier)
1.	Sporting Castres (12)	0–2	Terssac Albi FC (10)
2.	US Aiguefonde (12)	0–6	US Saint-Sulpice (7)
3.	US Castres (8)	1–1 (3–1 p)	Saint-Juéry OF (7)
4.	US Labruguièroise (10)	0–1	AS Pampelonnaise (9)
5.	Les Copains d'Abord (10)	0–5	La Cremade FC (9)
6.	AS Briatexte (10)	3–3 (7–8 p)	AS Giroussens (9)
7.	La Mygale Le Séquestre Football (9)	1–17	Lavaur FC (6)
8.	AS Payrin-Rigautou (10)	3–1	US Autan (10)
9.	AF Pays d'Oc 81 (11)	1–5	FC Pays Mazamétain (7)
10.	Réalmont FC (9)	0–2	Albi Marssac Tarn Football ASPTT (7)
11.	US Carmaux (11)	1–2	Cambounet FC (9)

These matches are from the Tarn-et-Garonne district, and were played on 1, 2 and 3 September 2023.

Second Round Results: Occitanie (Tarn-et-Garonne)
Tie no	Home team (Tier)	Score	Away team (Tier)
1.	Confluences FC (9)	5–1	FC Montpezat Puylaroque (10)
2.	FC Nègrepelisse-Montricoux (8)	0–0 (5–4 p)	US Malause (9)
3.	AS Stéphanoise (10)	0–8	AA Grisolles (7)
4.	La Nicolaite (8)	5–0	FC Brulhois (9)
5.	Corbarieu AC (11)	0–5	FC 2 Rives 82 (6)
6.	Stade Caussadais (10)	0–0 (2–5 p)	FC Garonne Gascogne (7)
7.	SC Lafrançaise (9)	0–5	Montauban FCTG (6)

=== Third round ===
These matches were played on 16 and 17 September 2023, with one replayed on 23 September 2023.

Third Round Results: Occitanie
Tie no	Home team (Tier)	Score	Away team (Tier)
1.	AF Lozère (6)	1–1 (2–4 p)	ES Pays d'Uzes (6)
2.	ESC Le Buisson (8)	3–1	CA Bessegeoise (9)
3.	SC Anduzien (8)	1–1 (5–3 p)	Entente Saint-Clément-Montferrier (5)
4.	RC Générac (9)	1–2	ES Suménoise (9)
5.	FC Val de Cèze (9)	1–3	GC Uchaud (7)
6.	FC Moussac (10)	2–0	ES Pérols (8)
7.	Entente Perrier Vergèze (8)	1–1 (2–4 p)	AS Rousson (7)
8.	AS Saint-Privat-des-Vieux (10)	3–7	FC Bagnols Pont (6)
9.	FC Vauverdois (7)	1–0	SO Aimargues (6)
10.	ES Marguerittes (8)	1–0	US Salinières Aigues Mortes (6)
11.	AS Badaroux (11)	0–4	Stade Beaucairois (5)
12.	FC Sussargues-Berange (10)	3–3 (4–3 p)	SC Sète (8)
13.	GC Lunel (6)	1–1 (4–3 p)	Union Saint-Estève Espoir Perpignan Méditerannée Métropole (5)
14.	Baillargues-Saint-Brès-Valergues (9)	1–4	AS Pignan (7)
15.	SO Millau (8)	0–3	AS Fabrègues (6)
16.	RC Vedasien (8)	2–1	FC Petit Bard (7)
17.	Castelnau Le Crès FC (7)	3–3 (1–4 p)	RCO Agde (5)
18.	Jacou Clapiers FA (10)	4–1	MJC Gruissan (8)
19.	Olympic Cuxac-d'Aude (9)	1–1 (5–4 p)	ES Paulhan-Pézenas (8)
20.	Olympique Corbières Sud Minervois (9)	4–0	Pointe Courte AC Sète (9)
21.	FO Sud Hérault (8)	0–0 (1–3 p)	PI Vendargues (6)
22.	SC Manduellois (10)	1–2	AS Atlas Paillade (6)
23.	AS Lattoise (7)	2–1	Haut-Minervois Olympique (8)
24.	FC Le Soler (9)	0–1	Canet Roussillon FC (5)
25.	AS Bram (10)	0–2	AF Catalan (8)
26.	RC Pieusse (11)	0–4	FC Alberes Argelès (5)
27.	FC Villelongue (9)	0–1	FU Narbonne (6)
28.	Trèbes FC (7)	1–1 (3–4 p)	AS Béziers (6)
29.	AS Espéraza (10)	0–3	AS Canet (10)
30.	AS Méditerrannée 34 (7)	1–2	SO Rivesaltais (8)
31.	Sète OFC (10)	1–2	La Clermontaise Football (6)
32.	Sporting Perpignan Nord (8)	0–3	FA Carcassonne (6)
33.	FC Briolet (8)	2–2 (7–6 p)	FC Claira/Saint-Laurent (9)
34.	Juventus de Papus (7)	0–0 (5–4 p)	JS Cugnaux (7)
35.	AS Muret (6)	1–0	Luzenac AP (6)
36.	ES Fossatoise (8)	5–1	FC Mirepoix 09 (8)
37.	JS Carbonne (8)	1–4	Toulouse Métropole FC (6)
38.	FC Pays Mazamétain (7)	2–4	US Castanéenne (5)
39.	AS Toulouse Mirail (9)	2–4	AS Tournefeuille (7)
40.	AS Lavernose-Lherm-Mauzac (8)	2–0	AS Giroussens (9)
41.	JS Auzielle Lauzerville (11)	0–2	US Revel (6)
42.	AS Payrin-Rigautou (10)	0–1	Toulouse Olympique Aviation Club (9)
43.	AS Rieux-de-Pelleport (9)	1–1 (2–4 p) (Note: The original game ended 1–3, but was instructed to be replayed after a refereeing error allowed a substituted US Castres player to re-enter the field.)	US Castres (8)
44.	US Plaisance (7)	0–4	FC Pamiers (8)
45.	FC Garonne Gascogne (7)	3–0 (Note: Tie reversed from original draw.)	FC Nègrepelisse-Montricoux (8)
46.	UA Fenouillet (8)	0–2	FC MAS 31 (8)
47.	Lacapelle Football (10)	0–8	Montauban FCTG (6)
48.	Cahors FC (7)	0–4	FC Biars-Bretenoux (6)
49.	FC 2 Rives 82 (6)	2–0	Saint-Alban Aucamville FC (6)
50.	Figeac Capdenac Quercy FC (7)	3–3 (8–7 p)	AA Grisolles (7)
51.	AS Causse Limargue (10)	1–1 (1–2 p)	La Nicolaite (8)
52.	AS Fleurance-La Sauvetat (8)	1–3	Blagnac FC (5)
53.	FC Lalbenque-Fontanes (9)	1–1 (4–1 p)	ES Saint-Simon (8)
54.	FC Haut Quercy (9)	0–1	Confluences FC (9)
55.	US3C Catus (10)	4–0	CL Cuzance (11)
56.	Toulouse Rodéo FC (6)	0–0 (5–4 p)	Union Saint-Jean FC (6)
57.	US Saint-Sulpice (7)	2–2 (4–3 p)	Espoir FC 88 (8)
58.	FC Comtal (7)	6–2	Luc Primaube FC (7)
59.	US Montbazens Rignac (8)	1–0	Albi Marssac Tarn Football ASPTT (7)
60.	US Castelginest (8)	0–3	Balma SC (6)
61.	Terssac Albi FC (10)	0–4	AS Aguessac (9)
62.	US Réquistanaise (8)	1–1 (4–5 p)	La Cremade FC (9)
63.	Druelle FC (7)	0–5	Onet-le-Château Football (5)
64.	AS Pampelonnaise (9)	1–5	Stade Saint-Affricain (8)
65.	JS Rance Rougier (10)	0–2	Association Saint-Laurentaise Cantonale Canourguaise (10)
66.	Cambounet FC (9)	1–0	Lavaur FC (6)
67.	US Aubiet (9)	0–4	US Colomiers Football (5)
68.	Sainte-Christie-Preignan AS (9)	1–2	ERCSO L'Isle-en-Dodon (8)
69.	Juillan OS (8)	2–4	Tarbes Pyrénées Football (6)
70.	Boutons d'Or Ger (8)	0–3	US Seysses-Frouzins (6)
71.	AO Cornebarrieu (9)	2–4	AS Ségoufielle (9)
72.	FC Pavien (8)	1–1 (4–3 p)	US Léguevin (7)
73.	US Salies-du-Salat/Mane/Saint-Martory (6)	2–2 (6–5 p)	FC Lourdais XI (7)
74.	US Pibrac (6)	0–4	Auch Football (6)
75.	Séméac OFC (9)	2–2 (8–7 p)	Entente Boulogne-Péguilhan (7)
76.	Pyrénées Sud Comminges (10)	3–0	FC Ibos-Ossun (9)
77.	FC L'Islois (8)	2–0	US Marquisat Bénac (9)

=== Fourth round ===
These matches were played on 30 September and 1 October 2023.

Fourth Round Results: Occitanie
Tie no	Home team (Tier)	Score	Away team (Tier)
1.	Olympique Corbières Sud Minervois (9)	1–1 (3–5 p)	AS Pignan (7)
2.	FC Bagnols Pont (6)	4–2	GC Lunel (6)
3.	FC Briolet (8)	0–2	RCO Agde (5)
4.	Olympic Cuxac-d'Aude (9)	0–5	GC Uchaud (7)
5.	SO Rivesaltais (8)	1–1 (4–3 p)	La Clermontaise Football (6)
6.	SC Anduzien (8)	0–5	AS Atlas Paillade (6)
7.	ES Suménoise (9)	0–4	Olympique Alès (4)
8.	FC Vauverdois (7)	0–0 (5–3 p)	ESC Le Buisson (8)
9.	Jacou Clapiers FA (10)	1–1 (6–5 p)	RC Vedasien (8)
10.	FC Sussargues-Berange (10)	1–3	AS Rousson (7)
11.	AS Fabrègues (6)	3–2	ES Pays d'Uzes (6)
12.	Stade Beaucairois (5)	5–2	PI Vendargues (6)
13.	FC Moussac (10)	0–2	ES Marguerittes (8)
14.	Toulouse Olympique Aviation Club (9)	0–3	FU Narbonne (6)
15.	US Castres (8)	0–4	Toulouse Métropole FC (6)
16.	AS Lattoise (7)	0–1	US Saint-Sulpice (7)
17.	AS Béziers (6)	5–0	Juventus de Papus (7)
18.	Balma SC (6)	0–2	FC Alberes Argelès (5)
19.	ES Fossatoise (8)	0–2	Canet Roussillon FC (5)
20.	AS Tournefeuille (7)	1–0	AF Catalan (8)
21.	Stade Saint-Affricain (8)	0–1	US Revel (6)
22.	AS Aguessac (9)	1–2	Toulouse Rodéo FC (6)
23.	FC Pamiers (8)	0–0 (4–5 p)	FA Carcassonne (6)
24.	FC MAS 31 (8)	1–1 (2–3 p)	AS Lavernose-Lherm-Mauzac (8)
25.	AS Canet (10)	1–4	US Castanéenne (5)
26.	Association Saint-Laurentaise Cantonale Canourguaise (10)	4–1	Cambounet FC (9)
27.	La Cremade FC (9)	4–1	AS Ségoufielle (9)
28.	US3C Catus (10)	0–4	US Montbazens Rignac (8)
29.	Figeac Capdenac Quercy FC (7)	3–0	US Colomiers Football (5)
30.	Onet-le-Château Football (5)	1–2	AS Muret (6)
31.	Blagnac FC (5)	2–0	FC 2 Rives 82 (6)
32.	Confluences FC (9)	1–4	US Seysses-Frouzins (6)
33.	Tarbes Pyrénées Football (6)	6–0	US Salies-du-Salat/Mane/Saint-Martory (6)
34.	FC Comtal (7)	4–1	FC Garonne Gascogne (7)
35.	Pyrénées Sud Comminges (10)	1–4	FC Pavien (8)
36.	FC Lalbenque-Fontanes (9)	0–1	Séméac OFC (9)
37.	Auch Football (6)	0–0 (4–2 p)	FC Biars-Bretenoux (6)
38.	La Nicolaite (8)	1–4	FC L'Islois (8)
39.	ERCSO L'Isle-en-Dodon (8)	0–3	Montauban FCTG (6)

=== Fifth round ===
These matches were played on 14 and 15 October 2023.

Fifth Round Results: Occitanie
Tie no	Home team (Tier)	Score	Away team (Tier)
1.	AS Atlas Paillade (6)	7–1	AS Tournefeuille (7)
2.	AS Pignan (7)	1–3	RCO Agde (5)
3.	FA Carcassonne (6)	1–2	AS Fabrègues (6)
4.	AS Lavernose-Lherm-Mauzac (8)	2–1 (Note: Match stopped in the 89th minute after an altercation between players and supporters. US Saint-Sulpice refused to restart the game. The league opened an investigation. Initially, both teams were penalised and removed from the competition. However, AS Lavernose-Lherm-Mauzac were later reinstated after a successful appeal.)	US Saint-Sulpice (7)
5.	FC Pavien (8)	0–7	Nîmes Olympique (3)
6.	ES Marguerittes (8)	0–2	Toulouse Métropole FC (6)
7.	La Cremade FC (9)	0–1	FC Vauverdois (7)
8.	Association Saint-Laurentaise Cantonale Canourguaise (10)	1–3	Blagnac FC (6)
9.	US Montbazens Rignac (8)	1–1 (3–5 p)	Figeac Capdenac Quercy FC (7)
10.	GC Uchaud (7)	2–0	Séméac OFC (9)
11.	FC L'Islois (8)	0–2	US Castanéenne (5)
12.	US Seysses-Frouzins (6)	0–0 (5–3 p)	Tarbes Pyrénées Football (6)
13.	FC Comtal (7)	0–3	FC Alberes Argelès (5)
14.	Jacou Clapiers FA (10)	3–3 (4–5 p)	Stade Beaucairois (5)
15.	AS Rousson (7)	1–2	Olympique Alès (4)
16.	SO Rivesaltais (8)	0–2	US Revel (6)
17.	AS Béziers (6)	1–2	Auch Football (6)
18.	FU Narbonne (6)	1–0	FC Bagnols Pont (6)
19.	AS Muret (6)	1–1 (4–3 p)	Toulouse Rodéo FC (6)
20.	Montauban FCTG (6)	0–3	Canet Roussillon FC (5)

=== Sixth round ===
These matches were played on 28 and 29 October 2023. One was rearranged for 5 November 2023 after a decision from the previous round was overruled.

Sixth Round Results: Occitanie
Tie no	Home team (Tier)	Score	Away team (Tier)
1.	Canet Roussillon FC (5)	3–1	US Seysses-Frouzins (6)
2.	FC Vauverdois (7)	1–4	Nîmes Olympique (3)
3.	Figeac Capdenac Quercy FC (7)	0–0 (5–6 p)	Blagnac FC (5)
4.	AS Fabrègues (6)	1–1 (7–6 p)	AS Muret (6)
5.	US Revel (6)	1–0	AS Atlas Paillade (6)
6.	Toulouse Métropole FC (6)	1–1 (5–4 p)	FU Narbonne (6)
7.	RCO Agde (5)	2–2 (0–3 p)	US Castanéenne (5)
8.	Olympique Alès (4)	2–1	Stade Beaucairois (5)
9.	FC Alberes Argelès (5)	0–0 (5–6 p)	Auch Football (6)
10.	AS Lavernose-Lherm-Mauzac (8)	0–0 (3–2 p)	GC Uchaud (7)
