= Grégory Carmona =

French footballer (born 1979)

Personal information
- Date of birth: 17 January 1979 (age 47)
- Place of birth: Montpellier, France
- Height: 1.70 m (5 ft 7 in)
- Position: Midfielder

Youth career
- Castelnau Le Crès
- 1993–1999: Montpellier

Senior career*
| Years | Team | Apps | (Gls) |
| 1999–2001 | Montpellier | 10 | (0) |
| 2001–2004 | ASOA Valence | 89 | (18) |
| 2004–2005 | Gueugnon | 32 | (3) |
| 2005–2006 | Sète | 27 | (2) |
| 2006–2007 | Tours | 29 | (1) |
| 2007–2008 | Boulogne | 23 | (1) |
| 2009–2010 | Béziers | | |
- * Club domestic league appearances and goals

Grégory Carmona (born 17 January 1979) is a French former professional footballer who played as a midfielder.

== Career ==
Carmona is the son of a former Montpellier player, Norbert Carmona, who made two appearances for the club in the 1977–78 season. A quick attacking midfielder, Carmona joined the Montpellier youth academy in 1993 from Castelnau Le Crès, where he had played alongside future professional players such as Sébastien Gimenez, Romain Rambier and Grégory Vignal. In 1997 he was part of the team reaching the final in the Coupe Gambardella which was eventually lost to Lyon. He made his professional debut for the first team on 25 March 2000 against Auxerre, in which he came on as a 88th-minute substitute for Rui Pataca in a 2–0 win. He played three league games during the season which saw the club suffer relegation to Ligue 2. He signed his first professional contract after the season, but after only making seven league appearances in the following season, he was released by the club.

Carmona joined ASOA Valence in 2001, competing in Championnat National. He contributed greatly to the club's third place in the league which secured promotion to Ligue 2, making 37 appearances and finishing as the club's top goalscorer with ten goals.

After failing to gain a contract following a trial with Lorient, and later Racing Besançon, he finally signed a one-year contract with Gueugnon. He played for several clubs the following years including Sète, Tours and Boulogne.

After being released in 2008, he kept in contact with Sète for a return. However, the move did not come to fruition due to the club's dire financial situation. In January 2009, Carmona joined Béziers in Régional 1. He had some late success with the club, scoring a decisive goal against Tarbes Pyrénées in 2010 which ensured promotion to the national divisions. Carmona retired from football at the end of the 2009–10 season, which had ended in a second consecutive promotion, this time to the fourth-tier Championnat de France Amateur.

== Honours ==
Béziers

- Régional 1 – Languedoc-Roussillon: 2008–09
- Championnat de France Amateur 2 – Group F: 2009–10
