= Giménez =

People called Giménez or Gimenez include:

- Andrés Giménez (born 1998), Venezuelan baseball player
- Ángel Giménez (born 1955), Spanish tennis player
- Carlos Giménez (disambiguation), several people
- Ceferino Giménez Malla (1861–1936), Spanish catechist
- Chris Gimenez (born 1982), American baseball player
- Christian Giménez (footballer, born 1974), Argentine football player
- Christian Giménez (footballer, born 1981), Argentine football player
- Damián Giménez (born 1982), Argentine football player
- Edison Giménez (born 1981), Paraguayan football player
- Ernesto Giménez Caballero (1899–1988), Spanish writer and diplomat
- Estela Giménez (born 1979), Spanish gymnast
- Fernando Giménez (born 1984), Paraguayan football midfielder
- Gerónimo Giménez (1854–1923), Spanish conductor and composer
- Guilherme Gimenez de Souza (1995–2016), Brazilian footballer
- Héctor Giménez (baseball) (born 1982), Venezuelan baseball player
- Herminio Giménez (1905–1991), Paraguayan composer
- José María Giménez de Vargas (born 1995), Uruguayan football player
- José María Giménez Pérez (born 1980), Spanish football player
- Juan Giménez (1943–2020), Argentine comic book artist
- Juan Carlos Giménez Ferreyra (born 1960), Paraguayan boxer
- Luciana Gimenez (born 1970), Brazil fashion model and TV hostess
- María Celeste Giménez Navarro (born 1987), Argentine politician
- Mark Gimenez, American author and lawyer
- Matías Giménez (born 1983), Argentine football winger
- Pablo Giménez (born 1981), Paraguayan football player
- Remberto Giménez (1898–1977), Paraguayan musician
- Santiago Giménez (born 2001), Mexican footballer
- Sara Giménez (born 1996), Paraguayan tennis player
- Sara Giménez Giménez (born 1977), Spanish Roma lawyer
- Sébastien Gimenez (born 1974), French football player
- Susana Giménez (born 1944), Argentine actress and diva
- Teresa Canela Giménez (born 1959), Spanish chess player
- Álvaro Giménez (born 1991), Spanish footballer

== See also ==
- Gimenez stain
- Jiménez (disambiguation)
