= Francisco Jiménez =

Francisco Jiménez may refer to:

- Francisco Jiménez (equestrian) (1893-1973), Spanish Olympic equestrian
- Francisco Jiménez (governor), colonial Nahua noble from Tecamachalco
- Francisco Jiménez (writer), Mexican American writer, and professor at Santa Clara University
- Francisco Jiménez de Cisneros (1436–1517), Spanish cardinal
- Xisco (footballer, born 1986), full name, Francisco Jiménez Tejada
- Édgar Francisco Jiménez (born 1951), Colombian artist
- Francisco Jiménez Merino (born 1959), Mexican IRP politician
- Francisco Herrera Jiménez (born 1965), Mexican IRP politician
- Francisco Manuel Vélez Jiménez (born 1991), Spanish footballer
- Francisco Nicasio Jiménez, Cuban orchestra conductor and dance band director
- Francisco Orozco y Jiménez (1864–1936), Mexican Roman Catholic archbishop

== See also ==
- Jiménez (disambiguation)
