= Ahmed Soukouna =

French footballer (born 1990)

Personal information
- Date of birth: 13 January 1990 (age 36)
- Place of birth: Paris, France
- Height: 1.82 m (6 ft 0 in)
- Position: Striker

Team information
- Current team: Béziers B

Youth career
- 1997–2001: Montpellier
- 2001–2004: Olympique Academy 34
- 2004–2005: Castelnau Le Crès
- 2005–2007: Toulouse

Senior career*
Years	Team	Apps	(Gls)
2008–2012	Toulouse	9	(0)
2012–2019	Béziers	135	(20)
2019–	Béziers B		
- * Club domestic league appearances and goals as of 22 November 2022

Ahmed Soukouna (born 13 January 1990) is a French professional footballer who plays as a striker for Régional 1 club Béziers B.

== Career ==
Soukouna began playing football at the age of 7 with Montpellier HSC, and moved to Toulouse FC in 2005. He made his professional debut on 29 October 2008, for Toulouse in a Ligue 1 game against Paris Saint-Germain.

On 3 August 2010, he was on trial with Preston North End.

Soukouna joined Béziers in 2012, competing in Championnat de France Amateur.

== Personal life ==
Ahmed Soukouna was born in Paris, France. He holds French and Malian nationalities.
