= Carlos Giménez =

Carlos Giménez or Carlos Gimenez may refer to:

- Carlos Giménez (comics) (born 1941), Spanish comics artist
- Carlos Giménez (cyclist) (born 1995), a Venezuelan cyclist
- Carlos Giménez (footballer) (born 2003), Spanish football defender
- Carlos A. Gimenez (born 1954), member of the United States House of Representatives
- Carlos E. Giménez (born 1959), former governor of Yaracuy State, Venezuela

Giménez as the second (maternal) surname:

- Carlos Romero Giménez (1890–1978), Spanish Republican officer and French Resistance member

== See also ==
- Carlos Jiménez (disambiguation)
