= Carlos Jiménez (disambiguation) =

Carlos Jiménez may refer to:

- Carlos Jiménez (Bolivian footballer)
- Carlos Jiménez (Costa Rican footballer)
- Carlos Jiménez Díaz (1898–1967), Spanish physician
- Carlos Jiménez Mabarak (1916–1994), Mexican composer
- Carlos Jiménez Macías (born 1950), Mexican politician and diplomat
- Carlos Jiménez (Carlos Jiménez Sánchez, Spanish former professional basketball player)
- Carlos Jiménez Vargas (fl. 1970s), Chilean military officer and public official
- Carlos Jiménez Villarejo (born 1935), Spanish public prosecutor
- Carlos Jiménez (volleyball)
- Carlos Javier Cuéllar Jiménez (born 1981), Spanish motocross footballer
- Carlos Campano Jiménez (born 1985), Spanish motocross rider
