= Stade de Sauclières =

Stadium in Béziers, France

Coordinates: 43°19′53″N 3°13′30″E

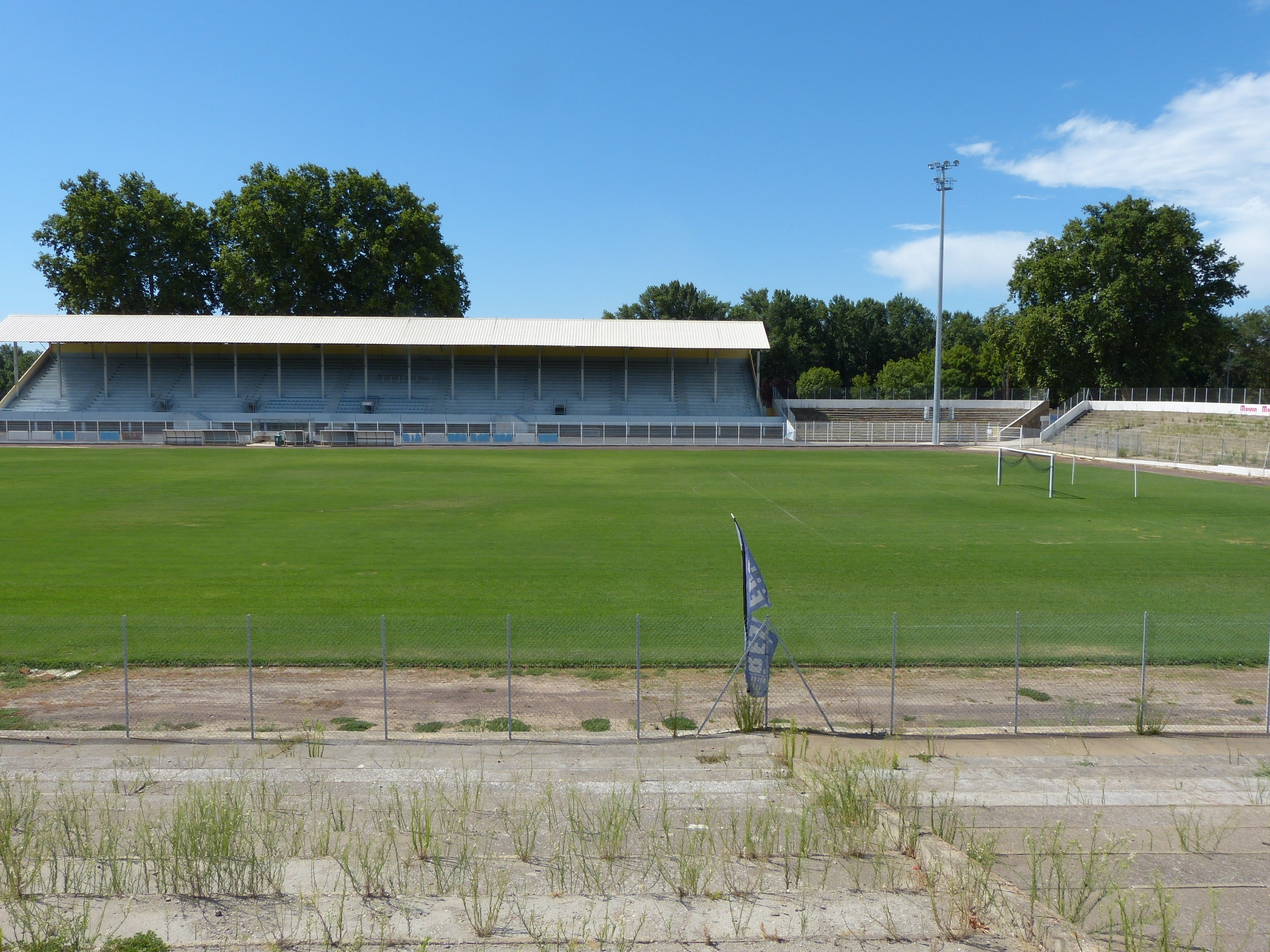
- Interactive map of Stade de Sauclières
- Location: Béziers, France
- Capacity: 2,004
- Surface: Grass

Tenant
- AS Béziers

Stade de Sauclières (French pronunciation: [stad də soklijɛʁ]) is a stadium in Béziers, France. It is currently used for football matches and is the home stadium of AS Béziers. The stadium holds 2,004 spectators.

== History ==
With a capacity of 12,000 (8,000 seated), it hosted matches for the Association Sportive de Béziers Hérault, the city's XV rugby club, and the Association Sportive de Béziers, the city's soccer club, until 1989, when the Stade de la Méditerranée was built.

It was also the venue for the final of the French rugby championship on April 17, 1921, when USA Perpignan beat Stade Toulousain 5-0.

Today, it is used by lower-division XV rugby clubs and the Avenir Sportif Béziers soccer team, and has hosted XIII rugby matches in the past.

The stadium gave a nickname to AS Béziers coach Raoul Barrière, who was known as the "Sorcier de Sauclières" (“wizard of Sauclières”) in the late 70s.

Due to the dilapidated state of the infrastructure, capacity was reduced to 2,004.
