= Grégory Vignal =

French footballer (born 1981)

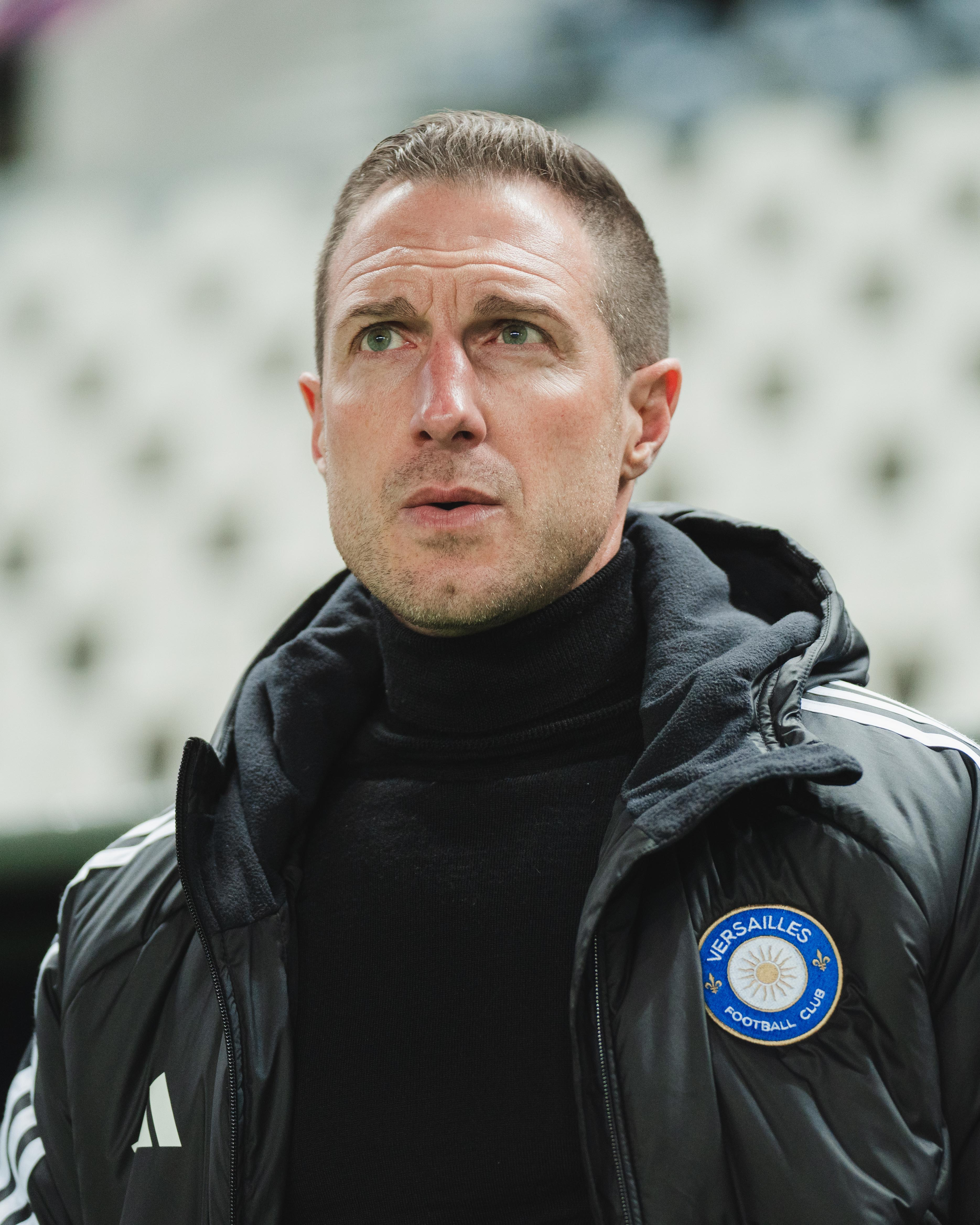
- Vignal in 2023

Personal information
- Full name: Grégory Vignal
- Date of birth: 19 July 1981 (age 45)
- Place of birth: Montpellier, Hérault, France
- Height: 1.82 m (6 ft 0 in)
- Position: Left back

Team information
- Current team: Blackburn Rovers (Under 21s Head Coach)

Youth career
- Castelnau Le Crès FC
- 1989–1999: Montpellier

Senior career*
Years	Team	Apps	(Gls)
1999–2000	Montpellier	0	(0)
2000–2005	Liverpool	11	(0)
2003	→ Bastia (loan)	15	(0)
2003	→ Rennes (loan)	5	(0)
2004	→ Espanyol (loan)	8	(1)
2004–2005	→ Rangers (loan)	30	(3)
2005–2006	Portsmouth	14	(0)
2006–2009	Lens	22	(0)
2007	→ 1. FC Kaiserslautern (loan)	9	(1)
2007–2008	→ Southampton (loan)	20	(3)
2009–2010	Birmingham City	8	(0)
2010	Atromitos	4	(0)
2012	Dundee United	0	(0)
2013	AS Béziers	13	(1)
Total		159	(9)

International career
2001	France U20	9	(0)
2002–2003	France U21	4	(0)

Managerial career
- 2019–2020: Rangers Women
- 2023–2024: Versailles
- * Club domestic league appearances and goals

Grégory Vignal (born 19 July 1981) is a French football coach and former professional player.

A left back, Vignal played in the top division in five countries – England, France, Spain, Scotland and Greece – and in the second tier in a sixth, Germany. At international level, he was a member of the France under-18 team that won the 2000 European Championships, represented France at under-20 level in the 2001 FIFA World Youth Championship, and was capped four times at under-21 level.

He was head coach of Scottish Women's Premier League club Rangers from 2019 to 2020, and worked in Marseille's academy before returning to Scotland as a youth coach at Dundee. After completing his UEFA Pro Licence, he spent three months as manager of Championnat National club Versailles.

== Early life ==
Grégory Vignal was born on 19 July 1981 in Montpellier, Hérault.

== Playing career ==
=== Liverpool and loans ===
Vignal began his career in the youth system of his home-town club, Montpellier. He soon established a reputation as a promising young player, and was signed by Liverpool in September 2000 for £500,000. He immediately impressed in his first reserve team outings and made his first team debut against Rotherham United in the FA Cup. He made a further six appearances during the 2000–01 season.

Vignal returned for the following season having featured in the World Youth Championship with the France Under-18 squad, and staked his claim for the left-back spot with some impressive performances at the start of the 2001–02 season. However, he found it hard to displace the reliable and experienced John Arne Riise. He made nine appearances that season.

He made just four appearances during the first half of the 2002–03 season and was loaned to Bastia for the remainder of the campaign on 11 January 2003.

During the 2003–04 campaign Vignal was again loaned out to Rennes for the first half of the season, and to Espanyol for the latter half.

Vignal had a season in Scotland at Rangers as the club regained the Scottish Premier League title, playing 42 games in all competitions and picking up a Scottish League Cup winner's medal as well as the league title.

=== Portsmouth ===
At the end of the 2004–05 season Vignal's Liverpool contract expired, and with him available on a free transfer Rangers wanted him to sign a permanent contract with them; however, he failed to agree terms, instead opting to move to Portsmouth. He was then released from Portsmouth after failing to impress Harry Redknapp on his return in the 2005–06 season.

=== RC Lens and loans ===
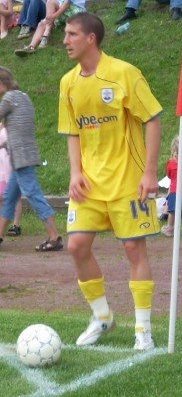
Vignal playing for Southampton in 2007

Vignal then moved to Lens on a free transfer and was loaned out to 1. FC Kaiserslautern for the second half of the season in January 2007.

After a trial, Vignal joined Southampton on a season-long loan on 27 July 2007. He scored his first goal for Southampton with a free kick in a 2–0 win over Leicester City in the FA Cup, and scored a penalty against Scunthorpe United in the Championship while playing with a broken arm in a cast. He scored another penalty in a 2–2 draw with Wolverhampton Wanderers before being sent off for an off-the-ball incident; the red card was rescinded on appeal. He scored four goals from 23 appearances in the 2007–08 season.

=== Birmingham City and later career ===
A trial with another Championship club, Queens Park Rangers, in the summer of 2009 did not result in a contract, but a strong performance for Birmingham City – newly promoted to the Premier League under the management of Alex McLeish, who had remained in contact with Vignal since they worked together at Rangers – earned him a one-year contract with an option for a further year. However, injuries and the return to fitness and form of Liam Ridgewell at left-back restricted Vignal to just nine first-team appearances, and Birmingham chose not to take up the option of a second year.

In July 2010, Vignal had trials with Sheffield United and Cardiff City. In September, he joined Greek Super League club Atromitos, but left again after three months and four appearances.

In January 2011, while on trial with AC Arles-Avignon, Vignal injured a knee. It still gave him trouble years later after three operations, and despite a two-month spell with Scottish Premier League club Dundee United in late 2012 and a season with CFA (fourth-tier) club AS Béziers, he never played again at professional level.

== Later career ==
In June 2013, Vignal took over the presidency of amateur club CE Palavas, based in the seaside commune of Palavas-les-Flots where his parents lived. Under his presidency, the team achieved three consecutive promotions and reached the seventh round of the Coupe de France for the first time. He stood down as president in favour of his father in 2017 to concentrate on the role of technical director.

Having spent the 2016–17 season as an assistant reserve coach at Montpellier, Vignal returned to Rangers in January 2018 as an academy coach, initially working with the under-14s and under-17s, and then with the under-18 team that won the 2018–19 SPFL Reserve League and Scottish Youth Cup. He also formed part of new first-team manager Steven Gerrard's support staff, and eventually left his academy role to scout for the first team.

In July 2019, following Rangers' decision to aim for a fully professional women's team as part of a women's and girls' football programme integrated into a restructured club, Amy McDonald became women's section manager and Vignal took her place as head coach of Rangers women. Malky Thomson came in to work alongside Vignal as joint head coach in January 2020, and Vignal left Rangers when his contract expired in June, having, according to the club, "played a pivotal role in the creation of the new full-time women's professional team ... [and] ensured a smooth transition for the Women's programme".

Vignal spent seven months with Olympique Marseille's academy, before returning to Scotland in 2021, initially as an assistant under-18s coach with Dundee under Gordon Strachan's management. He went on to take charge of the under-18s, and also worked with the reserves. He left Dundee in June 2023.

Already a holder of the UEFA A Licence, Vignal successfully completed the UEFA Pro Licence programme run by the French Football Federation from their Clairefontaine Football Training Institute in the 2022–23 season. He was appointed assistant to Laurent Peyrelade, manager of Championnat National club Versailles, ahead of the 2023–24 season, and took over the senior role after Peyrelade's dismissal in November, but lasted only ten matches before he himself was dismissed.

On 10 November 2025, Vignal joined Blackburn Rovers as under 21 head coach.

== Honours ==
Liverpool

- FA Cup: 2000–01
- UEFA Cup: 2000–01
- UEFA Super Cup: 2001

Rangers

- Scottish League Cup: 2004–05
- Scottish Premier League: 2004–05

Lens

- Ligue 2: 2008–09

France U18

- UEFA European Under-18 Championship: 2000
