= Romain Rambier =

French footballer (born 1981)

Personal information
- Date of birth: 29 August 1981 (age 45)
- Place of birth: Montpellier, France
- Height: 1.79 m (5 ft 10 in)
- Position: Right-back

Youth career
- Castelnau Le Crès
- Montpellier

Senior career*
Years	Team	Apps	(Gls)
2002–2004	Racing Ferrol	30	(0)
2004–2005	Cartagena	29	(1)
2005–2006	Libourne	41	(0)
2007–2009	Sète	83	(3)
2009	Castelnau Le Crès		
2010	Evian	35	(3)
2010–2013	Cannes	77	(0)
- * Club domestic league appearances and goals

Romain Rambier (born 29 August 1981) is a French former professional footballer who played as a right-back.

== Career ==
He played on the professional level in Segunda División for Racing Ferrol and in Ligue 2 for Libourne.
