= Carlos Jiménez (Costa Rican footballer) =

Costa Rican footballer (born 1954)

Personal information
- Date of birth: 27 June 1954 (age 72)
- Position: Defender

International career
Years	Team	Apps	(Gls)
- Costa Rica

Carlos Jiménez (born 27 June 1954) is a Costa Rican former footballer. He competed in the men's tournament at the 1980 Summer Olympics.
