= Édgar Francisco Jiménez =

Colombian artist (born 1951)

Édgar Francisco Jiménez (Pijiño, 1951) is a Colombian artist.

== Biography ==
He studied fine art at the National University of Colombia, in Bogotá, and graduated in 1977 and began to paint subjects of the Colombian Atlantic Coast, in oil and charcoal. In 1979 he won second prize at the first judged Regional Art Competition of Magdalena Province in Santa Marta, Colombia. After reading the novel "The Autumn of the Patriarch" by García Márquez, he was inspired to do a series of paintings that reflected the Magical Realism presented in the novel. This work was exhibited in 1980 in the Ocher Gallery, in Caracas, Venezuela.

In 1980 he went to Paris and there, at Atelier 17 with Stanley William Hayter, he studied colour etching. This let him develop the subject of cumbia, a rhythmic Colombian dance, but it was the powerful reference to his cultural identity that allowed him to show his own personal feelings of living abroad for the first time. In Spain he studied Lithography at the School of Arts and Crafts of Barcelona, where in 1982 he had his own individual exhibitions at the Cercle Artistic de Sant Lluc Gallery and the Sarro Gallery.

In September 1983 he obtained a scholarship from the Colombo-Chinese Cultural Exchange to do a postgraduate degree in traditional Chinese painting at China Central Academy of Fine Arts in Beijing, until 1986. There, with the technique and the philosophy of Chinese painting and calligraphy, he created a very particular style, combining the outlines of Chinese calligraphy with the movements of Colombian dances, giving his work a unique expression – a combination of Western and Eastern feelings.

After finishing his studies in Beijing, he travelled to Hong Kong where he taught Expression with Chinese ink in the Art Centre, and was the art teacher at the Lycée Français International Victor Segalen. In 1989 he began to explore acrylic on canvas, conserving dance as the main subject of his artistic creativity. Five years later, having participated in several seminars on spiritual development, he began to meditate while he painted, creating therefore a series of abstract paintings, which became his new form of expression. During his twelve years in Asia, he had individual exhibitions in Hong Kong, South Korea, Thailand, China, Japan and Macau. In search of new horizons in 1995, he went to Canada where he developed a series of erotic paintings inspired by the erotic mysticism of the Tantra, which were exhibited in 1996 in the Foundation of Contemporary Art Gallery in Miami and the Here and Now Gallery in Toronto. Since then he has had solo exhibitions in Colombia, Hong Kong and Taiwan, and participated in group exhibitions in Brazil, Peru, Chile, Ecuador, Colombia, Dominican Republic, Taiwan, the United States, Germany, Egypt and Canada, where he participated in the travelling exhibition Hands for a positive change, in the National Exhibition Centre of Esteban, the Library of Weyburn and Galerie des Arts Contemporains of Montreal, organized by the Canadian Heritage and the Colombian Embassy in Ottawa.

Enrico Bucci has called his style "fragmentation of the forms", and adds: "It looks like pointillism at first sight, but it is not, it is Edgar Francisko’s technique, an application of the colour in dots that, when watching, give us the sensation that the figures have become paralysed or petrified in the captured animated moment. Thus movement and immobility become a new pictorial invention". His paintings are in the permanent collections of the Museum of Graphical Arts and the Center Zulian -American of Maracaibo, Venezuela, the Cultural Center of Hong Kong, the Art Collections of the Colombian Consulates in New York, Miami and Hong Kong, the Art Collection of the Embassy of Colombia and the Venezuelan Embassy, Beijing, China, the Berlin International School and the Embassy of Ecuador in Berlin, Germany, theart collection of Fenalco in Bogota, Colombia; the Museum

== Exhibitions ==
- 1977 Colombo-German Institute of Cultural Studies, Bogota, Colombia.
- 1978 Museum of Art, University of Antioquia, Medellin, Colombia.
- 1979 Institute of Cultural Studies, Santa Martha, Magdalena, Colombia. “La Escuela” Gallery, Barranquilla, Colombia. “Libros y Arte” Gallery, Barranquilla, Colombia.
- 1980 “Ocre Gallery”, Caracas, Venezuela. Zulian-American Institute of Cultural Studies. Maracaibo, Venezuela.
- 1982 “Cercle Artistic de Sant Lluc” Gallery, Barcelona, Spain. “El Sarró” Gallery, Barcelona, Spain.
- 1983 “El Chaman” Gallery, Tunja, Colombia.
- 1986 French Cultural Centre, Exhibition Hall, Beijing, China.
- 1987 Alliance Française, Hong Kong. “Soo Gallery”, Seoul, South Korea.
- 1988 Silpakorn University’s Art Gallery, Bangkok, Thailand.
- 1991 “Pasqua Gallery”, Hong Kong.
- 1992 ArtEspacio Gallery, Bogotá, Colombia. Status Gallery, Santa Martha, Colombia. French Cultural Centre, Segalen Room, Hong Kong.
- 1994 Artland Gallery, Hong Kong.
- 1996 “Ways of spiritual search”, Here and Now Gallery, Toronto, Canada “The mystic eroticism of Tantra”, Foundation for the Contemporary Arts Gallery, Coral Gables, Miami, USA. “Institutional Museum” of Comfamiliar Cultural Centre, Barranquilla, Colombia.
- 1997 Museo Bolivariano of Contemporary Art, “Granahorrar Gallery”, Santa Martha, Colombia, “Contemporary Art Hall” Gobernación de Sucre, Sincelejo, Colombia.
- 1998 The Tee Club, Hong Kong.
- 1999 The World Trade Centre Club. Taipei, Taiwan. The Exchange Club. Taipei, Taiwan.
- 2000 Embassy of Colombia in Beijing, China.
- 2002 Berlitz Language Centre, Hong Kong.
- 2004 Art Scene Gallery, Shanghai, China
- 1981 Young Colombian Artists Exhibition, “Atelier 76”, Paris, France.
- 1982 “Quick Painting Competition”, San Andres, Barcelone, Spain.
- 1983 International Fair of Arts (ARCO), Madrid, Spain.
- 1984 “Colombian Art Week”, Beijing Exhibition Hall, Beijing, China.
- 1986 “Five Colombian Painters in China”, Art Gallery of China, Beijing. Postgraduate Students from the Beijing Central Academy of Fine Arts, at the “Painting and Calligraphy Gallery”, Wuxi, China.
- 1988 “Living with art”, Pao Sui Loong Gallery, Art Center, Hong Kong.
- 1989 Contemporary Hong Kong Art Biennial Exhibition 1989, City Hall’s Museum of Art, Hong Kong. “Four Colombian Painters in Asia”, City Hall Exhibition Gallery, Hong Kong.
- 1991 Hong Kong Art Centre Tutors Exhibition, Pao Sui Loong Gallery, Hong Kong.
- 1992 Latin American Art Exhibition, Hong Kong Visual Arts Centre, Hong Kong.
- 1993 Colombian Artists Exhibition, Promo-Arte Gallery, Tokyo, Japan.
- 1997 First Colombian-Canadian Cultural Week, North York City Hall, Toronto, Canada. “Still life”, Praxis Gallery, Toronto, Canada.
- 1998 “Hands for a positive change”, Two Colombian Artists travelling exhibition sponsored by the Colombian Embassy in Ottawa and Canadian Heritage. Esteban National Exhibition Centre, Esteban. The Weyburn Library, Wayburn and “Galerie d’Arts Contemporains”, Montreal, Canada. “Latin American Horizons”, Organised by The Patron of Peruvian Arts. Scarborough City Hall, Toronto, Canada. Ibero American Countries Art Exhibition, “Almada Negreiros” Art Gallery, Consulate of Portugal. Toronto, Canada. “Latin American Expressions”, organized by the “Grupo Cultura” at the American Intercontinental University of Atlanta. U.S.A. “Voyages”, Foyer Gallery, organized by the “Foro Latinoamericano”, Ottawa City Hall. Ottawa, Canada. “Six Colombian Artists in Brazil”, Intercontinental Hotel exhibition Hall, São Paulo, Brazil.“Taipei International art Fair 98”, Taipei, Taiwan.
- 1999 “Unity within diversity”, JIRART Group, “Enrico Bucci Gallery”, Santiago, Chile. “Utopia”, organized by Foro Latinoamericano, Hull, Quebec, Canada. Third Colombian-Canadian Cultural Week, Hall “La Rotunda”, Toronto City Hall. Toronto, Canada. “Latin American Expressions”, Grupo Cultura at Georgia State University’s Gallery, Atlanta, USA. “Latin American Expressions”, Grupo Cultura, at Art Station. Stone Mountain, USA.
- 2000 “Hall Francisco de Paula Santander”, Colombian Consulate, Coral Gables, Miami, Florida, USA. “Vida”, JIRART Group exhibition at the Marco Bonta Gallery, Santiago de Chile. Felipe Cossio del Pomar Gallery, Lima, Peru. Museum Casa de la Cultura Ecuatoriana, Quito, Ecuador. Fourth Colombian-Canadian Cultural Week, Toronto Metro Hall, Toronto, Canada.
- 2002 JIRART Group, Christian Siret Gallery, Jardins de Luxemburg, Paris. France. JIRART Group, Egyptian Ministry of Culture Opera House, Cairo, Egypt.
- 2003 JIRART Group, Museum of Dominican Man, Santo Domingo, Dominican Republic. JIRART Group, “Leven-Life”, Philipp Johnson Haus, Berlin, Germany.
- 2004 “Fourth Fraternity Fest”, Homage to Pierre Elliot Trudeau, Mississauga City Hall”, Mississauga, Canada.
- 2005 Fifth Fraternity Fest, Mississauga City Hall, Mississauga. Canada.
- 2006 Opening spaces, Uno A Gallery, Bogota, Colombia.
