= Jiménez =

Jiménez or Jimenez may refer to:

== People ==
- Jiménez (surname), including a list of people with the name
- Jiménez dynasty, a medieval Iberian ruling family, including a list of members

== Places ==
=== Mexico ===
- Ciudad Jiménez, officially José Mariano Jiménez, in Chihuahua
  - Jiménez Territory, 1914–1917
- Jiménez, Coahuila
  - Jiménez Municipality, Coahuila
- Jiménez, Tamaulipas

=== Other places ===
- Jiménez Department, Santiago del Estero, Argentina
- Jiménez (canton), Cartago, Costa Rica
- Jimenez, Misamis Occidental, Philippines
- Jiménez, Río Grande, Puerto Rico, U.S.
- Jiménez Municipality, Lara, Venezuela

== Other uses ==
- Jimenez Arms, later JA Industries, American firearms manufacturer
- Jimenez Novia, a 1995 one-off sports car built by Ramon Jimenez

== See also ==
- Giménez
- Cadereyta Jiménez, a city in Nuevo León, Mexico
- Huautla de Jiménez, a town in Oaxaca, Mexico
- Grupo León Jimenes, a company in the Dominican Republic
