= Castelnau Le Crès FC =

Football club based in Le Crès, France

Castlenau Le Crès FC
- Founded: 1995
- Ground: Stade Jacques Robert
- Capacity: 1,000

Castelnau Le Crès FC is a French football club located in Le Crès, Hérault, Languedoc-Roussillon.

== History ==
Castelnau Le Crès FC was founded in 1995 in a merger between two neighbouring clubs, L'Entente Crèssoise and Entente de Castelnau. Le Crès began playing in the Division D'Honneur Languedoc-Roussillon in the 1995–96 season. They won the league in 2003 and were promoted to the CFA 2. The club spent three seasons in the CFA 2 from 2003 to 2006 and were relegated back to the DH Languedoc-Roussillon. The next season Le Crès were relegated to the Division Honneur Regionale, Languedoc-Roussillon where they remain today.

== Colours ==
Castelnau Le Crès FC play in green shirts, white shorts and green socks at home. Their away kit is black shirts, white shorts and black socks.

== Stadium ==
Castelnau Le Crès FC play their home matches at the Stade Jacques Robert. It has a capacity of 1,000.

== Managers ==
- 1991–1992: Albert Rust
- 2002–2003: Nenad Stojković
- 2008–2009: Hugh Babeur
- 2010–2011: Pascal Dagany

== Former players ==
- Ugo Bonnet
- Grégory Carmona
- Sébastien Gimenez
- Cédric Joqueviel
- Yvann Maçon
- Romain Rambier
- Ahmed Soukouna
- Grégory Vignal

== Achievements ==
- Division D'Honneur Languedoc-Roussillon
  - Winners (1): 2002–03
