= Sébastien Gimenez =

French footballer and coach (born 1974)

Personal information
- Date of birth: 31 March 1974 (age 52)
- Place of birth: Avignon, France
- Height: 1.78 m (5 ft 10 in)
- Position: Goalkeeper

Team information
- Current team: Monaco U19 (goalkeeping coach)

Senior career*
Years	Team	Apps	(Gls)
1997–1998	Castelnau Le Crès		
1998–2001	Arles	2	(0)
2001–2002	Castelnau Le Crès		
2002–2003	Gallia Club Lunel		
2003–2005	Arles		
2005–2006	Sète	1	(0)
2006–2010	Nîmes	38	(0)
- * Club domestic league appearances and goals

Sébastien Gimenez (born 21 March 1974) is a French football coach and former professional footballer who is a goalkeeping coach for the Monaco under-19 team.

== Playing career ==
Gimenez mainly played football at the lower level for Castelnau Le Crès and Arles, before moving to Sète in 2005, a club which had recently won promotion to Ligue 2. He made his professional debut for Sète on 13 January 2006, replacing injured starter Olivier Labruna in the 22nd minute of a 2–0 home loss to Lorient. This remained his only professional appearance.

== Coaching career ==
Following his retirement at the end of the 2009–10 season as part of Nîmes, Gimenez remained with Nîmes and becoming goalkeeping coach on Jean-Michel Cavalli's coaching staff. He remained in this position until 2022, where he became goalkeeping coach for the Monaco under-19s.
