= Blagnac FC =

French football club

- Full name: Blagnac Football Club
- Founded: 1962
- Ground: Complexe Andromède; Blagnac, Toulouse
- Capacity: 6,000
- Chairman: Patrick Marjoux
- Manager: Fabrice Dubois
- League: National 3
- 2024–25: Championnat National 3 Group A, 8th of 14th
- Website: http://blagnacfc.com
Home colours

Blagnac Football Club (French pronunciation: [blaɲak futbol klœb]) is a French association football club founded in 1963. They are based in Blagnac, Toulouse and are currently playing in Championnat National 3, the fifth tier in the French football league system. They play at the Complexe Andromède since 2006.

== History ==
Blagnac Football Club was founded relatively late in 1962 after a Frenchman by the name of Louis Héraud discovered that the town of Blagnac had no football club. Héraud, along with his supporters, proceeded to go door-to-door collecting up to 20 euros from local Blagnac townspeople in order to begin the process of creating the club. However, it wasn't until a man commonly called Mr. Béranger, a manager of a restaurant in the local airport agreed to fund the club. The club was officially formed on 4 March 1962 as Football Club Blagnacais. Béranger was given the role of president, while Héraud was given dual-roles as vice president and secretary general. The club's first manager was André Augé. In the club's early years of existence, they primarily played with players from the local and regional level of French football, as well as players well past their prime that came from Toulouse FC.

== Honours ==
- Vice-champion de France Division 4: 1990
- Champion DH Midi-Pyrénées: 1988
- Coupe de Midi-Pyrénées: 1981

== Current squad ==
As of 21 September 2025

Note: Flags indicate national team as defined under FIFA eligibility rules; some limited exceptions apply. Players may hold more than one non-FIFA nationality.

| No. | Pos. | Nation | Player |
|---|---|---|---|
| — | GK | MAR | Foued Baba Alla |
| — | GK | Mayotte | Ilam Djailane |
| — | DF | FRA | Ismaël Debart |
| — | DF | SEN | Ibrahima Sow |
| — | DF | FRA | Vincent Gauthier |
| — | DF | FRA | Axel Burlet |
| — | DF | FRA | Nassim Lamliki |
| — | DF | FRA | Rémi Roldan |
| — | DF | FRA | Sammy Abbani |
| — | MF | FRA | Dorian Santisteva |
| — | MF | FRA | Tom Husson |
| — | MF | FRA | Nicolas Bories |

| No. | Pos. | Nation | Player |
|---|---|---|---|
| — | MF | FRA | Iliesse Lamhaf |
| — | MF | FRA | Clément Boudjema |
| — | MF | FRA | Thibaut Métayer |
| — | MF | FRA | Yannis Wilibona |
| — | FW | MAR | Marouane Eddaraaoui |
| — | FW | FRA | Dimitri Quenet |
| — | FW | FRA | Kaddour Zalmate |
| — | FW | FRA | Paul Bonneau |
| — | FW | GUI | Abdoulaye Sackho |
| — | FW | FRA | Evan Noël |
| — | FW | FRA | Jalal Amri |

== Notable players ==
- (France) Romain Perraud (youth)

== Statistics and records ==
=== Statistics ===
- Associates: 4,000
- Most goals scored in one match home: Blagnac 7 – Athletic Club Avignonnais 0 (2009–10).

=== Records ===
- In the 2000–2001 and 2001–2002 seasons, finished with an accumulative league unbeaten run after 62 games.
- Jean-Germain de la Roche holds the record for goals in the history of Blagnac (304 goals).
- Jean-Germain de la Roche is the top scorer in the history of Blagnac's Cup Runs (41 goals).

== Managers ==
- (France) Jean-Louis Faure (2005–2008)
- (France) Benoît Tihy (2007–2009)
- (France) Wilfried Niflore (2016–2019)
- (France) Alain Bénédet (2019–2022)
- (France) Fabrice Dubois (2022–)
