= Montauban FCTG =

Football club in Montauban, France

Montauban
- Full name: Montauban Football Club Tarn-et-Garonne
- Short name: MFCTG
- Founded: 1953
- Stadium: Stade de la Fobio
- President: Jean-Michel Malavelle
- Manager: Chaïb Ouali
- League: Régional 2 Occitanie; Group C
- Website: https://montaubanfctg.fr/

Montauban Football Club Tarn-et-Garonne is a football club based in Montauban, France. As of the 2021–22 season, it competes in the Régional 2, the seventh tier of French football. The club's colours are yellow and blue.

== History ==
Founded in 1953, the club was formerly known as Montauban FC until 2004. The furthest round they have reached in the Coupe de France is the round of 64, which they have done on four occasions. Montauban notably played nine seasons in the Division 3 in the 1970s and 80s.

== Notable players ==
- (France) Valentin Rosier (youth)

== Honours ==
Montauban FCTG honours
Honour	No.	Years
Coupe du Midi	4	1955–56, 1956–57, 1976–77, 1992–93
Promotion d'Honneur	2	1954–55, 1968–69
Division d'Honneur	2	1974–75, 1993–94
1ère Division District	1	1953–54
Championnat National 3	1	1995–96
Division d'Honneur Régionale	1	2013–14
