= AF Lozère =

French football club

- Full name: Avenir Foot Lozère
- Nickname(s): AFL
- Founded: 1920
- Ground: Stade Jean Jacques Delmas, Mende, France
- Chairman: Philippe Lauraire
- Manager: Franco Vignola
- League: Regional 1, Occitanie
- 2018–19: National 3 Group H, 13th (relegated)
- Website: http://www.afl-48.fr
Home colours	Third colours

Avenir Foot Lozère is a French football club located in Mende, France. It plays in Regional 1, Occitanie, being relegated from Championnat National 3 in 2019 after three seasons in the division. The team's colours are blue and yellow.
