= AS Béziers (2007) =

French football club

Béziers
- Full name: Avenir Sportif Béziers
- Nickname: Les Blaugranas
- Founded: 2007; 19 years ago
- Ground: Stade de Sauclières, Béziers
- Capacity: 2,004
- Chairman: Gérard Rocquet
- Manager: Colbert Marlot
- League: Régional 1 Occitanie
- 2022–23: National 3 Group H, 1st (relegated administratively)
- Website: https://www.asb-foot.com
Home colours	Away colours	Third colours

Avenir Sportif Béziers is a French association football club founded in 2007 by the merger of AS Saint-Chinian, FC Béziers Méditerranée, and the Béziers-Méditerranée Football Cheminots. They are based in the town of Béziers and their home stadium is the Stade de Sauclières.

The idea to merge the three football teams in order to have a championship team came in 2006, but a Championnat de France amateur (CFA) team was not created until 2007. Béziers won promotion to professional football in 2017–18 for the first time, and played in Ligue 2 for one season. As of the 2023–24 season it plays in Régional 1, after several recent relegations on and off the field.

== History ==
Since 2006, a fusion project between the three biterrois clubs, the Avenir Sportif Saint-Chinian, the Football Club Béziers Méditerranée and the Béziers-Méditerranée Football Cheminots, is pushed back by diverse administrative issues. One of the issues, seemingly minor, was the choice of the colors of the new club. while Avenir Sportif Saint-Chinian rooted for yellow and black, the two other clubs wished to see the club adorn the red and blue, the colors of the city of Béziers.

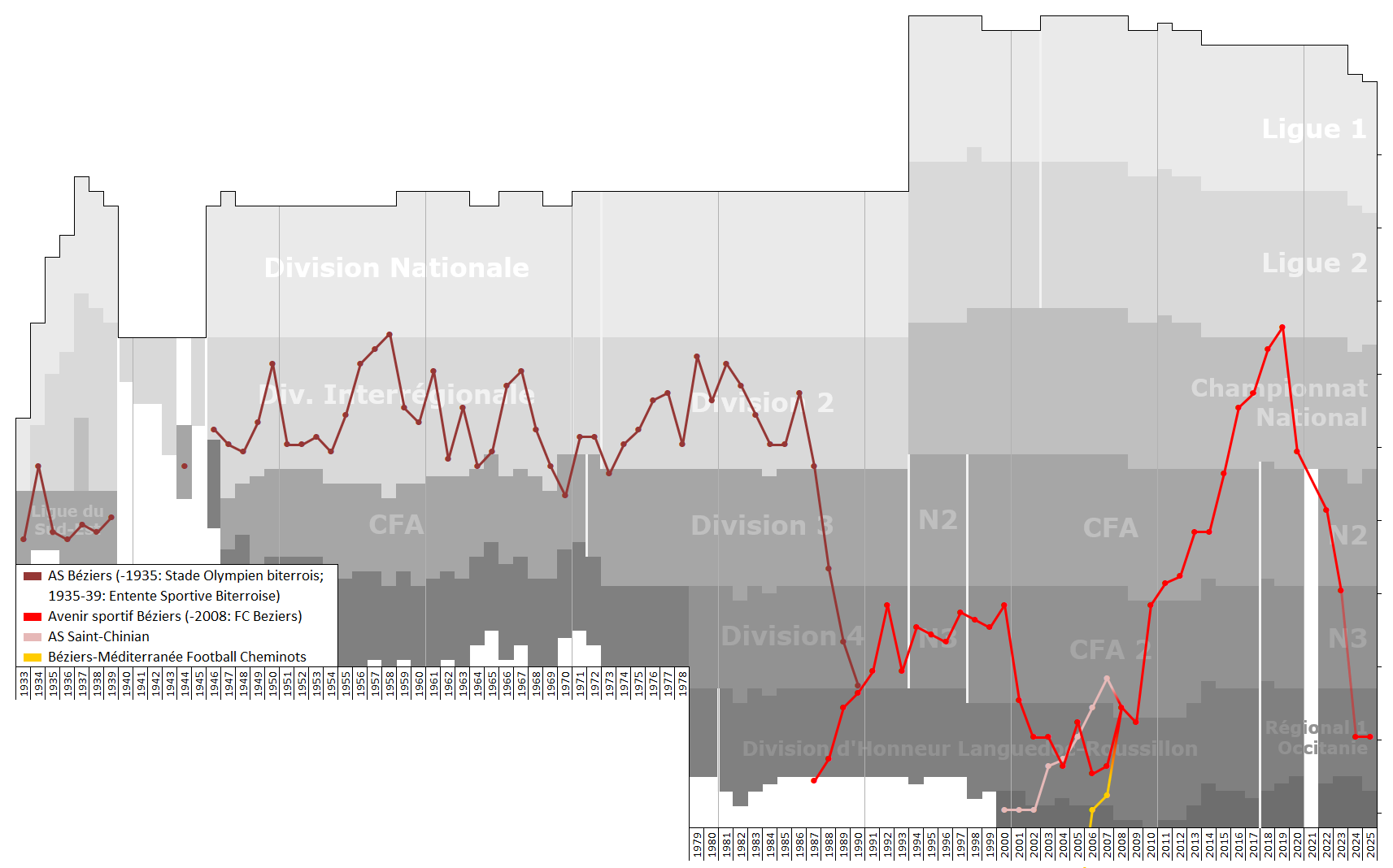
Historical league performance chart of AS Beziers

In 2007, the three clubs reached a settlement, and fused into the AS Béziers. ASB then took part in the CFA 2, with a division coming from the former club of AS Saint-Chinian, the best ranked of the three clubs before the fusion. However this first season was devoted to sportive and administrative amelioration, and the club was relegated in the honor division of their league at the end of the season.

At the end of the following year, ASB was back in the CFA 2, and was the first of its group securing promotion only two years after being relegated in regional elite, earning the title of champions of the CFA 2. In its first season in the CFA, AS Béziers went up and down and was nearly relegated before being reinstated due to the high number of administrative relegations in other clubs.

In the three following seasons, the club held its ground in the low in the ranks of the CFA, the 2014–15 season was historic for Xavier Collin and his players since the club was promoted into the Championnat National for the first time in its history. It was an exceptional season for the club, even if the title of the CFA was won by CS Sedan Ardennes. Xavier Collin, in high spirits due to his title of best coach of the CFA of the year, prepared for the first season of the club in the third level of French football, imitating past teams from Béziers who brought the club of AS Béziers in second division in the 1980s

After three seasons of the club maintaining itself in the Championnat National, it ends on the second step of the podium of the championship under Mathieu Chabert on the last day of the 2017–18 season, cementing its spot in French professional football and allowing the club to move into the Ligue 2.

The club played just one season in Ligue 2, and then suffered back-to-back relegations, to the fourth tier. In the 2021–22 season it finished 8th in its group, but was administratively relegated again to Championnat National 3, the fifth tier. In the 2022–23 season, the club finished top of its National 3 table, but was denied promotion after review by the DNCG. A month later, the DNCG reviewed the club again, and relegate it to Régional 1 for financial irregularities.

== Sporting history ==
At the end of the 2017–18 season, AS Béziers has participated in its history three times in the Championnat National, five times in the CFA and two times in CFA 2.

It has also participated in eleven Coupe de France.

The competitions won by the club are the 2009 DH Languedoc-Roussillon and 2010 Championnat National 3, it was also vice-champion of the 2017–18 Championnat National.

== Stadiums ==
The main home stadium of the club is the Stade de Sauclières previously used by the AS Béziers Hérault club in its glory days. It is located on avenue Fernand Sastre in Béziers.

The club may also be lent the Stade Raoul-Barrière by the rugby club AS Béziers Hérault.

The Stade de la Présidente on avenue Pierre de Coubertin is also used for training.

Finally, the Stade de la Plaine de Montfloures is also used by the club.

== Notable players ==
- (France) Tristan Crama
