= 2025–26 Coupe de France preliminary rounds, Occitanie =

The 2025–26 Coupe de France preliminary rounds, Occitanie was the qualifying competition to decide which teams from the leagues of the Occitanie region of France took part in the main competition from the seventh round.

A total of eleven teams qualified from the Occitanie preliminary rounds, one more than last season.

In 2024–25, Régional 1 side Union Saint-Jean FC progressed furthest in the main competition of the ten teams from the region, reaching the Round of 64 by beating Championnat National side FC Versailles 78 in the eighth round, before losing to Ligue 1 team AS Monaco FC.

== Draws and fixtures ==
On 9 July 2025, the league announced that 500 teams from the region had entered the competition. The draw for the first two rounds was originally due to take place on 10 July 2025, but had to be postponed due to late changes in eligibility. The draws eventually took place on 17 July 2025, and were published district-by-district as is usual for the region.

The third round draw was published on 2 September 2025, with the ten regional teams playing in Championnat National 3 entering at this stage. The fourth round draw, including the only Championnat National 2 team from the region, was published on 16 September 2025. The fifth round draw was published on 30 September 2025. The sixth round draw was published on 17 October 2025.

=== First round ===
These matches are from the Aude district, and were played on 23 and 24 August 2025.

First Round Results: Occitanie (Aude)
Tie no	Home team (Tier)	Score	Away team (Tier)
1.	FC Quillan Haute Vallée (11)	0–7	Olympic Cuxac-d'Aude (9)
2.	Razès Olympique (9)	0–1	FC Cazilhac (9)
3.	US Minervois (9)	3–0	FC Villegly (10)
4.	Olympique Montréalais (12)	0–6	AS Espéraza (10)
5.	ASC Mahoraise Carcassonne (11)	1–0	FC Cougaing (11)
6.	FC Caux-et-Sauzens (11)	7–1	MJC Gruissan (10)
7.	USA Pezens (9)	5–1	FC Massogien (10)
8.	Limoux FC (10)	5–1	Souilhe FC (10)
9.	FC Alaric (11)	7–1	RC Malepère (11)
10.	ES Fanjeaux (10)	5–2	Haut-Minervois Olympique (9)
11.	Olympique Corbières Sud Minervois (9)	0–4	FC Saint-Nazairois (9)
12.	Trapel FC (9)	2–4	Leucate FC (10)
13.	FC Villedubert (10)	3–5	ES Arzens (11)
14.	FS Narbonnais (12)	0–6	Corbières FC (10)

These matches are from the Ariège district, and were played on 23 and 24 August 2025.

First Round Results: Occitanie (Ariège)
Tie no	Home team (Tier)	Score	Away team (Tier)
1.	FC Vernetois (11)	8–3	US Mas-d'Azil (10)
2.	FC Foix (9)	0–3 (Note: Tie won by means of forfeit.)	EF Saint-Paul avec Mercus (9)
3.	US Lescure (9)	0–7	AS Rieux-de-Pelleport (9)
4.	FC Coussa-Hers (9)	1–1 (3–5 p)	EN Mazères (9)
5.	Entente Varilhes-Saint-Jean-de-Verges (10)	1–4	FC Mirepoix 09 (9)

These matches are from the Aveyron district, and were played on 21, 23 and 24 August 2025.

First Round Results: Occitanie (Aveyron)
Tie no	Home team (Tier)	Score	Away team (Tier)
1.	JS Rance Rougier (10)	1–1 (9–10 p)	FC Naucellois (10)
2.	FC Aubrac 98 (11)	1–1 (1–3 p)	US Réquistanaise (9)
3.	Association Saint-Laurentaise Cantonale Canourguaise (10)	3–0 (Note: Tie won by means of forfeit.)	FC Agen-Gages (11)
4.	US Dourdou (11)	4–4 (2–4 p)	US Bas Rouergue (9)
5.	Stade Villefranchois (11)	1–1 (5–4 p) (Note: Tie reversed from original draw.)	US Pays Alzuréen (10)
6.	Foot Rouergue (12)	2–2 (1–4 p)	Entente Villecomtal-Mouret-Pruines-Entraygues (10)
7.	Méridienne d'Olt FC (10)	4–0	US Penchot Livinhac (11)
8.	ASC Mahorais Rodez (10)	0–3	ÉS Combes (10)
9.	US Argence/Viadène (10)	1–3	US Larzac Vallées (11)
10.	AS Aguessac (9)	3–0	AS Saint-Geniez-d'Olt (10)
11.	AS Vabraise (11)	0–0 (2–3 p)	Inter du Causse Bezonnes (11)
12.	Entente Salles Curan/Curan (11)	0–3	Foot Vallon (9)
13.	JS Lévézou (9)	10–1	AS Moyrazès (10)

These matches are from the Gard district, and were played on 24 August 2025.

First Round Results: Occitanie (Gard)
Tie no	Home team (Tier)	Score	Away team (Tier)
1.	Olympique Mas de Mingue (11)	1–3	ES Barjac (9)
2.	Zephyrs de Congénies (12)	3–4	JSO Aubord (12)
3.	OC Bellegarde (11)	4–3 (Note: Tie reversed from original draw.)	AS Caissargues (10)
4.	Calvisson FC (10)	3–6	US Monoblet (9)
5.	FC Cabassut (9)	0–2	CO Soleil Levant Nîmes (10)
6.	Omnisports Saint-Hilaire-La Jasse (10)	2–0	GC Quissac (11)
7.	AS Saint-Christol-lès-Alès (10)	2–4	Pays Viganais Aigoual FC (10)
8.	FC Bagnols Escanaux (10)	0–3 (Note: Tie won by means of forfeit.)	CA Bessegeoise (9)
9.	AS Cendras (11)	0–3	FC Langlade (10)
10.	US Garons (10)	1–5	EF Vézénobres Cruviers (10)
11.	OC Redessan (9)	6–0	ES Théziers (10)
12.	SC Saint-Martin-de-Valgalgues (10)	3–2	SA Cigalois (10)
13.	All Five Académie (10)	2–1	Olympique Fourquésien (9)
14.	RC Saint-Laurent-des-Arbres (12)	3–0	AS Saint-Paulet-de-Caisson (11)
15.	FC Vatan (10)	3–1	RC Générac (9)
16.	AC Pissevin Valdegour (9)	4–3	FC Val de Cèze (9)
17.	Mejannes FC (12)	1–6	US Pujaut (11)

These matches are from the Gers district, and were played on 23 and 24 August 2025.

First Round Results: Occitanie (Gers)
Tie no	Home team (Tier)	Score	Away team (Tier)
1.	Cologne FC (9)	2–1	Sud Astarac Seissan Foot (9)
2.	Forza Labéjan-Saint-Jean-le-Comtal (9)	3–4	Lombez OFC (10)
3.	SC Solomiac (11)	1–3	ES Gimontoise (9)
4.	AS Monferran-Savès (10)	5–4	Condom FC (10)
5.	AS Ségoufielle Pujaudran Occitanie (9)	4–1	Eauze FC (9)
6.	AS Manciet (11)	1–1 (4–2 p)	UA Vic-Fezensac (9)
7.	Mauvezin FC (9)	4–0	JS Tougetoise (10)

These matches are from the Haute-Garonne district, and were played on 22, 23 and 24 August 2025.

First Round Results: Occitanie (Haute-Garonne)
Tie no	Home team (Tier)	Score	Away team (Tier)
1.	Toulouse Cheminots Marengo Sports (12)	1–3	Labège FC (10)
2.	FC Autan (12)	0–2	US Bouloc Saint-Sauveur (9)
3.	Toulouse Football Sud (12)	0–7	Lauragais FC (10)
4.	Jeunesse Athlétique Club (11)	1–1 (1–3 p)	Entente des 3M (11)
5.	FC Mabroc (12)	2–3	EFC Aurignac (9)
6.	JS Brax (9)	1–1 (5–6 p)	ES Saint-Simon (9)
7.	Toulouse Rangueil FC (9)	6–2 (Note: Toulouse Rangueil FC penalised for fielding a suspended player, ES Le Fousseret-Mondavezan qualified.)	ES Le Fousseret-Mondavezan (10)
8.	US Bagnères-de-Luchon Sports-Cierp-Gaud-Marignac (10)	3–1	US Bérat (10)
9.	FC Saleichois (13)	2–4	FC Oô Larboust (12)
10.	Cap Jeunes 31 (10)	5–1	UE Bossòst (11) (Spain)
11.	FC Beauzelle (10)	1–1 (2–4 p)	Football Algérien Toulousain (10)
12.	ASC Gagnac (13)	0–3	Toulouse Nord FC (11)
13.	Fontenilles FC (11)	1–2	AS Castelnau-d'Estrétefonds (9)
14.	Rieumes FC (13)	1–17	Saint-Lys Olympique FC (9)
15.	Toulouse Football Compans Caffarelli (9)	6–1	Grenade FC (10)
16.	Pointis-Inard OC (13)	0–6	AS Toulouse Lardenne (10)
17.	FC Labarthe-Rivière (11)	3–4	RC Muret (11)
18.	FC Bessières-Buzet (13)	2–2 (4–2 p)	US Castelginest (9)
19.	FC Canal Nord (11)	1–3	US Encausse-Soueich-Ganties (10)
20.	Confluent Lacroix/Saubens/Pinsaguel (10)	2–2 (5–4 p)	AF Villeneuvois (11)
21.	US Toulouse (12)	3–0 (Note: Tie won by means of forfeit.)	US Gratentour (13)
22.	Entente Landorthe-Labarthe-Estancarbon-Savarthès (10)	2–4	JS Auzielle Lauzerville (10)
23.	Ramonville Coteaux FC (12)	1–3	FC Bagatelle (9)
24.	US Sainte-Foy Football (11)	3–1	Toulouse Olympique Aviation Club (9)
25.	US Labastidette (13)	1–12	Toulouse ACF (10)
26.	FC Mahorais Toulouse (11)	1–0	ASPTT Grand Toulouse (12)
27.	Save et Garonne FC (11)	2–3	AC Garona (9)
28.	AS Villeneuve-Lécussan (12)	2–5	AS Hersoise (11)
29.	US Riveraine (11)	2–0	FC Quint-Fonsegrives (11)
30.	Gardouch OC (12)	3–0	Lagardelle Miremont Sports (10)

These matches are from the Hérault district, and were played on 23 and 24 August 2025.

First Round Results: Occitanie (Hérault)
Tie no	Home team (Tier)	Score	Away team (Tier)
1.	US Lunel Viellloise (12)	1–1 (5–4 p)	US Saint-Martinoise (12)
2.	AS Pierrots Teyran (13)	3–6	AS Valerguoise (11)
3.	Port Marianne Montpellier FC (12)	0–4	FC Boujan (12)
4.	RC Aspiran (13)	1–4	Arceaux Montpellier (9)
5.	Avenir Castriote (11)	1–0	Aurore Saint-Gilloise (10)
6.	AS Bessanaise (11)	4–3 (Note: Tie reversed from original draw.)	AO Maraussanais (11)
7.	FC Domitia (10)	0–2	FC Lavérune (10)
8.	AS Croix d'Argent (12)	4–2	ÉS Mudaison (13)
9.	AS Montarnaud-Saint-Paul-Vaihauques-Murviel (13)	1–10	AC Alignanais (10)
10.	Pointe Courte AC Sète (10)	3–0 (Note: Tie won by means of forfeit.)	USO Florensac-Pinet (10)
11.	FC Thongue et Libron (11)	0–2	ES Cazouls-Maraussan-Maureilham (9)
12.	FC Maurin (12)	4–3	FC Pradéen (11)
13.	FC Sauvian (10)	2–1	RC Montpellier Cévennes (10)
14.	ROC Social Sète (12)	2–0	AS La Grande-Motte (10)
15.	ASPTT Montpellier (11)	1–2	AS Mireval (10)
16.	CE Palavas (9)	5–1	US Villeveyrac (10)
17.	AS Saint-Mathieu-de-Tréviers (12)	2–3	US Villeneuvoise (10)
18.	Arsenal Croix d'Argent (10)	0–0 (2–4 p)	RC Ganges (11)
19.	RSO Cournonterral (11)	3–3 (1–4 p)	AS Puimissoniase (11)
20.	Entente Corneilhan-Lignan (10)	1–5	FC Villeneuve-lès-Béziers (10)
21.	FC Vailhauques (12)	0–4	Olympique La Peyrade FC (9)
22.	AS Celleneuve (10)	1–0	FC Lespignan-Vendres (9)
23.	Crabe Sportif Marseillan (13)	1–3	Ensérune FC (11)

These matches are from the Hautes-Pyrénées district, and were played on 23 and 24 August 2025.

First Round Results: Occitanie (Hautes-Pyrénées)
Tie no	Home team (Tier)	Score	Away team (Tier)
1.	ASC Aureilhan (9)	5–1	FC Bazillac (9)
2.	Tarbes FC (9)	2–1	US Côteaux (10)
3.	Boutons d'Or Ger (9)	3–0	FC Plateau-Lannezman (9)
4.	FC des Nestes (9)	3–1 (Note: Tie reversed from original draw.)	FC Bordes (11)
5.	ASC Barbazan-Debat (9)	3–3 (2–3 p)	US Marquisat Bénac (9)
6.	FC Val d'Adour (9)	0–3 (Note: Tie won by means of forfeit.)	Horgues-Odos FC (10)
7.	US Tarbais Nouvelle Vague (10)	0–0 (3–2 p)	Quand Même Orleix (9)

These matches are from the Lot district, and were played on 23 and 24 August 2025.

First Round Results: Occitanie (Lot)
Tie no	Home team (Tier)	Score	Away team (Tier)
1.	FC Gréalou (10)	1–4	Bouriane FC (10)
2.	Entente Fons Fourmagnac Camburat (11)	3–0	US Puybrun Tauriac (10)
3.	Entente Cazals Montcléra (9)	1–0	US3C Catus (9)
4.	Entente Cajarc Cenevières (10)	3–2	FC Lalbenque-Fontanes (9)
5.	Puy-l'Évêque-Prayssac FC (9)	5–4	FC Causse Sud 46 (9)
6.	Lacapelle Football (10)	2–3	AS Montcabrier (10)
7.	Entente Mayrinhac Saint-Céré (10)	3–6	Haut Célé FC (9)
8.	AS Saint-Matré Le Boulvé (12)	0–5	Causse Limargue FC (9)
9.	US Béduer-Faycelles (12)	1–3	Pradines-Saint-Vincent-Douelle-Mercuès Olt (10)
10.	US Payrignac (12)	0–5	AS Livernon (10)
11.	Entente Ségala Foot (9)	3–2	FF Mauroux (10)
12.	US Saint-Pauloise (11)	1–3	Entente Souillac-La Chapelle-Gignac (9)

These matches are from the Lozère district, and were played on 22 and 24 August 2025.

First Round Results: Occitanie (Lozère)
Tie no	Home team (Tier)	Score	Away team (Tier)
1.	Valdonnez FC (13)	2–2 (4–5 p)	AS Randonnaise (12)
2.	Olympique Mont-Aigoual (11)	0–6	AS Badaroux (11)
3.	AS Le Malzieu (11)	1–3	AS Chanac (11)

These matches are from the Pyrénées-Orientales district, and were played on 24 August 2025.

First Round Results: Occitanie (Pyrénées-Orientales)
Tie no	Home team (Tier)	Score	Away team (Tier)
1.	Le Boulou Saint-Jean FC (9)	1–1 (3–4 p)	BECE FC Vallée de l'Aigly (9)
2.	FC Villelongue (10)	1–1 (5–3 p)	Bages Villeneuve Raho FC (10)
3.	Olympique Port-Vendrais (12)	1–1 (4–5 p)	FC Saint-Cyprien (9)
4.	Cabestany OC (9)	11–0	AS Prades (9)
5.	Perpginan AC (12)	3–1	Association Théza Alénya Corneilla Olympique Catalan (11)
6.	Baho-Pézilla FC (10)	2–1	Roussillon Football Canohès Toulouges (10)
7.	FC Thuirinois (9)	1–0	FC Le Soler (9)

These matches are from the Tarn district, and were played on 23 and 24 August 2025.

First Round Results: Occitanie (Tarn)
Tie no	Home team (Tier)	Score	Away team (Tier)
1.	AF Pays d'Oc 81 (11)	0–6	AS Pampelonnaise (9)
2.	US Labruguièroise (10)	5–3	Réalmont FC (9)
3.	Sport Benfica Graulhet (10)	1–1 (4–3 p)	FC Pigné (11)
4.	US Cadalen (11)	4–1	AS Le Masnau-Massuguiès (12)
5.	Campagoût FC (10)	6–0	ACS Labrespy (11)
6.	AS Briatexte (10)	1–3	AS Vallée du Sor (10)
7.	US Autan (11)	0–0 (6–5 p)	Roquecourbe FC (9)
8.	US Aiguefonde (11)	0–2	US Gaillacois (9)
9.	Thoré FC 81 (12)	3–2	Les Copains d'Abord (10)
10.	AS Pays Gaillacois Lagrave (9)	2–0	Sporting Castres (10)
11.	Olympique Lautrec (10)	2–1	FC Brassac (10)
12.	US Cordes Valver (10)	2–2 (2–4 p)	US Carmaux (9)
13.	AS Albigeoise (11)	0–3	AS Payrin-Rigautou (9)

These matches are from the Tarn-et-Garonne district, and were played on 22, 23 and 24 August 2025.

First Round Results: Occitanie (Tarn-et-Garonne)
Tie no	Home team (Tier)	Score	Away team (Tier)
1.	Coquelicots Montéchois FC (10)	1–1 (5–2 p)	FCUS Molières (10)
2.	FC Albias (10)	0–2	AC Bastidien (9)
3.	Avenir Magistérien Football (10)	0–5	FC Lomagne 82 (9)
4.	JS Meauzacaise (9)	1–1 (4–5 p) (Note: JE Montalbanais penalised for fielding a suspended player, JS Meauzacaise qualified.)	JE Montalbanais (9)
5.	Entente Montbeton-Lacourt (10)	0–4 (Note: Tie reversed from original draw.)	SC Lafrançaise (9)
6.	Stade Caussadais (9)	2–6 (Note: Saint-Nauphary AC penalised for fielding a suspended player, Stade Caussadais qualified.)	Saint-Nauphary AC (9)
7.	Étoile Sud 82 (10)	0–1	US Malause (9)
8.	Corbarieu AC (9)	2–1	FC Brulhois (9)
9.	US Montbartier (9)	4–4 (1–4 p)	AS Stéphanoise (10)

=== Second round ===
These matches are from the Aude district, and were played on 30 and 31 August 2025.

Second Round Results: Occitanie (Aude)
Tie no	Home team (Tier)	Score	Away team (Tier)
1.	FC Caux-et-Sauzens (11)	4–3	ES Fanjeaux (10)
2.	FC Alzonne (8)	2–1	FC Corbières Méditerranée (8)
3.	Olympic Cuxac-d'Aude (9)	1–1 (6–7 p)	FU Narbonne (6)
4.	Entente Naurouze-Labastide (8)	7–1	AS Bram (9)
5.	USA Pezens (9)	3–4	Trèbes FC (7)
6.	FC Cazilhac (9)	2–0	Corbières FC (10)
7.	FC Alaric (11)	4–2	US Minervois (9)
8.	AS Espéraza (10)	2–3	Limoux FC (10)
9.	US Conques (7)	4–1	UF Lézignanais (8)
10.	ES Arzens (11)	3–2	ASC Mahoraise Carcassonne (11)
11.	FC Saint-Nazairois (9)	1–2	Leucate FC (10)
12.	CO Castelnaudary (7)	1–1 (2–4 p)	FA Carcassonne (7)

These matches are from the Ariège district, and were played on 30 and 31 August 2025.

Second Round Results: Occitanie (Ariège)
Tie no	Home team (Tier)	Score	Away team (Tier)
1.	FC Laroque d'Olmes (9)	7–0	EF Saint-Paul avec Mercus (9)
2.	EN Mazères (9)	2–0	ES Saint-Jean-du-Falga (9)
3.	Luzenac AP (7)	1–2	ES Fossatoise (8)
4.	FC Vernetois (11)	2–3	AS Rieux-de-Pelleport (9)
5.	FC Mirepoix 09 (9)	0–0 (7–8 p)	FC Saverdun (8)
6.	FC Pamiers (7)	3–0	FC Saint-Girons (8)

These matches are from the Aveyron district, and were played on 30 and 31 August 2025.

Second Round Results: Occitanie (Aveyron)
Tie no	Home team (Tier)	Score	Away team (Tier)
1.	Ségala-Rieupeyroux-Salvetat (10)	0–2	Ouest Aveyron Football (8)
2.	US Réquistanaise (9)	5–1	Méridienne d'Olt FC (10)
3.	AS Olemps (8)	1–4	FC Comtal (7)
4.	Association Saint-Laurentaise Cantonale Canourguaise (10)	1–2	Stade Saint-Affricain (8)
5.	Entente Villecomtal-Mouret-Pruines-Entraygues (10)	0–2	Druelle FC (8)
6.	Espoir FC 88 (8)	3–0	US Montbazens Rignac (8)
7.	Foot Vallon (9)	3–2	US Bas Rouergue (9)
8.	Inter du Causse Bezonnes (11)	2–5	JS Lévézou (9)
9.	US Larzac Vallées (11)	0–7	AS Aguessac (9)
10.	FC Naucellois (10)	4–3	JS Bassin Aveyron (9)
11.	ÉS Combes (10)	1–3	SO Millau (8)
12.	Luc Primaube FC (8)	3–3 (1–4 p)	US Espalion (9)
13.	Stade Villefranchois (11)	0–3	FC Monastère (8)
14.	FC Sources de l'Aveyron (8)	8–2	FC Saint-Georges-de-Luzençon (8)

These matches are from the Gard district, and were played on 30 and 31 August 2025.

Second Round Results: Occitanie (Gard)
Tie no	Home team (Tier)	Score	Away team (Tier)
1.	FC Bagnols Pont (8)	1–3	US Salinières Aigues Mortes (6)
2.	ES Barjac (9)	2–2 (4–2 p)	GC Uchaud (8)
3.	FC Chusclan-Laudun-l'Ardoise (8)	2–2 (5–6 p)	JS Chemin Bas d'Avignon (7)
4.	CO Soleil Levant Nîmes (10)	2–0	SC Saint-Martin-de-Valgalgues (10)
5.	JSO Aubord (12)	0–4	Entente Perrier Vergèze (8)
6.	AEC Saint-Gilles (8)	0–3 (Note: Tie won by means of forfeit.)	AS Rousson (6)
7.	FC Vatan (10)	1–0	AS Saint-Privat-des-Vieux (8)
8.	RC Saint-Laurent-des-Arbres (12)	0–4	FC Moussac (8)
9.	CA Bessegeoise (9)	4–2	SO Aimargues (7)
10.	FC Langlade (10)	2–0	US Monoblet (9)
11.	EF Vézénobres Cruviers (10)	0–2	SC Anduzien (8)
12.	All Five Académie (10)	0–8	FC Vauverdois (6)
13.	US Pujaut (11)	0–5	ES Grau-du-Roi (6)
14.	ES Suménoise (9)	2–3	OC Redessan (9)
15.	AC Pissevin Valdegour (9)	3–2	ES Pays d'Uzes (7)
16.	Pays Viganais Aigoual FC (10)	1–1 (3–5 p)	OC Bellegarde (11)
17.	Omnisports Saint-Hilaire-La Jasse (10)	1–4	ES Marguerittes (8)

These matches are from the Gers district, and were played on 29, 30 and 31 August 2025.

Second Round Results: Occitanie (Gers)
Tie no	Home team (Tier)	Score	Away team (Tier)
1.	AS Manciet (11)	0–4	ES Gimontoise (9)
2.	Lombez OFC (10)	1–2	Sainte-Christie-Preignan AS (8)
3.	US Aubiet (9)	0–2	FC Pavien (8)
4.	AS Ségoufielle Pujaudran Occitanie (9)	3–4	Cologne FC (9)
5.	Mauvezin FC (9)	2–3	FC L'Isle-Jourdain (8)
6.	AS Fleurance-La Sauvetat (8)	2–3	Auch Football (7)
7.	AS Monferran-Savès (10)	0–3	US Aignanais (7)

These matches are from the Haute-Garonne district, and were played on 29, 30 and 31 August 2025.

Second Round Results: Occitanie (Haute-Garonne)
Tie no	Home team (Tier)	Score	Away team (Tier)
1.	US Pouvourville (8)	2–1	AO Cornebarrieu (7)
2.	Toulouse Nord FC (11)	3–4	FC Bagatelle (9)
3.	Saint-Lys Olympique FC (9)	1–4	Juventus de Papus (7)
4.	Labège FC (10)	4–2	US Sainte-Foy Football (11)
5.	AC Garona (9)	1–1 (5–4 p)	Cap Jeunes 31 (10)
6.	JS Carbonne (8)	1–2	AS Portet-Carrefour-Récébédou (8)
7.	EFC Aurignac (9)	2–2 (3–1 p)	Confluent Lacroix/Saubens/Pinsaguel (10)
8.	EFC de la Vallée (8)	2–1	US Salies-du-Salat/Mane/Saint-Martory (7)
9.	AS Tournefeuille (8)	2–1	AS Toulouse Mirail (8)
10.	AS Castelnau-d'Estrétefonds (9)	0–3	Avenir Fonsorbais (6)
11.	Toulouse Football Compans Caffarelli (9)	3–0	US Cazères (8)
12.	FC Bessières-Buzet (13)	2–6	JS Cintegabelle (8)
13.	AS Toulouse Lardenne (10)	3–3 (9–8 p)	Saint-Orens FC (8)
14.	AS Hersoise (11)	0–3	AS Muret (6)
15.	Football Algérien Toulousain (10)	1–5	Olympique Girou FC (7)
16.	ES Saint-Simon (9)	1–4	Balma SC (6)
17.	RC Muret (11)	2–0	Entente des 3M (11)
18.	FC Mahorais Toulouse (11)	3–2	FC Launaguet (8)
19.	Gardouch OC (12)	1–3	US Plaisance-du-Touch (8)
20.	JS Cugnaux (7)	1–0 (Note: JS Cugnaux penalised for fielding an ineligible player, Toulouse Rodéo FC qualified.)	Toulouse Rodéo FC (6)
21.	US Bagnères-de-Luchon Sports-Cierp-Gaud-Marignac (10)	0–2	Comminges Saint-Gaudens (7)
22.	Union Saint-Jean FC (6)	3–0	Toulouse Métropole FC (6)
23.	US Encausse-Soueich-Ganties (10)	2–5	Baziège OC (7)
24.	UA Fenouillet (7)	2–2 (3–4 p)	JE Toulousaine Croix-Daurade (7)
25.	FC MAS 31 (8)	2–1	AS Lavernose-Lherm-Mauzac (8)
26.	US Riveraine (11)	1–2	Saint-Alban Aucamville FC (7)
27.	Pyrénées Sud Comminges (9)	2–2 (2–4 p)	ERCSO L'Isle-en-Dodon (7)
28.	US Léguevin (7)	4–1	Entente Boulogne-Péguilhan (7)
29.	US Bouloc Saint-Sauveur (9)	0–1	JS Toulouse Pradettes (8)
30.	US Toulouse (12)	0–12	US Pibrac (7)
31.	FC Oô Larboust (12)	0–5	JS Auzielle Lauzerville (10)
32.	Toulouse ACF (10)	1–3	US Revel (6)
33.	Lauragais FC (10)	0–0 (5–4 p)	Bruguières SC (11)
34.	ES Le Fousseret-Mondavezan (10)	0–6	US Seysses-Frouzins (7)

These matches are from the Hérault district, and were played on 30 and 31 August 2025.

Second Round Results: Occitanie (Hérault)
Tie no	Home team (Tier)	Score	Away team (Tier)
1.	FC Boujan (12)	0–1	CE Palavas (9)
2.	AS Puimissoniase (11)	2–3	ES Cazouls-Maraussan-Maureilham (9)
3.	RC Ganges (11)	0–3	Olympique Saint-André-de-Sangonis (7)
4.	AS Méditerrannée 34 (7)	4–2	FC Petit Bard (7)
5.	ES Gignac Vallée de l'Hérault (9)	2–2 (4–1 p)	FC Sussargues-Berange (9)
6.	AS Lattes (7)	3–2	AS Canet (8)
7.	AC Alignanais (10)	2–5	FC Sauvian (10)
8.	AS Bessanaise (11)	0–6	Mèze Stade FC (8)
9.	Baillargues-Saint-Brès-Valergues (8)	1–2	ES Pérols (8)
10.	FC Lavérune (10)	1–1 (4–5 p)	AS Valerguoise (11)
11.	AS Mireval (10)	1–5	ÉS Paulhan (7)
12.	ROC Social Sète (12)	0–15	AS Atlas Paillade (6)
13.	Arceaux Montpellier (9)	0–5 (Note: Castelnau Le Crès FC penalised for fielding too many transferred players, Arceaux Montpellier qualified.)	Castelnau Le Crès FC (7)
14.	US Villeneuvoise (10)	1–8	Entente Saint-Clément-Montferrier (6)
15.	Pointe Courte AC Sète (10)	1–1 (3–0 p)	FC Villeneuve-lès-Béziers (10)
16.	AS Croix d'Argent (12)	1–7	SC Sète (7)
17.	US Lunel Viellloise (12)	2–0 (Note: US Lunel Viellloise penalised for fielding an ineligible player, AS Celleneuve qualified.)	AS Celleneuve (10)
18.	Ensérune FC (11)	2–12	FO Sud Hérault (8)
19.	Olympique La Peyrade FC (9)	1–1 (4–3 p)	SC Saint-Thibérien (9)
20.	US Mauguio Carnon (8)	2–1	AS Béziers (6)
21.	AS Pignan (7)	0–3	AS Frontignan AC (6)
22.	AS Fabrègues (6)	2–2 (4–3 p)	La Clermontaise Football (6)
23.	AS Puissalicon-Magalas (8)	1–5	GC Lunel (6)
24.	PI Vendargues (7)	0–0 (8–7 p)	Jacou Clapiers FA (8)
25.	Avenir Castriote (11)	5–3	FC Maurin (12)
26.	Stade Balarucois (7)	3–0 (Note: Tie won by means of forfeit.)	RC Vedasien (7)

These matches are from the Hautes-Pyrénées district, and were played on 30 and 31 August 2025.

Second Round Results: Occitanie (Hautes-Pyrénées)
Tie no	Home team (Tier)	Score	Away team (Tier)
1.	Soues Cigognes FC (7)	0–2	FC Pyrénées/Vallées des Gaves (8)
2.	US Marquisat Bénac (9)	0–1	Elan Pyrénéen Bazet-Bordères-Lagarde (8)
3.	ES Haut Adour (8)	4–1	Boutons d'Or Ger (9)
4.	Horgues-Odos FC (10)	2–2 (4–2 p)	Séméac OFC (8)
5.	FC des Nestes (9)	1–2	Juillan OS (8)
6.	ASC Aureilhan (9)	0–2	FC Lourdais XI (6)
7.	Tarbes FC (9)	2–1	US Tarbais Nouvelle Vague (10)

These matches are from the Lot district, and were played on 29, 30 and 31 August 2025.

Second Round Results: Occitanie (Lot)
Tie no	Home team (Tier)	Score	Away team (Tier)
1.	Élan Marivalois (8)	5–0	FC Haut Quercy (9)
2.	Entente Fons Fourmagnac Camburat (11)	0–4	Entente Souillac-La Chapelle-Gignac (9)
3.	AS Montcabrier (10)	2–3	Figeac Capdenac Quercy FC (7)
4.	Haut Célé FC (9)	3–0	AS Livernon (10)
5.	Entente Cazals Montcléra (9)	1–10	Cahors FC (7)
6.	Pradines-Saint-Vincent-Douelle-Mercuès Olt (10)	7–0	Entente Cajarc Cenevières (10)
7.	Bouriane FC (10)	5–0	Entente Ségala Foot (9)
8.	Val Roc Foot (9)	2–1	Puy-l'Évêque-Prayssac FC (9)
9.	Causse Limargue FC (9)	1–4	AF Biars-Bretenoux (6)

These matches are from the Lozère district, and were played on 31 August 2025.

Second Round Results: Occitanie (Lozère)
Tie no	Home team (Tier)	Score	Away team (Tier)
1.	ESC Le Buisson (8)	1–2	AF Lozère (6)
2.	AS Badaroux (11)	9–1	AS Randonnaise (12)
3.	Marvejols Sports (10)	2–6	AS Chastelloise (11)
4.	AS Chanac (11)	1–0	ES Chirac-Le Monastier (11)

These matches are from the Pyrénées-Orientales district, and were played on 30 and 31 August 2025.

Second Round Results: Occitanie (Pyrénées-Orientales)
Tie no	Home team (Tier)	Score	Away team (Tier)
1.	OC Perpignan (9)	2–3	Sporting Perpignan Nord (8)
2.	Baho-Pézilla FC (10)	1–6	Racing Perpignan Méditerranée (9)
3.	Perpginan AC (12)	1–8	FC Claira/Saint-Laurent (8)
4.	FC Thuirinois (9)	0–0 (3–4 p)	FC Saint-Cyprien (9)
5.	FC Villelongue (10)	0–2	Elne FC (8)
6.	Saleilles OC (10)	0–3	SO Rivesaltais (8)
7.	Cabestany OC (9)	2–0	BECE FC Vallée de l'Aigly (9)

These matches are from the Tarn district, and were played on 30 and 31 August 2025.

Second Round Results: Occitanie (Tarn)
Tie no	Home team (Tier)	Score	Away team (Tier)
1.	Campagoût FC (10)	2–4	US Saint-Sulpice (7)
2.	AS Giroussens (8)	1–2	Union Graulhetoise (8)
3.	US Carmaux (9)	0–4	Albi Marssac Tarn Football ASPTT (6)
4.	US Gaillacois (9)	4–1	AS Vallée du Sor (10)
5.	AS Pampelonnaise (9)	4–0	AS Pays Gaillacois Lagrave (9)
6.	US Cadalen (11)	2–3	Thoré FC 81 (12)
7.	US Castres (8)	0–1	Lavaur FC (7)
8.	US Labruguièroise (10)	2–2 (5–3 p)	FC Vignoble 81 (8)
9.	Olympique Lautrec (10)	4–1	US Autan (11)
10.	AS Payrin-Rigautou (9)	2–2 (6–5 p)	US Albi (8)
11.	La Cremade FC (8)	1–2	FC Pays Mazamétain (7)
12.	Sport Benfica Graulhet (10)	0–2	Saint-Juéry OF (7)

These matches are from the Tarn-et-Garonne district, and were played on 29, 30 and 31 August 2025.

Second Round Results: Occitanie (Tarn-et-Garonne)
Tie no	Home team (Tier)	Score	Away team (Tier)
1.	FC Nègrepelisse-Montricoux (8)	0–6	Montauban FCTG (6)
2.	AC Bastidien (9)	0–2	La Nicolaite (8)
3.	AS Stéphanoise (10)	0–0 (4–5 p)	FC 2 Rives 82 (6)
4.	Confluences FC (8)	7–0	JS Meauzacaise (9)
5.	Corbarieu AC (9)	2–2 (4–1 p)	Coquelicots Montéchois FC (10)
6.	Cazes Olympique (8)	3–1	AS Bressols (7)
7.	SC Lafrançaise (9)	4–1	Stade Caussadais (9)
8.	FC Lomagne 82 (9)	2–0	AA Grisolles (7)
9.	US Malause (9)	0–0 (3–2 p)	FC Garonne Gascogne (7)

=== Third round ===
These matches were played on 12, 13 and 14 September 2025.

Third Round Results: Occitanie
Tie no	Home team (Tier)	Score	Away team (Tier)
1.	AS Rousson (6)	2–2 (6–7 p) (Note: Tie reversed from original draw.)	Olympique Alès (5)
2.	Arceaux Montpellier (9)	1–2	ES Barjac (9)
3.	FC Langlade (10)	1–1 (1–4 p)	PI Vendargues (7)
4.	Mèze Stade FC (8)	1–2	CE Palavas (9)
5.	AC Pissevin Valdegour (9)	0–2	FC Vauverdois (6)
6.	OC Bellegarde (11)	3–2	CA Bessegeoise (9)
7.	SC Anduzien (8)	3–1	JS Chemin Bas d'Avignon (7)
8.	OC Redessan (9)	6–0	FC Vatan (10)
9.	US Salinières Aigues Mortes (6)	0–2	Stade Beaucairois FC (5)
10.	Entente Perrier Vergèze (8)	1–4	Olympique Saint-André-de-Sangonis (7)
11.	ES Pérols (8)	1–2	ES Grau-du-Roi (6)
12.	ES Marguerittes (8)	0–4	US Mauguio Carnon (8)
13.	FC Moussac (8)	1–1 (8–7 p)	AS Lattes (7)
14.	AS Celleneuve (10)	2–2 (2–3 p)	CO Soleil Levant Nîmes (10)
15.	FC Alzonne (8)	1–1 (5–6 p)	Olympique La Peyrade FC (9)
16.	Elne FC (8)	1–1 (3–4 p)	Cabestany OC (9)
17.	Pointe Courte AC Sète (10)	3–4	US Conques (7)
18.	AS Valerguoise (11)	2–3	Stade Balarucois (7)
19.	Racing Perpignan Méditerranée (9)	0–3	AS Atlas Paillade (6)
20.	Avenir Castriote (11)	2–1	FC Cazilhac (9)
21.	Sporting Perpignan Nord (8)	1–1 (6–7 p)	Entente Saint-Clément-Montferrier (6)
22.	GC Lunel (6)	0–0 (3–4 p)	RCO Agde (5)
23.	ES Gignac Vallée de l'Hérault (9)	0–1	ÉS Paulhan (7)
24.	FC Saint-Cyprien (9)	0–4	Trèbes FC (7)
25.	FO Sud Hérault (8)	1–0	ES Cazouls-Maraussan-Maureilham (9)
26.	SO Rivesaltais (8)	0–2	Entente Naurouze-Labastide (8)
27.	FC Sauvian (10)	3–2	FC Claira/Saint-Laurent (8)
28.	Leucate FC (10)	2–2 (3–4 p)	AS Méditerrannée 34 (7)
29.	SC Sète (7)	2–0	AS Fabrègues (6)
30.	ES Arzens (11)	0–7	AS Portet-Carrefour-Récébédou (8)
31.	JS Toulouse Pradettes (8)	1–0	AS Rieux-de-Pelleport (9)
32.	AC Garona (9)	1–1 (5–6 p)	FC Pays Mazamétain (7)
33.	US Plaisance-du-Touch (8)	1–3	AS Frontignan AC (6)
34.	FC Laroque d'Olmes (9)	3–5	FC Pamiers (7)
35.	FC Caux-et-Sauzens (11)	1–1 (2–4 p)	Baziège OC (7)
36.	JS Cintegabelle (8)	2–0	AS Payrin-Rigautou (9)
37.	ES Fossatoise (8)	2–1	EN Mazères (9)
38.	FC Alaric (11)	0–1	Juventus de Papus (7)
39.	US Revel (6)	0–3	FU Narbonne (6)
40.	JE Toulousaine Croix-Daurade (7)	2–1	US Pouvourville (8)
41.	Limoux FC (10)	0–6	FC Alberes Argelès (5)
42.	Thoré FC 81 (12)	0–9	Canet Roussillon FC (5)
43.	FA Carcassonne (7)	3–3 (2–3 p)	FC Saverdun (8)
44.	AS Toulouse Lardenne (10)	1–2	Cazes Olympique (8)
45.	Corbarieu AC (9)	2–0	Confluences FC (8)
46.	Olympique Girou FC (7)	0–2	FC 2 Rives 82 (6)
47.	Figeac Capdenac Quercy FC (7)	1–2	Saint-Alban Aucamville FC (7)
48.	Élan Marivalois (8)	0–1	AF Biars-Bretenoux (6)
49.	Entente Souillac-La Chapelle-Gignac (9)	1–3	La Nicolaite (8)
50.	Cahors FC (7)	5–1	Ouest Aveyron Football (8)
51.	US Malause (9)	0–5	US Colomiers Football (5)
52.	SC Lafrançaise (9)	0–5	Blagnac FC (5)
53.	FC Naucellois (10)	2–3	US Pibrac (7)
54.	AS Tournefeuille (8)	2–2 (5–4 p)	Montauban FCTG (6)
55.	Bouriane FC (10)	0–2	Haut Célé FC (9)
56.	FC Bagatelle (9)	10–1	Pradines-Saint-Vincent-Douelle-Mercuès Olt (10)
57.	FC MAS 31 (8)	4–0	Val Roc Foot (9)
58.	FC Mahorais Toulouse (11)	1–0	FC Lomagne 82 (9)
59.	EFC de la Vallée (8)	1–2	Espoir FC 88 (8)
60.	Union Graulhetoise (8)	3–2	FC Sources de l'Aveyron (8)
61.	Druelle FC (8)	1–0	US Gaillacois (9)
62.	SO Millau (8)	0–3	Saint-Juéry OF (7)
63.	AS Chastelloise (11)	3–2	US Labruguièroise (10)
64.	AS Pampelonnaise (9)	1–1 (4–5 p)	FC Comtal (7)
65.	Foot Vallon (9)	0–4	Union Saint-Jean FC (6)
66.	AS Aguessac (9)	0–3	Onet-le-Château Football (5)
67.	Stade Saint-Affricain (8)	2–7	AF Lozère (6)
68.	AS Chanac (11)	1–0	US Espalion (9)
69.	US Réquistanaise (9)	0–6	Lavaur FC (7)
70.	Olympique Lautrec (10)	2–1	Toulouse Rodéo FC (6)
71.	AS Badaroux (11)	2–1	FC Monastère (8)
72.	Balma SC (6)	2–0	Albi Marssac Tarn Football ASPTT (6)
73.	JS Lévézou (9)	3–5	US Saint-Sulpice (7)
74.	Cologne FC (9)	0–3	Avenir Fonsorbais (6)
75.	ERCSO L'Isle-en-Dodon (7)	2–2 (8–7 p)	Elan Pyrénéen Bazet-Bordères-Lagarde (8)
76.	Sainte-Christie-Preignan AS (8)	4–1	FC Lourdais XI (6)
77.	FC Pavien (8)	0–3	AS Muret (6)
78.	FC L'Isle-Jourdain (8)	1–1 (5–4 p)	Toulouse Football Compans Caffarelli (9)
79.	Comminges Saint-Gaudens (7)	0–1	US Castanéenne (5)
80.	EFC Aurignac (9)	0–8	Auch Football (7)
81.	ES Gimontoise (9)	0–1	Tarbes Pyrénées Football (5)
82.	Lauragais FC (10)	2–1	Horgues-Odos FC (10)
83.	RC Muret (11)	0–6	US Aignanais (7)
84.	US Léguevin (7)	2–1	ES Haut Adour (8)
85.	Juillan OS (8)	2–2 (5–4 p)	FC Pyrénées/Vallées des Gaves (8)
86.	JS Auzielle Lauzerville (10)	2–3	Tarbes FC (9)
87.	Labège FC (10)	0–3	US Seysses-Frouzins (7)

=== Fourth round ===
These matches were played on 27 and 28 September 2025.

Fourth Round Results: Occitanie
Tie no	Home team (Tier)	Score	Away team (Tier)
1.	ES Barjac (9)	1–2	SC Anduzien (8)
2.	ES Grau-du-Roi (6)	2–0	AS Méditerrannée 34 (7)
3.	Olympique Saint-André-de-Sangonis (7)	2–1	SC Sète (7)
4.	Entente Naurouze-Labastide (8)	2–0	OC Redessan (9)
5.	Nîmes Olympique (4)	0–2 (Note: Tie reversed from original draw.)	Stade Beaucairois FC (5)
6.	PI Vendargues (7)	0–0 (5–4 p)	FO Sud Hérault (8)
7.	AS Badaroux (11)	0–2	FC Moussac (8)
8.	CO Soleil Levant Nîmes (10)	3–8	ÉS Paulhan (7)
9.	US Mauguio Carnon (8)	1–1 (5–3 p)	CE Palavas (9)
10.	FC Vauverdois (6)	3–1	Stade Balarucois (7)
11.	Olympique Alès (5)	1–3	Entente Saint-Clément-Montferrier (6)
12.	FU Narbonne (6)	2–1	FC Pays Mazamétain (7)
13.	OC Bellegarde (11)	4–4 (4–3 p)	US Conques (7)
14.	Olympique La Peyrade FC (9)	2–0	JS Cintegabelle (8)
15.	FC Sauvian (10)	0–1	Baziège OC (7)
16.	Avenir Castriote (11)	2–0	ES Fossatoise (8)
17.	FC Pamiers (7)	0–5	RCO Agde (5)
18.	Cabestany OC (9)	2–2 (3–1 p) (Note: Cabestany OC penalised for fielding too many trasnferred players, Juventus de Papus qualified.)	Juventus de Papus (7)
19.	AS Atlas Paillade (6)	4–1	JE Toulousaine Croix-Daurade (7)
20.	AS Frontignan AC (6)	0–0 (6–5 p)	FC Alberes Argelès (5)
21.	FC Saverdun (8)	2–3	JS Toulouse Pradettes (8)
22.	Trèbes FC (7)	1–3	Canet Roussillon FC (5)
23.	Corbarieu AC (9)	0–2	Lavaur FC (7)
24.	Olympique Lautrec (10)	1–1 (2–4 p)	AF Biars-Bretenoux (6)
25.	La Nicolaite (8)	0–1 (Note: Union Graulhetoise penalised for fielding players with fraudulent medical certificates, La Nicolaite qualified.)	Union Graulhetoise (8)
26.	Druelle FC (8)	0–4	US Colomiers Football (5)
27.	AS Chastelloise (11)	2–4	Saint-Juéry OF (7)
28.	AS Chanac (11)	0–0 (4–5 p)	Espoir FC 88 (8)
29.	Cazes Olympique (8)	1–3	FC 2 Rives 82 (6)
30.	AF Lozère (6)	3–1	Cahors FC (7)
31.	Haut Célé FC (9)	2–3	Onet-le-Château Football (5)
32.	Saint-Alban Aucamville FC (7)	1–5	Blagnac FC (5)
33.	FC Comtal (7)	4–0	US Saint-Sulpice (7)
34.	Auch Football (7)	2–1	US Aignanais (7)
35.	US Seysses-Frouzins (7)	1–1 (16–15 p)	Balma SC (6)
36.	Lauragais FC (10)	1–1 (4–5 p)	FC MAS 31 (8)
37.	Juillan OS (8)	1–4	AS Muret (6)
38.	FC Mahorais Toulouse (11)	1–5	Union Saint-Jean FC (6)
39.	FC Bagatelle (9)	0–3	US Castanéenne (5)
40.	US Pibrac (7)	2–2 (3–1 p)	Sainte-Christie-Preignan AS (8)
41.	ERCSO L'Isle-en-Dodon (7)	2–1	FC L'Isle-Jourdain (8)
42.	AS Portet-Carrefour-Récébédou (8)	5–0	Tarbes FC (9)
43.	US Léguevin (7)	1–1 (4–3 p)	AS Tournefeuille (8)
44.	Tarbes Pyrénées Football (5)	0–0 (3–5 p)	Avenir Fonsorbais (6)

=== Fifth round ===
These matches were played on 11 and 12 October 2025.

Fifth Round Results: Occitanie
Tie no	Home team (Tier)	Score	Away team (Tier)
1.	Entente Saint-Clément-Montferrier (6)	7–1	Baziège OC (7)
2.	Lavaur FC (7)	1–1 (4–1 p)	Onet-le-Château Football (5)
3.	AS Portet-Carrefour-Récébédou (8)	0–8	US Colomiers Football (5)
4.	Entente Naurouze-Labastide (8)	1–3	Olympique La Peyrade FC (9)
5.	Blagnac FC (5)	1–0	AF Lozère (6)
6.	ÉS Paulhan (7)	5–1	FC Moussac (8)
7.	Avenir Castriote (11)	1–1 (5–4 p)	AS Frontignan AC (6)
8.	OC Bellegarde (11)	1–4	US Mauguio Carnon (8)
9.	Auch Football (7)	1–0	PI Vendargues (7)
10.	Canet Roussillon FC (5)	1–0	FU Narbonne (6)
11.	FC MAS 31 (8)	0–0 (4–5 p)	JS Toulouse Pradettes (8)
12.	Saint-Juéry OF (7)	1–2	Union Saint-Jean FC (6)
13.	AF Biars-Bretenoux (6)	5–3	Juventus de Papus (7)
14.	AS Muret (6)	1–3	ES Grau-du-Roi (6)
15.	SC Anduzien (8)	0–7	US Castanéenne (5)
16.	FC Comtal (7)	1–2	RCO Agde (5)
17.	La Nicolaite (8)	0–5	Stade Beaucairois FC (5)
18.	US Seysses-Frouzins (7)	2–0	ERCSO L'Isle-en-Dodon (7)
19.	Espoir FC 88 (8)	1–1 (2–4 p)	Avenir Fonsorbais (6)
20.	AS Atlas Paillade (6)	5–1	US Léguevin (7)
21.	FC 2 Rives 82 (6)	4–2	Olympique Saint-André-de-Sangonis (7)
22.	US Pibrac (7)	1–0	FC Vauverdois (6)

=== Sixth round ===
These matches were played on 25 and 26 October 2025.

Sixth Round Results: Occitanie
Tie no	Home team (Tier)	Score	Away team (Tier)
1.	Lavaur FC (7)	3–3 (3–4 p)	US Pibrac (7)
2.	JS Toulouse Pradettes (8)	0–3	RCO Agde (5)
3.	US Seysses-Frouzins (7)	1–1 (7–8 p)	Blagnac FC (5)
4.	AS Atlas Paillade (6)	8–0	ÉS Paulhan (7)
5.	ES Grau-du-Roi (6)	1–1 (4–5 p)	AF Biars-Bretenoux (6)
6.	Union Saint-Jean FC (6)	2–1	US Castanéenne (5)
7.	Olympique La Peyrade FC (9)	1–2	Auch Football (7)
8.	US Colomiers Football (5)	5–1	Entente Saint-Clément-Montferrier (6)
9.	Avenir Castriote (11)	0–3	FC 2 Rives 82 (6)
10.	Avenir Fonsorbais (6)	0–2	Canet Roussillon FC (5)
11.	US Mauguio Carnon (8)	0–0 (4–3 p)	Stade Beaucairois FC (5)
