= 2024–25 Coupe de France preliminary rounds, Occitanie =

The 2024–25 Coupe de France preliminary rounds, Occitanie was the qualifying competition to decide which teams from the leagues of the Occitanie region of France took part in the main competition from the seventh round.

A total of ten teams qualified from the Occitanie preliminary rounds.

In 2023–24, four teams from the region made it to the Round of 64. Championnat National side Nîmes Olympique lost at that stage to divisional rivals US Orléans. Championnat National 2 side Olympique Alès suffered a tight home defeat to Ligue 2 side Paris FC. Of the two Régional 1 sides that reached this stage, AS Fabrègues lost at home to Championnat National 2 side Trélissac-Antonne Périgord FC, whilst US Revel lost heavily to the eventual winners Paris Saint-Germain F.C..

== Draws and fixtures ==
In a document published on 1 July 2024, the league stated there were 527 entrants from the region. The league published the draw for the first two rounds on 23 July 2024, along with a revision of the total entries to 508, and the confirmed structure of the preliminary rounds. The first round consisted of 202 fixtures, with teams from Régional 1 and Régional 2 divisions exempt, along with the 14 teams from below this level with the best record in last years competition. The second round draw consisted of 146 ties, including those teams exempted from the first round

The third round draw was published on 3 September 2024, consisting of 78 ties, and seeing the ten teams from Championnat National 3 enter the competition. The fourth round draw was published on 17 September 2024. There were 39 ties drawn. The fifth round draw was published on 2 October 2024, with the entry of the single team from Championnat National to the competition, and 20 ties drawn. The sixth round draw, with 10 ties, was published on 17 October 2024.

=== First round ===
These matches are from the Ariège district, and were played on 24 and 25 August 2024.

First Round Results: Occitanie (Ariège)
| Tie no | Home team (Tier) | Score | Away team (Tier) |
|---|---|---|---|
| 1. | ES Fossatoise (8) | 12–0 | AS Rieux-de-Pelleport (9) |
| 2. | US Lescure (9) | 2–3 | ES Saint-Jean-du-Falga (9) |
| 3. | Escosse FC (10) | 0–5 | FC Pamiers (8) |
| 4. | EN Mazères (9) | 5–1 | FC Mirepoix 09 (8) |
| 5. | FC Vernetois (11) | 2–8 | FC Saverdun (8) |
| 6. | US Mas-d'Azil (11) | 0–2 | FC Laroque d'Olmes (9) |
| 7. | FC Foix (9) | 0–6 | FC Coussa-Hers (9) |
| 8. | EF Saint-Paul avec Mercus (10) | 0–3 | FC Saint-Girons (8) |
| 9. | Entente Varilhes-Saint-Jean-de-Verges (9) | 1–2 | AS Critourienne (9) |

These matches are from the Aude district, and were played on 24 and 25 August 2024.

First Round Results: Occitanie (Aude)
| Tie no | Home team (Tier) | Score | Away team (Tier) |
|---|---|---|---|
| 1. | US Montagne Noir (10) | 6–4 | MJC Gruissan (9) |
| 2. | FC Alaric (12) | 1–1 (3–2 p) | UF Lézignanais (9) |
| 3. | Haut-Minervois Olympique (9) | 1–4 | FC Corbières Méditerranée (8) |
| 4. | ES Sainte-Eulalie-Villesèquelande (10) | 1–2 | FC Chalabre (10) |
| 5. | FC Quillan Haute Vallée (11) | 1–5 | FC Villedubert (10) |
| 6. | US Minervois (9) | 8–1 | Omnisport Saint-Papoul (10) |
| 7. | FC Saint-Nazairois (8) | 3–1 | Trapel FC (9) |
| 8. | AS Espéraza (10) | 0–3 | ES Fanjeaux (10) |
| 9. | Limoux FC (10) | 1–1 (4–2 p) | RC Pieusse (10) |
| 10. | Leucate FC (11) | 1–0 | Corbières FC (11) |
| 11. | Razès Olympique (9) | 1–5 | Entente Naurouze-Labastide (8) |
| 12. | AS Bram (10) | 4–2 | ASC des Îles (11) |
| 13. | FC Villegly (9) | 0–4 | Trèbes FC (8) |
| 14. | RC Badens Rustiques (11) | 0–6 | USA Pezens (9) |
| 15. | FC Alzonne (9) | 4–0 | FC Massogien (10) |

These matches are from the Aveyron district, and were played on 23, 24 and 25 August 2024, with one replayed on 28 August 2024.

First Round Results: Occitanie (Aveyron)
| Tie no | Home team (Tier) | Score | Away team (Tier) |
|---|---|---|---|
| 1. | Ouest Aveyron Football (8) | 4–1 | JS Lévézou (9) |
| 2. | FC Agen-Gages (10) | 1–3 (Note: Tie reversed from original draw.) | AS Moyrazès (10) |
| 3. | AS Vabraise (11) | 1–3 | US Larzac Vallées (11) |
| 4. | Pareloup Céor FC (10) | 2–2 (3–0 p) | FC Sources de l'Aveyron (8) |
| 5. | Entente Villecomtal-Mouret-Pruines-Entraygues (10) | 0–0 (4–3 p) | US Dourdou (10) |
| 6. | US Réquistanaise (8) | 0–1 | Espoir FC 88 (8) |
| 7. | US Pays Alzuréen (10) | 0–4 (Note: The original match on 24 August 2024 was abandoned after 45 minutes after the pitch became unplayable due to bad weather. The league instructed it to be replayed on 28 August 2024.) | Luc Primaube FC (8) |
| 8. | SO Millau (8) | 7–0 | AS Saint-Geniez-d'Olt (9) |
| 9. | JS Rance Rougier (10) | 0–3 | Foot Vallon (10) |
| 10. | Inter du Causse Bezonnes (11) | 0–3 | FC Saint-Georges-de-Luzençon (9) |
| 11. | AS Olemps (9) | 8–2 | US Argence/Viadène (10) |
| 12. | FC Monastère (8) | 4–0 | US Bas Rouergue (9) |
| 13. | US Penchot Livinhac (11) | 1–3 | US Espalion (9) |
| 14. | CO Campagnac Saint-Saturnin (13) | 0–3 (Note: Tie won by means of forfeit.) | Ségala-Rieupeyroux-Salvetat (9) |
| 15. | AS Soulages-Bonneval (11) | 1–6 | AS Aguessac (9) |
| 16. | FC Naucellois (9) | 3–2 | Méridienne d'Olt FC (10) |
| 17. | ÉS Combes (10) | 0–2 | JS Bassin Aveyron (8) |

These matches are from the Gard district, and were played on 25 August 2024.

First Round Results: Occitanie (Gard)
| Tie no | Home team (Tier) | Score | Away team (Tier) |
|---|---|---|---|
| 1. | AS Caissargues (10) | 2–5 | ES Marguerittes (8) |
| 2. | FC Moussac (9) | 2–0 | US Monoblet (8) |
| 3. | RC Générac (9) | 0–2 | EF Vézénobres Cruviers (10) |
| 4. | GC Quissac (11) | 3–3 (8–7 p) | ES Barjac (9) |
| 5. | FC Langlade (10) | 6–1 | AS Cendras (11) |
| 6. | Olympique Saintois (9) | 2–6 | FC Bagnols Escanaux (10) |
| 7. | AS Saint-Paulet-de-Caisson (11) | 3–2 | Omnisports Saint-Hilaire-La Jasse (11) |
| 8. | US Trèfle (9) | 0–3 (Note: Tie won by means of forfeit.) | All Five Académie (10) |
| 9. | SC Saint-Martin-de-Valgalgues (10) | 7–2 | RC Sauveterre (11) |
| 10. | FC Saint-Alexandre Olympique (12) | 0–3 | Calvisson FC (10) |
| 11. | US Garons (10) | 5–0 | JSO Aubord (11) |
| 12. | Entente Perrier Vergèze (8) | 1–2 | FC Val de Cèze (9) |
| 13. | RC Saint-Laurent-des-Arbres (11) | 2–1 | AS Saint-Christol-lès-Alès (10) |
| 14. | ES Théziers (10) | 4–3 | OC Bellegarde (11) |
| 15. | Pays Viganais Aigoual FC (10) | 1–1 (1–4 p) | CO Soleil Levant Nîmes (10) |
| 16. | Olympique Mas de Mingue (11) | 1–4 | FC Cabassut (9) |
| 17. | SA Cigalois (11) | 3–2 | AS Saint-Privat-des-Vieux (9) |
| 18. | FC Chusclan-Laudun-l'Ardoise (8) | 2–2 (3–5 p) | ES Suménoise (8) |
| 19. | AC Pissevin Valdegour (9) | 1–0 | AEC Saint-Gilles (8) |
| 20. | SC Brouzet-Lès-Alès (11) | 2–5 | Olympique Fourquésien (10) |
| 21. | FC Rodilhan (11) | 0–1 | GC Uchaud (8) |
| 22. | FC Milhaud (12) | 1–5 (Note: Match abandoned by the referee after 44 minutes, when FC Milhaud were reduced to fewer than 8 players through injury. FC Milhaud penalised, CA Bessegoise qualify.) | CA Bessegeoise (9) |
| 23. | SC Manduellois (12) | 0–3 | ES Rochefort Signargues (11) |
| 24. | Les Mages Saint-Ambroix Sedisud FC (11) | 0–4 | Stade Sainte-Barbe (9) |
| 25. | OC Redessan (10) | 2–4 | SC Anduzien (8) |

These matches are from the Haute-Garonne district, and were played on 23, 24 and 25 August 2024.

First Round Results: Occitanie (Haute-Garonne)
| Tie no | Home team (Tier) | Score | Away team (Tier) |
|---|---|---|---|
| 1. | AS Hersoise (11) | 2–3 | JS Carbonne (8) |
| 2. | Toulouse Football Compans Caffarelli (9) | 4–3 | US Encausse-Soueich-Ganties (10) |
| 3. | Nébouzan Olympique (12) | 0–3 | FC Canal Nord (11) |
| 4. | FC Saleichois (13) | 0–4 | AS Longages (10) |
| 5. | FC Labarthe-Rivière (11) | 0–2 | Saint-Lys Olympique FC (9) |
| 6. | Étoile Canton Saint-Martory (12) | 1–9 | Toulouse Olympique Aviation Club (9) |
| 7. | JS Cintegabelle (8) | 2–1 | Labège FC (9) |
| 8. | US Estadinoise (12) | 1–3 | AS Castelnau-d'Estrétefonds (9) |
| 9. | US Labastidette (13) | 0–4 | JS Auzielle Lauzerville (11) |
| 10. | Lagardelle Miremont Sports (10) | 1–3 | Pyrénées Sud Comminges (9) |
| 11. | US Bouloc Saint-Sauveur (10) | 5–1 | Entente Landorthe-Labarthe-Estancarbon-Savarthès (9) |
| 12. | Toulouse ACF (10) | 0–4 | AS Toulouse Mirail (8) |
| 13. | US Bérat (10) | 2–1 | AS Portet-Carrefour-Récébédou (8) |
| 14. | SC Valentine (11) | 2–0 (Note: Tie reversed from original draw.) | US Toulouse (13) |
| 15. | ES Franquevielle (12) | 1–9 | JS Brax (10) |
| 16. | Grenade FC (10) | 3–0 | AS Toulouse Lardenne (11) |
| 17. | RC Muret (11) | 3–1 | AS Villeneuve-Lécussan (12) |
| 18. | Gardouch OC (12) | 2–3 | FC Bagatelle (10) |
| 19. | Olympique Montespan-Figarol (12) | 1–8 | AC Garona (10) |
| 20. | FC Mahorais Toulouse (12) | 4–2 | Cap Jeunes 31 (11) |
| 21. | Confluent Lacroix/Saubens/Pinsaguel (11) | 0–1 | US Pouvourville (8) |
| 22. | FC Oô Larboust (13) | 1–4 | EFC Aurignac (9) |
| 23. | EJ Lapeyrouse/Saint-Genies/Saint-Loup (13) | 1–5 | Lauragais FC (11) |
| 24. | Toulouse Rangueil FC (9) | 2–1 | FC Launaguet (8) |
| 25. | FC Mabroc (11) | 0–3 (Note: Tie won by means of forfeit.) | ES Le Fousseret-Mondavezan (10) |
| 26. | Saint-Orens FC (8) | 2–0 | JS Toulouse Pradettes (8) |
| 27. | AO Cornebarrieu (8) | 2–3 | EFC de la Vallée (9) |
| 28. | Toulouse Football Sud (12) | 1–10 | UA Fenouillet (8) |
| 29. | Toulouse Cheminots Marengo Sports (12) | 3–0 | ESÉ Saint-Jory (12) |
| 30. | (Spain) UE Bossòst (11) | 0–3 | US Castelginest (9) |
| 31. | FC Bessières-Buzet (13) | 1–0 | US Bagnères-de-Luchon Sports-Cierp-Gaud-Marignac (10) |
| 32. | OFC Castres (12 (Note: OFC Castres are from the Tarn district.)) | 1–5 | Bruguières SC (11) |
| 33. | Entente des 3M (11) | 0–2 | ES Saint-Simon (9) |
| 34. | Football Algérien Toulousain (11) | 1–1 (6–5 p) | FC MAS 31 (8) |

These matches are from the Gers district, and were played on 23, 24 and 25 August 2024.

First Round Results: Occitanie (Gers)
| Tie no | Home team (Tier) | Score | Away team (Tier) |
|---|---|---|---|
| 1. | AS Ségoufielle (9) | 4–0 | Forza Labéjan-Saint-Jean-le-Comtal (10) |
| 2. | SC Saint-Clar (10) | 0–0 (3–4 p) | Sud Astarac 2010 (9) |
| 3. | Lombez OFC (10) | 1–3 | FC L'Isle-Jourdain (8) |
| 4. | Eauze FC (9) | 4–0 | AS Manciet (10) |
| 5. | SC Solomiac (11) | 0–5 | Sainte-Christie-Preignan AS (9) |
| 6. | Val d'Arros Adour (11) | 0–3 (Note: Tie won by means of forfeit.) | ES Gimontoise (8) |
| 7. | ES Cologne-Sarrant (9) | 1–1 (5–4 p) | Mauvezin FC (10) |
| 8. | US Aubiet (9) | 1–0 | AS Monferran-Savès (9) |
| 9. | AS Fleurance-La Sauvetat (8) | 1–1 (3–4 p) | US Aignanais (8) |
| 10. | UA Vic-Fezensac (9) | 9–0 | FC Mirandais (10) |

These matches are from the Hérault district, and were played on 24 and 25 August 2024.

First Round Results: Occitanie (Hérault)
| Tie no | Home team (Tier) | Score | Away team (Tier) |
|---|---|---|---|
| 1. | ES Nézignan (11) | 0–2 | AS Valerguoise (11) |
| 2. | FC Sussargues-Berange (9) | 4–0 | ES Cazouls-Maraussan-Maureilham (10) |
| 3. | Montpeyroux FC (10) | 1–2 | Avenir Castriote (11) |
| 4. | USO Florensac-Pinet (10) | 0–4 | US Basses Cévennes (11) |
| 5. | US Villeneuvoise (10) | 0–3 | Mèze Stade FC (8) |
| 6. | US Lunel Viellloise (12) | 0–3 | Arceaux Montpellier (10) |
| 7. | AS Puimissoniase (10) | 3–0 | ASPTT Montpellier (11) |
| 8. | FC Sauvian (11) | 4–1 | Ensérune FC (11) |
| 9. | AS Puissalicon-Magalas (8) | 4–5 | Stade Balarucois (8) |
| 10. | Arsenal Croix d'Argent (11) | 3–0 (Note: Tie won by means of forfeit.) | FCO Viassois (11) |
| 11. | ES Coeur Hérault (10) | 0–9 | US Mauguio Carnon (8) |
| 12. | ROC Social Sète (12) | 3–0 | ES Grand Orb (11) |
| 13. | FC Lavérune (10) | 1–2 | ES Pérols (8) |
| 14. | Entente Corneilhan-Lignan (10) | 4–1 | Pointe Courte AC Sète (10) |
| 15. | US Villeveyrac (10) | 1–2 | FO Sud Hérault (8) |
| 16. | US Montagnac (11) | 0–5 | Olympique La Peyrade FC (9) |
| 17. | FC Lamalou-les-Bains (11) | 1–6 | SC Saint-Thibérien (9) |
| 18. | AS Bessanaise (11) | 2–4 | Entente AS Gignac/US Puget (9) |
| 19. | FC Boujan (13) | 0–0 (6–5 p) | Olympique Maraussanais Biterrois (11) |
| 20. | FC Saint-Pargoire (11) | 4–3 | OF Thézan-Saint-Geniès (12) |
| 21. | US Saint-Martinoise (12) | 4–0 | FC Thongue et Libron (11) |
| 22. | Aurore Saint-Gilloise (10) | 1–2 | FC Domitia (10) |
| 23. | AS Mireval (10) | 1–1 (2–4 p) | FC Lespignan-Vendres (9) |
| 24. | FC Maurin (13) | 1–2 | Baillargues-Saint-Brès-Valergues (8) |
| 25. | CE Palavas (9) | 4–1 | AS Juvignac (9) |
| 26. | AS Celleneuve (10) | 2–2 (1–3 p) | RC Montpellier Cévennes (11) |
| 27. | AS La Grande-Motte (10) | 1–3 | Olympique Saint-André-de-Sangonis (8) |
| 28. | AS Saint-Mathieu-de-Tréviers (12) | 2–3 | AC Alignanais (10) |

These matches are from the Lot district, and were played on 24 and 25 August 2024.

First Round Results: Occitanie (Lot)
| Tie no | Home team (Tier) | Score | Away team (Tier) |
|---|---|---|---|
| 1. | Entente Cajarc Cenevières (10) | 3–1 | Entente Ségala Foot (9) |
| 2. | Entente Fons Fourmagnac Camburat (11) | 2–3 | FC Causse Sud 46 (9) |
| 3. | CA Salviacois (11) | 0–7 | Val Roc Foot (9) |
| 4. | Entente Mayrinhac Saint-Céré (11) | 3–2 | Entente Souillac-La Chapelle-Gignac (9) |
| 5. | Entente Cazals Montcléra (9) | 3–3 (5–4 p) | AS Causse Limargue (9) |
| 6. | FC Gréalou (10) | 1–1 (4–3 p) | CL Cuzance (11) |
| 7. | Pradines-Saint-Vincent-Douelle-Mercuès Olt (9) | 8–0 (Note: Tie reversed from original draw.) | US Saint-Pauloise (11) |
| 8. | US Nozacoise (11) | 1–2 | AS Livernon (10) |
| 9. | AS Saint-Matré Le Boulvé (12) | 1–3 | Haut Célé FC (10) |
| 10. | Élan Marivalois (9) | 5–0 | Puy-l'Évêque-Prayssac FC (9) |

These matches are from the Lozère district, and were played on 25 August 2024.

First Round Results: Occitanie (Lozère)
| Tie no | Home team (Tier) | Score | Away team (Tier) |
|---|---|---|---|
| 1. | Vaillante Aumonaise (11) | 2–2 (2–4 p) | AS Randonnaise (12) |
| 2. | Valdonnez FC (13) | 0–2 | Marvejols Sports (10) |
| 3. | AS Badaroux (11) | 0–1 | ESC Le Buisson (8) |
| 4. | ES Chirac-Le Monastier (12) | 7–1 | US Saint-Germanaise (12) |
| 5. | AS Chastelloise (10) | 3–1 | AS Chanac (11) |
| 6. | ES Rimeize (12) | 0–1 | AS Le Malzieu (11) |
| 7. | ASGF Mendois (12) | 0–4 | FC Montrodat (11) |

These matches are from the Hautes-Pyrénées district, and were played on 23, 24 and 25 August 2024.

First Round Results: Occitanie (Hautes-Pyrénées)
| Tie no | Home team (Tier) | Score | Away team (Tier) |
|---|---|---|---|
| 1. | ASC Aureilhan (9) | 0–2 | Quand Même Orleix (8) |
| 2. | Horgues-Odos FC (10) | 2–0 | ES Haut Adour (9) |
| 3. | Elan Pyrénéen Bazet-Bordères-Lagarde (8) | 3–2 | ASC Barbazan-Debat (9) |
| 4. | FC Bordes (11) | 0–3 | Tarbes FC (10) |
| 5. | FC des Nestes (9) | 2–1 | FC Plateau-Lannezman (9) |
| 6. | US Côteaux (10) | 1–2 | US Marquisat Bénac (9) |
| 7. | US Tarbais Nouvelle Vague (11) | 0–2 | FC Val d'Adour (9) |
| 8. | FC Bazillac (10) | 1–2 | FC Pyrénées/Vallées des Gaves (8) |

These matches are from the Pyrénées-Orientales district, and were played on 24 and 25 August 2024.

First Round Results: Occitanie (Pyrénées-Orientales)
| Tie no | Home team (Tier) | Score | Away team (Tier) |
|---|---|---|---|
| 1. | Baho-Pézilla FC (11) | 2–4 | Roussillon Football Canohès Toulouges (10) |
| 2. | Entente Conflentoise (9) | 0–3 | FC Le Soler (9) |
| 3. | SO Rivesaltais (8) | 2–3 | FC Claira/Saint-Laurent (8) |
| 4. | AF Catalan (9) | 3–1 | BECE FC Vallée de l'Aigly (10) |
| 5. | Association Théza Alénya Corneilla Olympique Catalan (12) | 1–3 | Cabestany OC (10) |
| 6. | Saint-Nazaire FC (12) | 1–3 | Le Boulou Saint-Jean FC (9) |
| 7. | FC Saint-Cyprien (9) | 1–2 | Sporting Perpignan Nord (8) |
| 8. | Racing Perpignan Méditerranée (9) | 3–0 (Note: Tie won by means of forfeit.) | Céret FC (9) |
| 9. | FC Thuirinois (9) | 4–0 | Bages Villeneuve Raho FC (10) |
| 10. | Saleilles OC (10) | 3–0 | FC Villelongue (9) |

These matches are from the Tarn district, and were played on 23, 24 and 25 August 2024, with one replayed on 28 August 2024.

First Round Results: Occitanie (Tarn)
| Tie no | Home team (Tier) | Score | Away team (Tier) |
|---|---|---|---|
| 1. | FC Le Garric (10) | 1–2 | US Cadalen (11) |
| 2. | ASE Puylaurens (10) | 3–1 (Note: ASE Puylaurens penalised for fielding an ineligible player, Terssac Albi FC qualify.) | Terssac Albi FC (10) |
| 3. | US Labruguièroise (10) | 0–4 | AS Giroussens (9) |
| 4. | La Mygale Le Séquestre Football (9) | 0–6 | Réalmont FC (9) |
| 5. | AS Vallée du Sor (10) | 6–2 | US Autan (10) |
| 6. | Rives du Tescou FC (11) | 0–5 | AS Pampelonnaise (9) |
| 7. | Teillet FC (11) | 1–0 | Sport Benfica Graulhet (10) |
| 8. | US Gaillacois (9) | 1–1 (3–4 p) (Note: The original match on 24 August 2024 was abandoned after 2 minutes as the pitch was judged unplayable due to bad weather.) | FC Vignoble 81 (8) |
| 9. | AS Pays Gaillacois Lagrave (9) | 4–0 | Cambounet FC (9) |
| 10. | FC Pigné (12) | 0–0 (4–3 p) | AS Briatexte (10) |
| 11. | AS Le Masnau-Massuguiès (12) | 1–2 | AS Albigeoise (11) |
| 12. | Sporting Castres (11) | 3–0 | AF Pays d'Oc 81 (10) |
| 13. | Roquecourbe FC (9) | 3–0 | US Carmaux (10) |
| 14. | Olympique Lautrec (10) | 8–0 | FC Labastide-de-Lévis (11) |
| 15. | ACS Labrespy (10) | 1–8 | Union Graulhetoise (8) |
| 16. | US Aiguefonde (12) | 0–6 | La Cremade FC (8) |
| 17. | US Castres (8) | 1–1 (2–4 p) | US Albi (8) |
| 18. | Thoré FC 81 (11) | 3–1 | Sorèze FC (11) |
| 19. | AS Payrin-Rigautou (10) | 4–1 | Les Copains d'Abord (10) |

These matches are from the Tarn-et-Garonne district, and were played on 24, 25 August 2024, with one replayed on 28 August 2024.

First Round Results: Occitanie (Tarn-et-Garonne)
| Tie no | Home team (Tier) | Score | Away team (Tier) |
|---|---|---|---|
| 1. | JS Meauzacaise (8) | 0–3 | US Malause (9) |
| 2. | FC Lomagne 82 (9) | 2–1 (Note: Tie reversed from original draw.) | AS Stéphanoise (10) |
| 3. | FC Brulhois (9) | 0–2 | JE Montalbanais (9) |
| 4. | Saint-Nauphary AC (9) | 2–0 | Étoile Sud 82 (10) |
| 5. | Avenir Magistérien Football (10) | 0–7 | FC Nègrepelisse-Montricoux (8) |
| 6. | Confluences FC (9) | 0–1 | Cazes Olympique (8) |
| 7. | Stade Caussadais (10) | 6–4 (Note: The original match on 24 August 2024 was abandoned after 20 minutes due to floodlight failure. The league instructed it to be replayed on 28 August 2024.) | FCUS Molières (10) |
| 8. | US Montbartier (10) | 0–1 | Corbarieu AC (10) |
| 9. | FC Quercy Rouergue (11) | 2–1 | Entente Montbeton-Lacourt (11) |
| 10. | Loubejac-Ardus FC (9) | 0–3 | SC Lafrançaise (9) |

=== Second round ===
These matches are from the Ariège district, and were played on 30 and 31 August, and 1 September 2024.

Second Round Results: Occitanie (Ariège)
| Tie no | Home team (Tier) | Score | Away team (Tier) |
|---|---|---|---|
| 1. | FC Pamiers (8) | 7–0 | EN Mazères (9) |
| 2. | ES Saint-Jean-du-Falga (9) | 4–1 | FC Saint-Girons (8) |
| 3. | FC Coussa-Hers (9) | 2–2 (2–4 p) | Luzenac AP (6) |
| 4. | FC Laroque d'Olmes (9) | 2–2 (3–4 p) | FC Saverdun (8) |
| 5. | AS Critourienne (9) | 1–4 | ES Fossatoise (8) |

These matches are from the Aude district, and were played on 31 August and 1 September 2024.

Second Round Results: Occitanie (Aude)
| Tie no | Home team (Tier) | Score | Away team (Tier) |
|---|---|---|---|
| 1. | FC Villedubert (10) | 0–4 | FC Alzonne (9) |
| 2. | Entente Naurouze-Labastide (8) | 4–1 | USA Pezens (9) |
| 3. | US Conques (7) | 4–1 | FA Carcassonne (7) |
| 4. | ES Fanjeaux (10) | 2–2 (2–4 p) | AS Bram (10) |
| 5. | US Minervois (9) | 1–0 | Limoux FC (10) |
| 6. | CO Castelnaudary (7) | 6–0 | FC Briolet (8) |
| 7. | Olympic Cuxac-d'Aude (9) | 1–5 | FU Narbonne (6) |
| 8. | US Montagne Noir (10) | 1–8 | FC Corbières Méditerranée (8) |
| 9. | FC Alaric (12) | 0–0 (3–4 p) | FC Saint-Nazairois (8) |
| 10. | Trèbes FC (8) | 5–1 | Olympique Corbières Sud Minervois (9) |
| 11. | FC Chalabre (10) | 0–2 | Leucate FC (11) |

These matches are from the Aveyron district, and were played on 31 August and 1 September 2024.

Second Round Results: Occitanie (Aveyron)
| Tie no | Home team (Tier) | Score | Away team (Tier) |
|---|---|---|---|
| 1. | US Larzac Vallées (11) | 0–5 | Ségala-Rieupeyroux-Salvetat (9) |
| 2. | Foot Vallon (10) | 2–0 | FC Monastère (8) |
| 3. | FC Saint-Georges-de-Luzençon (9) | 3–2 | Ouest Aveyron Football (8) |
| 4. | Luc Primaube FC (8) | 2–1 | SO Millau (8) |
| 5. | Entente Villecomtal-Mouret-Pruines-Entraygues (10) | 0–3 | Druelle FC (7) |
| 6. | AS Moyrazès (10) | 0–1 | Pareloup Céor FC (10) |
| 7. | Stade Saint-Affricain (8) | 1–1 (0–2 p) | US Montbazens Rignac (8) |
| 8. | Espoir FC 88 (8) | 2–3 | AS Olemps (9) |
| 9. | FC Naucellois (9) | 0–4 | FC Comtal (7) |
| 10. | JS Bassin Aveyron (8) | 3–2 | AS Aguessac (9) |
| 11. | US Espalion (9) | 2–1 | Association Saint-Laurentaise Cantonale Canourguaise (10) |

These matches are from the Gard district, and were played on 1 September 2024, with one replayed on 8 September 2024.

Second Round Results: Occitanie (Gard)
| Tie no | Home team (Tier) | Score | Away team (Tier) |
|---|---|---|---|
| 1. | Calvisson FC (10) | 5–2 | GC Quissac (11) |
| 2. | ES Rochefort Signargues (11) | 3–1 (Note: The original game on 1 September 2024 was ruled void by the league, after a refereeing error was reported. The league ordered the game replayed.) | AS Saint-Paulet-de-Caisson (11) |
| 3. | SC Anduzien (8) | 2–1 | CA Bessegeoise (9) |
| 4. | EF Vézénobres Cruviers (10) | 1–3 | FC Moussac (9) |
| 5. | FC Langlade (10) | 0–3 | ES Suménoise (8) |
| 6. | SA Cigalois (11) | 0–4 | FC Vauverdois (6) |
| 7. | FC Val de Cèze (9) | 6–0 | ES Théziers (10) |
| 8. | All Five Académie (10) | 1–3 | CO Soleil Levant Nîmes (10) |
| 9. | GC Uchaud (8) | 2–2 (2–4 p) | JS Chemin Bas d'Avignon (7) |
| 10. | US Garons (10) | 0–2 | SO Aimargues (7) |
| 11. | ES Pays d'Uzes (7) | 0–3 | AS Rousson (7) |
| 12. | FC Bagnols Escanaux (10) | 2–7 | ES Grau-du-Roi (6) |
| 13. | Olympique Fourquésien (10) | 1–1 (6–7 p) | ES Marguerittes (8) |
| 14. | RC Saint-Laurent-des-Arbres (11) | 0–4 | FC Cabassut (9) |
| 15. | Stade Sainte-Barbe (9) | 2–0 | SC Saint-Martin-de-Valgalgues (10) |
| 16. | AC Pissevin Valdegour (9) | 0–2 | FC Bagnols Pont (7) |

These matches are from the Haute-Garonne district, and were played on 31 August and 1 September 2024.

Second Round Results: Occitanie (Haute-Garonne)
| Tie no | Home team (Tier) | Score | Away team (Tier) |
|---|---|---|---|
| 1. | SC Valentine (11) | 0–3 | US Pouvourville (8) |
| 2. | Bruguières SC (11) | 3–2 | RC Muret (11) |
| 3. | JS Auzielle Lauzerville (11) | 1–2 | Saint-Orens FC (8) |
| 4. | EFC Aurignac (9) | 2–5 | JS Cugnaux (7) |
| 5. | US Bouloc Saint-Sauveur (10) | 1–2 | Saint-Alban Aucamville FC (6) |
| 6. | Grenade FC (10) | 0–9 | Union Saint-Jean FC (6) |
| 7. | AS Castelnau-d'Estrétefonds (9) | 0–2 | US Seysses-Frouzins (7) |
| 8. | JS Brax (10) | 0–3 | Juventus de Papus (7) |
| 9. | US Bérat (10) | 0–12 | Toulouse Rodéo FC (6) |
| 10. | Toulouse Olympique Aviation Club (9) | 1–3 | AS Lavernose-Lherm-Mauzac (8) |
| 11. | AS Longages (10) | 1–1 (3–5 p) | ERCSO L'Isle-en-Dodon (7) |
| 12. | US Léguevin (7) | 4–0 | US Cazères (7) |
| 13. | Saint-Lys Olympique FC (9) | 0–4 | Toulouse Football Compans Caffarelli (9) |
| 14. | FC Bessières-Buzet (13) | 0–9 | Toulouse Métropole FC (6) |
| 15. | US Plaisance-du-Touch (7) | 2–1 | Baziège OC (7) |
| 16. | Toulouse Cheminots Marengo Sports (12) | 1–1 (4–3 p) | AC Garona (10) |
| 17. | Pyrénées Sud Comminges (9) | 4–2 | US Castelginest (9) |
| 18. | FC Bagatelle (10) | 3–0 | Olympique Girou FC (7) |
| 19. | AS Tournefeuille (8) | 2–7 | Balma SC (6) |
| 20. | UA Fenouillet (8) | 1–1 (3–1 p) | JS Cintegabelle (8) |
| 21. | ES Saint-Simon (9) | 1–3 | JE Toulousaine Croix-Daurade (7) |
| 22. | ES Le Fousseret-Mondavezan (10) | 0–8 | US Revel (6) |
| 23. | Lauragais FC (11) | 0–4 | Comminges Saint-Gaudens (7) |
| 24. | EFC de la Vallée (9) | 3–2 | JS Carbonne (8) |
| 25. | FC Mahorais Toulouse (12) | 2–9 | AS Muret (6) |
| 26. | Toulouse Rangueil FC (9) | 2–3 | Avenir Fonsorbais (6) |
| 27. | US Pibrac (7) | 6–0 | US Salies-du-Salat/Mane/Saint-Martory (7) |
| 28. | AS Toulouse Mirail (8) | 3–3 (4–3 p) | Entente Boulogne-Péguilhan (7) |
| 29. | FC Canal Nord (11) | 4–1 | Football Algérien Toulousain (11) |

These matches are from the Gers district, and were played on 30 and 31 August and 1 September 2024.

Second Round Results: Occitanie (Gers)
| Tie no | Home team (Tier) | Score | Away team (Tier) |
|---|---|---|---|
| 1. | US Aignanais (8) | 7–1 | Sud Astarac 2010 (9) |
| 2. | UA Vic-Fezensac (9) | 1–1 (4–5 p) | Auch Football (7) |
| 3. | Sainte-Christie-Preignan AS (9) | 1–2 | US Aubiet (9) |
| 4. | FC Pavien (8) | 2–0 | AS Ségoufielle (9) |
| 5. | ES Cologne-Sarrant (9) | 1–1 (4–3 p) | ES Gimontoise (8) |
| 6. | FC L'Isle-Jourdain (8) | 3–2 | Eauze FC (9) |

These matches are from the Hérault district, and were played on 31 August and 1 September 2024.

Second Round Results: Occitanie (Hérault)
| Tie no | Home team (Tier) | Score | Away team (Tier) |
|---|---|---|---|
| 1. | RC Montpellier Cévennes (11) | 4–3 | CE Palavas (9) |
| 2. | Stade Balarucois (8) | 0–5 | AS Atlas Paillade (6) |
| 3. | SC Saint-Thibérien (9) | 1–1 (6–5 p) | PI Vendargues (7) |
| 4. | Avenir Castriote (11) | 4–4 (1–3 p) | Entente AS Gignac/US Puget (9) |
| 5. | Entente Corneilhan-Lignan (10) | 0–2 | ES Pérols (8) |
| 6. | Arsenal Croix d'Argent (11) | 0–3 | Baillargues-Saint-Brès-Valergues (8) |
| 7. | AS Pignan (7) | 1–3 | La Clermontaise Football (6) |
| 8. | FC Boujan (13) | 3–4 | Arceaux Montpellier (10) |
| 9. | FO Sud Hérault (8) | 2–2 (3–2 p) | ES Pérols (8) |
| 10. | FC Domitia (10) | 0–2 | AS Méditerrannée 34 (7) |
| 11. | AS Puimissoniase (10) | 1–5 | AS Frontignan AC (6) |
| 12. | Olympique La Peyrade FC (9) | 3–3 (3–5 p) | FC Petit Bard (7) |
| 13. | US Basses Cévennes (11) | 1–4 | Olympique Saint-André-de-Sangonis (8) |
| 14. | AC Alignanais (10) | 1–7 | GC Lunel (6) |
| 15. | FC Sauvian (11) | 1–4 | AS Fabrègues (6) |
| 16. | AS Canet (9) | 0–0 (3–4 p) | AS Lattes (7) |
| 17. | US Saint-Martinoise (12) | 1–0 | FC Lespignan-Vendres (9) |
| 18. | RC Vedasien (8) | 0–1 | AS Béziers (6) |
| 19. | FC Saint-Pargoire (11) | 0–6 | Jacou Clapiers FA (10) |
| 20. | US Mauguio Carnon (8) | 4–0 | Entente Saint-Clément-Montferrier (6) |
| 21. | ROC Social Sète (12) | 1–11 | Castelnau Le Crès FC (7) |
| 22. | AS Valerguoise (11) | 0–4 | SC Sète (7) |
| 23. | Mèze Stade FC (8) | 0–1 | FC Sussargues-Berange (9) |

These matches are from the Lot district, and were played on 30 and 31 August, and 1 September 2024.

Second Round Results: Occitanie (Lot)
| Tie no | Home team (Tier) | Score | Away team (Tier) |
|---|---|---|---|
| 1. | AS Livernon (10) | 0–2 | FC Lalbenque-Fontanes (9) |
| 2. | Élan Marivalois (9) | 1–0 | Figeac Capdenac Quercy FC (7) |
| 3. | Val Roc Foot (9) | 9–0 | FC Gréalou (10) |
| 4. | Entente Cajarc Cenevières (10) | 0–6 | Cahors FC (7) |
| 5. | Haut Célé FC (10) | 6–3 | Entente Cazals Montcléra (9) |
| 6. | Pradines-Saint-Vincent-Douelle-Mercuès Olt (9) | 0–3 | AF Biars-Bretenoux (6) |
| 7. | FC Causse Sud 46 (9) | 0–1 | FC Haut Quercy (9) |
| 8. | Entente Mayrinhac Saint-Céré (11) | 6–1 | US3C Catus (10) |

These matches are from the Lozère district, and were played on 1 September 2024.

Second Round Results: Occitanie (Lozère)
| Tie no | Home team (Tier) | Score | Away team (Tier) |
|---|---|---|---|
| 1. | AS Le Malzieu (11) | 2–3 | ES Chirac-Le Monastier (12) |
| 2. | Marvejols Sports (10) | 1–0 | FC Montrodat (11) |
| 3. | AS Randonnaise (12) | 1–5 | ESC Le Buisson (8) |
| 4. | AS Chastelloise (10) | 0–7 | AF Lozère (6) |

These matches are from the Hautes-Pyrénées district, and were played on 31 August and 1 September 2024.

Second Round Results: Occitanie (Hautes-Pyrénées)
| Tie no | Home team (Tier) | Score | Away team (Tier) |
|---|---|---|---|
| 1. | FC Val d'Adour (9) | 1–3 | FC des Nestes (9) |
| 2. | FC Lourdais XI (7) | 3–0 | Soues Cigognes FC (8) |
| 3. | Quand Même Orleix (8) | 2–1 | US Marquisat Bénac (9) |
| 4. | Boutons d'Or Ger (9) | 5–2 | Horgues-Odos FC (10) |
| 5. | Séméac OFC (8) | 4–1 | Elan Pyrénéen Bazet-Bordères-Lagarde (8) |
| 6. | FC Pyrénées/Vallées des Gaves (8) | 3–2 | Juillan OS (8) |
| 7. | Tarbes FC (10) | 0–5 | Tarbes Pyrénées Football (6) |

These matches are from the Pyrénées-Orientales district, and were played on 1 September 2024.

Second Round Results: Occitanie (Pyrénées-Orientales)
| Tie no | Home team (Tier) | Score | Away team (Tier) |
|---|---|---|---|
| 1. | Le Boulou Saint-Jean FC (9) | 1–3 | Sporting Perpignan Nord (8) |
| 2. | AF Catalan (9) | 4–2 | OC Perpignan (7) |
| 3. | Roussillon Football Canohès Toulouges (10) | 2–2 (4–5 p) | Racing Perpignan Méditerranée (9) |
| 4. | Saleilles OC (10) | 2–1 | Cabestany OC (10) |
| 5. | FC Le Soler (9) | 1–2 | Union Saint-Estève Espoir Perpignan Méditerannée Métropole (6) |
| 6. | FC Claira/Saint-Laurent (8) | 1–0 | FC Thuirinois (9) |

These matches are from the Tarn district, and were played on 31 August and 1 September 2024.

Second Round Results: Occitanie (Tarn)
| Tie no | Home team (Tier) | Score | Away team (Tier) |
|---|---|---|---|
| 1. | FC Pigné (12) | 1–0 | Olympique Lautrec (10) |
| 2. | AS Vallée du Sor (10) | 0–4 | FC Pays Mazamétain (7) |
| 3. | Sporting Castres (11) | 2–2 (3–4 p) | La Cremade FC (8) |
| 4. | Albi Marssac Tarn Football ASPTT (7) | 2–2 (8–9 p) | Lavaur FC (7) |
| 5. | AS Pampelonnaise (9) | 4–1 | Terssac Albi FC (10) |
| 6. | AS Albigeoise (11) | 4–3 | Thoré FC 81 (11) |
| 7. | Réalmont FC (9) | 2–3 | Union Graulhetoise (8) |
| 8. | AS Pays Gaillacois Lagrave (9) | 2–3 | Saint-Juéry OF (7) |
| 9. | AS Payrin-Rigautou (10) | 1–2 | US Albi (8) |
| 10. | US Cadalen (11) | 2–3 | Roquecourbe FC (9) |
| 11. | AS Giroussens (9) | 3–2 | US Saint-Sulpice (7) |
| 12. | Teillet FC (11) | 1–4 | FC Vignoble 81 (8) |

These matches are from the Tarn-et-Garonne district, and were played on 31 August and 1 September 2024.

Second Round Results: Occitanie (Tarn-et-Garonne)
| Tie no | Home team (Tier) | Score | Away team (Tier) |
|---|---|---|---|
| 1. | SC Lafrançaise (9) | 1–2 | JE Montalbanais (9) |
| 2. | FC Lomagne 82 (9) | 3–0 | Stade Caussadais (10) |
| 3. | FC Quercy Rouergue (11) | 0–8 | La Nicolaite (8) |
| 4. | Cazes Olympique (8) | 0–3 | FC Nègrepelisse-Montricoux (8) |
| 5. | US Malause (9) | 0–2 | AS Bressols (7) |
| 6. | Corbarieu AC (10) | 0–8 | FC 2 Rives 82 (6) |
| 7. | AA Grisolles (7) | 0–0 (2–4 p) | FC Garonne Gascogne (7) |
| 8. | Saint-Nauphary AC (9) | 0–8 | Montauban FCTG (6) |

=== Third round ===
These matches were played on 13, 14 and 15 September 2024.

Third Round Results: Occitanie
| Tie no | Home team (Tier) | Score | Away team (Tier) |
|---|---|---|---|
| 1. | FC Moussac (9) | 0–1 | AS Rousson (7) |
| 2. | AS Lattes (7) | 7–2 | ESC Le Buisson (8) |
| 3. | US Saint-Martinoise (12) | 0–5 | SO Aimargues (7) |
| 4. | SC Anduzien (8) | 1–0 | Stade Sainte-Barbe (9) |
| 5. | CO Soleil Levant Nîmes (10) | 1–4 | ES Pérols (8) |
| 6. | JS Chemin Bas d'Avignon (7) | 0–0 (4–5 p) | ES Marguerittes (8) |
| 7. | Olympique Saint-André-de-Sangonis (8) | 0–0 (4–3 p) | US Mauguio Carnon (8) |
| 8. | Baillargues-Saint-Brès-Valergues (8) | 1–3 | ES Suménoise (8) |
| 9. | Calvisson FC (10) | 0–9 | Olympique Alès (5) |
| 10. | Jacou Clapiers FA (10) | 0–3 | FC Bagnols Pont (7) |
| 11. | RC Montpellier Cévennes (11) | 0–4 | Castelnau Le Crès FC (7) |
| 12. | FC Sussargues-Berange (9) | 5–0 | FC Val de Cèze (9) |
| 13. | ES Rochefort Signargues (11) | 0–8 | FC Vauverdois (6) |
| 14. | FC Cabassut (9) | 2–2 (11–12 p) | Stade Beaucairois (5) |
| 15. | Marvejols Sports (10) | 0–7 | GC Lunel (6) |
| 16. | ES Grau-du-Roi (6) | 1–1 (5–4 p) | AS Atlas Paillade (6) |
| 17. | US Minervois (9) | 1–4 | RCO Agde (5) |
| 18. | FC Saint-Nazairois (8) | 0–0 (2–4 p) | Entente Naurouze-Labastide (8) |
| 19. | FC Alzonne (9) | 2–2 (4–2 p) | Saleilles OC (10) |
| 20. | FC Corbières Méditerranée (8) | 1–2 | CO Castelnaudary (7) |
| 21. | US Conques (7) | 2–2 (4–3 p) | FO Sud Hérault (8) |
| 22. | FC Pays Mazamétain (7) | 0–6 | FC Claira/Saint-Laurent (8) |
| 23. | SC Saint-Thibérien (9) | 0–2 | US Salinières Aigues Mortes (5) |
| 24. | Racing Perpignan Méditerranée (9) | 2–2 (5–3 p) | La Clermontaise Football (6) |
| 25. | Entente AS Gignac/US Puget (9) | 3–4 | AS Fabrègues (6) |
| 26. | Sporting Perpignan Nord (8) | 1–1 (5–6 p) | AS Béziers (6) |
| 27. | SC Sète (7) | 1–2 | FU Narbonne (6) |
| 28. | AF Catalan (9) | 2–1 | AS Méditerrannée 34 (7) |
| 29. | Leucate FC (11) | 0–1 | Trèbes FC (8) |
| 30. | Arceaux Montpellier (10) | 1–2 | FC Petit Bard (7) |
| 31. | FC Saint-Georges-de-Luzençon (9) | 0–2 | AS Frontignan AC (6) |
| 32. | Union Saint-Estève Espoir Perpignan Méditerannée Métropole (6) | 2–0 | US Plaisance-du-Touch (7) |
| 33. | Union Graulhetoise (8) | 2–0 | ES Fossatoise (8) |
| 34. | US Revel (5) | 1–3 | Canet Roussillon FC (5) |
| 35. | Saint-Orens FC (8) | 5–1 | AS Toulouse Mirail (8) |
| 36. | FC Saverdun (8) | 3–2 | EFC de la Vallée (9) |
| 37. | Toulouse Football Compans Caffarelli (9) | 1–2 | FC Alberes Argelès (5) |
| 38. | AS Pampelonnaise (9) | 0–4 | US Pibrac (7) |
| 39. | AS Albigeoise (11) | 0–2 | AS Giroussens (9) |
| 40. | Roquecourbe FC (9) | 1–4 | Lavaur FC (7) |
| 41. | FC Pamiers (8) | 1–1 (5–3 p) | Luzenac AP (6) |
| 42. | La Cremade FC (8) | 4–0 | ES Saint-Jean-du-Falga (9) |
| 43. | AS Bram (10) | 0–4 | US Léguevin (7) |
| 44. | JE Toulousaine Croix-Daurade (7) | 0–2 | Balma SC (6) |
| 45. | FC Pigné (12) | 0–2 | AS Olemps (9) |
| 46. | Juventus de Papus (7) | 0–3 | Union Saint-Jean FC (6) |
| 47. | FC Pavien (8) | 1–1 (3–5 p) | Pyrénées Sud Comminges (9) |
| 48. | FC L'Isle-Jourdain (8) | 0–5 | Avenir Fonsorbais (6) |
| 49. | AS Lavernose-Lherm-Mauzac (8) | 0–4 | JS Cugnaux (7) |
| 50. | JE Montalbanais (9) | 0–0 (2–3 p) | US Aubiet (9) |
| 51. | Séméac OFC (8) | 2–1 | FC Pyrénées/Vallées des Gaves (8) |
| 52. | ERCSO L'Isle-en-Dodon (7) | 0–1 | Tarbes Pyrénées Football (6) |
| 53. | Toulouse Rodéo FC (6) | 6–0 | US Seysses-Frouzins (7) |
| 54. | Foot Vallon (10) | 0–9 | AS Muret (6) |
| 55. | Toulouse Cheminots Marengo Sports (12) | 3–2 | FC des Nestes (9) |
| 56. | Toulouse Métropole FC (6) | 2–1 | FC Lourdais XI (7) |
| 57. | US Pouvourville (8) | 1–5 | US Castanéenne (5) |
| 58. | Bruguières SC (11) | 0–0 (4–3 p) | US Aignanais (8) |
| 59. | Auch Football (7) | 0–2 | US Colomiers Football (5) |
| 60. | Comminges Saint-Gaudens (7) | 0–0 (1–2 p) | Quand Même Orleix (8) |
| 61. | FC Canal Nord (11) | 0–1 | Boutons d'Or Ger (9) |
| 62. | FC Bagatelle (10) | 5–0 | ES Cologne-Sarrant (9) |
| 63. | Luc Primaube FC (8) | 2–2 (4–2 p) | Onet-le-Château Football (5) |
| 64. | FC Vignoble 81 (8) | 1–2 | JS Bassin Aveyron (8) |
| 65. | La Nicolaite (8) | 1–4 | AS Bressols (7) |
| 66. | Élan Marivalois (9) | 3–0 | Val Roc Foot (9) |
| 67. | Saint-Juéry OF (7) | 0–3 | Blagnac FC (5) |
| 68. | Saint-Alban Aucamville FC (6) | 1–3 | FC 2 Rives 82 (6) |
| 69. | Ségala-Rieupeyroux-Salvetat (9) | 0–5 | US Montbazens Rignac (8) |
| 70. | FC Lalbenque-Fontanes (9) | 0–4 | Montauban FCTG (6) |
| 71. | US Espalion (9) | 2–2 (3–4 p) | Druelle FC (7) |
| 72. | Cahors FC (7) | 2–0 | US Albi (8) |
| 73. | UA Fenouillet (8) | 2–2 (9–8 p) | AF Lozère (6) |
| 74. | ES Chirac-Le Monastier (12) | 2–5 | FC Garonne Gascogne (7) |
| 75. | Pareloup Céor FC (10) | 0–1 | FC Nègrepelisse-Montricoux (8) |
| 76. | Entente Mayrinhac Saint-Céré (11) | 1–2 | FC Haut Quercy (9) |
| 77. | FC Lomagne 82 (9) | 0–5 | FC Comtal (7) |
| 78. | Haut Célé FC (10) | 1–7 | AF Biars-Bretenoux (6) |

=== Fourth round ===
These matches were played on 28 and 29 September 2024.

Fourth Round Results: Occitanie
| Tie no | Home team (Tier) | Score | Away team (Tier) |
|---|---|---|---|
| 1. | AS Fabrègues (6) | 3–3 (3–4 p) | ES Grau-du-Roi (6) |
| 2. | FC Vauverdois (6) | 0–3 | Stade Beaucairois (5) |
| 3. | SO Aimargues (7) | 5–2 | ES Marguerittes (8) |
| 4. | Racing Perpignan Méditerranée (9) | 4–2 | AS Frontignan AC (6) |
| 5. | FC Claira/Saint-Laurent (8) | 2–0 | ES Suménoise (8) |
| 6. | FC Bagatelle (10) | 1–2 | FC Bagnols Pont (7) |
| 7. | US Salinières Aigues Mortes (5) | 0–3 | Olympique Alès (5) |
| 8. | Trèbes FC (8) | 2–0 | ES Pérols (8) |
| 9. | SC Anduzien (8) | 3–1 | GC Lunel (6) |
| 10. | FC Sussargues-Berange (9) | 2–0 | AS Rousson (7) |
| 11. | FC Petit Bard (7) | 0–1 | Olympique Saint-André-de-Sangonis (8) |
| 12. | Castelnau Le Crès FC (7) | 1–2 | AS Lattes (7) |
| 13. | AF Catalan (9) | 1–3 | AS Béziers (6) |
| 14. | JS Cugnaux (7) | 2–3 | Toulouse Rodéo FC (6) |
| 15. | Toulouse Cheminots Marengo Sports (12) | 2–7 | AS Muret (6) |
| 16. | AS Olemps (9) | 1–1 (3–4 p) | Saint-Orens FC (8) |
| 17. | US Léguevin (7) | 1–2 | FC Pamiers (8) |
| 18. | FC Saverdun (8) | 1–2 | FU Narbonne (6) |
| 19. | CO Castelnaudary (7) | 0–1 | RCO Agde (5) |
| 20. | Canet Roussillon FC (5) | 3–1 | Toulouse Métropole FC (6) |
| 21. | AS Giroussens (9) | 0–3 | Union Saint-Jean FC (6) |
| 22. | Entente Naurouze-Labastide (8) | 0–1 | FC Alberes Argelès (5) |
| 23. | Pyrénées Sud Comminges (9) | 1–1 (3–5 p) | US Conques (7) |
| 24. | US Pibrac (7) | 3–0 | La Cremade FC (8) |
| 25. | Union Graulhetoise (8) | 0–4 | Union Saint-Estève Espoir Perpignan Méditerannée Métropole (6) |
| 26. | FC Alzonne (9) | 0–1 | Lavaur FC (7) |
| 27. | AS Bressols (7) | 1–1 (6–5 p) | US Castanéenne (5) |
| 28. | Luc Primaube FC (8) | 1–3 | FC 2 Rives 82 (6) |
| 29. | Cahors FC (7) | 2–3 | Blagnac FC (5) |
| 30. | FC Haut Quercy (9) | 0–3 | FC Comtal (7) |
| 31. | FC Garonne Gascogne (7) | 0–2 | US Colomiers Football (5) |
| 32. | Montauban FCTG (6) | 4–0 | Druelle FC (7) |
| 33. | Balma SC (6) | 4–0 | Avenir Fonsorbais (6) |
| 34. | Séméac OFC (8) | 3–3 (4–3 p) | UA Fenouillet (8) |
| 35. | Bruguières SC (11) | 1–1 (5–3 p) | FC Nègrepelisse-Montricoux (8) |
| 36. | Boutons d'Or Ger (9) | 1–2 | Élan Marivalois (9) |
| 37. | JS Bassin Aveyron (8) | 3–0 | US Aubiet (9) |
| 38. | Quand Même Orleix (8) | 0–1 | Tarbes Pyrénées Football (6) |
| 39. | US Montbazens Rignac (8) | 0–1 | AF Biars-Bretenoux (6) |

=== Fifth round ===
These matches were played on 12 and 13 October 2024.

Fifth Round Results: Occitanie
| Tie no | Home team (Tier) | Score | Away team (Tier) |
|---|---|---|---|
| 1. | AS Béziers (6) | 5–1 | Lavaur FC (7) |
| 2. | SC Anduzien (8) | 3–1 | Toulouse Rodéo FC (6) |
| 3. | Olympique Alès (5) | 1–0 | Balma SC (6) |
| 4. | Trèbes FC (8) | 2–2 (3–5 p) | AF Biars-Bretenoux (6) |
| 5. | FC Bagnols Pont (7) | 4–0 | US Conques (7) |
| 6. | US Pibrac (7) | 2–1 | JS Bassin Aveyron (8) |
| 7. | Élan Marivalois (9) | 0–2 | US Colomiers Football (5) |
| 8. | Olympique Saint-André-de-Sangonis (8) | 1–4 | AS Muret (6) |
| 9. | Saint-Orens FC (8) | 2–0 | FC 2 Rives 82 (6) |
| 10. | AS Lattes (7) | 4–0 | AS Bressols (7) |
| 11. | FC Claira/Saint-Laurent (8) | 1–2 | Tarbes Pyrénées Football (6) |
| 12. | SO Aimargues (7) | 1–4 | Nîmes Olympique (3) |
| 13. | Blagnac FC (5) | 1–0 | Montauban FCTG (6) |
| 14. | FC Sussargues-Berange (9) | 6–0 | Séméac OFC (8) |
| 15. | FC Pamiers (8) | 1–3 | Union Saint-Jean FC (6) |
| 16. | Racing Perpignan Méditerranée (9) | 1–3 | ES Grau-du-Roi (6) |
| 17. | Bruguières SC (11) | 0–2 | Canet Roussillon FC (5) |
| 18. | Union Saint-Estève Espoir Perpignan Méditerannée Métropole (6) | 0–1 | RCO Agde (5) |
| 19. | FU Narbonne (6) | 0–1 | Stade Beaucairois (5) |
| 20. | FC Comtal (7) | 2–1 | FC Alberes Argelès (5) |

=== Sixth round ===
These matches were played on 26 and 27 October 2024, with one rearranged for 3 November 2024.

Sixth Round Results: Occitanie
| Tie no | Home team (Tier) | Score | Away team (Tier) |
|---|---|---|---|
| 1. | ES Grau-du-Roi (6) | 3–0 | AS Béziers (6) |
| 2. | FC Sussargues-Berange (9) | 1–2 | Olympique Alès (5) |
| 3. | Union Saint-Jean FC (6) | 2–2 (4–2 p) | US Pibrac (7) |
| 4. | Stade Beaucairois (5) | 3–2 | Nîmes Olympique (3) |
| 5. | FC Bagnols Pont (7) | 0–3 | Canet Roussillon FC (5) |
| 6. | AS Lattes (7) | 1–1 (1–3 p) (Note: The match was postponed from 26 October 2024 until 3 November 2024, due to an ongoing investigation into the validity of the result of the game involving SC Anduzien in the fifth round.) | SC Anduzien (8) |
| 7. | AS Muret (6) | 0–1 | US Colomiers Football (5) |
| 8. | Tarbes Pyrénées Football (6) | 0–1 | RCO Agde (5) |
| 9. | Saint-Orens FC (8) | 0–1 | AF Biars-Bretenoux (6) |
| 10. | FC Comtal (7) | 1–1 (4–2 p) | Blagnac FC (5) |
