= Patrice Beaumelle =

French footballer and coach (born 1978)

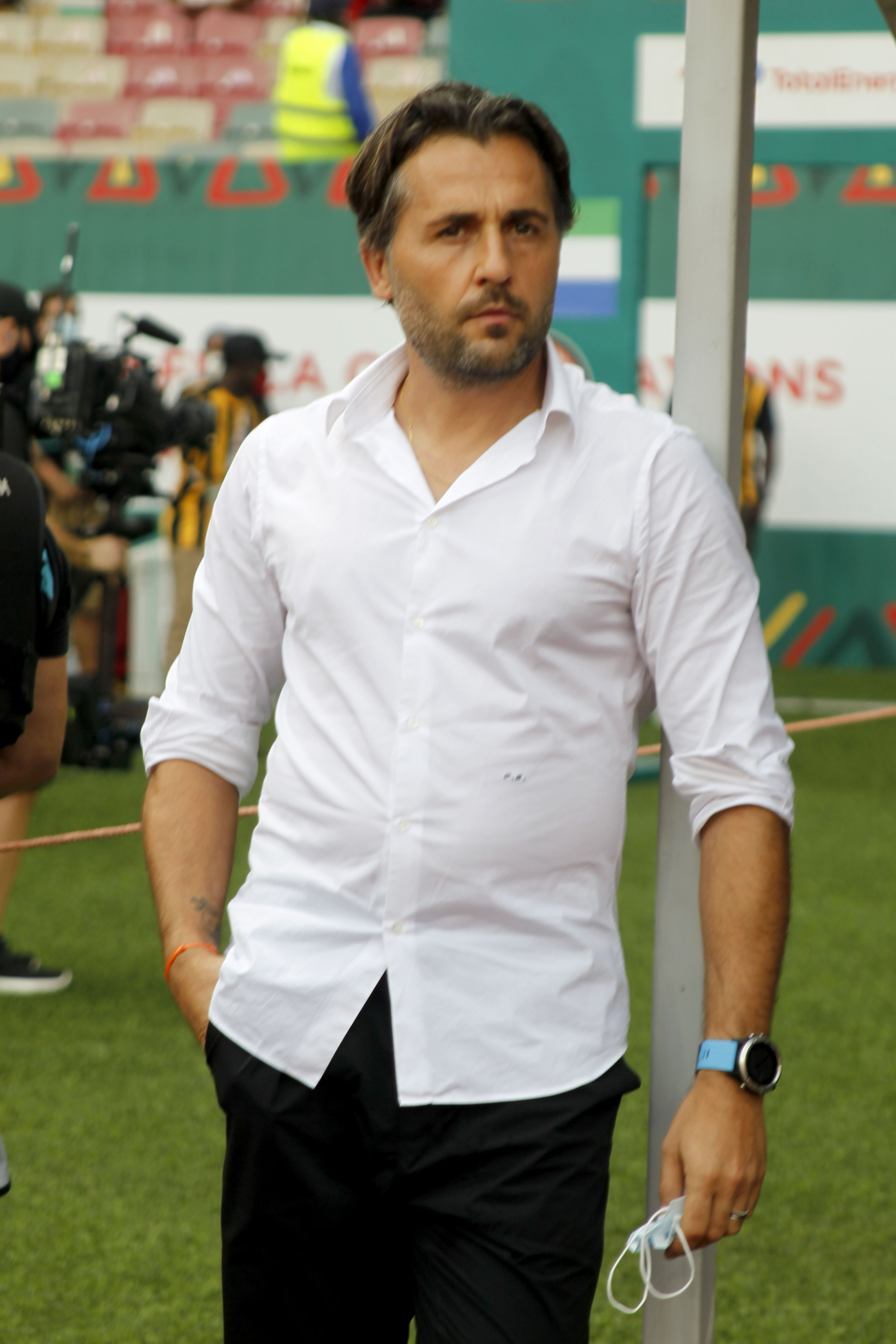
- Beaumelle with Ivory Coast in 2021

Personal information
- Full name: Patrice Amir Beaumelle
- Date of birth: 24 April 1978 (age 48)
- Place of birth: Arles, France
- Height: 1.85 m (6 ft 1 in)
- Position: Defender

Youth career
- 1986–1991: Stade Beaucairois
- 1991–2000: Nîmes

Senior career*
Years	Team	Apps	(Gls)
2000–2005	ES Grau-du-Roi		

Managerial career
- 2005: ES Grau-du-Roi
- 2012–2013: Zambia (assistant)
- 2013–2014: Zambia
- 2014–2015: Ivory Coast (assistant)
- 2016–2019: Morocco (assistant)
- 2019–2020: Morocco U23
- 2020–2022: Ivory Coast
- 2023–2024: MC Alger
- 2025: Umm Salal
- 2025–2026: Angola
- 2026: Espérance de Tunis
- * Club domestic league appearances and goals

Patrice Amir Beaumelle (born 24 April 1978) is a French football coach and former player. For most of his career he worked with compatriot Hervé Renard as Renard's assistant.

== Career ==
In 2010, Beaumelle was an assistant to Renard for the Angola national team., and in 2011 he also was assistant to Renard at Algerian club USM Alger.

Beaumelle also had previously been the assistant manager to Renard at Zambia national team from 2011. After Renard left his post in 2013 to take charge of FC Sochaux, Beaumelle was appointed as his successor. Following Herve Renard's appointment as manager of the Ivory Coast on 31 July 2014, Beaumelle handed in his resignation to the Football Association of Zambia, and joined Ivory Coast as Renard's assistant.

In November 2020, Patrice Beaumelle was reappointed at the head of the Ivorian football selection.

On September 29, 2025 he was appointed head coach of Angola.

== Personal life ==
Beaumelle converted to Islam on 15 April 2024. His decision was caused by neoteric events in the Gaza Strip in Palestine. Beaumelle, who was deeply stirred by the unfolding events and also wanted to learn more about faith, eventually led him to embrace the Islamic faith.

== Managerial statistics ==
As of match played 10 May 2026

Managerial record by team and tenure
Team	From	To	Record				
Team	From	To	G	W	D	L	Win %
Zambia	8 October 2013	31 July 2014	2	0	0	2	0.00
Morocco U23	1 August 2019	31 January 2020	1	0	1	0	0.00
Ivory Coast	4 March 2020	6 April 2022	20	10	5	5	50.00
MC Alger	3 March 2023	16 December 2024	65	36	19	10	55.38
Umm Salal	2 February 2025	30 June 2025	12	5	1	6	41.67
Angola	29 September 2025	14 February 2026	8	2	4	2	25.00
Espérance de Tunis	21 February 2026	11 May 2026	14	6	5	3	42.86
Total			122	59	35	28	48.36

== Honours ==
=== As a manager ===
MC Alger

- Algerian Ligue Professionnelle 1: 2023–24
