= Vincent Scotté =

French footballer (born 1987)

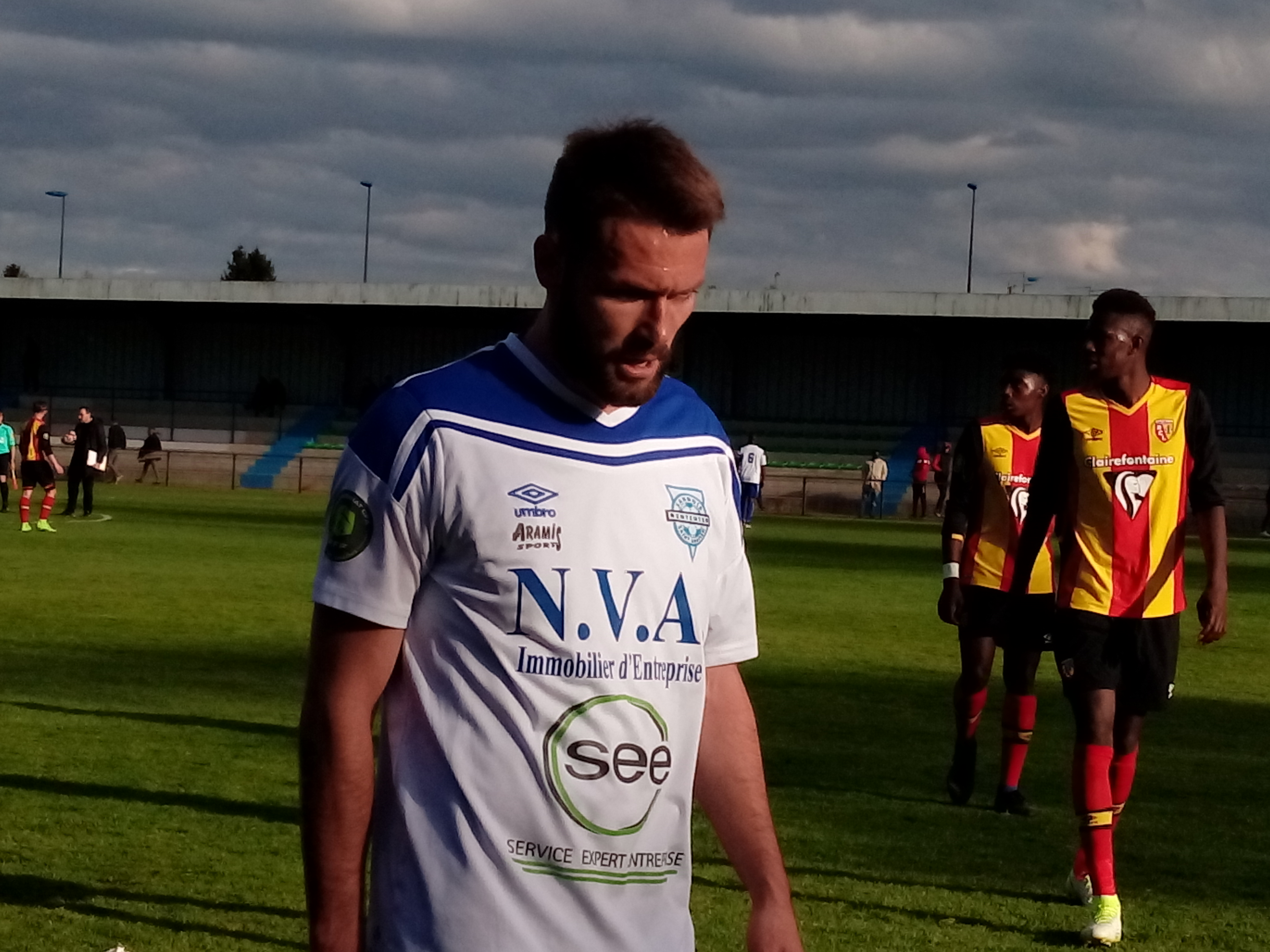

Personal information
- Date of birth: 16 July 1987 (age 39)
- Place of birth: Vincennes, France
- Height: 1.80 m (5 ft 11 in)
- Position: Midfielder

Team information
- Current team: AS Fabrègues

Senior career*
Years	Team	Apps	(Gls)
2006–2007	Ajaccio	13	(0)
2007–2010	Villemomble	68	(11)
2010–2011	Pacy-sur-Eure	35	(4)
2011–2013	Paris	48	(2)
2013–2014	Uzès	15	(0)
2014–2015	Les Herbiers	29	(5)
2015–2017	L'Entente SSG	41	(10)
2017–2018	Fleury	27	(0)
2018–2019	Boulogne-Billancourt	17	(2)
2019–	AS Fabrègues	10	(1)
- * Club domestic league appearances and goals as of 01:46, 3 November 2019 (UTC)

Vincent Scotté (born 16 July 1987) is a French footballer who plays as a midfielder for AS Fabrègues. He made 13 appearances in Ligue 2 with AC Ajaccio.
