= Benjamin Psaume =

French footballer (born 1985)

Personal information
- Date of birth: 12 January 1985 (age 41)
- Place of birth: Auch, France
- Height: 1.70 m (5 ft 7 in)
- Positions: Winger; midfielder

Team information
- Current team: AS Valerguoise

Senior career*
Years	Team	Apps	(Gls)
2001–2006	Toulouse B		
2003–2006	Toulouse	16	(3)
2006	→ Sète (loan)		
2006–2007	Nîmes		
2007–2008	Boulogne	26	(2)
2008–2010	Arles-Avignon	12	(2)
2011–2014	Troyes	42	(6)
2013	→ Arles-Avignon (loan)	12	(0)
2014–2015	Arles-Avignon	16	(1)
2015–2018	Le Puy	58	(10)
2018	FU Narbonne		
2018–2021	Agde	42	(9)
2021–2022	Le Grau-du-Roi		
2022–2023	CO Castelnaudary		
2023–	AS Valerguoise		
- * Club domestic league appearances and goals as of 13:24, 26 January 2019 (UTC)

Benjamin Psaume (born 12 January 1985) is a French footballer who plays as a winger and midfielder for French club AS Valerguoise.

== Club career ==
Psaume signed for Troyes in January 2011 from Arles-Avignon, then in Ligue 1, and helped them avoid relegation in Ligue 2 that season. The following season, he helped them gain promotion to Ligue 1. He re-signed for Arles-Avignon in the 2012–13 season.
