= Sofiane Mahmoudi =

Footballer (born 2002)

Personal information
- Full name: Sofiane Mahmoudi
- Date of birth: 10 April 2002 (age 24)
- Place of birth: Saint-Germain-en-Laye, France
- Height: 1.85 m (6 ft 1 in)
- Position: Goalkeeper

Team information
- Current team: Tours
- Number: 23

Youth career
- 2018: Luynes Sport

Senior career*
Years	Team	Apps	(Gls)
2019–2022	Athlético Marseille	2	(0)
2022–2023	Stade Beaucairois	13	(0)
2023–	Tours	2	(0)
2023–2024	Tours II	12	(0)
2024-	Romorantin	2	(0)

International career^{‡}
2018	Algeria U17	2	(0)
- * Club domestic league appearances and goals as of 22 August 2023 ‡ National team caps and goals as of 4 January 2018

Sofiane Mahmoudi (born 10 April 2002) is a professional footballer who plays as a goalkeeper for Romorantin. Born in France, he has represented Algeria at youth level.

== Club career ==
=== Early career ===
Sofiane grew up and played for lower-league club Luynes Sport.

=== Athlético Marseille ===
On 2 July 2019, Mahmoudi joined Championnat National club Athlético Marseille on a four-year contract, following a successful pre-season trial.

=== Stade Beaucairois ===
After three seasons with Athlético Marseille, he joined Stade Stade Beaucairois on 1 August 2022.

=== Tours FC ===
In August 2023, Mahmoudi signed as third-choice goalkeeper for Tours FC, he was sent to Tours II in the Championnat National in search of playing time.

=== Romorantin ===
In July 2024, he signed with Romorantin.

== International career ==
A French and Algerian national, Sofiane chose to represent Algeria at the international level. He was called up to the Algeria U17 squad for an International Friendly match against Mauritania U17 in 2018.
