= Sébastien Gervais =

French footballer (born 1976)

Personal information
- Date of birth: December 2, 1976 (age 49)
- Place of birth: Bordeaux, France
- Height: 1.71 m (5 ft 7 1/2 in)
- Position: Midfielder

Senior career*
Years	Team	Apps	(Gls)
1995–1998	Nîmes Olympique	41	(5)
1998–1999	FC Villefranche		
1999–2007	FC Sète	238	(12)
2007–2011	RCO Agde		
- * Club domestic league appearances and goals as of 19:15, 24 November 2009 (UTC)

Sébastien Gervais (born December 2, 1976) is a French professional footballer who last played in the Championnat de France amateur for RCO Agde.

He played on the professional level in Ligue 2 for Nîmes Olympique and FC Sète.
