= Steve Haguy =

Guadeloupean footballer (born 1981)

Personal information
- Date of birth: 24 April 1981 (age 45)
- Place of birth: Paris, France
- Height: 1.77 m (5 ft 10 in)
- Position: Midfielder

Senior career*
Years	Team	Apps	(Gls)
1999–2000	US Clichy-sur-Seine		
2000–2001	Sèvres FC		
2001–2002	Levallois	26	(7)
2002–2003	Lorient	2	(0)
2003–2004	Romorantin	29	(5)
2004–2006	Cherbourg	51	(10)
2006–2008	Vannes	67	(10)
2008–2010	Laval	74	(10)
2010–2013	Nîmes	69	(10)
2013	Le Poiré-sur-Vie	13	(1)
2013–2014	Cherbourg	21	(2)
2014–2015	Jura Sud	27	(2)
2015–2016	Belfort	45	(4)
2017	CS Sedan Ardennes	14	(2)
2017–2018	Épinal	29	(2)
2018–2020	Bastia	29	(5)
2020	Vitré	4	(0)
2021–2022	Le Grau-du-Roi		

International career
2016	Guadeloupe	1	(0)
- * Club domestic league appearances and goals

Steve Haguy (born 24 April 1981) is a Guadeloupean professional footballer who plays as a midfielder. He has played for Ligue 2 clubs Laval and Nîmes.

== Club career ==
Born in Paris, Haguy was noticed by the staff of Ligue 2 side Lorient whilst playing for Championnat de France Amateur side Levallois. He subsequently signed an amateur contract with the club in the summer of 2002, hoping to make a breakthrough into the professional ranks. He made his Ligue 2 debut as a substitute in the 1–1 draw at AS Saint-Étienne on 4 September 2002. During his time at the club he also made a substitute appearance in the 2002–03 UEFA Cup, against Denizlispor in the first round, second leg.

After leaving Lorient at the end of the 2002–03 season, Haguy played the next five seasons for Championnat National clubs Romorantin, Cherbourg and Vannes. With Vannes he won the league and promotion to Ligue 2, but he was unexpectedly released by the club in the summer of 2008. He subsequently signed for Laval on a one-year deal, with the option of a professional deal if the club won promotion back to Ligue 2. Laval won promotion at the end of the 2008–09 season, and Haguy made his professional debut in the first game of the 2009–10 Ligue 2 season on 7 August 2009, against Brest. He scored his first professional goal in the 1–0 away win at SC Bastia on 28 August 2009.

Released at the end of his Laval contract, Haguy signed for Nîmes Olympique, after a trial, on 9 July 2010. He stayed two-and-a-half seasons with the club, suffering relegation from Ligue 2 and then winning the Championnat National the following season.

In January 2013 he signed for Le Poiré-sur-Vie in the Championnat National. At the end of the season, after a trial at Auxerre, he signed for a second time for Cherbourg, this time in Championnat de France Amateur. A season there was followed by a season with Jura Sud in 2014–15 at the same level, before Haguy returned the Championnat National with Belfort.

After a season-and-a-half with Belfort, Haguy left for CS Sedan Ardennes, who offered him a six-month contract with an option for a further year if the team remained in the Championnat National. Sedan were relegated and Haguy was released. In August 2017 he signed for Épinal in Championnat National 2.

== International career ==
Haguy made his international debut for Guadeloupe on 1 June 2016, in a qualifying game for the 2017 Caribbean Cup against Martinique.

== Honours ==
Nîmes

- Championnat National: 2007–08 (Vannes), 2011–12
