= Nicolas Benezet =

French footballer (born 1991)

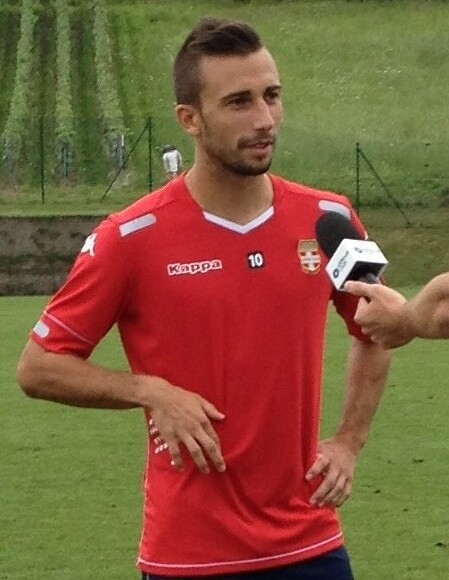
- Benezet being interviewed in 2014

Personal information
- Date of birth: 24 February 1991 (age 35)
- Place of birth: Montpellier, France
- Height: 1.70 m (5 ft 7 in)
- Position: Attacking midfielder

Youth career
- 1997–2004: Montpellier
- 2004–2010: Nîmes

Senior career*
Years	Team	Apps	(Gls)
2010–2013	Nîmes	90	(18)
2013–2015	Évian	40	(3)
2015	→ Caen (loan)	12	(4)
2015–2020	Guingamp	78	(11)
2019	→ Toronto FC (loan)	8	(2)
2020–2021	Colorado Rapids	22	(0)
2021	Seattle Sounders FC	13	(3)
2022–2023	Nîmes	21	(2)
2023	Le Grau-du-Roi		
2023	Karmiotissa	4	(0)
2023–2024	Le Grau-du-Roi		
2024–	Olympique Alès	0	(0)

International career^{‡}
2011	France U20	3	(2)
- * Club domestic league appearances and goals as of 22:36, 14 August 2024 (UTC) ‡ National team caps and goals as of 16 August 2014 (UTC)

Nicolas Benezet (born 24 February 1991) is a French professional footballer who plays as an attacking midfielder for Olympique Alès.

== Club career ==
=== France ===
Born in Montpellier, Benezet played in the youth academy of Montpellier before signing with Nîmes in 2004. He made his professional debut in the 2010–11 season on 15 October 2010 in a league match against Istres appearing as a substitute in a 0–0 draw. On 8 December 2010, he signed his first professional contract after agreeing to a three-year deal with Nîmes. Two days later, he rewarded Nîmes by scoring his first professional goal in a 3–2 victory over Istres in the Coupe de France. On 21 December, he scored his first professional league goal in a 2–0 win against Metz.

At the end of the 2012–13 season, top-flight clubs Sochaux and Évian showed interest in signing him and in July 2013, Benezet joined Evian.

On 3 July 2015, Benezet signed for Guingamp.

=== Major League Soccer ===
In July 2019, following Guingamp's relegation from Ligue 1, Benezet joined Major League Soccer club Toronto FC on loan for the remainder of their season, with the club holding an option to make the transfer permanent at the conclusion of the loan, which would be triggered automatically if he started six regular season matches (he ultimately started five). Toronto chose not to acquire him permanently after the loan due to a lack of salary cap space after the re-signing of Michael Bradley.

In January, Benezet returned to MLS, signing with Colorado Rapids, who paid a $500,000 transfer fee to Guingamp for him, after acquiring his MLS rights from Toronto in a trade. He made his Rapids debut on 12 July against Real Salt Lake at the MLS is Back Tournament. He earned his first assist in Burgundy on Kellyn Acosta's opening goal against Sporting Kansas City on 17 July. Benezet finished the season with three assists among 13 appearances, including Colorado's first-round playoff loss at Minnesota United FC.

On 5 August 2021, Benezet was traded to Seattle Sounders FC for $50,000 in general allocation money. He was signed through the end of the 2021 season, with an option for the 2022 season, primarily to provide depth for the team. Benezet made his Sounders debut on 15 August in a 6–2 victory against the Portland Timbers, entering the match as a substitute and scoring in stoppage time. Following the 2021 season, Seattle declined their contract option on Benezet.

=== Return to France and spell in Cyprus ===
In June 2022, Benezet returned to Nîmes and signed a one-year contract with the option to extend for three more seasons.

In August 2023, Benezet signed for Régional 1 club Le Grau-du-Roi in order to train with the team while waiting for an offer from a professional club. In late September, he signed a contract with Cypriot club Karmiotissa until the end of the season. However, he terminated his contract with the club in early November, returning to Le Grau-du-Roi until the end of the season.

On 30 August 2024, Benezet joined Championnat National 3 side Olympique Alès.

== Personal life ==
Benezet is a noted fan of anime and manga, particularly Dragon Ball Z and One Piece.

Benezet became a father in late 2023. At that time, his wife's family resided in Le Grau-du-Roi.

== Career statistics ==
As of 5 August 2021

Appearances and goals by club, season and competition
Club	Season	League			National cup (Note: Includes Coupe de France, Coupe de la Ligue, Trophée des Champions, Canadian Championship)		Playoffs (Note: Includes MLS Cup Playoffs)		Total	
Club	Season	Division	Apps	Goals	Apps	Goals	Apps	Goals	Apps	Goals
Nîmes	2010–11	Ligue 2	23	2	3	1	—		26	3
Nîmes	2011–12	Championnat National	34	7	0	0	—		34	7
Nîmes	2012–13	Ligue 2	33	9	3	0	—		36	9
Nîmes	Total		90	18	6	1	—		96	19
Évian	2013–14	Ligue 1	29	3	1	0	—		30	3
Évian	2014–15	Ligue 1	11	0	1	0	—		12	7
Évian	Total		40	3	2	0	—		42	3
Caen (loan)	2014–15	Ligue 1	12	4	0	0	—		12	4
Guingamp	2015–16	Ligue 1	19	4	2	0	—		21	4
Guingamp	2016–17	Ligue 1	5	1	2	1	—		7	2
Guingamp	2017–18	Ligue 1	29	3	1	0	—		30	3
Guingamp	2018–19	Ligue 1	25	3	3	0	—		28	3
Guingamp	Total		78	11	8	1	—		86	13
Toronto FC (loan)	2019	Major League Soccer	8	2	1	0	4	1	13	3
Colorado Rapids	2020	Major League Soccer	12	0	—		1	0	13	0
Colorado Rapids	2021	Major League Soccer	11	0	—		—		11	0
Colorado Rapids	Total		23	0	0	0	1	0	24	0
Career total			163	25	17	2	5	1	185	28

== Honours ==
Guingamp

- Coupe de la Ligue runner-up: 2018–19
