= ES Grau-du-Roi =

Football club in Le Grau-du-Roi, France

Le Grau-du-Roi
- Full name: Émulation Sportive du Grau-du-Roi
- Short name: ESGDR
- Founded: 1935
- Stadium: Stade Michel Mézy
- Capacity: 3,500
- President: Grégory Mézy
- Manager: Sébastien Pérédes; Morgan Marion
- League: Régional 1 Occitanie; Group A
- 2022–23: Régional 2 Occitanie, 1st (promoted)
- Website: https://esgdr.fr/

Émulation Sportive du Grau-du-Roi is a football club located in Le Grau-du-Roi, France. They play in the Régional 1, the sixth tier of French football. The club's colours are yellow and blue.

== History ==
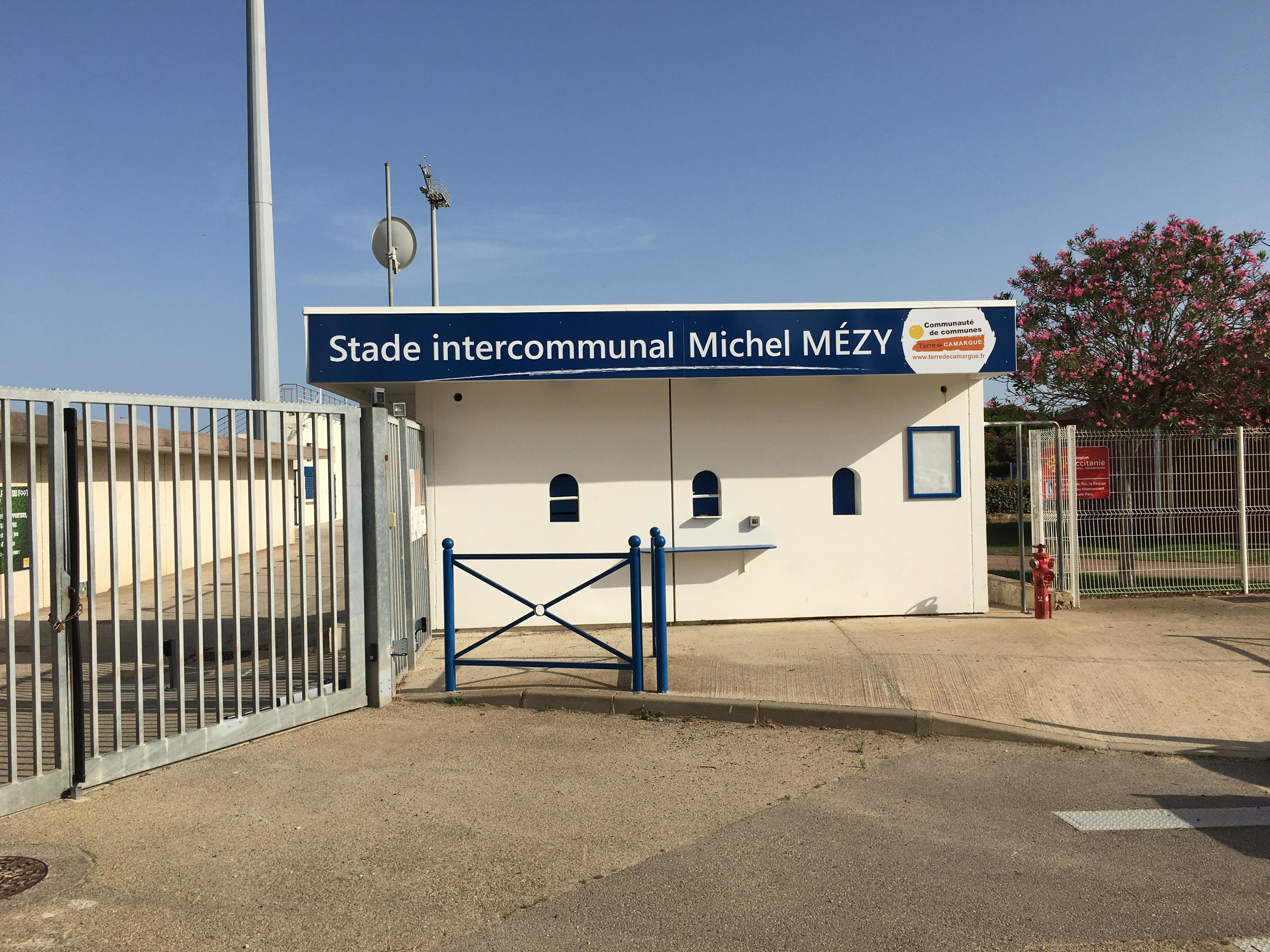
ES Grau-du-Roi's home ground, the Stade Michel Mézy

ES Grau-du-Roi was founded in 1935. The highest tier the club has played in is the Division 4, which they reached in the 1992–93 season. However, after 1993, the Division 4 became the National 3. Since 1993, the club has played in two separate seasons of the National 3. One of those was the 1996–97 season, as they had won the Division d'Honneur of Languedoc-Roussillon in the season prior.

The furthest round the club has reached in the Coupe de France is the round of 64, which they did in the 1997–98 season, losing to Istres on penalties.

In 2017, ES Grau-du-Roi was in a bad financial situation. The former president of the club Michel Mézy gave the club eleven match-worn and signed shirts from professional footballers (such as Neymar, Zidane, and Griezmann) to be sold in order to raise money for saving the club. From 2018 to 2023, the club gained successive promotions to go from the tenth tier, the Départemental 2, to the sixth tier, the Régional 1.

== Honours ==
ES Grau-du-Roi honours
Honours	No.	Years
Division d'Honneur Languedoc-Roussillon	1	1995–96
Départemental 2 Occitanie, Gard-Lozère Group B	1	2018–19
Départemental 1 Occitanie, Gard-Lozère	1	2019–20
Régional 3 Occitanie	2	2020–21, (Note: Not promoted due to the COVID-19 pandemic) 2021–22
Régional 2 Occitanie	1	2022–23

== Notable players ==
- (France) Mansour Assoumani
- (France) Stéphane Belhomme
- (France) Nicolas Benezet
- (Guadeloupe) Steve Haguy
- (France) Cyril Jeunechamp
- (Ivory Coast) Seydou Koné
- (France) Jérôme Palatsi
- (France) Benjamin Psaume
- (France) Christian Sarramagna
