= AS Fabrègues =

Football club in Fabrègues, France

Fabrègues
- Full name: Association Sportive Fabrègues
- Nicknames: Sang et Or (Blood and Gold)
- Founded: 1935
- Stadium: Stade Joseph Jeanton
- Capacity: 2,500
- President: Laurent Fougerolle
- Managers: Laurent Scala; Jean-Luc Muzet
- League: Régional 1 Occitanie
- 2021–22: National 3 Group H, 14th (relegated)
- Website: https://www.asfabregues.fr/

Association Sportive Fabrègues is a football club located in Fabrègues, France. They play in the sixth tier of French football. The club's colours are red and yellow.

== History ==
AS Fabrègues was founded in 1935. The first time the club reached the national level was in 2014; they had become champions of the Division d'Honneur in Languedoc-Roussillon in the 2013–14 season. They were subsequently promoted to the Championnat de France Amateur 2, now known as the Championnat National 3. After eight seasons at this level, they were relegated back to the Régional 1 in 2022, finishing bottom of their group.

AS Fabrègues has reached the round of 64 of the Coupe de France on several occasions.

== Stadium ==
The club is a resident of the Stade Joseph Jeanton in Fabrègues, but can also play at the Stade Robert Carles in the town.

== Honours ==
AS Fabrègues honours
Honours	No.	Years
Coupe d'Occitanie	2	2011–12, 2012–13
Coupe de l'Hérault	2	2011–12, 2012–13
Division d'Honneur Languedoc-Roussillon	1	2013–14
