= RCO Agde =

French football club

- Full name: Racing Club Olympique Agathois
- Founded: 1999
- Ground: Stade Louis Sanguin
- Capacity: 3,500
- Chairman: Laurent Brugirard
- Manager: Philippe Viguier
- League: National 3 Group A
- 2022–23: National 3 Group H, 6th
Home colours	Away colours

RCO Agde (French: Racing Club Olympique Agathois) is a French football club. The club is based at the 3500-seat Stade Louis Sanguin in Agde.

== History ==
RCO Agde was created in 1999 from the merger of Racing Club Agathois (founded 1904) and Football Olympique Agathois. As of the 2019–20 season, the club's senior team plays in the Championnat National 3. The club colours are red and black.

== Honours ==
- DH Languedoc Group: 1991
- DH Mediterranean Group runners-up: 1950, 1972
