= Stade Beaucairois FC =

Association football club in France

Stade Beaucairois
- Full name: Stade Beaucairois Football Club
- Founded: 1908; 117 years ago (as Stade Beaucairois)
- Ground: Stade Philibert Schneider
- League: National 3 Group A
- 2022–23: National 3 Group H, 3rd
- Website: https://stadebeaucairois30.footeo.com

Stade Beaucairois Football Club is a football club based in Beaucaire, Languedoc-Roussillon, France. It currently plays in the Championnat National 3.

== History ==
The club was founded in 1908 as Stade Beaucairois.

In 2023, Stade Beaucairois 30 merged with Espoir Football Club Beaucarois to form Stade Beaucarois FC.
