= 2022–23 Coupe de France preliminary rounds, Normandy =

The 2022–23 Coupe de France preliminary rounds, Normandy is the qualifying competition to decide which teams from the leagues of the Normandy region of France take part in the main competition from the seventh round.

A total of eight teams will qualify from the Normandy preliminary rounds.

In 2021–22, all the qualifying teams except Évreux FC 27 were knocked out in the seventh round. Évreux were knocked out in a penalty shootout by ESA Linas-Montlhéry in the eighth round.

== Draws and fixtures ==
On 18 July 2022, the league announced that 392 teams had entered from the region. On the same day, the first round draw was published, with 320 teams from the régional and district divisions involved, and 54 exempted to the second round. The second round draw was published on 23 August 2022.

The third round draw was published on 31 August 2022, and saw the eleven teams from Championnat National 3 enter the competition. The fourth round draw was made live on the leagues Facebook page on 13 September 2022, and saw the three teams from Championnat National 2 enter the competition.

The fifth round draw was made live on the leagues Facebook page on 28 September 2022, and saw the only team in the region from the Championnat National enter the competition. The sixth round draw was also made on the leagues Facebook page, on 11 October 2022.

=== First round ===
These matches were played on 19, 20 and 21 August 2022.

First round results: Normandy
Tie no	Home team (tier)	Score	Away team (tier)
1.	CA Pontois (9)	2–2 (4–2 p)	Condé Sports (8)
2.	AS Bérigny-Cerisy (10)	2–0	FC Agon-Coutainville (8)
3.	Claies de Viré FC (12)	1–1 (5–4 p)	FC Saint-Jean-de-Daye (12)
4.	US Sainte-Croix Saint-Lô (8)	1–6	FC des Etangs (8)
5.	ES Trelly Quettreville Contrières (11)	2–1 (Note: Tie reversed from original draw.)	ES Munevillaise (11)
6.	FC de l'Elle (9)	1–7	Tessy-Moyon Sports (8)
7.	US Semilly Saint-André (11)	3–0 (Note: Tie won by means of forfeit.)	Avenir Hambye (10)
8.	FC 3 Rivières (8)	5–4	Créances SF (8)
9.	US Percy (9)	1–1 (4–3 p)	ES Saint-Sauveur-La Ronde-Haye (8)
10.	Périers SF (11)	5–1	ES des Marais (11)
11.	ES Le Dézert (11)	0–6	AS Thèreval (9)
12.	US Roncey Cerisy (10)	1–0	ES Gouville-sur-Mer (9)
13.	Entente Le Lorey-Hauteville-Feugères (11)	0–0 (5–2 p)	AS Guilberville (10)
14.	US Lessay (10)	2–3	AS Montebourg (10)
15.	ÉR Mesnil-au-Val (11)	2–1	ES Quettetot-Rauville (11)
16.	Marcey-les-Grèves FC (11)	1–12	US Saint-Martin Saint-Jean-de-la Haize (10)
17.	US Pontorson (10)	2–1	Saint-Hilaire-Virey-Landelles (8)
18.	FC Val Saint-Père (9)	3–0	Patriote Saint-Jamaise (8)
19.	AS Jullouville-Sartilly (8)	2–0	Espérance Saint-Jean-des-Champs (8)
20.	ES Tirepied (11)	0–3	FC Sienne (11)
21.	ASC Tertre (12)	3–3 (3–4 p)	US Gavray (11)
22.	US Sainte-Cécile (11)	3–0	USCO Sourdeval (9)
23.	USM Donville (9)	1–5	CS Villedieu (8)
24.	US Saint-Quentin-sur-le-Homme (9)	2–0	AS Brécey (9)
25.	AS Cérencaise (10)	3–0	La Bréhalaise FC (10)
26.	ES Plain (9)	0–0 (4–3 p)	ES Pointe Hague (8)
27.	FC Bretteville-en-Saire (12)	1–2	US Vasteville-Acqueville (10)
28.	AS Pointe Cotentin (10)	2–4	FC Brix Sottevast Saint-Joseph (10)
29.	ES Héauville-Siouville (11)	0–3	Amont-Quentin FC (11)
30.	AS Querqueville (8)	1–2	FC Val de Saire (8)
31.	FC Digosville (10)	1–2	AS Gréville-Hague (10)
32.	Bricqueboscq-Saint-Christophe-Grosville Sport (11)	2–0	CS Barfleur (11)
33.	ASS Urville-Nacqueville (10)	3–1	SM Haytillon (10)
34.	US Pierreville Saint-Germain-le-Gaillard (11)	0–4	PL Octeville (10)
35.	SCU Douve Divette (9)	0–2	UC Bricquebec (8)
36.	US La Glacerie (9)	0–5	US Côte des Iles (8)
37.	US Mortagnaise (8)	7–1	US Theilloise (9)
38.	Soligny-Aspres-Moulins Football (10)	0–4	AS Gacé (9)
39.	Hauts du Perche FC (12)	1–0	La Vedette du Boisthorel (10)
40.	US Mêloise (9)	0–5	FC Pays Aiglon (7)
41.	Football Club Pays Bellêmois (11)	1–0	ES Pays d'Ouche (11)
42.	SS Domfrontaise (8)	2–2 (4–3 p)	OC Briouze (8)
43.	AS Monts d'Andaine (9)	0–0 (2–4 p)	SL Petruvien (10)
44.	SC Damigny (11)	0–6	AM La Ferrière-aux-Etangs (9)
45.	FC Écouché (9)	0–3	US Athis (9)
46.	Sées FC (11)	0–2	AS La Selle-la-Forge (8)
47.	AS Aubusson (11)	2–2 (5–4 p)	AS Passais-Saint-Fraimbault (9)
48.	JS Tinchebray (9)	1–2	AS Sarceaux Espoir (9)
49.	CO Ceaucé (9)	0–0 (13–12 p)	Leopards Saint-Georges (8)
50.	FC Landais (10)	0–4	US Andaine (8)
51.	FL Ségrie-Fontaine (10)	0–5	Avenir Messei (8)
52.	AS Berd'huis Foot (8)	3–4	Espérance Condé-sur-Sarthe (8)
53.	Olympique Alençonnais (11)	1–2	ES Écouves (9)
54.	AS Courteille Alençon (8)	3–0	Vimoutiers FC (9)
55.	Amicale Chailloué (10)	3–3 (4–1 p)	Iton FC (10)
56.	ES Tronquay (11)	2–2 (4–3 p)	US Guérinière (8)
57.	AS La Hoguette (11)	1–3	AF Basly (11)
58.	USI La Graverie (11)	0–4	AS Cahagnes (10)
59.	UA Saint-Sever (10)	0–4	US Villers-Bocage (7)
60.	ASL Chemin Vert (10)	3–2	Inter Odon FC (9)
61.	FC Mouen (11)	4–1	ES Portaise (9)
62.	IS Caumontaise (12)	0–1	Fontenay-le-Pesnel FC (11)
63.	Lystrienne Sportive (9)	2–0	ES Thury-Harcourt (8)
64.	US Tilly-sur-Seulles (10)	1–7	AS Potigny-Villers-Canivet-Ussy (8)
65.	FC Langrune-Luc (12)	2–2 (2–4 p)	Croissanville FC (11)
66.	FC Louvigny (11)	2–2 (4–3 p)	ES Sannerville-Touffréville (10)
67.	FC Vital (10)	1–4	FC Troarn (8)
68.	CL Colombellois (10)	1–1 (5–3 p)	AJS Ouistreham (8)
69.	AS Vaudry-Truttemer (9)	2–6	FC Thaon-Bretteville-Le Fresne (8)
70.	Football Mixte Condé-en-Normandie (10)	0–2	ES Carpiquet (9)
71.	AS Giberville (10)	4–2	MSL Garcelles-Secqueville (10)
72.	US Authie (10)	4–1	FC Moyaux (10)
73.	ES Saint Aubinaise (11)	1–2	ES Cormelles (9)
74.	Cingal FC (9)	1–1 (8–9 p)	AS Biéville-Beuville (10)
75.	AS Saint-Cyr-Fervaques (10)	0–3	US Pont-l'Évêque (9)
76.	AS Saint-Désir (9)	2–2 (13–12 p)	Réveil Saint-Germain Courseulles-sur-Mer (9)
77.	Cresserons-Hermanville-Lion Terre et Mer (10)	1–1 (9–8 p)	FC Baie de l'Orne (9)
78.	ES Courtonnaise (11)	1–5	ES Livarotaise (9)
79.	ASF Grentheville (11)	1–2	Muance FC (8)
80.	ES Bonnebosq (10)	0–2	Stade Saint-Sauveurais (8)
81.	AS Glos (12)	0–6	EF Touques-Saint-Gratien (10)
82.	US Villerville (10)	0–10	CS Honfleur (8)
83.	Dozulé FC (9)	1–0	CS Orbecquois-Vespèrois (9)
84.	FC Baventais (11)	0–2	FC Caen Sud Ouest (9)
85.	FC Laurentais Boulon (11)	0–1	USM Blainvillaise (8)
86.	ESI Vallée de l'Orne (10)	1–4	US Aunay-sur-Odon (8)
87.	US Maisons (11)	0–5	Hastings FC Rots Cheux Saint-Manvieu Norrey (8)
88.	JS Audrieu (9)	3–0	AS Saint-Vigor-le-Grand (8)
89.	Grainville-sur-Odon FC (11)	0–6	USI Bessin Nord (8)
90.	Olympia'caux FC (8)	4–0	FC Rolleville (9)
91.	AS Montivilliers (8)	10–0	US Sennevillaise (9)
92.	US Lillebonne (8)	5–1	SS Gournay (8)
93.	US Godervillais (8)	3–1	AS Sainte-Adresse But (9)
94.	US des Falaises (10)	0–0 (4–2 p)	Saint-Romain AC (8)
95.	US Envermeu (10)	0–6	AS Tréport (9)
96.	US Crielloise (10)	0–1	FC Petit Caux (9)
97.	US Londinières (10)	0–1	US Bacqueville-Pierreville (9)
98.	ES Arques (9)	1–3	US Normande 76 (9)
99.	FC Bréauté-Bretteville (10)	1–2	US Auffay (8)
100.	USF Fécamp (8)	2–4	Olympique Havrais Tréfileries-Neiges (8)
101.	FC Neufchâtel (8)	3–2	Entente Vienne et Saâne (8)
102.	CA Longuevillais (9)	1–1 (3–1 p)	US Doudeville (9)
103.	JS Saint-Léonard 76 (12)	0–7	CA Harfleur Beaulieu (11)
104.	US Saint-Thomas (12)	1–1 (2–4 p)	ASL Ramponneau (11)
105.	Belleville FC (10)	0–1	RC Havrais (8)
106.	US Épouville (8)	0–2	Entente Motteville/Croix-Mare (8)
107.	ESI Saint-Antoine (10)	1–1 (5–4 p)	US Sainte-Marie-des-Champs (12)
108.	US Héricourt-en-Caux (10)	0–4	JS Saint-Nicolas-d'Aliermont-Béthune (8)
109.	Caux FC (10)	1–2	CS Gravenchon (8)
110.	ES Montigny La Vaupalière (12)	4–0	US Saint-Martin-Osmonville (12)
111.	US Forêt de Roumare (11)	12–0	AS Saint-Pierre-de-Varengeville (9)
112.	ASPTT Rouen (10)	2–0	Boucle de Seine (10)
113.	FC Nord Ouest (10)	1–3	Canteleu FC (11)
114.	US Saint-Jean-du-Cardonnay-Fresquiennes (10)	1–1 (4–5 p)	Rouen AC (10)
115.	AS La Bouille Moulineaux (10)	2–7	Plateau de Quincampoix FC (8)
116.	AS Buchy (9)	2–0	AS Madrillet Château Blanc (8)
117.	ASC Jiyan Kurdistan (9)	4–1	GCO Bihorel (8)
118.	FC Tourville-La-Rivière (9)	3–1	AS Canton d'Argueil (8)
119.	AS Mesnières (10)	0–3	AS Gournay-en-Bray (8)
120.	Olympique Darnétal (9)	3–1	Stade Grand-Quevilly (8)
121.	US Grammont (9)	4–1 (Note: US Grammont penalised for fielding a suspended player, Mont-Saint-Aignan FC qualify.)	Mont-Saint-Aignan FC (8)
122.	FC Pays du Neubourg (8)	1–4	FC Saint-Étienne-du-Rouvray (7)
123.	FC Fréville-Bouville SIVOM (10)	1–4	Saint-Aubin FC (8)
124.	FC Anneville-Manéhouville-Crosville (9)	0–4	Cany FC (8)
125.	FC Pontois (12)	0–3	AS Sassetot-Thérouldeville (9)
126.	Yerville FC (10)	0–3	FC Biville-la-Baignarde (10)
127.	AS Vallée du Dun (10)	1–6	FC Limésy (10)
128.	ES Janval (10)	0–0 (1–4 p)	GS Saint-Aubin Saint-Vigor (10)
129.	RC Normand (11)	1–4	Stade Valeriquais (9)
130.	Amicale Malaunay (9)	1–4	FC Barentinois (8)
131.	AS Fauvillaise (8)	1–2	ES Plateau-Foucarmont-Réalcamp (7)
132.	Eu FC (8)	3–1	Neuville AC (8)
133.	AS Ourville (8)	2–2 (4–5 p)	FC Offranville (8)
134.	FC Tôtes (8)	1–0	AJC Bosc-le-Hard (8)
135.	US Grèges (10)	2–2 (2–0 p)	AS Ouvillaise (9)
136.	AS Angerville-l'Orcher (10)	0–8	Le Havre FC 2012 (9)
137.	FC Gruchet-le-Valasse (10)	2–2 (3–4 p)	Gainneville AC (9)
138.	FC Madrie (11)	1–3	ES Vexin Ouest (11)
139.	US Louviers (11)	2–1	RC Malherbe Surville (11)
140.	SC Thiberville (9)	2–0	FC Garennes-Bueil-La Couture-Breuilpont (8)
141.	La Croix Vallée d'Eure (10)	0–1	US Gasny (8)
142.	US Cormeilles-Lieurey (10)	0–2	FAC Alizay (8)
143.	FC Prey (10)	0–1	FC Illiers-l'Évêque (8)
144.	FCI Bel Air (9)	1–3	FC Eure Madrie Seine (8)
145.	FC Roumois Nord (10)	1–2	CS Beaumont-le-Roger (8)
146.	AS Andréseinne (9)	0–0 (4–5 p)	FC Serquigny-Nassandres (8)
147.	FC Brionne (12)	2–7	AS Vesly (10)
148.	FC Val de Risle (10)	0–0 (3–1 p)	FA Roumois (9)
149.	JS Arnières-sur-Iton (12)	1–6	US Gravigny (10)
150.	FC Hennezis Vexin Sud (10)	0–0 (3–2 p)	ES Angerville/Baux-Ste Croix/Plessis-Grohan/Ventes (10)
151.	Stade Vernolien (9)	4–0	SC Bernay (8)
152.	AS Ailly-Fontaine-Bellenger (10)	1–4	AS Courcelles (8)
153.	US Conches (8)	5–1	FC Seine-Eure (8)
154.	US Saint-Germain-la-Campagne (10)	1–7	CA Pont-Audemer (8)
155.	AS Routot (11)	2–2 (4–3 p)	US Étrépagny (10)
156.	RC Muids-Daubeuf-Vauvray (11)	3–2	FC Ézy-sur-Eure (11)
157.	FC Avrais Nonancourt (10)	0–2	ES Vallée de l'Oison (8)
158.	AS Valée de l'Andelle (11)	1–6	Charleval FC (10)
159.	CS Andelys (9)	3–3 (4–5 p)	US Rugles-Lyre (9)
160.	US Barroise (11)	2–1	CS Bonneville (10)

=== Second round ===
These matches were played on 27 and 28 August 2022.

Second round results: Normandy
Tie no	Home team (tier)	Score	Away team (tier)
1.	Tessy-Moyon Sports (8)	2–2 (4–3 p)	FC Val Saint-Père (9)
2.	FC Sienne (11)	1–5	CS Villedieu (8)
3.	ES Trelly Quettreville Contrières (11)	0–14	ES Coutances (7)
4.	AS Cerencaise (10)	0–1	US Saint-Pairaise (7)
5.	US Sainte-Cécile (11)	0–4	US Ducey-Isigny (7)
6.	US Saint-Martin Saint-Jean-de-la Haize (10)	6–1	US Percy (9)
7.	US Pontorson (10)	0–1	AS Jullouville-Sartilly (8)
8.	US Gavray (11)	1–0	US Saint-Quentin-sur-le-Homme (9)
9.	AS Bérigny-Cerisy (10)	1–2	FC Équeurdreville-Hainneville (6)
10.	US Roncey Cerisy (10)	1–2	FC 3 Rivières (8)
11.	CA Pontois (9)	2–4	Agneaux FC (7)
12.	ASS Urville-Nacqueville (10)	1–1 (4–2 p)	AS Valognes (7)
13.	Entente Le Lorey-Hauteville-Feugères (11)	4–1	Bricqueboscq-Saint-Christophe-Grosville Sport (11)
14.	FC Brix Sottevast Saint-Joseph (10)	0–1	ES Plain (9)
15.	Lystrienne Sportive (9)	0–4	AS Tourlaville (6)
16.	Périers SF (11)	1–4 (Note: CS Carentan penalised, Périers SF qualify.)	CS Carentan (7)
17.	FC Val de Saire (8)	4–0	US Ouest Cotentin (7)
18.	Claies de Viré FC (12)	0–3 (Note: Tie won by means of forfeit.)	US Vasteville-Acqueville (10)
19.	AS Montebourg (10)	1–5	US Côte des Iles (8)
20.	ÉR Mesnil-au-Val (11)	2–4	AS Thèreval (9)
21.	PL Octeville (10)	5–0	US Semilly Saint-André (11)
22.	AS Gréville-Hague (10)	0–3	FC des Etangs (8)
23.	Amont-Quentin FC (11)	0–9	UC Bricquebec (8)
24.	AS Gacé (9)	1–0 (Note: Tie reversed from original draw.)	Hauts du Perche FC (12)
25.	Amicale Chailloué (10)	1–3	AS Courteille Alençon (8)
26.	Espérance Condé-sur-Sarthe (8)	0–1	FC Argentan (6)
27.	ES Écouves (9)	0–2	FC Pays Aiglon (7)
28.	Football Club Pays Bellêmois (11)	1–2	US Mortagnaise (8)
29.	AM La Ferrière-aux-Etangs (9)	2–1	SS Domfrontaise (8)
30.	US Athis (9)	1–1 (5–4 p)	CO Ceaucé (9)
31.	AS Sarceaux Espoir (9)	1–2	Jeunesse Fertoise Bagnoles (7)
32.	Avenir Messei (8)	1–5	AS La Selle-la-Forge (8)
33.	SL Petruvien (10)	0–5	US Andaine (8)
34.	AS Aubusson (11)	0–6	FC Flers (6)
35.	JS Audrieu (9)	1–1 (4–3 p)	LC Bretteville-sur-Odon (7)
36.	JS Douvres (7)	8–0	AS Cahagnes (10)
37.	FC Caen Sud Ouest (9)	0–1	FC Thaon-Bretteville-Le Fresne (8)
38.	Fontenay-le-Pesnel FC (11)	0–5	ES Carpiquet (9)
39.	Hastings FC Rots Cheux Saint-Manvieu Norrey (8)	0–4	Bayeux FC (6)
40.	US Villers-Bocage (7)	3–1	Maladrerie OS (6)
41.	USI Bessin Nord (8)	0–3	AS Verson (6)
42.	AF Basly (11)	1–2	US Aunay-sur-Odon (8)
43.	FC Mouen (11)	2–1	ES Tronquay (11))
44.	FC Louvigny (11)	0–4	ASL Chemin Vert (10)
45.	Muance FC (8)	0–6	ASPTT Caen (6)
46.	Bourguébus-Soliers FC (7)	0–2	AS Villers Houlgate Côte Fleurie' (6)
47.	AS Potigny-Villers-Canivet-Ussy (8)	1–0	AS Saint-Désir (9)
48.	ESFC Falaise (7)	1–1 (7–6 p)	USON Mondeville (6)
49.	EF Touques-Saint-Gratien (10)	0–3	Cresserons-Hermanville-Lion Terre et Mer (10)
50.	AS Biéville-Beuville (10)	1–1 (3–2 p)	Stade Saint-Sauveurais (8)
51.	FC Troarn (8)	1–5	CS Honfleur (8)
52.	US Authie (10)	2–6	AS Ifs (7)
53.	AS Giberville (10)	0–3	CA Lisieux Pays d'Auge (7)
54.	US Pont-l'Évêque (9)	5–1	Dozulé FC (9)
55.	USM Blainvillaise (8)	2–2 (4–2 p)	USC Mézidon (7)
56.	CL Colombellois (10)	1–1 (4–2 p)	AS Trouville-Deauville (6)
57.	ES Cormelles (9)	1–1 (4–3 p)	SC Hérouvillais (7)
58.	Croissanville FC (11)	0–4	ES Livarotaise (9)
59.	Olympia'caux FC (8)	0–0 (3–5 p)	US Godervillais (8)
60.	Olympique Havrais Tréfileries-Neiges (8)	2–3	AS Montivilliers (8)
61.	US Lillebonne (8)	2–0	CS Gravenchon (8)
62.	US Bolbec (7)	0–0 (4–3 p)	Yvetot AC (6)
63.	RC Havrais (8)	1–4	CSSM Le Havre (6)
64.	ASL Ramponneau (11)	1–1 (1–4 p)	ESI Saint-Antoine (10)
65.	Gainneville AC (9)	1–1 (4–3 p)	US des Falaises (10)
66.	SC Frileuse (7)	0–0 (2–4 p)	SC Octevillais (7)
67.	Le Havre FC 2012 (9)	0–1	Le Havre Caucriauville Sportif (7)
68.	ES Plateau-Foucarmont-Réalcamp (7)	1–1 (4–5 p)	Eu FC (8)
69.	Olympique Pavillais (7)	4–2	Cany FC (8)
70.	US Auffay (8)	0–1	FC Barentinois (8)
71.	Entente Motteville/Croix-Mare (8)	2–5	JS Saint-Nicolas-d'Aliermont-Béthune (8)
72.	CA Harfleur Beaulieu (11)	3–1	GS Saint-Aubin Saint-Vigor (10)
73.	US Mesnil-Esnard/Franqueville (6)	2–1	Rouen Sapins FC Grand-Mare (7)
74.	Canteleu FC (11)	1–2	Caudebec-Saint-Pierre FC (7)
75.	AS Buchy (9)	0–1	FC Neufchâtel (8)
76.	FC Petit Caux (9)	1–2	FC Tôtes (8)
77.	US Bacqueville-Pierreville (9)	0–2	FC Offranville (8)
78.	US Forêt de Roumare (11)	0–5	Saint-Aubin FC (8)
79.	Olympique Darnétal (9)	2–0	FC Tourville-La-Rivière (9)
80.	US Louviers (11)	0–4	CO Cléon (7)
81.	ASC Jiyan Kurdistan (9)	4–2 (Note: ASC Jiyan Kurdistan penalised, FC Le Trait-Duclair qualify.)	FC Le Trait-Duclair (7)
82.	FUSC Bois-Guillaume (7)	0–0 (4–3 p)	Amicale Houlmoise Bondevillaise FC (7)
83.	ES Montigny La Vaupalière (12)	1–2	Rouen AC (10)
84.	Plateau de Quincampoix FC (8)	1–4	Stade Sottevillais CC (6)
85.	ASPTT Rouen (10)	0–3	FC Saint-Étienne-du-Rouvray (7)
86.	FC Saint-Julien Petit Quevilly (7)	2–0	AL Déville-Maromme (7)
87.	AS Gournay-en-Bray (8)	3–0	Mont-Saint-Aignan FC (8)
88.	AS Tréport (9)	2–0	CA Longuevillais (9)
89.	Stade Valeriquais (9)	2–4	US Grèges (10)
90.	US Normande 76 (9)	0–3	US Luneraysienne (6)
91.	FC Biville-la-Baignarde (10)	0–2	ES Tourville (7)
92.	FC Limésy (10)	1–1 (4–5 p)	AS Sassetot-Thérouldeville (9)
93.	US Rugles-Lyre (9)	0–1	FC Illiers-l'Évêque (8)
94.	AS Routot (11)	1–11	Pacy Ménilles RC (6)
95.	ES Vexin Ouest (11)	1–5	Stade Porte Normande Vernon (7)
96.	US Conches (8)	– (Note: FC Val de Reuil penalised, US Conches qualify. Original scoreline unknown.)	FC Val de Reuil (6)
97.	RC Muids-Daubeuf-Vauvray (11)	0–6	CA Pont-Audemer (8)
98.	AS Vesly (10)	0–4	Saint-Sébastien Foot (7)
99.	FC Hennezis Vexin Sud (10)	2–4	FC Gisors Vexin Normand (6)
100.	US Barroise (11)	1–1 (3–1 p)	ES Vallée de l'Oison (8)
101.	ES Normanville (7)	2–1	FC Eure Madrie Seine (8)
102.	Saint Marcel Foot (7)	1–0	AS Courcelles (8)
103.	US Gasny (8)	0–2	Romilly Pont-Saint-Pierre FC (6)
104.	FC Val de Risle (10)	0–6	CS Beaumont-le-Roger (8)
105.	FC Serquigny-Nassandres (8)	3–1	Stade Vernolien (9)
106.	US Gravigny (10)	2–1	SC Thiberville (9)
107.	Charleval FC (10)	1–0	FAC Alizay (8)

=== Third round ===
These matches were played on 10 and 11 September 2022.

Third round results: Normandy
Tie no	Home team (tier)	Score	Away team (tier)
1.	Entente Le Lorey-Hauteville-Feugères (11)	1–2	FC Mouen (11)
2.	Périers SF (11)	0–6	FC des Etangs (8)
3.	ASS Urville-Nacqueville (10)	0–5	Bayeux FC (6)
4.	FC 3 Rivières (8)	2–2 (5–4 p)	FC Équeurdreville-Hainneville (6)
5.	US Côte des Iles (8)	3–0	USM Blainvillaise (8)
6.	ES Cormelles (9)	1–4	AG Caennaise (5)
7.	AS Thèreval (9)	1–1 (6–5 p)	Agneaux FC (7)
8.	PL Octeville (10)	1–1 (5–4 p)	UC Bricquebec (8)
9.	ES Coutances (7)	0–2	FC Saint-Lô Manche (5)
10.	AS Biéville-Beuville (10)	1–2	FC Val de Saire (8)
11.	ES Plain (9)	0–3	AS Tourlaville (6)
12.	Tessy-Moyon Sports (8)	0–6	AS Cherbourg Football (5)
13.	US Vasteville-Acqueville (10)	0–6	JS Douvres (7)
14.	FC Thaon-Bretteville-Le Fresne (8)	5–0	ES Carpiquet (9)
15.	Cresserons-Hermanville-Lion Terre et Mer (10)	1–1 (2–4 p)	JS Audrieu (9)
16.	ES Livarotaise (9)	1–2	AS Jullouville-Sartilly (8)
17.	US Saint-Martin Saint-Jean-de-la Haize (10)	3–0	US Mortagnaise (8)
18.	FC Argentan (6)	0–6	AF Virois (5)
19.	AS Courteille Alençon (8)	3–2	AS La Selle-la-Forge (8)
20.	AM La Ferrière-aux-Etangs (9)	0–12	US Alençon (5)
21.	ASL Chemin Vert (10)	0–2	ASPTT Caen (6)
22.	US Athis (9)	0–3	US Saint-Pairaise (7)
23.	US Aunay-sur-Odon (8)	2–0	AS Potigny-Villers-Canivet-Ussy (8)
24.	US Gavray (11)	0–2	US Andaine (8)
25.	CS Villedieu (8)	0–0 (4–5 p)	ESFC Falaise (7)
26.	US Ducey-Isigny (7)	0–0 (5–4 p)	AS Verson (6)
27.	AS Ifs (7)	2–3	FC Flers (6)
28.	CL Colombellois (10)	0–2	US Villers-Bocage (7)
29.	AS Gacé (9)	1–3	Jeunesse Fertoise Bagnoles (7)
30.	US Pont-l'Évêque (9)	1–3	Saint-Sébastien Foot (7)
31.	FC Pays Aiglon (7)	2–1	FC Serquigny-Nassandres (8)
32.	Romilly Pont-Saint-Pierre FC (6)	0–2	FC Saint-Étienne-du-Rouvray (7)
33.	Olympique Darnétal (9)	0–8	SU Dives-Cabourg (5)
34.	US Gravigny (10)	0–0 (4–5 p)	CO Cléon (7)
35.	US Barroise (11)	0–7	Grand-Quevilly FC (5)
36.	Stade Porte Normande Vernon (7)	1–1 (2–3 p)	Saint Marcel Foot (7)
37.	CS Honfleur (8)	5–0 (Note: Tie reversed from original draw.)	US Conches (8)
38.	Saint-Aubin FC (8)	1–1 (4–3 p)	FC Gisors Vexin Normand (6)
39.	Charleval FC (10)	1–2	ES Normanville (7)
40.	FC Saint-Julien Petit Quevilly (7)	4–1	AS Gournay-en-Bray (8)
41.	AS Villers Houlgate Côte Fleurie (6)	2–2 (2–4 p)	CMS Oissel (5)
42.	FC Illiers-l'Évêque (8)	2–2 (4–2 p)	CA Pont-Audemer (8)
43.	CS Beaumont-le-Roger (8)	1–5	CA Lisieux Pays d'Auge (7)
44.	Rouen AC (10)	0–11	Pacy Ménilles RC (6)
45.	AS Montivilliers (8)	1–2	Le Havre Caucriauville Sportif (7)
46.	SC Octevillais (7)	1–1 (5–4 p)	JS Saint-Nicolas-d'Aliermont-Béthune (8)
47.	FC Barentinois (8)	1–1 (7–8 p)	ESM Gonfreville (5)
48.	Eu FC (8)	2–2 (4–2 p)	ES Mont-Gaillard (5)
49.	US Grèges (10)	1–0	Gainneville AC (9)
50.	ESI Saint-Antoine (10)	1–3	US Lillebonne (8)
51.	AS Sassetot-Thérouldeville (9)	1–1 (3–1 p)	AS Tréport (9)
52.	CA Harfleur Beaulieu (11)	0–2	FC Offranville (8)
53.	Caudebec-Saint-Pierre FC (7)	4–1	FC Tôtes (8)
54.	Stade Sottevillais CC (6)	2–0	US Bolbec (7)
55.	FC Le Trait-Duclair (7)	2–6	FC Dieppe (5)
56.	FC Neufchâtel (8)	2–1	FUSC Bois-Guillaume (7)
57.	US Godervillais (8)	0–0 (3–4 p)	Olympique Pavillais (7)
58.	ES Tourville (7)	2–4 (Note: CSSM Le Havre penalised for fielding too many transferred players, ES Tourville qualify.)	CSSM Le Havre (6)
59.	US Luneraysienne (6)	1–0	US Mesnil-Esnard/Franqueville (6)

=== Fourth round ===
These matches were played on 24 and 25 September 2022.

Fourth round results: Normandy
Tie no	Home team (tier)	Score	Away team (tier)
1.	Grand-Quevilly FC (5)	3–0 (Note: Tie reversed from original draw.)	US Luneraysienne (6)
2.	AS Sassetot-Thérouldeville (9)	0–2	Caudebec-Saint-Pierre FC (7)
3.	CO Cléon (7)	3–1	SC Octevillais (7)
4.	FC Offranville (8)	1–3	Le Havre Caucriauville Sportif (7)
5.	US Lillebonne (8)	1–4	FC Saint-Julien Petit Quevilly (7)
6.	FC Neufchâtel (8)	1–1 (5–3 p)	ESM Gonfreville (5)
7.	CMS Oissel (5)	4–0	Stade Sottevillais CC (6)
8.	FC Saint-Étienne-du-Rouvray (7)	1–3	Olympique Pavillais (7)
9.	ES Tourville (7)	0–5	FC Dieppe (5)
10.	Saint Marcel Foot (7)	0–1	Évreux FC 27 (4)
11.	Pacy Ménilles RC (6)	2–1	Saint-Sébastien Foot (7)
12.	US Grèges (10)	0–3	FC Illiers-l'Évêque (8)
13.	ES Normanville (7)	4–0	Saint-Aubin FC (8)
14.	SU Dives-Cabourg (5)	1–2	FC Rouen (4)
15.	Eu FC (8)	0–1	CS Honfleur (8)
16.	US Saint-Martin Saint-Jean-de-la Haize (10)	2–3	US Ducey-Isigny (7)
17.	US Saint-Pairaise (7)	1–0	FC Pays Aiglon (7)
18.	US Villers-Bocage (7)	8–0	FC 3 Rivières (8)
19.	FC Val de Saire (8)	0–0 (4–5 p)	Jeunesse Fertoise Bagnoles (7)
20.	JS Douvres (7)	0–5	FC Flers (6)
21.	US Côte des Iles (8)	1–1 (3–2 p)	AS Tourlaville (6)
22.	AS Jullouville-Sartilly (8)	0–1	FC Thaon-Bretteville-Le Fresne (8)
23.	PL Octeville (10)	1–2	AS Courteille Alençon (8)
24.	AS Cherbourg Football (5)	1–5	US Alençon (5)
25.	FC des Etangs (8)	0–1	JS Audrieu (9)
26.	ESFC Falaise (7)	0–5	ASPTT Caen (6)
27.	FC Saint-Lô Manche (5)	1–1 (7–8 p)	AG Caennaise (5)
28.	FC Mouen (11)	2–2 (4–1 p)	AS Thèreval (9)
29.	US Aunay-sur-Odon (8)	0–5	US Granville (4)
30.	US Andaine (8)	1–2	CA Lisieux Pays d'Auge (7)
31.	Bayeux FC (6)	0–4	AF Virois (5)

=== Fifth round ===
These matches were played on 8 and 9 October 2022.

Fifth round results: Normandy
Tie no	Home team (tier)	Score	Away team (tier)
1.	US Saint-Pairaise (7)	1–3	AF Virois (5)
2.	Jeunesse Fertoise Bagnoles (7)	1–0	US Côte des Iles (8)
3.	Le Havre Caucriauville Sportif (7)	1–0	ES Normanville (7)
4.	CS Honfleur (8)	0–8	US Alençon (5)
5.	ASPTT Caen (6)	0–2	CMS Oissel (5)
6.	FC Thaon-Bretteville-Le Fresne (8)	1–5	AG Caennaise (5)
7.	Olympique Pavillais (7)	2–4	US Granville (4)
8.	FC Mouen (11)	0–11	FC Rouen (4)
9.	JS Audrieu (9)	0–7	US Avranches (3)
10.	FC Illiers-l'Évêque (8)	1–3	CO Cléon (7)
11.	FC Saint-Julien Petit Quevilly (7)	5–2	FC Flers (6)
12.	AS Courteille Alençon (8)	0–2	US Ducey-Isigny (7)
13.	Caudebec-Saint-Pierre FC (7)	0–0 (4–2 p)	FC Neufchâtel (8)
14.	Évreux FC 27 (4)	2–0	FC Dieppe (5)
15.	CA Lisieux Pays d'Auge (7)	1–0	US Villers-Bocage (7)
16.	Grand-Quevilly FC (5)	1–0	Pacy Ménilles RC (6)

=== Sixth round ===
These matches were played on 15 and 16 October 2022.

Sixth round results: Normandy
Tie no	Home team (tier)	Score	Away team (tier)
1.	US Granville (4)	2–0	FC Rouen (4)
2.	AG Caennaise (5)	1–2	US Alençon (5)
3.	CA Lisieux Pays d'Auge (7)	1–5	CMS Oissel (5)
4.	FC Saint-Julien Petit Quevilly (7)	1–2	Le Havre Caucriauville Sportif (7)
5.	Jeunesse Fertoise Bagnoles (7)	0–3	US Avranches (3)
6.	US Ducey-Isigny (7)	1–4	Grand-Quevilly FC (5)
7.	Caudebec-Saint-Pierre FC (7)	0–3	Évreux FC 27 (4)
8.	CO Cléon (7)	1–7	AF Virois (5)
