= 2024–25 Coupe de France preliminary rounds, Normandy =

The 2024–25 Coupe de France preliminary rounds, Normandy was the qualifying competition to decide which teams from the leagues of the Normandy region of France took part in the main competition from the seventh round.

A total of nine teams qualified from the Normandy preliminary rounds.

In 2023–24, FC Rouen were the qualifying team from the region that progressed furthest in the competition. The team from Championnat National progressed to the quarter-final stage, beating Ligue 1 opposition Toulouse FC and AS Monaco FC on the way, before losing out to Ligue 2 side Valenciennes FC in a penalty shoot-out.

== Draws and fixtures ==
On 23 July 2024, the league published the structure of the qualifying competition in the region, along with the 134 ties of the first round, and the fact that 391 teams had entered. The second round draw, featuring 120 ties and the 106 regional level teams exempted from the first round draw, was published on 27 August 2024. The third round draw, which saw the entry to the competition of the teams from Championnat National 3 was published on 9 September 2024. 65 ties were drawn. The fourth round draw, featuring the entry to the competition of the teams from Championnat National 2 was published on 17 September 2024, and say 34 ties drawn. The fifth round draw, which included the two Championnat National teams from the region, was published on 1 October 2024, with 18 ties drawn. The 9 ties of the sixth round draw were published on 15 October 2024.

=== First round ===
These matches were played on 25 August 2024.

First Round Results: Normandy
Tie no	Home team (Tier)	Score	Away team (Tier)
1.	CS Barfleur (11)	1–4	AS Querqueville (10)
2.	AS Pointe Cotentin (9)	8–0	Bricqueboscq-Saint-Christophe-Grosville Sport (11)
3.	ASS Urville-Nacqueville (10)	3–4	SCU Douve Divette (10)
4.	AJ Saint-Hilaire-Petitville (9)	3–0	ES Quettetot-Rauville (10)
5.	AS Montebourg (10)	5–0	US Pierreville Saint-Germain-le-Gaillard (12)
6.	US La Glacerie (10)	2–0	PL Octeville (9)
7.	FC Digosville (11)	0–3 (Note: Tie won by means of forfeit.)	US Côte des Iles (8)
8.	ES Héauville-Siouville (11)	0–3	UC Bricquebec (9)
9.	FC Brix Sottevast Saint-Joseph (10)	4–1	Octeville Hague Sports (12)
10.	ES Plain (9)	0–2	FC Val de Saire (8)
11.	ASJ Blainville-Saint-Malo (11)	0–2	Entente Le Lorey-Hauteville-Feugères (11)
12.	US Roncey Cerisy (10)	1–3	CA Pontois (9)
13.	US Auvers (10)	0–4	ES Gouville-sur-Mer (10)
14.	SM Haytillon (10)	2–2 (2–4 p)	FC 3 Rivières (8)
15.	AS Sainte-Marie-du-Mont (11)	5–2	Périers SF (11)
16.	ES Cambernon Courcy (12)	0–6	Créances SF (9)
17.	ES des Marais (11)	1–2	US Percy (8)
18.	ES Marigny Lozon Mesnil Vogot (12)	0–5	AS Thèreval (9)
19.	US Semilly Saint-André (12)	0–6	Condé Sports (8)
20.	AS Saint-Jores (12)	0–6	AS Bérigny-Cerisy (9)
21.	ES Trelly Quettreville Contrières (10)	4–2	FC de l'Elle (9)
22.	US Lessay (11)	4–1	ES Munevillaise (11)
23.	FC Sienne (10)	1–1 (3–2 p)	FC Le Val Saint-Père (9)
24.	US Patriote Terregatte Beuvron (9)	1–5	US Saint-Quentin-sur-le-Homme (9)
25.	US Pontorson (10)	0–0 (2–4 p)	AS Jullouville-Sartilly (8)
26.	AS Saint-Ovin (12)	1–11	US Saint-Martin Saint-Jean-de-la Haize (9)
27.	USM Donville (11)	3–0	AS Sacey (11)
28.	AS Cerencaise (9)	2–2 (2–3 p)	AS Brécey (9)
29.	USCO Sourdeval (10)	2–4	La Bréhalaise FC (9)
30.	FC du Thar (10)	0–1	FC Terre et Mer (8)
31.	AS Val de Sienne (10)	0–5	CS Villedieu (8)
32.	CS Pays de Longny (11)	8–0	FC Mortrée (12)
33.	AM La Ferrière-aux-Etangs (9)	0–4	AS Berd'huis Foot (9)
34.	AS Valburgeoise (12)	0–0 (3–4 p)	AS Magny-le-Désert (10)
35.	US Athis (10)	2–2 (3–4 p)	SL Petruvien (10)
36.	AS Courteille Alençon (9)	1–0	FC Landais (9)
37.	La Vedette du Boisthorel (11)	2–1	AS Passais-Saint-Fraimbault (10)
38.	Amicale Chailloué (11)	3–0	FL Ségrie-Fontaine (11)
39.	Sées FC (11)	1–8	US Mortagnaise (9)
40.	ES Écouves (9)	1–1 (6–5 p)	US Andaine (8)
41.	ASA Saint-Germain-du-Corbéis (11)	2–3	US Mêloise (10)
42.	FC Carrouges (11)	0–3	AS Sarceaux Espoir (10)
43.	AS Le Merlerault Nonant-le-Pin (11)	2–4	Avenir Messei (9)
44.	FC Pays Bellêmois (11)	1–3	Hauts du Perche FC (9)
45.	US Flerienne (10)	2–4	AS Gacé (10)
46.	AS Boucé (10)	1–0	ES Pays d'Ouche (10)
47.	AS Saint-Sylvain (11)	0–3	USM Blainvillaise (9)
48.	FC Vital Démouville Cuverville (10)	3–4	ES Livarotaise (9)
49.	ES Courtonnaise (11)	0–0 (6–5 p)	CS Orbecquois-Vespèrois (9)
50.	FC Rocquancourt (11)	6–2	FC Moyaux (10)
51.	ES Portaise (9)	0–0 (6–7 p)	Lystrienne Sportive (8)
52.	AS Giberville (9)	4–1 (Note: AS Giberville penalised, ES Tronquay qualify. Reason unknown.)	ES Tronquay (10)
53.	ASL Ajon (10)	3–4	AF Basly (9)
54.	US Trévières (10)	2–2 (1–3 p)	Cresserons-Hermanville-Lion Terre et Mer (9)
55.	FC Baie de l'Orne (11)	3–0	US Guérinière (none)
56.	SC Saint-Julien-le-Faucon (12)	0–3	AS Saint-Philbert-des-Champs (12)
57.	AMC Val d'Auge (11)	5–4	CL Colombellois (10)
58.	EF Touques-St Gatien (11)	0–3	AS Saint-Désir (9)
59.	AS La Hoguette (11)	4–2	Cingal FC (10)
60.	ES Sannerville-Touffréville (9)	3–0	US Pétruvienne (10)
61.	Castelet FC (9)	1–2	ES Cormelles (10)
62.	ES Bonnebosq (11)	1–9	Réveil Saint-Germain Courseulles-sur-Mer (9)
63.	IS Caumontaise (11)	0–10	ES Thury-Harcourt (9)
64.	AS Mathieu (11)	1–0	AS Cahagnes (10)
65.	FC Laurentais Boulon (10)	0–3	JS Audrieu (9)
66.	US Aunay-sur-Odon (9)	3–3 (5–4 p) (Note: Tie reversed from original draw.)	NGS Ver-sur-Mer (11)
67.	Football Mixte Condé-en-Normandie (11)	1–2	UA Saint-Sever (10)
68.	FC Caen Sud Ouest (9)	4–1 (Note: FC Caen Sud Ouest penalised for fielding ineligible players, USI Bessin Nord qualify.)	USI Bessin Nord (8)
69.	USI La Graverie (11)	3–2	Inter Odon FC (8)
70.	FC Saint-Germain-Langot (12)	0–1	ESI Vallée de l'Orne (10)
71.	Grainville-sur-Odon FC (10)	4–1	JS Bocage (10)
72.	FC Mouen (10)	1–5	AS Saint-Vigor-le-Grand (10)
73.	Fontenay-le-Pesnel FC (10)	2–2 (1–3 p)	Dozulé FC (10)
74.	US Saint-Martin-Osmonville (10)	0–1	US Forêt de Roumare (10)
75.	ASPTT Rouen (10)	3–6	AS Buchy (9)
76.	AC Bray Est (10)	12–1	FC Ferrières-en-Bray (12)
77.	ES Montigny La Vaupalière (11)	1–3	FC Nord Ouest (10)
78.	ESI Saint-Antoine (10)	0–0 (3–5 p)	Le Havre FC 2012 (9)
79.	RC Port du Havre (9)	3–0	GS Saint-Aubin Saint-Vigor (10)
80.	US Saint-Thomas (11)	4–3	Gainneville AC (10)
81.	FC Manéglise (10)	0–5	FC Bréauté-Bretteville (10)
82.	US Grèges (10)	1–6	US Crielloise (9)
83.	AS Saint-Pierre-de-Varengeville (10)	3–0	FC Ventois (10)
84.	US Londinières (10)	2–1	AS Tréport (9)
85.	FC Sommery (11)	1–1 (3–4 p)	FC Biville-la-Baignarde (10)
86.	AS Ourville (8)	11–0	US Vatteville Brotonne (10)
87.	ES Plateau-Foucarmont-Réalcamp (8)	10–0	Entente Motteville/Croix-Mare (9)
88.	Belleville FC (8)	1–1 (4–5 p)	ES Janval (9)
89.	Boucle de Seine (9)	2–0	US Presqu'ile (10)
90.	AS Sassetot-Thérouldeville (10)	1–5	Entente Vienne et Saâne (9)
91.	CA Longuevillais (10)	0–0 (7–6 p)	JS Saint-Nicolas-d'Aliermont-Béthune (8)
92.	ES Aumaloise (10)	1–5	Caux FC (9)
93.	US Bacqueville-Pierreville (9)	1–0	FC Petit Caux (9)
94.	US Normande 76 (10)	1–3	US Auffay (8)
95.	ES Arques (10)	3–3 (3–4 p)	US Héricourt-en-Caux (9)
96.	US des Vallées (10)	0–6	US Doudeville (9)
97.	AS Ouvillaise (11)	2–2 (4–3 p)	Neuville AC (10)
98.	Olympique Saint-Martin (12)	1–11	Saint-Romain AC (9)
99.	Le Havre S'port (12)	2–4	Rogerville FC (12)
100.	AS La Frénaye (10)	1–7	ASL Ramponneau (10)
101.	US Allouville Trouville (11)	0–6	FC Gruchet-le-Valasse (10)
102.	FC Rolleville (9)	1–1 (3–4 p)	US des Falaises (10)
103.	SS Gournay (9)	2–2 (1–3 p)	US Épouville (9)
104.	FC Tôtes (9)	10–0	AS Vallée du Dun (12)
105.	AS Mesnières (10)	1–2	FC Fréville-Bouville SIVOM (10)
106.	FC Boos (12)	2–5	SC Petit-Couronne (11)
107.	ASC Jiyan Kurdistan (9)	3–2	Amicale Houlmoise Bondevillaise FC (9)
108.	Stade Grand-Quevilly (8)	1–0	AS Gournay-en-Bray (8)
109.	US Saint-Jacques-sur-Darnétal (11)	0–3	GCO Bihorel (9)
110.	FC Bonsecours Saint Léger (10)	0–6	Canteleu FC (9)
111.	RC Rouen (12)	1–6	FUSC Bois-Guillaume (8)
112.	Rouen AC (10)	0–3	FC de la Varenne (10)
113.	Entente Saint Pierraise (11)	2–1	AS SYNQ Villages (11)
114.	AS Vesly (10)	1–3	FC Illiers-l'Évêque (8)
115.	FC Prey (10)	3–7	CS Bonneville (9)
116.	Fusion Charentonne Saint-Aubin (12)	1–3	FC Roumois Nord (11)
117.	US Étrépagny (11)	4–1	CS Andelys (9)
118.	AC Beuzeville (10)	2–5	FCI Bel Air (9)
119.	RC Léry (11)	1–2	SC Thiberville (10)
120.	US Barroise (10)	1–1 (4–3 p)	AS Courcelles (9)
121.	AS Manneville Saint-Mards Fourmetot Corneville (11)	1–1 (5–4 p)	US Louviers (11)
122.	AS Criquebeuf Football (11)	0–4	AS Routot (10)
123.	Stade Vernolien (9)	6–1	Soligny-Aspres-Moulins Football (10)
124.	CF La Chapelle-du-Bois-des-Faulx (12)	2–3	FC Brionne (11)
125.	US Rugles-Lyre (9)	3–0	Navarre FC (10)
126.	RC Muids-Daubeuf-Vauvray (11)	0–2	FC Croth-Marcilly (11)
127.	CS Ivry-la-Bataille (11)	2–10	ES Vallée de l'Oison (10)
128.	Yerville FC (10)	6–2	Stade Valeriquais (10)
129.	Charleval FC (10)	3–0	SC Bernay (10)
130.	RC Malherbe Surville (12)	2–2 (3–4 p)	Romilly Pont-Saint-Pierre FC (8)
131.	CS Lyonsais (12)	0–3	Club Andelle Pîtres (12)
132.	FC Val de Risle (9)	5–2	US Cormeilles-Lieurey (10)
133.	CS Beaumont-le-Roger (9)	0–0 (4–3 p)	CA Pont-Audemer (9)
134.	FA Roumois (10)	5–2	La Croix Vallée d'Eure (9)

=== Second round ===
These matches were played on 31 August and 1 September 2024.

Second Round Results: Normandy
Tie no	Home team (Tier)	Score	Away team (Tier)
1.	US La Glacerie (10)	6–0	AS Sainte-Marie-du-Mont (11)
2.	UC Bricquebec (9)	0–3	AS Valognes (8)
3.	AS Querqueville (10)	0–0 (4–1 p)	AJ Saint-Hilaire-Petitville (9)
4.	FC Val de Saire (8)	7–1	FC Brix Sottevast Saint-Joseph (10)
5.	SCU Douve Divette (10)	1–2	AS Pointe Cotentin (9)
6.	US Côte des Iles (8)	0–0 (4–2 p)	ES Pointe Hague (8)
7.	La Bréhalaise FC (9)	1–3	AS Tourlaville (7)
8.	AS Cherbourg Football (7)	2–0	FC Équeurdreville-Hainneville (6)
9.	US Saint-Martin Saint-Jean-de-la Haize (9)	2–2 (3–4 p)	USM Donville (11)
10.	Entente Le Lorey-Hauteville-Feugères (11)	0–2	AS Bérigny-Cerisy (9)
11.	Saint-Hilaire-Virey-Landelles (7)	1–1 (2–4 p)	CS Carentan (6)
12.	ES Gouville-sur-Mer (10)	3–0	ES Trelly Quettreville Contrières (10)
13.	US Saint-Quentin-sur-le-Homme (9)	0–1	Tessy-Moyon Sports (8)
14.	Créances SF (9)	10–0	FC Sienne (10)
15.	AS Brécey (9)	0–1	FC Terre et Mer (8)
16.	US Percy (8)	3–3 (5–4 p)	US Sainte-Croix Saint-Lô (8)
17.	CA Pontois (9)	1–5	FC Agon-Coutainville (7)
18.	CS Villedieu (8)	0–2	US Ducey-Isigny (8)
19.	US Lessay (11)	0–7	ES Coutances (7)
20.	US Ouest Cotentin (8)	2–1	ES Saint-Sauveur-La Ronde-Haye (7)
21.	FC 3 Rivières (8)	2–3 (Note: Agneaux FC penalised, FC 3 Rivières qualify. Reason unknown.)	Agneaux FC (7)
22.	AS Thèreval (9)	1–1 (7–8 p)	AS Jullouville-Sartilly (8)
23.	AS Berd'huis Foot (9)	5–1	SL Petruvien (10)
24.	JS Tinchebray (8)	2–2 (4–2 p)	Espérance Condé-sur-Sarthe (8)
25.	AS Boucé (10)	0–5	Jeunesse Fertoise Bagnoles (6)
26.	OC Briouze (8)	2–0	AS La Selle-la-Forge (8)
27.	CS Pays de Longny (11)	4–9	US Rugles-Lyre (9)
28.	La Vedette du Boisthorel (11)	1–4	US Mortagnaise (9)
29.	ES Écouves (9)	3–1	CO Ceaucé (8)
30.	Avenir Messei (9)	2–1	US Mêloise (10)
31.	Hauts du Perche FC (9)	1–2	FC Pays Aiglon (8)
32.	AS Sarceaux Espoir (10)	1–2	AS Gacé (10)
33.	AS Courteille Alençon (9)	1–2	Leopards Saint-Georges (7)
34.	Amicale Chailloué (11)	1–6	FC Argentan (8)
35.	AS Magny-le-Désert (10)	1–3	SS Domfrontaise (8)
36.	AS Montebourg (10)	0–3	Condé Sports (8)
37.	Réveil Saint-Germain Courseulles-sur-Mer (9)	0–4	Maladrerie OS (6)
38.	ES Thury-Harcourt (9)	1–5	FC des Etangs (7)
39.	Hastings FC Rots Cheux Saint-Manvieu Norrey (8)	1–5	USON Mondeville (7)
40.	ES Cormelles (10)	1–2	ASL Chemin Vert (8)
41.	Grainville-sur-Odon FC (10)	1–6	US Aunay-sur-Odon (9)
42.	JS Audrieu (9)	2–2 (3–1 p)	AS Verson (7)
43.	USI La Graverie (11)	0–3	US Villers-Bocage (7)
44.	Lystrienne Sportive (8)	0–3	SC Hérouvillais (7)
45.	ESI Vallée de l'Orne (10)	4–1	FC Thaon-Bretteville-Le Fresne (7)
46.	UA Saint-Sever (10)	0–2	AS Mathieu (11)
47.	LC Bretteville-sur-Odon (8)	0–1	AS Ifs (8)
48.	Bayeux FC (6)	1–0	JS Douvres (7)
49.	AS Ouvillaise (11)	0–5	US Auffay (8)
50.	AS Saint-Désir (9)	2–3	US Pont-l'Évêque (8)
51.	ES Sannerville-Touffréville (9)	1–5	CA Lisieux Pays d'Auge (7)
52.	AMC Val d'Auge (11)	1–11	ES Carpiquet (7)
53.	AS Saint-Philbert-des-Champs (12)	1–4	FC Troarn (8)
54.	ES Courtonnaise (11)	0–6	ES Livarotaise (9)
55.	Muance FC (8)	1–2	CS Honfleur (8)
56.	Dozulé FC (10)	1–5	Cresserons-Hermanville-Lion Terre et Mer (9)
57.	AJS Colleville Ouistreham (8)	0–3 (Note: USC Mézidon penalised for fielding a suspended player, AJS Colleville Ouistreham qualify.)	USC Mézidon (6)
58.	FC Baie de l'Orne (11)	2–4	Bourguébus-Soliers FC (8)
59.	AS Potigny-Villers-Canivet-Ussy (8)	0–6	AS Trouville-Deauville (6)
60.	FC Rocquancourt (11)	2–2 (2–3 p)	USM Blainvillaise (9)
61.	AS La Hoguette (11)	0–7	ESFC Falaise (7)
62.	US Forêt de Roumare (10)	1–3	US Londinières (10)
63.	FC de la Varenne (10)	2–3	Saint-Aubin FC (8)
64.	Mont-Saint-Aignan FC (7)	2–0	AS Madrillet Château Blanc (8)
65.	SC Petit-Couronne (11)	0–1	Caudebec-Saint-Pierre FC (8)
66.	ASC Jiyan Kurdistan (9)	3–1	CO Cléon (8)
67.	Caux FC (9)	1–2	FC Saint-Étienne-du-Rouvray (7)
68.	FC Nord Ouest (10)	0–0 (4–3 p)	Plateau de Quincampoix FC (8)
69.	CA Longuevillais (10)	1–1 (5–6 p)	US Mesnil-Esnard/Franqueville (7)
70.	ES Tourville (8)	3–0	FC Tourville-La-Rivière (8)
71.	CS Gravenchon (8)	4–2	US Lillebonne (7)
72.	Saint-Romain AC (9)	3–5	AS Fauvillaise (8)
73.	Entente Saint Pierraise (11)	1–6	ES Mont-Gaillard (7)
74.	Olympique Darnétal (8)	3–3 (4–2 p)	FC Le Trait-Duclair (8)
75.	FC Fréville-Bouville SIVOM (10)	1–0	US Doudeville (9)
76.	US Crielloise (9)	0–0 (5–4 p)	Boucle de Seine (9)
77.	GCO Bihorel (9)	0–5	FC Neufchâtel (7)
78.	FC Offranville (8)	4–0	Rouen Sapins FC Grand-Mare (8)
79.	ES Janval (9)	1–4	Stade Grand-Quevilly (8)
80.	FUSC Bois-Guillaume (8)	3–2	ES Plateau-Foucarmont-Réalcamp (8)
81.	AC Bray Est (10)	2–2 (2–4 p)	Stade Sottevillais CC (6)
82.	FC Biville-la-Baignarde (10)	0–4	AS Buchy (9)
83.	FC Tôtes (9)	2–6	FC Saint-Julien Petit Quevilly (7)
84.	Entente Vienne et Saâne (9)	0–1	AL Déville-Maromme (7)
85.	US Épouville (9)	0–5	FC Barentinois (8)
86.	FC Gruchet-le-Valasse (10)	0–3	Olympia'caux FC (7)
87.	Olympique Pavillais (7)	0–1	Le Havre Caucriauville Sportif (6)
88.	Rogerville FC (12)	1–6	US Bolbec (6)
89.	FC Bréauté-Bretteville (10)	1–4	Yerville FC (10)
90.	AS Montivilliers (8)	4–0	AS Sainte-Adresse But (8)
91.	AS Ourville (8)	1–3	CSSM Le Havre (6)
92.	SC Frileuse (8)	1–1 (4–3 p)	SC Octevillais (7)
93.	ASL Ramponneau (10)	0–6	Yvetot AC (6)
94.	Le Havre FC 2012 (9)	0–4	USF Fécamp (7)
95.	US des Falaises (10)	0–1	US Saint-Thomas (11)
96.	US Héricourt-en-Caux (9)	2–4	Olympique Havrais Tréfileries-Neiges (7)
97.	Cany FC (8)	0–2	ESM Gonfreville (6)
98.	FA Roumois (10)	2–1	FC Illiers-l'Évêque (8)
99.	FC Val de Reuil (7)	3–2	FAC Alizay (7)
100.	US Gasny (8)	3–0	US Conches (8)
101.	ES Normanville (7)	1–4	Stade Porte Normande Vernon (6)
102.	FCI Bel Air (9)	1–1 (5–4 p)	FC Val de Risle (9)
103.	AS Routot (10)	0–6	Évreux FC 27 (7)
104.	FC Roumois Nord (11)	0–5	FC Serquigny-Nassandres (7)
105.	Stade Vernolien (9)	3–0	US Barroise (10)
106.	SC Thiberville (10)	0–2	Saint-Sébastien Foot (7)
107.	Club Andelle Pîtres (12)	1–9	US Étrépagny (11)
108.	ES Vallée de l'Oison (10)	4–3	AS Andréseinne (8)
109.	CS Bonneville (9)	1–4	Pacy Ménilles RC (6)
110.	FC Pays du Neubourg (7)	1–1 (5–6 p)	FC Gisors Vexin Normand (6)
111.	CS Beaumont-le-Roger (9)	1–3	Saint Marcel Foot (6)
112.	Romilly Pont-Saint-Pierre FC (8)	0–1	FC Garennes-Bueil-La Couture-Breuilpont (8)
113.	FC Brionne (11)	0–5	FC Seine-Eure (8)
114.	AS Manneville Saint-Mards Fourmetot Corneville (11)	2–3	FC Eure Madrie Seine (8)
115.	FC Croth-Marcilly (11)	2–3	Charleval FC (10)
116.	AS Canton d'Argueil (8)	3–4	Canteleu FC (9)
117.	RC Port du Havre (9)	0–1	US Luneraysienne (6)
118.	AF Basly (9)	3–1	ES Tronquay (10)
119.	AS Saint-Vigor-le-Grand (10)	3–0	USI Bessin Nord (8)
120.	AS Saint-Pierre-de-Varengeville (10)	2–0	US Bacqueville-Pierreville (9)

=== Third round ===
These matches were played on 14 and 15 September 2024.

Third Round Results: Normandy
Tie no	Home team (Tier)	Score	Away team (Tier)
1.	US Aunay-sur-Odon (9)	2–6	FC Flers (5)
2.	Avenir Messei (9)	0–5	Maladrerie OS (6)
3.	AS Valognes (8)	1–4	CS Carentan (6)
4.	ES Coutances (7)	1–2	US Villers-Bocage (7)
5.	FC Terre et Mer (8)	0–4	AF Virois (5)
6.	USM Donville (11)	0–6	AS Tourlaville (7)
7.	Créances SF (9)	1–2	Jeunesse Fertoise Bagnoles (6)
8.	OC Briouze (8)	2–0	JS Audrieu (9)
9.	US La Glacerie (10)	0–2	FC Val de Saire (8)
10.	ES Carpiquet (7)	0–3	FC des Etangs (7)
11.	Leopards Saint-Georges (7)	0–4	Bayeux FC (6)
12.	AS Saint-Vigor-le-Grand (10)	1–5	AS Cherbourg Football (7)
13.	AF Basly (9)	0–5	FC Agon-Coutainville (7)
14.	US Ducey-Isigny (8)	0–1	FC Saint-Lô Manche (5)
15.	Condé Sports (8)	0–0 (4–3 p)	AS Jullouville-Sartilly (8)
16.	ES Gouville-sur-Mer (10)	3–1	US Côte des Iles (8)
17.	US Percy (8)	6–0	US Ouest Cotentin (8)
18.	AS Querqueville (10)	0–0 (2–3 p)	ESI Vallée de l'Orne (10)
19.	AS Pointe Cotentin (9)	1–2 (Note: Tie reversed from original draw.)	FC 3 Rivières (8)
20.	SS Domfrontaise (8)	1–1 (3–4 p)	JS Tinchebray (8)
21.	AS Bérigny-Cerisy (9)	0–2	Tessy-Moyon Sports (8)
22.	FC Serquigny-Nassandres (7)	2–1	Stade Porte Normande Vernon (6)
23.	USM Blainvillaise (9)	3–3 (3–4 p)	FC Pays Aiglon (8)
24.	AS Ifs (8)	0–5	SU Dives-Cabourg (5)
25.	Saint Marcel Foot (6)	2–1	ASPTT Caen (5)
26.	CA Lisieux Pays d'Auge (7)	5–0	US Pont-l'Évêque (8)
27.	Stade Vernolien (9)	3–0	ES Vallée de l'Oison (10)
28.	FA Roumois (10)	0–5	SC Hérouvillais (7)
29.	USON Mondeville (7)	2–1	Grand-Quevilly FC (5)
30.	FC Argentan (8)	3–2	FC Val de Reuil (7)
31.	US Alençon (5)	1–1 (5–4 p)	CMS Oissel (5)
32.	Évreux FC 27 (7)	1–1 (4–5 p)	AG Caennaise (5)
33.	Saint-Sébastien Foot (7)	1–0	AJS Colleville Ouistreham (8)
34.	Caudebec-Saint-Pierre FC (8)	1–0	Bourguébus-Soliers FC (8)
35.	CS Honfleur (8)	2–1	FC Troarn (8)
36.	ES Livarotaise (9)	0–0 (4–2 p)	Pacy Ménilles RC (6)
37.	US Mortagnaise (9)	3–0	AS Berd'huis Foot (9)
38.	FC Seine-Eure (8)	1–4	FC Eure Madrie Seine (8)
39.	AS Mathieu (11)	6–1	ES Écouves (9)
40.	Cresserons-Hermanville-Lion Terre et Mer (9)	6–0	US Rugles-Lyre (9)
41.	Saint-Aubin FC (8)	1–0	ASL Chemin Vert (8)
42.	AS Gacé (10)	2–4	ESFC Falaise (7)
43.	FC Garennes-Bueil-La Couture-Breuilpont (8)	0–5	AS Trouville-Deauville (6)
44.	US Londinières (10)	0–3	Olympia'caux FC (7)
45.	AL Déville-Maromme (7)	2–0	FC Offranville (8)
46.	ESM Gonfreville (6)	2–1	Yvetot AC (6)
47.	FC Nord Ouest (10)	2–4	Mont-Saint-Aignan FC (7)
48.	ES Mont-Gaillard (7)	2–2 (3–4 p)	US Gasny (8)
49.	US Auffay (8)	1–3	Canteleu FC (9)
50.	Charleval FC (10)	7–0	US Étrépagny (11)
51.	Yerville FC (10)	0–5	US Mesnil-Esnard/Franqueville (7)
52.	CS Gravenchon (8)	2–2 (4–5 p)	ES Tourville (8)
53.	SC Frileuse (8)	0–5	US Bolbec (6)
54.	Stade Grand-Quevilly (8)	4–0	FCI Bel Air (9)
55.	US Crielloise (9)	0–1	FC Saint-Julien Petit Quevilly (7)
56.	FC Saint-Étienne-du-Rouvray (7)	2–0	FC Barentinois (8)
57.	FC Fréville-Bouville SIVOM (10)	0–9	AS Fauvillaise (8)
58.	FC Neufchâtel (7)	1–0	FC Dieppe (5)
59.	Olympique Havrais Tréfileries-Neiges (7)	1–0	USF Fécamp (7)
60.	US Saint-Thomas (11)	0–6	ASC Jiyan Kurdistan (9)
61.	AS Buchy (9)	1–10	AS Montivilliers (8)
62.	FUSC Bois-Guillaume (8)	0–0 (3–4 p)	Olympique Darnétal (8)
63.	FC Gisors Vexin Normand (6)	1–1 (8–7 p)	CSSM Le Havre (6)
64.	US Luneraysienne (6)	1–2	Le Havre Caucriauville Sportif (6)
65.	AS Saint-Pierre-de-Varengeville (10)	0–2	Stade Sottevillais CC (6)

=== Fourth round ===
These matches were played on 28 and 29 September 2024.

Fourth Round Results: Normandy
Tie no	Home team (Tier)	Score	Away team (Tier)
1.	FC Pays Aiglon (8)	3–3 (5–4 p)	US Percy (8)
2.	ES Gouville-sur-Mer (10)	0–2	AS Tourlaville (7)
3.	ESFC Falaise (7)	1–3	Stade Grand-Quevilly (8)
4.	ES Tourville (8)	0–2	US Avranches (4)
5.	US Gasny (8)	2–3	USON Mondeville (7)
6.	FC 3 Rivières (8)	1–2	Bayeux FC (6)
7.	Tessy-Moyon Sports (8)	1–1 (6–5 p)	CS Carentan (6)
8.	ASC Jiyan Kurdistan (9)	2–1	FC Val de Saire (8)
9.	Saint Marcel Foot (6)	3–1	CA Lisieux Pays d'Auge (7)
10.	Mont-Saint-Aignan FC (7)	0–1	Olympique Havrais Tréfileries-Neiges (7)
11.	AS Fauvillaise (8)	2–2 (3–4 p)	Canteleu FC (9)
12.	Caudebec-Saint-Pierre FC (8)	3–1	Stade Vernolien (9)
13.	AL Déville-Maromme (7)	2–1	US Granville (4)
14.	ES Livarotaise (9)	0–0 (2–3 p)	Condé Sports (8)
15.	Stade Sottevillais CC (6)	0–0 (4–5 p)	FC des Etangs (7)
16.	Olympique Darnétal (8)	0–0 (3–2 p)	Jeunesse Fertoise Bagnoles (6)
17.	US Mortagnaise (9)	0–3	SU Dives-Cabourg (5)
18.	Le Havre Caucriauville Sportif (6)	1–2	US Alençon (5)
19.	SC Hérouvillais (7)	0–2	Maladrerie OS (6)
20.	CS Honfleur (8)	2–2 (5–4 p)	OC Briouze (8)
21.	US Bolbec (6)	5–1 (Note: Tie reversed from original draw.)	Saint-Aubin FC (8)
22.	FC Argentan (8)	2–2 (8–7 p)	FC Gisors Vexin Normand (6)
23.	ESI Vallée de l'Orne (10)	0–3	Olympia'caux FC (7)
24.	US Villers-Bocage (7)	3–1	FC Saint-Étienne-du-Rouvray (7)
25.	Saint-Sébastien Foot (7)	2–4	AG Caennaise (5)
26.	AS Montivilliers (8)	0–1	FC Agon-Coutainville (7)
27.	FC Eure Madrie Seine (8)	1–2	AS Trouville-Deauville (6)
28.	JS Tinchebray (8)	0–2	FC Flers (5)
29.	US Mesnil-Esnard/Franqueville (7)	0–1	FC Serquigny-Nassandres (7)
30.	AS Mathieu (11)	0–1	FC Saint-Julien Petit Quevilly (7)
31.	ESM Gonfreville (6)	1–2	AS Villers Houlgate Côte Fleurie (4)
32.	Charleval FC (10)	0–3	AF Virois (5)
33.	FC Neufchâtel (7)	0–1	FC Saint-Lô Manche (5)
34.	Cresserons-Hermanville-Lion Terre et Mer (9)	1–3	AS Cherbourg Football (7)

=== Fifth round ===
These matches were played on 12 and 13 October 2024.

Fifth Round Results: Normandy
Tie no	Home team (Tier)	Score	Away team (Tier)
1.	AS Trouville-Deauville (6)	0–3	FC Rouen (3)
2.	Condé Sports (8)	0–3	US Bolbec (6)
3.	FC Serquigny-Nassandres (7)	1–1 (7–6 p)	AS Cherbourg Football (7)
4.	AL Déville-Maromme (7)	0–2	US Quevilly-Rouen Métropole (3)
5.	Olympique Darnétal (8)	0–2	Maladrerie OS (6)
6.	FC Agon-Coutainville (7)	1–1 (2–4 p)	USON Mondeville (7)
7.	Stade Grand-Quevilly (8)	1–2 (Note: US Villers-Bocage penalised for fielding too many transferred players. Stade Grand-Quevilly qualify.)	US Villers-Bocage (7)
8.	ASC Jiyan Kurdistan (9)	0–8	AS Villers Houlgate Côte Fleurie (4)
9.	Bayeux FC (6)	0–1 (Note: Match abandoned at half time due to a floodlight failure. Bayeux FC penalised due to not having a technician at the ground. SU Dives-Cabourg qualify.)	SU Dives-Cabourg (5)
10.	FC Flers (5)	1–1 (4–2 p)	AF Virois (5)
11.	Olympique Havrais Tréfileries-Neiges (7)	4–5	AG Caennaise (5)
12.	FC Argentan (8)	0–3	US Alençon (5)
13.	AS Tourlaville (7)	4–1	Caudebec-Saint-Pierre FC (8)
14.	FC des Etangs (7)	4–4 (3–4 p)	FC Pays Aiglon (8)
15.	Olympia'caux FC (7)	2–2 (5–4 p)	Saint Marcel Foot (6)
16.	Canteleu FC (9)	3–1	CS Honfleur (8)
17.	Tessy-Moyon Sports (8)	1–3	US Avranches (4)
18.	FC Saint-Julien Petit Quevilly (7)	1–5	FC Saint-Lô Manche (5)

=== Sixth round ===
These matches were played on 26 and 27 October 2024.

Sixth Round Results: Normandy
Tie no	Home team (Tier)	Score	Away team (Tier)
1.	FC Pays Aiglon (8)	0–3	Maladrerie OS (6)
2.	FC Rouen (3)	11–1 (Note: Tie reversed from original draw.)	Stade Grand-Quevilly (8)
3.	AS Villers Houlgate Côte Fleurie (4)	1–2	US Avranches (4)
4.	FC Serquigny-Nassandres (7)	2–1	FC Flers (5)
5.	FC Saint-Lô Manche (5)	5–0	AG Caennaise (5)
6.	Olympia'caux FC (7)	0–0 (3–4 p)	US Alençon (5)
7.	USON Mondeville (7)	0–3	US Quevilly-Rouen Métropole (3)
8.	Canteleu FC (9)	1–1 (3–4 p)	US Bolbec (6)
9.	AS Tourlaville (7)	0–4	SU Dives-Cabourg (5)
