= 2019–20 Coupe de France preliminary rounds, Normandy =

French football competition

The 2019–20 Coupe de France preliminary rounds, Normandy was the qualifying competition to decide which teams from the leagues of the Normandy region of France took part in the main competition from the seventh round.

A total of eight teams qualified from the Normandy preliminary rounds. In 2018–19 none of the teams that qualified progressed beyond the eighth round.

== Schedule ==
The first round of the qualifying competition took place on the weekend of 24 August. A total of 284 teams participated in the first round from Régionale 3 (tier 8) and below. 11 Régionale 3 teams were given byes to the second round, and entered at that stage with all 40 Régional 2 (tier 7) teams and all 19 Régionale 1 (tier 6) teams.

The third round draw took place on 4 September 2019. The ten Championnat National 3 (tier 5) teams entered at this stage.

The fourth round draw took place on 19 September 2019. The three Championnat National 2 (tier 4) teams entered at this stage. 30 ties were drawn.

The fifth round draw took place on 2 October 2019. The two Championnat National (tier 3) teams entered at this stage. 16 ties were drawn.

The sixth round draw took place on 19 October 2019. Eight ties were drawn.

=== First round ===
These matches were played on 25 August 2019.

First round results: Normandy
| Tie no | Home team (tier) | Score | Away team (tier) |
|---|---|---|---|
| 1. | Bricqueboscq - St Christophe-Grosville Sport (12) | 3–4 | FC Digosville (10) |
| 2. | FC Bretteville-en-Saire (12) | 1–4 | ES Plain (9) |
| 3. | CS Barfleur (12) | 2–6 | AS Querqueville (9) |
| 4. | US Auvers-Baupte (11) | 0–3 (Note: Tie won by means of forfeit.) | AS Valognes (8) |
| 5. | AS Ste Marie-du-Mont (11) | 3–5 | US La Glacerie (10) |
| 6. | SM Haytillon (10) | 0–2 | Elan Tocqueville (8) |
| 7. | PL Octeville (9) | 2–5 | US Côte-des-Isles (8) |
| 8. | AS Brix (9) | 0–3 | UC Bricquebec (8) |
| 9. | AS Pointe Cotentin (9) | 2–2 (4–5 p) | SCU Douve Divette (8) |
| 10. | ES des Marais (10) | 0–3 | FC Val de Saire (8) |
| 11. | ES St Sauveur-La Ronde-Haye (9) | 1–1 (9–8 p) | FC des Etangs (8) |
| 12. | ES Gouville-sur-Mer (10) | 3–1 | Condé Sports (8) |
| 13. | US Roncey-Cerisy (11) | 3–1 | ES Munevillaise (11) |
| 14. | ES Marigny-Lozon-Mesnil-Vigot (11) | 1–4 | FC Agon-Coutainville (9) |
| 15. | Créances SF (8) | 23–0 (Note: Tie reversed with the agreement of both clubs.) | JA Denneville-St Rémy-des Landes (12) |
| 16. | Périers SF (10) | 0–6 | FC 3 Rivières (8) |
| 17. | Patriote St Jamaise (9) | 1–0 | SS Domfrontaise (8) |
| 18. | AS Cerencaise (11) | 1–9 | US St Quentin-sur-le-Homme (9) |
| 19. | US Pontorson (11) | 1–3 (a.e.t.) | FC Val-St Père (9) |
| 20. | La Bréhalaise FC (10) | 1–1 (1–4 p) | St Hilaire-Virey-Landelles (8) |
| 21. | Entente Le Lorey-Hautville-Feugères (11) | 4–2 | Esperance Ste Suzanne (11) |
| 22. | US Lessay (11) | 3–0 | Claies de Vire FC (11) |
| 23. | FC Sienne (12) | 1–2 | ES Hébécrevon (10) |
| 24. | US Vesly-Laulne (11) | 0–3 | CA Pontois (9) |
| 25. | FC de l'Elle (10) | 0–2 | US Ste Croix St Lô (9) |
| 26. | ES Haylande (9) | 1–3 | US St Pairaise (8) |
| 27. | AS Guilberville (11) | 0–2 | Tessy-Moyon Sports (9) |
| 28. | ES Terregate-Beuvron-Juilley (10) | 0–0 (2–3 p) | AS Brécey (8) |
| 29. | USCO Sourdeval (8) | 7–0 | US St Martin-des-Champs (9) |
| 30. | Espérance St Jean-des-Champs (8) | 2–1 | USM Donville (9) |
| 31. | US Percy (9) | 0–3 | AS Jullouville-Sartilly (8) |
| 32. | AM La Ferrière-aux-Etangs (9) | 2–7 | US Athis (8) |
| 33. | SL Petruvien (9) | 3–1 | Leopards St Georges (8) |
| 34. | Avenir Messei (9) | 3–7 | US Andaine (8) |
| 35. | US Randonnai (9) | 1–5 | US Mortagnaise (8) |
| 36. | ES Écouves (9) | 1–1 (4–5 p) | AS Berd'huis Foot (8) |
| 37. | AS Valburgeoise (9) | 1–6 | FC Pays Aiglon (8) |
| 38. | Sées FC (9) | 0–3 | Espérance Condé-sur-Sarthe (8) |
| 39. | AS Gacé (9) | 1–0 | Vimoutiers FC (8) |
| 40. | SC Damigny (10) | 1–4 | Avenir St Germain-du-Corbéis (9) |
| 41. | Amicale Chailloué (9) | 5–3 (Note: Amicale Chailloué penalised for fielding an ineligible player. Soligny-Aspres-Moulins qualify.) | Soligny-Aspres-Moulins (9) |
| 42. | US Putanges (11) | 1–0 | US Frênes-Montsecret (10) |
| 43. | US Ménil-de-Briouze (10) | 1–0 | AS Sarceaux Espoir (10) |
| 44. | US Mêloise (11) | 3–0 | AC Bazoches (10) |
| 45. | AS Passais-St Fraimbault (9) | 1–3 | OC Briouze (8) |
| 46. | CO Ceaucé (9) | 1–4 | AS La Selle-la-Forge (8) |
| 47. | JS Tinchebray (10) | 2–4 | AS Vaudry-Truttemer (8) |
| 48. | AS Monts d'Andaine (9) | 3–4 | AS Boucé (9) |
| 49. | AS La Hoguette (11) | 0–7 | Muance FC (8) |
| 50. | US Tilly-sur-Seulles (10) | 4–1 | US Aunay-sur-Odon (8) |
| 51. | AS St Aignan-de-Cramesnil/Langannerie (11) | 0–0 (3–1 p) | ES Cormelles (10) |
| 52. | AS Perrières (11) | 0–5 | AC Démouville-Cuverville (10) |
| 53. | ES Tronquay (10) | 0–3 | ES Val de l'Orne (9) |
| 54. | AS St Cyr-Fervaques (9) | 0–1 | Stade St Sauverais (8) |
| 55. | AS Cahagnes (10) | 0–5 | FC Thaon-Bretteville-Le Fresne (8) |
| 56. | US Authie (11) | 2–4 | FC Troarn (8) |
| 57. | Cresserons-Hermanville-Lion Terre et Mer (10) | 2–4 | FC Baie de l'Orne (8) |
| 58. | FC Vital (12) | 0–2 | JS Audrieu (9) |
| 59. | US Pétruvienne (11) | 0–4 | ES Livarotaise (8) |
| 60. | CL Colombellois (10) | 1–0 (a.e.t.) | ES Portaise (9) |
| 61. | AS Biéville-Beuville (10) | 0–3 | Lystrienne Sportive (9) |
| 62. | US Villerville (10) | 1–4 | CS Orbecquois-Vespèrois (9) |
| 63. | AS St Philbert-des-Champs (10) | 0–7 | US Pont-l'Évêque (8) |
| 64. | ES Isigny-sur-Mer (11) | 0–1 | US Guérinière (9) |
| 65. | ES Bonnebosq (11) | 3–3 (3–4 p) | FC Moyaux (9) |
| 66. | JS Fleury-sur-Orne (10) | 2–4 (a.e.t.) | US Cheux-St Manvieu-Norrey (9) |
| 67. | ES Sannerville-Touffréville (11) | 1–4 | Dozulé FC (9) |
| 68. | FC Hastings Rots (10) | 0–1 | SC Hérouvillais (8) |
| 69. | Cambes-en-Plaine Sports (11) | 0–3 | ES Carpiquet (8) |
| 70. | FC Langrune-Luc (10) | 0–3 | USI Bessin Nord (8) |
| 71. | FC Caen Sud Ouest (10) | 0–7 | AS St Vigor-le-Grand (8) |
| 72. | AS Giberville (10) | 0–3 | JS Colleville (8) |
| 73. | ES Courtonnaise (10) | 0–3 | Cingal FC (8) |
| 74. | US Trévières (10) | 1–1 (4–2 p) | USM Blainvillaise (9) |
| 75. | US Maisons (10) | 1–3 | ESI May-sur-Orne (9) |
| 76. | AS Mathieu (11) | 1–13 | ES Thury-Harcourt (8) |
| 77. | MSL Garcelles-Secqueville (10) | 2–2 (4–5 p) | Inter Odon FC (9) |
| 78. | AS Petiville (10) | 0–8 | CS Gravenchon (8) |
| 79. | RC Havrais (10) | 3–1 (a.e.t.) | US Cap de Caux (8) |
| 80. | Le Havre FC 2012 (9) | 2–3 | Gainneville AC (8) |
| 81. | FC Gruchet-le-Valasse (10) | 0–5 | CS Honfleur (8) |
| 82. | Vieux-Manoir FC (11) | 2–4 | AS Canton d'Argueil (9) |
| 83. | FC Vexin Sud (11) | 0–4 | AS Val-de-Reuil/Vaudreuil/Poses (8) |
| 84. | St Maclou-Boulleville FC (11) | 1–6 | CS Beaumont-le-Roger (10) |
| 85. | AL St Michel Évreux (10) | 2–0 | Navarre FC (9) |
| 86. | CS Lyonsais (12) | 2–7 | FC Garennes-Bueil-La Couture-Breuilpont (9) |
| 87. | FCI Bel Air (10) | 0–1 | FA Roumois (9) |
| 88. | La Croix Vallée d'Eure (10) | 5–4 | FAC Alizay (8) |
| 89. | FCO Grosley-sur-Risle (11) | 1–3 | SC Bernay (8) |
| 90. | AS Vallée de l'Andelle (11) | 0–4 | US Conches (8) |
| 91. | ES Angerville/Baux-Ste Croix/Plessis-Grohan/Ventes (11) | 0–2 | FC Illiers-l'Évêque (8) |
| 92. | Beuzeville AC (11) | 1–3 | FC Pays du Neubourg (8) |
| 93. | AS Courcelles (10) | 2–3 | ES Vallée de l'Oison (8) |
| 94. | Fusion Charentonne St Aubin (11) | 2–1 | FC Seine-Eure (8) |
| 95. | Campigny FC (12) | 0–2 | FC Val de Risle (8) |
| 96. | AS Ailly-Fontaine-Bellenger (11) | 3–9 | ES Normanville (8) |
| 97. | US Étrépagny (10) | 0–7 | Club Andelle Pîtres (8) |
| 98. | FC Harcourt (12) | 0–3 | CA Pont-Audemer (8) |
| 99. | AS St Élier (11) | 1–4 | US Rugles (8) |
| 100. | US Cormeilles-Lieurey (11) | 0–2 | FC Serquigny-Nassandres (9) |
| 101. | ASC Igoville (11) | 1–4 | St Sébastien Foot (8) |
| 102. | AS Vièvre (10) | 1–4 | SC Thiberville (8) |
| 103. | AS Angerville-l'Orcher (10) | 6–0 | ESI St Antoine (9) |
| 104. | US Godervillais (9) | 0–2 | US Épouville (8) |
| 105. | FC Bréauté-Bretteville (10) | 1–3 | Le Havre Caucriauville Sportif (8) |
| 106. | AS St Vigor-d'Ymonville (10) | 4–2 | AS Ste Adresse But (9) |
| 107. | Athleti'Caux FC (8) | 2–3 (a.e.t.) | SS Gournay (8) |
| 108. | FC Criquiers (12) | 1–5 | FC Varenne (10) |
| 109. | AS Buchy (10) | 0–3 | Plateau de Quincampoix FC (9) |
| 110. | FC Nord Ouest (10) | 0–8 | FC Neufchâtel (8) |
| 111. | FC Anneville-Manéhouville-Crosville (9) | 2–1 (a.e.t.) | AS Mesnières-en-Bray (10) |
| 112. | US St Jean-du-Cardonnay-Fresquiennes (11) | 2–5 | FC St Étienne-du-Rouvray (8) |
| 113. | US Houppeville (10) | 1–6 | Stade Grand Quevilly (8) |
| 114. | Amicale Malaunay (10) | – (Note: Match abandoned with the scoreline 2–0. Grand-Couronne FC penalised. Amicale Malaunay qualify.) | Grand-Couronne FC (8) |
| 115. | AC Bray Est (9) | 1–1 (3–1 p) | AS Gournay-en-Bray (8) |
| 116. | ASPTT Rouen (10) | 0–3 | Amicale Houlmoise Bondevillaise FC (8) |
| 117. | Olympique Darnétal (9) | 1–4 | FC St Julien Petit Quevilly (8) |
| 118. | AL Tourville-la-Rivière (10) | 0–7 | Mont-St-Aignan FC (8) |
| 119. | US Envermeu (10) | 0–3 | Entente Vienne et Saâne (8) |
| 120. | ES Janval (9) | 0–3 | AS Tréport (8) |
| 121. | St Aubin United FC (10) | 2–2 (0–3 p) | FC Offranville (8) |
| 122. | CA Longuevillais (9) | 0–3 | Neuville AC (8) |
| 123. | FC Tôtes (9) | 0–2 | AJC Bosc-le-Hard (8) |
| 124. | US Héricourt (10) | 1–4 | Cany FC (8) |
| 125. | Yerville FC (10) | 1–0 | ES Arques (8) |
| 126. | ES Étouteville-Yvecrique (11) | 1–2 (a.e.t.) | Stade Valeriquais (8) |
| 127. | US Auffay (9) | 1–3 | AS Ourville (8) |
| 128. | RC Étalondes (10) | 0–7 | Eu FC (10) |
| 129. | St Riquier GASEG (10) | 1–2 | Entente Motteville/Croix-Mare (10) |
| 130. | AS Allouville-Bellefosse (11) | 1–3 | Boucle de Seine (9) |
| 131. | US Ste Marie-des-Champs (9) | 1–1 (4–3 p) | US Vatteville Brotonne (10) |
| 132. | US des Vallées (10) | 3–3 (5–6 p) | FC Fréville-Bouville SIVOM (9) |
| 133. | Entente St Martin/St Pierre (11) | 4–1 | US Veauville-lès-Baons (10) |
| 134. | AS St Pierre-de-Varengeville (9) | 0–4 | FC Barentinois (9) |
| 135. | US Paluel (11) | 0–3 | AS Vallée du Dun (11) |
| 136. | US Londinières (10) | 0–9 | ES Plateau-Foucarmont-Réalcamp (8) |
| 137. | US Doudeville (9) | 2–3 | AS Ouvillaise (8) |
| 138. | US Crielloise (10) | 0–0 (3–4 p) | FC Petit Caux (10) |
| 139. | FC Biville-la-Baignarde (11) | 1–2 | US Bacqueville-Pierreville (10) |
| 140. | Belleville FC (10) | 4–1 | ES Aumaloise (9) |
| 141. | Olympique Belmesnil (10) | 1–2 | US Normande 76 (9) |
| 142. | FC Hattenville Coeur de Caux (10) | 0–3 | AS Sassetot-Thérouldeville (10) |

=== Second round ===
These matches were played on 31 August and 1 September 2019, with one game on 8 September 2019.

Second round results: Normandy
| Tie no | Home team (tier) | Score | Away team (tier) |
|---|---|---|---|
| 1. | US St Quentin-sur-le-Homme (9) | 0–6 | AS Jullouville-Sartilly (8) |
| 2. | FC Val-St Père (9) | 1–3 | AS Brécey (8) |
| 3. | St Hilaire-Virey-Landelles (8) | 4–4 (4–3 p) | CS Villedieu (7) |
| 4. | US St Pairaise (8) | 2–0 | USCO Sourdeval (8) |
| 5. | Espérance St Jean-des-Champs (8) | 0–2 | Agneaux FC (7) |
| 6. | US La Glacerie (10) | 4–2 | US Côte-des-Isles (8) |
| 7. | FC Val de Saire (8) | 2–1 | US Ouest Cotentin (7) |
| 8. | Entente Le Lorey-Hautville-Feugères (11) | 1–1 (3–4 p) | CA Pontois (9) |
| 9. | ES Gouville-sur-Mer (10) | 0–5 | ES Coutances (7) |
| 10. | US Roncey-Cerisy (11) | 2–9 | FC 3 Rivières (8) |
| 11. | US Ste Croix St Lô (9) | 3–0 | Tessy-Moyon Sports (9) |
| 12. | US Lessay (11) | 2–4 | ES St Sauveur-La Ronde-Haye (9) |
| 13. | ES Hébécrevon (10) | 1–2 | CS Carentan (7) |
| 14. | FC Agon-Coutainville (9) | 2–1 | Créances SF (8) |
| 15. | Patriote St Jamaise (9) | 0–4 | US Ducey-Isigny (6) |
| 16. | AS Tourlaville (6) | 8–0 (Note: Tie reversed with the agreement of both clubs.) | FC Digosville (10) |
| 17. | Elan Tocqueville (8) | 2–3 | UC Bricquebec (8) |
| 18. | ES Plain (9) | 3–1 | AS Valognes (8) |
| 19. | AS Querqueville (9) | 1–5 | ES Pointe Hague (7) |
| 20. | SCU Douve Divette (8) | 1–6 | FC Équeurdreville-Hainneville (7) |
| 21. | Soligny-Aspres-Moulins (9) | 0–5 | AS Courteille Alençon (7) |
| 22. | FC Pays Aiglon (8) | 0–3 | FC Argentan (7) |
| 23. | OC Briouze (8) | 0–3 | FC Flers (6) |
| 24. | US Athis (8) | 1–1 (5–4 p) | Espérance Condé-sur-Sarthe (8) |
| 25. | US Andaine (8) | 2–0 | Jeunesse Fertoise Bagnoles (7) |
| 26. | US Mêloise (11) | 0–0 (2–4 p) | AS Boucé (9) |
| 27. | AS Berd'huis Foot (8) | 5–1 | Avenir St Germain-du-Corbéis (9) |
| 28. | US Mortagnaise (8) | 5–0 | AS Gacé (9) |
| 29. | US Ménil-de-Briouze (10) | 0–5 | SL Petruvien (9) |
| 30. | US Putanges (11) | 1–7 | AS La Selle-la-Forge (8) |
| 31. | Réveil St Germain Courseulles-sur-Mer (8) | 0–6 | AS Villers Houlgate Côte Fleurie (7) |
| 32. | CS Honfleur (8) | 2–5 | Maladrerie OS (6) |
| 33. | US Guérinière (9) | 1–9 | SU Dives-Cabourg (6) |
| 34. | ES Thury-Harcourt (8) | 0–2 | Bayeux FC (6) |
| 35. | ES Val de l'Orne (9) | 0–4 | ASPTT Caen (6) |
| 36. | US Pont-l'Évêque (8) | 1–4 | AS Trouville-Deauville (6) |
| 37. | Lystrienne Sportive (9) | 0–4 | JS Douvres (6) |
| 38. | US Tilly-sur-Seulles (10) | 0–5 | USON Mondeville (6) |
| 39. | Stade St Sauverais (8) | 2–0 | AS Potigny-Villers-Canivet-Ussy (7) |
| 40. | JS Audrieu (9) | 3–3 (2–4 p) | Inter Odon FC (9) |
| 41. | ESI May-sur-Orne (9) | 0–3 | Bourguébus-Soliers FC (7) |
| 42. | ES Livarotaise (8) | 2–6 | ESFC Falaise (7) |
| 43. | AC Démouville-Cuverville (10) | 2–1 | Cingal FC (8) |
| 44. | FC Baie de l'Orne (8) | 1–2 | US Villers-Bocage (8) |
| 45. | JS Colleville (8) | 1–2 | Muance FC (8) |
| 46. | Dozulé FC (9) | 0–2 | CL Colombellois (10) |
| 47. | US Cheux-St Manvieu-Norrey (9) | 2–1 | USI Bessin Nord (8) |
| 48. | CS Orbecquois-Vespèrois (9) | 5–1 | FC Moyaux (9) |
| 49. | AS St Aignan-de-Cramesnil/Langannerie (11) | 0–3 | ES Carpiquet (8) |
| 50. | AS Vaudry-Truttemer (8) | 1–4 | LC Bretteville-sur-Odon (7) |
| 51. | FC Thaon-Bretteville-Le Fresne (8) | 2–2 (3–4 p) | CA Lisieux (7) |
| 52. | SC Hérouvillais (8) | 2–2 (0–3 p) | AJS Ouistreham (7) |
| 53. | US Trévières (10) | 0–5 | AS Ifs (7) |
| 54. | FC Troarn (8) | 1–0 | USC Mézidon (7) |
| 55. | AS St Vigor-le-Grand (8) | 0–1 | AS Verson (7) |
| 56. | Entente Motteville/Croix-Mare (10) | 1–2 | CS Gravenchon (8) |
| 57. | AS Angerville-l'Orcher (10) | 0–7 | US Bolbec (7) |
| 58. | Gainneville AC (8) | 6–3 (a.e.t.) | AS Montivilliers (8) |
| 59. | RC Havrais (10) | 4–2 | SC Octevillais (7) |
| 60. | FC Petit Caux (10) | 1–3 (a.e.t.) | AS Tréport (8) |
| 61. | US Épouville (8) | 0–2 | Olympique Havrais Tréfileries-Neiges (7) |
| 62. | AS St Vigor-d'Ymonville (10) | 0–3 | CSSM Le Havre (6) |
| 63. | SS Gournay (8) | 2–5 | SC Frileuse (7) |
| 64. | AJC Bosc-le-Hard (8) | 0–1 | ES Tourville (7) |
| 65. | Entente St Martin/St Pierre (11) | 1–2 | St Romain AC (7) |
| 66. | FC Varenne (10) | 1–3 | Neuville AC (8) |
| 67. | AS Fauvillaise (8) | 1–3 | ES Mont-Gaillard (7) |
| 68. | Le Havre Caucriauville Sportif (8) | 0–0 (1–4 p) | US Lillebonne (8) |
| 69. | AS Sassetot-Thérouldeville (10) | 0–4 | Cany FC (8) |
| 70. | AS Ouvillaise (8) | 1–3 | Olympique Pavillais (6) |
| 71. | Entente Vienne et Saâne (8) | 1–2 | US Luneraysienne (7) |
| 72. | AS Vallée du Dun (11) | 0–10 | Yvetot AC (6) |
| 73. | FC Anneville-Manéhouville-Crosville (9) | 0–10 | JS St Nicolas-d'Aliermont (7) |
| 74. | Belleville FC (10) | 0–3 | USF Fécamp (7) |
| 75. | AC Bray Est (9) | 0–3 | FC Neufchâtel (8) |
| 76. | FC Barentinois (9) | 1–2 | FUSC Bois-Guillaume (6) |
| 77. | US Bacqueville-Pierreville (10) | 2–1 | Stade Valeriquais (8) |
| 78. | FC Fréville-Bouville SIVOM (9) | 3–1 | FC Le Trait-Duclair (7) |
| 79. | Eu FC (10) | 0–7 | ES Plateau-Foucarmont-Réalcamp (8) |
| 80. | US Ste Marie-des-Champs (9) | 0–4 | AS Ourville (8) |
| 81. | US Normande 76 (9) | 3–2 | FC Offranville (8) |
| 82. | Boucle de Seine (9) | 4–1 | Yerville FC (10) |
| 83. | SC Thiberville (8) | 1–1 (6–5 p) | CS Beaumont-le-Roger (10) |
| 84. | Amicale Houlmoise Bondevillaise FC (8) | 0–2 | Rouen Sapins FC Grand-Mare (7) |
| 85. | FC Pays du Neubourg (8) | 2–3 | AL Déville-Maromme (6) |
| 86. | CA Pont-Audemer (8) | 0–1 | FC St Julien Petit Quevilly (8) |
| 87. | AL St Michel Évreux (10) | 1–2 | US Rugles (8) |
| 88. | FC Eure Madrie Seine (7) | 0–3 | US Mesnil-Esnard/Franqueville (6) |
| 89. | Fusion Charentonne St Aubin (11) | 0–4 | FC Illiers-l'Évêque (8) |
| 90. | US Conches (8) | 3–2 (a.e.t.) | Romilly/Pont-St Pierre FC (6) |
| 91. | AS Canton d'Argueil (9) | 1–0 | Plateau de Quincampoix FC (9) |
| 92. | FC Serquigny-Nassandres (9) | 5–3 | St Aubin FC (7) |
| 93. | FC Val de Risle (8) | 1–3 | GCO Bihorel (7) |
| 94. | ES Normanville (8) | 1–3 | Saint Marcel Foot (7) |
| 95. | Club Andelle Pîtres (8) | 0–3 | FC Gisors Vexin Normand (7) |
| 96. | La Croix Vallée d'Eure (10) | 1–0 | Amicale Malaunay (10) |
| 97. | SC Bernay (8) | 2–1 | Stade Porte Normande Vernon (7) |
| 98. | FC St Étienne-du-Rouvray (8) | 1–0 | FA Roumois (9) |
| 99. | US Gasny (8) | 1–4 | Caudebec-St Pierre FC (7) |
| 100. | FC Bonsecours-St Léger (8) | 0–2 | AS Madrillet Château Blanc (6) |
| 101. | FC Garennes-Bueil-La Couture-Breuilpont (9) | 1–1 (3–2 p) | ES Vallée de l'Oison (8) |
| 102. | AS Val-de-Reuil/Vaudreuil/Poses (8) | 3–2 | St Sébastien Foot (8) |
| 103. | Mont-St-Aignan FC (8) | 1–0 | Stade Sottevillais CC (6) |
| 104. | Stade Grand Quevilly (8) | 0–1 | CO Cléon (7) |

=== Third round ===
These matches were played on 14 and 15 September 2019, with one to be replayed on 22 September 2019.

Third round results: Normandy
| Tie no | Home team (tier) | Score | Away team (tier) |
|---|---|---|---|
| 1. | SU Dives-Cabourg (6) | 4–1 | AS Trouville-Deauville (6) |
| 2. | ASPTT Caen (6) | 3–1 | Bourguébus-Soliers FC (7) |
| 3. | FC Fréville-Bouville SIVOM (9) | 2–4 | Olympique Havrais Tréfileries-Neiges (7) |
| 4. | US Bolbec (7) | 3–4 | USF Fécamp (7) |
| 5. | Cany FC (8) | 5–4 | Olympique Pavillais (6) |
| 6. | RC Havrais (10) | 2–6 | CSSM Le Havre (6) |
| 7. | CO Cléon (7) | 0–3 | Grand-Quevilly FC (5) |
| 8. | St Romain AC (7) | 3–3 (3–4 p) | CS Gravenchon (8) |
| 9. | Rouen Sapins FC Grand-Mare (7) | 4–2 | FC St Étienne-du-Rouvray (8) |
| 10. | Saint Marcel Foot (7) | 2–1 | LC Bretteville-sur-Odon (7) |
| 11. | FC Serquigny-Nassandres (9) | 0–2 | Évreux FC 27 (5) |
| 12. | SC Bernay (8) | 4–1 | SC Thiberville (8) |
| 13. | La Croix Vallée d'Eure (10) | 1–6 | ESM Gonfreville (5) |
| 14. | FC Garennes-Bueil-La Couture-Breuilpont (9) | 2–1 | AS Val-de-Reuil/Vaudreuil/Poses (8) |
| 15. | FC St Julien Petit Quevilly (8) | 1–4 | US Mesnil-Esnard/Franqueville (6) |
| 16. | US Lillebonne (8) | 1–4 | Yvetot AC (6) |
| 17. | ES Tourville (7) | 2–1 | US Luneraysienne (7) |
| 18. | US Normande 76 (9) | 1–2 | Mont-St-Aignan FC (8) |
| 19. | AS Ourville (8) | 6–1 | Gainneville AC (8) |
| 20. | SC Frileuse (7) | 1–4 | AS Villers Houlgate Côte Fleurie (7) |
| 21. | AL Déville-Maromme (6) | 5–0 | AJS Ouistreham (7) |
| 22. | ES Mont-Gaillard (7) | 7–1 | Stade St Sauverais (8) |
| 23. | FUSC Bois-Guillaume (6) | 1–2 (Note: Original match abandoned due to floodlight failure. Ordered to be replayed.) | FC Dieppe (5) |
| 24. | FC Neufchâtel (8) | 2–1 | AS Madrillet Château Blanc (6) |
| 25. | Neuville AC (8) | 2–4 (a.e.t.) | AS Tréport (8) |
| 26. | FC Gisors Vexin Normand (7) | 0–2 | ES Plateau-Foucarmont-Réalcamp (8) |
| 27. | US Bacqueville-Pierreville (10) | 2–3 | GCO Bihorel (7) |
| 28. | Boucle de Seine (9) | 0–5 | Caudebec-St Pierre FC (7) |
| 29. | AS Canton d'Argueil (9) | 2–4 | JS St Nicolas-d'Aliermont (7) |
| 30. | US Conches (8) | 0–4 | Pacy Ménilles RC (5) |
| 31. | US Rugles (8) | 5–2 (a.e.t.) | FC Illiers-l'Évêque (8) |
| 32. | AS Courteille Alençon (7) | 2–1 | US Andaine (8) |
| 33. | St Hilaire-Virey-Landelles (8) | 1–2 (a.e.t.) | US Ducey-Isigny (6) |
| 34. | AS Brécey (8) | 1–4 | SL Petruvien (9) |
| 35. | AS Jullouville-Sartilly (8) | 0–4 | AF Virois (5) |
| 36. | ES St Sauveur-La Ronde-Haye (9) | 0–5 | AS Cherbourg Football (5) |
| 37. | US Ste Croix St Lô (9) | 1–4 | FC Agon-Coutainville (9) |
| 38. | FC Val de Saire (8) | 3–3 (9–8 p) | AS Tourlaville (6) |
| 39. | CS Carentan (7) | 2–2 (2–3 p) | FC Saint-Lô Manche (5) |
| 40. | UC Bricquebec (8) | 2–4 | Bayeux FC (6) |
| 41. | US La Glacerie (10) | 3–0 | ES Plain (9) |
| 42. | FC 3 Rivières (8) | 0–4 | ES Pointe Hague (7) |
| 43. | AS Boucé (9) | 0–2 | FC Flers (6) |
| 44. | US Athis (8) | 1–3 | US Alençon (5) |
| 45. | AS La Selle-la-Forge (8) | 2–1 | US St Pairaise (8) |
| 46. | Inter Odon FC (9) | 4–5 | ESFC Falaise (7) |
| 47. | USON Mondeville (6) | 0–3 | AG Caennaise (5) |
| 48. | Muance FC (8) | 0–3 | AS Berd'huis Foot (8) |
| 49. | CL Colombellois (10) | 0–1 | AS Ifs (7) |
| 50. | FC Troarn (8) | 0–1 | Maladrerie OS (6) |
| 51. | CA Lisieux (7) | 2–1 | US Mortagnaise (8) |
| 52. | AC Démouville-Cuverville (10) | 0–4 | AS Verson (7) |
| 53. | CS Orbecquois-Vespèrois (9) | 2–5 | FC Argentan (7) |
| 54. | ES Carpiquet (8) | 1–2 | Agneaux FC (7) |
| 55. | US Cheux-St Manvieu-Norrey (9) | 1–4 | JS Douvres (6) |
| 56. | US Villers-Bocage (8) | 4–2 | CA Pontois (9) |
| 57. | FC Équeurdreville-Hainneville (7) | 3–1 | ES Coutances (7) |

=== Fourth round ===
These matches were played on 28 and 29 September 2019.

Fourth round results: Normandy
| Tie no | Home team (tier) | Score | Away team (tier) |
|---|---|---|---|
| 1. | AS Ifs (7) | 2–1 (a.e.t.) | ES Pointe Hague (7) |
| 2. | ES Mont-Gaillard (7) | 2–1 | AS Courteille Alençon (7) |
| 3. | FC Argentan (7) | 0–1 | AG Caennaise (5) |
| 4. | AS Berd'huis Foot (8) | 0–3 | SU Dives-Cabourg (6) |
| 5. | FC Garennes-Bueil-La Couture-Breuilpont (9) | 2–2 (3–4 p) | Rouen Sapins FC Grand-Mare (7) |
| 6. | US Mesnil-Esnard/Franqueville (6) | 0–1 | FC Rouen (4) |
| 7. | Cany FC (8) | 2–2 (4–2 p) | Saint Marcel Foot (7) |
| 8. | Pacy Ménilles RC (5) | 0–2 | Grand-Quevilly FC (5) |
| 9. | AS Tréport (8) | 2–0 | Mont-St-Aignan FC (8) |
| 10. | USF Fécamp (7) | 3–1 | AS Ourville (8) |
| 11. | GCO Bihorel (7) | 1–4 | AL Déville-Maromme (6) |
| 12. | ES Plateau-Foucarmont-Réalcamp (8) | 4–0 | JS St Nicolas-d'Aliermont (7) |
| 13. | Yvetot AC (6) | 4–5 | ES Tourville (7) |
| 14. | FC Neufchâtel (8) | 0–1 | FC Dieppe (5) |
| 15. | SC Bernay (8) | 0–2 | US Alençon (5) |
| 16. | Évreux FC 27 (5) | 1–1 (5–4 p) | CMS Oissel (4) |
| 17. | CS Gravenchon (8) | 3–3 (4–3 p) | US Rugles (8) |
| 18. | US Villers-Bocage (8) | 1–0 | Maladrerie OS (6) |
| 19. | AS Cherbourg Football (5) | 5–1 | US Ducey-Isigny (6) |
| 20. | SL Petruvien (9) | 1–7 | ASPTT Caen (6) |
| 21. | FC Agon-Coutainville (9) | 0–5 | US Granville (4) |
| 22. | FC Val de Saire (8) | 2–1 | FC Flers (6) |
| 23. | US La Glacerie (10) | 0–11 | FC Saint-Lô Manche (5) |
| 24. | AS La Selle-la-Forge (8) | 1–5 | AF Virois (5) |
| 25. | Bayeux FC (6) | 1–1 (4–5 p) | AS Verson (7) |
| 26. | Agneaux FC (7) | 3–2 (a.e.t.) | FC Équeurdreville-Hainneville (7) |
| 27. | Caudebec-St Pierre FC (7) | 0–1 | CA Lisieux (7) |
| 28. | AS Villers Houlgate Côte Fleurie (7) | 3–1 | Olympique Havrais Tréfileries-Neiges (7) |
| 29. | ESFC Falaise (7) | 2–0 | CSSM Le Havre (6) |
| 30. | JS Douvres (6) | 1–3 | ESM Gonfreville (5) |

=== Fifth round ===
These matches were played on 12 and 13 October 2019.

Fifth round results: Normandy
| Tie no | Home team (tier) | Score | Away team (tier) |
|---|---|---|---|
| 1. | AS Ifs (7) | 0–5 | US Alençon (5) |
| 2. | SU Dives-Cabourg (6) | 3–2 (a.e.t.) | AS Villers Houlgate Côte Fleurie (7) |
| 3. | Agneaux FC (7) | 2–4 | AG Caennaise (5) |
| 4. | US Villers-Bocage (8) | 0–2 | US Avranches (3) |
| 5. | FC Val de Saire (8) | 2–7 | US Granville (4) |
| 6. | ASPTT Caen (6) | 1–2 | AS Verson (7) |
| 7. | AF Virois (5) | 4–2 | FC Saint-Lô Manche (5) |
| 8. | ESFC Falaise (7) | 2–3 (a.e.t.) | AS Cherbourg Football (5) |
| 9. | Cany FC (8) | 2–5 | ESM Gonfreville (5) |
| 10. | CS Gravenchon (8) | 0–9 | FC Dieppe (5) |
| 11. | Rouen Sapins FC Grand-Mare (7) | 0–4 | US Quevilly-Rouen (3) |
| 12. | ES Tourville (7) | 0–6 | FC Rouen (4) |
| 13. | AS Tréport (8) | 1–8 | Grand-Quevilly FC (5) |
| 14. | CA Lisieux (7) | 0–3 | Évreux FC 27 (5) |
| 15. | AL Déville-Maromme (6) | 6–3 | ES Mont-Gaillard (7) |
| 16. | ES Plateau-Foucarmont-Réalcamp (8) | 2–2 (11–12 p) | USF Fécamp (7) |

=== Sixth round ===
These matches were played on 26 and 27 October 2019.

Sixth round results: Normandy
| Tie no | Home team (tier) | Score | Away team (tier) |
|---|---|---|---|
| 1. | FC Dieppe (5) | 2–0 | US Alençon (5) |
| 2. | USF Fécamp (7) | 0–1 | AG Caennaise (5) |
| 3. | US Avranches (3) | 0–2 | FC Rouen (4) |
| 4. | Évreux FC 27 (5) | 3–0 | SU Dives-Cabourg (6) |
| 5. | AS Cherbourg Football (5) | 1–2 | AF Virois (5) |
| 6. | AL Déville-Maromme (6) | 1–2 | US Granville (4) |
| 7. | AS Verson (7) | 0–3 | ESM Gonfreville (5) |
| 8. | Grand-Quevilly FC (5) | 0–2 | US Quevilly-Rouen (3) |
