= 2017–18 Championnat National 3 =

Championnat National 3
- Season: 2017–18
- Champions: Vannes
- Promoted: 12 teams (see Season outcomes section)
- Relegated: 38 teams (see Season outcomes section)
- Top goalscorer: 26 goals Michel Gaye, Avoine Chinon
- Biggest home win: Évreux 10–0 Dives-Cabourg; Group J, Round 25, 12 May 2018
- Biggest away win: Saint-Vit 0–8 Dijon (res); Group E, Round 2, 27 August 2017
- Highest scoring: 10 goals Fabrègues 8–2 Castanet; Group H, Round 23, 21 April 2018; Selongey 9–1 Clémenceau Besançon; Group E, Round 26, 6 May 2018; Évreux 10–0 Dives-Cabourg; Group J, Round 25, 12 May 2018; Cannes 9–1 Île-Rousse; Group D, Round 26, 19 May 2018
- All statistics correct as of 08:58, 29 May 2018 (UTC).

The 2017–18 Championnat National 3 is the first season of the fifth tier in the French football league system in its current format. The competition is contested by 171 clubs split geographically across 12 groups of 14 teams, 1 group of 15 teams and 1 group of 16 teams. The teams include amateur clubs (although a few are semi-professional) and the reserve teams of professional clubs.

== Teams ==
On 13 July, the FFF ratified the constitution of the competition, and published the groups as follows:

- 90 teams that did not finish in a promotion or relegation place in the 2016–17 Championnat de France Amateur 2 groups.
- 1 team that finished in a promotion place in the 2016–17 Championnat de France Amateur 2 groups, but was subsequently denied promotion. (AS Saint-Ouen-l'Aumône)
- 9 teams relegated from 2016–17 Championnat de France Amateur after any reprieves (Plabennec, Nantes (res), Châteaubriant, Wasquehal, Dieppe, Auxerre (res), Mulhouse, Le Pontet and Montpellier (res))
- 67 teams promoted from Regional Division d'Honneur by finishing in a promotion position.
- 1 team promoted from Regional Division d'Honneur to replace Calais RUFC who should have been relegated from 2016–17 Championnat de France Amateur but who were given an administrative relegation by the FFF, and as a consequence will play in the top level of regional football in 2017–18. (Saint-Amand)
- 1 team promoted from Regional Division d'Honneur to replace Paulhan-Pézenas, who were reprieved from 2016–17 Championnat de France Amateur relegation due to AS Saint-Ouen-l'Aumône being denied promotion from 2016–17 Championnat de France Amateur 2. (Narbonne)

On 10 August, the FFF announced that SC Bastia would be denied entry to 2017–18 Championnat National due to financial issues. The club will therefore take the place of its reserve team in Championnat National 3.

On 16 August, the FFF admitted Clémenceau Besançon to the competition. The team had previously been excluded due to financial issues, but successfully appealed the ruling.

On 22 September, the FFF admitted CSO Amnéville to the competition. Amnéville had previously been denied promotion from the Regional Division d'Honneur for financial reasons, and had already started their programme of fixtures in that division.

== Promotion and relegation ==
If eligible, the top team in each group will be promoted to Championnat National 2. If a team finishing top of the group is ineligible, the next eligible team in that group will be promoted.

Generally, three teams will be relegated from each group to the top league in their region, subject to reprieves. Extra relegation places will be enforced if more than one team is relegated to a specific group from Championnat National 2, and one less may be enforced if no team is relegated to a specific group. Special cases exist for those groups which started the year with more than the standard 14 teams.

=== Grand Est (Group F) relegation ===
At least four and up to seven teams will be relegated from Group F, depending on the number of teams from this region relegated from Championnat National 2.

- If no teams from Grand Est region relegated from Championnat National 2, four teams relegated from Group F
- If one team from Grand Est region relegated from Championnat National 2, five teams relegated from Group F
- If two, three or four teams from Grand Est region relegated from Championnat National 2, six teams relegated from Group F
- If five (maximum possible) teams from Grand Est region relegated from Championnat National 2, seven teams relegated from Group F

== League tables ==
=== Group A: Nouvelle-Aquitaine ===
Pos	Team	Pld	W	D	L	GF	GA	GD	Pts	Promotion or relegation
1	Bordeaux (res) (P)	26	17	4	5	41	20	+21	55	Promotion to National 2
2	Bayonne	26	16	6	4	48	19	+29	53 (Note: Bayonne were penalised by the FFF for fielding too many players transferred outside the transfer window in the game at Mérignac Arlac on 15 April 2018. The original scoreline was 0–1. The revised scoreline is 3–0. Bayonne are penalised by 1 point.)	
3	Niort (res)	26	13	7	6	55	32	+23	46	
4	Anglet	26	12	8	6	41	30	+11	44	
5	Angoulême	26	11	9	6	49	32	+17	42	
6	Mérignac Arlac	26	9	9	8	36	29	+7	36	
7	Pau (res)	26	11	3	12	33	40	−7	36	
8	Bressuire	26	10	6	10	34	38	−4	36	
9	Poitiers	26	9	7	10	38	32	+6	34	
10	Chauray	26	8	8	10	24	31	−7	32	
11	Lège Cap Ferret	26	7	9	10	29	29	0	30	
12	Libourne (R)	26	6	5	15	31	47	−16	23	Relegation to Regional 1
13	Cozes (R)	26	6	3	17	23	58	−35	21	Relegation to Regional 1
14	Feytiat (R)	26	3	4	19	18	63	−45	13	Relegation to Regional 1

Source: fff.fr
Rules for classification: 1) points; 2) head-to-head results; 3) head-to-head goal difference; 4) goal difference; 5) number of goals scored; 6) fair play points; 7) draw
(P) Promoted; (R) Relegated

=== Group B: Pays de la Loire ===
Pos	Team	Pld	W	D	L	GF	GA	GD	Pts	Promotion or relegation
1	Nantes (res) (P)	26	17	5	4	43	18	+25	56	Promotion to National 2
2	Sablé	26	16	4	6	41	24	+17	52	
3	Les Herbiers (res)	26	12	5	9	34	30	+4	41	
4	Angers (res)	26	10	8	8	35	24	+11	38	
5	Vertou	26	10	7	9	33	30	+3	37	
6	La Roche	26	10	6	10	33	36	−3	36	
7	Poiré-sur-Vie (Note: Poiré-sur-Vie entered administration in January 2018 and judicial liquidation in February 2018. By FFF rules they are administratively relegated from National 3, subject to any appeal. La Flèche are therefore reprieved from relegation.) (R)	26	9	8	9	26	29	−3	35	Relegation to Regional 1
8	Laval (res)	26	10	5	11	31	35	−4	35	
9	Challans	26	9	7	10	27	25	+2	34	
10	Châteaubriant	26	8	7	11	38	36	+2	31	
11	La Suze	26	8	6	12	39	43	−4	30	
12	La Flèche	26	7	8	11	32	39	−7	29	
13	Changé (R)	26	7	8	11	25	36	−11	29	Relegation to Regional 1
14	Mulsanne-Teloché (R)	26	4	6	16	20	52	−32	18	Relegation to Regional 1

Source: fff.fr
Rules for classification: 1) points; 2) head-to-head results; 3) head-to-head goal difference; 4) goal difference; 5) number of goals scored; 6) fair play points; 7) draw
(P) Promoted; (R) Relegated

=== Group C: Centre-Val de Loire ===
Pos	Team	Pld	W	D	L	GF	GA	GD	Pts	Promotion or relegation
1	Blois (P)	26	18	5	3	53	20	+33	59	Promotion to National 2
2	Avoine Chinon	26	17	6	3	59	15	+44	57	
3	Chartres Horizon	26	11	10	5	27	20	+7	43	
4	Dreux (Note: Dreux were administratively relegated to the Regional League by the FFF Region of Centre-Val de Loire, subject to appeal, on 28 June 2018, due to financial issues. Châteauneuf-sur-Loire are therefore reprieved from relegation.) (R)	26	11	7	8	27	26	+1	40	Relegation to Regional 1
5	Châteauroux (res)	26	10	9	7	39	39	0	38 (Note: Châteauroux (res) were penalised for fielding a suspended player game away at Bourges Foot on 4 November 2017. The original scoreline was 0–1. The revised scoreline is 3–0. Châteauroux (res) were also deducted a point.)	
6	Bourges 18	26	8	11	7	33	34	−1	35	
7	Tours (res)	26	10	5	11	51	46	+5	35	
8	Vierzon	26	8	10	8	36	29	+7	34	
9	Montargis	26	9	6	11	31	44	−13	33	
10	Bourges Foot	26	9	6	11	39	41	−2	30 (Note: On 16 November 2017 Bourges Foot were penalised three points for not entering a team in the Coupe Gambardella in line with the league rules.)	
11	Ouest Tourangeau	26	7	7	12	38	45	−7	28	
12	Orléans (res)	26	7	7	12	39	41	−2	28	
13	Châteauneuf-sur-Loire	26	5	6	15	29	60	−31	18 (Note: On 16 November 2017 Châteauneuf-sur-Loire were penalised three points for not entering a team in the Coupe Gambardella and not entering a team in the U19 or U18 category, in line with the league rules. The club were reprieved from relegation due to the administrative relegation of Dreux.)	
14	Saint-Cyr-sur-Loire (R)	26	3	3	20	37	78	−41	12	Relegation to Regional 1

Source: fff.fr
Rules for classification: 1) points; 2) head-to-head results; 3) head-to-head goal difference; 4) goal difference; 5) number of goals scored; 6) fair play points; 7) draw
(P) Promoted; (R) Relegated

=== Group D: Provence-Alpes-Côte d'Azur-Corsica ===
Pos	Team	Pld	W	D	L	GF	GA	GD	Pts	Promotion or relegation
1	Endoume Marseille (P)	26	17	4	5	49	26	+23	55	Promotion to National 2
2	SC Bastia	26	15	8	3	46	18	+28	53	
3	Cannet	26	11	8	7	48	40	+8	41	
4	AC Ajaccio (res)	26	12	5	9	46	38	+8	41	
5	Saint-Rémoise	26	11	7	8	43	40	+3	40	
6	Le Pontet	26	9	11	6	41	28	+13	38	
7	Lucciana	26	11	5	10	36	40	−4	38	
8	Cannes	26	11	5	10	42	36	+6	38	
9	Gémenos	26	9	10	7	34	28	+6	37	
10	Saint-Jean Beaulieu	26	11	4	11	39	37	+2	37	
11	Aubagne	26	8	12	6	40	27	+13	36	
12	ÉF Bastia	26	3	8	15	22	50	−28	17	
13	Bastia-Borgo (res) (R)	26	4	4	18	26	59	−33	16	Relegation to Regional 1
14	Île-Rousse (R)	26	3	3	20	25	70	−45	12	Relegation to Regional 1

Source: fff.fr
Rules for classification: 1) points; 2) head-to-head results; 3) head-to-head goal difference; 4) goal difference; 5) number of goals scored; 6) fair play points; 7) draw
(P) Promoted; (R) Relegated

=== Group E: Bourgogne-Franche-Comté ===
Pos	Team	Pld	W	D	L	GF	GA	GD	Pts	Promotion or relegation
1	Pontarlier (P)	28	17	7	4	42	24	+18	58	Promotion to National 2
2	Auxerre (res)	28	17	6	5	56	23	+33	57	
3	Racing Besançon	28	16	8	4	44	27	+17	56	
4	Dijon (res)	28	16	7	5	50	22	+28	55	
5	Sochaux (res)	28	16	6	6	55	30	+25	54	
6	Gueugnon	28	15	6	7	59	30	+29	51	
7	Louhans-Cuiseaux	28	14	6	8	55	26	+29	48	
8	Jura Dolois	28	10	8	10	37	41	−4	38	
9	Besançon	28	10	6	12	47	37	+10	36	
10	Avallon	28	8	11	9	36	29	+7	35	
11	Selongey	28	7	6	15	45	51	−6	27	
12	Saint-Apollinaire (R)	28	6	5	17	20	54	−34	23	Relegation to Regional 1
13	Quetigny (R)	28	5	6	17	25	44	−19	21	Relegation to Regional 1
14	Saint-Vit (R)	28	5	3	20	22	74	−52	18	Relegation to Regional 1
15	Clémenceau Besançon (R)	28	1	3	24	24	105	−81	6	Relegation to Regional 1

Source: fff.fr
Rules for classification: 1) points; 2) head-to-head results; 3) head-to-head goal difference; 4) goal difference; 5) number of goals scored; 6) fair play points; 7) draw
(P) Promoted; (R) Relegated

=== Group F: Grand Est ===
Pos	Team	Pld	W	D	L	GF	GA	GD	Pts	Promotion or relegation
1	Haguenau (P)	30	18	6	6	56	29	+27	60	Promotion to National 2
2	Biesheim	30	14	9	7	46	35	+11	51	
3	Troyes (res)	30	15	6	9	51	31	+20	50 (Note: Troyes (res) were penalised for currently unknown reasons following the game against Trémery on 28 April 2018. The original scoreline was 6–1. The revised scoreline is 0–3. Troyes (res) were also deducted a point.)	
4	RC Strasbourg (res)	30	15	6	9	46	33	+13	50 (Note: RC Strasbourg (res) were penalised for currently unknown reasons following the game against Sarre-Union on 29 October 2017. The original scoreline was 1–5. The revised scoreline is 0–5. RC Strasbourg (res) were also deducted a point.)	
5	Amnéville	30	13	8	9	46	34	+12	47	
6	Mulhouse	30	13	7	10	39	32	+7	46	
7	Sarre-Union	30	13	6	11	53	43	+10	45	
8	Épernay	30	13	6	11	42	36	+6	45	
9	Sarreguemines	30	13	6	11	50	40	+10	45	
10	Nancy (res)	30	13	5	12	51	48	+3	44	
11	Metz (res) (R)	30	10	10	10	40	36	+4	40	Relegation to Regional 1
12	Lunéville (R)	30	12	4	14	33	44	−11	39 (Note: Lunéville were penalised after fielding a suspended player in the game against Sarre-Union on 25 November 2017. The original scoreline was 1–1. The revised scoreline is 0–3. Lunéville were also deducted a point.)	Relegation to Regional 1
13	Prix-lès-Mézières (R)	30	8	9	13	30	38	−8	33	Relegation to Regional 1
14	Trémery (R)	30	7	7	16	37	61	−24	27 (Note: Trémery were penalised after fielding a suspended player in their match at Pagny-sur-Moselle on 4 February 2018. The original scoreline was 3–4. The revised scoreline is 3–0, FC Trémery were also deducted a point.)	Relegation to Regional 1
15	Pagny-sur-Moselle (R)	30	5	8	17	31	55	−24	23	Relegation to Regional 1
16	Erstein (R)	30	4	5	21	23	79	−56	16 (Note: Erstein were penalised after their match at home to Nancy (res) on 16 September 2017 was abandoned due to fighting amongst the players. Initially, the league disciplinary commission ruled that the match would be replayed, but the commission of appeal ruled against Erstein. The original scoreline was 0–2. The revised scoreline in 0–3. Erstein were also deducted a point.)	Relegation to Regional 1

Source: fff.fr
Rules for classification: 1) points; 2) head-to-head results; 3) head-to-head goal difference; 4) goal difference; 5) number of goals scored; 6) fair play points; 7) draw
(P) Promoted; (R) Relegated

=== Group H: Occitanie ===
Pos	Team	Pld	W	D	L	GF	GA	GD	Pts	Promotion or relegation
1	Nîmes (res) (P)	26	14	8	4	48	25	+23	50	Promotion to National 2
2	Toulouse (res)	26	12	11	3	37	21	+16	47	
3	Montpellier (res)	26	11	10	5	48	31	+17	43	
4	Canet Roussillon	26	11	10	5	37	29	+8	43	
5	Fabrègues	26	12	6	8	43	28	+15	42	
6	Blagnac	26	9	10	7	29	25	+4	37	
7	Balma	26	9	9	8	36	33	+3	36	
8	Rodéo	26	9	7	10	30	30	0	34	
9	Lozère	26	7	10	9	31	38	−7	31	
10	Agde	26	7	7	12	31	40	−9	28	
11	Alès	26	6	9	11	22	33	−11	27	
12	Narbonne (R)	26	6	6	14	24	42	−18	24	Relegation to Regional 1
13	Castanet (R)	26	5	9	12	21	45	−24	24	Relegation to Regional 1
14	Luzenac (R)	26	5	6	15	24	41	−17	21	Relegation to Regional 1

Source: fff.fr
Rules for classification: 1) points; 2) head-to-head results; 3) head-to-head goal difference; 4) goal difference; 5) number of goals scored; 6) fair play points; 7) draw
(P) Promoted; (R) Relegated

=== Group I: Hauts-de-France ===
Pos	Team	Pld	W	D	L	GF	GA	GD	Pts	Promotion or relegation
1	Feignies Aulnoye (P)	26	19	5	2	41	15	+26	62	Promotion to National 2
2	Grande-Synthe	26	14	6	6	30	19	+11	48	
3	Saint-Quentin	26	13	6	7	45	26	+19	45	
4	Senlis	26	11	6	9	28	26	+2	39	
5	Dunkerque (res)	26	10	8	8	32	31	+1	38	
6	Amiens (res)	26	10	6	10	37	33	+4	36	
7	Tourcoing	26	10	4	12	38	34	+4	34	
8	Chambly (res)	26	8	9	9	26	34	−8	32 (Note: The match between Feignies Aulnoye and Chambly (res) on 2 September 2017, which finished 0–3, was referred to the Hauts-de-France league by Feignies Aulnoye due to Chambly (res) having named too many transferred players on the team sheet. On 5 October 2017 the league Commission Juridique rules that there was insufficient motive to overturn the result. Feignies Aulnoye appealed, and on 9 January 2018 the league appeals committee overturned the original decision, awarding the match to Feignies Aulnoye by the score of 3–0, and deducting a penalty point from Chambly (res).)	
9	Maubeuge	26	8	7	11	24	31	−7	31	
10	Boulogne (res)	26	7	10	9	25	33	−8	31	
11	Wasquehal (R)	26	7	9	10	29	30	−1	30	Relegation to Regional 1
12	Saint-Amand (R)	26	7	9	10	24	31	−7	30	Relegation to Regional 1
13	Roye Noyon (R)	26	5	6	15	24	41	−17	21	Relegation to Regional 1
14	Ailly-sur-Somme (R)	26	2	11	13	20	39	−19	17	Relegation to Regional 1

Updated to match(es) played on 26 May 2018. Source: fff.fr
Rules for classification: 1) points; 2) head-to-head results; 3) head-to-head goal difference; 4) goal difference; 5) number of goals scored; 6) fair play points; 7) draw
(P) Promoted; (R) Relegated

=== Group J: Normandy ===
Pos	Team	Pld	W	D	L	GF	GA	GD	Pts	Promotion or relegation
1	Oissel (P)	26	18	5	3	52	26	+26	59	Promotion to National 2
2	Mondeville (Note: Mondeville were administratively relegated to the Regional League by the FFF Region of Normandy, subject to appeal, on 21 June 2018, due to financial issues. Bayeux are therefore reprieved from relegation.) (R)	26	18	2	6	46	19	+27	56	Relegation to Regional 1
3	Évreux	26	14	4	8	51	27	+24	46	
4	Saint-Lô	26	12	7	7	43	26	+17	43	
5	SM Caen (res)	26	12	2	12	44	35	+9	38	
6	Quevilly-Rouen (res)	26	11	4	11	42	38	+4	37	
7	Avranches (res)	26	10	6	10	37	41	−4	36	
8	Gonfreville	26	9	8	9	33	41	−8	35	
9	Pacy Ménilles	26	9	6	11	27	35	−8	33	
10	Alençon	26	7	10	9	39	39	0	31	
11	Rouen	26	9	1	16	25	35	−10	28	
12	Dieppe	26	7	7	12	38	46	−8	28	
13	Bayeux	26	7	6	13	41	62	−21	27	
14	Dives-Cabourg (R)	26	2	6	18	24	72	−48	12	Relegation to Regional 1

Source: fff.fr
Rules for classification: 1) points; 2) head-to-head results; 3) head-to-head goal difference; 4) goal difference; 5) number of goals scored; 6) fair play points; 7) draw
(P) Promoted; (R) Relegated

=== Group K: Brittany ===
Pos	Team	Pld	W	D	L	GF	GA	GD	Pts	Promotion or relegation
1	Vannes (P)	26	16	9	1	55	17	+38	57	Promotion to National 2
2	Plabennec	26	12	10	4	49	29	+20	46	
3	Brest (res)	26	13	6	7	44	23	+21	45	
4	Guingamp (res)	26	12	6	8	36	27	+9	42	
5	Dinan-Léhon	26	11	8	7	35	30	+5	41	
6	Pontivy	26	10	8	8	32	31	+1	38	
7	Lannion	26	10	8	8	44	34	+10	38	
8	Montagnarde	26	10	4	12	29	34	−5	34	
9	TA Rennes	26	9	6	11	30	36	−6	33	
10	Saint-Colomban Locminé	26	7	11	8	31	33	−2	32	
11	Atlantique Vilaine	26	8	7	11	38	47	−9	31	
12	Guichen (R)	26	7	5	14	18	40	−22	26	Relegation to Regional 1
13	Concarneau (res) (R)	26	7	4	15	24	36	−12	25	Relegation to Regional 1
14	Ergué-Gabéric (R)	26	2	4	20	14	62	−48	10	Relegation to Regional 1

Source: fff.fr
Rules for classification: 1) points; 2) head-to-head results; 3) head-to-head goal difference; 4) goal difference; 5) number of goals scored; 6) fair play points; 7) draw
(P) Promoted; (R) Relegated

=== Group L: Île-de-France ===
Pos	Team	Pld	W	D	L	GF	GA	GD	Pts	Promotion or relegation
1	Bobigny (P)	26	14	9	3	45	21	+24	51	Promotion to National 2
2	Aubervilliers	26	13	6	7	38	32	+6	45	
3	Noisy-le-Sec	26	12	7	7	46	26	+20	43	
4	Versailles	26	12	7	7	35	31	+4	43	
5	Gobelins	26	13	1	12	37	31	+6	40	
6	Blanc-Mesnil	26	10	8	8	37	29	+8	38	
7	Ivry	26	10	6	10	37	35	+2	36	
8	Les Mureaux	26	8	10	8	21	21	0	34	
9	Les Ulis	26	8	9	9	36	43	−7	33	
10	Créteil (res)	26	7	11	8	38	33	+5	32	
11	Racing Colombes	26	8	5	13	30	41	−11	29	
12	Paris FC (res)	26	9	3	14	34	45	−11	28 (Note: Paris FC (res) were penalised for fielding a suspended player in the games against Gobelins on 18 November 2017 and Blanc-Mesnil on 25 November 2017. The scorelines were maintained, but Paris FC (res) were penalised one point for each game.)	
13	Saint-Ouen-l'Aumône (R)	26	5	10	11	26	41	−15	25	Relegation to Regional 1
14	Sénart-Moissy (R)	26	5	4	17	26	57	−31	19	Relegation to Regional 1

Source: fff.fr
Rules for classification: 1) points; 2) head-to-head results; 3) head-to-head goal difference; 4) goal difference; 5) number of goals scored; 6) fair play points; 7) draw
(P) Promoted; (R) Relegated

=== Group M: Auvergne-Rhône-Alpes ===
Pos	Team	Pld	W	D	L	GF	GA	GD	Pts	Promotion or relegation
1	Saint-Étienne (res) (P)	26	19	5	2	58	17	+41	62	Promotion to National 2
2	Bourgoin-Jallieu	26	17	8	1	37	12	+25	59	
3	Clermont (res)	26	15	6	5	44	23	+21	51	
4	Aurillac	26	13	5	8	38	34	+4	44	
5	Ain Sud	26	13	3	10	37	33	+4	42	
6	Chambéry	26	8	9	9	32	26	+6	33	
7	Vaulx-en-Velin	26	9	5	12	41	39	+2	32	
8	Thiers	26	9	5	12	33	42	−9	32	
9	Chamalières	26	8	5	13	25	32	−7	29	
10	Limonest	26	5	11	10	24	32	−8	26	
11	Ytrac	26	7	5	14	24	45	−21	26	
12	Montluçon	26	7	4	15	24	42	−18	25	
13	Bourg-en-Bresse (res) (R)	26	6	6	14	26	36	−10	23 (Note: Bourg-en-Bresse (res) were penalised for fielding a suspended player in the game against Ain Sud on 17 February 2018. The original scoreline was 1–0. The revised result was a technical win for Ain Sud, with a scoreline of 0–0, and a penalty point deduction for Bourg-en-Bresse (res).)	Relegation to Regional 1
14	Volvic (R)	26	5	5	16	21	51	−30	20	Relegation to Regional 1

Source: fff.fr
Rules for classification: 1) points; 2) head-to-head results; 3) head-to-head goal difference; 4) goal difference; 5) number of goals scored; 6) fair play points; 7) draw
(P) Promoted; (R) Relegated

== Season outcomes ==
Outcomes below are provisional and subject to ratification by the FFF.

=== Promotion ===
Bordeaux (res), Nantes (res), Blois, Endoume Marseille, Pontarlier, Haguenau, Nîmes (res), Feignies Aulnoye, Oissel, Vannes, Bobigny and Saint-Étienne (res) were promoted to 2018–19 Championnat National 2 as champions of their respective groups.

As of 19 June, all promotions had been verified by the FFF and DNCG

=== Champions ===
The title of Champion of Championnat National 3 is awarded to the team with the best record in games against the teams that finished in 2nd to 6th place in their group, with goal difference to separate ties.

Pos	Team	Pts	GD
1	Vannes	22	13
2	Endoume Marseille	22	9
3	Saint-Étienne (res)	21	
4	Nantes (res)	20	10
5	Oissel	20	6
6	Feignies Aulnoye	20	4
7	Bordeaux (res)	19	
8	Blois	16	
9	Nîmes (res)	14	3
10	Bobigny	14	1
11	Haguenau	13	
12	Pontarlier	10	

Vannes are Champions of 2017–18 Championnat National 3.

=== Relegation ===
Libourne, Cozes, Feytiat, Changé, Poiré-sur-Vie, (Note: relegated administratively.) Mulsanne-Teloché, Dreux, St Cyr-sur-Loire, Bastia-Borgo (res), Île-Rousse, Saint-Apollinaire, Saint-Vit, Quetigny, Clémenceau Besançon, Metz (res), Prix-lès-Mézières, Lunéville, Pagny-sur-Moselle, Erstein, Trémery, Castanet, Luzenac, Narbonne, Roye Noyon, Ailly, Wasquehal, Saint-Amand, USON Mondeville, Dives-Cabourg, Concarneau (res), Guichen, Ergué-Gabéric, Saint-Ouen-l'Aumône, Sénart-Moissy, Volvic and Bourg-en-Bresse (res) were relegated to the Division d'Honneur of their respective regional leagues.

=== Reprieves ===
- La Flèche were reprieved due to the administrative relegation of Poiré-sur-Vie.
- Alès were reprieved due to the administrative relegation from Championnat National 2 to the Regional division of Paulhan-Pézenas
- Paris FC (res) were reprieved due to the administrative relegation from Championnat National 2 to the Regional division of Viry-Châtillon.
- Bayeux were reprieved due to the administrative relegation of Mondeville.
- Châteauneuf-sur-Loire were reprieved due to the administrative relegation of Dreux.

== Top scorers ==
As of end of season.

Rank	Player	Club	Goals
1	(Ivory Coast) Michel Gaye	Avoine Chinon	26
2	(France) Cyril Giesi	Haguenau	22
3	(France) Gaetan Laura	Évreux	21
4	(France) Zakaria Abidi	Versailles	19
5	(France) Ottman Dadoune	Bourgoin-Jallieu and Louhans-Cuiseaux	18
5	(France) Mohamed Bentahar	Racing Besançon	18
7	(France) Jordan Popineau	Tours (res) and Concarneau (res)	17
7	(France) Mathieu Manset	SC Bastia	17
7	(France) Serge Simon	Aurillac	17
7	(France) Willy Duventru	Bayonne	17
7	(France) Franck Revuelta	Gueugnon	17
7	(France) Gaëtan Weissbeck	Haguenau	17
