= Amadou Alassane =

French football player and manager (born 1983)

Personal information
- Date of birth: 7 April 1983 (age 43)
- Place of birth: Le Havre, France
- Height: 1.92 m (6 ft 4 in)
- Position: Forward

Senior career*
Years	Team	Apps	(Gls)
2000–2006	AM Neiges		
2006–2009	Le Havre	72	(18)
2011–2012	Gonfreville		
2018	Tréfileries Neiges		
2018–2019	Bolbec AC		
2019	Gonfreville	2	(1)
2019	FC Dieppe	2	(1)

Managerial career
- 2014–2016: Tréfileries Neiges
- * Club domestic league appearances and goals as of 21:29, 13 July 2020 (UTC)

Amadou Alassane (born 7 April 1983) is a French professional footballer who plays as a forward.

== Career ==
Born in Le Havre, Alassane spent his whole professional career at Le Havre but did not break into the world of professional football until the age of 23. Before turning professional, he played as an amateur for AM Neiges in the lower leagues of French football.

Alassane began a one-week trial with Scottish side Celtic on 17 July 2009, with the view to signing on a permanent deal.

In July 2015, six years after retiring with a heart defect, Alassane went on trial with English National League side Kidderminster Harriers, appearing in their 2–0 victory over Romulus.

Early in 2019–20 season Alassana left Championnat National 3 club ESM Gonfreville to join league rivals FC Dieppe.

== Career statistics ==
Appearances and goals by club, season and competition
Club	Season	League			National Cup		League Cup		Total	
Club	Season	Division	Apps	Goals	Apps	Goals	Apps	Goals	Apps	Goals
Le Havre	2006–07	Ligue 2	14	1	0	0	0	0	14	1
Le Havre	2007–08	Ligue 2	26	7	3	1	1	0	30	8
Le Havre	2008–09	Ligue 1	32	10	1	0	3	0	36	10
Le Havre	2009–10	Ligue 2	0	0	0	0	0	0	0	0
Le Havre	Total		72	18	4	2	4	0	80	18
Gonfreville	2019–20	Championnat National 3	2	1	0	0	0	0	2	1
FC Dieppe	2019–20	Championnat National 3	2	1	0	0	0	0	2	1
Career total			76	20	4	2	4	0	84	20
