= Benjamin Police =

French footballer (born 1988)

Personal information
- Date of birth: 19 May 1988 (age 38)
- Place of birth: Rouen, France
- Height: 1.88 m (6 ft 2 in)
- Position: Defender

Team information
- Current team: Gonfreville

Youth career
- 2003–2007: Le Havre

Senior career*
Years	Team	Apps	(Gls)
2007–2011	Le Havre	7	(0)
2010–2011	Le Havre	17	(0)
2014–	Gonfreville	29	(0)
- * Club domestic league appearances and goals as of 14:43, 22 December 2017 (UTC)

Benjamin Police (born 19 May 1988) is a French professional footballer who plays for Gonfreville, as a defender. He appeared in Ligue 1 for Le Havre.
