= Association sportive d'Ifs =

Creating Association sportive d'Ifs
- Full name: Creating Association sportive d'Ifs
- Founded: 1966
- Ground: Stade Pierre-Mendès-France
- Chairman: Emmanuel Grandet-Menant
- Manager: Kévin Leroux
- League: Régional 2
Home colours	Away colours

Association sportive d'Ifs are a football club based in Ifs.

== History ==
The club was formed in 1966 by local municipal councillor and deputy mayor Marcel Travert.

The club competed in the local and regional leagues until 2007 when it was promoted to the Championnat National 2. Two seasons later the club was back in the regional leagues where it has since remained.

== Stadium ==
The club play their games at Stade Pierre-Mendès-France.

== Honours ==
- DH Basse-Normandie (1) 2006-07
- Regional 3 Normandie group B 2024-25

== Former players ==
- (France) Benjamin Morel
