= SU Dives-Cabourg =

French football club

SU Dives
- Full name: Sport Union Dives-Cabourg
- Founded: 1929; 97 years ago
- Ground: Stade André Heurtematte, Dives-sur-Mer
- Chairman: Laurent Moinaux
- Manager: Philippe Clément
- League: National 3 Group F
- 2022–23: National 3 Group J, 10th
Home colours

Sport Union Dives-Cabourg is a French association football club. They were founded in 1929 as Sport Union Divaise. They are based in the town of Dives-sur-Mer and their home stadium is the Stade André Heurtematte.

In May 2016 they merged with neighbours AS Cabourg to form the current club.

From 2016 until 2018, they played in the Championnat National 3, having won a legal battle to get their place for the 2016–17 season after the season had started. They were relegated in 2018 to the Régional 1 of the Normandy league. In 2020 they were promoted again to National 3.

== Honours ==
DH Basse-Normandie (2) 2001-02, 2015-16
