= USF Fécamp =

Football club based in Fécamp, France

Fécamp
- Full name: Union Sportive Football de Fécamp
- Founded: 1903
- Stadium: Stade René-Gayant
- Capacity: 1,500
- President: Sylvain Guerin
- League: Régional 2 Normandie
- 2019–20: Régional 2 Normandie, 6th
- Website: http://www.us-football-fecamp.com/

Union Sportive Football de Fécamp is a football club based in Fécamp, France. Founded in 1903, it competes in the Régional 2, the seventh tier of the French football pyramid, as of the 2021–22 season. The team plays its home games at the Stade René-Gayant, and the club's colours are red and black.

The club has a women's team that played in the Division 1 Féminine from 1979 to 1982.

== History ==
Union Sportive Fécampoise was founded in May 1903. In 1935, the club absorbed Sporting Club de Fécamp.

From 1985 to 1997, Fécamp played in the third tier of French football, initially the Division 3 from 1985 to 1993 and subsequently the Championnat National 1 from 1993 to 1997. In 2002, the club was administratively relegated from the Championnat de France Amateur 2 to the Division d'Honneur.

The furthest Fécamp has advanced in the Coupe de France is the round of 32, which it has done on four occasions, and most recently in the 1996–97 season.

== Honours ==
USF Fécamp honours
Honour	No.	Years
Coupe de Normandie	5	1982–83, 1986–87, 1989–90, 1991–92, 1992–93
Division d'Honneur Normandie	2	1981–82, 1987–88
Division Régionale Normandie	2	1986–87, 1994–95
Division 4 Group B	1	1983–84
Promotion d'Honneur Normandie	1	1984–85
Promotion d'Honneur A	1	2010–11
Regional 3 Normandie group A	1	2023-24
