= FC Dieppe =

French football club

- Full name: Football Club Dieppois
- Nickname: Les Harengs
- Short name: FC Dieppe
- Founded: 18 November 1896; 129 years ago
- Stadium: Stade Jean Dasnias
- Capacity: 3,100
- Club president: Patrick Coquelet
- Manager: Djilalli Bekkar
- League: Championnat National 1 (Note: Championnat National 2 was renamed to Championnat National 1 following the 2025–26 season.)
- 2025–26: National 3 Group E, 1st of 14 (Promoted)
colours	colours

FC Dieppe, officially Football Club Dieppois, is a team in the French football club based in Dieppe (Seine-Maritime). It was founded in 1896. They play at the Stade Jean Dasniaa, which has a capacity of 3,100. The colours of club are white and blue.

The club plays in the Championnat National 1, the fourth tier of French football, after winning promotion in the 2024–25 season.

== Current squad ==
As of 1 April 2019

Note: Flags indicate national team as defined under FIFA eligibility rules; some limited exceptions apply. Players may hold more than one non-FIFA nationality.

No.	Pos.	Nation	Player
—	GK	FRA	Dylan Bayer
—	GK	FRA	Frédéric Burel
—	GK	FRA	Nathan Gremont
—	DF	FRA	Jonathan Bideau
—	DF	FRA	Jimmy Garnier
—	DF	FRA	Alban Lefebvre
—	DF	FRA	Théo Letombe
—	DF	FRA	Jonathan Mortoire
—	DF	FRA	Valentin Ouine
—	DF	FRA	Cédric Rimbert
—	DF	FRA	Robin Trehet
—	MF	FRA	Julien Auffray
—	MF	FRA	Logan Biteau

No.	Pos.	Nation	Player
—	MF	FRA	Korentin Dumont
—	MF	FRA	John Friboulet
—	MF	FRA	Corentin Hébert
—	MF	FRA	Florian Levasseur
—	MF	CMR	Mathias Mbabi
—	MF	FRA	Damien Plisson
—	MF	FRA	Romain Thomas
—	FW	FRA	Jules Etienne
—	FW	FRA	Oumar Fall
—	FW	FRA	Hugo Gisbert
—	FW	FRA	Tony Joly
—	FW	FRA	Jason Luanda
—	FW	FRA	Florian Sohey

== Honours ==
- Haute-Normandie DH championship: 1952, 1956, 1961, 1973, 1987, 1991, 1996
- Championnat de France Amateur 2: 2013 (Group A)

== Statistics ==
Season by season

Season	League	Position	Pts	W	D	L	GF	GA	GD	French Cup
2019-2020	National 3	-	-	-	-	-	-	-	-	1/32
2018-2019	National 3	6	37	11	4	11	35	36	-1	1/32
2017-2018	National 3	12	28	7	7	12	38	46	-8	R5
2016-2017	CFA	15	28	6	10	14	21	47	-26	R4
2015-2016	CFA	11	67	9	10	11	31	24	+7	R5
2014-2015	CFA	5	71	11	8	11	33	28	+5	R5
2013-2014	CFA	12	64	10	6	12	30	32	-2	-
2012-2013	CFA 2	1	91	20	5	1	67	18	+49	1/32
2011-2012	CFA 2	6	73	10	13	7	42	32	+10	R7
2010-2011	CFA 2	6	71	10	11	9	40	28	+12	R5
2009-2010	CFA 2	6	74	12	8	10	43	36	+7	R5
2008-2009	CFA 2	7	79	14	5	13	45	42	+3	R5
2007-2008	CFA 2	9	70	11	7	12	32	36	-4	R8
2006-2007	CFA	17	62	6	10	18	27	50	-23	-
2005-2006	CFA	11	75	10	11	13	28	41	-13	-
2004-2005	CFA	7	84	13	11	10	49	42	+7	R7
2003-2004	CFA	3	90	14	14	6	56	41	+15	-
2002-2003	CFA	6	85	14	9	11	54	47	+7	R8
2001-2002	CFA	6	83	14	7	13	43	42	+1	R7
2000-2001	CFA	12	77	10	13	11	47	57	-10	1/32

Champion
Vice-champion
Promotion
Relegation
