= ESM Gonfreville =

French football club

Gonfreville
- Full name: Entente Sportive Municipale de Gonfreville-l'Orcher
- Founded: 1955
- Ground: Stade Maurice Baquet, Gonfreville-l'Orcher
- Chairman: Cédric Le Merrer
- Manager: Rachid Hamzaoui
- League: Régional 1 Normandy
- 2021–22: National 3 Group J, 11th (relegated)
Home colours

Entente Sportive Municipale de Gonfreville-l'Orcher is a French association football team founded in 1955. They are based in Gonfreville-l'Orcher, Seine-Maritime. Their home stadium is the Stade Maurice Baquet in the town. As of the 2023–24 season, they play in Régional 1, the sixth tier of French football, after winning promotion in 2022, but being relegated again the following season.

Gonfreville reached the 8th round of the 1991–92 Coupe de France.

== Honours ==
- DH Normandie (2) 2013-14, 2016-17
- Normandie Group A (1) 2020-21
