= 2025–26 Coupe de France preliminary rounds, Normandy =

The 2025–26 Coupe de France preliminary rounds, Normandy was the qualifying competition to decide which teams from the leagues of the Normandy region of France took part in the main competition from the seventh round.

A total of nine teams qualified from the Normandy preliminary rounds, as in the previous season.

In 2024–25, Championnat National 3 side SU Dives-Cabourg progressed furthest in the main competition from the regional preliminary rounds, reaching the round of 16 where they lost to Championnat National 2 side AS Cannes.

== Draws and fixtures ==
The draw for the first round of the competition was published on 21 July 2025. 308 teams entered the competition at this stage. The second round draw took place on 27 August 2025, and saw the entry of the clubs from the second level of regional football.

The third round draw was published on 3 September 2025, with teams from Régional 1 and Championnat National 3 entering at this stage. The fourth round draw, which saw the teams from Championnat National 2 enter, was published on 17 September 2025. The fifth round draw was published on 1 October 2025, and saw the entry of the teams from Championnat National. The sixth round draw was made on 15 October 2025.

=== First round ===
These matches were played on 23 and 24 August 2025, with one replayed on 31 August 2025.

First Round Results: Normandy
Tie no	Home team (Tier)	Score	Away team (Tier)
1.	FC Terre et Mer (9)	1–1 (5–3 p)	US Ducey-Isigny (8)
2.	AS Montebourg (11)	0–4	AS Sainte-Marie-du-Mont (10)
3.	Entente Le Lorey-Hauteville-Feugères (11)	1–1 (4–2 p)	US Saint-Martin Saint-Jean-de-la Haize (9)
4.	AS Val de Sienne (9)	0–2	US Saint-Quentin-sur-le-Homme (8)
5.	ES Marigny Lozon Mesnil Vogot (12)	0–2	AS Jullouville-Sartilly (8)
6.	US Vanne Sienne et Mer (10)	0–4	US Patriote Terregatte Beuvron (9)
7.	ES Gouville-sur-Mer (10)	1–3	AJ Saint-Hilaire-Petitville (9)
8.	US Vesly-Laulne (11)	2–6	AS Thèreval (9)
9.	FC du Thar (10)	1–1 (2–4 p)	FC 3 Rivières (8)
10.	SCU Douve Divette (9)	1–2	ASS Urville-Nacqueville (10)
11.	US La Glacerie (10)	0–0 (4–2 p)	US Ouest Cotentin (9)
12.	La Bréhalaise FC (9)	5–1	AS Bérigny-Cerisy (8)
13.	ES Munevillaise (10)	2–0	ASJ Blainville-Saint-Malo (11)
14.	FC de l'Elle (10)	0–2	Condé Sports (8)
15.	FC Brix Sottevast Saint-Joseph (10)	2–1	ES des Marais (11)
16.	US Saint-Jacques-de-Néhou (11)	1–1 (10–9 p)	SM Haytillon (10)
17.	AS Pointe Cotentin (9)	5–0	AS Gréville-Hague (10)
18.	ES Quettetot-Rauville (11)	0–13	FC Val de Saire (8)
19.	Octeville Hague Sports (11)	1–11	ES de l'Ay (11)
20.	AS Querqueville (10)	2–3	ES Plain (9)
21.	ES Tirepied (11)	0–12	US Percy (8)
22.	US Semilly Saint-André (11)	3–2	USCO Sourdeval (10)
23.	US Roncey Cerisy (11)	1–2	USM Donville (10)
24.	US Pontorson (10)	0–3	CS Villedieu (8)
25.	US Sainte-Croix Saint-Lô (8)	4–0	AS Brécey (9)
26.	UC Bricquebec (9)	2–3	US Vasteville-Acqueville (10)
27.	AS Coudeville Hudimesnil (12)	0–5	FC Le Val Saint-Père (9)
28.	Périers SF (11)	0–1	CA Pontois (9)
29.	PL Octeville (10)	0–2	AS Valognes (8)
30.	AS Saint-Ovin (12)	0–3	AS Cerencaise (9)
31.	FC Écouché (10)	6–0	FC Pays Bellêmois (11)
32.	FC Baie de l'Orne (10)	3–1	ES Cormelles (9)
33.	US Pétruvienne (10)	1–7	USM Blainvillaise (9)
34.	ES Sannerville-Touffréville (10)	1–0	FC Caen Sud Ouest (10)
35.	NGS Ver-sur-Mer (11)	2–3	Bretteville-sur-Odon Football (9)
36.	ES Bonnebosq (11)	0–3 (Note: Tie won by means of forfeit.)	AS Saint-Désir (9)
37.	FC Saint-Germain-Langot (11)	0–2	ASL Chemin Vert (8)
38.	Croissanville FC (11)	2–2 (5–3 p)	AS Saint-Cyr-Fervaques (11)
39.	Crouay FC (12)	0–3	ES Portaise (10)
40.	FC Rocquancourt (11)	2–2 (4–5 p)	Hastings FC Rots Cheux Saint-Manvieu Norrey (9)
41.	AS Le Merlerault Nonant-le-Pin (11)	4–0	FC Mortrée (11)
42.	Saint-Paul Montligeonnaise (12)	1–1 (1–4 p)	Olympique Alençonnais (11)
43.	AS Boucé (10)	1–0	AC Bazoches-sur-Hoëne (11)
44.	US Mêloise (10)	4–3	Sées FC (11)
45.	Soligny-Aspres-Moulins Football (10)	3–3 (4–5 p)	Amicale Chailloué (11)
46.	Stade Vernolien (8)	3–0	FC Pays Aiglon (8)
47.	AS Berd'huis Foot (9)	4–2	ES Écouves (10)
48.	AS Valburgeoise (11)	1–3	CS Pays de Longny (11)
49.	FC Argentan (8)	3–0	Hauts du Perche FC (8)
50.	AS Courteille Alençon (10)	3–2 (Note: AS Courteille Alençon penalised, La Vedette du Boisthorel qualifed.)	La Vedette du Boisthorel (11)
51.	SS Domfrontaise (8)	2–0	AM La Ferrière-aux-Etangs (9)
52.	AS Sarceaux Espoir (10)	2–0	FC Detente Chambois-Fel (10)
53.	US Mortagnaise (9)	7–1	AS Gacé (10)
54.	SL Petruvien (10)	2–4	US Flerienne (10)
55.	FC Landais (10)	0–1	Avenir Messei (8)
56.	US Ménil-de-Briouze (11)	0–0 (9–8 p)	CO Ceaucé (9)
57.	OC Briouze (8)	2–0	AS Passais-Saint-Fraimbault (9)
58.	JS Tinchebray (9)	1–0	AS La Selle-la-Forge (8)
59.	Sai CO (12)	1–0	FC Carrouges (10)
60.	US Athis (9)	3–2	US Andaine (8)
61.	Grainville-sur-Odon FC (10)	3–2	USI La Graverie (10)
62.	FC Roumois Nord (11)	0–5	FC Ézy-sur-Eure (11)
63.	AS Courcelles (8)	0–1	ES Vallée de l'Oison (9)
64.	FCI Bel Air (10)	0–0 (3–4 p)	US Gasny (8)
65.	SC Bernay (11)	2–0	ES Damville (11)
66.	SC Thiberville (10)	3–4	Charleval FC (10)
67.	ES Vexin Ouest (12)	5–2	Fusion Charentonne Saint-Aubin (11)
68.	Castelet FC (10)	0–5	US Pont-l'Évêque (8)
69.	AS Côte de Nacre (12)	0–2	CL Colombellois (10)
70.	AJS Colleville-Ouistreham (8)	4–0	FC Troarn (8)
71.	AS La Hoguette (12)	0–15	Bourguébus-Soliers FC (8)
72.	Football Mixte Condé-en-Normandie (10)	1–3	Réveil Saint-Germain Courseulles-sur-Mer (8)
73.	SC Saint-Julien-le-Faucon (11)	1–6	Cresserons-Hermanville-Lion Terre et Mer (9)
74.	Fontenay-le-Pesnel FC (11)	1–3	JS Audrieu (10)
75.	FC Boulon Laurentais Laize-Clinchamps (10)	1–4	AS Mathieu (10)
76.	FC Vital Démouville Cuverville (10)	1–1 (5–6 p)	FC Moyaux (11)
77.	AS Cahagnes (9)	4–3	US Trévières (10)
78.	JS Bocage (11)	2–2 (4–5 p)	AS Balleroy (12)
79.	IS Caumontaise (11)	1–9	ES Thury-Harcourt (9)
80.	AF Basly (10)	4–3	ESI Vallée de l'Orne (10)
81.	ES Tronquay (10)	1–1 (3–4 p) (Note: Inter Odon FC penalised, ES Tronquay qualified.)	Inter Odon FC (9)
82.	Cingal FC (10)	0–1	AS Giberville (8)
83.	ASL Ajon (10)	0–7	USI Bessin Nord (9)
84.	AS Saint-Philbert-des-Champs (11)	4–3	FC Touques Côte Fleurie (11)
85.	FC Mouen (10)	3–3 (5–4 p)	US Aunay-sur-Odon (9)
86.	US Guérinière (12)	0–4	AS Saint-Vigor-le-Grand (9)
87.	UA Saint-Sever (10)	0–6	Lystrienne Sportive (9)
88.	CS Orbecquois-Vespèrois (9)	2–2 (3–5 p)	AS Potigny-Villers-Canivet-Ussy (9)
89.	ES Courtonnaise (11)	1–2	ES Livarotaise (9)
90.	FC Le-Breuil-en-Auge (11)	0–2	Dozulé FC (10)
91.	RC Malherbe Surville (12)	1–2	AS Andréseinne (8)
92.	ASL Ramponneau (9)	2–0	ES Janval (9)
93.	AS Sassetot-Thérouldeville (10)	0–8	AS Fauvillaise (8)
94.	Stade Valeriquais (10)	0–1	AS Sainte-Adresse But (9)
95.	FC Petit Caux (9)	1–0	CS Gravenchon (8)
96.	Rogerville FC (11)	1–5	SS Gournay (9)
97.	FA Caux-Marine (11)	1–3	CA Longuevillais (10)
98.	US Sennevillaise (none)	1–3	US Épouville (9)
99.	AS Vallée du Dun (12)	0–3	FC Barentinois (8)
100.	US Saint-Thomas (10)	0–4	Caux FC (8)
101.	US des Vallées (10)	2–7	SC Frileuse (8)
102.	AS Ourville (8)	1–0	AS Montivilliers (8)
103.	Saint-Romain AC (9)	1–1 (5–4 p)	FC Tôtes (9)
104.	US Doudeville (9)	1–1 (3–2 p)	FC Gruchet-le-Valasse (10)
105.	CS Beaumont-le-Roger (9)	5–1	AC Beuzeville (10)
106.	FC Saint-Maclou-Boulleville (11)	1–5	CS Ivry-la-Bataille (11)
107.	RC Léry (10)	0–0 (2–3 p)	FA Roumois (9)
108.	AS Hondouville (10)	0–1	La Croix Vallée d'Eure (9)
109.	CS Bonneville (9)	2–2 (4–2 p)	FC Pays du Neubourg (8)
110.	FC Brionne (11)	1–5	FC Seine-Eure (8)
111.	US Barroise (10)	0–0 (0–3 p)	US Louviers (10)
112.	FC Avrais Nonancourt (11)	2–3	FC Prey (10)
113.	FC Igoville (11)	0–7	FC Garennes-Bueil-La Couture-Breuilpont (8)
114.	US Étrépagny (11)	1–1 (11–12 p)	Romilly-Pont-Saint-Pierre FC (8)
115.	US Saint-Germain-la-Campagne (10)	0–3	US Conches (8)
116.	CA Pont-Audemer (9)	3–0	AS Routot (10)
117.	US Rugles-Lyre (9)	6–1	US Cormeilles-Lieurey (10)
118.	CS Andelys (10)	0–1	FC Val de Risle (9)
119.	CF Douains (11)	2–1	AS Criquebeuf Football (11)
120.	AS Vesly (10)	– (Note: Match abandonded in stoppage time with the scoreline 2–1 after a large brawl between supporters. Both teams were subsequently disqualified from the competition.)	Saint-Aubin FC (8)
121.	FC Bonsecours Saint Léger (10)	1–2	Rouen Sapins FC Grand-Mare (8)
122.	US Auffay (9)	0–0 (5–4 p)	JS Saint-Nicolas-d'Aliermont-Béthune (8)
123.	AS SYNQ Villages (10)	1–0	AS Quevilly/CHU Rouen (12)
124.	US Grèges (10)	1–3	US Londinières (10)
125.	Entente Motteville/Croix-Mare (10)	3–7	FC Le Trait-Duclair (9)
126.	Entente Vienne et Saâne (8)	0–2	Stade Grand-Quevilly (8)
127.	AS Mesnières (10)	0–1	Amicale Houlmoise Bondevillaise FC (9)
128.	FC Anneville-Manéhouville-Crosville (none)	0–6	AS Canton d'Argueil (9)
129.	Neuville AC (10)	0–1	Eu FC (8)
130.	Yerville FC (10)	2–2 (4–2 p)	Caudebec-Saint-Pierre FC (8)
131.	FC Tourville-La-Rivière (8)	6–2	AS Buchy (8)
132.	ES Aumaloise (10)	1–1 (4–3 p)	AC Bray Est (9)
133.	Entente Saint-Pierraise (10)	3–2	GCO Bihorel (10)
134.	Saint-Maurice FC (9)	3–0	US Forêt de Roumare (10)
135.	FC de la Varenne (10)	2–1	ES Montigny La Vaupalière (10)
136.	RC Port du Havre (10)	5–0 (Note: RC Port du Havre penalised, US Bacqueville-Pierreville qualified.)	US Bacqueville-Pierreville (9)
137.	FC Boos (11)	4–1	FC Biville-la-Baignarde (10)
138.	FC Nord Ouest (10)	1–1 (4–3 p)	Rouen AC (10)
139.	FC Fréville-Bouville SIVOM (12)	3–0	FC Louvetot (none)
140.	US Saint-Martin-Osmonville (10)	1–5	Cany FC (8)
141.	Boucle de Seine (10)	0–1	Plateau de Quincampoix FC (8)
142.	US Presqu'ile (10)	0–4	AS Saint-Pierre-de-Varengeville (9)
143.	Isneauville FC (12)	1–4	SC Petit-Couronne (10)
144.	CO Cléon (9)	0–6	Olympique Darnétal (8)
145.	ES Tourville (8)	0–6	FC Offranville (8)
146.	GS Saint-Aubin Saint-Vigor (10)	1–2	ESI Saint-Antoine (10)
147.	US Godervillais (12)	1–3	US des Falaises (10)
148.	AS Ouvillaise (10)	1–1 (2–4 p)	US Héricourt-en-Caux (9)
149.	Gainneville AC (10)	2–2 (3–4 p)	Le Havre FC 2012 (9)
150.	US Allouville Trouville (11)	0–0 (3–5 p)	FC Saint-Sauveur-d'Émalleville (9)
151.	US Crielloise (9)	2–3	ES Plateau-Foucarmont-Réalcamp (8)
152.	US Normande 76 (9)	1–0	AS Tréport (9)
153.	AS Gournay-en-Bray (9)	1–3	Canteleu FC (8)
154.	FC Plateau Nord (11)	0–1 (Note: The original match on 24 August 2025 was ordered to be replayed after a refereeing error. The replayed game took place on 31 August 2025.)	ES Angerville/Baux-Sainte-Croix/Plessis-Grohan/Ventes (11)

=== Second round ===
These matches were played on 30 and 31 August 2025, with one delayed until 7 September 2025 awaiting the outcome of the previous round.

Second Round Results: Normandy
Tie no	Home team (Tier)	Score	Away team (Tier)
1.	AS Jullouville-Sartilly (8)	0–2	Agneaux FC (7)
2.	USM Donville (10)	4–2	US La Glacerie (10)
3.	US Saint-Quentin-sur-le-Homme (8)	1–2	US Côte des Iles (7)
4.	ASS Urville-Nacqueville (10)	1–2	ES Saint-Sauveur-La Ronde-Haye (8)
5.	FC Val de Saire (8)	1–3	AS Tourlaville (7)
6.	US Patriote Terregatte Beuvron (9)	1–0	Saint-Hilaire-Virey-Landelles (8)
7.	FC 3 Rivières (8)	0–2	FC Équeurdreville-Hainneville (7)
8.	AJ Saint-Hilaire-Petitville (9)	1–0	FC Terre et Mer (9)
9.	ES de l'Ay (11)	1–2	ES Munevillaise (10)
10.	FC Le Val Saint-Père (9)	0–1	La Bréhalaise FC (9)
11.	AS Sainte-Marie-du-Mont (10)	3–1	US Saint-Jacques-de-Néhou (11)
12.	Tessy-Moyon Sports (7)	1–3	ES Pointe Hague (7)
13.	US Vasteville-Acqueville (10)	0–2	AS Cerencaise (9)
14.	FC Agon-Coutainville (8)	0–2	CS Villedieu (8)
15.	Condé Sports (8)	1–2	FC des Etangs (7)
16.	AS Valognes (8)	1–1 (5–6 p)	US Sainte-Croix Saint-Lô (8)
17.	AS Thèreval (9)	0–7	ES Coutances (7)
18.	FC Moyaux (11)	1–2	JS Douvres (7)
19.	Entente Le Lorey-Hauteville-Feugères (11)	0–0 (3–1 p)	US Semilly Saint-André (11)
20.	Cresserons-Hermanville-Lion Terre et Mer (9)	3–0	Hastings FC Rots Cheux Saint-Manvieu Norrey (9)
21.	ES Sannerville-Touffréville (10)	4–0	Grainville-sur-Odon FC (10)
22.	FC Brix Sottevast Saint-Joseph (10)	0–8	CS Carentan (7)
23.	ES Livarotaise (9)	1–4	AJS Colleville-Ouistreham (8)
24.	AS Mathieu (10)	0–0 (2–4 p)	FC Baie de l'Orne (10)
25.	ES Portaise (10)	2–4	AS Saint-Philbert-des-Champs (11)
26.	AS Le Merlerault Nonant-le-Pin (11)	1–2	JS Tinchebray (9)
27.	ES Plain (9)	0–2	US Percy (8)
28.	CA Pontois (9)	2–3	AS Pointe Cotentin (9)
29.	US Athis (9)	0–2	US Mortagnaise (9)
30.	Sai CO (12)	1–1 (2–3 p)	FC Écouché (10)
31.	Avenir Messei (8)	4–2	OC Briouze (8)
32.	US Flerienne (10)	1–2	Amicale Chailloué (11)
33.	Olympique Alençonnais (11)	0–8	Jeunesse Fertoise Bagnoles (7)
34.	La Vedette du Boisthorel (11)	1–1 (4–3 p)	Leopards Saint-Georges (8)
35.	AS Sarceaux Espoir (10)	0–3	Espérance Condé-sur-Sarthe (7)
36.	US Mêloise (10)	1–2	FC Argentan (8)
37.	AS Berd'huis Foot (9)	5–0	AS Boucé (10)
38.	US Ménil-de-Briouze (11)	0–9	SS Domfrontaise (8)
39.	JS Audrieu (10)	3–1	ES Thury-Harcourt (9)
40.	Dozulé FC (10)	0–2	ES Carpiquet (8)
41.	AS Saint-Vigor-le-Grand (9)	0–1	AS Verson (8)
42.	CL Colombellois (10)	1–6	ASL Chemin Vert (8)
43.	AF Basly (10)	2–4	AS Ifs (7)
44.	Croissanville FC (11)	1–4	US Pont-l'Évêque (8)
45.	Réveil Saint-Germain Courseulles-sur-Mer (8)	3–0	CS Honfleur (7)
46.	AS Saint-Désir (9)	4–1	ESFC Falaise (7)
47.	Lystrienne Sportive (9)	2–1	AS Cahagnes (9)
48.	AS Potigny-Villers-Canivet-Ussy (9)	2–0	US Villers-Bocage (7)
49.	AS Giberville (8)	2–0	Bretteville-sur-Odon Football (9)
50.	USM Blainvillaise (9)	4–1	FC Thaon-Bretteville-Le Fresne (8)
51.	ES Tronquay (10)	1–5	Muance FC (7)
52.	AS Balleroy (12)	3–9	USI Bessin Nord (9)
53.	FC Mouen (10)	0–2	Bourguébus-Soliers FC (8)
54.	SC Bernay (11)	0–3	US Gasny (8)
55.	FC Prey (10)	0–0 (3–5 p)	US Rugles-Lyre (9)
56.	FC Ézy-sur-Eure (11)	2–2 (4–2 p)	FC Garennes-Bueil-La Couture-Breuilpont (8)
57.	CS Ivry-la-Bataille (11)	1–6	FC Gisors Vexin Normand (7)
58.	CA Pont-Audemer (9)	3–2	FC Serquigny-Nassandres (7)
59.	La Croix Vallée d'Eure (9)	1–1 (4–2 p)	CS Bonneville (9)
60.	ES Normanville (8)	0–3	FC Val de Reuil (7)
61.	FA Roumois (9)	3–0	CS Beaumont-le-Roger (9)
62.	AS Sainte-Adresse But (9)	0–0 (3–5 p)	FC Saint-Étienne-du-Rouvray (8)
63.	Mont-Saint-Aignan FC (8)	0–5	FC Neufchâtel (7)
64.	Eu FC (8)	1–3	AL Deville-Maromme (7)
65.	Rouen Sapins FC Grand-Mare (8)	3–4	SC Frileuse (8)
66.	US Épouville (9)	2–0	US Londinières (10)
67.	Charleval FC (10)	6–0	CF Douains (11)
68.	Plateau de Quincampoix FC (8)	1–2	ES Plateau-Foucarmont-Réalcamp (8)
69.	ES Vexin Ouest (12)	0–2	US Louviers (10)
70.	FC Seine-Eure (8)	1–5	Stade Porte Normande Vernon (7)
71.	AS Andréseinne (8)	3–0	Saint-Sébastien Foot (7)
72.	FC Val de Risle (9)	1–1 (4–3 p)	FC Illiers-l'Évêque (7)
73.	ES Vallée de l'Oison (9)	0–2	Stade Vernolien (8)
74.	US Conches (8)	2–2 (3–5 p)	FAC Alizay (7)
75.	FC Nord Ouest (10)	1–1 (5–3 p)	AS Ourville (8)
76.	US des Falaises (10)	0–3	AS Madrillet Château Blanc (7)
77.	CA Longuevillais (10)	0–5	US Bolbec (7)
78.	Entente Saint-Pierraise (10)	1–2	ASL Ramponneau (9)
79.	FC Offranville (8)	0–2	FUSC Bois-Guillaume (7)
80.	Saint-Romain AC (9)	0–5 (Note: CSSM Le Havre penalised, Saint-Romain AC qualified.)	CSSM Le Havre (7)
81.	Caux FC (8)	0–1	Stade Grand-Quevilly (8)
82.	FC Petit Caux (9)	1–1 (4–1 p)	FC Tourville-La-Rivière (8)
83.	FC Le Trait-Duclair (9)	3–1	ES Mont-Gaillard (8)
84.	AS Fauvillaise (8)	1–1 (4–3 p)	Romilly-Pont-Saint-Pierre FC (8)
85.	Le Havre FC 2012 (9)	2–4	FC Saint-Julien Petit Quevilly (7)
86.	Yerville FC (10)	1–4	Olympique Havrais Tréfileries-Neiges (8)
87.	AS Canton d'Argueil (9)	4–0	ES Aumaloise (10)
88.	SC Petit-Couronne (10)	5–1	AS SYNQ Villages (10)
89.	FC de la Varenne (10)	0–5	Cany FC (8)
90.	SC Octevillais (7)	6–2	Canteleu FC (8)
91.	FC Boos (11)	2–3	US Normande 76 (9)
92.	AS Saint-Pierre-de-Varengeville (9)	0–4	Stade Sottevillais CC (7)
93.	US Héricourt-en-Caux (9)	2–3	FC Barentinois (8)
94.	US Auffay (9)	2–2 (4–3 p)	Saint-Maurice FC (9)
95.	ESI Saint-Antoine (10)	2–2 (4–2 p)	US Mesnil-Esnard/Franqueville (8)
96.	FC Fréville-Bouville SIVOM (12)	1–5	Olympique Pavillais (7)
97.	Amicale Houlmoise Bondevillaise FC (9)	1–1 (5–4 p)	FC Saint-Sauveur-d'Émalleville (9)
98.	US Doudeville (9)	0–4	USF Fécamp (7)
99.	US Bacqueville-Pierreville (9)	0–4	US Lillebonne (7)
100.	Olympique Darnétal (8)	1–2	Olympia'caux FC (7)
101.	CS Pays de Longny (11)	1–4	ES Angerville/Baux-Sainte-Croix/Plessis-Grohan/Ventes (11)
102.	SS Gournay (9)	–	bye (first round game 120)

=== Third round ===
These matches were played on 13 and 14 September 2025.

Third Round Results: Normandy
Tie no	Home team (Tier)	Score	Away team (Tier)
1.	Entente Le Lorey-Hauteville-Feugères (11)	0–4	FC Flers (6)
2.	ES Saint-Sauveur-La Ronde-Haye (8)	1–3	La Bréhalaise FC (9)
3.	AS Pointe Cotentin (9)	0–11	US Alençon (5)
4.	FC des Etangs (7)	0–2	AS Cherbourg Football (6)
5.	JS Audrieu (10)	0–5	Jeunesse Fertoise Bagnoles (7)
6.	Lystrienne Sportive (9)	0–0 (4–5 p)	CS Carentan (7)
7.	Réveil Saint-Germain Courseulles-sur-Mer (8)	1–2	ASPTT Caen (6)
8.	ES Pointe Hague (7)	0–3	ES Coutances (7)
9.	ES Munevillaise (10)	1–3	CS Villedieu (8)
10.	AS Verson (8)	1–1 (5–3 p)	US Côte des Iles (7)
11.	Cresserons-Hermanville-Lion Terre et Mer (9)	0–3	Maladrerie OS (6)
12.	ES Carpiquet (8)	7–1	US Patriote Terregatte Beuvron (9)
13.	US Sainte-Croix Saint-Lô (8)	1–3	Agneaux FC (7)
14.	JS Tinchebray (9)	0–3	FC Saint-Lô Manche (6)
15.	SS Domfrontaise (8)	2–1	US Percy (8)
16.	USI Bessin Nord (9)	0–2	FC Équeurdreville-Hainneville (7)
17.	AS Cerencaise (9)	1–6	Bayeux FC (6)
18.	JS Douvres (7)	0–1	ASL Chemin Vert (8)
19.	USM Donville (10)	0–10	AS Tourlaville (7)
20.	Avenir Messei (8)	3–4	AJ Saint-Hilaire-Petitville (9)
21.	AS Sainte-Marie-du-Mont (10)	0–13	AF Virois (5)
22.	FC Ézy-sur-Eure (11)	1–1 (4–1 p)	AS Saint-Désir (9)
23.	Olympique Havrais Tréfileries-Neiges (8)	0–1	CA Lisieux Pays d'Auge (6)
24.	ES Sannerville-Touffréville (10)	0–7	Pacy Ménilles RC (6)
25.	USC Mézidon (6)	0–2 (Note: SC Hérouvillais penalised for fielding too many transferred players, USC Mézidon qualified.)	SC Hérouvillais (6)
26.	ES Angerville/Baux-Sainte-Croix/Plessis-Grohan/Ventes (11)	0–0 (4–2 p)	La Vedette du Boisthorel (11)
27.	Stade Vernolien (8)	4–3	FC Argentan (8)
28.	AS Potigny-Villers-Canivet-Ussy (9)	1–1 (4–3 p)	AS Ifs (7)
29.	US Mortagnaise (9)	6–0	AS Berd'huis Foot (9)
30.	US Gasny (8)	4–0	FA Roumois (9)
31.	FC Baie de l'Orne (10)	2–2 (3–5 p)	FC Val de Risle (9)
32.	FAC Alizay (7)	1–0	FC Val de Reuil (7)
33.	La Croix Vallée d'Eure (9)	1–1 (3–4 p)	USM Blainvillaise (9)
34.	Amicale Chailloué (11)	0–3	AJS Colleville-Ouistreham (8)
35.	AS Saint-Philbert-des-Champs (11)	1–3	AS Andréseinne (8)
36.	Espérance Condé-sur-Sarthe (7)	1–2	USON Mondeville (6)
37.	Bourguébus-Soliers FC (8)	0–3	SU Dives-Cabourg (5)
38.	US Pont-l'Évêque (8)	1–8	AS Trouville-Deauville (5)
39.	Stade Porte Normande Vernon (7)	3–1	AS Giberville (8)
40.	US Rugles-Lyre (9)	2–2 (2–4 p)	CA Pont-Audemer (9)
41.	Muance FC (7)	0–2	AG Caennaise (6)
42.	FC Écouché (10)	1–4	US Louviers (10)
43.	FC Petit Caux (9)	0–1	ESM Gonfreville (6)
44.	FC Barentinois (8)	1–2	AL Deville-Maromme (7)
45.	Stade Sottevillais CC (7)	0–1	US Luneraysienne (6)
46.	US Épouville (9)	2–0	US Auffay (9)
47.	SS Gournay (9)	1–2	Yvetot AC (6)
48.	AS Madrillet Château Blanc (7)	– (Note: The match was abandoned during the penalty shootout after a player from the home team attacked a photographer. The League disciplinary committee penalised AS Madrillet Château Blanc and Cany FC qualified.)	Cany FC (8)
49.	SC Petit-Couronne (10)	1–2	FC Gisors Vexin Normand (7)
50.	Stade Grand-Quevilly (8)	2–1	AS Fauvillaise (8)
51.	AS Canton d'Argueil (9)	0–2	US Lillebonne (7)
52.	Olympique Pavillais (7)	5–3	US Bolbec (7)
53.	ESI Saint-Antoine (10)	0–2	FC Saint-Julien Petit Quevilly (7)
54.	Olympia'caux FC (7)	0–3	Le Havre Caucriauville Sportif (5)
55.	ES Plateau-Foucarmont-Réalcamp (8)	5–1	FC Le Trait-Duclair (9)
56.	Charleval FC (10)	0–8	Grand-Quevilly FC (6)
57.	US Normande 76 (9)	1–2	FC Neufchâtel (7)
58.	FC Nord Ouest (10)	0–2	Saint Marcel Foot (6)
59.	USF Fécamp (7)	1–1 (6–5 p)	FC Saint-Étienne-du-Rouvray (8)
60.	Évreux FC 27 (6)	2–0	SC Octevillais (7)
61.	ASL Ramponneau (9)	1–1 (2–4 p)	SC Frileuse (8)
62.	Saint-Romain AC (9)	0–7	CMS Oissel (5)
63.	Amicale Houlmoise Bondevillaise FC (9)	0–2	FUSC Bois-Guillaume (7)

=== Fourth round ===
These matches were played on 27 and 28 September 2025.

Fourth Round Results: Normandy
Tie no	Home team (Tier)	Score	Away team (Tier)
1.	ASPTT Caen (6)	1–0	USC Mézidon (6)
2.	Jeunesse Fertoise Bagnoles (7)	2–4	US Avranches (4)
3.	AS Tourlaville (7)	0–2	FC Saint-Lô Manche (6)
4.	CA Pont-Audemer (9)	0–2	SU Dives-Cabourg (5)
5.	ES Coutances (7)	4–0	ES Carpiquet (8)
6.	CS Carentan (7)	1–0	SS Domfrontaise (8)
7.	La Bréhalaise FC (9)	0–0 (3–5 p)	AG Caennaise (6)
8.	Agneaux FC (7)	2–2 (4–3 p)	FC Flers (6)
9.	ASL Chemin Vert (8)	1–1 (4–1 p)	US Mortagnaise (9)
10.	AS Potigny-Villers-Canivet-Ussy (9)	0–4	AS Cherbourg Football (6)
11.	AJS Colleville-Ouistreham (8)	0–1	US Granville (4)
12.	AJ Saint-Hilaire-Petitville (9)	0–4	CS Villedieu (8)
13.	AF Virois (5)	1–2	US Alençon (5)
14.	Maladrerie OS (6)	1–1 (5–4 p)	USON Mondeville (6)
15.	FC Équeurdreville-Hainneville (7)	2–2 (5–4 p)	AS Verson (8)
16.	USM Blainvillaise (9)	0–4	Bayeux FC (6)
17.	ES Angerville/Baux-Sainte-Croix/Plessis-Grohan/Ventes (11)	1–6	FC Val de Risle (9)
18.	ESM Gonfreville (6)	1–1 (4–1 p)	Saint Marcel Foot (6)
19.	US Gasny (8)	1–2	Yvetot AC (6)
20.	CA Lisieux Pays d'Auge (6)	2–2 (7–6 p)	FC Neufchâtel (7)
21.	US Luneraysienne (6)	0–0 (5–6 p)	CMS Oissel (5)
22.	US Épouville (9)	0–3	Évreux FC 27 (6)
23.	SC Frileuse (8)	1–4	Grand-Quevilly FC (6)
24.	FC Saint-Julien Petit Quevilly (7)	2–3	FUSC Bois-Guillaume (7)
25.	FC Ézy-sur-Eure (11)	1–2	Olympique Pavillais (7)
26.	AL Deville-Maromme (7)	5–2	Stade Grand-Quevilly (8)
27.	Le Havre Caucriauville Sportif (5)	1–1 (4–1 p)	AS Trouville-Deauville (5)
28.	FC Gisors Vexin Normand (7)	0–2	Pacy Ménilles RC (6)
29.	AS Andréseinne (8)	3–3 (5–4 p)	ES Plateau-Foucarmont-Réalcamp (8)
30.	US Louviers (10)	0–2	FAC Alizay (7)
31.	Cany FC (8)	0–1	USF Fécamp (7)
32.	US Lillebonne (7)	0–2	FC Dieppe (4)
33.	Stade Porte Normande Vernon (7)	7–1	Stade Vernolien (8)

=== Fifth round ===
These matches were played on 10, 11 and 12 October 2025.

Fifth Round Results: Normandy
Tie no	Home team (Tier)	Score	Away team (Tier)
1.	Évreux FC 27 (6)	4–1	ESM Gonfreville (6)
2.	Agneaux FC (7)	0–5	US Granville (4)
3.	Pacy Ménilles RC (6)	0–4	FC Dieppe (4)
4.	USF Fécamp (7)	0–3	Le Havre Caucriauville Sportif (5)
5.	AS Cherbourg Football (6)	2–5	US Avranches (4)
6.	FC Val de Risle (9)	0–3	Bayeux FC (6)
7.	Olympique Pavillais (7)	1–5	ASPTT Caen (6)
8.	AG Caennaise (6)	1–2	Stade Malherbe Caen (3)
9.	AS Andréseinne (8)	1–1 (4–5 p)	Stade Porte Normande Vernon (7)
10.	Grand-Quevilly FC (6)	0–3	FAC Alizay (7)
11.	US Alençon (5)	1–0	FC Rouen (3)
12.	FC Saint-Lô Manche (6)	3–0	AL Deville-Maromme (7)
13.	ES Coutances (7)	2–0	CA Lisieux Pays d'Auge (6)
14.	FUSC Bois-Guillaume (7)	1–7	SU Dives-Cabourg (5)
15.	ASL Chemin Vert (8)	3–4	Yvetot AC (6)
16.	FC Équeurdreville-Hainneville (7)	1–2	Maladrerie OS (6)
17.	CS Carentan (7)	2–3	CMS Oissel (5)
18.	CS Villedieu (8)	1–2	US Quevilly-Rouen Métropole (3)

=== Sixth round ===
These matches were played on 25 and 26 October 2025.

Sixth Round Results: Normandy
Tie no	Home team (Tier)	Score	Away team (Tier)
1.	Yvetot AC (6)	3–2	FC Saint-Lô Manche (6)
2.	FAC Alizay (7)	0–4	Stade Malherbe Caen (3)
3.	Maladrerie OS (6)	0–1	US Quevilly-Rouen Métropole (3)
4.	CMS Oissel (5)	1–0	US Alençon (5)
5.	ES Coutances (7)	1–2	FC Dieppe (4)
6.	ASPTT Caen (6)	– (Note: Match abandoned at half time with the score 4–0 after Évreux FC 27 refused to continue. Évreux FC 27 ruled to have forfeited the tie.)	Évreux FC 27 (6)
7.	Bayeux FC (6)	1–0	Le Havre Caucriauville Sportif (5)
8.	Stade Porte Normande Vernon (7)	0–4	US Granville (4)
9.	US Avranches (4)	1–1 (5–4 p)	SU Dives-Cabourg (5)
