= Simon Lugier =

French-born French Guianan footballer (born 1989)

Personal information
- Date of birth: 2 August 1989 (age 37)
- Place of birth: Coutances, France
- Height: 1.83 m (6 ft 0 in)
- Position: Goalkeeper

Youth career
- ES Coutances
- US Avranches
- –2008: Caen

Senior career*
Years	Team	Apps	(Gls)
2007–2008	Caen B		
2008–2009	US Avranches		
2009	AS Trouville-Deauville		
2009–2013	AS Cherbourg	88+	(0)
2013–2015	US Avranches	40	(0)
2015–2019	Saint-Malo	96	(0)
2019–2021	Boulogne	40	(0)
2021–2023	Saint-Malo	0	(0)

International career^{‡}
2017–2021	French Guiana	6	(0)

Managerial career
- 2015–????: Saint-Malo (women) (goalkeeper coach)
- 2022–: Saint-Malo (goalkeeper coach)
- * Club domestic league appearances and goals as of 04:03, 9 September 2026 (UTC) ‡ National team caps and goals as of 04:03, 9 September 2026 (UTC)

Simon Lugier (born 2 August 1989) is a football coach and former footballer who played as a goalkeeper. He is currently a goalkeeper coach for Championnat National 1 side US Saint-Malo. Born in France, he represented the French Guiana national team.

== Club career ==
Lugier began his youth career with ES Coutances, before later joining US Avranches and Stade Malherbe Caen. In 2008, at the age of 19, he returned to Avranches for a season. Despite interest from LB Châteauroux at the end of the 2008–2009 season, he joined Division d'Honneur side AS Trouville-Deauville for three months, before becoming AS Cherbourg, becoming the club's third-choice goalkeeper. He spent four years at the club, before returning to Avranches for two season, and then signing for US Saint-Malo in June 2015.

In 2019, he signed for Boulogne, initially as a backup to Riffi Mandanda, before becoming first-choice after Mandanda's departure in 2020.

== International career ==
Lugier was first called up to the French Guiana national team in November 2014, as part of the country's 2014 Caribbean Cup squad. In the summer of 2017, he was included in French Guiana's squads for both the 2017 Caribbean Cup and 2017 CONCACAF Gold Cup.

He made his debut for French Guiana on 17 June 2017, in a 3–0 friendly win against Barbados. He later made four appearances in the 2019–20 CONCACAF Nations League B in 2019, as well as one appearance in a penalty shoot-out defeat to Trinidad and Tobago during 2021 CONCACAF Gold Cup qualification.

== Coaching career ==
After joining US Saint-Malo in 2015, he worked as both a goalkeeper coach for the club's women's team, and the head coach of the club's under-13s team. In July 2022, he was appointed as the goalkeeper coach for Saint-Malo's men's team.

== Personal life ==
Lugier's father was born in Cayenne, French Guiana, allowing him to represent the country's national team.
