= 2023–24 Coupe de France preliminary rounds, Normandy =

French football competition

The 2023–24 Coupe de France preliminary rounds, Normandy is the qualifying competition to decide which teams from the leagues of the Normandy region of France take part in the main competition from the seventh round.

A total of nine teams will qualify from the Normandy section of the 2023–24 Coupe de France preliminary rounds.

In 2022–23, the two teams from the region that progressed furthest in the main competition were US Avranches and AF Virois, who both reached the round of 64. Both lost 2–0 at that stage, to Brest and Nantes respectively.

== Draws and fixtures ==
On 26 June 2023, the league announced that 383 teams from the region had registered for the competition. The draw for the first round, with 129 ties featuring teams from Regional and Departmental divisions, was published on 18 July 2023. The second round draw was published on 22 August 2023, and saw the entry of 107 teams from the Regional divisions.

The third round draw, which saw the five exempted regional teams and the nine teams from Championnat National 3 enter, was published on 31 August 2023. The fourth round draw, featuring the two teams from Championnat National 2, was carried out on 19 September 2023. The fifth round draw, featuring the two teams from Championnat National, was made on 3 October 2023. The sixth and final regional round draw was made on 19 October 2023.

=== First round ===
These matches were played on 19 and 20 August 2023.

First Round Results: Normandy
Tie no	Home team (Tier)	Score	Away team (Tier)
1.	FC Digosville (11)	0–3	AS Querqueville (9)
2.	AS Montebourg (10)	2–1	US Vasteville-Acqueville (10)
3.	CS Barfleur (12)	0–6	ES Plain (9)
4.	Bricqueboscq-Saint-Christophe-Grosville Sport (11)	0–4	SM Haytillon (10)
5.	ES Héauville-Siouville (12)	3–4	ES Quettetot-Rauville (10)
6.	US Pierreville Saint-Germain-le-Gaillard (12)	0–10	PL Octeville (9)
7.	US La Glacerie (10)	1–3	ASS Urville-Nacqueville (9)
8.	Amont-Quentin FC (10)	1–3	SCU Douve Divette (9)
9.	Octeville Hague Sports (12)	1–0 (Note: Octeville Hague Sports penalised for fielding ineligible players, FC Brix Sottevast Saint-Joseph qualify.)	FC Brix Sottevast Saint-Joseph (11)
10.	ÉR Mesnil-au-Val (10)	4–2	AS Pointe Cotentin (10)
11.	US Semilly Saint-André (12)	1–1 (6–7 p)	US Lessay (11)
12.	ES Munevillaise (11)	0–2	AS Bérigny-Cerisy (9)
13.	ASJ Blainville-Saint-Malo (12)	3–3 (3–2 p)	Périers SF (11)
14.	FC Saint-Jean-de-Daye (12)	0–3 (Note: Tie won by means of forfeit.)	AJ Saint-Hilaire-Petitville (9)
15.	ES Trelly Quettreville Contrières (11)	3–2	US Roncey Cerisy (10)
16.	ES des Marais (11)	0–4	FC Sienne (10)
17.	ES Gouville-sur-Mer (10)	1–2	CA Pont-Audemer (8)
18.	ES Marigny Lozon Mesnil Vogot (12)	6–3	Saint-Jean Sports (12)
19.	Créances SF (9)	4–2	FC de l'Elle (9)
20.	Entente Le Lorey-Hauteville-Feugères (10)	3–3 (3–2 p) (Note: Tie reversed from original draw.)	AS Thèreval (8)
21.	AS Brécey (9)	1–2	FC Val Saint-Père (8)
22.	AS Sacey (10)	0–5	US Saint-Quentin-sur-le-Homme (8)
23.	AS Saint-Ovin (12)	0–4	Patriote Saint-Jamaise (9)
24.	US Sainte-Cécile (11)	2–3	US Gavray (10)
25.	US Pontorson (10)	0–1	AS Cerencaise (9)
26.	La Bréhalaise FC (10)	3–0	Espérance Saint-Jean-des-Champs (9)
27.	US Saint-Martin Saint-Jean-de-la Haize (9)	1–5	US Percy (9)
28.	AS Coudeville Hudimesnil (12)	1–3	USM Donville (10)
29.	USCO Sourdeval (10)	1–0	CS Villedieu (9)
30.	ASA Saint-Germain-du-Corbéis (12)	1–7	Hauts du Perche FC (10)
31.	US Mêloise (9)	2–4	AS Berd'huis Foot (9)
32.	FC Mortrée (12)	0–3	AS Courteille Alençon (9)
33.	Soligny-Aspres-Moulins Football (10)	2–1	Sées FC (11)
34.	SL Petruvien (11)	2–3	JS Tinchebray (8)
35.	AS Gacé (9)	2–4	AM La Ferrière-aux-Etangs (10)
36.	US Flerienne (10)	1–6	ES Écouves (8)
37.	US Champsecret Dompierre (10)	1–6	Avenir Messei (9)
38.	AS Boucé (10)	3–6	US Athis (10)
39.	ES Pays d'Ouche (11)	4–5	Stade Vernolien (9)
40.	FL Ségrie-Fontaine (10)	1–6	AS Passais-Saint-Fraimbault (10)
41.	CO Ceaucé (9)	2–2 (5–4 p)	AS Sarceaux Espoir (10)
42.	Amicale Chailloué (12)	2–2 (4–1 p)	Olympique Alençonnais (10)
43.	AS Magny-le-Désert (10)	1–4	OC Briouze (8)
44.	FC Pays Bellêmois (11)	0–3	Espérance Condé-sur-Sarthe (9)
45.	AS Aubusson (none)	0–3	FC Landais (9)
46.	FC Langrune-Luc (none)	0–3	FC Caen Sud Ouest (9)
47.	FC Troarn (9)	6–1	Cresserons-Hermanville-Lion Terre et Mer (10)
48.	AS La Hoguette (11)	1–4	Cingal FC (10)
49.	US Trévières (10)	0–8	Réveil Saint-Germain Courseulles-sur-Mer (9)
50.	US Villerville (10)	1–1 (4–5 p)	US Guérinière (9)
51.	ES Sannerville-Touffréville (10)	1–3	USM Blainvillaise (9)
52.	ASL Chemin Vert (9)	3–2	AS Saint-Vigor-le-Grand (9)
53.	US Pétruvienne (10)	3–3 (4–5 p)	ES Livarotaise (9)
54.	SC Saint-Julien-le-Faucon (12)	0–5	US Pont-l'Évêque (8)
55.	FC Vital (10)	0–2	AS Giberville (9)
56.	AS Glos (11)	0–3	CS Orbecquois-Vespèrois (8)
57.	Croissanville FC (11)	2–10	AS Saint-Désir (9)
58.	Association des Sourds de Caen et du Calvados (12)	3–3 (3–5 p)	Fontenay-le-Pesnel FC (10)
59.	NGS Ver-sur-Mer (12)	2–2 (2–4 p)	FC Mouen (10)
60.	ES Cormelles (9)	1–1 (5–3 p)	ES Thury-Harcourt (9)
61.	JS Audrieu (9)	1–4	ES Portaise (9)
62.	Saint-Paul-du-Vernay FC (9)	5–3	Inter Odon FC (8)
63.	AS Cahagnes (9)	0–5	Lystrienne Sportive (9)
64.	Football Mixte Condé-en-Normandie (10)	0–3	US Aunay-sur-Odon (9)
65.	UA Saint-Sever (10)	4–0	AS Vaudry-Truttemer (10)
66.	Grainville-sur-Odon FC (11)	6–4	US Tilly-sur-Seulles (10)
67.	ASL Ajon (11)	2–3	ES Carpiquet (8)
68.	AS Guilberville (11)	1–3	USI La Graverie (11)
69.	FC Laurentais Boulon (11)	0–5	AF Basly (10)
70.	ES Bonnebosq (9)	3–1	FC Moyaux (10)
71.	Castelet FC (10)	5–4	Association Caen Sud (11)
72.	ES Courtonnaise (11)	1–6	Dozulé FC (10)
73.	ASF Grentheville (10)	3–2	US Authie (10)
74.	FC Baventais (12)	0–8	ESI Vallée de l'Orne (10)
75.	AS Mathieu (12)	0–1	CL Colombellois (9)
76.	IS Caumontaise (11)	1–4	ES Tronquay (10)
77.	Rouen AC (10)	0–0 (4–2 p)	Canteleu FC (10)
78.	Boucle de Seine (10)	1–2	Stade Grand-Quevilly (9)
79.	US Saint-Martin-Osmonville (12)	1–4	GCO Bihorel (9)
80.	AS Buchy (9)	2–3	US Grammont (9)
81.	US Forêt de Roumare (10)	2–1	ES Montigny La Vaupalière (11)
82.	FC Bonsecours Saint Léger (11)	2–4	FC Nord Ouest (10)
83.	Amicale Malaunay (9)	1–3	ASC Jiyan Kurdistan (9)
84.	ASPTT Rouen (10)	0–4	FC Tourville-La-Rivière (9)
85.	AS Mesnières (10)	4–3	AS Gournay-en-Bray (9)
86.	US Allouville Trouville (11)	2–4	Entente Motteville/Croix-Mare (9)
87.	AS Saint-Pierre-de-Varengeville (10)	0–2	FC Tôtes (9)
88.	US Sainte-Marie-des-Champs (12)	0–5	AS Canton d'Argueil (9)
89.	Stade Valeriquais (10)	1–3	Neuville AC (9)
90.	ESI Saint-Antoine (10)	6–3	US Presqu'ile (11)
91.	CA Longuevillais (10)	3–3 (5–6 p)	US Doudeville (9)
92.	AS Tréport (8)	2–1	Entente Vienne et Saâne (9)
93.	AS Sassetot-Thérouldeville (10)	2–2 (5–4 p)	AS Ourville (9)
94.	SS Gournay (9)	2–3	Saint-Romain AC (8)
95.	FC Rolleville (9)	8–0	Union Fontainaise Football (12)
96.	FC Gruchet-le-Valasse (10)	0–2	AS Sainte-Adresse But (8)
97.	FC Manéglise (10)	3–0	ASL Ramponneau (11)
98.	GS Saint-Aubin Saint-Vigor (10)	3–2	Gainneville AC (10)
99.	JS Saint-Léonard 76 (12)	2–4	US Saint-Thomas (11)
100.	FC Bréauté-Bretteville (10)	6–1	FC Fréville-Bouville SIVOM (10)
101.	CA Harfleur Beaulieu (none)	0–3	US Épouville (9)
102.	Le Havre FC 2012 (9)	7–0	US des Falaises (9)
103.	US Sennevillaise (none)	0–3	Caux FC (9)
104.	US Grèges (10)	3–1	US Crielloise (10)
105.	AS Angerville-l'Orcher (11)	4–1	AS La Frénaye (10)
106.	US Normande 76 (9)	3–3 (2–3 p)	US Londinières (10)
107.	Belleville FC (9)	0–0 (3–5 p)	FC Petit Caux (9)
108.	FC Pontois (none)	0–3	US Envermeu (10)
109.	US Bacqueville-Pierreville (9)	1–1 (4–3 p)	ES Janval (9)
110.	CF La Chapelle-du-Bois-des-Faulx (12)	1–3	SC Thiberville (10)
111.	US Louviers (11)	2–1	AS Routot (10)
112.	FC Prey (9)	0–2	La Croix Vallée d'Eure (10)
113.	FC Plateau Nord (11)	0–2	FC Hennezis Vexin Sud (11)
114.	Club Andelle Pîtres (12)	0–6	AS Andréseinne (9)
115.	AS Ailly-Fontaine-Bellenger (11)	2–6	FA Roumois (10)
116.	FC Seine-Eure (9)	2–0	Charleval FC (10)
117.	FC Illiers-l'Évêque (9)	2–1	CS Beaumont-le-Roger (9)
118.	US Barroise (10)	0–3	US Étrépagny (11)
119.	CS Ivry-la-Bataille (10)	3–0	RC Muids-Daubeuf-Vauvray (10)
120.	FC Brionne (11)	1–5	US Rugles-Lyre (8)
121.	RC Léry (12)	4–1	RC Malherbe Surville (12)
122.	AS Loisirs Educatifs Echanges Jeunesse (11)	2–2 (8–9 p)	ES Vallée de l'Oison (9)
123.	Olympique Darnétal (8)	3–1	AS Courcelles (9)
124.	US Cormeilles-Lieurey (10)	0–1	FCI Bel Air (10)
125.	FC Val de Risle (10)	7–0	FC Saint-Maclou-Boulleville (12)
126.	ES Angerville/Baux-Ste Croix/Plessis-Grohan/Ventes (11)	1–4	CS Andelys (8)
127.	AS Vesly (9)	1–1 (5–3 p)	FC Avrais Nonancourt (11)
128.	US Saint-Germain-la-Campagne (10)	3–0	FC Roumois Nord (10)
129.	AS Criquebeuf Football (11)	0–1	FC Garennes-Bueil-La Couture-Breuilpont (8)

=== Second round ===
These matches were played on 26, 27 and 30 August, with one postponed to 6 September 2023.

Second Round Results: Normandy
Tie no	Home team (Tier)	Score	Away team (Tier)
1.	CSSM Le Havre (7)	1–1 (3–4 p)	USF Fécamp (8)
2.	Saint-Romain AC (8)	1–4	Olympia'caux FC (8)
3.	US Bolbec (7)	5–1	US Godervillais (8)
4.	AS Mesnières (10)	0–6	FC Saint-Julien Petit Quevilly (7)
5.	FC Tôtes (9)	3–2	AS Madrillet Château Blanc (8)
6.	ES Plateau-Foucarmont-Réalcamp (7)	0–3	Stade Sottevillais CC (6)
7.	US Auffay (8)	1–5	US Luneraysienne (6)
8.	US Grèges (10)	0–5	FC Offranville (8)
9.	FC Le Trait-Duclair (7)	1–1 (4–5 p)	Olympique Pavillais (6)
10.	FC Petit Caux (9)	1–1 (4–5 p)	AS Tréport (8)
11.	US Bacqueville-Pierreville (9)	0–0 (3–5 p)	ES Tourville (7)
12.	US Envermeu (10)	0–9	Eu FC (8)
13.	US Londinières (10)	3–1	Neuville AC (9)
14.	AS Sassetot-Thérouldeville (10)	1–5	AS Fauvillaise (8)
15.	Caux FC (9)	3–0	JS Saint-Nicolas-d'Aliermont-Béthune (8)
16.	AS Sainte-Adresse But (8)	1–2	Le Havre Caucriauville Sportif (6)
17.	RC Havrais (8)	0–8	Yvetot AC (6)
18.	FC Rolleville (9)	0–1	SC Octevillais (7)
19.	FC Bréauté-Bretteville (10)	1–3	Cany FC (8)
20.	US Saint-Thomas (11)	0–1	GS Saint-Aubin Saint-Vigor (10)
21.	FC Manéglise (10)	1–4	AS Montivilliers (8)
22.	AS Angerville-l'Orcher (11)	1–2	SC Frileuse (8)
23.	US Épouville (9)	2–2 (2–4 p)	ESI Saint-Antoine (10)
24.	CS Gravenchon (8)	5–1	Olympique Havrais Tréfileries-Neiges (7)
25.	US Lillebonne (8)	1–1 (4–3 p)	Le Havre FC 2012 (9)
26.	US Doudeville (9)	1–2	AL Déville-Maromme (7)
27.	FC Neufchâtel (7)	3–0	FUSC Bois-Guillaume (8)
28.	GCO Bihorel (9)	1–4	FC Saint-Étienne-du-Rouvray (8)
29.	US Forêt de Roumare (10)	3–6	Plateau de Quincampoix FC (8)
30.	FC Nord Ouest (10)	1–1 (4–3 p)	Amicale Houlmoise Bondevillaise FC (8)
31.	Rouen AC (10)	1–0	Mont-Saint-Aignan FC (7)
32.	FC Tourville-La-Rivière (9)	2–1	Caudebec-Saint-Pierre FC (7)
33.	AS Canton d'Argueil (9)	2–1	CO Cléon (8)
34.	ASC Jiyan Kurdistan (9)	2–2 (3–4 p)	FC Barentinois (8)
35.	US Grammont (9)	1–1 (1–4 p)	Olympique Darnétal (8)
36.	Entente Motteville/Croix-Mare (9)	0–6	US Mesnil-Esnard/Franqueville (6)
37.	Stade Grand-Quevilly (9)	0–3	Rouen Sapins FC Grand-Mare (7)
38.	US Villers-Bocage (7)	1–2	Bayeux FC (6)
39.	ES Tronquay (10)	0–4	AS Verson (6)
40.	Réveil Saint-Germain Courseulles-sur-Mer (9)	3–3 (8–7 p)	Muance FC (8)
41.	AS Giberville (9)	1–0	CS Honfleur (8)
42.	CS Orbecquois-Vespèrois (8)	0–1	AJS Ouistreham (8)
43.	ESI Vallée de l'Orne (10)	2–1	Castelet FC (10)
44.	USI La Graverie (11)	1–1 (2–3 p)	ES Portaise (9)
45.	CA Lisieux Pays d'Auge (7)	4–2	AS Trouville-Deauville (6)
46.	USON Mondeville (7)	1–3	JS Douvres (7)
47.	AS Potigny-Villers-Canivet-Ussy (8)	3–3 (5–4 p)	ES Cormelles (9)
48.	USM Blainvillaise (9)	1–2	ESFC Falaise (7)
49.	CL Colombellois (9)	2–1	US Pont-l'Évêque (8)
50.	Dozulé FC (10)	1–2	ES Bonnebosq (9)
51.	US Aunay-sur-Odon (9)	5–2	Saint-Paul-du-Vernay FC (9)
52.	US Guérinière (9)	1–2	FC Troarn (9)
53.	ES Livarotaise (9)	2–5	SC Hérouvillais (7)
54.	AS Saint-Désir (9)	3–3 (4–3 p)	USC Mézidon (7)
55.	FC Caen Sud Ouest (9)	0–4	LC Bretteville-sur-Odon (7)
56.	Lystrienne Sportive (9)	1–4	FC Thaon-Bretteville-Le Fresne (8)
57.	Cingal FC (10)	1–1 (3–1 p)	ASL Chemin Vert (9)
58.	Fontenay-le-Pesnel FC (10)	1–1 (4–5 p)	FC Mouen (10)
59.	ES Carpiquet (8)	1–1 (5–4 p)	Bourguébus-Soliers FC (8)
60.	AF Basly (10)	2–0	UA Saint-Sever (10)
61.	AS Ifs (7)	1–2	Maladrerie OS (6)
62.	Grainville-sur-Odon FC (11)	1–5	ASF Grentheville (10)
63.	Hastings FC Rots Cheux Saint-Manvieu Norrey (8)	5–0	USI Bessin Nord (8)
64.	AS Cerencaise (9)	0–0 (1–4 p)	Saint-Hilaire-Virey-Landelles (8)
65.	US Saint-Pairaise (7)	3–0 (Note: Tie reversed from original draw.)	USM Donville (10)
66.	FC Agon-Coutainville (7)	1–1 (5–3 p)	US Ducey-Isigny (7)
67.	Patriote Saint-Jamaise (9)	5–0	La Bréhalaise FC (10)
68.	US Lessay (11)	1–9	ES Pointe Hague (8)
69.	FC Brix Sottevast Saint-Joseph (11)	3–3 (2–4 p)	AS Querqueville (9)
70.	ASS Urville-Nacqueville (9)	1–0	US Côte des Iles (8)
71.	PL Octeville (9)	0–2	AS Valognes (8)
72.	FC Val de Saire (8)	0–2	FC Équeurdreville-Hainneville (6)
73.	ÉR Mesnil-au-Val (10)	0–7	AS Tourlaville (7)
74.	UC Bricquebec (8)	0–0 (7–8 p) (Note: Both teams penalised for fielding suspended players. Neither qualify.)	US Ouest Cotentin (8)
75.	AS Montebourg (10)	4–1	SM Haytillon (10)
76.	ES Quettetot-Rauville (10)	1–3	SCU Douve Divette (9)
77.	FC 3 Rivières (8)	2–3	FC des Etangs (7)
78.	Condé Sports (8)	0–3	CS Carentan (7)
79.	ES Saint-Sauveur-La Ronde-Haye (8)	0–1	Agneaux FC (7)
80.	Créances SF (9)	4–3	US Sainte-Croix Saint-Lô (8)
81.	CA Pontois (8)	0–6	ES Coutances (6)
82.	AJ Saint-Hilaire-Petitville (9)	0–1	Entente Le Lorey-Hauteville-Feugères (10)
83.	US Percy (9)	0–2	Tessy-Moyon Sports (8)
84.	ASJ Blainville-Saint-Malo (12)	2–9	ES Plain (9)
85.	ES Marigny Lozon Mesnil Vogot (12)	0–4	AS Bérigny-Cerisy (9)
86.	US Gavray (10)	0–1	FC Val Saint-Père (8)
87.	ES Trelly Quettreville Contrières (11)	5–4	FC Sienne (10)
88.	US Saint-Quentin-sur-le-Homme (8)	3–0	AS Jullouville-Sartilly (8)
89.	AS Passais-Saint-Fraimbault (10)	1–1 (3–5 p)	USCO Sourdeval (10)
90.	JS Tinchebray (8)	1–1 (4–2 p)	FC Landais (9)
91.	ES Écouves (8)	0–2	FC Argentan (7)
92.	SS Domfrontaise (8)	0–1	Jeunesse Fertoise Bagnoles (6)
93.	AS Berd'huis Foot (9)	0–12	FC Pays Aiglon (8)
94.	Espérance Condé-sur-Sarthe (9)	2–1	US Mortagnaise (8)
95.	Hauts du Perche FC (10)	4–0	Soligny-Aspres-Moulins Football (10)
96.	Amicale Chailloué (12)	1–5	AS Courteille Alençon (9)
97.	US Andaine (8)	0–1	AS La Selle-la-Forge (7)
98.	OC Briouze (8)	2–2 (4–2 p)	CO Ceaucé (9)
99.	AM La Ferrière-aux-Etangs (10)	0–3	Leopards Saint-Georges (8)
100.	US Athis (10)	2–1	Avenir Messei (9)
101.	FA Roumois (10)	2–1	ES Normanville (7)
102.	CS Andelys (8)	1–3	Saint-Sébastien Foot (7)
103.	FC Gisors Vexin Normand (6)	5–1	Saint Marcel Foot (7)
104.	RC Léry (12)	0–10	Pacy Ménilles RC (6)
105.	FCI Bel Air (10)	2–2 (4–2 p)	FC Pays du Neubourg (8)
106.	FC Garennes-Bueil-La Couture-Breuilpont (8)	1–1 (2–4 p)	FC Val de Reuil (6)
107.	La Croix Vallée d'Eure (10)	2–1	AS Vesly (9)
108.	FC Val de Risle (10)	0–3	FC Serquigny-Nassandres (7)
109.	Stade Vernolien (9)	2–1	CS Ivry-la-Bataille (10)
110.	FAC Alizay (8)	5–0	FC Illiers-l'Évêque (9)
111.	CA Pont-Audemer (8)	0–6	FC Seine-Eure (9)
112.	SC Thiberville (10)	0–2	US Conches (8)
113.	US Louviers (11)	0–2	Saint-Aubin FC (8)
114.	FC Hennezis Vexin Sud (11)	0–3 (Note: Tie won by means of forfeit.)	US Gasny (8)
115.	US Rugles-Lyre (8)	2–2 (1–4 p)	ES Vallée de l'Oison (9)
116.	FC Eure Madrie Seine (8)	1–2	Stade Porte Normande Vernon (6)
117.	AS Andréseinne (9)	2–1	Romilly Pont-Saint-Pierre FC (7)
118.	US Étrépagny (11)	4–2	US Saint-Germain-la-Campagne (10)

=== Third round ===
These matches were played on 16 and 17 September 2023.

Third Round Results: Normandy
Tie no	Home team (Tier)	Score	Away team (Tier)
1.	Rouen AC (10)	3–2	AS Fauvillaise (8)
2.	FC Nord Ouest (10)	2–1	AL Déville-Maromme (7)
3.	ES Vallée de l'Oison (9)	1–5	Olympique Pavillais (6)
4.	FC Tôtes (9)	1–2	ES Mont-Gaillard (6)
5.	GS Saint-Aubin Saint-Vigor (10)	1–2	US Étrépagny (11)
6.	US Lillebonne (8)	2–2 (5–4 p)	US Luneraysienne (6)
7.	FC Barentinois (8)	6–1 (Note: Tie reversed from original draw.)	Plateau de Quincampoix FC (8)
8.	CMS Oissel (5)	1–1 (4–1 p)	FC Gisors Vexin Normand (6)
9.	US Londinières (10)	0–6	AS Villers Houlgate Côte Fleurie (5)
10.	Cany FC (8)	1–1 (4–2 p)	CS Gravenchon (8)
11.	FCI Bel Air (10)	1–8	Le Havre Caucriauville Sportif (6)
12.	Eu FC (8)	1–0	Rouen Sapins FC Grand-Mare (7)
13.	AS Canton d'Argueil (9)	0–2	SC Octevillais (7)
14.	FC Offranville (8)	2–2 (4–2 p)	FC Neufchâtel (7)
15.	FC Tourville-La-Rivière (9)	0–1	FA Roumois (10)
16.	Olympique Darnétal (8)	0–6	FC Dieppe (5)
17.	USF Fécamp (8)	3–0	AS Montivilliers (8)
18.	AS Tréport (8)	0–7	ESM Gonfreville (6)
19.	SC Frileuse (8)	2–6	US Bolbec (7)
20.	ESI Saint-Antoine (10)	2–2 (5–4 p)	ES Tourville (7)
21.	FC Saint-Julien Petit Quevilly (7)	2–0	Yvetot AC (6)
22.	Olympia'caux FC (8)	1–1 (3–4 p)	Caux FC (9)
23.	FC Saint-Étienne-du-Rouvray (8)	2–2 (6–7 p)	Stade Porte Normande Vernon (6)
24.	ASPTT Caen (5)	0–1	SU Dives-Cabourg (5)
25.	FC Seine-Eure (9)	0–3	Évreux FC 27 (7)
26.	SC Hérouvillais (7)	1–1 (5–4 p)	ESFC Falaise (7)
27.	Stade Vernolien (9)	0–2	ES Carpiquet (8)
28.	FC Thaon-Bretteville-Le Fresne (8)	2–1	Saint-Aubin FC (8)
29.	AS Saint-Désir (9)	0–3	JS Douvres (7)
30.	La Croix Vallée d'Eure (10)	2–2 (4–2 p)	AJS Ouistreham (8)
31.	Réveil Saint-Germain Courseulles-sur-Mer (9)	0–1	Grand-Quevilly FC (6)
32.	Hauts du Perche FC (10)	0–3	CA Lisieux Pays d'Auge (7)
33.	ASF Grentheville (10)	2–2 (4–5 p)	CL Colombellois (9)
34.	US Gasny (8)	1–3	FAC Alizay (8)
35.	AS Giberville (9)	1–0	US Mesnil-Esnard/Franqueville (6)
36.	AS Potigny-Villers-Canivet-Ussy (8)	1–3	AG Caennaise (5)
37.	ESI Vallée de l'Orne (10)	0–4	Hastings FC Rots Cheux Saint-Manvieu Norrey (8)
38.	ES Bonnebosq (9)	0–1	US Conches (8)
39.	FC Troarn (9)	1–1 (3–4 p)	FC Serquigny-Nassandres (7)
40.	AF Basly (10)	1–8	FC Pays Aiglon (8)
41.	Pacy Ménilles RC (6)	1–2	FC Val de Reuil (6)
42.	AS Andréseinne (9)	1–2	Stade Sottevillais CC (6)
43.	FC Mouen (10)	2–1	Cingal FC (10)
44.	LC Bretteville-sur-Odon (7)	1–2	Saint-Sébastien Foot (7)
45.	Bayeux FC (6)	0–4	FC Saint-Lô Manche (5)
46.	Leopards Saint-Georges (8)	1–0	AS Bérigny-Cerisy (9)
47.	SCU Douve Divette (9)	2–0	JS Tinchebray (8)
48.	AS Querqueville (9)	0–2	AS Cherbourg Football (8)
49.	walkover (Note: Due to the disqualification of both UC Bricquebec and US Ouest Cotentin in match 74 of the second round.)	–	Tessy-Moyon Sports (8)
50.	USCO Sourdeval (10)	0–2	ES Plain (9)
51.	Agneaux FC (7)	3–1	Jeunesse Fertoise Bagnoles (6)
52.	US Athis (10)	0–5	ES Coutances (6)
53.	Patriote Saint-Jamaise (9)	0–3	FC Argentan (7)
54.	US Aunay-sur-Odon (9)	1–4	US Alençon (5)
55.	AS Verson (6)	1–2	FC des Etangs (7)
56.	AS Valognes (8)	0–3	Maladrerie OS (6)
57.	AS Montebourg (10)	0–8	AS Tourlaville (7)
58.	AS La Selle-la-Forge (7)	0–9	FC Flers (5)
59.	AS Courteille Alençon (9)	1–5	OC Briouze (8)
60.	ES Trelly Quettreville Contrières (11)	0–7	ES Pointe Hague (8)
61.	Saint-Hilaire-Virey-Landelles (8)	1–4	FC Équeurdreville-Hainneville (6)
62.	FC Val Saint-Père (8)	0–1	US Saint-Quentin-sur-le-Homme (8)
63.	CS Carentan (7)	3–1	US Saint-Pairaise (7)
64.	ASS Urville-Nacqueville (9)	2–4	Espérance Condé-sur-Sarthe (9)
65.	Entente Le Lorey-Hauteville-Feugères (10)	2–2 (3–4 p)	FC Agon-Coutainville (7)
66.	ES Portaise (9)	3–1	Créances SF (9)

=== Fourth round ===
These matches were played on 30 September and 1 October 2023.

Fourth Round Results: Normandy
Tie no	Home team (Tier)	Score	Away team (Tier)
1.	SCU Douve Divette (9)	0–4	AG Caennaise (5)
2.	ES Plain (9)	1–3	ES Coutances (6)
3.	CL Colombellois (9)	3–7	FC Thaon-Bretteville-Le Fresne (8)
4.	FC des Etangs (7)	2–2 (4–2 p)	Agneaux FC (7)
5.	FC Mouen (10)	1–8	AS Tourlaville (7)
6.	US Saint-Quentin-sur-le-Homme (8)	3–3 (2–3 p)	Tessy-Moyon Sports (8)
7.	CS Carentan (7)	1–3	AF Virois (4)
8.	FC Flers (5)	1–0	US Granville (4)
9.	FC Pays Aiglon (8)	4–1	FC Agon-Coutainville (7)
10.	AS Cherbourg Football (8)	0–1	FC Saint-Lô Manche (5)
11.	OC Briouze (8)	4–2	AS Giberville (9)
12.	JS Douvres (7)	7–0	Hastings FC Rots Cheux Saint-Manvieu Norrey (8)
13.	ES Carpiquet (8)	2–3	Leopards Saint-Georges (8)
14.	SC Hérouvillais (7)	1–6	US Alençon (5)
15.	Espérance Condé-sur-Sarthe (9)	2–3	ES Pointe Hague (8)
16.	ES Portaise (9)	1–2	FC Argentan (7)
17.	FC Équeurdreville-Hainneville (6)	2–1	Maladrerie OS (6)
18.	Saint-Sébastien Foot (7)	0–1	Stade Sottevillais CC (6)
19.	Caux FC (9)	2–2 (4–5 p)	Cany FC (8)
20.	Eu FC (8)	2–1	Stade Porte Normande Vernon (6)
21.	Olympique Pavillais (6)	4–5	CMS Oissel (5)
22.	US Étrépagny (11)	1–3	US Conches (8)
23.	Évreux FC 27 (7)	5–0	ES Mont-Gaillard (6)
24.	CA Lisieux Pays d'Auge (7)	4–2	SC Octevillais (7)
25.	ESI Saint-Antoine (10)	1–1 (4–5 p)	FAC Alizay (8)
26.	FA Roumois (10)	0–3	ESM Gonfreville (6)
27.	USF Fécamp (8)	2–3	FC Val de Reuil (6)
28.	US Lillebonne (8)	2–0	FC Offranville (8)
29.	FC Serquigny-Nassandres (7)	1–2	FC Barentinois (8)
30.	Rouen AC (10)	0–2	Le Havre Caucriauville Sportif (6)
31.	Grand-Quevilly FC (6)	1–2	AS Villers Houlgate Côte Fleurie (5)
32.	US Bolbec (7)	2–5	FC Dieppe (5)
33.	FC Saint-Julien Petit Quevilly (7)	1–3	SU Dives-Cabourg (5)
34.	La Croix Vallée d'Eure (10)	2–2 (5–4 p)	FC Nord Ouest (10)

=== Fifth round ===
These matches were played on 14 and 15 October 2023.

Fifth Round Results: Normandy
Tie no	Home team (Tier)	Score	Away team (Tier)
1.	AS Tourlaville (7)	1–2	SU Dives-Cabourg (5)
2.	US Alençon (5)	0–3	FC Dieppe (5)
3.	FC Pays Aiglon (8)	2–0 (Note: Match stopped by the referee after 80 minutes, after violence in the stands. Eu FC refused to restart the game, and the referee abandoned the match. FC Pays Aiglon qualify.)	Eu FC (8)
4.	FC Val de Reuil (6)	1–4	US Avranches (3)
5.	AS Villers Houlgate Côte Fleurie (5)	3–2	FC Saint-Lô Manche (5)
6.	FC Argentan (7)	1–1 (9–10 p)	FC Barentinois (8)
7.	Tessy-Moyon Sports (8)	1–3	JS Douvres (7)
8.	ES Coutances (6)	1–2	FC Équeurdreville-Hainneville (6)
9.	FC des Etangs (7)	1–2	FC Flers (5)
10.	Leopards Saint-Georges (8)	3–2	Stade Sottevillais CC (6)
11.	Évreux FC 27 (7)	1–3	AG Caennaise (5)
12.	US Conches (8)	0–2	ESM Gonfreville (6)
13.	ES Pointe Hague (8)	1–0	OC Briouze (8)
14.	FC Thaon-Bretteville-Le Fresne (8)	0–0 (10–11 p)	Le Havre Caucriauville Sportif (6)
15.	CA Lisieux Pays d'Auge (7)	0–3	FC Rouen (3)
16.	La Croix Vallée d'Eure (10)	3–2	Cany FC (8)
17.	US Lillebonne (8)	1–6	AF Virois (4)
18.	FAC Alizay (8)	0–2	CMS Oissel (5)

=== Sixth round ===
These matches were played on 28 and 29 October 2023.

Sixth Round Results: Normandy
Tie no	Home team (Tier)	Score	Away team (Tier)
1.	ESM Gonfreville (6)	2–3	AS Villers Houlgate Côte Fleurie (5)
2.	FC Flers (5)	2–0	CMS Oissel (5)
3.	FC Pays Aiglon (8)	1–3	FC Dieppe (5)
4.	AG Caennaise (5)	2–2 (5–4 p)	Le Havre Caucriauville Sportif (6)
5.	JS Douvres (7)	1–0	Leopards Saint-Georges (8)
6.	ES Pointe Hague (8)	1–3	SU Dives-Cabourg (5)
7.	US Avranches (3)	0–0 (3–1 p)	AF Virois (4)
8.	La Croix Vallée d'Eure (10)	1–1 (2–4 p)	FC Équeurdreville-Hainneville (6)
9.	FC Barentinois (8)	0–5	FC Rouen (3)
