= AS Trouville-Deauville-Villers =

- Full name: Association sportive Trouville-Deauville-Villers
- Founded: 1899
- Ground: stade du commandant Hébert
- Capacity: 1,500
- Chairman: Emmanuel Schreder and Alain Leverrier
- Manager: Cédric Hoarau
- League: Championnat National 2
Home colours

AS Trouville-Deauville-Villers is a French football club based in Deauville. They are currently playing at the Championnat National 2 level.

== History ==
The club was founded in 1899, as AS Trouville-Deauville by Férault Larue, director of the boys' school in Trouville, along with Englishman, Mr. Balchin, stud-groom at the Méautis stud farm belonging to Baron de Rothschild, as technical advisor.

The club played in the regional leagues until the end of the 1978-79 season when they won promotion to Division 4 after winning the Division d'honneur Normandie. The club spent eight seasons in Division 4 before being relegated back to the Division d'honneur Normandie.

Apart from two seasons over the next 38 years the club remained in the regional leagues, with just the 2008-09 and 2010-11 season seeing the club play in the fifth tier as part of the CFA 2. Despite the club winning the Regional 1 Normandie Group A league in the 2023-24 season, it wasn't automatically promoted as the French football league system was being restructured so only one team could be promoted from the Normandie leagues, which meant a play off against Group B winners Grand Quevilly, which saw them lose 3-0. The following season the club won the division again and gained promotion to the Championnat National 2, where they have remained since.

In 2025 the club merged with AS Villers-Houlgate to become AS Trouville-Deauville-Villers.

== Ground ==
The club play their home games at the stade du commandant Hébert. The club have played at the stadium since May 1933.

The stadium was named after Georges Hébert a naval officer during the First World War, who created an institution dedicated to the physical education of women in Deauville. The stadium has a capacity of 1,500 with a stand containing 380 seats.

== Honour ==
- DH Normandie (4) 1942-43, 1978-79, 2023-24, 2024-25
- DH Basse Normandie (1) 2007-08
- Coupe de Normandie (2) 1937-38, 1939-40

== Notable players ==
- (France) Mathieu Duhamel
- (Spain) Ladislas Lozano
- (Cameroon) Banana Yaya
- (Cameroon) Jacques Zoua
- (France) Simon Lugier
- (Ivory Coast) Alain Gouaméné
- (France) Robin Lapert
- (France) Kévin Goba

== Notable Managers ==
- (Spain) Ladislas Lozano
- (France) Raymond Bellot
- (Algeria) Noël Tosi
- (France) Alexis Bertin
