= Sami Gtari =

Franco-Tunisian footballer

Personal information
- Full name: Sami Steve Gtari
- Date of birth: March 7, 1981 (age 45)
- Place of birth: Paris, France
- Height: 1.78 m (5 ft 10 in)
- Position: Midfielder

Senior career*
Years	Team	Apps	(Gls)
1999–2000	Louhans-Cuiseaux 71 B		
2000–2001	UFCP Argentan		
2001–2002	SM Caen B		
2002–2003	US Saint-Georges-les-Ancizes		
2003–2004	Étoile du Sahel		
2004–2005	Gençlerbirliği S.K.		
2005	Diyarbakırspor		
2006–2007	Stade Tunisien		
2007–2010	APEP Pitsilia		
2010–2012	Évreux FC 27		
2012–2014	FC Chalon-sur-Saône		
- * Club domestic league appearances and goals as of 1 December 2024

Sami Steve Gtari (born 7 March 1981) is a Franco-Tunisian former professional footballer who played as a left-sided midfielder. Born in Paris, he spent his career across France, Tunisia, Turkey and Cyprus, appearing for clubs in both top-flight and lower-division competitions.

Gtari began his senior career with the reserve team of Louhans-Cuiseaux 71 during the 1999–2000 season before moving to UFCP Argentan. In 2001–02, he joined the reserve side of SM Caen. He then played for US Saint-Georges-les-Ancizes before signing with Étoile du Sahel for the 2003–04 campaign.

After a season in Tunisia, Gtari moved to Turkey, where he played for Gençlerbirliği in the Turkish Süper Lig and later Diyarbakırspor. He returned to Tunisia in 2005 to join Stade Tunisien, remaining for one season before signing with Cypriot club APEP Pitsilia in 2007. He spent three years in Cyprus, scoring twice in nine league appearances.

In 2010, Gtari returned to France, joining Évreux FC 27 and later FC Chalon-sur-Saône, where he played until 2014.
