= Losseni Konaté =

Ivorian footballer

Personal information
- Full name: Losseni Konaté
- Date of birth: December 29, 1972 (age 53)
- Place of birth: Ivory Coast
- Position: Goalkeeper

Youth career
- ASEC Mimosas

Senior career*
Years	Team	Apps	(Gls)
1989–2003	ASEC Mimosas		
2003–2004	US Monastir		
2004–2005	JJK Jyväskylä		

International career
1987	Ivory Coast U17		
1991	Ivory Coast U20		
1992–2002	Ivory Coast		
Medal record
Representing Ivory Coast
Africa Cup of Nations
Gold medal – first place	1992 Senegal	Team
- * Club domestic league appearances and goals

Losseni Konaté (born 29 December 1972) is a former Ivorian professional footballer who played as a goalkeeper. He spent most of his career with ASEC Mimosas and was considered one of the most successful goalkeepers in the history of the club. At international level, he represented the Ivory Coast national football team during the 1990s and early 2000s and was widely regarded as the successor of Alain Gouaméné.

== Club career ==
Konaté began his professional career with ASEC Mimosas in 1989. During the 1990s the club dominated Ivorian football, and Konaté established himself as the team's first-choice goalkeeper. With ASEC he won numerous domestic titles, including multiple Ivorian Ligue 1 championships and national cups.

One of the most notable achievements of his club career came in 1998 when ASEC Mimosas won the CAF Champions League. The club defeated Dynamos F.C. of Zimbabwe in the final, securing the first Champions League title in the club's history. Konaté was an important member of the squad during the club’s successful continental campaigns throughout the decade.

After leaving ASEC Mimosas in the early 2000s, Konaté continued his career abroad. He played for US Monastir in Tunisia and later joined Finnish club JJK Jyväskylä. These moves marked the final years of his professional playing career before he retired from competitive football.

== International career ==
Konaté represented the Ivory Coast national football team for many years and was regularly called up during the 1990s. He took part in several editions of the Africa Cup of Nations, including the tournaments in 1992, 1994, 1998 and 2002.

He was a member of the Ivory Coast squad that won the 1992 African Cup of Nations in Senegal, the first continental title in the country's history.

At youth level, Konaté represented Ivory Coast at the 1987 FIFA U-16 World Championship in Canada and the 1991 FIFA World Youth Championship in Portugal.

== Coaching career ==
After retiring as a player, Konaté moved into coaching and worked mainly as a goalkeeping coach. He has held coaching roles at several clubs in Asia, particularly in Thailand and Myanmar, where he worked with a number of professional teams.

== Honours ==
=== Club ===
ASEC Mimosas

- Côte d'Ivoire Premier Division: 1990, 1991, 1992, 1993, 1994, 1995, 1997, 1998, 2000, 2001, 2002, 2003
- Côte d'Ivoire Cup: 1990, 1995, 1997, 1999, 2003
- Félix Houphouët-Boigny Cup: 1990, 1994, 1995, 1997, 1998, 1999
- CAF Champions League: 1998
- CAF Super Cup: 1999
- West African Club Championship (UFOA Cup): 1990
- Peace Cup: 2001

=== International ===
Ivory Coast

- Africa Cup of Nations: 1992
