= Alex Augustine =

Réunion footballer and administrator (born 1956)

Personal information
- Full name: Alex Pierre Adrien Augustine
- Date of birth: 8 September 1956 (age 70)
- Place of birth: Fort-de-France, Martinique
- Position: Forward

Senior career*
| Years | Team | Apps | (Gls) |
| –1974 | Le Havre Caucriauville Sportif | | |
| 1974–1978 | Le Havre B | | |
| 1978–1981 | Le Havre | 5 | (0) |
| 1982 | CS Saint-Denis | | |
| 1982–1983 | AM Neiges | | |
| 1983–1984 | CA Castets-en-Dorthe | | |
| 1984 | JS Saint-Pierroise | | |
| 1985–1988 | CS Saint-Denis | | (20+) |
| 1989–1990 | JS Saint-Pierroise | | |
| 1991 | CS Saint-Denis | | |
| 1992 | AS Saint-Louisienne | | |
| 1993 | AS Marsouins | | |
| 1994 | MJC Sainte-Suzanne | | |
| 1995 | JS Gauloise | | |
| 1996 | US Saint-André Léopards | | |
| 1997 | US Desbassyns | | |
| 2001 | AS Chaudron | 1 | (0) |

International career
| 1986–1990 | Réunion | 4 | (1) |

Managerial career
- 2015: US Sainte-Marienne (technical director)
- 2020: AS Bretagne
- * Club domestic league appearances and goals

Alex Pierre Adrien Augustine (born 8 September 1956) is a football administrator and former footballer who played as a forward. Born in Martinique, he represented the Réunion national team.

== Playing career ==
Augustine began his career in France with Le Havre Caucriauville Sportif, before joining Le Havre AC, where he made five appearances in the French Division 2. After brief stints in the fifth division of French football, he played for multiple clubs in Réunion, notably for CS Saint-Denis and JS Saint-Pierroise.

He made four appearances for the Réunion national team between 1986 and 1990, including at the 1990 Indian Ocean Island Games.

== Post-playing career ==
In June 2015, Augustine was the technical director of US Sainte-Marienne, with the club competing in the inaugural Paris World Games that year. Between November 2015 and December 2016, he served as the interim president of the Ligue réunionnaise de football, the football federation of Réunion.

In September 2020, he announced his intentions to run for president, losing the election a few months later to incumbent Yves Ethève. Shortly after, he filed a complaint over voting irregularities to the Saint-Denis judicial court, who annulled the election's results in May 2023. However, the decision was overturned following an appeal in December 2025, with the courts ordering Augustine to pay the federation €5,500 in compensation.

Augustine tried running for the presidency again in 2024, but was disqualified from entering the election, alongside two other candidates, with the decision later being appealed to the French National Olympic and Sports Committee.

== Personal life ==
Augustine's daughter, Valérie Gauvin, is a footballer who represented the France women's national team at the 2019 FIFA Women's World Cup.
