= Rosny-sur-Seine =

- Commune
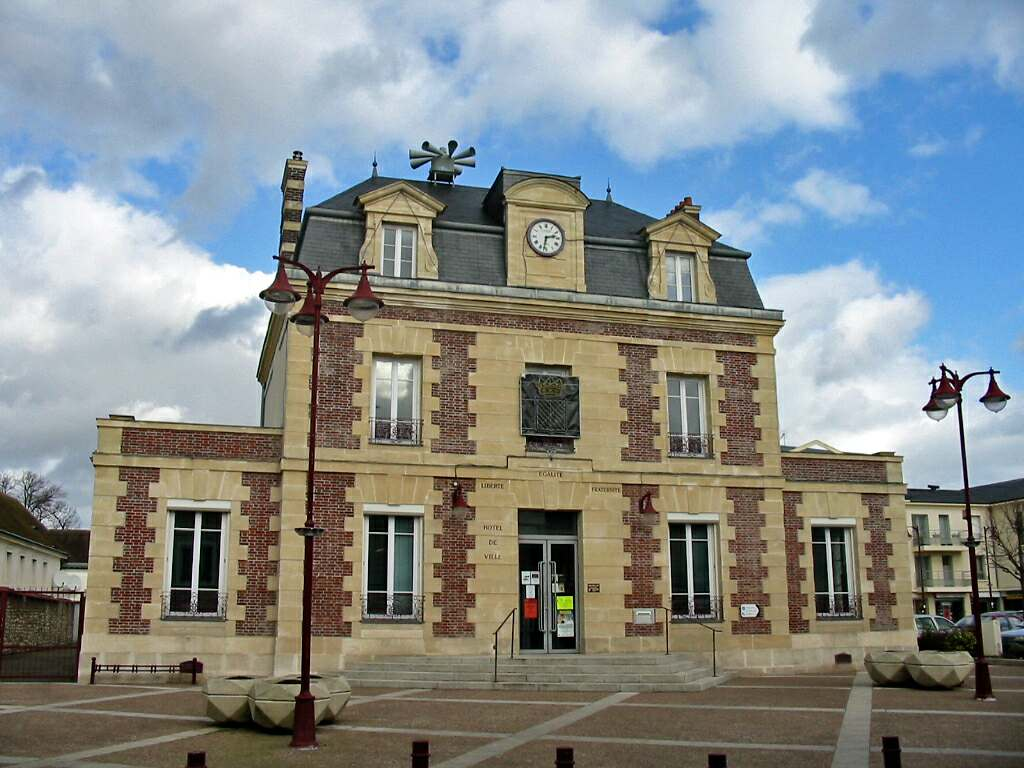
- Town hall

- Coat of arms
- Location of Rosny-sur-Seine
- Location within France Location within Île-de-France (region)
- Coordinates: 49°00′02″N 1°37′57″E
- Country: France
- Region: Île-de-France
- Department: Yvelines
- Arrondissement: Mantes-la-Jolie
- Canton: Mantes-la-Jolie
- Intercommunality: CU Grand Paris Seine et Oise

Government
  - Mayor (2026–2032): Michel Royneau
- Area^{1}: 19.36 km^{2} (7.47 sq mi)
- Elevation: 30 m (98 ft)
- Highest elevation: 144 m (472 ft)
- Lowest elevation: 17 m (56 ft)
- Population (2023): 7,328
  - Density: 378.5/km^{2} (980.3/sq mi)
- Time zone: UTC+01:00 (CET)
  - Summer (DST): UTC+02:00 (CEST)
- INSEE/Postal code: 78531 /78710
- ^{1} French Land Register data, which excludes lakes, ponds, glaciers > 1 km^{2} (0.386 sq mi or 247 acres) and river estuaries.

Rosny-sur-Seine (French pronunciation: [ʁoni syʁ sɛn], literally Rosny on Seine) is a commune in the Yvelines department in the Île-de-France in north-central France.

== Population ==
Historical population
Year	Pop.	±% p.a.
1968	2,796	—
1975	3,541	+3.43%
1982	3,932	+1.51%
1990	4,606	+2.00%
1999	4,758	+0.36%
2007	5,181	+1.07%
2012	5,689	+1.89%
2017	6,433	+2.49%
2023	7,328	+2.19%
Source: INSEE

== Notable people ==
- Roger Géri - (1947 – 2019) a French professional footballer died here.

== See also ==
- Communes of the Yvelines department
