= Kader N'Chobi =

Ivorian association footballer

Personal information
- Full name: Yapo Kader N'Chobi
- Date of birth: 17 November 1995 (age 30)
- Place of birth: Bingerville, Ivory Coast
- Height: 1.77 m (5 ft 10 in)
- Position: Forward

Team information
- Current team: Dieppe

Youth career
- 2005–2007: CFFP Orly
- 2007–2008: Paris Saint-Germain
- 2008–2010: Boulogne-Billancourt
- 2010–2013: Valenciennes
- 2013–2014: Red Star
- 2014–2015: Nantes

Senior career*
Years	Team	Apps	(Gls)
2015–2016	Oissel	2	(0)
2016–2017	Mantois	9	(1)
2017–2018	AL Deville-Maromme		
2018–2020	Rouen	37	(11)
2020–2021	Cholet	27	(11)
2021–2023	Laval	60	(10)
2023–2025	Dijon	29	(2)
2023–2025	Dijon II	5	(2)
2025–	Dieppe	0	(0)
- * Club domestic league appearances and goals as of 7 December 2024

Yapo Kader N'Chobi (born 17 November 1995) is an Ivorian professional footballer who plays as a forward for Championnat National 1 club Dieppe.

== Career ==
Born in the Ivory Coast, N'Chobi moved to France at a young age and was a member of the youth academies of CFFP Orly, Paris Saint-Germain, Boulogne-Billancourt, Valenciennes, Red Star and Nantes. After being released by Nantes, he began his senior career with the semi-pro club Oissel in the Championnat National 3. He moved to Mantois in 2016, where he made 9 appearances without scoring, then moved the following season to AL Deville-Maromme. He started finding his form with Rouen in 2018, earning him a transfer to Cholet in the summer of 2020. He transferred to Laval on 3 June 2021, signing a 2+1 year contract. He helped Laval win the 2021–22 Championnat National, earning promotion to the Ligue 2 for the 2022–23 season.

== Honours ==
Laval

- Championnat National: 2021–22
