= Château de Logempré =

Castle in Normandy, France

Coordinates: 49°20′01″N 1°17′06″E

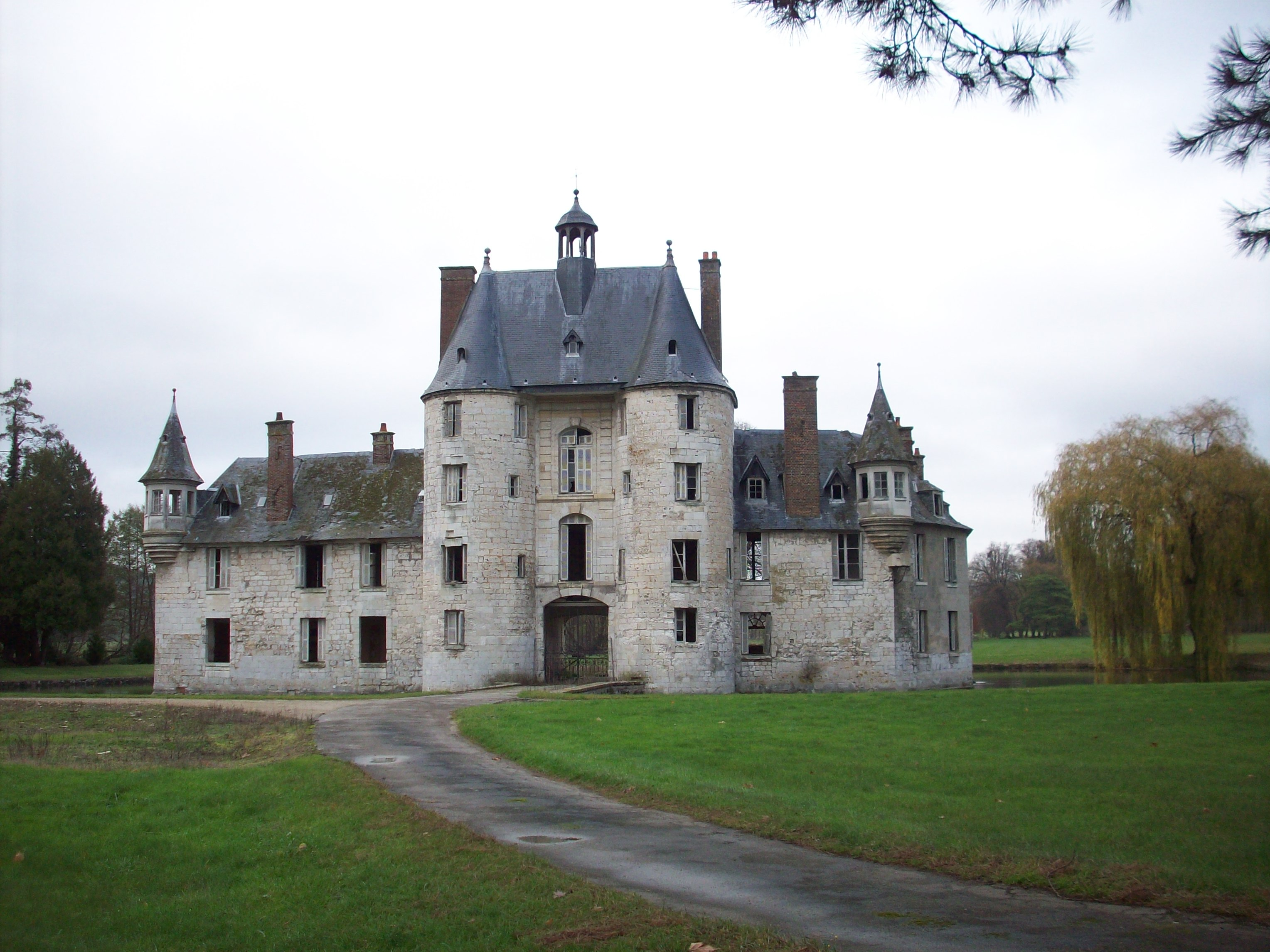
Château de Logempré in 2010

Château de Logempré is a fortified château in the French commune of Pont-Saint-Pierre in the Eure department, in Normandy. The first château at the site was built during the reign of William the Conqueror. The current structure dates between the 17th and 19th centuries. It was abandoned in the late 20th century and is undergoing renovation in the 2020s with money from the French Heritage Lottery.

== Structure ==
Château de Logempré is located in the valley of the Andelle river in Pont-Saint-Pierre, in Eure in Normandy.

The Château dates to the 17th and 19th centuries. It was built with local stone in a renaissance style. It initially had four wings surrounding an interior courtyard, with one wing now lost. The moats and cobblestones date to the medieval period. It is surrounded by a moat and a river and sits on 23 hectares of land.

== History ==
The first château at the site was built during the era of William the Conqueror. It was destroyed by the French during the Hundred Years' War to slow the English advance. Charles V had the castle rebuilt with a grant of 20,000 gold pounds. In 1418, King Henry V of England seized the castle and it was later burned by the French. The Roncherolles family rebuilt it in the late 15th century. In 1590, King Henry IV and Gabrielle d'Estrées stayed there during his military campaigns in Normandy. In a deed dated 1600, it is described as a "stone castle with a drawbridge, covered with slate, commonly known as Logempré, enclosed and surrounded by moats filled with water." It was remodeled in the late 18th century by the Marquis de Montesquieu, then by Antoine Caillot de Coqueréaumont, an ancestor of the Baron d'Houdemare, who restored it at the end of the 19th century. It was later owned by members of Houdemare de Vandrimare and Descamps-Beghin families.

In 1946, the château appeared in the film Pas si bête, starring French comedic actor Bourvil. In 1998, it was abandoned by its owner, who had tried to cover the failing roof. The leaking water over the following twenty years caused extensive rot in the building's wooden structure. In 2023, with the building in an advanced state of ruin, it was purchased by a couple who wish to restore it. The owners are currently undertaking a major restoration project of the building, with assistance of the Friends of the Château de Pont-Saint-Pierre association which was established in June 2024.

In 2025, the château was selected as the project in Normandy to receive €500,000 from the annual Heritage Lottery. The money from the lottery will be used to seal and stabilize the building to stop the continuing water damage. This will allow for restoration work to begin on the inside of the building. The owners plan to also rehabilitate the outbuildings to create a visitor centre and overnight accommodation for tourists, with all revenue going to the site's rehabilitation. They plan to host visitors at the property for European Heritage Days in 2026.
