= Alain Gouaméné =

Ivorian footballer (born 1966)

Personal information
- Full name: Pierre Alain Gouaméné Guiahouli
- Date of birth: 15 June 1966 (age 60)
- Place of birth: Gagnoa, Ivory Coast
- Height: 1.83 m (6 ft 0 in)
- Position: Goalkeeper

Senior career*
Years	Team	Apps	(Gls)
1986–1991	ASEC Mimosas		
1991–1992	Raja Casablanca		
1992–1994	ASEC Mimosas		
1994–1995	AS Trouville-Deauville		
1995–2000	Toulouse	58	(0)

International career
1987–2000	Ivory Coast	58	(0)

Managerial career
- Ivory Coast U23
Medal record
Men's football
Representing Ivory Coast
Africa Cup of Nations
Winner	1992 Senegal
Third place	1994 Tunisia
FIFA Confederations Cup
Third place	1992 Saudi Arabia
- * Club domestic league appearances and goals

Pierre Alain Gouaméné Guiahouli (born 15 June 1966) is an Ivorian former professional footballer who played as a goalkeeper. He is the head coach of the Ivory Coast U23 national team.

== Club career ==
Gouaméné played for ASEC Mimosas, Raja Casablanca, AS Trouville-Deauville, and FC Toulouse.

== International career ==
Gouaméné holds the record of games (24) and participations (seven) in the African Nations Cup as goalkeeper of the Ivory Coast national team. He was succeeded in the Elephants' goal by Losseni Konaté in 2000.

== Coaching career ==
After his playing career, Gouaméné was goalkeeper coach of the national team and in summer 2006 changed posts to become national coach of the Ivory Coast teams Under-15 and Under 17.
