= Mathieu Duhamel =

French footballer (born 1984)

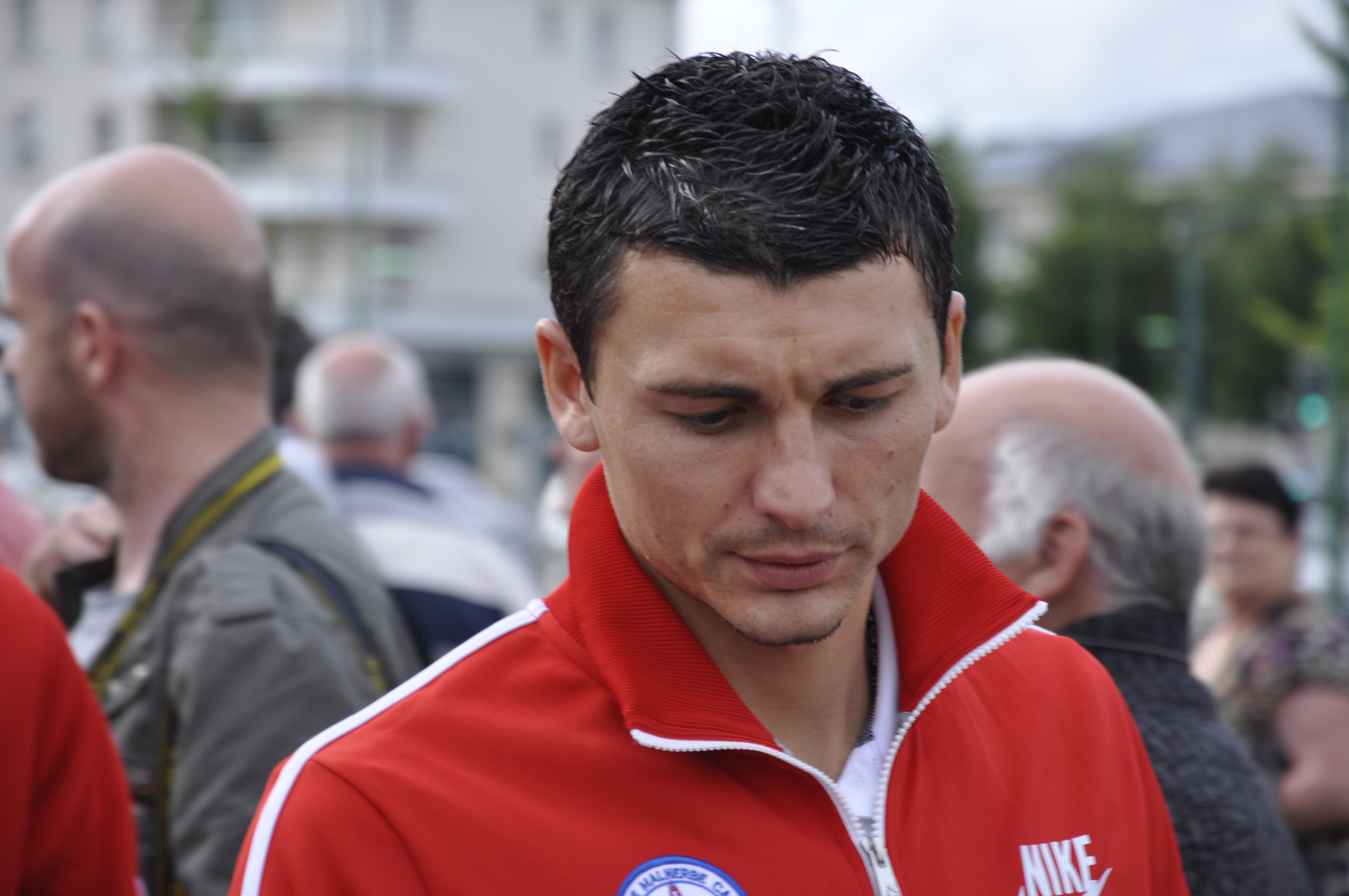
- Duhamel in 2012

Personal information
- Date of birth: 12 July 1984 (age 42)
- Place of birth: Mont-Saint-Aignan, France
- Height: 1.83 m (6 ft 0 in)
- Position: Striker

Youth career
- 1991–1997: Quevilly
- 1997–2000: INF Clairefontaine
- 2000–2001: Rouen
- 2001–2003: Quevilly

Senior career*
Years	Team	Apps	(Gls)
2003–2006	Quevilly	22	(3)
2006–2007	Rouen	29	(12)
2007–2008	Romorantin	29	(9)
2008–2009	Laval	33	(11)
2009–2010	Créteil	29	(17)
2010–2011	Troyes	13	(1)
2011	→ Metz (loan)	18	(9)
2011–2012	Metz	34	(10)
2012–2015	Caen	86	(43)
2015	→ Evian (loan)	11	(4)
2015–2017	Le Havre	45	(14)
2017–2018	Quevilly-Rouen	19	(8)
2018	Foggia	11	(1)
2018–2020	Grand-Quevilly	10	(8)
2020–2021	Beauvais	3	(1)
2021–2022	RPFC	6	(4)
2022–2023	Saint-Julien		
2023-2024	AS Trouville-Deauville		
- * Club domestic league appearances and goals

Mathieu Duhamel (born 12 July 1984) is a French former professional footballer who played for as a striker. A former graduate of the Clairefontaine academy, he has played for a host of semi-professional and amateur clubs before securing a move to professional club Troyes ahead of the 2010–11 season.

== Career ==
Born in Mont-Saint-Aignan, Duhamel started his career at US Quevilly. In 1997, he was selected to attend the Clairefontaine academy and, while training at the academy's facilities during the weekdays, trained at a local Parisian club on the weekends. Duhamel also at a stint at the youth academy of FC Rouen. After departing Clairefontaine, he returned to Quevilly and spent three seasons on the club's senior team amassing 22 appearances in the Championnat de France amateur. In 2006, he returned to Rouen and scored 12 goals in 26 appearances during his one season at the club. His season at Rouen led to Duhamel signing with Championnat National club SO Romorantin.

The following season, Duhamel joined Stade Lavallois and recorded 11 goals in 22 appearances. His performances helped the club achieve promotion to Ligue 2. He was, however, not retained by the club and remained in the third division after signing with US Créteil-Lusitanos. While at Créteil, Duhamel had his best season to date appearing in 26 matches and scoring 17 goals, fourth-best in the league.

On 10 June 2010, after a successful campaign with Créteil, Duhamel joined Championnat National club Troyes on a three-year contract.

On 23 December 2010, he signed on a season-long loan deal with Ligue 2 side FC Metz before the end of the 2010–11 campaign. Six months after the loan deal became a permanent deal.

On 20 August 2015, Duhamel signed for Ligue 2 club Le Havre.

In 2017 he moved to Ligue 2 side Quevilly-Rouen.

On 15 January 2018, he was signed by Italian Serie B club Foggia.

Duhamel returned to France for the 2018–19 season, signing with Régional 1 side Grand-Quevilly FC. After two years with the club, during which time they were promoted to, and relegated from, Championnat National 3, he signed for AS Beauvais Oise in Championnat National 2. In June 2021, he joined Romilly-Pont Saint Pierre FC. A year later, he joined Régional 3 side FC Saint-Julien and also announced, that he would retire at the end of the 2022–23 season. However he decided to sign and play for AS Trouville-Deauville for the 2023-24 season.
