= Michaël Barré =

French footballer (born 1974)

Personal information
- Date of birth: August 31, 1974 (age 52)
- Place of birth: Carentan, France
- Height: 1.80 m (5 ft 11 in)
- Position: Defender

Senior career*
| Years | Team | Apps | (Gls) |
| 1995–1998 | Saint-Lô | | |
| 1998–2000 | Caen (B team) | | |
| 1999–2000 | Caen | 8 | (0) |
| 2000–2011 | AS Cherbourg | | |

Managerial career
- 2010 - 2017: ES Coutances
- * Club domestic league appearances and goals as of 13:42, 30 November 2009 (UTC)

Michaël Barré (born August 31, 1974, in Carentan) is a French professional football player.

He played on the professional level in Ligue 2 for SM Caen.

After playing he managed ES Coutances for seven seasons.
