= Jean-Luc Fugaldi =

French footballer (1946–2005)

Personal information
- Full name: Jean-Luc Fugaldi
- Date of birth: 23 August 1946 (age 80)
- Place of birth: Lille, France
- Date of death: January 6, 2005 (aged 58)
- Place of death: Valenciennes, France
- Position: Centre-back

Senior career*
Years	Team	Apps	(Gls)
1966–1975	CS Sedan Ardennes		
1975–1979	Valenciennes FC		
1979-1981	→ UFCP Argentan		

Managerial career
- 1979–1981: UFCP Argentan
- * Club domestic league appearances and goals

Jean-Luc Fugaldi (23 August 1946 – 6 January 2005) was a French professional footballer who played as a centre-back for CS Sedan Ardennes, Valenciennes FC and UFCP Argentan. At UFCP Argentan he was a player manager.
