= Christian Kinkela =

Congolese professional footballer (born 1982)

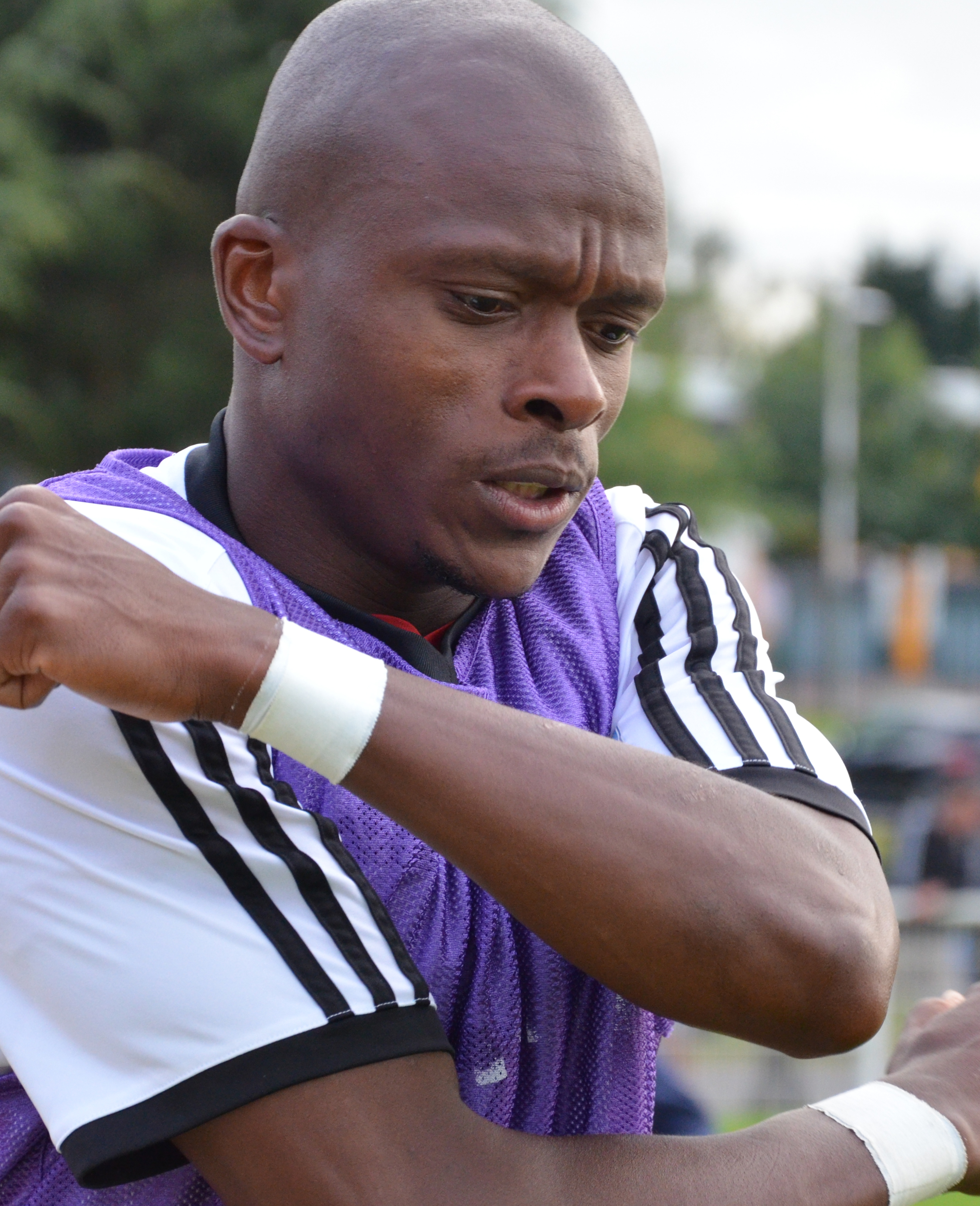
- Kinkela in 2016

Personal information
- Full name: Christian Fuanda Luzolo Kinkela
- Date of birth: 25 May 1982 (age 44)
- Place of birth: Kinshasa, Zaire
- Height: 1.75 m (5 ft 9 in)
- Position: Right winger

Youth career
- 1998-2001: Red Star

Senior career*
Years	Team	Apps	(Gls)
2001–2002	Laval B	24	(0)
2002–2003	Tours	25	(2)
2003–2004	Union Saint-Gilloise	9	(0)
2004–2005	RC Paris	29	(2)
2005–2007	Amiens	43	(3)
2007	Paris FC	17	(7)
2008–2009	Boulogne	27	(4)
2009–2012	Ajaccio	99	(18)
2012–2013	Sedan	8	(0)
2013	Moreirense	8	(0)
2013–2014	Châteauroux	25	(3)
2014–2015	Paris FC	28	(9)
2016	WS Bruxelles	4	(0)
2017	FC Chambly	19	(1)
2018	SO Romorantin	9	(1)
2018–2019	Caen B		
2019–2020	Noisy-le-Grand FC	8	(0)
2020	AS Muret	3	(1)
2020–2021	AS Portugais Bourges		
2021–2022	Jura Dolois	4	(0)
2023	Le Havre Caucriauville Sportif		

International career
2004–2012	Congo DR	25	(1)
- * Club domestic league appearances and goals as of 1 July 2022

Christian Fuanda Kinkela (born 25 May 1982) is a Congolese professional footballer who plays as a right winger. He made 25 appearances for the Congo DR national team scoring one goal.

== Club career ==
Kinkela signed a two-year deal for AC Ajaccio from Ligue 1 side US Boulogne on 17 July 2009.

== International career ==
Kinkela made his Congo DR national team debut in 2004. He was a member of the Congo squad at the 2006 African Nations Cup which progressed to the quarter finals, where it was eliminated by Egypt, which eventually won the tournament.
