= Raymond Bellot =

French footballer (1929–2019)

Personal information
- Date of birth: 9 June 1929
- Place of birth: Alfortville, France
- Date of death: 24 February 2019 (aged 89)
- Position: Attacking midfielder

Senior career*
Years	Team	Apps	(Gls)
1950–1953	RC Paris	52	(0)
1953–1955	Toulouse	58	(10)
1955–1958	Monaco	89	(9)
1959–1964	Stade Français	168	(9)

International career
1958	France	0	(0)

Managerial career
- 1964–1965: AS Trouville-Deauville
- 1965–1970: ES Viry-Châtillon
Medal record
Representing France
FIFA World Cup
Third place	1958 Sweden
- * Club domestic league appearances and goals

Raymond Bellot (9 June 1929 – 24 February 2019) was a French footballer. He was part of the French squad which finished third at the 1958 FIFA World Cup, but he never won a cap for the France national football team.

== Club career ==
- 1950-1953: RC Paris
- 1953-1955: Toulouse FC
- 1955–1958: AS Monaco FC
- 1959-1964: Stade Français

== Awards ==
- Third place in the 1958 World Cup with France
