= Fred Dembi =

Congolese footballer (born 1995)

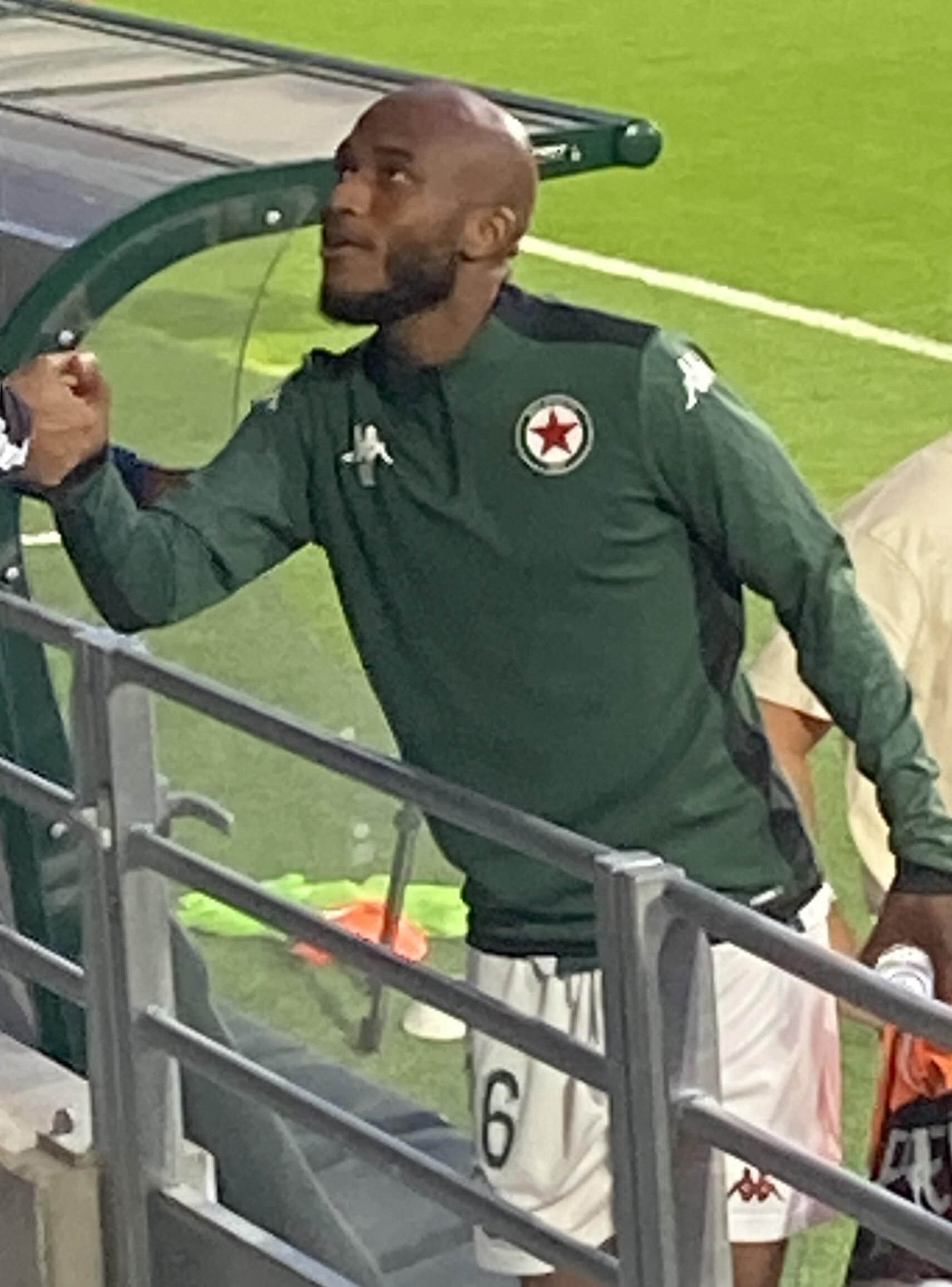
- Dembi with Red Star in 2024

Personal information
- Full name: José-Fred Dembi
- Date of birth: 21 February 1995 (age 31)
- Place of birth: Pointe-Noire, Republic of the Congo
- Height: 1.84 m (6 ft 0 in)
- Position: Midfielder

Team information
- Current team: Hassania Agadir

Youth career
- 2001–2004: AS Madrillet Château Blanc
- 2004–2014: Quevilly

Senior career*
Years	Team	Apps	(Gls)
2014–2015	Quevilly II	19	(2)
2014–2015	Quevilly	5	(0)
2015–2016	Le Havre II	20	(1)
2016–2017	Avranches II	4	(1)
2016	Avranches	0	(0)
2017–2018	Déville Maromme		
2018–2020	Rouen	37	(4)
2020–2021	Cholet	25	(0)
2021	Orléans II	1	(0)
2021–2022	Orléans	29	(1)
2022–2025	Red Star	87	(1)
2025–	Hassania Agadir	0	(0)

International career
2022	Congo	1	(0)
- * Club domestic league appearances and goals as of 13 May 2025

José-Fred Dembi (born 21 February 1995) is a Congolese professional footballer who plays as a midfielder for Moroccan club Hassania Agadir. He played for the Congo national team.

== Early life ==
Dembi was born in the Republic of the Congo, and moved to France at the age of 2. He acquired French nationality subsequently.

== Club career ==
Dembi is a youth product of AS Madrillet Château Blanc and Quevilly, and began his career with Quevilly in 2014. He followed that up with stints at the reserves of Le Havre and Avranches, followed with an amateur stint with Déville Maromme. In the summer of 2018, he moved to Rouen, and his second season was cut short by the COVID-19 epidemic. For the 2020–21 season, he moved to Cholet. He then joined Orléans in the Championnat National the following season. On 27 May 2022, he transferred to Red Star.

== International career ==
Dembi was called up to the Congo national team for a set of 2023 Africa Cup of Nations qualification matches in June 2022. That window he made his debut with the Congo in a 1–0 win over the Gambia on 8 June 2022.

== Honours ==
Déville Maromme

- Régional 1: 2017–2018

Rouen

- Championnat National 3: 2018–19

Red Star

- Championnat National: 2023–24
