= Romilly-sur-Andelle =

- Commune
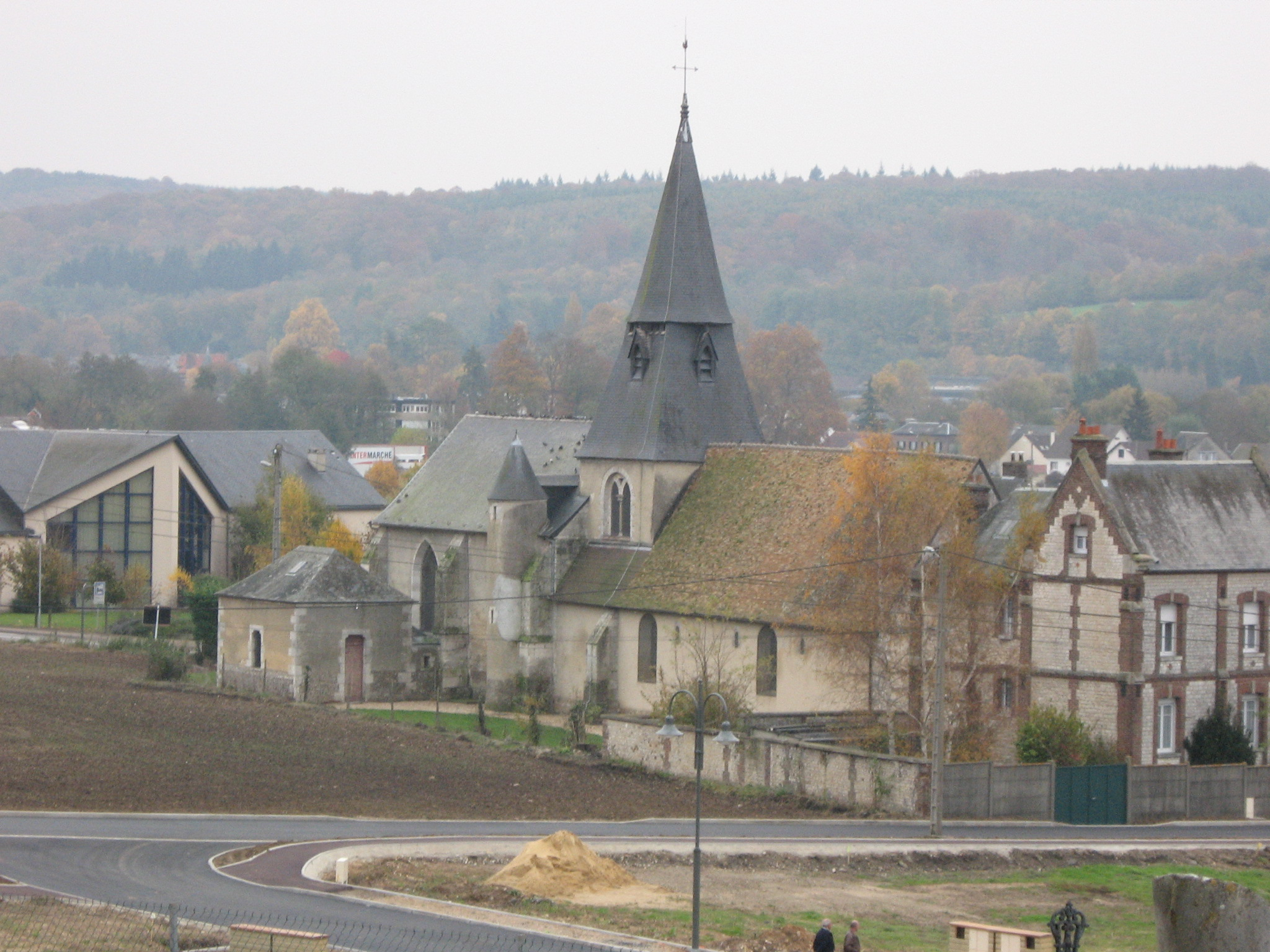
- The church in Romilly-sur-Andelle

- Coat of arms
- Location of Romilly-sur-Andelle
- Location within France Location within Normandy
- Coordinates: 49°19′55″N 1°15′35″E
- Country: France
- Region: Normandy
- Department: Eure
- Arrondissement: Les Andelys
- Canton: Romilly-sur-Andelle

Government
  - Mayor (2020–2026): Jean-Luc Romet
- Area^{1}: 8.53 km^{2} (3.29 sq mi)
- Elevation: 17 m (56 ft)
- Highest elevation: 155 m (509 ft)
- Lowest elevation: 5 m (16 ft)
- Population (2023): 3,234
  - Density: 379/km^{2} (982/sq mi)
- Time zone: UTC+01:00 (CET)
  - Summer (DST): UTC+02:00 (CEST)
- INSEE/Postal code: 27493 /27610
- ^{1} French Land Register data, which excludes lakes, ponds, glaciers > 1 km^{2} (0.386 sq mi or 247 acres) and river estuaries.

Romilly-sur-Andelle (French pronunciation: [ʁɔmiji syʁ ɑ̃dɛl], literally Romilly on Andelle) is a commune in the Eure department in northern France.

== Population ==
Historical population

Year	Pop.	±% p.a.
1793	640	—
1800	780	+2.87%
1806	803	+0.49%
1821	917	+0.89%
1831	1,015	+1.02%
1836	1,079	+1.23%
1841	1,118	+0.71%
1846	1,169	+0.90%
1851	1,147	−0.38%
1856	1,313	+2.74%
1861	1,366	+0.79%
1866	1,369	+0.04%
1872	1,369	+0.00%
1876	1,380	+0.20%
1881	1,398	+0.26%
1886	1,485	+1.21%
1891	1,527	+0.56%
1896	1,293	−3.27%
1901	1,641	+4.88%

Year	Pop.	±% p.a.
1906	1,566	−0.93%
1911	1,705	+1.72%
1921	1,606	−0.60%
1926	1,604	−0.02%
1931	1,596	−0.10%
1936	1,481	−1.48%
1946	1,564	+0.55%
1954	1,525	−0.32%
1962	1,779	+1.94%
1968	1,981	+1.81%
1975	2,249	+1.83%
1982	2,524	+1.66%
1990	2,658	+0.65%
1999	2,655	−0.01%
2007	2,619	−0.17%
2012	3,126	+3.60%
2017	3,261	+0.85%
2023	3,234	−0.14%

Source: EHESS and INSEE (1968-2023)

== Sport ==
The commune has a football club Romilly-Pont-Saint-Pierre FC, shared with the neighborouhing commmune of Pont-Saint-Pierre who play at Stade Gaston-Philbert.

== See also ==
- Communes of the Eure department
