= Pont-Saint-Pierre =

- Commune
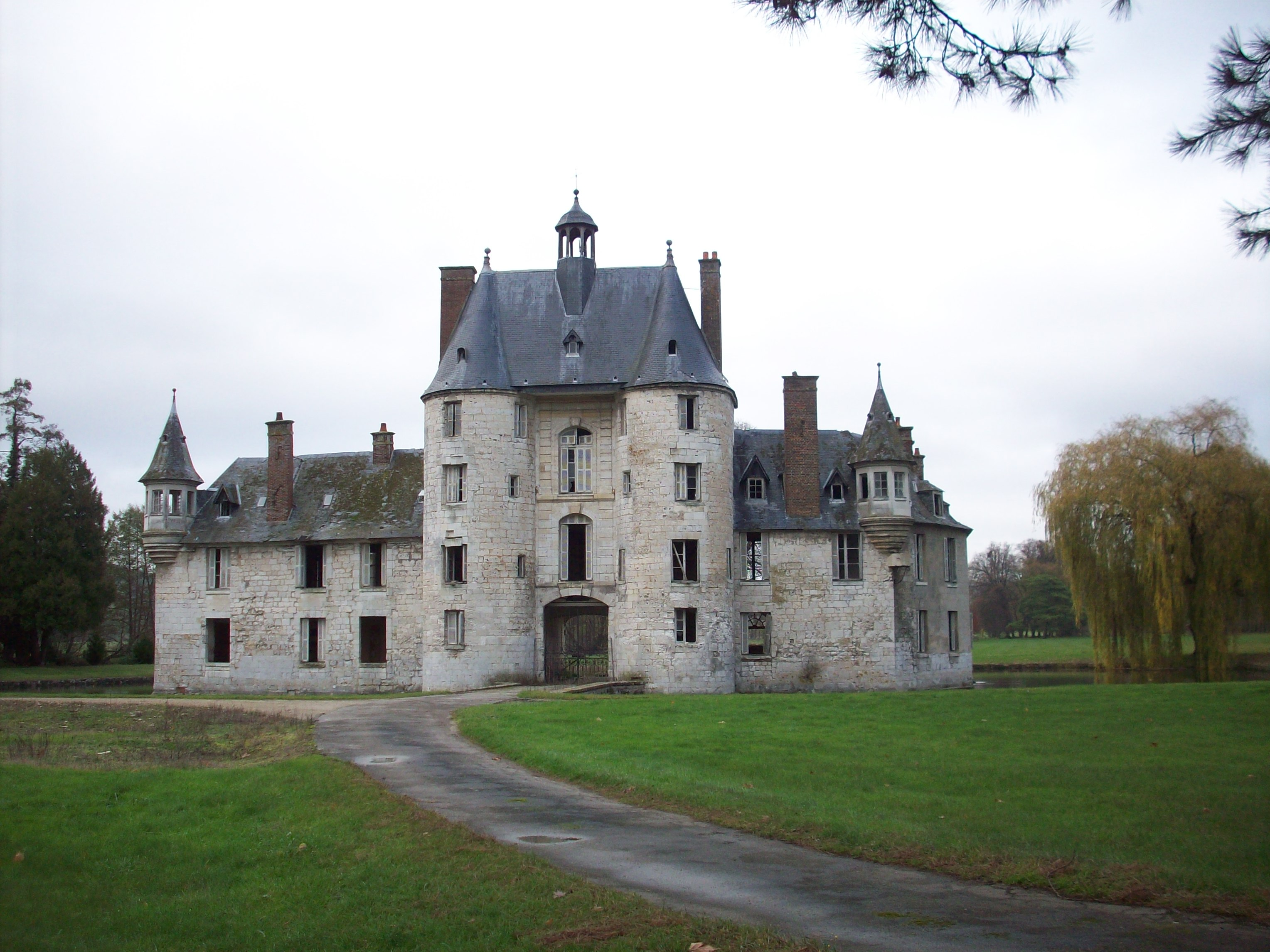
- Château de Logempré
- Location of Pont-Saint-Pierre
- Location within France Location within Normandy
- Coordinates: 49°20′01″N 1°17′06″E
- Country: France
- Region: Normandy
- Department: Eure
- Arrondissement: Les Andelys
- Canton: Romilly-sur-Andelle

Government
  - Mayor (2020–2026): Valérie Lavigne
- Area^{1}: 6.9 km^{2} (2.7 sq mi)
- Elevation: 17 m (56 ft)
- Highest elevation: 157 m (515 ft)
- Lowest elevation: 10 m (33 ft)
- Population (2023): 1,155
  - Density: 170/km^{2} (430/sq mi)
- Time zone: UTC+01:00 (CET)
  - Summer (DST): UTC+02:00 (CEST)
- INSEE/Postal code: 27470 /27360
- ^{1} French Land Register data, which excludes lakes, ponds, glaciers > 1 km^{2} (0.386 sq mi or 247 acres) and river estuaries.

Pont-Saint-Pierre (French pronunciation: [pɔ̃ sɛ̃ pjɛʁ]) is a commune in the Eure department in Normandy in northern France.

== Population ==
Historical population
| Year | Pop. | ±% p.a. |
|---|---|---|
| 1968 | 1,046 | — |
| 1975 | 1,065 | +0.26% |
| 1982 | 994 | −0.98% |
| 1990 | 882 | −1.48% |
| 1999 | 935 | +0.65% |
| 2007 | 1,119 | +2.27% |
| 2012 | 1,153 | +0.60% |
| 2017 | 1,151 | −0.03% |
| 2023 | 1,155 | +0.06% |
Source: INSEE

== Sport ==
The commune has a football club Romilly-Pont-Saint-Pierre FC, shared with the neighborouhing commmune of Romilly-sur-Andelle who play at Stade Gaston-Philbert.

== See also ==
- Communes of the Eure department
