= Roger Géri =

French footballer (1947–2019)

Personal information
- Full name: Roger Victor Géri
- Date of birth: 1 February 1947
- Place of birth: Marseille, France
- Date of death: 22 July 2019 (aged 72)
- Place of death: Rosny-sur-Seine, France
- Height: 1.72 m (5 ft 8 in)
- Position: Right-back

Youth career
- SBSC Belle de Mai
- 0000–1964: US Cheminots Marseille
- 1964–1967: Olympique de Marseille

Senior career*
Years	Team	Apps	(Gls)
1967–1969	Olympique de Marseille	0	(0)
1969–1970	RFC Paris-Neuilly	43	(2)
1971	FC Sochaux-Montbéliard	8	(0)
1971–1973	FC Lorient	67	(0)
1973–1974	US Dunkerque	24	(0)
1974–1977	AS Poissy		
1978–1979	SO Mazamet		
1979–1980	Le Touquet AC		

International career
1969	France Amateurs		

Managerial career
- 1978–1979: SO Mazamet
- 1979–1980: Le Touquet AC
- Olympique Argentan
- CA Mantes-la-Ville
- AS Mantes-la-Jolie
- * Club domestic league appearances and goals

Roger Victor Géri (1 February 1947 – 22 July 2019) was a French professional footballer who played as a right-back and later worked as a manager.

== Playing career ==
Born in Marseille, Géri began playing youth football with SBSC Belle de Mai and US Cheminots Marseille before joining Olympique de Marseille in 1964.

During his professional career, he played for Olympique de Marseille, RFC Paris-Neuilly, FC Sochaux-Montbéliard, FC Lorient, and US Dunkerque, before moving into non-professional football with AS Poissy, SO Mazamet, and Le Touquet AC. He was also a French military champion in 1967 and earned selections for the France amateur team in 1969.

== Managerial career ==
After retiring from playing, he managed several lower-league clubs, including SO Mazamet, Le Touquet AC, Olympique Argentan, CA Mantes-la-Ville, and AS Mantes-la-Jolie.
