= Robin Lapert =

French footballer (born 1997)

Personal information
- Date of birth: 29 November 1997 (age 28)
- Place of birth: Le Havre, France
- Height: 6 ft 1 in (1.85 m)
- Position: Defender

Team information
- Current team: AS Trouville-Deauville-Villers

Youth career
- 2014–2015: Le Havre

College career
Years	Team	Apps	(Gls)
2017	Charleston Golden Eagles	21	(5)
2018–2021	UConn Huskies	40	(4)

Senior career*
Years	Team	Apps	(Gls)
2015–2017	Le Havre II	9	(1)
2017	Arras FA	0	(0)
2022–2023	Hartford Athletic	29	(1)
- ESM Gonfreville
2025	AS Villers-Houlgate		
2025-	AS Trouville-Deauville-Villers		
- * Club domestic league appearances and goals as of 22:58, 19 October 2023 (UTC)

Robin Lapert (born 29 November 1997) is a French professional footballer who plays for AS Trouville-Deauville-Villers.

== Career ==
=== Youth ===
Lapert began his career spending three years with the Le Havre AC academy, where he spent a season with the club's under-19 side and two playing in the Championnat National 2 and Championnat National 3. Following his release by Le Havre in the summer of 2017, he signed with Arras FA, but opted to leave following the preseason to pursue the opportunity to play college soccer in the United States.

=== College ===
In 2017, Lapert arrived at the University of Charleston, going on to make 21 appearances for the Golden Eagles, scoring five goals and adding a single assist on the way to help the team to win the National Championship. 2018 saw Lapert transfer to the University of Connecticut, who he made 40 appearances for, scoring four goals and tallying one assist in his three seasons with the Huskies.

Following college, Lapert was eligible in the 2021 MLS SuperDraft, but went undrafted.

=== Professional ===
On 1 September 2022, Lapert signed with USL Championship club Hartford Athletic. He made his debut for Hartford on 17 September 2022, appearing as a 86th-minute substitute during a 3–0 win over Las Vegas Lights. On 26 November 2022, it was announced Lapert would remain with Hartford for their upcoming 2023 season.

In January 2025 he signed for AS Villers-Houlgate from ESM Gonfreville. AS Villers-Houlgate at the end of the 2024-25 season merged with AS Trouville-Deauville to form AS Trouville-Deauville-Villers and Robin has since remained with this club.
