= Bobby Brown (footballer, born 1953) =

English footballer and manager

Personal information
- Full name: Robert Brown
- Date of birth: 24 November 1953 (age 72)
- Place of birth: Plymouth, England
- Position: Striker

Senior career*
Years	Team	Apps	(Gls)
1972–1974	Chelsea	0	(0)
1974–1976	Sheffield Wednesday	21	(3)
1975–1976	→ Aldershot (loan)	5	(0)
1976–1980	Boston United	114	(60)
1980	Thionville	4	(0)
1980–1981	Boston United	21	(7)
1981–1983	Caen		

Managerial career
- 1983–1988: US Argentan
- 1988–1989: MOS Caen
- 1994–1998: Bourges
- 1998–2002: Dunkerque
- 2003–2004: Boulogne
- * Club domestic league appearances and goals

Bobby Brown (born 24 November 1953) is an English former football player and manager.

== Playing career ==
Brown played for Chelsea, Sheffield Wednesday, Aldershot F.C., Boston United, Thionville and Caen.

== Coaching career ==
He managed French sides US Argentan, MOS Caen, Bourges, Dunkerque and Boulogne.
