= Thomas Bosmel =

French professional footballer (born 1988)

Personal information
- Date of birth: 18 April 1988 (age 38)
- Place of birth: Caen, France
- Height: 1.84 m (6 ft 0 in)
- Position: Goalkeeper

Senior career*
Years	Team	Apps	(Gls)
2010–2014	Caen	4	(0)
2014–2015	Arles-Avignon	9	(0)
2016–2020	Mondeville	26	(0)
2020–2021	MOS Caen		
- * Club domestic league appearances and goals as of 08:19, 26 March 2023 (UTC)

Thomas Bosmel (born 18 April 1988) is a retired French professional footballer who played as a goalkeeper for Caen.
