= Romilly-Pont-Saint-Pierre FC =

- Full name: Romilly-Pont-Saint-Pierre Football Club
- Founded: 1990
- Ground: stade Gaston-Philbert
- Capacity: 1,0000
- Chairman: Roger Dubuisson
- Manager: Mohammed Diakhaby
- League: Régional 2
Home colours

Romilly-Pont-Saint-Pierre FC is a French football club based in Romilly-sur-Andelle. They are currently playing at the Régional 2 level.

== History ==
The club was established on 20 June 1990 from the merger of two local clubs, Cercle Athlétique Romillois (C.A.R.) and Entente Sportive Pont Saint Pierre - Douville (E.S.P.D.).

The club played in the local, departmental and regional leagues until the end of the 2019-20 campaign, where they won the Regional league and were promoted to the Championnat National 3, the fifth tier of the French football league system. However they could only survive two seasons in the National 3, the first stopped short from the COVID-19 pandemic and were relegated back again to the Regional leagues, where they have remained since.

== Ground ==
The club play their home games at the Stade Gaston-Philbert. The stadium was named after Gaston Philbert, a former mayor of the commune and local business owner.The stadiums grand stand is owned by the neighboring commune of Pont-Saint-Pierre, which faced a prolonged structural closure beginning in August 2020 due to safety concerns and a €51,000 renovation deficit. The stadium has a capacity of 1,000.

== Notable Players ==
- (France) Mathieu Duhamel
