= Condé Sports =

- Full name: Condé Sports
- Founded: 1942
- Ground: Stade Henri Binet
- Chairman: Romain Viard
- Manager: Stéphane Bérel
- League: Régional 3
Home colours

Condé Sports is a French football club based in Condé-sur-Vire. They are currently playing at the Régional 3 level.

== History ==
The club was founded in 1942. The club played in various departmental and regional leagues until the end of the 1987-88 season when they won the Ligue Basse-Normandie and promoted to Division 4. The club spent five seasons in Division 4 before being relegated back to the Regional leagues, where they have remained since.

== Ground ==
The club play their home games at the Stade Henri Binet. The stadium is named after the first president of the club Mr. Henri Binet.

== Honours ==
- Ligue Basse-Normandie (1) 1987-88
- Coupe Basse-Normandie (5) 1964-65, 1980-81, 1989-90, 2004-05, 2005-06

== Notable players ==
- (France) Stéphane Lemarchand
