= MOS Caen =

- Full name: Maladrerie Omnisports Caen
- Founded: 1965
- Ground: Stade Joseph Déterville
- Capacity: 2,000
- Chairman: Thierry Deslandes
- Manager: David Caillard
- League: Régional 1
Home colours

Maladrerie Omnisports Caen is a French football club based in Caen. They are currently playing at the Régional 1 level.

== History ==
The club was founded on April 29th, 1965. The club spent 37 seasons in the departmental and regional leagues, until the end of the 2002-03 season when they finished second in the Division d'honneur Basse Normandie league and won promotion to the 5th tier of the French football league system. They only spent one season in the CFA2 before being relegated back to the Regional leagues, where they have remained since.

== Ground ==
The club play their home games at the Stade Joseph Déterville. The club have played at the stadium since 1965.

The stadium has a capacity of 2,000 with a stand containing 200 seats.

== Honours ==
- Coupe Basse-Normandie (1) 1994-95

== Notable players ==
- (France) Thomas Bosmel
- (Haiti) Jean-Jacques Pierre
- (France) Thibault Moulin

== Notable Managers ==
- (England) *Bobby Brown
