= Le Havre CS =

- Full name: Le Havre Caucriauville Sportif
- Nickname: Caucri
- Founded: 1963
- Ground: Stade Jules Ladoumegue
- Capacity: 5,280
- Chairman: Nouredine Moumen
- Manager: Kalidou Thioubou
- League: Régional 1
Home colours

Le Havre Caucriauville Sportif is a French football club based in Le Havre. They are currently playing at the Régional 1 level.

== History ==
The club began life in 1963 . The club played in the local, departmental and regional leagues until the end of the 2024-25 campaign, where upon winning the regional league were promoted to the Championnat National 3, the fifth tier of the French football league system. However they could only survive one season in the National 3 and were relegated back again to the Regional league.

== Honours ==
- Ligue Normandie Champions (1) 2024-25

== Ground ==
The club play their home games at the Stade Jules Ladoumegue.The stadium is a multisports complex, used for both football and athletics. The stadium has a capicty of 5280.

== Notable Players ==
- (Martinique) (Réunion) Alex Augustine
- (Democratic Republic of the Congo) Christian Kinkela
