= AL Deville-Maromme =

- Full name: Amicale Laïque Déville Maromme
- Founded: 1962
- Ground: Stade Paul Vauquelin
- Capacity: 1,500
- Chairman: Félix Baud
- Manager: Mohammed Diakhaby
- League: Régional 2
Home colours

Amicale Laïque Déville Maromme is a French football club based in Maromme. They are currently playing at the Régional 2 level.

== History ==
The club began life in 1962, after the merger of the football sections of the secular associations of Déville and Maromme. The club played in the local, departmental and regional leagues until the end of the 2017-18 campaign, where they won the Regional league and were promoted to the Championnat National 3, the fifth tier of the French football league system. However they could only survive one season in the National 3 and were relegated back again to the Regional leagues, where they have remained since.

== Ground ==
The club play their home games at the Stade Paul Vauquelin. The stadium was named after Paul Vauquelin, a former mayor of the commune and Freedom fighter in the second world war. The stadium has a capacity of 1,500, and features a 300 seater stand.

== Honours ==
- Ligue Normandie champion (1) 2017-18

== Notable Players ==
- (Ivory Coast) Kader N'Chobi
- (Republic of the Congo) Fred Dembi
