= Football Club Argentan =

- Full name: Football Club Argentan
- Founded: 1991
- Ground: Stade Gérard Saint
- Chairman: Hubert Bayer
- Manager: Yoann Neris
- League: Regional 3 – Normandy
Home colours

Football Club Argentan is a French football club based in Argentan.

== History ==
The club was formed in 1991 as a merger between Olympique Argentan and Union Sportive Métalos Argentan. The club was then called UFC Argentan. The newly merged club found success two seasons later when they won the Lower Normandy league in the 1992–93 season and won promotion to the Championnat National 3. They stayed at this level for 9 years before being relegated back to the regional leagues where they have remained since.

In 2011 season the club merged with Argentan FC to form one club in Argentan, FC Argentan.

== Ground ==
The club play their home games at the Stade Gérard Saint. The stadium was built in 1952 and is named after local professional road bicycle racer, Gérard Saint who died in a car accident in 1960 within a year of winning the Combativity award of the 1959 Tour de France. The stadium has had a new stand constructed in 2022 that holds 263 supporters.

== Honours ==
- Lower Normandy Regional 1 Champions (1) 1992-93
- Lower Normandy Regional 2 Champions (1) 2018-19

== Notable players ==
- (Senegal) Ngore Sarr
- (France) Sami Gtari

== Notable Former Managers ==
- (France) Jean-Luc Fugaldi (1979–81) - UFCP Argentan
- (England) Bobby Brown (1983–88) - US Argentan
- (France) Jean-Louis Coustillet (1994–01)
- (France) Roger Géri
