= ES Coutances =

- Full name: Entente Sportive Coutançaise
- Founded: 1961
- Ground: stade Paul-Maundrell
- Capacity: 2,000
- Chairman: Jean-Manuel Cousin and Jean-Michel Leroy
- Manager: Mickaël Derouet
- League: Régional 1
Home colours

ES Coutances is a French football club based in Coutances. They are currently playing at the Régional 1 level.

== History ==
The club was formed in 1961 as a merger of two clubs la Jeanne d’Arc de Coutances et le Club Sportif Coutançais. The club played in the various regional levels, up until 1996, after winning the Division d'Honneur basse Normandie for the 1995-96 season, and gaining promotion to the Championnat National 3. The club spent two seasons at the 5th tier of football in France before being relegated back to the Regional leagues, where it has remained since.

== Ground ==
The club play their home games at the Stade Paul-Maundrell.The stadium was named after former mayor of Coutances Paul-Maundrell, who was mayor between 1929 to 1941. The stadium has a capacity of 2,000 with a stand containing 350 seats.

== Honours ==
- DH Basse-Normandie (1) 1995-96
- Normandie Régional 2 group A (1) 2025-26

== Notable Managers ==
- (France) Michaël Barré
