= 2018–19 Coupe de France preliminary rounds, Normandy =

The 2018–19 Coupe de France preliminary rounds, Normandy was the qualifying competition to decide which teams from the leagues of the Normandy region of France took part in the main competition from the seventh round.

== First round ==
These matches were played on 18 and 19 August 2018.

First round results: Normandy
Tie no	Home team (tier)	Score	Away team (tier)
1.	FC Le-Val-St Père (10)	1–2	Patriote St Jamaise (8)
2.	ES Haylande (10)	2–4	AS Jullouville-Sartilly (8)
3.	ES Tirepied (11)	0–9	US St Martin-des-Champs (9)
4.	AS St Ovin (11)	0–10	US St Quentin-sur-le-Homme (8)
5.	Périers SF (9)	0–5	US St Pairaise (8)
6.	Claies de Vire FC (11)	2–4 (a.e.t.)	US Ste Croix St Lô (9)
7.	AS Folligny (11)	0–3 (Note: Tie won by forfeit.)	USM Donville (9)
8.	Tessy-Moyon Sports (9)	3–0 (Note: Créances SF penalised for playing a player not on the teamsheet. Tessy-Moyon Sports qualify.)	Créances SF (9)
9.	St Hilaire-Virey-Landelles (9)	0–2	USCO Sourdeval (8)
10.	ES Terregate-Beuvron-Juilley (10)	1–4	Espérance St Jean-des-Champs (8)
11.	FC Sienne (11)	0–2	ES Gouville-sur-Mer (9)
12.	Entente Le Lorey-Hautville-Feugères (11)	0–7	Condé Sports (8)
13.	US Vesly-Laulne (11)	1–2	La Bréhalaise FC (10)
14.	ES Munevillaise (11)	0–4	FC 3 Rivières (9)
15.	US Roncey-Cerisy (10)	0–1	ES Hébécrevon (9)
16.	US Lessay (11)	5–1	ES St Sauveur-La Ronde-Haye (10)
17.	AS Cerencaise (10)	2–1	US Percy (9)
18.	ES Marigny-Lozon-Mesnil-Vigot (10)	0–4	FC Agon-Coutainville (9)
19.	US Auvers-Baupte (11)	2–1	ES Isigny-sur-Mer (11)
20.	ES des Marais (10)	0–1	CA Pontois (9)
21.	RS St Sauverais (11)	0–2	US La Glacerie (9)
22.	AS St Jores (11)	1–5	AS Valognes (8)
23.	AS Pointe Cotentin (10)	2–0	AS Brix (9)
24.	FC Digosville (11)	2–7	AS Montebourg (10)
25.	FC Val de Saire (9)	1–2	US Côte-des-Isles (8)
26.	AS Négreville (10)	0–1	SM Haytillon (9)
27.	FC Bretteville-en-Saire (12)	0–1 (a.e.t.)	PL Octeville (9)
28.	SCU Douve Divette (8)	2–0	AS Querqueville (9)
29.	CS Barfleur (12)	0–2	ES Plain (8)
30.	AS Ste Marie-du-Mont (11)	0–12	Elan Tocqueville (8)
31.	CO Ceaucé (9)	3–4 (a.e.t.)	Leopards St Georges (8)
32.	JS Tinchebray (10)	1–3	SS Domfrontaise (8)
33.	AS Passais-St Fraimbault (9)	0–2	Avenir Messei (8)
34.	AM La Ferrière-aux-Etangs (9)	1–2	US Andaine (8)
35.	US Flerienne (9)	1–2	OC Briouze (8)
36.	AS Valburgeoise (10)	0–0 (3–4 p)	AS Gacé (9)
37.	ES Pays d'Ouche (10)	1–6	Amicale Chailloué (8)
38.	US Ménil-de-Briouze (11)	1–6	US Athis (9)
39.	US Putanges (11)	1–2	AS Sarceaux Espoir (9)
40.	ES Bellou-en-Houlme (11)	3–5	AS Boucé (10)
41.	SC Damigny (10)	1–3	FC Pays Aiglon (8)
42.	US Randonnai (9)	0–2	AS Berd'huis Foot (8)
43.	Sées FC (9)	0–6	Avenir St Germain-du-Corbéis (8)
44.	Soligny-Aspres-Moulins (9)	0–3	Espérance Condé-sur-Sarthe (8)
45.	Vedette de Boisthorel (11)	0–8	US Mortagnaise (8)
46.	CS Orbecquois-Vespèrois (9)	5–5 (6–5 p)	Vimoutiers FC (8)
47.	St Paul-du-Vernay FC (11)	0–8	AS Vaudry-Truttemer (9)
48.	Cambes-en-Plaine Sports (11)	1–3	JS Fleury-sur-Orne (9)
49.	AS Mathieu (11)	2–6	Lystrienne Sportive (9)
50.	AS Cahagnes (10)	1–3	ES Portaise (10)
51.	FC Caen Sud Ouest (11)	3–1	US Maisons (10)
52.	US Authie (11)	2–3 (a.e.t.)	ES Val de l'Orne (10)
53.	ES Carpiquet (9)	6–0 (Note: Tie switched at the request of both clubs.)	FC Mouen (11)
54.	FC Langrune-Luc (9)	4–2	FC Louvigny (10)
55.	Cresserons-Hermanville-Lion Terre et Mer (10)	4–0	NGS Ver-sur-Mer (12)
56.	ASL Chemin Vert (11)	0–3 (Note: ASL Chemin Vert penalised for unknown reason after result challenged. Cingal FC qualify.)	Cingal FC (8)
57.	ESI May-sur-Orne (9)	2–1	US Aunay-sur-Odon (8)
58.	ES Tronquay (10)	0–2	ES Thury-Harcourt (8)
59.	US Tilly-sur-Seulles (10)	1–1 (4–5 p)	US Cheux-St Manvieu-Norrey (9)
60.	US Trévières (11)	0–4	USI Bessin Nord (8)
61.	Inter Odon FC (9)	3–5	FC Hastings Rots (11)
62.	Stade St Sauverais (9)	1–1 (4–5 p)	SC Thiberville (8)
63.	MSL Garcelles-Secqueville (10)	5–1	AC Démouville-Cuverville (9)
64.	USM Blainvillaise (10)	1–4	ESFC Falaise (8)
65.	ES Bonnebosq (11)	1–10	AS Villers Houlgate Côte Fleurie (8)
66.	AS Biéville-Beuville (10)	1–3	US Guérinière (8)
67.	CL Colombellois (10)	1–0	Dozulé FC (10)
68.	AS Giberville (10)	0–2	FC Baie de l'Orne (8)
69.	US Villerville (10)	1–2	JS Colleville (8)
70.	FC Cagny (12)	0–18	US Pont-l'Évêque (8)
71.	ES Livarotaise (9)	2–1	CS Honfleur (8)
72.	AS St Désir (10)	3–0	US Viettoise (12)
73.	FC Moyaux (9)	3–2	AS St Cyr-Fervaques (8)
74.	FCO Grosley-sur-Risle (12)	1–3	CS Beaumont-le-Roger (9)
75.	Louviers FC (12)	1–8	FC Serquigny-Nassandres (9)
76.	CS Lyonsais (12)	1–2	Lusitanos JA Navarre (9)
77.	Fusion Charentonne St Aubin (11)	1–2	FC Brionne (10)
78.	US Cormeilles-Lieurey (11)	0–5	SC Bernay (9)
79.	AS Routot (9)	4–2	ASC Igoville (11)
80.	AS Fidelaire-Ferrière (11)	0–3	FC Val de Risle (9)
81.	FC Roumois Nord (10)	0–2	AS Val-de-Reuil/Vaudreuil/Poses (8)
82.	AS Courcelles (10)	0–3	FC Seine-Eure (8)
83.	AL St Michel Évreux (10)	3–6	FC Eure Madrie Seine (8)
84.	La Croix Vallée d'Eure (10)	3–2	FC Illiers-l'Évêque (8)
85.	CS Andelys (8)	4–1	AS Andrésienne (10)
86.	US St Germain-la-Campagne (10)	0–5	US Conches (8)
87.	FA Roumois (10)	0–2	ES Vallée de l'Oison (8)
88.	FCI Bel Air (10)	2–0	US Vatteville Brotonne (10)
89.	Stade Vernolien (10)	0–3	US Rugles (8)
90.	ES Damville (10)	0–3	St Sébastien Foot (8)
91.	SC Breteuil-Francheville (9)	2–1	FAC Alizay (8)
92.	AS Sassetot-Thérouldeville (9)	1–5	Stade Valeriquais (8)
93.	US Doudeville (9)	1–0	AS Ouvillaise (8)
94.	St Riquier GASEG (11)	1–4	AS Ourville (8)
95.	RC Étalondes (10)	0–5	Neuville AC (8)
96.	FC Béthune Meulers (10)	0–7	FC Neufchâtel (8)
97.	ES Aumaloise (9)	0–5	AS Mesnières-en-Bray (8)
98.	US Normande 76 (9)	3–2	AS Tréport (8)
99.	AS St Pierre-de-Varengeville (10)	1–4	FC Le Trait-Duclair (8)
100.	US des Vallées (10)	3–2	FC Fréville-Bouville SIVOM (8)
101.	ES Janval (10)	1–3	ES Arques (8)
102.	US Ste Marie-des-Champs (9)	2–4	AS St Pierre-en-Port (10)
103.	FC Petit Caux (10)	6–0	Belleville FC (11)
104.	FC Hattenville Coeur de Caux (11)	2–1	Entente Motteville/Croix-Mare (9)
105.	US Londinières (10)	2–1	US Grèges (9)
106.	Yerville FC (9)	0–0 (2–4 p)	Amicale Joseph Caulle (9)
107.	Entente Vienne et Saâne (9)	0–1	FC Tôtes (9)
108.	GS Foucarmont-Réalcamp (11)	0–7	CA Longuevillais (9)
109.	US Auffay (9)	1–4	US Bacqueville-Pierreville (9)
110.	AS Vallée du Dun (11)	2–4	US Héricourt (10)
111.	US Crielloise (10)	4–0	US Envermeu (10)
112.	FC Barentinois (9)	2–0	Boucle de Seine (9)
113.	AS St Vigor-d'Ymonville (10)	3–1	ESI St Antoine (8)
114.	AS La Frénaye (9)	1–6	AS Ste Addresse But (8)
115.	AS Petiville (10)	0–2	RC Havrais (9)
116.	FC Gruchet-le-Valasse (9)	0–2	US Épouville (8)
117.	AS Lanquetot (11)	0–3	Gainneville AC (8)
118.	Le Havre FC 2012 (9)	1–3	'US Cap de Caux (8)
119.	US Godervillais (9)	1–4	Athleti'Caux FC (9)
120.	AL Tourville-la-Rivière (10)	3–4	Stade Grande Quevilly (8)
121.	FC St Julien Petit Quevilly (9)	3–0	Mont-St-Aignan FC (8)
122.	AS Canton d'Argueil (10)	2–1	Amicale Houlmoise Bondevillaise FC (8)
123.	FC Nord Ouest (11)	1–4	US Grammont (8)
124.	FC St Étienne-du-Rouvray (8)	0–2	US St Jacques-sur-Darnétal (10)
125.	AS Buchy (9)	2–6	ASC Jiyan Kurdistan (8)
126.	AC Bray Est (9)	2–1	Grand-Couronne FC (8)
127.	Vieux-Manoir FC (11)	3–2	Amicale Malaunay (10)
128.	AS La Bouille-Moulineaux (10)	3–5 (a.e.t.)	Olympique Darnétal (9)
129.	ASPTT Rouen (10)	1–13	CS Gravenchon (8)

== Second round ==
These matches were played on 24, 25 and 26 August 2018.

Second round results: Normandy
Tie no	Home team (tier)	Score	Away team (tier)
1.	AS Jullouville-Sartilly (8)	1–2	Condé Sports (8)
2.	FC Équeurdreville-Hainneville (7)	1–0	US Ouest Cotentin (7)
3.	FC Tôtes (9)	2–0	Cany FC (8)
4.	AS Cerencaise (10)	0–2	Tessy-Moyon Sports (9)
5.	US St Pairaise (8)	0–2	US Ducey (6)
6.	AS Villers Houlgate Côte Fleurie (8)	6–1	SC Hérouvillais (8)
7.	US Auvers-Baupte (11)	0–5	UC Bricquebec (8)
8.	US Lessay (11)	1–2	US Côte-des-Isles (8)
9.	AS Pointe Cotentin (10)	3–6	SCU Douve Divette (8)
10.	La Bréhalaise FC (10)	1–2	USM Donville (9)
11.	AS Montebourg (10)	3–1	US La Glacerie (9)
12.	CA Pontois (9)	1–2	ES Plain (8)
13.	FC 3 Rivières (9)	0–2	FC Agon-Coutainville (9)
14.	US Ste Croix St Lô (9)	2–3	ES Coutances (7)
15.	US St Martin-des-Champs (9)	1–3	AS Brécey (8)
16.	ES Hébécrevon (9)	0–3	AS Tourlaville (6)
17.	ES Gouville-sur-Mer (9)	2–1	AS Valognes (8)
18.	SM Haytillon (9)	2–5 (a.e.t.)	Agneaux FC (7)
19.	PL Octeville (9)	4–1 (a.e.t.)	Elan Tocqueville (8)
20.	US St Quentin-sur-le-Homme (8)	2–1 (a.e.t.)	CS Villedieu (7)
21.	FC des Etangs (8)	0–1	Espérance St Jean-des-Champs (8)
22.	Patriote St Jamaise (8)	0–3	USCO Sourdeval (8)
23.	ES Pointe Hague (6)	0–1	CS Carentan (7)
24.	FC Caen Sud Ouest (11)	1–0	Réveil St Germain Courseulles-sur-Mer (7)
25.	CL Colombellois (10)	1–3 (a.e.t.)	AJS Ouistreham (7)
26.	AS Potigny-Villers-Canivet-Ussy (7)	3–1	Muance FC (7)
27.	USI Bessin Nord (8)	1–2 (a.e.t.)	AS Ifs (7)
28.	AS Verson (7)	7–1	FC Hastings Rots (11)
29.	AS St Vigor-le-Grand (8)	0–6	AF Virois (6)
30.	ES Livarotaise (9)	0–2	AG Caennaise (6)
31.	US Cheux-St Manvieu-Norrey (9)	1–0	Cingal FC (8)
32.	ESFC Falaise (8)	7–0	FC Moyaux (9)
33.	AS St Désir (10)	3–4	LC Bretteville-sur-Odon (6)
34.	ES Portaise (10)	0–4	Maladrerie OS (6)
35.	CS Orbecquois-Vespèrois (9)	1–6	SU Dives-Cabourg (6)
36.	US Pont-l'Évêque (8)	3–1 (a.e.t.)	JS Douvres (6)
37.	MSL Garcelles-Secqueville (10)	0–2	USON Mondeville (6)
38.	FC Baie de l'Orne (8)	1–2	FC Troarn (8)
39.	CA Lisieux (7)	1–3 (a.e.t.)	USC Mézidon (7)
40.	FC Thaon-Bretteville-Le Fresne (8)	0–2	Bourguébus-Soliers FC (7)
41.	ES Val de l'Orne (10)	0–3	ES Carpiquet (9)
42.	ES Thury-Harcourt (8)	3–1	FC Langrune-Luc (9)
43.	AS Vaudry-Truttemer (9)	2–1	US Villers-Bocage (7)
44.	JS Fleury-sur-Orne (9)	2–1	Cresserons-Hermanville-Lion Terre et Mer (10)
45.	Lystrienne Sportive (9)	0–2	US Guérinière (8)
46.	JS Colleville (8)	2–3 (a.e.t.)	ESI May-sur-Orne (9)
47.	AS Berd'huis Foot (8)	0–4	Jeunesse Fertoise Bagnoles (7)
48.	OC Briouze (8)	2–3	FC Pays Aiglon (8)
49.	AS Sarceaux Espoir (9)	1–3	AS Courteille Alençon (8)
50.	AS Gacé (9)	1–7	AS La Selle-la-Forge (8)
51.	Avenir Messei (8)	3–1	Avenir St Germain-du-Corbéis (8)
52.	US Mortagnaise (8)	3–2	Leopards St Georges (8)
53.	SS Domfrontaise (8)	0–7	FC Flers (6)
54.	AS Boucé (10)	1–4	Espérance Condé-sur-Sarthe (8)
55.	US Athis (9)	3–1	US Andaine (8)
56.	Amicale Chailloué (8)	1–3	FC Argentan (7)
57.	Stade Valeriquais (8)	2–0 (a.e.t.)	US Doudeville (9)
58.	US Héricourt (10)	2–1 (a.e.t.)	US des Vallées (10)
59.	AS Ourville (8)	3–0	FC Barentinois (9)
60.	FC Petit Caux (10)	0–4	Olympique Pavillais (7)
61.	ES Arques (8)	0–3	JS St Nicolas-d'Aliermont (7)
62.	FC Hattenville Coeur de Caux (11)	0–9	Yvetot AC (6)
63.	US Londinières (10)	0–7	AS Plateau (8)
64.	FC Neufchâtel (8)	0–1	ES Tourville (7)
65.	CA Longuevillais (9)	1–2	FC Offranville (8)
66.	Amicale Joseph Caulle (9)	1–2	AS Fauvillaise (7)
67.	US Crielloise (10)	0–2	AS Mesnières-en-Bray (8)
68.	US Normande 76 (9)	1–2	Neuville AC (8)
69.	US Bacqueville-Pierreville (9)	0–5	US Luneraysienne (7)
70.	Athleti'Caux FC (9)	7–2	AS Ste Addresse But (8)
71.	AS St Pierre-en-Port (10)	1–4	USF Fécamp (7)
72.	RC Havrais (9)	1–4	SC Frileuse (6)
73.	AS St Vigor-d'Ymonville (10)	1–3	St Romain AC (6)
74.	US Épouville (8)	0–2 (a.e.t.)	CSSM Le Havre (6)
75.	CS Gravenchon (8)	2–9	US Bolbec (7)
76.	SC Octevillais (7)	4–2 (a.e.t.)	Havre Caucriauville Sportif (8)
77.	Gainneville AC (8)	2–1	Olympique Havrais Tréfileries-Neiges (7)
78.	US Cap de Caux (8)	2–2 (4–3 p)	AS Montivilliers (7)
79.	US Lillebonne (7)	1–3	ES Mont-Gaillard (8)
80.	ASC Jiyan Kurdistan (8)	0–2	Grand-Quevilly FC (6)
81.	FC Bonsecours-St Léger (7)	0–2	US St Jacques-sur-Darnétal (10)
82.	RC Caudebecais (7)	2–1	FUSC Bois-Guillaume (6)
83.	Stade Grande Quevilly (8)	3–5	Stade Sottevillais CC (6)
84.	AS Canton d'Argueil (10)	0–2	GCO Bihorel (7)
85.	AC Bray Est (9)	0–3	Rouen Sapins FC Grand-Mare (7)
86.	US Grammont (8)	0–3 (a.e.t.)	FC St Julien Petit Quevilly (9)
87.	Vieux-Manoir FC (11)	0–4	AS Gournay-en-Bray (8)
88.	US Mesnil-Esnard/Franqueville (7)	3–1	AS Madrillet Château Blanc (6)
89.	FC Le Trait-Duclair (8)	2–0	CO Cléon (8)
90.	SS Gournay (9)	2–2 (3–4 p)	AS Trouville-Deauville (6)
91.	Olympique Darnétal (9)	2–1	St Aubin FC (7)
92.	CS Beaumont-le-Roger (9)	1–4	US Gasny (7)
93.	SC Thiberville (8)	1–2	SC Bernay (9)
94.	SC Breteuil-Francheville (9)	1–2	St Sébastien Foot (8)
95.	FC Brionne (10)	4–4 (1–3 p)	ES Normanville (8)
96.	Lusitanos JA Navarre (9)	3–4	US Rugles (8)
97.	La Croix Vallée d'Eure (10)	1–0	FC Eure Madrie Seine (8)
98.	FC Val de Risle (9)	1–3	US Conches (8)
99.	CA Pont-Audemer (8)	2–1 (a.e.t.)	AS Routot (9)
100.	FC Serquigny-Nassandres (9)	1–0 (a.e.t.)	ES Vallée de l'Oison (8)
101.	FCI Bel Air (10)	0–2	FC Seine-Eure (8)
102.	AS Val-de-Reuil/Vaudreuil/Poses (8)	0–1	Romilly/Pont-St Pierre FC (6)
103.	FC Epégard-Le Neubourg (8)	2–2 (6–7 p)	Saint Marcel Foot (7)
104.	CS Andelys (8)	2–2 (3–4 p)	Stade Porte Normande Vernon (7)
105.	Club Andelle Pîtres (8)	0–2	FC Gisors Vexin Normand (7)

== Third round ==
These matches were played on 15, 16, 22 and 23 September 2018, with one replay on 30 September 2018.

Third round results: Normandy
Tie no	Home team (tier)	Score	Away team (tier)
1.	AS Vaudry-Truttemer (9)	0–3	Jeunesse Fertoise Bagnoles (7)
2.	AS Ifs (7)	1–2	USON Mondeville (6)
3.	US Mesnil-Esnard/Franqueville (7)	1–5	FC Rouen (5)
4.	FC Argentan (7)	2–1	ESFC Falaise (8)
5.	AS Villers Houlgate Côte Fleurie (8)	3–1	ASPTT Caen (5)
6.	US Conches (8)	2–3	AL Déville-Maromme (5)
7.	US Rugles (8)	1–2	Pacy Ménilles RC (5)
8.	St Sébastien Foot (8)	4–1	Rouen Sapins FC Grand-Mare (7)
9.	ES Normanville (8)	2–1	GCO Bihorel (7)
10.	FC Seine-Eure (8)	1–2	Grand-Quevilly FC (6)
11.	SC Bernay (9)	0–4	Saint Marcel Foot (7)
12.	US St Jacques-sur-Darnétal (10)	2–5	US Gasny (7)
13.	FC St Julien Petit Quevilly (9)	2–3	RC Caudebecais (7)
14.	La Croix Vallée d'Eure (10)	2–0	CA Pont-Audemer (8)
15.	AS Gournay-en-Bray (8)	2–3	Évreux FC 27 (5)
16.	US Héricourt (10)	0–0 (3–0 p)	AS Fauvillaise (7)
17.	St Romain AC (6)	1–3	SC Octevillais (7)
18.	FC Offranville (8)	3–2	US Luneraysienne (7)
19.	ES Tourville (7)	4–0	AS Ourville (8)
20.	AS Mesnières-en-Bray (8)	1–1 (1–4 p)	Stade Valeriquais (8)
21.	FC Tôtes (9)	1–3	Olympique Pavillais (7)
22.	US Bolbec (7)	5–1	Gainneville AC (8)
23.	Athleti'Caux FC (9)	1–2	SC Frileuse (6)
24.	USF Fécamp (7)	1–2	AS Trouville-Deauville (6)
25.	Neuville AC (8)	2–8	Yvetot AC (6)
26.	US Cap de Caux (8)	1–2 (Note: Result was challenged by US Cap de Caux due to the referee allowing two players from CSSSM Le Havre to return to the field after being substituted. The original challenge was dismissed, because it was only placed after the second player returned to the field. However, US Cap de Caux appealed, and the appeal committee ruled that the game should be replayed. The replay ended with the same scoreline as the original fixture, 1–2.)	CSSM Le Havre (6)
27.	JS St Nicolas-d'Aliermont (7)	2–4	FC Le Trait-Duclair (8)
28.	Olympique Darnétal (9)	1–0	Stade Porte Normande Vernon (7)
29.	FC Serquigny-Nassandres (9)	1–0	Romilly/Pont-St Pierre FC (6)
30.	FC Gisors Vexin Normand (7)	3–5	Stade Sottevillais CC (6)
31.	US Athis (9)	1–2	US Ducey (6)
32.	US Côte-des-Isles (8)	1–7	AS Tourlaville (6)
33.	ES Plain (8)	1–0	FC Équeurdreville-Hainneville (7)
34.	ES Gouville-sur-Mer (9)	1–3	CS Carentan (7)
35.	PL Octeville (9)	0–1 (a.e.t.)	Agneaux FC (7)
36.	FC Agon-Coutainville (9)	1–3	ES Coutances (7)
37.	AS Montebourg (10)	0–8	SCU Douve Divette (8)
38.	Espérance St Jean-des-Champs (8)	2–0 (a.e.t.)	US St Quentin-sur-le-Homme (8)
39.	USM Donville (9)	1–3	USCO Sourdeval (8)
40.	Tessy-Moyon Sports (9)	2–1 (a.e.t.)	AS Brécey (8)
41.	Espérance Condé-sur-Sarthe (8)	3–1	FC Pays Aiglon (8)
42.	AS Courteille Alençon (8)	0–1	US Mortagnaise (8)
43.	AS Potigny-Villers-Canivet-Ussy (7)	0–1	AS Verson (7)
44.	US Guérinière (8)	0–8	AG Caennaise (6)
45.	ESI May-sur-Orne (9)	2–4 (a.e.t.)	USC Mézidon (7)
46.	Condé Sports (8)	0–3	AS Cherbourg Football (5)
47.	JS Fleury-sur-Orne (9)	3–1	LC Bretteville-sur-Odon (6)
48.	Bourguébus-Soliers FC (7)	2–0	Bayeux FC (5)
49.	ES Carpiquet (9)	2–2 (3–4 p)	FC Troarn (8)
50.	FC Caen Sud Ouest (11)	0–7	Maladrerie OS (6)
51.	US Cheux-St Manvieu-Norrey (9)	1–3	AJS Ouistreham (7)
52.	ES Thury-Harcourt (8)	1–3	FC Flers (6)
53.	AS Plateau (8)	1–4	FC Dieppe (5)
54.	US Pont-l'Évêque (8)	1–0	SU Dives-Cabourg (6)
55.	Avenir Messei (8)	0–8	AF Virois (6)
56.	AS La Selle-la-Forge (8)	2–3	US Alençon (5)
57.	UC Bricquebec (8)	2–4	FC Saint-Lô Manche (5)
58.	ES Mont-Gaillard (8)	1–0	ESM Gonfreville (5)

== Fourth round ==
These matches were played on 29 and 30 September 2018, with one tie re-arranged for 7 October 2018.

Fourth round results: Normandy
Tie no	Home team (tier)	Score	Away team (tier)
1.	ES Plain (8)	2–3	US Pont-l'Évêque (8)
2.	FC Troarn (8)	1–2	AS Villers Houlgate Côte Fleurie (8)
3.	JS Fleury-sur-Orne (9)	0–2	AJS Ouistreham (7)
4.	Maladrerie OS (6)	2–0	AS Tourlaville (6)
5.	AS Verson (7)	1–2	Agneaux FC (7)
6.	AS Trouville-Deauville (6)	1–4	AG Caennaise (6)
7.	SCU Douve Divette (8)	3–4 (a.e.t.)	AS Cherbourg Football (5)
8.	CS Carentan (7)	2–3	FC Saint-Lô Manche (5)
9.	US Ducey (6)	1–2	Jeunesse Fertoise Bagnoles (7)
10.	Espérance Condé-sur-Sarthe (8)	3–4	FC Argentan (7)
11.	USC Mézidon (7)	1–1 (6–5 p)	Espérance St Jean-des-Champs (8)
12.	FC Flers (6)	2–2 (1–3 p)	Bourguébus-Soliers FC (7)
13.	USCO Sourdeval (8)	0–2	AF Virois (6)
14.	Tessy-Moyon Sports (9)	2–1	ES Coutances (7)
15.	US Mortagnaise (8)	0–1	USON Mondeville (6)
16.	US Alençon (5)	0–2	US Granville (4)
17.	US Héricourt (10)	0–6	US Bolbec (7)
18.	Olympique Pavillais (7)	2–2 (4–2 p)	ES Tourville (7)
19.	Stade Valeriquais (8)	1–2	Yvetot AC (6)
20.	AL Déville-Maromme (5)	6–0	SC Frileuse (6)
21.	ES Mont-Gaillard (8)	1–2 (a.e.t.)	FC Dieppe (5)
22.	FC Rouen (5)	2–0 (a.e.t.)	CSSM Le Havre (6)
23.	PL Octeville (9)	2–1	FC Offranville (8)
24.	Saint Marcel Foot (7)	0–1	Évreux FC 27 (5)
25.	US Gasny (7)	0–2	St Sébastien Foot (8)
26.	La Croix Vallée d'Eure (10)	0–2	FC Le Trait-Duclair (8)
27.	Olympique Darnétal (9)	1–8	CMS Oissel (4)
28.	Pacy Ménilles RC (5)	3–2	Stade Sottevillais CC (6)
29.	FC Serquigny-Nassandres (9)	0–1	RC Caudebecais (7)
30.	ES Normanville (8)	2–4 (a.e.t.)	Grand-Quevilly FC (6)

== Fifth round ==
These matches were played on 13 and 14 October 2018.

Fifth round results: Normandy
Tie no	Home team (tier)	Score	Away team (tier)
1.	AF Virois (6)	2–4 (a.e.t.)	USON Mondeville (6)
2.	Agneaux FC (7)	1–4	US Granville (4)
3.	Jeunesse Fertoise Bagnoles (7)	0–4	US Avranches (3)
4.	USC Mézidon (7)	3–4	AS Cherbourg Football (5)
5.	AG Caennaise (6)	3–2	Maladrerie OS (6)
6.	Tessy-Moyon Sports (9)	2–3	AJS Ouistreham (7)
7.	US Pont-l'Évêque (8)	0–7	FC Saint-Lô Manche (5)
8.	Bourguébus-Soliers FC (7)	1–0 (a.e.t.)	FC Argentan (7)
9.	Yvetot AC (6)	1–2	US Quevilly-Rouen (3)
10.	RC Caudebecais (7)	0–4	CMS Oissel (4)
11.	Pacy Ménilles RC (5)	0–4	FC Rouen (5)
12.	US Bolbec (7)	1–2	Évreux FC 27 (5)
13.	AS Villers Houlgate Côte Fleurie (8)	4–0	St Sébastien Foot (8)
14.	FC Le Trait-Duclair (8)	0–1	FC Dieppe (5)
15.	Olympique Pavillais (7)	0–1	AL Déville-Maromme (5)
16.	Grand-Quevilly FC (6)	5–0 (Note: Tie switched with the agreement of both clubs.)	PL Octeville (9)

== Sixth round ==
These matches were played on 27 and 28 October 2018.

Sixth round results: Normandy
Tie no	Home team (tier)	Score	Away team (tier)
1.	FC Rouen (5)	0–1	USON Mondeville (6)
2.	US Avranches (3)	1–0	US Granville (4)
3.	CMS Oissel (4)	1–0	US Quevilly-Rouen (3)
4.	Bourguébus-Soliers FC (7)	1–2	Grand-Quevilly FC (6)
5.	AL Déville-Maromme (5)	1–3	AG Caennaise (6)
6.	AS Cherbourg Football (5)	0–0 (4–3 p)	FC Dieppe (5)
7.	AJS Ouistreham (7)	2–2 (2–4 p)	AS Villers Houlgate Côte Fleurie (8)
8.	Évreux FC 27 (5)	1–2	FC Saint-Lô Manche (5)
