= 2021–22 Coupe de France preliminary rounds, Normandy =

The 2021–22 Coupe de France preliminary rounds, Normandy was the qualifying competition to decide which teams from the leagues of the Normandy region of France took part in the main competition from the seventh round.

A total of eight teams qualified from the Normandy preliminary rounds. In 2020–21, US Quevilly-Rouen progressed furthest in the main competition, reaching the round of 64 before losing to Red Star.

== Draws and fixtures ==
On 15 July 2021, the league declared a total of 394 teams from the region entered the competition, with 318 entering at the first round stage and 59 at the second round stage. Eleven Championnat National 3 teams entered at the third round, two Championnat National 2 teams entered at the fourth round and one Championnat National team entered at the fifth round.

The first round draw was also published on 15 July 2021. The second round draw was published on 24 August 2021. The third round draw took place live on 6 September 2021. The fourth round draw took place on 23 September 2021. The fifth round draw was made on 7 October 2021. The sixth round draw was made on 21 October 2021.

=== First round ===
These matches were played on 22 August 2021. Tiers marked (*) are outside of the district pyramid.

First round results: Normandy
Tie no	Home team (tier)	Score	Away team (tier)
1.	US Saint-Martin Saint-Jean-de-la Haize (9)	3–0	ES Terregate-Beuvron-Juilley (10)
2.	US Gavray (11)	1–2	AS Cerencaise (11)
3.	US Pontorson (11)	5–0	ES Trelly Quettreville Contrières (11)
4.	CS Villedieu (8)	3–3 (4–5 p)	AS Brécey (9)
5.	US Percy (9)	4–0	USM Donville (9)
6.	SM Haytillon (10)	2–1	AS Bérigny-Cerisy (11)
7.	US Sainte-Cécile (11)	2–1	AS Jullouville-Sartilly (8)
8.	ES Tirepied (10)	0–1	Tessy-Moyon Sports (8)
9.	USCO Sourdeval (8)	2–1	Saint-Hilaire-Virey-Landelles (8)
10.	La Bréhalaise FC (9)	1–3	FC du Thar (9)
11.	US Semille-Saint-André (12)	0–4	ES Gouville-sur-Mer (9)
12.	FC Agon-Coutainville (8)	1–1 (4–5 p)	ES Saint-Sauveur-La Ronde-Haye (9)
13.	ES des Marais (10)	0–2	Condé Sports (8)
14.	FC Sienne (11)	2–0	FC 3 Rivières (8)
15.	FC Saint-Jean-de-Daye (12)	7–3	ES Munevillaise (10)
16.	FC de l'Elle (9)	1–4	FC des Etangs (8)
17.	Entente Le Lorey-Hauteville-Feugères (11)	0–3	US Lessay (10)
18.	AS Vesly (11)	2–4	CA Pontois (9)
19.	Périers SF (10)	1–0	AS Guilberville (11)
20.	Jeunesse Cenillaise (10)	1–3	AS Thèreval (9)
21.	AS Pointe Cotentin (9)	0–3	US Vasteville-Acqueville (10)
22.	ÉR Mesnil-au-Val (12)	1–5	AS Valognes (8)
23.	CS Barfleur (12)	1–1 (4–3 p)	Bricqueboscq-Saint-Christophe-Grosville Sport (12)
24.	ASS Urville-Nacqueville (11)	2–2 (4–2 p)	ES Quettetot-Rauville (11)
25.	US La Glacerie (10)	8–0	FC Bretteville-en-Saire (11)
26.	AS Querqueville (9)	2–3	UC Bricquebec (8)
27.	AS Montebourg (11)	1–2	FC Digosville (10)
28.	FC Val de Saire (8)	2–0	PL Octeville (9)
29.	ES Héauville-Siouville (11)	1–6	ES Plain (9)
30.	Créances SF (8)	4–0	SCU Douve Divette (8)
31.	AS Sacey (11)	2–6	US Saint-Quentin-sur-le-Homme (9)
32.	Espérance Saint-Jean-des-Champs (8)	3–0 (Note: Tie won by means of forfeit.)	Patriote Saint-Jamaise (8)
33.	ES Pays d'Ouche (11)	0–3	US Mortagnaise (7)
34.	US Randonnai (9)	0–3	AS Sarceaux Espoir (9)
35.	US Mêloise (10)	3–0	Vimoutiers FC (8)
36.	AS Boucé (9)	1–2	Espérance Condé-sur-Sarthe (8)
37.	Sées FC (9)	1–4	AS Valburgeoise (9)
38.	SC Damigny (10)	0–14	FC Pays Aiglon (8)
39.	US Athis (8)	1–1 (4–3 p)	Leopards Saint-Georges (8)
40.	ES Écouves (9)	3–1	Avenir Saint-Germain-du-Corbéis (8)
41.	FC Putanges-le-Lac (10)	2–2 (2–4 p)	Amicale Chailloué (10)
42.	AS Berd'huis Foot (9)	2–2 (5–6 p)	FC Écouché (10)
43.	FL Ségrie-Fontaine (10)	0–3	SS Domfrontaise (8)
44.	AS Passais-Saint-Fraimbault (9)	2–3	Avenir Messei (8)
45.	US Flérienne (9)	3–3 (4–5 p)	AS Monts d'Andaine (9)
46.	JS Tinchebray (10)	2–1	FC Landais (10)
47.	CO Ceaucé (9)	3–6	AS La Selle-la-Forge (8)
48.	US Frênes-Montsecret (10)	2–1	OC Briouze (8)
49.	SL Petruvien (9)	2–7	US Andaine (8)
50.	Football Club Pays Bellêmois (12)	1–3	AS Gacé (9)
51.	FC Detente Chambois-Fel (10)	1–1 (9–8 p) (Note: FC Detente Chambois-Fel penalised for fielding an ineligible player. La Vedette du Boisthorel qualify.)	La Vedette du Boisthorel (11)
52.	AS Aubusson (11)	2–2 (5–6 p)	AM La Ferrière-aux-Etangs (9)
53.	CS Orbecquois-Vespèrois (9)	4–2	Soligny-Aspres-Moulins Football (10)
54.	MSL Garcelles-Secqueville (10)	1–1 (2–4 p)	CL Colombellois (9)
55.	FC Baventais (12)	1–2	Cresserons-Hermanville-Lion Terre et Mer (10)
56.	USM Blainvillaise (8)	1–0	CS Honfleur (8)
57.	Fontenay-le-Pesnel FC (12)	0–1	AF Basly (12)
58.	ES Portaise (9)	1–1 (4–5 p)	US Guérinière (9)
59.	AS Cahagnes (10)	0–2	USI Bessin Nord (8)
60.	ES Tronquay (11)	1–8	US Aunay-sur-Odon (8)
61.	Inter Odon FC (9)	4–0	AS Vaudry-Truttemer (8)
62.	US Pétruvienne (11)	2–0	AS La Hoguette (11)
63.	AC Démouville-Cuverville (10)	4–3	AS Saint-Cyr-Fervaques (9)
64.	US Viettoise (11)	0–2	Dozulé FC (9)
65.	ES Bonnebosq (11)	1–4	AS Saint-Désir (10)
66.	Muance FC (8)	0–1 (Note: Tie reversed from original draw.)	Stade Saint-Sauveurais (8)
67.	EF Touques-Saint-Gratien (11)	0–3	FC Caen Sud Ouest (10)
68.	AS Saint-Aignan-Langanneerie (11)	2–1	ES Sannerville-Touffréville (11)
69.	FC Mouen (11)	2–7	FC Baie de l'Orne (8)
70.	JS Audrieu (9)	6–0	AS Giberville (9)
71.	FC Moyaux (9)	1–7	AS Potigny-Villers-Canivet-Ussy (8)
72.	JS Fleury-sur-Orne (9)	0–1	FC Hastings Rots (9)
73.	Cingal FC (9)	1–1 (4–5 p)	FC Troarn (8)
74.	AS Biéville-Beuville (11)	2–2 (3–4 p)	ES Cormelles (10)
75.	ES Livarotaise (8)	0–1	Bourguébus-Soliers FC (7)
76.	AS Ouilly-le-Vicomte (10)	0–5	US Pont-l'Évêque (8)
77.	ES Courtonnaise (11)	1–7	AS Saint-Philbert-des-Champs (10)
78.	ASF Grentheville (12)	0–4	ES Carpiquet (8)
79.	US Trévières (9)	3–2	US Authie (10)
80.	Grainville-sur-Odon FC (12)	2–3	ES Saint Aubinaise (11)
81.	FM Condé-en-Normandie (10)	1–2	Réveil Saint-Germain Courseulles-sur-Mer (8)
82.	US Maisons (11)	3–0	ES Val de l'Orne (10)
83.	Inter Bocage FC (9)	0–9	ES Thury-Harcourt (8)
84.	UA Saint-Sever (10)	2–0	ESI May-sur-Orne (9)
85.	ASL Chemin Vert (10)	2–4	AS Saint-Vigor-le-Grand (8)
86.	Saint-Paul-du-Vernay FC (11)	0–3	FC Thaon-Bretteville-Le Fresne (8)
87.	Lystrienne Sportive (9)	0–9	US Villers-Bocage (8)
88.	AS Épaignes (12)	0–3	FA Roumois (9)
89.	US Barroise (12)	0–3	SC Bernay (8)
90.	FC Val de Risle (8)	0–3	FC Serquigny-Nassandres (8)
91.	US Cormeilles-Lieurey (10)	2–5	FC Pays du Neubourg (8)
92.	Stade Vernolien (10)	3–3 (2–4 p)	ES Vallée de l'Oison (8)
93.	US Saint-Germain-la-Campagne (11)	1–3	FCI Bel Air (9)
94.	FC Roumois Nord (9)	1–7	CS Beaumont-le-Roger (8)
95.	Beuzeville AC (11)	2–6	US Rugles-Lyre (8)
96.	Fusion Charentonne Saint-Aubin (10)	0–11	CA Pont-Audemer (8)
97.	AS La Croisille Saint-Élier Burey (12)	1–3	SC Thiberville (8)
98.	ES Angerville/Baux-Ste Croix/Plessis-Grohan/Ventes (10)	1–2	ES Normanville (8)
99.	AS Andréseinne (10)	1–4	FC Illiers-l'Évêque (8)
100.	FC Madrie (11)	2–4	FC Garennes-Bueil-La Couture-Breuilpont (8)
101.	AL Saint-Michel Évreux (10)	3–4	FAC Alizay (8)
102.	FC Hennezis Vexin Sud (11)	0–0 (5–4 p)	Club Andelle Pîtres (8)
103.	US Étrépagny (10)	0–3	FC Eure Madrie Seine (8)
104.	AS Ailly-Fontaine-Bellenger (10)	1–9	Saint Marcel Foot (7)
105.	RC Muids-Daubeuf-Vauvray (11)	0–1	US Gasny (9)
106.	ES Vexin Ouest (12)	2–1	AS Courcelles (9)
107.	Charleval FC (11)	4–2	FC Seine-Eure (8)
108.	La Croix Vallée d'Eure (10)	0–1	US Conches (8)
109.	AS Criquebeuf (10)	3–2	AS Routot (10)
110.	Olympique Darnétal (9)	1–1 (4–5 p)	Stade Grand Quevilly (8)
111.	FC Anneville-Manéhouville-Crosville (*)	2–5	Plateau de Quincampoix FC (8)
112.	AS Gournay-en-Bray (8)	0–1	AC Bray Est (8)
113.	ASPTT Rouen (10)	2–13	FC Saint-Étienne-du-Rouvray (8)
114.	US Saint-Jean-du-Cardonnay-Fresquiennes (10)	0–6	Mont-Saint-Aignan FC (8)
115.	US Forêt de Roumare (10)	3–0	FC Fréville-Bouville SIVOM (9)
116.	JS Serqueux-Saumont (11)	0–2	AS Canton d'Argueil (8)
117.	Rouen AC (11)	1–3	Amicale Malaunay (9)
118.	FC Criquiers (12)	1–14	Canteleu FC (12)
119.	AS Sassetot-Thérouldeville (9)	2–0	FC de la Varenne (10)
120.	AS Buchy (10)	7–1	Isneauville FC (*)
121.	US Londinières (10)	0–0 (6–5 p)	ASC Jiyan Kurdistan (9)
122.	Grand-Couronne FC (9)	0–3	Rouen Sapins FC Grand-Mare (7)
123.	FC Barentinois (9)	7–2	Entente Motteville/Croix-Mare (9)
124.	US Crielloise (10)	0–5	Entente Vienne et Saâne (8)
125.	US Doudeville (9)	4–2	Stade Valeriquais (8)
126.	US Envermeu (10)	2–5	FC Biville-la-Baignarde (11)
127.	ASM Barentin (*)	1–8	ES Montigny La Vaupalière (*)
128.	US Normande 76 (9)	1–1 (4–3 p)	ES Arques (8)
129.	AS Ouvillaise (9)	2–1	US Héricourt-en-Caux (10)
130.	ES Janval (9)	0–3	Eu FC (9)
131.	FC Petit Caux (10)	1–0	CA Longuevillais (9)
132.	US Auffay (9)	3–1	Yerville FC (10)
133.	FC Ventois (10)	0–2	FC Offranville (8)
134.	AS Vallée du Dun (10)	2–7	AS Ourville (8)
135.	FC Caux et Sauzens (10)	0–0 (3–4 p)	FC Tôtes (8)
136.	Belleville FC (10)	1–1 (3–4 p)	AJC Bosc-le-Hard (8)
137.	FC Limésy (11)	0–3	AS Tréport (8)
138.	AS Lanquetot (*)	0–8	GS Saint-Aubin Saint-Vigor (10)
139.	FC Épreville (10)	3–3 (4–3 p)	CA Harfleur Beaulieu (11)
140.	FC Bréauté-Bretteville (10)	3–4	US Sennevillaise (*)
141.	US Vatteville Brotonne (10)	1–2	CS Gravenchon (8)
142.	Olympique Belmesnil (10)	0–16	ES Plateau-Foucarmont-Réalcamp (8)
143.	Athleti'Caux FC (8)	3–2	AS Montivilliers (8)
144.	ESI Saint-Antoine (9)	1–6	US Lillebonne (8)
145.	RC Normand (11)	0–4	US Godervillais (8)
146.	US des Falaises (12)	4–0	JS Saint-Leonard (12)
147.	Manéglise FC (*)	1–3	ASL Ramponneau (12)
148.	JS Fontenay (11)	0–11	SS Gournay (8)
149.	AS Fauvillaise (8)	8–0	AS Sainte-Adresse But (10)
150.	FC Gruchet-le-Valasse (10)	1–1 (5–3 p)	US Épouville (8)
151.	RC Havrais (9)	5–1 (Note: RC Havrais penalised for fielding ineligible players. Gainneville AC qualify.)	Gainneville AC (8)
152.	Le Havre FC 2012 (9)	3–6	Le Havre Caucriauville Sportif (8)
153.	AS Saint-Pierre-de-Varengeville (9)	0–0 (7–8 p)	Neuville AC (8)
154.	US Bacqueville-Pierreville (10)	1–4	Cany FC (8)
155.	US Grèges (10)	1–5	JS Saint-Nicolas-d'Aliermont-Béthune (8)
156.	Boucle de Seine (9)	0–4	FC Saint-Julien Petit Quevilly (8)
157.	US Presqu'ile (12)	1–1 (5–4 p)	FC Nord Ouest (10)
158.	Vieux-Manoir FC (10)	3–1	US Saint-Jacques-sur-Darnétal (*)
159.	ES Aumaloise (9)	0–6	FC Neufchâtel (8)

=== Second round ===
These matches were played on 27 and 29 August 2021. Tiers marked (*) are outside of the district pyramid.

Second round results: Normandy
Tie no	Home team (tier)	Score	Away team (tier)
1.	SM Haytillon (10)	0–2	FC Équeurdreville-Hainneville (7)
2.	AS Valognes (8)	3–2	ES Pointe Hague (7)
3.	US Vasteville-Acqueville (10)	3–3 (4–3 p)	CS Carentan (7)
4.	ASS Urville-Nacqueville (11)	1–1 (4–5 p)	US Côte des Isles (7)
5.	FC Val de Saire (8)	0–3	AS Tourlaville (6)
6.	FC Digosville (10)	0–10	UC Bricquebec (8)
7.	CA Pont-Audemer (8)	0–2	ES Plain (9)
8.	US Lessay (10)	0–8	US Ouest Cotentin (7)
9.	CS Barfleur (12)	0–4	US La Glacerie (10)
10.	FC des Etangs (8)	1–1 (4–5 p)	Agneaux FC (7)
11.	ES Coutances (7)	1–2	US Saint-Pairaise (7)
12.	Tessy-Moyon Sports (8)	1–1 (4–1 p)	US Ducey-Isigny (6)
13.	US Percy (9)	5–0	Créances SF (8)
14.	AS Cerencaise (11)	1–1 (4–3 p)	Espérance Saint-Jean-des-Champs (8)
15.	AS Brécey (9)	0–1	AS Thèreval (9)
16.	FC Sienne (11)	5–0	US Saint-Martin Saint-Jean-de-la Haize (9)
17.	FC Saint-Jean-de-Daye (12)	0–7	ES Saint-Sauveur-La Ronde-Haye (9)
18.	US Saint-Quentin-sur-le-Homme (9)	2–1	USCO Sourdeval (8)
19.	US Pontorson (11)	1–2	Condé Sports (8)
20.	FC du Thar (9)	1–1 (6–7 p)	ES Gouville-sur-Mer (9)
21.	Périers SF (10)	4–1	US Sainte-Cécile (11)
22.	AS Valburgeoise (9)	0–7	FC Argentan (6)
23.	FC Écouché (10)	3–0	US Frênes-Montsecret (10)
24.	JS Tinchebray (10)	0–1	FC Pays Aiglon (8)
25.	La Vedette du Boisthorel (11)	0–1	AS Courteille Alençon (7)
26.	US Andaine (8)	2–2 (2–3 p)	US Athis (8)
27.	Amicale Chailloué (10)	0–2	US Mortagnaise (7)
28.	Avenir Messei (8)	1–4	Jeunesse Fertoise Bagnoles (7)
29.	AS Monts d'Andaine (9)	1–1 (2–3 p)	Espérance Condé-sur-Sarthe (8)
30.	AS Sarceaux Espoir (9)	3–0	AS Gacé (9)
31.	US Mêloise (10)	0–4	AS La Selle-la-Forge (8)
32.	SS Domfrontaise (8)	6–1	AM La Ferrière-aux-Etangs (9)
33.	ES Écouves (9)	2–3	FC Flers (6)
34.	AS Verson (7)	0–1	AS Villers Houlgate Côte Fleurie (7)
35.	AS Saint-Philbert-des-Champs (10)	0–6	SC Hérouvillais (7)
36.	AS Saint-Aignan-Langanneerie (11)	0–3	ESFC Falaise (7)
37.	CA Lisieux (7)	1–1 (3–4 p)	Maladrerie OS (6)
38.	US Pétruvienne (11)	0–10	USON Mondeville (6)
39.	AC Démouville-Cuverville (10)	0–5	FC Troarn (8)
40.	ES Cormelles (10)	1–2	AS Saint-Désir (10)
41.	AS Potigny-Villers-Canivet-Ussy (8)	3–2	FC Baie de l'Orne (8)
42.	FC Hastings Rots (9)	2–1	US Guérinière (9)
43.	CL Colombellois (9)	1–1 (2–4 p)	LC Bretteville-sur-Odon (7)
44.	Cresserons-Hermanville-Lion Terre et Mer (10)	1–4	AS Ifs (7)
45.	USM Blainvillaise (8)	2–4	AS Trouville-Deauville (6)
46.	ES Thury-Harcourt (8)	5–1	Inter Odon FC (9)
47.	Dozulé FC (9)	0–4	ASPTT Caen (6)
48.	Stade Saint-Sauveurais (8)	1–2	USC Mézidon (7)
49.	UA Saint-Sever (10)	5–1	US Maisons (11)
50.	AS Saint-Vigor-le-Grand (8)	0–1	JS Douvres (7)
51.	FC Caen Sud Ouest (10)	0–3	Réveil Saint-Germain Courseulles-sur-Mer (8)
52.	AF Basly (12)	2–0	JS Audrieu (9)
53.	ES Carpiquet (8)	4–3	US Trévières (9)
54.	ES Saint Aubinaise (11)	0–8	Bourguébus-Soliers FC (7)
55.	USI Bessin Nord (8)	2–1	US Aunay-sur-Odon (8)
56.	FC Thaon-Bretteville-Le Fresne (8)	1–0	US Villers-Bocage (8)
57.	US Pont-l'Évêque (8)	1–1 (4–3 p)	AJS Ouistreham (7)
58.	Charleval FC (11)	0–3	ES Vallée de l'Oison (8)
59.	FC Pays du Neubourg (8)	0–1	FAC Alizay (8)
60.	AS Criquebeuf (10)	0–1	US Conches (8)
61.	ES Vexin Ouest (12)	1–4	SC Thiberville (8)
62.	FC Eure Madrie Seine (8)	0–4	FC Gisors Vexin Normand (6)
63.	FC Serquigny-Nassandres (8)	1–0	FCI Bel Air (9)
64.	CS Orbecquois-Vespèrois (9)	2–4	CA Pont-Audemer (8)
65.	US Rugles-Lyre (8)	2–4	Saint-Sébastien Foot (7)
66.	FC Garennes-Bueil-La Couture-Breuilpont (8)	1–1 (2–4 p)	SC Bernay (8)
67.	CS Beaumont-le-Roger (8)	0–3	AS Val de Reuil-Vaudreuil-Poses (7)
68.	Stade Porte Normande Vernon (7)	2–0	Pacy Ménilles RC (6)
69.	FC Hennezis Vexin Sud (11)	0–0 (5–4 p)	US Gasny (9)
70.	FC Illiers-l'Évêque (8)	0–1	Saint Marcel Foot (7)
71.	ES Normanville (8)	4–1	FA Roumois (9)
72.	FC Épreville (10)	0–1	FC Gruchet-le-Valasse (10)
73.	SS Gournay (8)	5–2	Olympique Havrais Tréfileries-Neiges (7)
74.	CS Gravenchon (8)	1–0	Saint-Romain AC (7)
75.	SC Octevillais (7)	0–2	Athleti'Caux FC (8)
76.	US Cap de Caux (7)	0–0 (3–4 p)	USF Fécamp (7)
77.	US Sennevillaise (*)	0–6	ESM Gonfreville (6)
78.	Gainneville AC (8)	2–5	Le Havre Caucriauville Sportif (8)
79.	CSSM Le Havre (6)	0–1	ES Mont-Gaillard (7)
80.	US Presqu'ile (12)	0–3	Plateau de Quincampoix FC (8)
81.	Vieux-Manoir FC (10)	0–2	Grand-Quevilly FC (6)
82.	FC Saint-Julien Petit Quevilly (8)	8–0	AC Bray Est (8)
83.	Stade Sottevillais CC (6)	1–2	AS Madrillet Château Blanc (7)
84.	AL Déville-Maromme (6)	0–1	CO Cléon (7)
85.	AS Canton d'Argueil (8)	2–2 (6–5 p)	Mont-Saint-Aignan FC (8)
86.	US Forêt de Roumare (10)	0–5	Caudebec-Saint-Pierre FC (7)
87.	AS Buchy (10)	2–1	Rouen Sapins FC Grand-Mare (7)
88.	ES Montigny La Vaupalière (*)	1–2	FC Saint-Étienne-du-Rouvray (8)
89.	FC Le Trait-Duclair (7)	2–6	US Mesnil-Esnard/Franqueville (6)
90.	Canteleu FC (12)	1–0	GCO Bihorel (7)
91.	Amicale Malaunay (9)	4–4 (4–3 p)	Saint-Aubin FC (7)
92.	Stade Grand Quevilly (8)	0–1	FUSC Bois-Guillaume (6)
93.	FC Barentinois (9)	1–1 (4–2 p)	Amicale Houlmoise Bondevillaise FC (7)
94.	ES Plateau-Foucarmont-Réalcamp (8)	0–0 (2–4 p)	US Normande 76 (9)
95.	Cany FC (8)	1–1 (4–5 p)	AS Fauvillaise (8)
96.	Neuville AC (8)	2–4	Olympique Pavillais (6)
97.	FC Biville-la-Baignarde (11)	1–7	JS Saint-Nicolas-d'Aliermont-Béthune (8)
98.	FC Offranville (8)	6–0	US Auffay (9)
99.	FC Neufchâtel (8)	3–1	US Doudeville (9)
100.	Eu FC (9)	2–1	AS Tréport (8)
101.	FC Petit Caux (10)	0–4	Entente Vienne et Saâne (8)
102.	AS Ouvillaise (9)	0–7	US Luneraysienne (7)
103.	FC Tôtes (8)	3–0	AS Ourville (8)
104.	AS Sassetot-Thérouldeville (9)	0–5	ES Tourville (7)
105.	US Londinières (10)	1–2	AJC Bosc-le-Hard (8)
106.	US des Falaises (12)	1–3	GS Saint-Aubin Saint-Vigor (10)
107.	US Lillebonne (8)	4–3	SC Frileuse (7)
108.	ASL Ramponneau (12)	0–4	US Godervillais (8)
109.	US Bolbec (7)	3–1	Yvetot AC (6)

=== Third round ===
These matches were played on 17, 18 and 19 September 2021.

Third round results: Normandy
Tie no	Home team (tier)	Score	Away team (tier)
1.	FC Thaon-Bretteville-Le Fresne (8)	0–1	ES Carpiquet (8)
2.	Bourguébus-Soliers FC (7)	0–1	Jeunesse Fertoise Bagnoles (7)
3.	Eu FC (9)	2–1	ESM Gonfreville (6)
4.	USON Mondeville (6)	1–2	AF Virois (5)
5.	FC Équeurdreville-Hainneville (7)	3–1	Bayeux FC (5)
6.	SS Domfrontaise (8)	0–4	FC Flers (6)
7.	AS Val de Reuil-Vaudreuil-Poses (7)	5–2	CS Gravenchon (8)
8.	FC Saint-Étienne-du-Rouvray (8)	1–3	Évreux FC 27 (5)
9.	Le Havre Caucriauville Sportif (8)	2–1	AS Villers Houlgate Côte Fleurie (7)
10.	Saint-Sébastien Foot (7)	5–1	Saint Marcel Foot (7)
11.	FC Gisors Vexin Normand (6)	3–1	ES Mont-Gaillard (7)
12.	SC Thiberville (8)	0–2	FC Saint-Julien Petit Quevilly (8)
13.	FC Gruchet-le-Valasse (10)	1–10	AS Trouville-Deauville (6)
14.	US Conches (8)	1–1 (1–3 p)	ES Normanville (8)
15.	GS Saint-Aubin Saint-Vigor (10)	3–3 (4–2 p)	ES Vallée de l'Oison (8)
16.	Caudebec-Saint-Pierre FC (7)	4–2	US Pont-l'Évêque (8)
17.	CA Pont-Audemer (8)	3–0	Amicale Malaunay (9)
18.	SC Bernay (8)	0–2	SU Dives-Cabourg (5)
19.	FAC Alizay (8)	0–8	Grand-Quevilly FC (6)
20.	AS Fauvillaise (8)	1–2	Athleti'Caux FC (8)
21.	AS Madrillet Château Blanc (7)	1–1 (4–5 p)	FC Neufchâtel (8)
22.	CO Cléon (7)	7–0	AJC Bosc-le-Hard (8)
23.	US Mesnil-Esnard/Franqueville (6)	1–2	US Bolbec (7)
24.	FC Tôtes (8)	0–3	FC Barentinois (9)
25.	Entente Vienne et Saâne (8)	2–3	Olympique Pavillais (6)
26.	Canteleu FC (12)	1–3	Romilly Pont-Saint-Pierre FC (5)
27.	FUSC Bois-Guillaume (6)	1–1 (8–7 p)	FC Dieppe (5)
28.	US Normande 76 (9)	1–2	FC Offranville (8)
29.	Plateau de Quincampoix FC (8)	4–2	US Lillebonne (8)
30.	ES Tourville (7)	1–1 (Note: Match abandoned during the penalty shoot-out due to racist comments from the crowd. ES Tourville penalised, SS Gournay qualify.)	SS Gournay (8)
31.	AS Buchy (10)	0–1	JS Saint-Nicolas-d'Aliermont-Béthune (8)
32.	US Godervillais (8)	1–2	AS Canton d'Argueil (8)
33.	USF Fécamp (7)	0–0 (4–5 p)	US Luneraysienne (7)
34.	ES Saint-Sauveur-La Ronde-Haye (9)	3–0	US Mortagnaise (7)
35.	Condé Sports (8)	0–1	AS Tourlaville (6)
36.	ES Gouville-sur-Mer (9)	0–3	AS Ifs (7)
37.	AF Basly (12)	0–8	AS Cherbourg Football (5)
38.	US Côte des Isles (7)	0–2	JS Douvres (7)
39.	AS Thèreval (9)	3–5	FC Troarn (8)
40.	Réveil Saint-Germain Courseulles-sur-Mer (8)	1–1 (4–5 p)	ES Plain (9)
41.	US La Glacerie (10)	0–4	Maladrerie OS (6)
42.	Agneaux FC (7)	2–0	SC Hérouvillais (7)
43.	FC Hastings Rots (9)	3–3 (2–4 p)	LC Bretteville-sur-Odon (7)
44.	Périers SF (10)	0–5	AS Valognes (8)
45.	US Vasteville-Acqueville (10)	1–15	FC Saint-Lô Manche (5)
46.	US Ouest Cotentin (7)	2–2 (5–6 p)	USI Bessin Nord (8)
47.	UC Bricquebec (8)	1–5	ASPTT Caen (6)
48.	Stade Porte Normande Vernon (7)	1–0	FC Serquigny-Nassandres (8)
49.	AS La Selle-la-Forge (8)	3–1	US Athis (8)
50.	ES Thury-Harcourt (8)	3–1	US Saint-Quentin-sur-le-Homme (9)
51.	UA Saint-Sever (10)	0–5	FC Argentan (6)
52.	Espérance Condé-sur-Sarthe (8)	0–4	US Saint-Pairaise (7)
53.	FC Pays Aiglon (8)	2–7	US Alençon (5)
54.	USC Mézidon (7)	5–0	Tessy-Moyon Sports (8)
55.	AS Cerencaise (11)	0–6	AG Caennaise (5)
56.	US Percy (9)	2–3	ESFC Falaise (7)
57.	AS Potigny-Villers-Canivet-Ussy (8)	0–2	AS Sarceaux Espoir (9)
58.	AS Saint-Désir (10)	3–0	AS Courteille Alençon (7)
59.	FC Sienne (11)	3–0	FC Écouché (10)
60.	FC Hennezis Vexin Sud (11)	1–3	CMS Oissel (5)

=== Fourth round ===
These matches were played on 2 and 3 October 2021, with one postponed until 10 October 2021, pending an appeal from the previous round.

Fourth round results: Normandy
Tie no	Home team (tier)	Score	Away team (tier)
1.	FC Flers (6)	1–3	FC Saint-Lô Manche (5)
2.	AS Valognes (8)	1–2	AG Caennaise (5)
3.	AS Ifs (7)	0–0 (4–5 p)	US Saint-Pairaise (7)
4.	ES Saint-Sauveur-La Ronde-Haye (9)	0–2	FC Argentan (6)
5.	LC Bretteville-sur-Odon (7)	1–3	US Granville (4)
6.	Maladrerie OS (6)	4–0	USC Mézidon (7)
7.	USI Bessin Nord (8)	1–8	US Alençon (5)
8.	JS Douvres (7)	1–1 (3–5 p)	AS Cherbourg Football (5)
9.	ESFC Falaise (7)	1–2	FC Équeurdreville-Hainneville (7)
10.	FC Troarn (8)	3–0	Jeunesse Fertoise Bagnoles (7)
11.	AS Sarceaux Espoir (9)	0–3	Agneaux FC (7)
12.	ES Plain (9)	0–2	AS Tourlaville (6)
13.	FC Sienne (11)	0–8	ASPTT Caen (6)
14.	ES Carpiquet (8)	1–0	ES Thury-Harcourt (8)
15.	AS La Selle-la-Forge (8)	0–7	AF Virois (5)
16.	AS Saint-Désir (10)	0–2	Athleti'Caux FC (8)
17.	AS Canton d'Argueil (8)	0–6	AS Val de Reuil-Vaudreuil-Poses (7)
18.	SU Dives-Cabourg (5)	5–0	FC Gisors Vexin Normand (6)
19.	Stade Porte Normande Vernon (7)	0–1	FUSC Bois-Guillaume (6)
20.	Plateau de Quincampoix FC (8)	2–6	Olympique Pavillais (6)
21.	FC Saint-Julien Petit Quevilly (8)	2–2 (4–3 p)	Grand-Quevilly FC (6)
22.	GS Saint-Aubin Saint-Vigor (10)	0–3	CA Pont-Audemer (8)
23.	JS Saint-Nicolas-d'Aliermont-Béthune (8)	4–2	Saint-Sébastien Foot (7)
24.	US Bolbec (7)	2–2 (2–4 p)	AS Trouville-Deauville (6)
25.	FC Offranville (8)	3–1	Romilly Pont-Saint-Pierre FC (5)
26.	ES Normanville (8)	0–1	FC Neufchâtel (8)
27.	SS Gournay (8)	1–5	Évreux FC 27 (5)
28.	FC Barentinois (9)	0–3	CMS Oissel (5)
29.	Le Havre Caucriauville Sportif (8)	3–3 (0–2 p)	Caudebec-Saint-Pierre FC (7)
30.	CO Cléon (7)	0–1	FC Rouen (4)
31.	Eu FC (9)	2–2 (9–10 p)	US Luneraysienne (7)

=== Fifth round ===
These matches were played on 16 and 17 October 2021.

Fifth round results: Normandy
Tie no	Home team (tier)	Score	Away team (tier)
1.	FC Neufchâtel (8)	1–3	FC Saint-Julien Petit Quevilly (8)
2.	FC Troarn (8)	0–1	FC Offranville (8)
3.	US Saint-Pairaise (7)	2–0	FUSC Bois-Guillaume (6)
4.	CA Pont-Audemer (8)	0–3	AS Trouville-Deauville (6)
5.	FC Argentan (6)	0–1	US Granville (4)
6.	ES Carpiquet (8)	1–2	Olympique Pavillais (6)
7.	ASPTT Caen (6)	0–0 (4–3 p)	US Avranches (3)
8.	Maladrerie OS (6)	0–3	FC Rouen (4)
9.	Athleti'Caux FC (8)	1–3	JS Saint-Nicolas-d'Aliermont-Béthune (8)
10.	US Luneraysienne (7)	2–2 (1–3 p)	CMS Oissel (5)
11.	Caudebec-Saint-Pierre FC (7)	0–3	AG Caennaise (5)
12.	Agneaux FC (7)	0–2	FC Saint-Lô Manche (5)
13.	AS Val de Reuil-Vaudreuil-Poses (7)	2–2 (6–5 p)	AF Virois (5)
14.	FC Équeurdreville-Hainneville (7)	0–2	US Alençon (5)
15.	AS Cherbourg Football (5)	2–2 (3–1 p)	SU Dives-Cabourg (5)
16.	AS Tourlaville (6)	0–1	Évreux FC 27 (5)

=== Sixth round ===
These matches were played on 30 and 31 October 2021.

Sixth round results: Normandy
Tie no	Home team (tier)	Score	Away team (tier)
1.	FC Saint-Lô Manche (5)	1–0	ASPTT Caen (6)
2.	FC Saint-Julien Petit Quevilly (8)	1–0	FC Offranville (8)
3.	US Granville (4)	1–3	AG Caennaise (5)
4.	FC Rouen (4)	3–0	AS Cherbourg Football (5)
5.	Olympique Pavillais (6)	0–5	AS Trouville-Deauville (6)
6.	US Saint-Pairaise (7)	0–2	AS Val de Reuil-Vaudreuil-Poses (7)
7.	US Alençon (5)	0–3	Évreux FC 27 (5)
8.	JS Saint-Nicolas-d'Aliermont-Béthune (8)	1–2	CMS Oissel (5)
