= 2020–21 Coupe de France preliminary rounds, Normandy =

The 2020–21 Coupe de France preliminary rounds, Normandy was the qualifying competition to decide which teams from the leagues of the Normandy region of France took part in the main competition from the seventh round.

A total of seven teams qualified from the Normandy preliminary rounds. In 2019–20 FC Rouen, US Granville and ESM Gonfreville all progressed furthest in the main competition, reaching the round of 32 before losing to Angers (1–4), Marseille (0–3) and Lille (0–2) respectively.

== Schedule ==
A total of 394 teams from the region entered the competition. A preliminary round was required, with 82 teams from District leagues involved, which took place on 30 August 2020. The remaining teams from the District leagues, and teams from Régionale 2 and Régionale 3 divisions, totalling 275, entered at the first round stage on 6 September 2020. The 20 Régionale 1 teams entered at the second round stage on 13 September 2020.

The third round draw, which saw the entry of the clubs from Championnat National 3, was made on 15 September 2020. The fourth round draw, which saw the entry of the clubs from Championnat National 2, was made on 24 September 2020. The fifth round draw, which saw the entry of the two Championnat National clubs from the region, took place on 7 October 2020. The sixth round draw was made on 21 October 2020.

=== Preliminary round ===
These matches were played on 30 August 2020.

Preliminary round results: Normandy
Tie no	Home team (tier)	Score	Away team (tier)
1.	Claies de Vire FC (12)	0–0 (5–3 p)	Entente Le Lorey-Hauteville-Feugères (11)
2.	US Sainte-Cécile (11)	1–2	AS Bérigny-Cerisy (11)
3.	ASJ Blainville-Saint-Malo (11)	2–1	ES Pirou (11)
4.	CS Barfleur (12)	0–9	FC Digosville (10)
5.	ÉR Mesnil-au-Val (12)	2–2 (5–4 p)	AS Montebourg (11)
6.	US Pontorson (11)	4–1	AS Sacey (11)
7.	US Gavray (11)	2–4	ES Tirepied (10)
8.	FC Sienne (11)	0–2	AS Cerencaise (11)
9.	AS Guilberville (11)	2–2 (3–1 p)	US Auvers-Baupte (10)
10.	FC Saint-Jean-de-Daye (12)	1–1 (3–4 p)	ES Marigny-Lozon-Mesnil-Vigot (11)
11.	US Pierreville-Saint-Germain-le-Gaillard (11)	4–1 (Note: Tie reversed from original draw.)	FC Bretteville-en-Saire (11)
12.	ASS Urville-Nacqueville (11)	4–0	Bricqueboscq-Saint-Christophe-Grosville Sport (12)
13.	Amicale Chailloué (10)	1–2	Vedette do Boisthorel (11)
14.	ES Pays d'Ouche (11)	1–1 (7–8 p)	Soligny-Aspres-Moulins Football (10)
15.	AC Démouville-Cuverville (10)	2–1	AS Biéville-Beuville (11)
16.	AS La Hoguette (11)	1–4	Croissanville FC (11)
17.	AS Ouilly-le-Vicomte (10)	4–0	EF Touques-Saint-Gratien (11)
18.	Fontenay-le-Pesnel FC (12)	2–2 (3–4 p)	Cambes-en-Plaine Sports (11)
19.	US Maisons (11)	3–5	Saint-Paul-du-Vernay FC (11)
20.	FC Baventais (12)	0–3	FC Rocquancourt (10)
21.	ES Sannerville-Touffréville (11)	5–3	FC Mouen (1)
22.	ES Courtonnaise (11)	0–2	ES Bonnebosq (11)
23.	US Le Tourneur (11)	1–1 (5–4 p)	ES Tronquay (11)
24.	FC Vital (11)	0–2	ES Saint Aubinaise (11)
25.	US Pétruvienne (11)	6–0	FC Langrune-Luc (10)
26.	US Viettoise (11)	1–2	ES Cormelles (10)
27.	AS Ailly-Fontaine-Bellenger (10)	3–1	RC Léry (11)
28.	Beuzeville AC (11)	0–2	US Saint-Germain-la-Campagne (11)
29.	RC Muids-Daubeuf-Vauvray (11)	0–2	Charleval FC (11)
30.	RC Malherbe Surville (12)	2–5	FC Madrie (11)
31.	Louviers FC (12)	2–5	CS Lyonsais (12)
32.	Stade Vernolien (10)	5–0	ES Angerville/Baux-Ste Croix/Plessis-Grohan/Ventes (10)
33.	FC Martin-Église (11)	0–1	US Londinières (10)
34.	FC Biville-la-Baignarde (11)	0–4	US Grèges (10)
35.	AS Allouville-Bellefosse (10)	0–2	Olympique Belmesnil (10)
36.	ASL Ramponneau (12)	2–2 (0–2 p)	FC Épreville (10)
37.	ES Étoutteville Yvecrique (10)	8–3	AS Angerville-l'Orcher (10)
38.	RC Étalondes (10)	1–0	FC Ventois (10)
39.	AS Saint-Martin-de-Boscherville (10)	4–0	US des Vallées (10)
40.	US Saint-Jacques-sur-Darnétal (10)	2–3	FC Nord Ouest (10)
41.	US Saint-Thomas (12)	2–2 (3–1 p) (Note: US Saint-Thomas penalised for fielding several players with invalid medical certificates. JS Fontenay qualify.)	JS Fontenay (11)

=== First round ===
These matches were played on 6 September 2020.

First round results: Normandy
Tie no	Home team (tier)	Score	Away team (tier)
1.	US Saint-Quentin-sur-le-Homme (9)	1–1 (4–1 p)	CS Villedieu (8)
2.	ES Gouville-sur-Mer (9)	0–0 (4–5 p)	Espérance Saint-Jean-des-Champs (8)
3.	AS Bérigny-Cerisy (11)	1–3	Condé Sports (8)
4.	FC Val-Saint-Père (9)	1–4	Patriote Saint-Jamaise (8)
5.	AS Cerencaise (11)	1–3	US Saint-Pairaise (7)
6.	ES Munevillaise (10)	1–7	Agneaux FC (7)
7.	La Bréhalaise FC (9)	0–0 (2–4 p)	ES Coutances (7)
8.	US Roncey-Cerisy (10)	0–3	Saint-Hilaire-Virey-Landelles (8)
9.	US Pontorson (11)	0–7	AS Jullouville-Sartilly (8)
10.	USM Donville (9)	2–2 (4–3 p)	AS Brécey (9)
11.	ES Plain (9)	0–1	AS Valognes (8)
12.	US La Glacerie (10)	0–5	ES Pointe Hague (7)
13.	FC de l'Elle (9)	0–4	CS Carentan (7)
14.	Périers SF (10)	0–4	US Côte-des-Isles (7)
15.	US Lessay (10)	0–6	FC Agon-Coutainville (8)
16.	CA Pontois (9)	3–0	Créances SF (8)
17.	ÉR Mesnil-au-Val (12)	0–3	SCU Douve Divette (8)
18.	FC Digosville (10)	1–3	UC Bricquebec (8)
19.	AS Pointe Cotentin (9)	1–7	FC Équeurdreville-Hainneville (7)
20.	ASS Urville-Nacqueville (11)	1–3	AS Querqueville (9)
21.	US Pierreville-Saint-Germain-le-Gaillard (11)	0–3	PL Octeville (9)
22.	US Vasteville-Acqueville (10)	1–4	FC Val de Saire (8)
23.	SM Haytillon (10)	1–2	US Ouest Cotentin (7)
24.	ES Marigny-Lozon-Mesnil-Vigot (11)	1–4	ES des Marais (10)
25.	Claies de Vire FC (12)	0–9	ES Saint-Sauveur-La Ronde-Haye (9)
26.	ASJ Blainville-Saint-Malo (11)	2–6	FC 3 Rivières (8)
27.	AS Guilberville (11)	0–3	US Sainte-Croix Saint-Lô (9)
28.	ES Tirepied (10)	1–0	US Saint-Martin Saint-Jean-de-la Haize (9)
29.	US Percy (9)	2–4	Tessy-Moyon Sports (8)
30.	ES Terregate-Beuvron-Juilley (10)	0–1	USCO Sourdeval (8)
31.	ES Hébécrevon (9)	1–6	FC des Etangs (8)
32.	US Randonnai (9)	0–3	ES Écouves (9)
33.	Avenir Saint-Germain-du-Corbéis (8)	2–1	US Mortagnaise (7)
34.	AS Gacé (9)	0–2	FC Pays Aiglon (8)
35.	AS Berd'huis Foot (9)	3–2	Espérance Condé-sur-Sarthe (8)
36.	FL Ségrie-Fontaine (10)	1–4	Vimoutiers FC (8)
37.	FC Landais (10)	1–2	FC Écouché (10)
38.	AS Boucé (9)	2–1	OC Briouze (8)
39.	FC Detente Chambois-Fel (10)	0–7	US Andaine (8)
40.	AS Monts d'Andaine (9)	2–2 (4–5 p)	Leopards Saint-Georges (8)
41.	SC Damigny (10)	0–1	CO Ceaucé (9)
42.	FC Putanges-le-Lac (10)	2–2 (4–2 p)	Avenir Messei (8)
43.	JS Tinchebray (10)	1–1 (4–3 p)	AS Passais-Saint-Fraimbault (9)
44.	US Ménil-de-Briouze (10)	1–10	AS La Selle-la-Forge (8)
45.	SL Petruvien (9)	1–1 (2–3 p)	SS Domfrontaise (8)
46.	Vedette do Boisthorel (11)	1–3	US Rugles-Lyre (8)
47.	Soligny-Aspres-Moulins Football (10)	2–2 (3–4 p)	AS Valburgeoise (9)
48.	AS Sarceaux Espoir (9)	0–6	AS Courteille Alençon (7)
49.	US Mêloise (10)	3–1	Sées FC (9)
50.	US Athis (8)	1–4	Jeunesse Fertoise Bagnoles (7)
51.	US Guérinière (9)	0–5	AS Saint-Vigor-le-Grand (8)
52.	AS Saint-Philbert-des-Champs (10)	2–2 (4–2 p)	AS Ouilly-le-Vicomte (10)
53.	FM Condé-en-Normandie (10)	2–2 (4–5 p)	USI La Graverie (10)
54.	USI Bessin Nord (8)	3–0	CL Colombellois (9)
55.	MSL Garcelles-Secqueville (10)	1–9	USM Blainvillaise (8)
56.	CS Orbecquois-Vespèrois (9)	1–0	ES Livarotaise (8)
57.	Saint-Paul-du-Vernay FC (11)	2–4	ES Carpiquet (8)
58.	US Authie (10)	2–5	FC Thaon-Bretteville-Le Fresne (8)
59.	US Pétruvienne (11)	5–1 (Note: Tie reversed from original draw.)	Cambes-en-Plaine Sports (11)
60.	Cresserons-Hermanville-Lion Terre et Mer (10)	1–2	Dozulé FC (9)
61.	ES Saint Aubinaise (11)	1–5	ES Sannerville-Touffréville (11)
62.	FC Caen Sud Ouest (10)	2–3	Muance FC (8)
63.	UA Saint-Sever (10)	2–3	AS Vaudry-Truttemer (8)
64.	AS Cahagnes (10)	0–3	ES Thury-Harcourt (8)
65.	AC Démouville-Cuverville (10)	1–3	US Pont-l'Évêque (8)
66.	US Villerville (10)	0–1	CS Honfleur (8)
67.	Croissanville FC (11)	1–2	AS Potigny-Villers-Canivet-Ussy (8)
68.	ASL Chemin Vert (10)	1–2	FC Troarn (8)
69.	ES Bonnebosq (11)	0–2	Stade Saint-Sauveurais (8)
70.	FC Rocquancourt (10)	1–10	FC Baie de l'Orne (8)
71.	US Le Tourneur (11)	1–6	US Aunay-sur-Odon (8)
72.	US Cheux-Saint-Manvieu-Norrey (9)	0–6	ESFC Falaise (7)
73.	FC Moyaux (9)	1–16	AS Villers Houlgate Côte Fleurie (7)
74.	ES Val de l'Orne (10)	3–6	ES Portaise (9)
75.	US Tilly-sur-Seulles (10)	2–1	ESI May-sur-Orne (9)
76.	ES Cormelles (10)	1–9	US Villers-Bocage (8)
77.	US Trévières (9)	0–7	AS Verson (7)
78.	AS Saint-Cyr-Fervaques (9)	0–2	CA Lisieux (7)
79.	JS Fleury-sur-Orne (9)	1–3	SC Hérouvillais (7)
80.	Inter Odon FC (9)	4–5	USC Mézidon (7)
81.	FC Hastings Rots (9)	2–0	Bourguébus-Soliers FC (7)
82.	JS Audrieu (9)	1–1 (1–3 p)	Réveil Saint-Germain Courseulles-sur-Mer (8)
83.	Lystrienne Sportive (9)	0–2	LC Bretteville-sur-Odon (7)
84.	Association Caen Sud (9)	0–4	JS Douvres (7)
85.	AS Giberville (9)	2–7	AJS Ouistreham (7)
86.	Cingal FC (9)	0–3	AS Ifs (7)
87.	AS Vièvre (10)	0–12	CA Pont-Audemer (8)
88.	Charleval FC (11)	1–4	US Conches (8)
89.	US Saint-Germain-la-Campagne (11)	1–1 (3–2 p)	FC Pays du Neubourg (8)
90.	US Cormeilles-Lieurey (10)	3–2	SC Bernay (8)
91.	AS Courcelles (9)	0–0 (3–2 p)	FC Seine-Eure (8)
92.	US Gasny (9)	1–2	AS Val de Reuil-Vaudreuil-Poses (7)
93.	FCI Bel Air (9)	1–1 (3–4 p)	SC Thiberville (8)
94.	FC Roumois Nord (9)	0–2	FC Val de Risle (8)
95.	AL Saint-Michel Évreux (10)	2–1	Saint Marcel Foot (7)
96.	Fusion Charentonne Saint-Aubin (10)	1–4	Club Andelle Pîtres (8)
97.	AS Ailly-Fontaine-Bellenger (10)	0–4	Saint-Sébastien Foot (7)
98.	SC Quittebeuf (10)	0–4	FC Serquigny-Nassandres (8)
99.	AS Vallée de l'Andelle (10)	0–4	FC Garennes-Bueil-La Couture-Breuilpont (8)
100.	US Étrépagny (10)	0–2	Stade Porte Normande Vernon (7)
101.	AS Criquebeuf (10)	1–1 (10–11 p)	CS Beaumont-le-Roger (8)
102.	AS Andréseinne (10)	3–5	ES Normanville (8)
103.	Stade Vernolien (10)	2–1	FC Illiers-l'Évêque (8)
104.	La Croix Vallée d'Eure (10)	1–1 (5–3 p)	FC Eure Madrie Seine (8)
105.	CS Lyonsais (12)	0–15	FAC Alizay (8)
106.	FC Madrie (11)	0–2	ES Vallée de l'Oison (8)
107.	FC Anneville-Manéhouville-Crosville (9)	0–6	Eu FC (9)
108.	Yerville FC (10)	0–3	AS Ourville (8)
109.	US Doudeville (9)	0–0 (3–4 p)	USF Fécamp (7)
110.	ES Étoutteville-Yvecrique (10)	4–2	US Veauville-lès-Baons (10)
111.	AS Saint-Martin-de-Boscherville (10)	2–2 (3–5 p)	Entente Motteville/Croix-Mare (9)
112.	Boucle de Seine (9)	3–1	Association Rouennaise Football (9)
113.	FC Offranville (8)	3–1	Cany FC (8)
114.	FC Copains d'Abord (10)	0–1	US Envermeu (10)
115.	US Sainte Marie-des-Champs (9)	0–4	US Bacqueville-Pierreville (10)
116.	FC Bréauté-Bretteville (10)	0–1	AS Fauvillaise (8)
117.	FC Barentinois (9)	1–1 (2–1 p)	Mont-Saint-Aignan FC (8)
118.	Amicale Malaunay (9)	0–1	FC Le Trait-Duclair (7)
119.	AL Tourville-la-Rivière (10)	4–3	FC Saint-Étienne-du-Rouvray (8)
120.	FC Épreville (10)	2–1	AS Sassetot-Thérouldeville (9)
121.	RC Havrais (9)	6–1	AS Montivilliers (8)
122.	Belleville FC (10)	0–1	JS Saint-Nicolas-d'Aliermont-Béthune (8)
123.	Stade Grand Quevilly (8)	1–1 (4–2 p)	Caudebec-Saint-Pierre FC (7)
124.	JS Fontenay (11)	0–4	FC Gruchet-le-Valasse (10)
125.	US Crielloise (10)	0–1	ES Aumaloise (9)
126.	Olympique Darnétal (9)	0–1	Amicale Houlmoise Bondevillaise FC (7)
127.	ESI Saint-Antoine (9)	1–4	Saint-Romain AC (7)
128.	Olympique Belmesnil (10)	0–1	AJC Bosc-le-Hard (8)
129.	US Grèges (10)	2–1	CA Longuevillais (9)
130.	RC Étalondes (10)	0–3	ES Plateau-Foucarmont-Réalcamp (8)
131.	AS Saint-Pierre-de-Varengeville (9)	1–2	AS Madrillet Château Blanc (7)
132.	US Londinières (10)	0–3	US Auffay (9)
133.	FC Bonsecours-Saint-Léger (9)	0–2	Saint-Aubin FC (7)
134.	US des Falaises (12)	1–2	Entente Saint-Martin/Saint-Pierre (10)
135.	Gainneville AC (8)	1–2	SC Octevillais (7)
136.	US Épouville (8)	1–3	Olympique Havrais Tréfileries-Neiges (7)
137.	AS Sainte-Adresse But (10)	0–8	Le Havre Caucriauville Sportif (8)
138.	US Godervillais (8)	1–4	SC Frileuse (7)
139.	SS Gournay (8)	4–2	US Cap de Caux (7)
140.	GS Sain-Aubin Saint-Vigor (10)	0–2	Le Havre FC 2012 (9)
141.	Athleti'Caux FC (8)	0–0 (4–5 p)	US Bolbec (7)
142.	US Normande 76 (9)	2–0	Neuville AC (8)
143.	AS Vallée du Dun (10)	1–1 (6–5 p)	AS Ouvillaise (9)
144.	FC Petit Caux (10)	0–6	Entente Vienne et Saâne (8)
145.	AS La Bouille Moulineaux (11)	0–2	FC Saint-Julien Petit Quevilly (8)
146.	Isneauville FC (10)	1–5	US Saint-Jean-du-Cardonnay-Fresquiennes (10)
147.	AS Mesnières-en-Bray (10)	2–2 (3–2 p)	ES Arques (8)
148.	US Vatteville Brotonne (10)	1–5	US Lillebonne (8)
149.	FC Tôtes (8)	1–5	ES Tourville (7)
150.	AC Bray Est (8)	2–2 (5–3 p)	Rouen Sapins FC Grand-Mare (7)
151.	ES Janval (9)	3–3 (4–2 p)	AS Tréport (8)
152.	FC Nord Ouest (10)	0–8	CO Cléon (7)
153.	Vieux-Manoir FC (10)	0–8	AS Gournay-en-Bray (8)
154.	Plateau de Quincampoix FC (8)	1–2	GCO Bihorel (7)
155.	FC Fréville-Bouville SIVOM (9)	– (Note: Match abandoned, with the scoreline 5–2, after an altercation between players on both teams. Both sides penalised and removed from the competition.)	CS Gravenchon (8)
156.	ASPTT Rouen (10)	1–5	AS Canton d'Argueil (8)
157.	AS Buchy (10)	0–1	FC Neufchâtel (8)
158.	Stade Valeriquais (8)	0–3	US Luneraysienne (7)

=== Second round ===
These matches were played on 11, 12 and 13 September 2020.

Second round results: Normandy
Tie no	Home team (tier)	Score	Away team (tier)
1.	AJS Ouistreham (7)	0–2	AS Villers Houlgate Côte Fleurie (7)
2.	FC Saint-Julien Petit Quevilly (8)	2–0	Saint-Sébastien Foot (7)
3.	CS Beaumont-le-Roger (8)	2–3	Stade Grand Quevilly (8)
4.	FC Serquigny-Nassandres (8)	2–0	US Mesnil-Esnard/Franqueville (6)
5.	US Cormeilles-Lieurey (10)	0–1	Stade Porte Normande Vernon (7)
6.	GCO Bihorel (7)	3–1	Stade Sottevillais CC (6)
7.	FC Le Trait-Duclair (7)	1–2	FUSC Bois-Guillaume (6)
8.	SC Frileuse (7)	2–3	US Lillebonne (8)
9.	USF Fécamp (7)	0–0 (5–3 p)	SC Octevillais (7)
10.	FC Val de Risle (8)	1–3	ES Mont-Gaillard (7)
11.	AS Courcelles (9)	2–2 (2–4 p)	FC Garennes-Bueil-La Couture-Breuilpont (8)
12.	US Saint-Jean-du-Cardonnay-Fresquiennes (10)	1–1 (2–4 p)	FAC Alizay (8)
13.	AL Saint-Michel Évreux (10)	1–1 (2–4 p)	SC Thiberville (8)
14.	JS Douvres (7)	1–3	ASPTT Caen (6)
15.	CS Honfleur (8)	4–0	Saint-Romain AC (7)
16.	US Saint-Germain-la-Campagne (11)	0–0 (2–4 p)	ES Vallée de l'Oison (8)
17.	ES Normanville (8)	4–0	AS Madrillet Château Blanc (7)
18.	AS Val de Reuil-Vaudreuil-Poses (7)	3–2	Amicale Houlmoise Bondevillaise FC (7)
19.	US Grèges (10)	1–4	JS Saint-Nicolas-d'Aliermont-Béthune (8)
20.	Entente Saint-Martin/Saint-Pierre (10)	1–7	US Bacqueville-Pierreville (10)
21.	ES Aumaloise (9)	2–2 (2–4 p)	AC Bray Est (8)
22.	Eu FC (9)	2–3	AS Fauvillaise (8)
23.	FC Gruchet-le-Valasse (10)	1–4	Le Havre Caucriauville Sportif (8)
24.	CO Cléon (7)	0–2	AL Déville-Maromme (6)
25.	AJC Bosc-le-Hard (8)	0–0 (4–5 p)	AS Gournay-en-Bray (8)
26.	Entente Vienne et Saâne (8)	0–0 (6–5 p)	ES Janval (9)
27.	ES Étoutteville-Yvecrique (10)	0–3	US Bolbec (7)
28.	ES Tourville (7)	3–1	FC Neufchâtel (8)
29.	AS Mesnières-en-Bray (10)	1–2	AS Canton d'Argueil (8)
30.	US Auffay (9)	0–1	FC Offranville (8)
31.	AS Vallée du Dun (10)	3–7	AS Ourville (8)
32.	US Normande 76 (9)	0–8	US Luneraysienne (7)
33.	Entente Motteville/Croix-Mare (9)	– (Note: Match void due to both teams in the previous round being removed from the competition.)	winner match 155
34.	US Envermeu (10)	1–4	ES Plateau-Foucarmont-Réalcamp (8)
35.	FC Épreville (10)	1–4	ESM Gonfreville (6)
36.	AL Tourville-la-Rivière (10)	1–2	Yvetot AC (6)
37.	FC Barentinois (9)	1–0	Grand-Quevilly FC (6)
38.	Olympique Pavillais (6)	2–0 (Note: Tie reversed from original draw.)	Club Andelle Pîtres (8)
39.	Boucle de Seine (9)	0–7	Pacy Ménilles RC (6)
40.	Saint-Aubin FC (7)	6–2	US Conches (8)
41.	La Croix Vallée d'Eure (10)	0–1	FC Gisors Vexin Normand (6)
42.	Le Havre FC 2012 (9)	0–6	CA Pont-Audemer (8)
43.	Olympique Havrais Tréfileries-Neiges (7)	3–0	SS Gournay (8)
44.	RC Havrais (9)	0–4	CSSM Le Havre (6)
45.	USI Bessin Nord (8)	1–5	Maladrerie OS (6)
46.	AS Querqueville (9)	0–2	CS Carentan (7)
47.	AS Jullouville-Sartilly (8)	2–0	US Saint-Quentin-sur-le-Homme (9)
48.	Espérance Saint-Jean-des-Champs (8)	6–0	USM Donville (9)
49.	Patriote Saint-Jamaise (8)	1–2	Agneaux FC (7)
50.	JS Tinchebray (10)	0–0 (9–8 p)	USCO Sourdeval (8)
51.	Vimoutiers FC (8)	2–3	FC Argentan (6)
52.	AS Berd'huis Foot (9)	1–3	US Mêloise (10)
53.	FC Écouché (10)	1–5	ESFC Falaise (7)
54.	ES Écouves (9)	0–1	US Rugles-Lyre (8)
55.	AS Courteille Alençon (7)	2–0	AS La Selle-la-Forge (8)
56.	US Sainte-Croix Saint-Lô (9)	0–0 (4–1 p)	ES Tirepied (10)
57.	FC Agon-Coutainville (8)	2–0	US Saint-Pairaise (7)
58.	PL Octeville (9)	1–4	US Côte-des-Isles (7)
59.	US Ouest Cotentin (7)	4–0	Condé Sports (8)
60.	SCU Douve Divette (8)	2–1	CA Pontois (9)
61.	ES Saint-Sauveur-La Ronde-Haye (9)	2–4	AS Tourlaville (6)
62.	ES des Marais (10)	0–6	ES Pointe Hague (7)
63.	AS Valognes (8)	1–2	FC Équeurdreville-Hainneville (7)
64.	UC Bricquebec (8)	2–2 (4–2 p)	FC Val de Saire (8)
65.	FC des Etangs (8)	2–1	Tessy-Moyon Sports (8)
66.	FC 3 Rivières (8)	1–3	ES Coutances (7)
67.	Leopards Saint-Georges (8)	3–4	US Andaine (8)
68.	FC Putanges-le-Lac (10)	0–4	Jeunesse Fertoise Bagnoles (7)
69.	FC Troarn (8)	1–0	USC Mézidon (7)
70.	ES Thury-Harcourt (8)	1–1 (5–4 p)	FC Thaon-Bretteville-Le Fresne (8)
71.	AS Vaudry-Truttemer (8)	0–3	US Villers-Bocage (8)
72.	US Pont-l'Évêque (8)	1–3	Muance FC (8)
73.	FC Baie de l'Orne (8)	1–3	LC Bretteville-sur-Odon (7)
74.	USI La Graverie (10)	0–9	US Aunay-sur-Odon (8)
75.	ES Carpiquet (8)	3–1	ES Portaise (9)
76.	Dozulé FC (9)	2–2 (6–5 p)	Stade Saint-Sauveurais (8)
77.	SC Hérouvillais (7)	1–0	AS Trouville-Deauville (6)
78.	AS Saint-Philbert-des-Champs (10)	1–5	AS Potigny-Villers-Canivet-Ussy (8)
79.	US Pétruvienne (11)	1–8	AS Ifs (7)
80.	SS Domfrontaise (8)	0–2	Saint-Hilaire-Virey-Landelles (8)
81.	CO Ceaucé (9)	1–2	AS Boucé (9)
82.	Avenir Saint-Germain-du-Corbéis (8)	0–2	FC Flers (6)
83.	AS Valburgeoise (9)	2–1	FC Pays Aiglon (8)
84.	AS Saint-Vigor-le-Grand (8)	0–0 (4–2 p)	US Ducey-Isigny (6)
85.	CS Orbecquois-Vespèrois (9)	1–2	Stade Vernolien (10)
86.	USM Blainvillaise (8)	2–6	CA Lisieux (7)
87.	ES Sannerville-Touffréville (11)	1–8	Réveil Saint-Germain Courseulles-sur-Mer (8)
88.	US Tilly-sur-Seulles (10)	1–2	AS Verson (7)
89.	FC Hastings Rots (9)	0–2	USON Mondeville (6)

=== Third round ===
These matches were played on 19 and 20 September 2020.

Third round results: Normandy
Tie no	Home team (tier)	Score	Away team (tier)
1.	ES Pointe Hague (7)	4–0	SCU Douve Divette (8)
2.	UC Bricquebec (8)	0–1	US Ouest Cotentin (7)
3.	CS Carentan (7)	0–2	ASPTT Caen (6)
4.	ES Coutances (7)	0–5	AS Ifs (7)
5.	Espérance Saint-Jean-des-Champs (8)	1–4	AS Cherbourg Football (5)
6.	US Sainte-Croix Saint-Lô (9)	6–2	US Villers-Bocage (8)
7.	FC Agon-Coutainville (8)	0–3	AS Jullouville-Sartilly (8)
8.	US Côte-des-Isles (7)	0–6	FC Équeurdreville-Hainneville (7)
9.	FC des Etangs (8)	0–4	Maladrerie OS (6)
10.	AS Tourlaville (6)	1–1 (4–2 p)	Bayeux FC (5)
11.	Jeunesse Fertoise Bagnoles (7)	4–1	Muance FC (8)
12.	US Mêloise (10)	0–11	US Alençon (5)
13.	AS Courteille Alençon (7)	0–6	AG Caennaise (5)
14.	US Andaine (8)	0–7	AS Villers Houlgate Côte Fleurie (7)
15.	FC Argentan (6)	1–1 (4–2 p)	CA Lisieux (7)
16.	AS Boucé (9)	1–3	ESFC Falaise (7)
17.	AS Valburgeoise (9)	0–1	SU Dives-Cabourg (5)
18.	JS Tinchebray (10)	0–3	Agneaux FC (7)
19.	US Aunay-sur-Odon (8)	2–3	FC Saint-Lô Manche (5)
20.	LC Bretteville-sur-Odon (7)	4–1	Saint-Hilaire-Virey-Landelles (8)
21.	AS Saint-Vigor-le-Grand (8)	1–1 (4–3 p)	SC Hérouvillais (7)
22.	ES Carpiquet (8)	1–0	Dozulé FC (9)
23.	AS Potigny-Villers-Canivet-Ussy (8)	1–3	AS Verson (7)
24.	ES Thury-Harcourt (8)	0–4	FC Flers (6)
25.	FC Troarn (8)	3–2	USON Mondeville (6)
26.	Réveil Saint-Germain Courseulles-sur-Mer (8)	1–4	AF Virois (5)
27.	FC Offranville (8)	6–0	FC Barentinois (9)
28.	US Bacqueville-Pierreville (10)	0–4	US Bolbec (7)
29.	ES Plateau-Foucarmont-Réalcamp (8)	1–0	CMS Oissel (5)
30.	AS Fauvillaise (8)	0–2	Olympique Pavillais (6)
31.	FUSC Bois-Guillaume (6)	1–3	Romilly Pont-Saint-Pierre FC (5)
32.	ES Vallée de l'Oison (8)	– (Note: Match abandoned with the scoreline 3–2. FC Saint-Julien Petit Quevilly penalised. ES Vallée de l'Oison qualify.)	FC Saint-Julien Petit Quevilly (8)
33.	JS Saint-Nicolas-d'Aliermont-Béthune (8)	0–2	FC Dieppe (5)
34.	AS Ourville (8)	2–3	Entente Motteville/Croix-Mare (9)
35.	ES Mont-Gaillard (7)	3–3 (6–5 p)	CSSM Le Havre (6)
36.	AS Gournay-en-Bray (8)	1–4	FC Gisors Vexin Normand (6)
37.	FAC Alizay (8)	5–1	Saint-Aubin FC (7)
38.	FC Garennes-Bueil-La Couture-Breuilpont (8)	1–3	Pacy Ménilles RC (6)
39.	SC Thiberville (8)	2–1	CS Honfleur (8)
40.	AL Déville-Maromme (6)	0–3	AS Val de Reuil-Vaudreuil-Poses (7)
41.	CA Pont-Audemer (8)	1–1 (4–3 p)	Stade Grand Quevilly (8)
42.	US Rugles-Lyre (8)	0–1	Évreux FC 27 (5)
43.	Stade Vernolien (10)	0–5	ES Normanville (8)
44.	AS Canton d'Argueil (8)	3–1	GCO Bihorel (7)
45.	Stade Porte Normande Vernon (7)	2–2 (2–3 p)	FC Serquigny-Nassandres (8)
46.	US Luneraysienne (7)	2–0	USF Fécamp (7)
47.	ESM Gonfreville (6)	8–1	Olympique Havrais Tréfileries-Neiges (7)
48.	Le Havre Caucriauville Sportif (8)	1–0	US Lillebonne (8)
49.	AC Bray Est (8)	0–6	Yvetot AC (6)
50.	Entente Vienne et Saâne (8)	1–1 (4–3 p)	ES Tourville (7)

=== Fourth round ===
These matches were played on 3 and 4 October 2020.

Fourth round results: Normandy
Tie no	Home team (tier)	Score	Away team (tier)
1.	FC Argentan (6)	1–1 (2–3 p)	Jeunesse Fertoise Bagnoles (7)
2.	LC Bretteville-sur-Odon (7)	1–2	FC Troarn (8)
3.	AS Jullouville-Sartilly (8)	0–1	ES Pointe Hague (7)
4.	FC Flers (6)	3–1	US Granville (4)
5.	AS Cherbourg Football (5)	0–1	AS Tourlaville (6)
6.	US Sainte-Croix Saint-Lô (9)	1–5	US Alençon (5)
7.	ES Carpiquet (8)	0–7	FC Saint-Lô Manche (5)
8.	Maladrerie OS (6)	1–4	AG Caennaise (5)
9.	AS Verson (7)	1–2	ESFC Falaise (7)
10.	SC Thiberville (8)	0–3	ASPTT Caen (6)
11.	US Ouest Cotentin (7)	0–0 (4–3 p)	Agneaux FC (7)
12.	AS Ifs (7)	4–0	AS Saint-Vigor-le-Grand (8)
13.	FC Équeurdreville-Hainneville (7)	2–2 (4–5 p)	AF Virois (5)
14.	Pacy Ménilles RC (6)	1–2	AS Villers Houlgate Côte Fleurie (7)
15.	FC Serquigny-Nassandres (8)	0–3	US Luneraysienne (7)
16.	ES Plateau-Foucarmont-Réalcamp (8)	0–1	Olympique Pavillais (6)
17.	CA Pont-Audemer (8)	0–0 (4–1 p)	Yvetot AC (6)
18.	Entente Motteville/Croix-Mare (9)	1–3	FC Gisors Vexin Normand (6)
19.	ES Normanville (8)	1–1 (2–4 p)	ESM Gonfreville (6)
20.	FC Dieppe (5)	1–1 (3–5 p)	Évreux FC 27 (5)
21.	FAC Alizay (8)	1–2	Romilly Pont-Saint-Pierre FC (5)
22.	Le Havre Caucriauville Sportif (8)	2–1	ES Vallée de l'Oison (8)
23.	AS Val de Reuil-Vaudreuil-Poses (7)	3–1	ES Mont-Gaillard (7)
24.	AS Canton d'Argueil (8)	0–3	FC Rouen (4)
25.	US Bolbec (7)	5–4	FC Offranville (8)
26.	Entente Vienne et Saâne (8)	0–3	SU Dives-Cabourg (5)

=== Fifth round ===
These matches were played on 17 and 18 October 2020.

Fifth round results: Normandy
Tie no	Home team (tier)	Score	Away team (tier)
1.	ES Pointe Hague (7)	0–4	FC Flers (6)
2.	ASPTT Caen (6)	1–2	ESFC Falaise (7)
3.	FC Troarn (8)	1–4	US Avranches (3)
4.	AS Ifs (7)	1–4	AG Caennaise (5)
5.	Jeunesse Fertoise Bagnoles (7)	0–2	US Ouest Cotentin (7)
6.	US Alençon (5)	0–1	AF Virois (5)
7.	AS Tourlaville (6)	0–0 (3–4 p)	FC Saint-Lô Manche (5)
8.	AS Val de Reuil-Vaudreuil-Poses (7)	1–0	US Bolbec (7)
9.	CA Pont-Audemer (8)	1–2	Olympique Pavillais (6)
10.	US Luneraysienne (7)	1–2	Évreux FC 27 (5)
11.	Romilly Pont-Saint-Pierre FC (5)	0–1	FC Rouen (4)
12.	SU Dives-Cabourg (5)	1–5	US Quevilly-Rouen (3)
13.	Le Havre Caucriauville Sportif (8)	2–5	FC Gisors Vexin Normand (6)
14.	ESM Gonfreville (6)	1–0	AS Villers Houlgate Côte Fleurie (7)

=== Sixth round ===
These matches were played on 30 and 31 January 2021.

Sixth round results: Normandy
Tie no	Home team (tier)	Score	Away team (tier)
1.	Olympique Pavillais (6)	0–6	US Quevilly-Rouen (3)
2.	Évreux FC 27 (5)	0–2	US Avranches (3)
3.	FC Flers (6)	0–3 (Note: FC Flers forfeited the tie, stating they would not play under the current conditions relating to COVID 19.)	FC Rouen (4)
4.	FC Saint-Lô Manche (5)	1–3	AF Virois (5)
5.	FC Gisors Vexin Normand (6)	0–1	ESM Gonfreville (6)
6.	US Ouest Cotentin (7)	0–1	ESFC Falaise (7)
7.	AS Val de Reuil-Vaudreuil-Poses (7)	1–7	AG Caennaise (5)
