= Dopud =

Dopud is a surname. Notable people with the surname include:

- Boško Dopuđ (born 1990), Serbian footballer
- Mike Dopud, Canadian actor, stuntman, and athlete
