= Sofiane Bezzou =

Algerian former footballer (born 1981)

Personal information
- Date of birth: May 8, 1981 (age 45)
- Place of birth: Rouen, France
- Height: 1.76 m (5 ft 9 1/2 in)
- Position: Midfielder

Youth career
- 1998–2000: Paris Saint-Germain

Senior career*
Years	Team	Apps	(Gls)
2000–2002	Nîmes Olympique	10	(0)
2002–2002	FUSC Bois-Guillaume		
2003–2006	Oissel		
2007–2010	Pacy Vallée-d'Eure	92	(12)
2010–2012	Fréjus Saint-Raphaël	25	(0)
2012–2017	Quevilly		

International career^{‡}
2002	Algeria U23		
- * Club domestic league appearances and goals as of 2 August 2012 ‡ National team caps and goals as of 21 August 2010

Sofiane Bezzou (born May 8, 1981) is a former professional football player who is currently playing for US Quevilly in the Championnat National. Born in France, he represented Algeria at youth level.

== Career ==
A product of the PSG Academy, he left the club at age 19 when he was not offered a professional contract. He then joined Nîmes Olympique who were playing in Ligue 2 but made just two appearances for the club. He spent the next few seasons bouncing around in the amateur leagues with FUSC Bois-Guillaume and CMS Oissel. In the summer of 2007, he joined Pacy Vallée-d'Eure. In November 2010, he moved to Fréjus Saint-Raphaël.

== International career ==
In 2002, Bezzou was called up to the Algerian Under-21 National Team.
