= Mohamed Lekkak =

Algerian footballer and manager (1937–2025)

Personal information
- Date of birth: 2 June 1937
- Place of birth: Tefeschoun, French Algeria
- Date of death: December 2025 (aged 88)
- Place of death: Granville, France
- Height: 1.68 m (5 ft 6 in)
- Position: Winger

Senior career*
Years	Team	Apps	(Gls)
1957–1958	Limoges Football		
1958–1960	Toulouse FC	5	(1)
1960–1962	US Albi		
1962–1963	Toulouse FC	1	(0)
1963–1965	AS Cherbourg	53	(19)
1965	Toulouse FC	6	(0)
1965–1967	FC Rouen	74	(26)
1967–1969	Lyon	61	(17)
1969–1970	Angoulême	12	(0)
1970–1971	CS Alençon		
1971–1972	Caen	7	(1)

International career
1964–1969	Algeria	4	(1)

Managerial career
- 1969–1970: Angoulême
- 1970–1971: CS Alençon
- 1979–1981: UES Montmorillon
- 1982–1983: Calais RUFC
- 1983: Angoulême
- 1984–1985: GCM
- 1987–1991: AAJ Blois
- 2000: CS Alençon
- 2003–2004: GCM
- 2006: WAT
- 2006–2007: MC Oran
- * Club domestic league appearances and goals

Mohamed Lekkak (Arabic: محمد لقاك; 2 June 1937 – December 2025) was an Algerian football player and manager who played as a winger.

Lekkak played for several clubs in France and coached clubs in both France and Algeria. He also made four appearances for the Algeria national team, scoring one goal.

Lekkak died in Granville in December 2025, at the age of 88.
