= Emmanuel Hutteau =

French footballer (born 1968)

Personal information
- Date of birth: 10 August 1968 (age 58)
- Place of birth: Blois, France
- Height: 1.75 m (5 ft 9 in)
- Position: Defender

Youth career
- INF Vichy

Senior career*
Years	Team	Apps	(Gls)
1987–1988	Clairefontaine		
1988–1990	Strasbourg		
1990–1992	FC Bourges		
1992–1993	Lens	8	(0)
1993–1995	Sedan	72	(10)
1995–1996	Cannes	12	(0)
1996–1997	Le Mans	13	(0)
1997–1998	US Créteil		
1998–2000	Angers		
2001	Red Star		
2001–2002	Rouen		
2002–2004	FUSC Bois-Guillaume		
- * Club domestic league appearances and goals

Emmanuel Hutteau (born 10 August 1968) is a French former professional footballer who played as a defender.
