= Christophe Ferron =

French footballer (born 1970)

Personal information
- Date of birth: 27 October 1970 (age 56)
- Place of birth: Le Mans, France
- Height: 1.80 m (5 ft 11 in)
- Position: Centre-back

Senior career*
Years	Team	Apps	(Gls)
1990–1999	Laval	288	(2)
1999–2003	Lorient	117	(0)
2003–2005	Laval	27	(0)
2005–2006	Alençon		

Managerial career
- 2005–2006: Alençon
- 2006–2007: Mayenne
- 2007–2011: Alençon
- 2011–2013: La Vitréenne
- 2016–2018: Le Mans B
- * Club domestic league appearances and goals

Christophe Ferron (born 27 October 1970) is a French football manager and former professional player who played as a centre-back. During a 15-year professional career, Ferron made a total of 432 league appearances for Laval and Lorient. He was also a sports instructor at a prison in Condé-sur-Sarthe.
