= Aldo Angoula =

French footballer (born 1981)

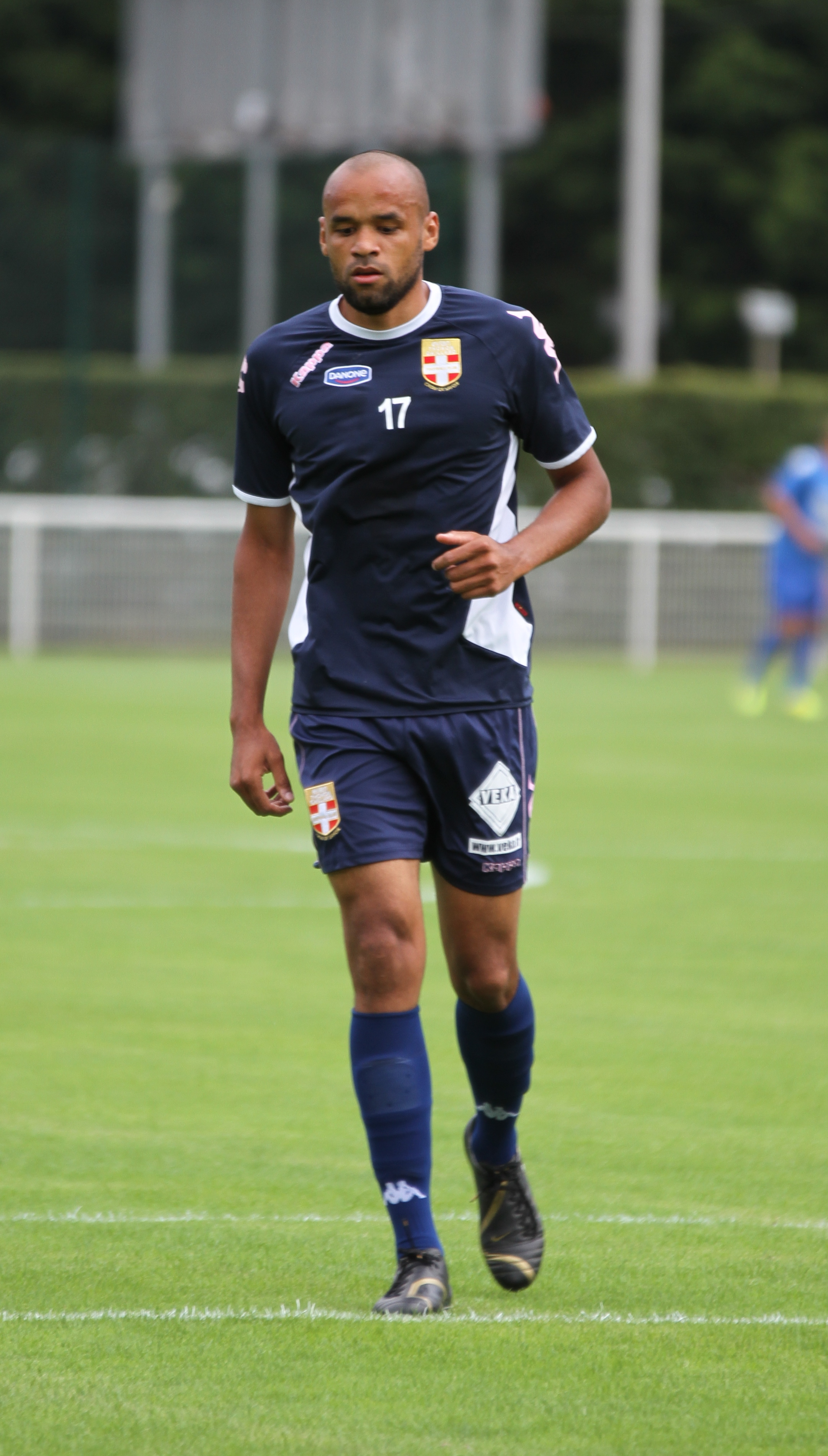
- Angoula with Évian Thonon Gaillard FC in 2011

Personal information
- Date of birth: 4 May 1981 (age 45)
- Place of birth: Le Havre, France
- Height: 1.84 m (6 ft 0 in)
- Position: Centre-back

Youth career
- 1989–1997: Tréfileries Le Havre
- 1997–2001: Le Havre

Senior career*
Years	Team	Apps	(Gls)
2001–2004	Fécamp		
2004–2005	GCO Bihorel		
2005–2007	FUSC Bois-Guillaume	54	(5)
2007–2009	Boulogne	13	(0)
2009–2016	Évian	143	(15)
2016–2019	Châteauroux	40	(4)
- * Club domestic league appearances and goals

Aldo Angoula (born 4 May 1981) is a French former professional footballer who played as a centre-back.

== Career ==
Born in Le Havre, Angoula began his career at Championnat de France Amateurs side FUSC Bois-Guillaume, in 2007 he joined Ligue 2 side US Boulogne, in December 2008 left the club and moved to Croix de Savoie Gaillard.

Angoula retired at the end of the 2018–19 season.

== Personal life ==
Angoula was born in France to a Cameroonian father. His brother Gaël played from 2005 to 2007 with him by FUSC Bois-Guillaume.
