= Nicolas Sachy =

French footballer (born 1967)

Personal information
- Date of birth: 23 October 1967 (age 59)
- Place of birth: Dunkirk, France
- Height: 1.83 m (6 ft 0 in)
- Position: Goalkeeper

Senior career*
Years	Team	Apps	(Gls)
1985–1986	Alençon		
1986–1993	Dunkerque	134	(0)
1993–1996	Angers	36	(0)
1996–2002	Sedan	111+ (Note: Statistics are missing for the 1996–97 and 1997–98 seasons.)	(0+)
Total		281+	(0+)
- * Club domestic league appearances and goals

Nicolas Sachy (born 23 October 1967) is a French former professional footballer who played as a goalkeeper. In his career, he played for Alençon, Dunkerque, Angers, and Sedan.

== Post-playing career ==
From 2002 to 2013, Sachy was a communication director at his former club Sedan. In October 2014, he became the manager of Le Rétro, a bar in Charleville-Mézières.

== Personal life ==
Nicolas is from a family of footballers; his father Lionel and his brother Laurent are both former footballers.

== Honours ==
Sedan

- Coupe de France runner-up: 1998–99
