= Melvin Bachelet =

French footballer (born 2003)

Personal information
- Date of birth: 23 May 2003 (age 23)
- Place of birth: Le Havre, France
- Height: 1.85 m (6 ft 1 in)
- Position: Defender

Team information
- Current team: Beauvais
- Number: 23

Youth career
- Le Havre

Senior career*
Years	Team	Apps	(Gls)
2020–2021	Le Havre	1	(0)
2021–2023	Le Havre II	16	(1)
2023–2024	Vire	23	(1)
2024–	Beauvais	7	(0)
- * Club domestic league appearances and goals as of 16 November 2024

Melvin Bachelet (born 23 May 2003) is a French professional football player who plays for Championnat National 1 club Beauvais.

== Club career ==
Melvin Bachelet is a graduate of the Le Havre AC academy, where he was one of the most highly regarded U17.

He made his professional debut for Le Havre on the 15 May 2021, during the Ligue 2 3-2 home win against the league champions of ESTAC Troyes, debuting the game as a left-back.
