= Jean-Paul Mendy (footballer) =

French footballer (born 1982)

Personal information
- Full name: Jean-Paul Mendy
- Date of birth: 15 August 1982 (age 44)
- Place of birth: Évreux, France
- Height: 1.76 m (5 ft 9 in)
- Position: Midfielder

Team information
- Current team: Oissel

Senior career*
Years	Team	Apps	(Gls)
2009–2012	Rouen	107	(17)
2012–2015	Orléans	86	(9)
2015–2017	Quevilly-Rouen	49	(6)
2017–	Oissel	72	(8)
- * Club domestic league appearances and goals as of 13:27, 22 May 2020 (UTC) ‡ National team caps and goals as of 2 August 2017

Jean-Paul Mendy (born 15 August 1982), is a French professional footballer who plays for Oissel as a midfielder.

== Professional career ==
Mendy spent most of his career in the lower divisions of France, but briefly played professional football with US Orléans in the Ligue 2. He made his professional debut in a 2–0 loss to Valenciennes FC on 26 September 2014.

== International career ==
Born in France and of Bissau-Guinean descent, Mendy was called up to the Guinea-Bissau national football team for the 2017 Africa Cup of Nations, but failed to make the final team.
