= Pavle Dolezar =

Serbian footballer (born 1944)

Personal information
- Date of birth: 1 May 1944 (age 82)
- Place of birth: Bačka Palanka, Yugoslavia
- Position: Midfielder

Youth career
- Bačka Bačka Palanka
- Slavija Novi Sad

Senior career*
Years	Team	Apps	(Gls)
1963–1966	Bačka Palanka		
1967–1968	Proleter Zrenjanin	57	(1)
1969	Paris-Neuilly	23	(0)
1969–1970	Heracles		
1970–1971	AGOVV		
1971–1972	Go Ahead Eagles	5	(0)
1972–1973	Heerenveen	25	(0)
1973–1974	Charleroi	5	(0)
1974–1978	Cholet	93	(1)
1978–1981	US Alençon	4	(0)

Managerial career
- 1977–1978: SO Cholet
- 1985–1986: Béziers
- 1997–1999: Kaizer Chiefs
- 1999–2001: Mamelodi Sundowns
- 2002: Sharjah
- 2004: Mamelodi Sundowns
- 2005–2006: Bloemfontein Celtic
- 2008: Black Leopards
- 2010–2011: Mpumalanga Black Aces
- * Club domestic league appearances and goals

Pavle Dolezar (Serbian Cyrillic: Павле Долезар; born 1 May 1944), also known as Paul Dolezar, is a Serbian-French football manager and former professional footballer who used to play as a midfielder.

== Playing career ==
Born in Bačka Palanka, SR Serbia, back then part of Yugoslavia, he began his youth career playing with Bačka Bačka Palanka and OFK Slavija Novi Sad. He debuted as senior in 1963 playing with Bačka Bačka Palanka in Yugoslav Second League until the winter break of the 1966–67 season when he was brought by one of back then dominant clubs in the region of Vojvodina, Proleter Zrenjanin. In the season he joined Proleter, the club achieved promotion to the Yugoslav First League and Dolezar played with Proleter in the Yugoslav highest level in the seasons 1967–68 and 1968–69.

He then moved abroad and played with Paris-Neuilly, Heracles Almelo, AGOVV, Go Ahead Eagles, SC Heerenveen, R. Charleroi S.C., SO Cholet and US Alençon.

== Managerial career ==
After retiring as a footballer he became a manager and coached Neuilly-sur-Seine, SO Cholet and Béziers in France. He also managed Tunisian side AS Gabès before moving to South Africa.

In 1997 and 1998, he led the Kaizer Chief's to the Rothmans Cup title. He was sacked as manager of the Chiefs in June 1999 and was appointed as manager of Sundowns in July 1999. In 1999, he won the Rothmans Cup title again with Mamelodi Sundowns in a final against Free State Stars. After the Rothmans cup win, he went on to win the 1999 PSL Castle league with Mamelodi Sundowns. In 2005, Dolezar remarkably won the SAA Super 8 cup with Bloemfontein Celtic. It had been 20 years since Bloemfontein Celtic won silverware
