= Gaël Angoula =

French footballer (born 1982)

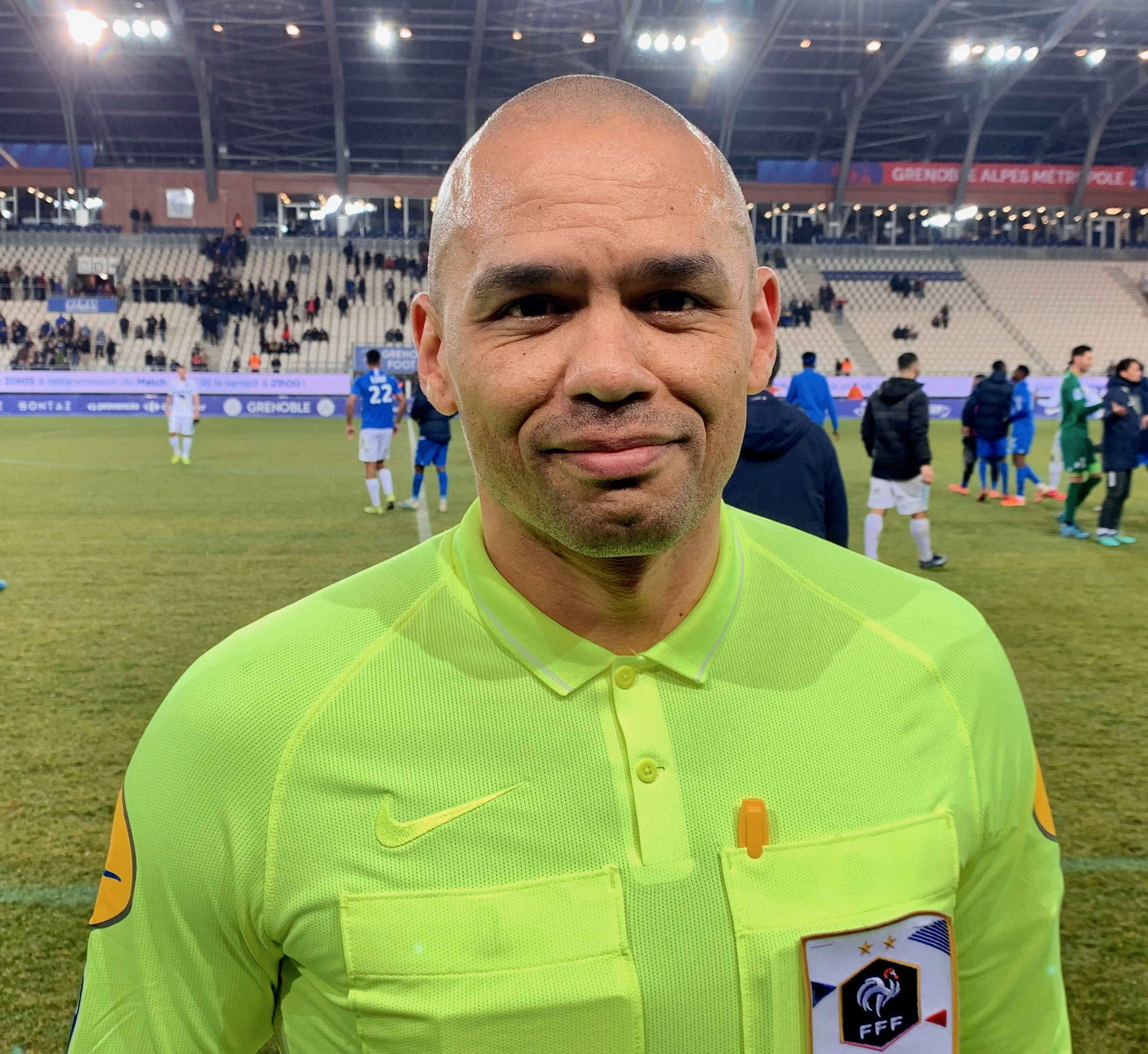
- Angoula refereeing in 2020

Personal information
- Date of birth: 18 July 1982 (age 44)
- Place of birth: Le Havre, France
- Height: 1.77 m (5 ft 10 in)
- Position: Defender

Senior career*
| Years | Team | Apps | (Gls) |
| 2004–2007 | Bois-Guillaume | 72 | (5) |
| 2007–2008 | Dunkerque | 24 | (1) |
| 2008–2010 | Pacy-sur-Eure | 64 | (3) |
| 2010–2013 | Bastia | 78 | (0) |
| 2012 | Bastia II | 1 | (0) |
| 2013–2016 | Angers | 60 | (1) |
| 2013–2016 | Angers II | 9 | (0) |
| 2016–2017 | Nîmes | 23 | (0) |
| 2017 | Nîmes II | 23 | (0) |
| Total | | 354 | (10) |
- * Club domestic league appearances and goals

Gaël Angoula (born 18 July 1982) is a French former professional footballer who played as a defender. He is now a referee. His brother, Aldo Angoula, is also a professional football player.

He holds both French and Cameroonian nationalities.
