= Solomon Morris =

Sierra Leonean footballer

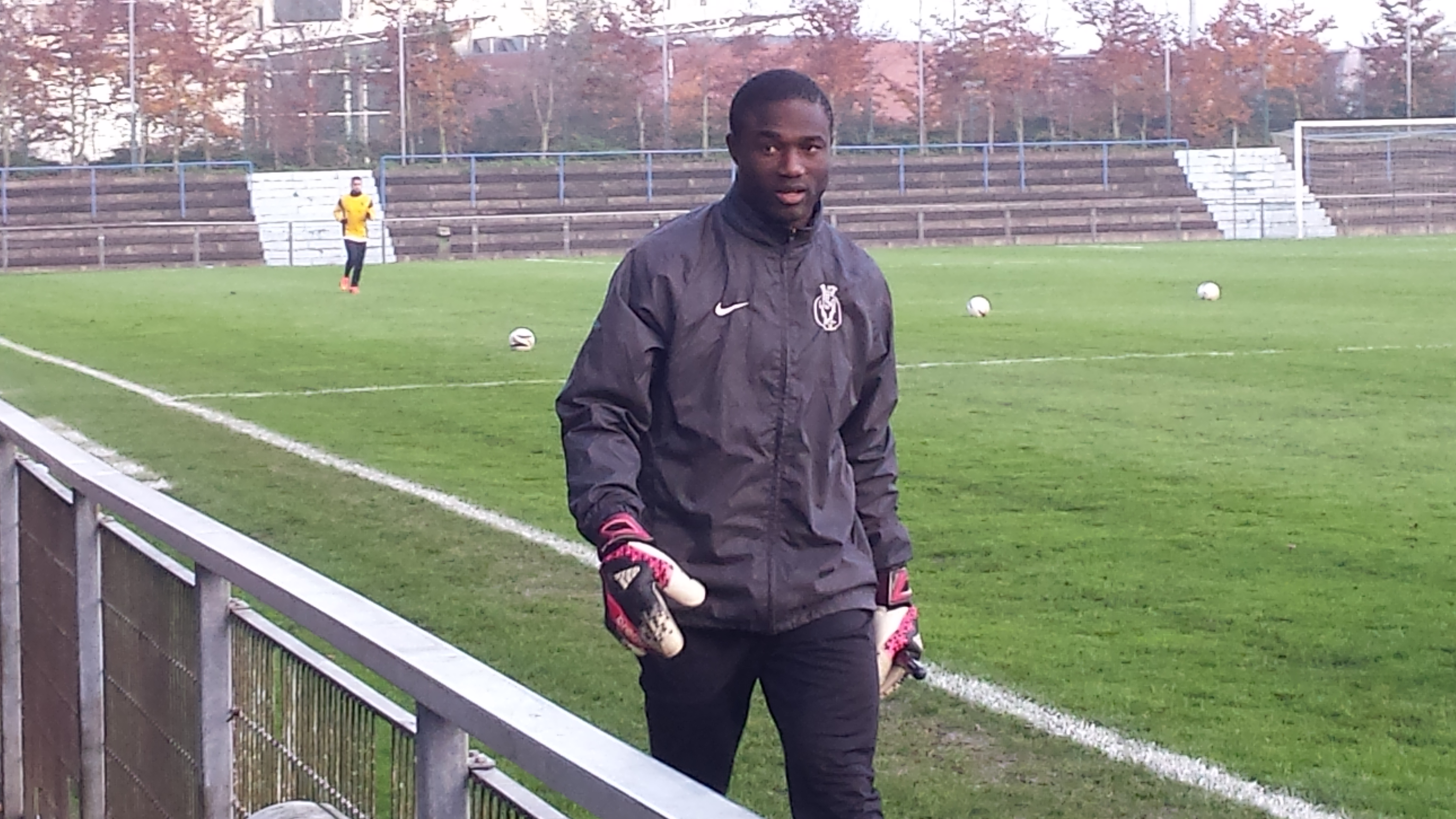
- Morris with Quevilly in 2014

Personal information
- Full name: Solomon Zombo Morris
- Date of birth: 16 June 1990 (age 36)
- Place of birth: Freetown, Sierra Leone
- Height: 1.80 m (5 ft 11 in)
- Position: Goalkeeper

Youth career
- 2008–2012: Rouen

Senior career*
Years	Team	Apps	(Gls)
2011–2013	Rouen	37	(0)
2013–2017	Quevilly	54	(1)
2017–2018	Dieppe	8	(0)
2018–2019	Toulouse Rodéo	25	(0)
2019–2022	Bois-Guillaume		
2022–	Solidarité-Scolaire		

International career
2013–2019	Sierra Leone	22	(0)
- * Club domestic league appearances and goals

Solomon Zombo Morris (born 16 June 1990) is a Sierra Leonean footballer who plays as a goalkeeper.

== Career ==
Morris was born in Freetown. He was called up for the first time in Sierra Leone's 2013 Africa Cup of Nations qualification match against Tunisia.

In the summer 2019, Morris joined French club FUSC Bois-Guillaume.
