= Pascal Vaudequin =

French footballer (born 1966)

Personal information
- Date of birth: 22 September 1966 (age 60)
- Place of birth: Bobigny, Île de France, France
- Position: Full-back

Senior career*
Years	Team	Apps	(Gls)
1985–1986	USL Dunkerque	3	(0)
1986–1987	US Alençon		(?)
1987–1991	Derry City		(?)
1991–1993	Rodez AF	52	(0)
1993–1996	Derry City	74	(1)
1996–1997	Shelbourne	35	(0)
1997–1999	Finn Harps	52	(1)
1999–2000	Bohemians	7	(0)
2000–2002	Shamrock Rovers	24	(1)

Managerial career
- 2005: Institute
- * Club domestic league appearances and goals

Pascal Vaudequin (born 22 September 1966) is a French former footballer who spent the most part of his career playing in the League of Ireland and working with the Irish Football Association for over a decade. Pascal is currently working as a Director in Vietnam for Juventus.

== Playing career ==
Vaudequin was born in Paris. He began playing football as a young boy after being inspired by the Netherlands national team and Johann Cruijff during the 1974 FIFA World Cup. He began his career with INF Vichy the National Football Academy before going to US Alençon with Philippe Troussier. In 1985, he joined USL Dunkerque before moving to Ireland in the summer of 1987 to sign for Derry City. He made his League of Ireland debut for the Candystripes on 13 September against Bray Wanderers. Vaudequin was pivotal in the hugely successful treble winning Derry City team of 1989. He later left in 1991, returning to France to play for Orléans Rodez before re-signing for Derry in 1993 where he stayed for a further three seasons. During his two spells at Derry he won one League of Ireland title, two FAI Cups and four League Cups in what proved to be the Candystripes' most successful era. Whilst playing for Derry, Vaudequin was referred to as "Paddy Quinn" or "Paddy Vandequin" by supporters, who found difficulty in pronouncing his name.

Vaudequin left Derry City in 1997 and signed with the relatively successful Shelbourne. During his short spell with the Dublin side, he won an FAI Cup winners medal in 1997. Pascal then signed for Finn Harps getting to another FAI Cup final in 1999. He then moved to Bohemians, making his debut against Sligo Rovers in January 2000. However, this move was short-lived and Vaudequin promptly signed for Shamrock Rovers spending the 2000–01 and the 2001/02 seasons with them.

== Managerial and coaching career ==
After holding various coaching positions around Ireland, Vaudequin was determined to become an official coach and returned home to France, where he completed his UEFA Pro Licence. Since gaining the licence, Vaudequin has been linked with a number of top-flight Irish jobs.

Upon retirement, Vaudequin returned to the North-West and assumed the role of assistant manager at Finn Harps. After a period as assistant manager at Finn Harps, Vaudequin began coaching at Institute. He was later offered the role of manager of Institute in January 2005 after the departure of Paul Hegarty. He accepted this offer and signed a number of promising French players, but his managerial reign lasted a mere ten months. After leaving the Riverside club, he decided to aid youth development and volunteered as a youth coach for Derry based Trojans. Vaudequin had also been linked with the vacant post at Finn Harps after Anthony Gorman left the club at the end of the 2006 league campaign. However, he did not take the job and his former team-mate, Paul Hegarty, was soon appointed manager. In March 2007, Vaudequin was also strongly linked with the job of Sligo Rovers

Vaudequin coached for the Irish Football Association from 2007 to 2018. He was involved as a County Coach Performance (u12- u15) until 2013. Pascal was involved with the N-Ireland u17 International Coaching staff as an assistant manager until June 2011. From February 2014 to July 2018 he was involved as an elite performance coach at under-14 to under-16 level, also working with the under-19 international squad as an assistant manager. In June 2018 to 2020 Pascal Vaudequin was appointed Assistant Technical Director to Philippe Troussier in Vietnam National football center PVF. in 2019 Pascal Vaudequin was involved in partnership between the PVF Ha Tinh FC regarding an academy project started as a grassroots initiative & developed into one of the main youth professional structures in Vietnam. A $10 million project was implemented in the poorest province of Vietnam to develop youth football and improving the existing infrastructure. Coaching Education was achieved statistically involving 420 educational institutions & 80 club coaches from within the Ha Tinh province. In January 2021 to August 2021 was appointed as a General Director of the Juventus Professional Academy in Ba-Ria Vung Tau Vietnam, the COVID-19 situation deteriorated and the closure of all sporting activities was implemented. Pascal Vaudequin currently holds two key positions at Neuchâtel Xamax: Talent Manager and Head Coach for the U17 (M17) team at the Xamax Academy. He took up these roles in July 2023.

== Honours ==
Derry City

- League of Ireland – 1
- FAI Cup – 2
- League of Ireland Cup – 4

Shelbourne

- FAI Cup – 1
