= Robin Legendre =

French footballer (born 2002)

Personal information
- Date of birth: 3 April 2002 (age 24)
- Place of birth: Rennes, France
- Height: 1.88 m (6 ft 2 in)
- Position: Forward

Team information
- Current team: Orléans
- Number: 19

Youth career
- –2021: Caen

Senior career*
Years	Team	Apps	(Gls)
2019–2022	Caen B	37	(5)
2021	Caen	0	(0)
2022–2023	Brest B	25	(10)
2023–2024	Quevilly-Rouen	8	(0)
2023–2024	Quevilly-Rouen B	22	(3)
2024–2025	Vire	21	(3)
2025–2026	Bayonne	14	(6)
2026–	Orléans	12	(1)
- * Club domestic league appearances and goals as of 23 June 2026

Robin Legendre (born 3 April 2002) is a French professional footballer who plays as a forward for Ligue 3 club Orléans.

== Career ==
Legendre is a graduate of the Caen academy. He made his professional debut for the club in a Coupe de France match against Dinan Léhon on 13 November 2021. He left Caen in 2022 to join Brest, where he would play for the reserve team. In 2023, Legendre signed for Quevilly-Rouen. He made his debut in a 2–0 Ligue 2 defeat at home to Ajaccio.

== Career statistics ==
As of match played 12 April 2025

Appearances and goals by club, season and competition
Club	Season	League			Cup		Total	
Club	Season	Division	Apps	Goals	Apps	Goals	Apps	Goals
Caen B	2019–20	National 3	8	0	—		8	0
Caen B	2020–21	National 2	5	0	—		5	0
Caen B	2021–22	National 2	24	5	—		24	5
Caen B			37	5	—		37	5
Caen	2021–22	Ligue 2	0	0	1	0	1	0
Brest B	2022–23	National 3	25	10	—		25	10
Quevilly-Rouen	2023–24	Ligue 2	8	0	3	0	11	0
Quevilly-Rouen B	2023–24	National 3	22	3	—		22	3
Vire	2024–25	National 3	17	2	0	0	17	2
Career total			109	18	4	0	113	18
