= Boško Dopuđ =

Serbian footballer

Personal information
- Full name: Boško Dopuđ
- Date of birth: 9 December 1990 (age 35)
- Place of birth: Zadar, SR Croatia, SFR Yugoslavia
- Height: 1.86 m (6 ft 1 in)
- Position: Centre-back

Team information
- Current team: Francavilla

Senior career*
Years	Team	Apps	(Gls)
2009–2011	Mornar Bar	28	(0)
2011–2013	Metalac GM	34	(1)
2014	BSK Borča	23	(1)
2015–2018	Metalac GM	45	(1)
2018–2020	Oissel	36	(1)
2020–	Francavilla	35	(1)
- * Club domestic league appearances and goals as of 20:39, 27 February 2023 (UTC)

Boško Dopuđ (Serbian Cyrillic: Бошко Допуђ; born 9 December 1990) is a Serbian football who plays as a centre-back for Italia Serie D club Francavilla.
