= AF Virois =

French football club

Virois
- Full name: Association Football Virois
- Founded: 1962
- Ground: Stade Pierre-Compte, Vire Normandie
- Chairman: Christophe Lécuyer
- Manager: Cédric Hoarau
- League: National 3 Group C
- 2023–24: National 2 Group C, 13th of 14 (relegated)

Association Football Virois, known as AF Virois or Vire, is a French football club based in Vire Normandie, Calvados. It was founded in 1962. The club currently plays in the Championnat National 3, the fifth tier of the French football league system.

== History ==
The club was founded in 1962 from the merger between ES Vire and AC Vire as a section of the sports club USM Viroise.

In 1997 the club separated from the multi sports club and renamed themselves FCM Vire.

In 2002 the club then merged with Club de foot de Saint-Martin-de-Tallevende becoming AF Virois.

On 7 January 2023, Virois, while playing in the fifth-tier of French football, competed against Ligue 1 side FC Nantes in Coupe de France, losing 2–0. The same season the team won the 2022–23 Championnat National 3, Group J, winning promotion to the 2023–24 Championnat National 2.

== Ground ==
The club play their home games at the Stade Pierre-Compte. The stadium was built in 1940 and was named after a local businessman who was chairman and CEO of Société générale d'équipement.

== Honours ==
- Championnat National 3 Group J - Champions (1) 2022-23
- Division d'honneur - Champions (1) 1991-92

== Notable Players ==
- (France) Pierre Bourdin
- (France) Melvin Bachelet
- (France) Robin Legendre
