= FUSC Bois-Guillaume =

French football club

- Full name: Football Union Sportive et Culturelle Bois-Guillaume
- Founded: 1965
- Ground: Parc des Cosmonautes, Bois-Guillaume
- Capacity: 2.000
- Chairman: Patrick Étienne
- Manager: Christophe Canteloup
- League: D.H. Normandie
Home colours

FUSC Bois-Guillaume (French: Football Union Sportive et Culturelle Bois-Guillaume) is a French football club based in Bois-Guillaume (Seine-Maritime).The colours of the club are green and white.

== History ==
It was founded in 1965. The club played in the departmental and regional leagues until the end of the 1996-97 season when finishing second were promoted to the CFA2. The club stayed at this level for 11 seasons before being relegated back to the Regional leagues where they have remained since.

== Stadium ==
They play at the Parc des Cosmonautes, which has a capacity of 2,000.

== Honours ==
- PH Normandie(1) Champion : 1985-86
- DHR Normandie(1) Champion : 1988-89
- DH Normandie Vice-champion : 1996-97
- Coupe de Normandie (2) Champion : 2003-04, 2005-06
- Regional 3 Normandie group F (1) Champion : 2024-25

== Notable players ==
- (Sierra Leone) Solomon Morris
- (France) Aldo Angoula
- (France) Sofiane Bezzou
- (France) Joris Colinet
- (France) Gaël Angoula
- (France) Tristan Lahaye
- (France) Emmanuel Hutteau
