= US Alençon =

French football club

- Full name: Union Sportive Alençonnaise 61
- Founded: 1916
- Ground: Stade Jacques Fould, Alençon
- Capacity: 4,000
- Chairman: Christian Lair
- Manager: Christophe Ferron
- League: Championnat National 2 Group B
- 2025–26: National 3 Group c, 10th
Home colours

Union Sportive Alençonnaise 61 is a French association football club founded in 1916. They are based in the town of Alençon. As of the 2018–19 season, they play in the Championnat National 3.

== History ==
The club was established during the First World War in 1917 by pupils from the local teacher training college as part of a multi sports club called Club Sportif Alençonnais (CS Alençon). It spent the vast majority of its early decades navigating regional French amateur football leagues. In 1990 the club left the multi sports club and operated as Football Club Alençonnais.

Following a dissolution and restructure, the club officially took on its modern identity, Union Sportive Alençonnaise, in 1994.

The club has consistently competed in the Championnat National 3 (the fifth tier of the French football league system).

== Current squad ==
As of 29 March 2019

Note: Flags indicate national team as defined under FIFA eligibility rules; some limited exceptions apply. Players may hold more than one non-FIFA nationality.

No.	Pos.	Nation	Player
—	GK	FRA	Benjamin Couillard
—	GK	FRA	Gaëtan Boisroux
—	GK	FRA	Aymeric Gaignon
—	DF	FRA	Tony Hiaumet
—	DF	FRA	Mamadou Camara
—	DF	COD	Trésor Luntala
—	DF	FRA	Karim El Hamdaoui
—	DF	FRA	Nathan Illand
—	DF	FRA	Matthis Barteau
—	DF	FRA	Said Abousaid
—	DF	FRA	Mael Rallu
—	MF	FRA	Kevin Perrot
—	MF	FRA	Christophe Juin
—	MF	FRA	Hakim Khadrejnane

No.	Pos.	Nation	Player
—	MF	FRA	Morgan Hardoin
—	MF	FRA	Maxime Lepinay
—	MF	FRA	Simon Pelleray
—	MF	FRA	Théo Bisson
—	MF	FRA	Antonin Maloisel
—	MF	FRA	Merdi MBobilelo
—	FW	FRA	Amaury Tessier
—	FW	FRA	Hakim El Hamdaoui
—	FW	FRA	Souleymane Diarra
—	FW	KOS	Lirim Mazreku
—	FW	TUR	Sinan Ergun
—	FW	CMR	Alain Etamé

== Home ground ==
The club play their home games in Stade Jacques Fould.

The stadium was inaugurated in May 1947. In 1949 the ground was named after Jacques ACHILLE-FOULD, former president of the Club Sportif Alençonnais who purchased the land in 1929 and was also a former mayor of Condé-sur-Sarthe.

The stadium became owned City of Alençon by virtue of a resolution of the municipal council in 1980.

The stadium currently has a capacity for 4,000 spectators, consisting of a 1,500 seated stand and standing room for a further 2,500.

== Honours ==
- Division 4 (2) 1979-80, 1981-82
- Ligue Normandie (1) 1952-53
- DH Basse-Normandie (1) 2004-05
- Coupe de Normandie (2) 1958-59, 1968-69
- Coupe de Basse-Normandie (1) 2010-11

== Former players ==
- (France) Pascal Vaudequin
- (France) Benjamin Morel
- (France) Christophe Ferron
- (Algeria) Mohamed Lekkak
- (Socialist Federal Republic of Yugoslavia) Pavle Dolezar
- (France) Gaëtan Laura
- (France) Kévin Schur
- (France) Nicolas Sachy
- (Democratic Republic of the Congo) Trésor Luntala

== Notable Former Managers ==
- (Algeria) Mohamed Lekkak
- (France) Philippe Troussier
- (France) Bruno Mignot
