= CMS Oissel =

French football club

Oissel
- Full name: Club Municipal Sportif d'Oissel
- Founded: 1920
- Ground: Stade Marcel Billard, Oissel
- Capacity: 4,000
- Chairman: Charles Maarek
- Manager: Eric Fouda
- League: National 3 Group F
- 2022–23: National 3 Group J 8th
- Website: https://cms-oissel.fr
Home colours	Away colours

Club Municipal Sportif d'Oissel is a French sports club founded in 1968. The club is based in Oissel, Seine-Maritime and have teams for basketball, handball and association football. As of the 2020–21 season, their football team plays in the Championnat National 3. A number of notable footballers have played for the club, including Matthieu Louis-Jean and Grégory Tafforeau.

== History ==
The club was formed in 1920 as part of the Club Athlétique d'Oissel.The club in 1958 won the Haute Normandie first division.

In 1968 under the presidency of Marcel Billard, the club changed its name to Club Municipal Sportif d'Oissel (CMSO). The club spent its time in the regional and departmental leagues until the end of the 1991-92 season when they won the Division d'Honneur, and got promoted to Division 4, but only lasted a season before being relegated again.

After gaining promotion from the Division d'Honneur again to the CFA2 at the end of the 1997-98 campaign, the club found it self back in the Division d'Honneur a single season later. what followed was another Division d'Honneur title, followed by two more seasons in the CFA 2, with their third Division d'Honneur title and promotion in 2002-03.

The club spent teh next fifteen seasons at the CFA 2/National 3 level, before winning the National 3 title in 2017-18. After spending two seasons in National 2, the club was relegated back to National 3 where they have remained since.

== Stadium ==
Their home stadium is the Stade Marcel Billard in the town, which has a capacity of 4,000 spectators.

== Current squad ==
As of 16 October 2018.

Note: Flags indicate national team as defined under FIFA eligibility rules; some limited exceptions apply. Players may hold more than one non-FIFA nationality.

No.	Pos.	Nation	Player
—	GK	FRA	Issa Coulibaly
—	GK	ALG	Aiyoub Belabes
—	GK	FRA	Cedou Nlandu
—	DF	FRA	Jacques-Antoine Pelletier
—	DF	SRB	Boško Dopuđ
—	DF	FRA	Alsseny Cissoko
—	DF	FRA	Charles Houla
—	DF	FRA	Adil Benjeddi
—	DF	FRA	Kevin Mendy
—	MF	FRA	Mohamed Ouadah

No.	Pos.	Nation	Player
—	MF	FRA	Malik Abdelmoula
—	MF	FRA	Jean-Paul Mendy
—	MF	FRA	Farid Benzia
—	MF	FRA	Amadou Dia
—	MF	FRA	Ibrahim Dembélé
—	FW	BRA	Tiago Moura
—	FW	FRA	Thierry Lemaitre
—	FW	FRA	Sodiq Odumosu
—	FW	FRA	Sillemane Sene
—	FW	FRA	Christopher Mayulu
