= 2010–11 Coupe Gambardella =

Crédit Agricole Coupe Gambardella

Tournament details
- Country: France

Final positions
- Champions: AS Monaco
- Runners-up: Saint-Étienne

The 2010–11 Coupe Gambardella was the 56th edition of the French youth cup competition reserved for male under-19 football players. The competition was organized by the French Football Federation. The final was contested on 14 May 2011 and served as a curtain raiser for the 2011 Coupe de France Final. The defending champions were Metz, who defeated Sochaux 4–3 on penalties in last year's final. On 14 May, the under 19-team of AS Monaco defeated Saint-Étienne 4–3 on penalties in the 2011 Coupe Gambardella Final to win the Coupe Gambardella title. The title is the club's third in its history having won the title previously in 1962 and 1972

== Calendar ==
On 21 August 2010, the French Football Federation announced the calendar for the 2010–11 edition of the Coupe Gambardella.

Round	First match date	Fixtures	Clubs	Notes
Regional finals	21 November 2010			
First Round	12 December 2010			
Second Round	16 January 2011			
Round of 64	6 February 2011			
Round of 32	27 February 2011	16	32 → 16	
Round of 16	20 March 2011	8	16 → 8	
Quarter-finals	10 April 2011	4	8 → 4	
Semi-finals	1 May 2011	2	4 → 2	
Final	14 May 2011	1	2 → 1	Final at the Stade de France.

== Matches ==
=== First round ===
The draw for the first round of the Coupe Gambardella was held on 25 November 2010 at the headquarters of the French Football Federation and was conducted by Fernand Duchaussoy, the president of the federation, Henri Monteil, the general secretary of the federation, Jean-Claude Hazeaux, general secretary of the Ligue du Football Amateur (LFA), and Jean-Pierre Dubédat, a LFA member representing the National Federal Commission for Youth Competitions. The matches were played on 11–12 December. The matches that were canceled due to inclement weather were played on 8–9 January. The rescheduled match that was canceled was played on 12 January.

Tie no	Home team	Score	Away team
1	Nîmes Lassallien	3–0	Fabrègues
2	Hyères	4–0	Vergèze
3	Sète	1–2	Le Pontet
4	Saint-Laurent	7–0	Furiani-Agliani
5	Marignane	0–0 (a.e.t); 13–12 pen.	Eybens
6	Poulx	1–1 (a.e.t); 1–4 pen.	Beausoleil
7	Sisteron	0–1	Alès
8	Puget-sur-Argens	1–4	Cros-de-Cagnes
9	Martigues	1–3	Istres
10	Bergerac	1–1 (a.e.t); 1–3 pen.	Mérignac
11	Muret	1–0	Angoulême Leroy
12	Limoges	0–1	Rodez
13	Pau	3–0	Labrède
14	Toulouse Rodéo	1–1 (a.e.t); 4–5 pen.	Blagnac
15	Montauban	2–5	Mont-de-Marsan
16	Auterive	2–2 (a.e.t); 3–5 pen.	Haut Adour
17	Blanquefort	2–0	Bordelais
18	Brive	0–4	Tournefeuille
19	La Roche-sur-Yon	1–0	Blosne Rennes
20	Bouchemaine	3–3 (a.e.t); 1–4 pen.	Blois
21	Challans	3–2	La Châtaigneraie
22	Carquefou	2–0	Rezé
23	Villeneuve-les-Salines	2–0	Saint-Nazaire
24	Saint-Herblain	0–2	Poitiers
25	Atlantique Vilaine	1–1 (a.e.t); 3–4 pen.	Beaucouzé
26	Vertou	2–0	Dreux
27	Amilly	3–2	Orléans
28	Saint-Malo	2–0	Sablé-sur-Sarthe
29	Noyal Pontivy	4–1	Château-Gontier
30	Stade Pontivy	3–1	Avant Caen
31	Lamballe	0–2	Lannion
32	Plabennec	3–0	Ouistreham
33	ASPTT Caen	3–0	Mondeville
34	Saint-Grégoire	1–1 (a.e.t); 4–3 pen.	Concarneau
35	Vitré	3–1	Stade Mayenne
36	Quimper	1–2	Guécélard
37	Roncq	0–0 (a.e.t); 0–3 pen.	Hazebrouck

Tie no	Home team	Score	Away team
38	Dieppe	1–1 (a.e.t); 3–2 pen.	Marck
39	Les Lilas	1–1 (a.e.t); 2–4 pen.	Lillebonne
40	Grand-Synthe	0–3	Évreux
41	Boulogne-Billancourt	1–0	Villemomble
42	Saint-Leu	1–2	Quevilly
43	Fleury Mérogis	3–1	Caudebec
44	Roubaix	0–1	Saint-Ouen l'Aumône
45	Le Blanc-Mesnil	1–2	Ascq
46	Allonne	0–2	Saint-Denis
47	Billy Berclau	0–0 (a.e.t); 2–4 pen.	Tinqueux
48	Aulnoye	2–1	AC Amiens
49	Arras	0–1	ASPTT Chalons
50	Créil	1–2	Les Ulis
51	Drancy	2–1	Taissy
52	Maubeuge	1–5	Waziers
53	Hautmont	0–3	Villepinte
54	Le Mée	3–0	Choisy-au-Bac
55	Schirrhein	3–6	Schiltigheim
56	Chaumont	0–1	Vesoul
57	Homécourt	5–0	Neuves-Maisons
58	Wittelsheim	1–1 (a.e.t); 5–4 pen.	Haguenau
59	Trémery	1–1 (a.e.t); 1–3 pen.	Bar-le-Duc
60	Amicale Metz	0–2	Vauban Strasbourg
61	Pontarlier	3–0	Thionville
62	Forbach Marienau	1–2	Illzach Modenheim
63	Ernolsheim	0–4	Joigny
64	Chamalières	3–1	Annecy-le-Vieux
65	Rhodia	0–3	Montceau Bourgogne
66	Dommartin Tour	1–1 (a.e.t); 4–5 pen.	Gueugnon
67	Seyssinet	2–1	Champagnole
68	Brioude	1–1 (a.e.t); 5–3 pen.	Cluzes Scionzier
69	Jura Sud	2–0	Cournon-d'Auvergne
70	Millery Vourles	1–4	Évian
71	Caluire	3–0	Villefranche
72	Bourgoin	1–1 (a.e.t); 2–3 pen.	Le Puy
73	Moulins	0–3	Andrézieux

=== Second round ===
The draw for the second round of the Coupe Gambardella was held on 16 December at the headquarters of the French Football Federation and was conducted by Fernand Duchaussoy, the president of the federation and Guy Ferrier, a member of the Direction Technique Nationale. The matches were played on 15–16 January. The canceled matches were played on 19 January.

Tie no	Home team	Score	Away team
1	Lesquin	1–3	Amiens
2	Quevilly	0–0 (a.e.t); 1–4 pen.	Lens
3	Lillebonne	1–5	Boulogne-Billancourt
4	Fleury-Mérogis	0–0 (a.e.t); 1–2 pen.	Valenciennes
5	Hazebrouck	1–1 (a.e.t); 9–8 pen.	Saint-Ouen l'Aumône
6	Ascq	2–2 (a.e.t); 2–4 pen.	Wasquehal
7	Dieppe	0–2	Lille
8	Waziers	0–2	Boulogne
9	ASPTT Caen	1–4	Le Havre
10	Évreux	1–1 (a.e.t); 4–5 pen.	Lannion
11	Saint-Malo	1–2	Guingamp
12	Stade Pontivy	0–4	Caen
13	Plabennec	0–3	Rennes
14	Saint-Grégoire	2–3	Vitré
15	Laval	0–4	Le Mans
16	Noyal Pontivy	2–3	Racing Paris
17	Amilly	0–4	Paris Saint-Germain
18	Saint-Denis	3–0	Aulnoye
19	Joigny	0–5	Auxerre
20	Villepinte	1–1 (a.e.t); 5–4 pen.	Beauvais
21	Drancy	1–3	Paris
22	Les Ulis	1–4	Troyes
23	Tinqueux	2–5	Sedan
24	Le Mée	0–3	Stade Reims
25	ASPTT Chalons	5–1	Illzach Modenheim
26	Mulhouse	1–0	Strasbourg
27	Pontarlier	0–4	Nancy
28	Vauban Strasbourg	0–5	Sochaux
29	Vesoul	2–0	Amnéville
30	Wittelsheim	3–5	Schiltigheim
31	Homécourt	1–0	Bar-le-Duc
32	Épinal	0–1	Metz

Tie no	Home team	Score	Away team
33	Beaucouze	3–5	Châteauroux
34	Guécelard	2–0	Blois
35	Carquefou	0–1	Angers
36	Vertou	0–2	Nantes
37	Vannes	2–2 (a.e.t); 4–2 pen.	Niort
38	Poitiers	4–1	Villeneuve-les-Salines
39	Challans	0–6	Lorient
40	La Roche-sur-Yon	1–3	Brest
41	Andrézieux	0–1	Chamalières
42	Évian	1–3	Nîmes
43	Montceau Bourgogne	1–6	Grenoble
44	Lyon	2–1	Saint-Priest
45	Jura Sud	0–2	Montpellier
46	Le Puy	0–4	Saint-Étienne
47	Gueugnon	1–3	Seyssinet
48	Brioude	0–0 (a.e.t); 4–2 pen.	Caluire
49	Blagnac	1–1 (a.e.t); 9–10 pen.	Blanquefort
50	Mont-de-Marsan	0–1	Pau
51	Haut Adour	0–2	Tournefeuille
52	Libourne-Saint-Seurin	0–2	Colomiers
53	Muret	3–1	Villenave
54	Rodez	1–2	Toulouse
55	Mérignac	1–0	Limoges
56	Tarbes	0–2	Bordeaux
57	Saint-Laurent	4–2	Borgo
58	Hyères	2–1	Bastia
59	Cros-de-Cagnes	1–4	Marseille
60	Beausoleil	2–2 (a.e.t); 3–4 pen.	Le Pontet
61	Alès	0–5	Nice
62	Ajaccio	1–2	AS Monaco
63	Nîmes Lassallien	0–3	Cannes
64	Istres	5–0	Marignane

=== Round of 64 ===
The draw for the Round of 64 of the Coupe Gambardella was held on 20 January 2011 at the headquarters of the French Football Federation in Paris. The draw was conducted by Jean-Pierre Dubédat, a member of the Ligue du Football Amateur, and Alain Dessoly, a member of the Federal Youth Competition Committee. The matches were played on 5–7 February.

Tie no	Home team	Score	Away team
1	Hazebrouck	0–4	Valenciennes
2	Boulogne-Billancourt	0–3	Amiens
3	Guécelard	1–0	Lille
4	Lannion	2–4	Le Havre
5	Guingamp	4–3	Wasquehal
6	Boulogne	0–2	Rennes
7	Vitré	1–1 (a.e.t); 8–7 pen.	Villepinte
8	Caen	1–0	Lens
9	Schiltigheim	0–2	Sedan
10	Racing Paris	3–1	Mulhouse
11	Paris	6–2	Auxerre
12	Metz	4–1	Stade Reims
13	Saint-Denis	2–0	ASPTT Chalons
14	Homécourt	0–2	Vesoul
15	Paris Saint-Germain	1–0	Nancy
16	Troyes	1–0	Sochaux
17	Saint-Laurent	0–2	Nîmes

Tie no	Home team	Score	Away team
18	Seyssinet	0–7	Saint-Étienne
19	Hyères	1–1 (a.e.t); 4–5 pen.	Nice
20	Montpellier	3–0	Lyon
21	Cannes	1–1 (a.e.t); 4–5 pen.	Marseille
22	Chamalières	1–3	AS Monaco
23	Le Pontet	0–1	Istres
24	Brioude	0–5	Grenoble
25	Brest	0–1	Le Mans
26	Mérignac	3–1	Muret
27	Blanquefort	1–1 (a.e.t); 5–4 pen.	Angers
28	Bordeaux	3–0	Vannes
29	Châteauroux	1–1 (a.e.t); 1–3 pen.	Nantes
30	Lorient	1–0	Colomiers
31	Pau	1–0	Poitiers
32	Tournefeuille	0–2	Toulouse

=== Round of 32 ===
The draw for the Round of 32 of the Coupe Gambardella was held on 10 February 2011 at the headquarters of Crédit Agricole in Paris. The draw was conducted by the assistant coach of the France national team Alain Boghossian and the head coach of the France national under-17 team Patrick Gonfalone. The matches were played on 26–27 February 2011.

Tie no	Home team	Score	Away team
1	Vesoul	1–0	Saint-Denis
2	Le Havre	1–1 (a.e.t); 2–3 pen.	Sedan
3	Paris	1–1 (a.e.t); 4–1 pen.	Paris Saint-Germain
4	Guécelard	0–5	Troyes
5	Valenciennes	7–0	Racing Paris
6	Amiens	0–1	Metz
7	Mérignac	2–1	Le Mans
8	Nantes	0–4	Guingamp

Tie no	Home team	Score	Away team
9	Rennes	0–0 (a.e.t); 5–3 pen.	Caen
10	Blanquefort	3–3 (a.e.t); 4–2 pen.	Bordeaux
11	Vitré	0–1	Lorient
12	Saint-Étienne	2–0	Nîmes
13	Pau	0–1	Marseille
14	Istres	1–3	AS Monaco
15	Toulouse	2–2 (a.e.t); 2–3 pen.	Grenoble
16	Nice	0–2	Montpellier

=== Round of 16 ===
The draw for the Round of 16 of the Coupe Gambardella was held on 3 March 2011 at the headquarters of the French Football Federation in Paris. The draw was conducted by Jean Djorkaeff, the president of the Coupe de France Commission and Bernard Barbet, the president of the Ligue du Football Amateur. The matches were played on 16–20 March 2011.

Tie no	Home team	Score	Away team
1	Troyes	2–2 (a.e.t); 7–6 pen.	Valenciennes
2	Sedan	0–0 (a.e.t); 5–4 pen.	Metz
3	Lorient	0–0 (a.e.t); 3–2 pen.	Rennes

Tie no	Home team	Score	Away team
4	Vesoul	2–3	Guingamp
5	Montpellier	2–0	Paris
6	Blanquefort	0–6	AS Monaco
7	Mérignac	0–2	Marseille
8	Grenoble	0–1	Saint-Étienne

=== Quarterfinals ===
The draw for the quarterfinals of the Coupe Gambardella was held on 24 March 2011 at the headquarters of the French Football Federation in Paris. The draw was conducted by Eric Boucher and Pierre Ducasse. Boucher won the competition with Bordeaux in 1976, while Ducasse presently plays for the same club and participated in the competition in 2006. The matches were played on 6 and 10 April 2011.

6 April	Sedan	1–0	Lorient	Stade du Petit Bois, Charleville-Mézières
15:00 CEST	Biancone 10'	Report		Referee: Gauthier Leggeri

10 April	Montpellier	2–2 (4–5 p)	Troyes	Stade de Grammont, Montpellier
15:00 CEST	Cropanese 8', 61'	Report	Hama 6'; K. Camara 70'	Referee: Maxime Folliet

10 April	Marseille	2–5	Saint-Étienne	Stade Roger Lebert, Marseille
15:00 CEST	Ammari 13'; Abbes 58'	Report	Diomandé 7'; Saadi 25' (pen.), 27', 57'; Mahaya 37'	Referee: Faouzi Benchabane

10 April	Guingamp	2–4	AS Monaco	Stade du Roudourou, Guingamp
15:00 CEST	Alioui 5'; Pierre-Charles 15'	Report	Eysseric 34' (pen.), 84'; Pandor 50'; Carrasco 88'	Referee: Michel Yann Foquet

=== Semi-finals ===
The draw for the semi-finals of the Coupe Gambardella was held on the same day as the quarterfinal draw and was conducted by Boucher and Ducasse, as well. The matches will feature the four winners of the four quarterfinal matches and will be played at the Stade Robert Brettes in Mérignac. The matches will be contested on 1 May 2011.

1 May	Troyes	1–4	Saint-Étienne	Stade Robert Brettes, Mérignac
15:00 CEST	Petshi 31' (pen.)	Report	Diomandé 25'; Mayi 28', 38'; Saadi 73'	Referee: Thomas Grand d'Esnon

1 May	AS Monaco	3–1	Sedan	Stade Robert Brettes, Mérignac
17:30 CEST	Eysseric 64' (pen.); Pandor 81', 85'	Report	Tchenkoua 15'	Referee: Nicolas Rodrigues

=== Final ===
14 May
17:15 CEST

Saint-Étienne	1–1	AS Monaco
Douline 82'	Report	Labor 5'
Penalties
Mahaya (penalty scored); Cros (penalty missed); Diomandé (penalty scored); Douline (penalty scored); Saadi (penalty missed)	3–4	(penalty scored) Eysseric; (penalty scored) Appiah; (penalty scored) Pi; (penalty missed) Carrasco; (penalty scored) Morel

Stade de France, Saint-Denis
Referee: Gauthier Leggeri
