= 2017–18 Coupe de France preliminary rounds, Normandie =

French football competition

The 2017–18 Coupe de France preliminary rounds Normandie make up the qualifying competition to decide which teams from the French Normandie region take part in the main competition from the seventh round

== First round ==
The matches in Normandy were played on 19, 20 and 27 August 2017.

First round results: Normandie

Tie no	Home team (tier)	Score	Away team (tier)
1.	CA Pontois (9)	1–1 (3–4 p)	FC des Etangs (8)
2.	FC Digosville (11)	0–4	AS Valognes (8)
3.	Espérance St Jean-de-la-Haize (10)	1–3 (a.e.t.)	US St Pairaise (8)
4.	AS St Jores (11)	0–1	SM Haytillon (9)
5.	ES Quettetot-Rauville (10)	2–3	ES Plain (10)
6.	PL Octeville (10)	0–1	AS Pointe Cotentin (9)
7.	FC Val de Saire (10)	4–1	Elan Tocqueville (9)
8.	US La Glacerie (9)	3–2 (a.e.t.)	US Côte-des-Isles (8)
9.	AS Ste Marie-du-Mont (11)	0–4	SCU Douve Divette (8)
10.	ES Munevillaise (12)	2–3 (a.e.t.)	ES Hébécrevon (9)
11.	ES St Sauveur-La Ronde-Haye (10)	1–3	Condé Sports (8)
12.	AS Querqueville (9)	2–1	AS Brix (9)
13.	ES Gouville-sur-Mer (10)	2–0	US Lessay (11)
14.	ES Saussey (11)	0–4	FC 3 Rivières (9)
15.	FC de l'Elle (11)	2–3	Périers SF (9)
16.	ES des Marais (11)	1–5	US Semilly St André (9)
17.	US Aireloise (11)	0–9	Claies de Vire FC (12)
18.	US Roncey-Cerisy (9)	2–5	Créances SF (8)
19.	Entente Le Lorey-Hautville-Feugères (11)	3–2	Tessy-Moyon Sports (9)
20.	ES Trelly-Quettreville-Contrières (11)	0–9	ES Marigny-Lozon-Mesnil-Vigot (10)
21.	US Vesly-Laulne (11)	0–3	ES Pirou (10)
22.	ES Isigny-sur-Mer (11)	0–2	ES Portaise (10)
23.	USM Donville (8)	0–1	USCO Sourdeval (9)
24.	ES Marcilly-St Ovin (12)	2–11	ES Terregate-Beuvron-Juilley (10)
25.	AS Folligny (12)	0–0 (3–0 p)	FC Le-Val-St Père (11)
26.	ES Isigny-le-Buat (11)	2–4	St Hilaire-Virey-Landelles (10)
27.	FC Sienne (11)	2–3	US Mortainaise (9)
28.	US Pontorson (12)	1–3 (a.e.t.)	US St Quentin-sur-le-Homme (8)
29.	US St Martin-des-Champs (8)	2–0	AS Jullouville-Sartilly (8)
30.	AS Cerencaise (11)	0–4	Espérance St Jean-des-Champs (8)
31.	US Percy (10)	1–3	Patriote St Jamaise (8)
32.	AS Cahagnes (9)	1–2	CS Villedieu (8)
33.	ES Tronquay (10)	1–2	US Cheux-St Manvieu-Norrey (10)
34.	AC Bazoches (10)	2–3 (a.e.t.)	FC Pays Aiglon (8)
35.	JS Audrieu (10)	3–2	US Tilly-sur-Seulles (9)
36.	US Trévières (11)	1–5	Lystrienne Sportive (9)
37.	AFC St Denis-de-Méré (10)	0–2	Cingal FC (8)
38.	US Maisons (9)	1–3	USI Bessin Nord (9)
39.	AS Vaudry-Truttemer (10)	1–2	Muance FC (8)
40.	AJ St Hilaire-Petitville (10)	0–3	US Ste Croix St Lô (8)
41.	St Paul-du-Vernay FC (11)	0–2	JS Fleury-sur-Orne (9)
42.	ESI May-sur-Orne (9)	3–3 (8–9 p)	US Thaon-Le Fresne-Vallée de la Mue (8)
43.	Association Caen Sud (10)	0–3	US Guérinière (8)
44.	MSL Garcelles-Secqueville (10)	3–2	AS Giberville (10)
45.	ES Cormelles (10)	2–1	ES Carpiquet (8)
46.	ASL Chemin Vert (10)	2–3	AC Démouville-Cuverville (8)
47.	US Bretteville-l'Orgueilleuse (10)	1–3 (a.e.t.)	FC Langrune-Luc (9)
48.	Cresserons-Hermanville-Lion Terre et Mer (9)	0–2	AS Verson (8)
49.	USM Blainvillaise (9)	4–3 (a.e.t.)	JS Colleville (8)
50.	FC Louvigny (10)	1–3	FC Caen Sud Ouest (11)
51.	Stade St Sauverais (9)	2–1	ES Livarotaise (10)
52.	US Petruvienne (10)	0–3	ESFC Falaise (8)
53.	ES Bonnebosq (11)	1–4	FC Lisieux (9)
54.	EF Touques-St Gatien (11)	1–3	AS Villers Houlgate Côte Fleurie (9)
55.	US Viettoise (12)	0–6	CS Orbecquois-Vespèrois (8)
56.	FC Laize-Clinchamps (11)	0–5	Inter Odon FC (8)
57.	AS St Vigor-le-Grand (8)	1–3	ES Troarn (8)
58.	CS Beuvillers (11)	0–4	Dozulé FC (9)
59.	AS St Cyr-Fervaques (9)	12–2	ES Langannerie (11)
60.	ES Val de l'Orne (11)	3–2	US Aunay-sur-Odon (9)
61.	ES Courtonnaise (9)	2–2 (4–3 p)	AS St Désir (10)
62.	CL Colombellois (11)	3–1	ES Escoville-Hérouvillette (10)
63.	US Authie (11)	0–4	FC Hastings Rots (11)
64.	AS Biéville-Beuville (9)	2–3	FC Baie de l'Orne (9)
65.	FC Mouen (11)	2–1 (a.e.t.)	AS Mathieu (11)
66.	ES Pays d'Ouche (10)	0–4	AS Gacé (8)
67.	CO Ceaucé (9)	5–1	SS St Georges-Domfront (8)
68.	AS Passais-St Fraimbault (9)	4–2	US Andaine (8)
69.	AS Sarceaux Espoir (9)	0–3	OC Briouze (8)
70.	AS Boucé (10)	1–4 (a.e.t.)	Avenir St Germain-du-Corbéis (8)
71.	US Ménil-de-Briouze (11)	0–3	US Athis (9)
72.	US Flerienne (10)	3–1	Leopards St Georges (8)
73.	JS Tinchebray (9)	3–2	SL Pétruvien (9)
74.	SC Damigny (11)	0–5	Amicale Chailloué (8)
75.	FL Ségrie-Fontaine (10)	0–4	AS La Selle-la-Forge (8)
76.	US Putanges (12)	0–3	FC Carrouges (8)
77.	ES Ecouves (9)	0–3	Espérance Condé-sur-Sarthe (10)
78.	US Le Tourneur (11)	0–6	ES Thury-Harcourt (9)
79.	US Crielloise (10)	0–3	Entente Vienne et Saâne (9)
80.	Soligny-Aspres-Moulins (9)	1–2	AS Courteille Alençon (8)
81.	AM La Ferrière-aux-Etangs (9)	2–3	Avenir Messei (8)
82.	US Randonnai (10)	1–0	US Rugles (8)
83.	ES Damville (10)	2–2 (3–5 p)	CS Beaumont-le-Roger (9)
84.	SC Quittebeuf (11)	1–6	FC Val de Risle (9)
85.	FC Plasnes (11)	0–4	FC Roumois Nord (10)
86.	AS Andrésienne (11)	1–0	Stade Vernolien (10)
87.	FCI Bel Air (10)	2–3	FC Serquigny-Nassandres (8)
88.	AS Ailly-Fontaine-Bellenger (10)	1–4 (a.e.t.)	St Sébastien Foot (8)
89.	SC Bernay (10)	3–2	CA Pont-Audemer (8)
90.	US Cormelles-Lieurey (11)	0–2	SC Breteuil-Francheville (10)
91.	AC Beuzeville (11)	0–6	FC Epégard-Le Neubourg (8)
92.	FC Brionne (11)	0–4	US Conches (9)
93.	FC Vexin Sud (12)	1–5	AS Hondouville (9)
94.	AL St Michel Évreux (10)	3–1	FC Avrais Nonancourt (8)
95.	US Étrépagny (11)	0–6	Club Andelle Pîtres (8)
96.	GS Foucarmont-Réalcamp (11)	0–4	AS Mesnières-en-Bray (8)
97.	CS Lyonsais (12)	0–5	FAC Alizay (9)
98.	FC Bailly-en-Rivière (11)	0–6	ES Aumaloise (10)
99.	AS Vallée de l'Andelle (10)	0–5	AS Val-de-Reuil/Vaudreuil/Poses (8)
100.	ASC Bourg-Dun (11)	2–5	FC Biville-la-Baignarde (10)
101.	ASC Igoville (12)	1–4	AS Courcelles (10)
102.	FA Roumois (10)	1–1 (2–3 p)	FC Seine-Eure (8)
103.	La Croix Vallée d'Eure (10)	2–1 (a.e.t.)	CS Andelys (8)
104.	AS Cantonale La Charentonne (12)	0–4	SC Thiberville (9)
105.	AS Fidelaire-Ferrière (10)	1–2	FC Eure Madrie Seine (8)
106.	FC Plateau du Neubourg (11)	0–10	AS Routot (9)
107.	CS Ivry-la-Bataille (10)	0–3	FC Illiers-l'Évêque (8)
108.	FC Limésy (11)	0–3	AS Ouvillaise (8)
109.	US Envermeu (9)	1–1 (5–3 p)	US Londinières (10)
110.	FC Ézy-sur-Eure (11)	0–5	ES Normanville (8)
111.	CA Longuevillais (9)	2–0	Neuville AC (8)
112.	SC Vallée (9)	0–2	AS Tréport (9)
113.	FC Petit Caux (10)	3–0	FC Copains d'Abord (10)
114.	Yerville FC (9)	0–1	ES Arques (8)
115.	CO Fontaine-le-Dun (10)	4–2	US Ouainville (11)
116.	US Vatteville Brotonne (9)	1–2	Boucle de Seine (8)
117.	JA Évreux (11)	4–1	US St Aubin-le-Vertueux (12)
118.	US Doudeville (9)	1–1 (5–6 p)	AS Ouvillaise (8)
119.	US Le Theil (11)	0–3	AS Berd'huis Foot (9)
120.	US St Laurentaise (10)	0–4	Amicale Joseph Caulle (9)
121.	US Grèges (9)	3–4	ES Tourville (8)
122.	FC Hattenville Coeur de Caux (11)	0–4	FC Barentinois (9)
123.	Le Havre FC 2012 (9)	2–6	RC Havrais (8)
124.	ES Janval (10)	0–1	US Bacqueville-Pierreville (8)
125.	St Aubin UFC (10)	0–9	FC Offranville (8)
126.	AS St Pierre-de-Varengeville (10)	1–5	FC Le Trait-Duclair (8)
127.	US Auffay (9)	3–4	FC Neufchâtel (8)
128.	Entente Motteville/Croix-Mare (9)	2–1	Stade Valeriquais (8)
129.	US Ste Marie-des-Champs (9)	2–1	FC Fréville-Bouville SIVOM (9)
130.	AS Incheville (10)	2–8	US Normande 76 (10)
131.	AS St Vigor-d'Ymonville (10)	0–2	SC Octevillais (8)
132.	SS Gournay (9)	2–7	Gainneville AC (8)
133.	US des Vallées (10)	5–3	AS St Martin-de-Boscherville (9)
134.	US Les Loges (10)	0–4	US Godervillais (9)
135.	FC Ventois (10)	1–3	FC Tôtes (9)
136.	Union Fontainaise (10)	0–9	Havre Caucriauville Sportif (8)
137.	ESI St Antoine (9)	0–2 (a.e.t.)	US Épouville (8)
138.	FC Gruchet-le-Valasse (9)	2–3	Athleti'Caux FC (8)
139.	US St Martin-du-Manoir (9)	4–2	ES Mont-Gaillard (8)
140.	AS Sassetot-Thérouldeville (10)	1–2	US Cap de Caux (10)
141.	AL Tourville-la-Rivière (10)	1–8	GCO Bihorel (7)
142.	AC Bray Est (9)	0–3	AS Gournay-en-Bray (8)
143.	FC Nord Ouest (11)	1–4 (a.e.t.)	US Houppeville (8)
144.	AS La Frénaye (10)	0–2	CS Gravenchon (8)
145.	ASPTT Rouen (10)	1–5	Amicale Houlmoise Bondevillaise FC (8)
146.	AS La Bouille-Moulineaux (10)	0–9	US Grammont (8)
147.	AS Canton d'Argueil (10)	6–0	FC Criquiers (11)
148.	Olympique Darnétal (9)	0–1	Isneauville FC (10)
149.	Amicale Malaunay (10)	1–3	Stade Grande Quevilly (8)
150.	Grand-Couronne FC (9)	0–4	Rouen Sapins FC Grand-Mare (8)
151.	FC Sommery (10)	0–3	AS Buchy (9)
152.	EF Elbeuf (10)	1–1 (1–4 p)	FC St Étienne-du-Rouvray (8)
153.	FC St Julien Petit Quevilly (10)	9–2	Association Rouennaise Football (9)
154.	ES Tirepied (10)	2–1 (a.e.t.)	La Bréhalaise FC (10)

== Second round ==
These matches were played on 26, 27 and 31 August 2017.

Second round results: Normandie

Tie no	Home team (tier)	Score	Away team (tier)
1.	FC Équeurdreville-Hainneville (7)	0–2	ES Pointe Hague (6)
2.	US St Pairaise (8)	1–0	US St Quentin-sur-le-Homme (8)
3.	SC Bernay (10)	5–1	St Sébastien Foot (8)
4.	CS Beaumont-le-Roger (9)	0–3	Stade Porte Normande Vernon (7)
5.	SC Breteuil-Francheville (10)	0–2	FC Serquigny-Nassandres (8)
6.	FC Val de Risle (9)	1–2	AS Val-de-Reuil/Vaudreuil/Poses (8)
7.	FC Seine-Eure (8)	1–4	FAC Alizay (9)
8.	FC Roumois Nord (10)	1–2	Romilly/Pont-St Pierre FC (6)
9.	AS Courcelles (10)	0–1 (a.e.t.)	US Gasny (6)
10.	JA Évreux (11)	1–5	Club Andelle Pîtres (8)
11.	AL St Michel Évreux (10)	0–5	Saint Marcel Foot (7)
12.	AS Hondouville (9)	1–3	FC Gisors Vexin Normand (7)
13.	La Croix Vallée d'Eure (10)	2–4	ES Vallée de l'Oison (8)
14.	AS Routot (9)	3–6	FC Epégard-Le Neubourg (8)
15.	US Conches (9)	1–2	FC Eure Madrie Seine (8)
16.	RC Havrais (8)	3–0	Olympique Havrais Tréfileries-Neiges (7)
17.	SC Thiberville (9)	2–1	ES Normanville (8)
18.	AS Andrésienne (11)	0–3	FC Illiers-l'Évêque (8)
19.	US Lillebonne (8)	1–2	CS Honfleur (8)
20.	US Godervillais (9)	0–1	USF Fécamp (7)
21.	SC Octevillais (8)	1–0	CSSM Le Havre (7)
22.	Athleti'Caux FC (8)	1–1 (3–4 p)	St Romain AC (6)
23.	Gainneville AC (8)	1–6	US Bolbec (7)
24.	ES Aumaloise (10)	0–3	ES Arques (8)
25.	Havre Caucriauville Sportif (8)	10–1	US St Martin-du-Manoir (9)
26.	CS Gravenchon (8)	4–1	AS Montivilliers (7)
27.	US Cap de Caux (10)	3–0	AS Ste Adresse But (10)
28.	US Épouville (8)	2–2 (4–5 p)	SC Frileuse (6)
29.	Rouen Sapins FC Grand-Mare (8)	3–0	US Mesnil-Esnard/Franqueville (7)
30.	US Normande 76 (10)	2–7	JS St Nicolas-d'Aliermont (7)
31.	AS Tréport (9)	5–1	AS Plateau (8)
32.	US Bacqueville-Pierreville (8)	0–0 (4–5 p)	CA Longuevillais (9)
33.	FC Barentinois (9)	7–0	US des Vallées (10)
34.	CO Fontaine-le-Dun (10)	1–7	FC Neufchâtel (8)
35.	US Ste Marie-des-Champs (9)	0–3	Boucle de Seine (8)
36.	FC Petit Caux (10)	0–3	ES Tourville (8)
37.	Amicale Joseph Caulle (9)	1–5	AS Mesnières-en-Bray (8)
38.	FC Offranville (8)	2–2 (2–3 p)	Cany FC (7)
39.	AS Ouvillaise (8)	1–4	Olympique Pavillais (7)
40.	FC Tôtes (9)	0–6	US Luneraysienne (7)
41.	Entente Vienne et Saâne (9)	1–2	AS Ourville (8)
42.	FC Biville-la-Baignarde (10)	1–4	Yvetot AC (6)
43.	AS Querqueville (9)	1–5	UC Bricquebec (7)
44.	US Houppeville (8)	1–4	FC Bonsecours-St Léger (7)
45.	Entente Motteville/Croix-Mare (9)	0–2	AS Fauvillaise (7)
46.	Stade Grande Quevilly (8)	2–3	CO Cléon (7)
47.	AS Canton d'Argueil (10)	2–4	St Aubin FC (7)
48.	SM Haytillon (9)	0–8	AS Cherbourg Football (6)
49.	FC Le Trait-Duclair (8)	0–3	Mont-St-Aignan FC (8)
50.	AS Gournay-en-Bray (8)	1–4 (a.e.t.)	AS Madrillet Château Blanc (6)
51.	US Grammont (8)	1–3	Stade Sottevillais CC (6)
52.	Amicale Houlmoise Bondevillaise FC (8)	0–6	AL Déville-Maromme (6)
53.	RC Caudebecais (7)	1–0	FUSC Bois-Guillaume (6)
54.	AS Buchy (9)	2–3	GCO Bihorel (7)
55.	Isneauville FC (10)	0–4	Grand-Quevilly FC (6)
56.	US Envermeu (9)	0–2	Eu FC (6)
57.	Espérance Condé-sur-Sarthe (10)	7–1	FC Carrouges (8)
58.	SCU Douve Divette (8)	0–5	AS Tourlaville (6)
59.	FC Val de Saire (10)	1–3	US La Glacerie (9)
60.	Claies de Vire FC (12)	3–2	FC 3 Rivières (9)
61.	Périers SF (9)	5–1	US Ste Croix St Lô (8)
62.	Créances SF (8)	1–4	ES Coutances (6)
63.	ES Plain (10)	1–3	US Ouest Cotentin (7)
64.	ES Hébécrevon (9)	3–2	US Semilly St André (9)
65.	ES Marigny-Lozon-Mesnil-Vigot (10)	0–6	Agneaux FC (7)
66.	ES Gouville-sur-Mer (10)	2–3	FC des Etangs (8)
67.	ES Pirou (10)	3–8	CS Carentan (8)
68.	US Randonnai (10)	1–3	US Mortagnaise (8)
69.	Entente Le Lorey-Hautville-Feugères (11)	1–4	Condé Sports (8)
70.	Avenir St Germain-du-Corbéis (8)	2–1	FC Argentan (7)
71.	Espérance St Jean-des-Champs (8)	2–0	FC Agon-Coutainville (8)
72.	Patriote St Jamaise (8)	1–2	AS Brécey (7)
73.	AS Passais-St Fraimbault (9)	0–1	US Flerienne (10)
74.	CS Villedieu (8)	2–1 (a.e.t.)	US Ducey (6)
75.	US Athis (9)	0–6	Jeunesse Fertoise Bagnoles (7)
76.	JS Tinchebray (9)	0–9	FC Flers (6)
77.	US Mortainaise (9)	0–4	US St Martin-des-Champs (8)
78.	USCO Sourdeval (9)	5–1	CO Ceaucé (9)
79.	OC Briouze (8)	0–4	AS La Selle-la-Forge (8)
80.	AS Courteille Alençon (8)	2–0 (a.e.t.)	Avenir Messei (8)
81.	AS Gacé (8)	3–0	Amicale Chailloué (8)
82.	AS Berd'huis Foot (9)	6–5 (a.e.t.)	FC Pays Aiglon (8)
83.	AS Folligny (12)	1–8	St Hilaire-Virey-Landelles (10)
84.	Stade St Sauverais (9)	2–0	CL Colombellois (11)
85.	AS Villers Houlgate Côte Fleurie (9)	2–0	CA Lisieux (7)
86.	US Cheux-St Manvieu-Norrey (10)	3–3 (4–5 p)	US Villers-Bocage (7)
87.	ES Portaise (10)	0–5	SC Hérouvillais (7)
88.	AC Démouville-Cuverville (8)	1–2	AS Trouville-Deauville (6)
89.	FC Langrune-Luc (9)	1–3	AG Caennaise (7)
90.	AS Pointe Cotentin (9)	0–2	AS Valognes (8)
91.	AS St Cyr-Fervaques (9)	1–2	AS Potigny-Villers-Canivet-Ussy (7)
92.	Inter Odon FC (8)	0–3	AF Virois (6)
93.	ES Thury-Harcourt (9)	0–0 (4–3 p)	AS Ifs (7)
94.	ES Cormelles (10)	0–9	ASPTT Caen (6)
95.	ES Troarn (8)	2–0	AJS Ouistreham (7)
96.	USM Blainvillaise (9)	3–4 (a.e.t.)	Maladrerie OS (6)
97.	Lystrienne Sportive (9)	1–4	Bourguébus-Soliers FC (7)
98.	Muance FC (8)	1–3 (a.e.t.)	LC Bretteville-sur-Odon (6)
99.	JS Audrieu (10)	2–3	FC Lisieux (9)
100.	US Pont-l'Évêque (8)	1–2	JS Douvres (6)
101.	Cingal FC (8)	1–3	US Thaon-Le Fresne-Vallée de la Mue (8)
102.	FC Baie de l'Orne (9)	5–3	ES Val de l'Orne (11)
103.	Dozulé FC (9)	1–1 (3–1 p)	US Guérinière (8)
104.	FC Mouen (11)	1–3	USC Mézidon (7)
105.	USI Bessin Nord (9)	5–1	FC Hastings Rots (11)
106.	CS Orbecquois-Vespèrois (8)	0–1 (a.e.t.)	ES Courtonnaise (9)
107.	FC Caen Sud Ouest (11)	0–1	ESFC Falaise (8)
108.	MSL Garcelles-Secqueville (10)	0–3	Réveil St Germain Courseulles-sur-Mer (7)
109.	JS Fleury-sur-Orne (9)	1–8	AS Verson (8)
110.	FC St Julien Petit Quevilly (10)	2–2 (2–4 p)	FC St Étienne-du-Rouvray (8)
111.	ES Terregate-Beuvron-Juilley (10)	0–2	ES Tirepied (10)

== Third round ==
These matches were played on 9 and 10 September 2017.

Third round results: Normandie

Tie no	Home team (tier)	Score	Away team (tier)
1.	Cany FC (7)	2–3	SC Octevillais (8)
2.	Stade St Sauverais (9)	0–5	SU Dives-Cabourg (5)
3.	AS Potigny-Villers-Canivet-Ussy (7)	1–3	US Alençon (5)
4.	Condé Sports (8)	0–1	ES Coutances (6)
5.	US St Pairaise (8)	1–4	FC Saint-Lô Manche (5)
6.	AL Déville-Maromme (6)	0–2	CMS Oissel (5)
7.	AS Valognes (8)	0–2	AS Tourlaville (6)
8.	US Thaon-Le Fresne-Vallée de la Mue (8)	3–1 (a.e.t.)	CS Carentan (8)
9.	US La Glacerie (9)	1–4	Agneaux FC (7)
10.	ES Hébécrevon (9)	4–7	Réveil St Germain Courseulles-sur-Mer (7)
11.	FC des Etangs (8)	1–2	UC Bricquebec (7)
12.	Périers SF (9)	0–9	Bayeux FC (5)
13.	USI Bessin Nord (9)	4–3	US Ouest Cotentin (7)
14.	Claies de Vire FC (12)	0–2 (a.e.t.)	ES Pointe Hague (6)
15.	Jeunesse Fertoise Bagnoles (7)	1–0	Espérance St Jean-des-Champs (8)
16.	US St Martin-des-Champs (8)	1–2 (a.e.t.)	CS Villedieu (8)
17.	US Flerienne (10)	1–6	AF Virois (6)
18.	ES Thury-Harcourt (9)	0–1	US Villers-Bocage (7)
19.	FC Flers (6)	2–0	AS Brécey (7)
20.	AS Cherbourg Football (6)	3–0	JS Douvres (6)
21.	ES Courtonnaise (9)	1–3	FC Baie de l'Orne (9)
22.	Bourguébus-Soliers FC (7)	1–1 (5–4 p)	Avenir St Germain-du-Corbéis (8)
23.	St Hilaire-Virey-Landelles (10)	0–7	AG Caennaise (7)
24.	USC Mézidon (7)	2–2 (1–3 p)	CS Honfleur (8)
25.	FC Lisieux (9)	3–1	Dozulé FC (9)
26.	Club Andelle Pîtres (8)	1–3	Pacy Ménilles RC (5)
27.	AS Gacé (8)	0–6	ES Troarn (8)
28.	ESFC Falaise (8)	6–2	AS Courteille Alençon (8)
29.	AS Villers Houlgate Côte Fleurie (9)	0–4	LC Bretteville-sur-Odon (6)
30.	AS Berd'huis Foot (9)	0–17	USON Mondeville (5)
31.	US Mortagnaise (8)	2–1	SC Hérouvillais (7)
32.	AS Verson (8)	1–3 (a.e.t.)	Maladrerie OS (6)
33.	SC Thiberville (9)	4–5 (a.e.t.)	Stade Porte Normande Vernon (7)
34.	USCO Sourdeval (9)	8–3	ES Tirepied (10)
35.	AS Fauvillaise (7)	0–0 (3–5 p)	Rouen Sapins FC Grand-Mare (8)
36.	CA Longuevillais (9)	1–3	CS Gravenchon (8)
37.	Romilly/Pont-St Pierre FC (6)	1–2	RC Caudebecais (7)
38.	SC Bernay (10)	1–2	FC Eure Madrie Seine (8)
39.	FC Illiers-l'Évêque (8)	2–4	FC Epégard-Le Neubourg (8)
40.	FC Serquigny-Nassandres (8)	0–8	Évreux FC 27 (5)
41.	AS Val-de-Reuil/Vaudreuil/Poses (8)	2–7	FC Gisors Vexin Normand (7)
42.	ES Arques (8)	0–3	ES Tourville (8)
43.	AS Ourville (8)	2–3 (a.e.t.)	JS St Nicolas-d'Aliermont (7)
44.	AS Tréport (9)	1–1 (3–4 p)	Eu FC (6)
45.	US Bolbec (7)	1–6	ESM Gonfreville (5)
46.	ES Vallée de l'Oison (8)	1–0 (a.e.t.)	US Gasny (6)
47.	RC Havrais (8)	0–5	FC Dieppe (5)
48.	FC Barentinois (9)	1–8	FC Rouen (5)
49.	FAC Alizay (9)	0–0 (3–2 p)	Stade Sottevillais CC (6)
50.	US Luneraysienne (7)	4–0	St Romain AC (6)
51.	US Cap de Caux (10)	2–2 (3–4 p)	Havre Caucriauville Sportif (8)
52.	AS Madrillet Château Blanc (6)	2–2 (2–3 p)	Saint Marcel Foot (7)
53.	Boucle de Seine (8)	0–6	CO Cléon (7)
54.	USF Fécamp (7)	1–1 (4–1 p)	SC Frileuse (6)
55.	FC St Étienne-du-Rouvray (8)	1–1 (5–4 p)	GCO Bihorel (7)
56.	Olympique Pavillais (7)	2–1	Grand-Quevilly FC (6)
57.	FC Bonsecours-St Léger (7)	3–4	Yvetot AC (6)
58.	St Aubin FC (7)	3–2	Mont-St-Aignan FC (8)
59.	AS Mesnières-en-Bray (8)	0–2	FC Neufchâtel (8)
60.	Espérance Condé-sur-Sarthe (10)	1–2	AS Trouville-Deauville (6)
61.	AS La Selle-la-Forge (8)	0–7	ASPTT Caen (6)

== Fourth round ==
These matches were played on 23 and 24 September 2017.

Fourth round results: Normandie

Tie no	Home team (tier)	Score	Away team (tier)
1.	US Thaon-Le Fresne-Vallée de la Mue (8)	1–7	FC Saint-Lô Manche (5)
2.	USF Fécamp (7)	2–2 (3–4 p)	FC Dieppe (5)
3.	SU Dives-Cabourg (5)	2–1 (a.e.t.)	US Alençon (5)
4.	ESM Gonfreville (5)	1–0	Yvetot AC (6)
5.	ASPTT Caen (6)	1–0	USON Mondeville (5)
6.	ES Pointe Hague (6)	1–2 (a.e.t.)	AF Virois (6)
7.	US Mortagnaise (8)	2–4	AS Trouville-Deauville (6)
8.	UC Bricquebec (7)	2–5	US Granville (4)
9.	AS Tourlaville (6)	2–1 (a.e.t.)	US Villers-Bocage (7)
10.	Agneaux FC (7)	3–1	ES Coutances (6)
11.	USI Bessin Nord (9)	0–2	AS Cherbourg Football (6)
12.	USCO Sourdeval (9)	1–3 (a.e.t.)	AG Caennaise (7)
13.	ESFC Falaise (8)	2–5 (a.e.t.)	Bourguébus-Soliers FC (7)
14.	ES Troarn (8)	4–0	FC Lisieux (9)
15.	SC Octevillais (8)	4–0	US Luneraysienne (7)
16.	LC Bretteville-sur-Odon (6)	0–0 (4–2 p)	Jeunesse Fertoise Bagnoles (7)
17.	FC Baie de l'Orne (9)	1–3 (a.e.t.)	Réveil St Germain Courseulles-sur-Mer (7)
18.	Maladrerie OS (6)	3–3 (1–4 p)	FC Flers (6)
19.	CS Villedieu (8)	0–4	Bayeux FC (5)
20.	JS St Nicolas-d'Aliermont (7)	4–2 (a.e.t.)	CS Honfleur (8)
21.	Rouen Sapins FC Grand-Mare (8)	1–1 (5–4 p)	FC Gisors Vexin Normand (7)
22.	Havre Caucriauville Sportif (8)	3–1	ES Tourville (8)
23.	CS Gravenchon (8)	2–1	Eu FC (6)
24.	CO Cléon (7)	1–0	FC Eure Madrie Seine (8)
25.	FC Neufchâtel (8)	0–1	FC Rouen (5)
26.	ES Vallée de l'Oison (8)	1–3	FAC Alizay (9)
27.	Saint Marcel Foot (7)	6–1	FC St Étienne-du-Rouvray (8)
28.	Olympique Pavillais (7)	1–2	Évreux FC 27 (5)
29.	FC Epégard-Le Neubourg (8)	3–4	RC Caudebecais (7)
30.	Stade Porte Normande Vernon (7)	1–0	Pacy Ménilles RC (5)
31.	St Aubin FC (7)	1–1 (3–4 p)	CMS Oissel (5)

== Fifth round ==
These matches were played on 7 and 8 October 2017.

Fifth round results: Normandie

Tie no	Home team (tier)	Score	Away team (tier)
1.	CMS Oissel (5)	2–1	FC Dieppe (5)
2.	CO Cléon (7)	1–4	ESM Gonfreville (5)
3.	FC Flers (6)	1–2 (a.e.t.)	ASPTT Caen (6)
4.	FC Saint-Lô Manche (5)	6–1	AS Tourlaville (6)
5.	AF Virois (6)	2–1	AS Cherbourg Football (6)
6.	AG Caennaise (7)	0–5	US Avranches (3)
7.	US Granville (4)	3–2	SU Dives-Cabourg (5)
8.	Bourguébus-Soliers FC (7)	0–2 (a.e.t.)	ES Troarn (8)
9.	FAC Alizay (9)	1–1 (3–1 p)	Rouen Sapins FC Grand-Mare (8)
10.	Évreux FC 27 (5)	5–1	AS Trouville-Deauville (6)
11.	Réveil St Germain Courseulles-sur-Mer (7)	2–6	LC Bretteville-sur-Odon (6)
12.	SC Octevillais (8)	1–3	FC Rouen (5)
13.	Stade Porte Normande Vernon (7)	1–0	CS Gravenchon (8)
14.	RC Caudebecais (7)	0–1	Saint Marcel Foot (7)
15.	JS St Nicolas-d'Aliermont (7)	3–0	Havre Caucriauville Sportif (8)
16.	Agneaux FC (7)	1–4	Bayeux FC (5)

== Sixth round ==
These matches were played on 21 and 22 October 2017.

Sixth round results: Normandie

Tie no	Home team (tier)	Score	Away team (tier)
1.	Saint Marcel Foot (7)	1–2	AF Virois (6)
2.	Bayeux FC (5)	0–2	US Granville (4)
3.	JS St Nicolas-d'Aliermont (7)	0–4	Évreux FC 27 (5)
4.	FC Rouen (5)	0–0 (4–2 p)	ESM Gonfreville (5)
5.	Stade Porte Normande Vernon (7)	0–7	US Avranches (3)
6.	ES Troarn (8)	1–4 (a.e.t.)	FC Saint-Lô Manche (5)
7.	LC Bretteville-sur-Odon (6)	1–1 (5–4 p)	CMS Oissel (5)
8.	FAC Alizay (9)	1–4	ASPTT Caen (6)
