= Electoral history of Ralph Nader =

Elections featuring American politician

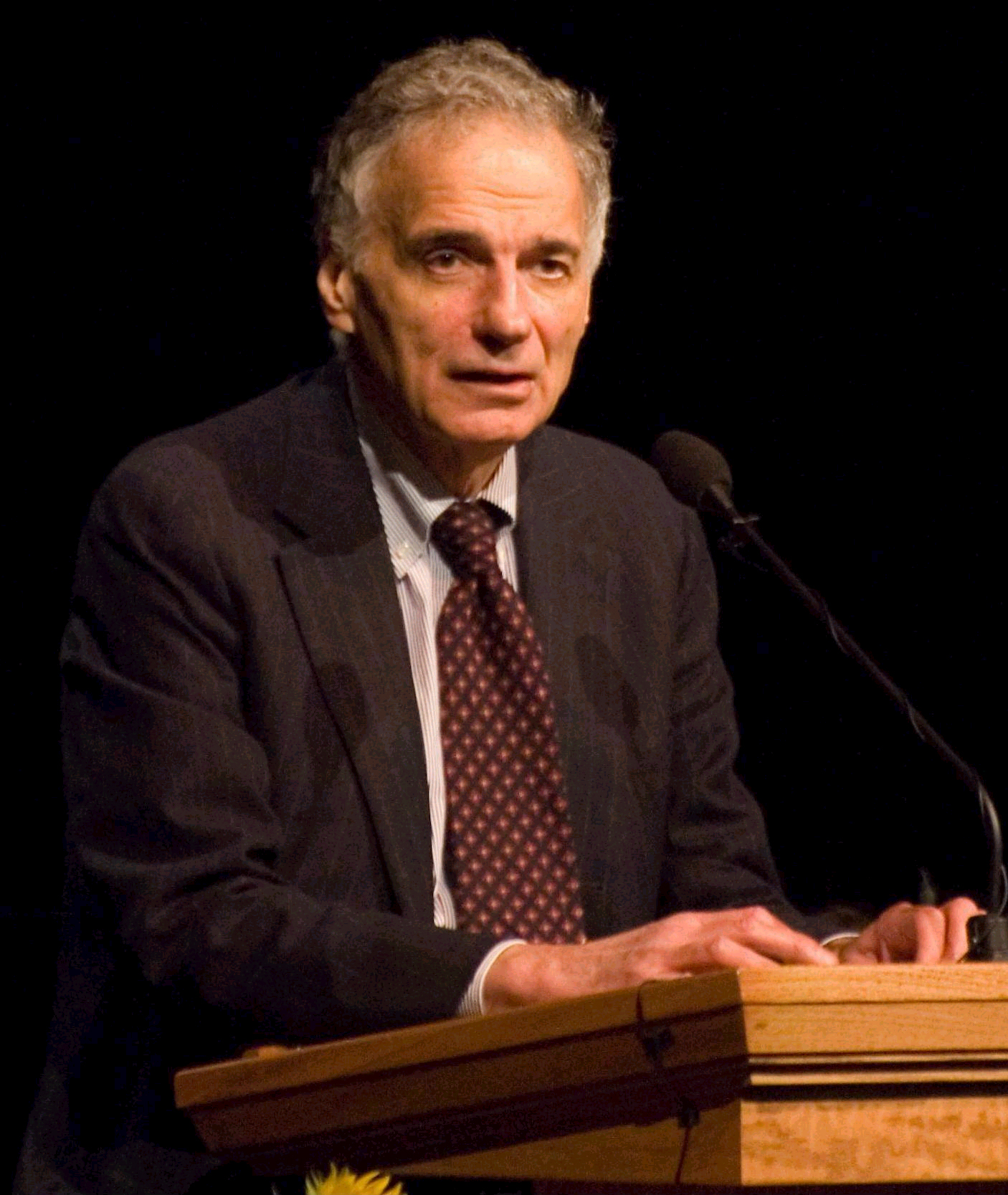
Ralph Nader, 2007

Electoral history of Ralph Nader, an American attorney, author, lecturer, political activist, and candidate for President of the United States in four elections.

1972 Democratic National Convention (Vice Presidential tally):

- Thomas Eagleton - 1,742 (59.07%)
- Frances Farenthold - 405 (13.73%)
- Mike Gravel - 226 (7.66%)
- Endicott Peabody - 108 (3.66%)
- Clay Smothers - 74 (2.51%)
- Birch Bayh - 62 (2.10%)
- Peter Rodino - 57 (1.93%)
- Jimmy Carter - 30 (1.02%)
- Shirley Chisholm - 20 (0.68%)
- Moon Landrieu - 19 (0.64%)
- Edward T. Breathitt - 18 (0.61%)
- Ted Kennedy - 15 (0.51%)
- Fred R. Harris - 14 (0.48%)
- Richard G. Hatcher - 11 (0.37%)
- Harold E. Hughes - 10 (0.34%)
- Joseph M. Montoya - 9 (0.31%)
- William L. Guy - 8 (0.27%)
- Adlai Stevenson III - 8 (0.27%)
- Robert Bergland - 5 (0.17%)
- Hodding Carter - 5 (0.17%)
- Cesar Chavez - 5 (0.17%)
- Wilbur Mills - 5 (0.17%)
- Wendell Anderson - 4 (0.14%)
- Stanley Arnold - 4 (0.14%)
- Ron Dellums - 4 (0.14%)
- John J. Houlihan - 4 (0.14%)
- Roberto A. Mondragon - 4 (0.14%)
- Reubin O'Donovan Askew - 3 (0.10%)
- Herman Badillo - 3 (0.10%)
- Eugene McCarthy - 3 (0.10%)
- Claiborne Pell - 3 (0.10%)
- Terry Sanford - 3 (0.10%)
- Ramsey Clark - 2 (0.07%)
- Richard J. Daley - 2 (0.07%)
- John DeCarlo - 2 (0.07%)
- Ernest Gruening - 2 (0.07%)
- Roger Mudd - 2 (0.07%)
- Edmund Muskie - 2 (0.07%)
- Claude Pepper - 2 (0.07%)
- Abraham Ribicoff - 2 (0.07%)
- Pat Taylor - 2 (0.07%)
- Leonard F. Woodcock - 2 (0.07%)
- Bruno Agnoli - 2 (0.07%)
- Ernest Albright - 1 (0.03%)
- William A. Barrett - 1 (0.03%)
- Daniel Berrigan - 1 (0.03%)
- Phillip Berrigan - 1 (0.03%)
- Julian Bond - 1 (0.03%)
- Hargrove Bowles - 1 (0.03%)
- Archibald Burton - 1 (0.03%)
- Phillip Burton - 1 (0.03%)
- William Chappell - 1 (0.03%)
- Lawton Chiles - 1 (0.03%)
- Frank Church - 1 (0.03%)
- Robert Drinan - 1 (0.03%)
- Nick Galifianakis - 1 (0.03%)
- John Goodrich - 1 (0.03%)
- Michael Griffin - 1 (0.03%)
- Martha Griffiths - 1 (0.03%)
- Charles Hamilton - 1 (0.03%)
- Patricia Harris - 1 (0.03%)
- Jim Hunt - 1 (0.03%)
- Daniel Inouye - 1 (0.03%)
- Henry M. Jackson - 1 (0.03%)
- Robery Kariss - 1 (0.03%)
- Allard K. Lowenstein - 1 (0.03%)
- Mao Zedong - 1 (0.03%)
- Eleanor McGovern - 1 (0.03%)
- Martha Mitchell - 1 (0.03%)
- Ralph Nader - 1 (0.03%)
- George Norcross - 1 (0.03%)
- Jerry Rubin - 1 (0.03%)
- Fred Seaman - 1 (0.03%)
- Joe Smith - 1 (0.03%)
- Benjamin Spock - 1 (0.03%)
- Patrick Tavolacci - 1 (0.03%)
- George Wallace - 1 (0.03%)
- Jake Ellenich - 1 (0.03%)

1992 Republican New Hampshire primary:

- George H. W. Bush (inc.) - 92,274 (53.20%)
- Pat Buchanan - 65,109 (37.54%)
- Paul Tsongas* - 3,676 (2.12%)
- Ralph Nader* - 3,258 (1.88%)

(*) - write-in candidate
Listed only those who won over 1% of votes

1992 Democratic New Hampshire Vice Presidential primary:

- Endicott Peabody - 34,533 (59.68%)
- Susan K.Y. Shargal - 1,097 (1.90%)
- Ralph Nader* - 1,097 (1.90%)
- Mario Cuomo* - 739 (1.28%)
- Paul Tsongas* - 649 (1.12%)
- Bob Kerrey* - 502 (0.87%)

(*) - write-in candidate

1996 Peace and Freedom Party California Presidential primary:

- Monica Moorehead - 2,153 (33.91%)
- Jan B. Tucker - 1,512 (23.81%)
- Gerald Horne - 1,430 (22.52%)
- Mary Cal Hollis - 1,068 (16.82%)
- Ralph Nader - 187 (2.95%)

1996 Reform Party Presidential primaries:

- Ralph Nader - 575 (70.90%)
- Ross Perot - 57 (7.03%)
- Bill Clinton (inc.) - 32 (3.95%)
- Others - 105 (12.95%)

1996 Libertarian Party Presidential primaries:

- Harry Browne - 9,890 (51.40%)
- Rick Tompkins - 3,551 (18.45%)
- Irvin Shiff - 3,239 (16.83%)
- Douglass J. Ohmen - 1,517 (7.88%)
- No preference - 237 (1.23%)
- Pat Buchanan* - 176 (0.92%)
- Ralph Nader* - 127 (0.66%)
- Steve Forbes* - 103 (0.54%)
- Lamar Alexander* - 82 (0.43%)
- Bob Dole* - 67 (0.35%)
- Bill Clinton (inc.) - 65 (0.34%)
- Colin Powell* - 43 (0.22%)
- Alan Keyes* - 27 (0.14%)
- Morry Taylor* - 19 (0.10%)
- Richard Lugar* - 13 (0.07%)
- Jack Kemp* - 8 (0.04%)
- Al Gore* - 4 (0.02%)
- Ross Perot* - 2 (0.01%)
- Carmen C. Chimento* - 1 (0.01%)
- Phil Gramm* - 1 (0.01%)
- Carolina P. Killeen* - 1 (0.01%)

1996 Green Party Presidential primaries:

- Ralph Nader - 23,625 (97.91%)
- Mary Cal Hollis - 395 (1.64%)
- Uncommitted - 110 (0.46%)

1996 Green Party National Convention (Presidential tally):

- Ralph Nader - unopposed

1996 United States presidential election

- Bill Clinton/Al Gore (D) (inc.) - 47,400,125 (49.3%) and 379 electoral votes (31 states and D.C. carried)
- Bob Dole/Jack Kemp (R) - 39,198,755 (40.7%) and 159 electoral votes (19 states carried)
- Ross Perot/Pat Choate (Reform) - 8,085,402 (8.4%)
- Ralph Nader (Green) - 685,297 (0.7%)
- Harry Browne/Jo Jorgensen (Libertarian) - 485,798 (0.5%)
- Howard Phillips/Herb Titus (Taxpayers) - 184,820 (0.1%)
- John Hagelin/Michael Tompkins (Natural Law) - 113,670 (0.1%)
- Others - 121,534 (0.01%)

2000 California Presidential primary for independent voters:

- John McCain (R) - 791,864 (38.03%)
- Al Gore (G) - 454,629 (21.84%)
- George W. Bush (R) - 443,304 (21.29%)
- Bill Bradley (D) - 159,772 (7.67%)
- Ralph Nader (G) - 89,210 (4.29%)
- Alan Keyes (R) - 57,695 (2.77%)
- Donald Trump (Ref.) - 14,597 (0.70%)
- Harry Browne (LBT) - 11,973 (0.58%)
- George D. Weber (Ref.) - 9,173 (0.44%)
- Steve Forbes (R) - 6,035 (0.29%)
- Howard Phillips (American Independent) - 5,957 (0.29%)
- John Hagelin (Natural Law) - 4,843 (0.23%)
- Joel Kovel (G) - 4,646 (0.22%)
- Robert M. Bowman (Ref.) - 4,587 (0.22%)

2000 Green Party Presidential primaries:

- Ralph Nader - 24,638 (91.08%)
- Joel Kovel - 2,147 (7.94%)
- Eric Boucher - 178 (0.66%)
- Stephen Gaskin - 67 (0.25%)
- Uncommitted - 21 (0.08%)

2000 Green Party National Convention (Presidential tally):

- Ralph Nader - 295 (92.48%)
- Eric Boucher - 10 (3.14%)
- Stephen Gaskin - 10 (3.14%)
- Joel Kovel - 3 (0.94%)
- None of the above - 1 (0.31%)

2000 Independence Party of New York Presidential Convention:

- John Hagelin - 380,269 (90.00%)
- Ralph Nader - 30,854 (7.30%)
- Pat Buchanan - 5,704 (1.35%)
- Donald Trump - 5,704 (1.35%)

2000 United States presidential election:

- George W. Bush/Dick Cheney (R) - 50,460,110 (47.9%) and 271 electoral votes (30 states carried)
- Al Gore/Joe Lieberman (D) - 51,003,926 (48.4%) and 266 electoral votes (20 states and D.C. carried)
- Abstaining - 1 electoral vote (D.C. faithless elector)
- Ralph Nader/Winona LaDuke (Green) - 2,883,105 (2.7%)
- Pat Buchanan/Ezola B. Foster (Reform) - 449,225 (0.4%)
- Harry Browne/Art Olivier (Libertarian) - 384,516 (0.4%)
- Howard Phillips/Curtis Frazier (Taxpayers) - 98,022 (0.1%)
- John Hagelin/Nat Goldhaber (Natural Law) - 83,702 (0.1%)

Minnesota Independence Party presidential caucus, 2004:

- John Edwards - 335 (41.10%)
- John Kerry - 149 (18.28%)
- George W. Bush (inc.) - 94 (11.53%)
- Ralph Nader - 78 (9.57%)
- None of the above - 66 (8.10%)
- Dennis Kucinich - 40 (4.91%)
- Lorna Salzman - 9 (1.10%)
- John McCain - 9 (1.10%)
- Al Sharpton - 5 (0.61%)
- David Cobb - 4 (0.49%)
- Wesley Clark - 4 (0.49%)
- Joe Lieberman - 4 (0.49%)
- Howard Dean - 3 (0.37%)
- Jesse Ventura - 3 (0.37%)
- Gary P. Nolan - 2 (0.25%)
- Timothy J. Penny - 2 (0.25%)
- Kent P. Mesplay - 1 (0.12%)
- John B. Anderson - 1 (0.12%)
- Charles W. Barkley - 1 (0.12%)
- Dean M. Barkley - 1 (0.12%)
- Bill Bradley - 1 (0.12%)
- Rudy Giuliani - 1 (0.12%)
- Mickey Mouse - 1 (0.12%)
- Theodore Roosevelt - 1 (0.12%)

2004 Reform Party National Convention (Presidential tally):

- 'Ralph Nader - 28 (62.22%)
- Michael Peroutka - 6 (13.33%)
- Richard Green - 4 (8.89%)
- John Buchanan - 3 (6.67%)
- Others - 4 (8.89%)

2004 Green Party National Convention (Presidential tally):

- David Cobb - 408 (36.20%)
- No nominee - 308 (27.33%)
- Peter Camejo - 119 (10.56%)
- Ralph Nader - 118 (10.47%)
- Kent P. Mesplay - 43 (3.82%)
- Lorna Salzman - 40 (3.55%)
- None of the above - 36 (3.19%)
- JoAnne Bier Beeman - 14 (1.24%)
- Carol A. Miller - 10 (0.89%)
- Dennis Kucinich - 9 (0.80%)
- Uncommitted - 7 (0.62%)
- Paul Glover - 6 (0.53%)
- Abstaining - 3 (0.27%)
- Jonathan Farley - 3 (0.27%)
- Sheila Bilyeu - 2 (0.18%)
- Eugene Victor Debs - 1 (0.09%)

2004 Peace and Freedom Party National Convention (Presidential tally)':

- Leonard Peltier - 17 (53.13%)
- Ralph Nader - 8 (25.00%)
- Walt Brown - 7 (21.88%)

2004 Independence Party of New York Convention:

- Ralph Nader - 623,931 (95.40%)
- John Kerry - 26,161 (4.00%)
- George W. Bush (inc.) - 2,616 (0.40%)
- David Cobb - 1,308 (0.20%)

2004 United States presidential election:

- George W. Bush/Dick Cheney (R) (inc.) - 62,040,610 (50.73%) and 286 electoral votes (31 states carried)
- John Kerry/John Edwards (D) - 59,028,444 (48.27%) and 251 electoral votes (19 states and D.C. carried)
- John Edwards (D) - 1 electoral vote (Minnesota faithless elector)
- Ralph Nader/Peter Camejo (I) - 465,650 (0.38%)
- Michael Badnarik/Richard Campagna (Libertarian) - 397,265 (0.32%)
- Michael Peroutka/Chuck Baldwin (Constitution) - 143,630 (0.12%)
- David Cobb/Pat LaMarche (Green) - 119,859 (0.096%)

2008 California Peace and Freedom Party Presidential primary:

- Ralph Nader - 2,543 (40.00%)
- Cynthia McKinney - 1,353 (21.28%)
- Gloria E. La Riva - 1,335 (21.00%)
- Brian P. Moore - 346 (5.44%)
- John R. Crockford - 339 (5.33%)
- Stewart Alexander - 335 (5.27%)
- Stanley Martin Hetz - 107 (1.68%)

2008 Green Party Presidential primaries:

- Ralph Nader - 21,146 (53.04%)
- Cynthia McKinney - 11,520 (28.90%)
- Elaine Brown - 1,540 (3.86%)
- Kent P. Mesplay - 1,227 (3.08%)
- Kat Swift - 1,182 (2.97%)
- Jared Ball - 981 (2.46%)
- Jesse Johnson - 633 (1.59%)
- Howie Hawkins - 498 (1.25%)
- Uncommitted - 440 (1.10%)
- Write-in - 419 (1.05%)
- No preference - 194 (0.49%)
- No candidate - 68 (0.17%)
- Undecided - 20 (0.05%)
- None of the above - 1 (0.00%)

'2008 Vermont Liberty Union Party Presidential primary:

- Brian P. Moore - 178 (44.61%)
- Barack Obama* - 25 (6.27%)
- Hillary Clinton* - 15 (3.76%)
- Ralph Nader* - 5 (1.25%)
- Eugene Victor Debs* - 1 (0.25%)
- Patrick Leahy* - 1 (0.25%)
- John McCain* - 1 (0.25%)
- Richard Norton* - 1 (0.25%)
- Ron Paul* - 1 (0.25%)
- Morgan Phillips* - 1 (0.25%)
- Others - 170 (42.61%)

2008 Connecticut for Lieberman Presidential caucus:

- Barack Obama - 19 (82.61%)
- Ralph Nader - 3 (13.04%)
- No nominee - 1 (4.35%)

2008 United States presidential election:

- Barack Obama/Joe Biden (D) - 69,498,516 (52.93%) and 365 electoral votes (28 states and D.C. carried)
- John McCain/Sarah Palin (R) - 59,948,323 (45.65%) and 173 electoral votes (22 states carried)
- Ralph Nader/Matt Gonzalez (I) - 739,034 (0.56%)
- Bob Barr/Wayne Allyn Root (Libertarian) - 523,715 (0.40%)
- Chuck Baldwin/Darrell Castle (Constitution) - 199,750 (0.15%)
- Cynthia McKinney/Rosa Clemente (Green) - 161,797 (0.12%)

== See also ==
- Ralph Nader's presidential campaigns
- Electoral history of Bob Barr (Libertarian nominee)
- Electoral history of Cynthia McKinney (Green nominee)
- Electoral history of John McCain (Republican nominee)
- Electoral history of Barack Obama (Democratic nominee)
- Electoral history of Kamala Harris (Democratic nominee)
