= Jean-François Péron =

French footballer (born 1965)

Jeff Peron
Personal information
- Full name: Jean-François Peron
- Date of birth: 11 October 1965 (age 61)
- Place of birth: Saint-Omer, France
- Height: 5 ft 8 in (1.73 m)
- Position: Midfielder

Senior career*
Years	Team	Apps	(Gls)
1983–1988	Dunkerque	116	(20)
1988–1992	Strasbourg	133	(11)
1992–1994	Lens	58	(5)
1994–1997	Caen	75	(2)
1997	Ayr United	1	(0)
1997–1998	Walsall	38	(1)
1998–1999	Portsmouth	48	(3)
1999–2000	Wigan Athletic	23	(0)
2000–2004	FC Bayeux		

Managerial career
- 2008-2009: SC Hérouville
- 2009-2010: ASPTT Caen
- 2010-2013: USON Mondeville
- * Club domestic league appearances and goals

Jean-François Péron (born 11 October 1965), more commonly known in England as Jeff Peron, is a retired French professional footballer who played as a midfielder for several teams in the Football League.

After finishing his playing career, Péron moved into coaching. During which time he coached SC Hérouville, ASPTT Caen and USON Mondeville. Since 2023 he is now a coach at ASEC Mimosas.
