= FC Chartres =

French football club

- Full name: Football Club de Chartres
- Founded: 1989; 37 years ago
- Dissolved: 2018
- Ground: Stade des Grands Pres, Chartres
- 2017–18: National 2 Group D, 7th
Home colours

Football Club de Chartres was a French association football club, based in Chartres.

== History ==
The club was founded in 1989 as the result of a merger between Vélo Sport Chartrain and Sporting Club de Chartres. They are based in the town of Chartres and their home stadium is the Stade des Grands Pres. In May 2018, the club merged with Chartres Horizon to form C'Chartres Football.

== Famous players ==
- (France) Enzo Millot (youth)
- (France) Adrien Truffert (youth)

== Notable Managers ==
- (France) Joël Germain
