= Jérémy Labor =

French footballer (born 1992)

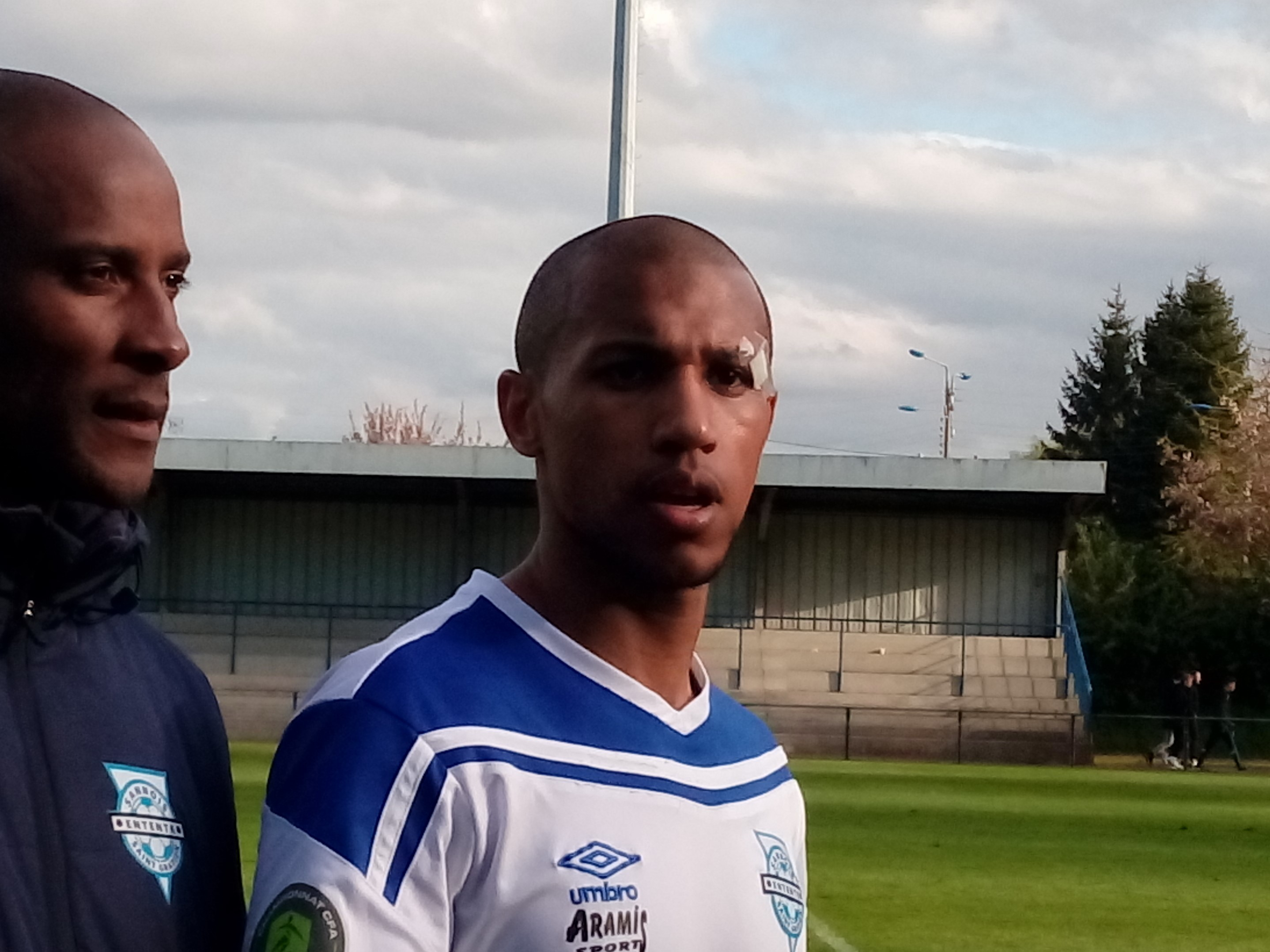
- Labòr with Entente SSG in 2017

Personal information
- Full name: Jérémy Labor
- Date of birth: 19 March 1992 (age 34)
- Place of birth: Pontoise, France
- Height: 1.80 m (5 ft 11 in)
- Position: Defender

Youth career
- 2003–2006: Saint-Ouen l'Aumône
- 2006–2007: Entente SSG
- 2007–2011: Monaco

Senior career*
Years	Team	Apps	(Gls)
2011–2014	Monaco	2	(0)
2013–2014	→ RWDM Brussels (loan)	32	(0)
2014–2015	Zulte Waregem	4	(0)
2016	DSK Shivajians	0	(0)
2016–2019	Entente SSG	80	(4)
2019–2021	Red Star	36	(1)
2021–2023	Toulon	44	(1)

International career
2010	France U18	1	(0)
2010–2011	France U19	6	(0)
- * Club domestic league appearances and goals as of 05:12, 18 April 2022 (UTC)

Jérémy Labor (born 19 March 1992) is a French professional footballer. Traditionally a centre-back, he can also be utilized on the side. He is a former France youth international, having represented his nation at under-18 and under-19 level.

== Club career ==
Labor was a member of the Monaco under-19 team that won the 2010–11 edition of the Coupe Gambardella and made his professional debut on 19 November 2011 in a Coupe de France match against Alès. A week later, he made his league debut in a 2–0 defeat to Nantes. In July 2013, he joined Belgian side RWDM Brussels along with his teammate Martin Sourzac on a loan deal.

In 2016, Labor moved to Indian I-League club DSK Shivajians.
