= Azzeddine Toufiqui =

French footballer (born 1999)

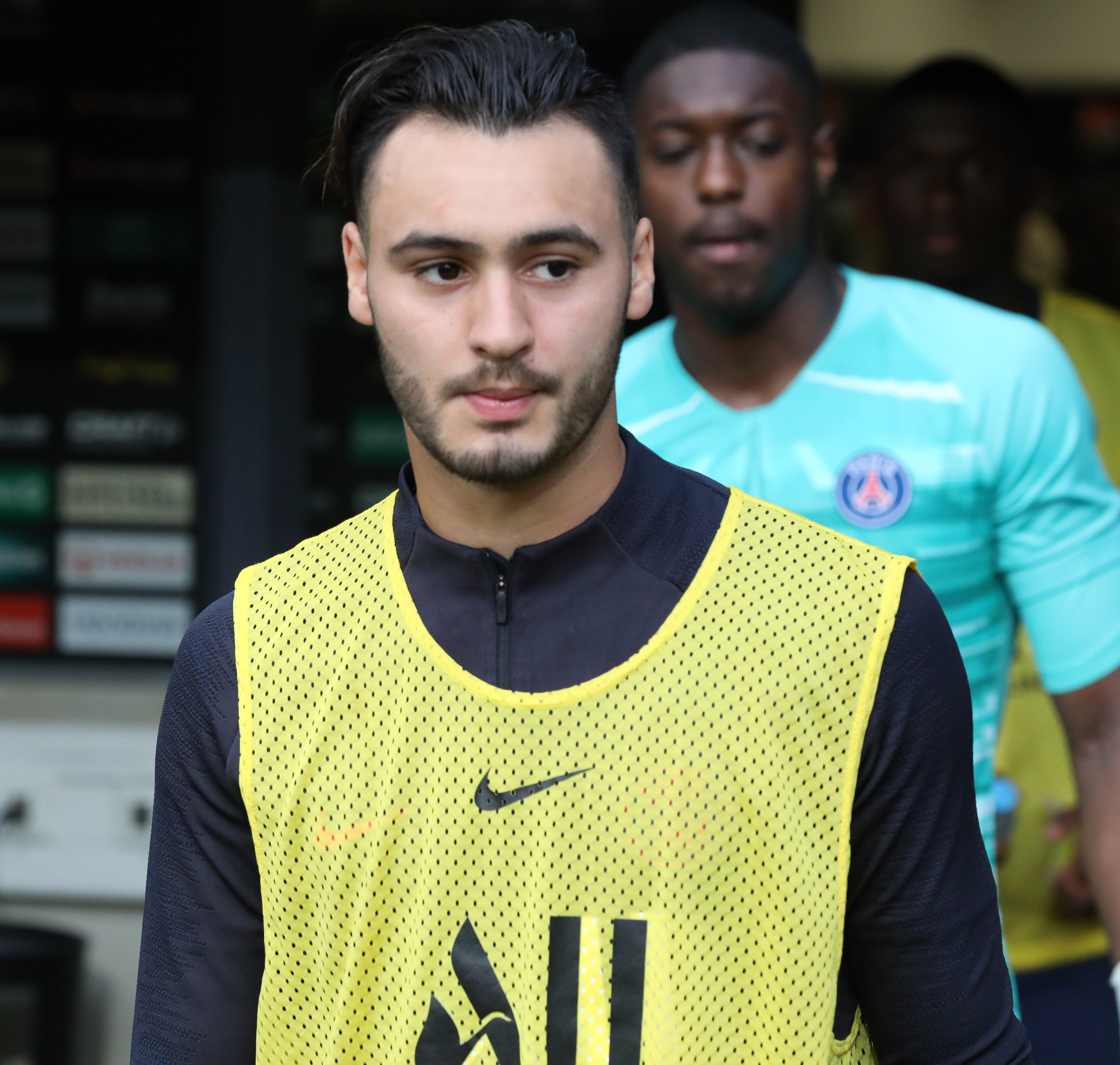
- Toufiqui with Paris Saint-Germain in 2019

Personal information
- Date of birth: 25 April 1999 (age 27)
- Place of birth: Caen, France
- Height: 1.75 m (5 ft 9 in)
- Position: Midfielder

Team information
- Current team: Pays du Valois

Youth career
- 2005–2015: SM Caen
- 2015–2017: Paris Saint-Germain

Senior career*
Years	Team	Apps	(Gls)
2017–2019	Paris Saint-Germain B	42	(3)
2019–2021	SM Caen	5	(0)
2019–2021	SM Caen B	14	(2)
2021–2023	Emmen	36	(3)
2024	AG Caen	11	(0)
2024–	Pays du Valois	18	(4)
- * Club domestic league appearances and goals as of 22 March 2025

Azzeddine Toufiqui (Arabic: عز الدين توفيقي; born 25 April 1999) is a French footballer who plays as a midfielder for Championnat National 3 club Pays du Valois.

== Career ==
=== Early career ===
Toufiqui spent a major part of his youth career in the academy of Caen before joining Paris Saint-Germain in 2015. From 2017 to 2019, he was part of club's reserve squad which played in the Championnat National 2. In February 2019, he was called up to senior team's matchday squad twice by Thomas Tuchel, but failed to get any playing minutes.

=== Caen ===
On 31 August 2019, Toufiqui's former club Caen announced his signing on a three-year deal. He made his professional debut two weeks later on 13 September, in a 2–1 loss against Troyes.

=== FC Emmen ===
In July 2021, Toufiqui signed for FC Emmen in the Netherlands.

== Personal life ==
Born to a Moroccan father and an Algerian mother in France, Toufiqui is eligible to represent all three countries. He is the younger brother of former French youth international Sabri Toufiqui.

== Honours ==
Emmen

- Eerste Divisie: 2021–22
