= Christophe Point =

French footballer (born 1965)

Personal information
- Date of birth: 26 May 1965 (age 61)
- Place of birth: Nantes, France
- Height: 1.82 m (6 ft 0 in)
- Position: Defender

Senior career*
| Years | Team | Apps | (Gls) |
| 1981–1995 | SM Caen | 276 | (13) |

Managerial career
- 1997–1998: SM Caen II
- 1998–2002: FC Bayeux
- 2002–2005: US Avranches
- 2013–2016: Dijon FCO (juniors)
- 2016–2018: AJ Auxerre II
- 2018–2019: Dijon FCO (juniors)
- * Club domestic league appearances and goals

Christophe Point (born 26 May 1965) is a French retired football defender.

Point spent his entire playing career of 14 years at Stade Malherbe Caen.
