= SC Hérouville =

- Full name: Sporting Club Hérouville
- Founded: 1970
- Chairman: Mohamed Belouadani
Home colours

SC Hérouville is a French football club based in Hérouville-Saint-Clair.

== History ==
The club was founded in 1970. the club spent most of its early life in the Calvados departmental leagues, until from 2004 to 2013 it achieved 5 promotions in nine seasons, culminating in being the DH Basse-Normandie champions and winning promotion to the Championnat National 2.

The club stayed in the CFA 2 division for two seasons, firstly winning a reprieve from relegation as other clubs at the level were relegated on administrative reasons instead. The following season saw the club relegated, back to Régional 1.

== Ground ==
The club play their home games at the stade Prestavoine. The ground was inaugurated in 2004.

== Honours ==
- DH Basse-Normandie (1) 2012-13
- Regional 2 Normandie group B (1) 2024-25

== Notable Players ==
- (Haiti) Hervé Bazile

== Notable Managers ==
- (France) Benjamin Morel
- (France) Jean-François Péron
