= Eysseric =

Eysseric is a French surname. Notable people with the surname include:

- Jonathan Eysseric (born 1990), French tennis player
- Valentin Eysseric (born 1992), French footballer
