= Matthias Jouan =

French footballer (born 1984)

Personal information
- Date of birth: February 4, 1984 (age 42)
- Place of birth: Caen, France
- Height: 1.76 m (5 ft 9 1/2 in)
- Position: Midfielder

Team information
- Current team: Rouen

Senior career*
Years	Team	Apps	(Gls)
2003–2004	Caen (B team)		
2004–2005	Caen	1	(0)
2005–2006	Mondeville		
2006–2007	Jura-Sud		
2007–2009	Quevilly		
2009–2010	Rouen	37	(4)
2010–2012	Quevilly	66	(12)
2012–2013	Carquefou	37	(0)
2013–2014	Rouen	11	(5)
2014–2016	US Granville	40	(2)
- * Club domestic league appearances and goals as of 4 March 2016

Matthias Jouan (born February 4, 1984) is a French professional football player. Currently, he plays for US Granville.

He played at the professional level in Ligue 1 for SM Caen.
