= Hamza Ould Jawar =

Mauritanian footballer, defender

Personal information
- Full name: Hamza Ould Jawar
- Date of birth: 11 July 1995 (age 31)
- Place of birth: Étampes (91)
- Height: 1.86 m (6 ft 1 in)
- Position: Defender

Team information
- Current team: Mondeville

Senior career*
Years	Team	Apps	(Gls)
2012–2017	Caen B	51	(3)
2017–2022	Mondeville		
2022–2025	AS Villers-Houlgate		
2025 -	AG Caen		

International career^{‡}
2016–	Mauritania	3	(0)
- * Club domestic league appearances and goals ‡ National team caps and goals as of 10:02, 6 June 2021 (UTC)

Hamza Ould Jawar (born 11 July 1995) is a Mauritanian professional footballer who plays as a defender. he currently plays for AG Caen.

He has played for Régional 1 club Mondeville, AS Villers-Houlgate and the Mauritania national team.

== International career ==
Jawar made his debut for Mauritania in a match on 29 March 2016 against the Gambia.

== Career statistics ==
As of match played 31 August 2017

Appearances and goals by national team and year
National team	Year	Apps	Goals
Mauritania	2016	2	0
Mauritania	2017	1	0
Total		3	0
