= Mustapha Traoré =

French footballer (born 1982)

Personal information
- Date of birth: 9 July 1982 (age 44)
- Place of birth: Paris, France
- Height: 1.85 m (6 ft 1 in)
- Position: Defender

Senior career*
Years	Team	Apps	(Gls)
2002–2005	USON Mondeville		
2005–2007	Caen	16	(0)
2007–2010	Caen B		
- Douvres-la-Délivrande
2013–?	CA Paris-Charenton		
- * Club domestic league appearances and goals

Mustapha Traoré (born 7 September 1982) is a French former professional footballer who played as a defender.

== Club career ==
Born in Paris, Traoré quit football because he performed badly at school. He began his career in 2002 with USON Mondeville in CFA 2. In 2005, he was transferred to Caen. At Caen he made his professional debut on 7 October 2005 in 2–0 away wine against Dijon. He signed his first professional contract in summer 2006.

In December 2006, with Brahim Thiam suspended, Traoré competed with Grégory Leca for a defensive partnership with Jérémy Sorbon. In May 2007, in his second season at Caen, Traoré suffered a double fracture of the tibia and fibula in the final match of the season. Seven months later, a cardiologist discovered a heart defect which necessitated an operation. In May 2008 Traoré received heart surgery and, having received medical clearance to play, played eight months later for Caen's reserves. He remained with the reserves until his contract ended.

Traoré subsequently joined a small club in the town of Douvres-la-Délivrande, playing in the Promotion d'honneur regional league. In 2013 he signed with CA Paris-Charenton in the seventh-tier Division Supérieure Régionale, joining up with coach Bienvenu Ngila who coached him at Mondeville and Caen.

== International career ==
Having returned to playing after a one-and-a-half-year break from playing in November 2008, making eight appearances for Caen's reserves in the Championnat de France Amateur, Traoré was called up to the Gambia national team's 20-man squad in February 2009, for a friendly match against Gabon.

== Style of play ==
Traoré made his debut for Caen at right-back but preferred playing centrally in defence or defensive midfield.

== Personal life ==
Traoré was born in Paris to a Malian mother and a Gambian father who arrived in France in 1975.

As of January 2014 he had one child.

== Honours ==
Caen

- Ligue 2: runner-up 2006–07
