= Nasser Larguet =

Moroccan football manager

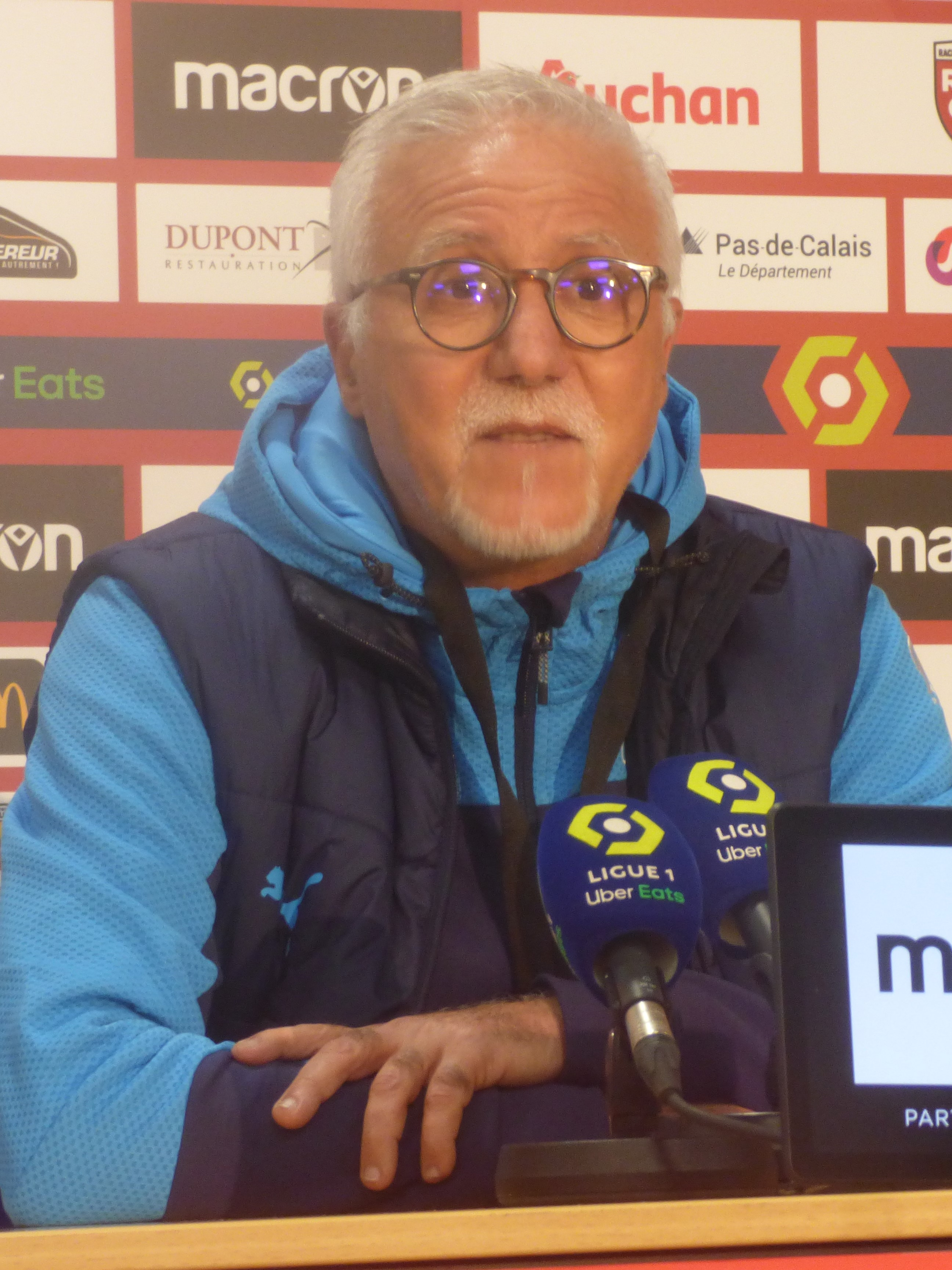
- Larguet with Marseille in 2021

Personal information
- Date of birth: 6 November 1958 (age 67)
- Place of birth: Sidi Slimane, Morocco

Senior career*
| Years | Team | Apps | (Gls) |
| 1980–1982 | ASPTT Caen | | |
| 1982–1986 | Normande | | |
| 1986–1989 | Thury-Harcourt | | |

Managerial career
- 1986–1989: Thury-Harcourt
- 2002–2004: Le Havre II
- 2021: Marseille (interim)
- 2022–2026: Saudi Arabia (technical director)
- * Club domestic league appearances and goals

Nasser Larguet (Arabic: ناصر لارغيت, born 6 November 1958) is a Moroccan football coach, former head of the academy for Marseille. He was briefly the interim coach of the Marseille senior team.

== Managerial career ==
Larguet was born in Morocco, and played football recreationally as a teenager. He moved to France to continue his studies in microbiology at the University of Caen Normandy, but was a part-time amateur footballer with ASPTT Caen, Normande, and Thury-Harcourt. At Thury-Harcourt, Larguet was appointed player coach, where he began his managerial career.

Larguet eventually became the director of football for various clubs in France, including Rouen, Cannes, Caen, and Strasbourg, and also had a stint as manager of the reserves of Le Havre from 2003 to 2004. From 2008 to 2014, he was appointed director of the Mohammed VI Football Academy. He was a technical director for the Morocco national team from 2014 to 2019.

On 28 June 2019, he was hired as the head of the academy of Marseille. In February 2021, he was appointed interim manager of Marseille after André Villas-Boas handed in his resignation. Larguet was succeeded in his role by Jorge Sampaoli.

On 25 April 2022, Marseille and Larguet parted ways after the club announced the departure of its current director of academy "for personal reasons", taking effect the following week on 2 May 2022.

== Managerial statistics ==
| Team | From | To | Record | | | | | | | |
| Team | From | To | M | W | D | L | GF | GA | GD | Win % |
|---|---|---|---|---|---|---|---|---|---|---|
| Marseille | 2 February 2021 | 7 March 2021 | 9 | 2 | 4 | 3 | 10 | 12 | –2 | 22.22 |
| Total | | | 9 | 2 | 4 | 3 | 10 | 12 | –2 | 22.22 |
