= Ahmed Tangeaoui =

French-Moroccan football striker (born 1982)

Personal information
- Full name: Ahmed Tangeaoui
- Date of birth: 29 May 1982 (age 44)
- Place of birth: Dreux, France
- Position: Striker

Team information
- Current team: Évreux FC
- Number: 9

Youth career
- –2000: SM Caen

Senior career*
Years	Team	Apps	(Gls)
2000–2003	SM Caen		
2003–2004	Évreux AC		
2004–2005	FC Bayeux		
2005–2006	Beauvais	33	(24)
2006–2007	Angers	43	(10)
2008	Dubai Club	6	(0)
2008–2009	Paris FC	7	(2)
2009–	Évreux FC		

International career
1997–1998	France U-17	7	(2)
2000–2002	Maroc u-20	18	(0)
- * Club domestic league appearances and goals

Ahmed Tangeaoui (born 29 May 1982) is a French-Moroccan football striker. He currently plays for Évreux FC.

== Career ==
Tangeaoui began his career with SM Caen before moving to Championnat de France Amateurs 2 team Évreux AC in 2003. In the summer of 2004 he moved to league rival FC Bayeux, leaving the team in 2005 to join Beauvais. He played in Ligue 2 for Angers SCO after signing with AS Beauvais Oise in the summer of 2006.

In January 2008, Tangeaoui signed with the Emirati club Dubai Club, but left after 6 months to return to France upon signing a contract with Paris FC. In July 2009, he returned to Évreux after Paris FC passed on signing him to a new contract.
