= Joël Germain =

French footballer (born 1964)

Personal information
- Date of birth: 7 December 1964 (age 61)
- Place of birth: Montbéliard
- Height: 1.84 m (6 ft 0 in)
- Position: Defender

Senior career*
Years	Team	Apps	(Gls)
1981–1986	Racing Besançon		
1986–1988	Louhans-Cuiseaux		
1988–1990	Orléans		
1990–1995	Caen		
1995–1996	Lille		
1996–1998	Reims		

Managerial career
- 2000-2004: Orléans
- FC Chartres
- 2009-2012: Bayeux Football Club
- * Club domestic league appearances and goals

Joël Germain (born 7 December 1964) is a retired French football defender.

After retiring from playing he went on to manage US Orléans, FC Chartres and Bayeux Football Club.
