= Electoral history of Cynthia McKinney =

List of elections featuring Cynthia McKinney as a candidate

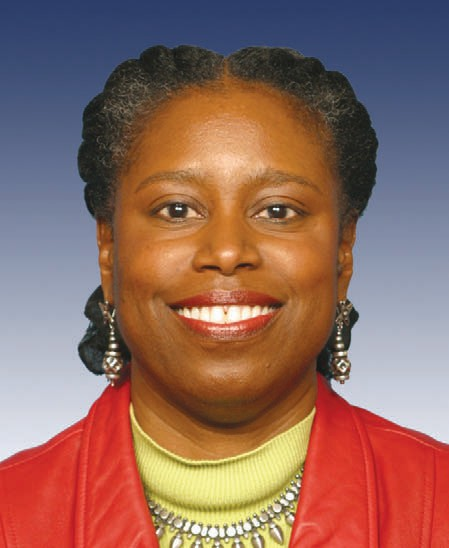
Former Representative Cynthia McKinney of Georgia

Electoral history of Cynthia McKinney, Democratic Representative from Georgia 11th and 4th congressional district (1993–2003, 2003–2005), and 2008 Green Party Presidential nominee.

== Congressional races ==
=== 1992 election ===
Georgia's 11th congressional district election, 1992 primary
Party	Candidate	Votes	%
Democratic	Cynthia McKinney	26,160	31.19
Democratic	George L. Deloach	21,122	25.19
Democratic	Eugene Walker	18,805	22.42
Democratic	Mike Thurmond	12,847	15.87
Democratic	Verdree Lockhart	4,468	5.33
Total votes		83,868	100
Runoff election
Democratic	Cynthia McKinney	39,301	56.39
Democratic	George L. Deloach	30,389	43.61
Total votes		69,690	100

Georgia's 11th congressional district election, 1992
Party	Candidate	Votes	%
Democratic	Cynthia McKinney	120,168	73.10
Republican	Woodrow Lovett	44,221	26.90
No party	(write-in)	11	0.0
Total votes		164,400	100
Democratic hold			

=== 1994 election ===
Georgia's 11th congressional district election, 1994
Party	Candidate	Votes	%
Democratic	Cynthia McKinney (incumbent)	71,560	65.60
Republican	Woodrow Lovett	37,533	34.41
Total votes		109,093	100
Democratic hold			

=== 1996 election ===
Georgia's 11th congressional district election, 1996 primary
Party	Candidate	Votes	%
Democratic	Cynthia McKinney (incumbent)	42,508	67.48
Democratic	Comer Yates	15,126	24.00
Democratic	Ron Slotin		15.87
Democratic	Verdree Lockhart	4,468	5.33
Total votes		83,868	100

Georgia's 11th congressional district election, 1996
Party	Candidate	Votes	%
Democratic	Cynthia McKinney (incumbent)	127,157	57.76
Republican	John M. Mitnick	92.985	42.24
Total votes		220,142	100
Democratic gain from Republican			

=== 1998 election ===
Georgia's 4th congressional district election, 1998
Party	Candidate	Votes	%
Democratic	Cynthia McKinney (incumbent)	100,622	61.07
Republican	Sunny Warren	64,146	38.93
No party	(write-in)	4	0.0
Total votes		164,772	100
Democratic hold			

=== 2000 election ===
Georgia's 4th congressional district election, 2000
Party	Candidate	Votes	%
Democratic	Cynthia McKinney (incumbent)	139,579	60.73
Republican	Sunny Warren	90,277	39.28
Total votes		229,856	100
Democratic hold			

=== 2002 election ===
Georgia's 4th congressional district election, 2002 primary
Party	Candidate	Votes	%
Democratic	Denise Majette	68,612	58.31
Democratic	Cynthia McKinney (incumbent)	49,058	41.69
Total votes		117,670	100

=== 2004 election ===
Georgia's 4th congressional district election, 2004 primary
Party	Candidate	Votes	%
Democratic	Cynthia McKinney	48,512	50.88
Democratic	Liane Levetan	19,723	20.68
Democratic	Cathy Woolard	17,949	18.82
Democratic	Connie Stokes	4,972	5.21
Democratic	Nadine Thomas	2,938	3.08
Democratic	Chris Vaughn	1,260	1.32
Total votes		95,384	100

Georgia's 4th congressional district election, 2004
Party	Candidate	Votes	%
Democratic	Cynthia McKinney	157,461	63.76
Republican	Catherine Davis	89,509	36.24
Total votes		246,970	100
Democratic hold			

=== 2006 election ===
Georgia's 4th congressional district election, 2006 primary
Party	Candidate	Votes	%
Democratic	Cynthia McKinney (incumbent)	29,216	47.12
Democratic	Hank Johnson	27,516	44.40
Democratic	John Coyne	5,253	8.47
Total votes		61,998	100
Runoff election
Democratic	Hank Johnson	41,281	58.81
Democratic	Cynthia McKinney (incumbent)	28,915	41.19
Total votes		70,196	100
Democratic hold			

=== 2012 election ===
Georgia's 4th congressional district election, 2012 primary
Party	Candidate	Votes	%
Democratic	Hank Johnson (incumbent)	208,861	73.55
Republican	Chris Vaughn	75,041	26.43
Green	Cynthia McKinney (write-in)	58	0.02
Total votes		283,960	100

== Presidential races ==
Peace and Freedom Party presidential primary in California, 2008:

- Ralph Nader - 2,543 (40.00%)
- Cynthia McKinney - 1,353 (21.28%)
- Gloria La Riva - 1,335 (21.00%)
- Brian Moore - 346 (5.44%)
- John R. Crockford - 339 (5.33%)
- Stewart Alexander - 335 (5.27%)
- Stanley Martin Hetz - 107 (1.68%)

Peace and Freedom Party Convention (Presidential tally), 2008:

- Ralph Nader - 46 (51.69%)
- Gloria La Riva - 27 (30.34%)
- Brian Moore - 10 (11.24%)
- Cynthia McKinney - 6 (6.74%)

Green Party National Convention, 2008:

- Cynthia McKinney - 324 (59.56%)
- Ralph Nader - 78 (14.34%)
- Kat Swift - 39 (7.17%)
- Kent P. Mesplay - 35 (6.43%)
- Jesse Johnson - 33 (6.07%)
- Elaine Brown - 9 (1.65%)
- Jared Ball - 8 (1.47%)
- Howie Hawkins - 8 (1.47%)
- None of the above - 7 (1.29%)
- Uncommitted - 2 (0.37%)
- Undecided - 1 (0.18%)

Green Party 2008 ticket:

- Former Representative Cynthia McKinney of Georgia for President: 161,603 votes
- Activist Rosa Clemente of New York for Vice President

== See also ==
- Cynthia McKinney presidential campaign, 2008
- Political positions of Cynthia McKinney
- Electoral history of Bob Barr (Libertarian nominee)
- Electoral history of Barack Obama (Democratic nominee)
- Electoral history of John McCain (Republican nominee)
- Electoral history of Ralph Nader (Independent candidate)
- Electoral history of Kamala Harris (Democratic nominee)
