= Electoral history of Bob Barr =

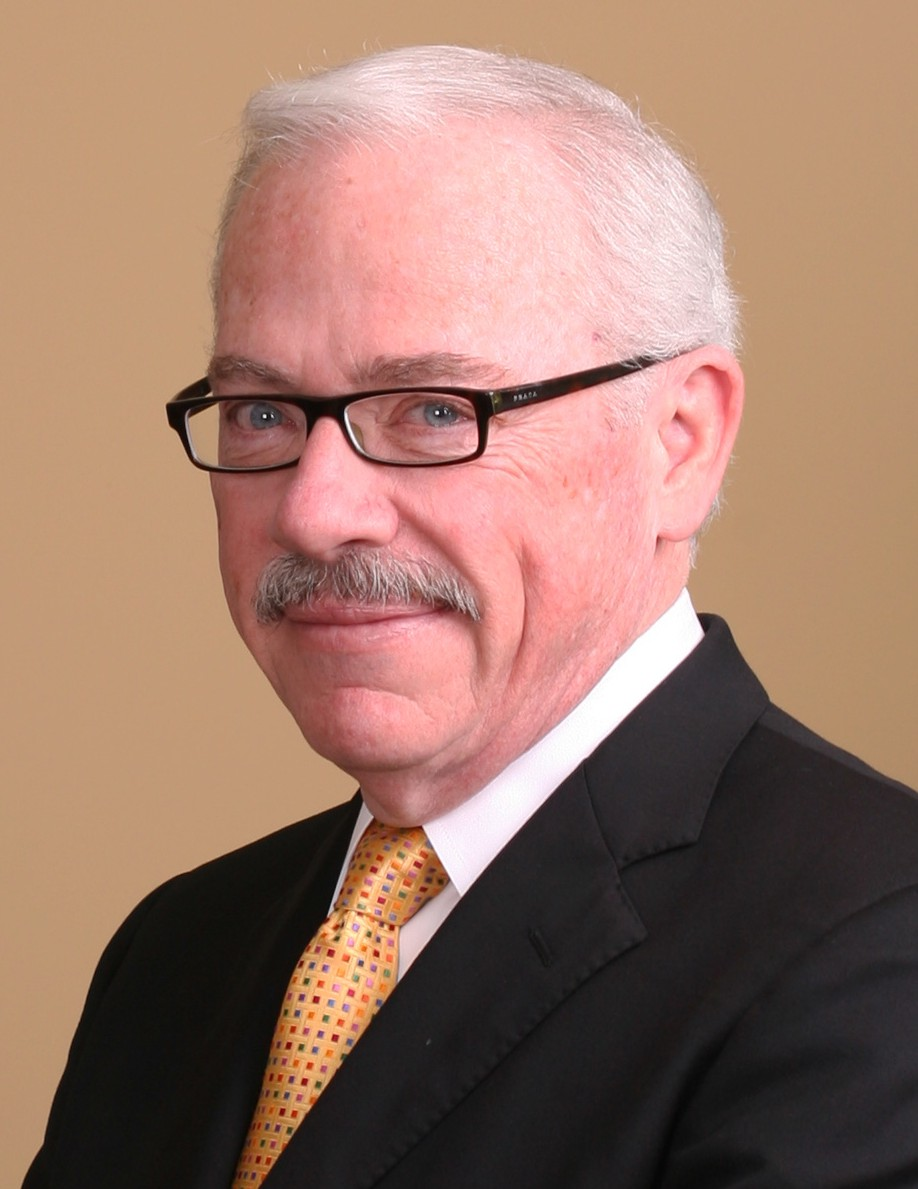
Former Representative Bob Barr

Electoral history of Bob Barr, Republican Representative from Georgia (1995–2003) and Libertarian Party presidential nominee in 2008 election.

== Senate and House races (1992–2002) ==
Republican primary for the United States Senate from Georgia, 1992:

- Paul Coverdell – 100,016 (37.1%)
- Bob Barr – 65,471 (24.3%)
- John Knox – 64,514 (23.9%)
- Charlie Tanksley – 32,590 (12.1%)
- Dean Parkinson – 7,352 (2.7%)

Republican primary runoff for the United States Senate from Georgia, 1992:

- Paul Coverdell – 80,435 (50.5%)
- Bob Barr – 78,887 (49.5%)

Georgia's 7th congressional district, 1994 (Republican primary):

- Bob Barr – 16,165 (57.0%)
- Brenda Fitzgerald – 12,217 (43.1%)

Georgia's 7th congressional district, 1994:

- Bob Barr (R) – 71,265 (51.9%)
- Buddy Darden (D) (inc.) – 65,978 (48.1%)

Georgia's 7th congressional district, 1996:

- Bob Barr (R) (inc.) – 112,009 (57.8%)
- Charlie Watts (D) – 81,765 (42.2%)

Georgia's 7th congressional district, 1998:

- Bob Barr (R) (inc.) – 85,982 (55.4%)
- James F. Williams (D) – 69,293 (44.6%)

Georgia's 7th congressional district, 2000:

- Bob Barr (R) (inc.) – 126,312 (55.3%)
- Roger Kahn (D) – 102,272 (44.7%)

Georgia's 7th congressional district, 2002 (Republican primary):

- John Linder (inc.) – 56,893 (64.5%)
- Bob Barr (inc.) – 31,377 (35.6%)

Note: Linder, incumbent from 11th district, ran against 7th district incumbent Barr due to districts borders changes

== United States presidential election, 2008 ==
2008 Libertarian National Convention:

First ballot:

- Bob Barr – 153
- Mary Ruwart – 152
- Wayne Allyn Root – 123
- Mike Gravel – 71
- George Phillies – 49
- Steve Kubby – 41
- Michael Jingozian – 23
- Ron Paul – 6
- Christine Smith – 6
- Penn Jillette – 3
- Daniel Imperato – 1
- William Koehler – 1
- None of the above – 2

Second ballot:

- Bob Barr – 188
- Mary Ruwart – 162
- Wayne Allyn Root – 138
- Mike Gravel – 71
- George Phillies – 38
- Steve Kubby – 32
- Ron Paul – 3
- Stephen Colbert – 1
- Jesse Ventura – 1
- None of the above – 1

Third ballot:

- Bob Barr – 186
- Mary Ruwart – 186
- Wayne Allyn Root – 146
- Mike Gravel – 71
- George Phillies – 31
- Ron Paul – 1
- None of the above – 2

Fourth ballot:

- Bob Barr – 202
- Mary Ruwart – 202
- Wayne Allyn Root – 149
- Mike Gravel – 76
- None of the above – 2

Fifth ballot:

- Mary Ruwart – 229
- Bob Barr – 223
- Wayne Allyn Root – 165
- None of the above – 6

Sixth ballot:

- Bob Barr – 324
- Mary Ruwart – 276
- Ralph Nader – 1
- Ron Paul – 1
- None of the above – 26

2008 Libertarian ticket:

- Former Representative Bob Barr of Georgia for President
- Wayne Allyn Root of New York for Vice President

== See also ==
- Bob Barr presidential campaign, 2008
- Political positions of Bob Barr
- Electoral history of Barack Obama (Democratic nominee)
- Electoral history of John McCain (Republican nominee)
- Electoral history of Cynthia McKinney (Green nominee)
- Electoral history of Ralph Nader (Independent candidate)
- Electoral history of Kamala Harris (Democratic nominee)
