= Bayeux Football Club =

Football club in Normandy, France

Bayeux FC
- Full name: Bayeux Football Club
- Founded: 1998
- Ground: Stade Henry-Jeanne
- Capacity: 3,444
- Chairman: Luis Ferreira-Pavesi
- Manager: Éric Fouda
- League: Régional 1
Home colours

Bayeux Football Club is a French football club based in Bayeux.

== History ==
The club was formed from the merger of AS Bayeux, SL Bayeux, and AS Rives de l'Aure in 1998.

The club managed to reach the Championnat National 2 for the 2003–04 season, and remained there for 3 seasons, being relegated back to the Regional league.

At the end of the 2016–17 season teh club won a play-off against Grand-Quevilly, securing a promotion to the Championnat National 3. They remained in the league until the end of teh 2018–19 season and were relegated back down to teh regional league again.

== Ground ==
The club play there home games at Stade Henry-Jeanne. The stadium has a total capacity of 3,444 of which 444 is seated.

== Honours ==
- DH Basse-Normandie (1) 2000-01
- Coupe de Basse-Normandie (2) 1998–99, 2014-15

== Notable Players ==
- (Algeria) (France) Noureddine Kourichi (for AS Bayeux)
- (Morocco) (France) Ahmed Tangeaoui
- (France) Jean-François Péron
- (France) Benjamin Morel
- (Senegal) Amath Diedhiou

== Notable Managers ==
- (France) Joël Germain
- (France) Sébastien Mazure
- (France) Christophe Point
