= AG Caen =

- Full name: Avant-Garde Caennaise
- Nickname: L'avant-Garde
- Founded: 1902
- Ground: Stade IUT Caen Nord 2
- Chairman: Deloffre Cyril
- Manager: Benjamin Morel
- League: Régional 1
Home colours

AG Caen is a French football club based in Caen. The club are currently playing in the Régional 1. The football club is part of a multi sport club.

== History ==
The multi sports club was formed in 1902, and the football section was created in 1906.

In 2017 the club collaborated with United Managers that allowed subscribers of the app to co-manage the team. At its height the club had 4,000 managers, but it was discontinued in 2020.

At the end of the 2019 season the club won promotion to the Championnat National 3 as champions of Régional 1.

They stayed in the Championnat National 3 until the end of the 2024-25 season when they finished bottom of the league and relegated back to Regional 1.

== Ground ==
The club play their home games at the Stade IUT Caen Nord.

== Honours ==
DH Basse-Normandie (1) 2018-19

== Notable players ==
- (France) Benjamin Morel
- (Mauritania) Hamza Ould Jawar
- (France) Azzeddine Toufiqui
- (France) (Republic of the Congo) Clévid Dikamona
- (Guadeloupe) Kevin Sainte-Luce
- (France) Kévin Goba

== Notable Managers ==
- (France) Benjamin Morel
