= ASPTT Caen =

- Full name: Association Sportive des Postes, Télégraphes et Téléphones de Caen Football
- Nickname: Postiers
- Founded: 1929
- Ground: Stade Maurice Fouque
- Chairman: Guénaël Le Strat
- Manager: Laurent Dufour
- League: Championnat National 2
Home colours

ASPTT Caen is a French football club based in Caen. The club are currently playing in the Championnat National 2.

== History ==
The club was founded in 1929 by the postal workers of Caen. The football team was the first active area of the multi sports club.

At the end of the 1998-99 season under Philippe Lesaunier, the team reached the CFA2, but could only spend one season in the higher league.

The club achieved promotion back to the CFA 2 at the end of the 2014-15 season under manager Laurent Dufour. Since then the club has floated between the Regional and CFA 2 division.

== Ground ==
The club play their home games at the Stade Maurice Fouque. The stadium was named after Maurice Fouque founder of the basketball section of the club, who was a French Resistance member killed by the Gestapo in 1944 and posthumously awarded the Resistance Medal in 1955.

== Honours ==
- DH Normandie (1) 1974-75
- DH Basse-Normandie (5) 1983-84, 1998-99, 2014-15, 2017-18, 2025-26
- DSR Basse-Normandie (2) 2011-12, 2013-14
- DHR Basse-Normandie (1) 1971-72
- PH Basse-Normandie (1) 1970-71
- Coupe de Basse-Normandie (2) 1992-93, 2011-12

== Notable players ==
- (Morocco) Nasser Larguet
- (France) Patrice Lecornu

== Notable Managers ==
- (France) Jean-François Péron
