= Benjamin Morel =

French footballer (born 1987)

Personal information
- Full name: Benjamin Thomas Romain Morel
- Date of birth: 10 June 1987 (age 39)
- Place of birth: Caen, France
- Height: 1.80 m (5 ft 11 in)
- Position: Winger

Senior career*
Years	Team	Apps	(Gls)
- Association sportive d'Ifs
2008–2009	Alençon		
2009–2010	Dives		
2010–2012	Caen	8	(0)
2010–2011	→ Caen II	23	(6)
2012	Clermont Foot	15	(2)
2012–2013	Amiens	6	(0)
2012	→ Amiens II	3	(2)
2013	Bayeux FC		
2013–2014	Granville		
2014–2015	Domžale	48	(9)
2016	Beroe Stara Zagora	3	(0)
2016	Domžale	8	(2)
2016–2018	USON Mondeville		
2018–2019	AG Caennaise		
2019–2020	USON Mondeville		

Managerial career
- 2025-26: SC Hérouville
- 2026-: AG Caen
- * Club domestic league appearances and goals

Benjamin Thomas Romain Morel (born 10 June 1987) is a retired French footballer who played as a winger. He is now manager of AG Caen.

== Playing Career ==
On 1 February 2016 he signed with the Bulgarian team Beroe Stara Zagora after two weeks trial. On 5 June 2016 he returned to Domžale. He terminated his contract with Domžale on 1 October 2016, after his wife became pregnant and returned to France to be closer to family, joining USON Mondeville.

== Manager Career ==
He became coach of SC Hérouville in the summer of 2025 before leaving in January 2026 to manage AG Caen

== Career statistics ==
As of 31 September 2016

Club	Season	League			Cup		Europe		Total	
Club	Season	Division	Apps	Goals	Apps	Goals	Apps	Goals	Apps	Goals
Caen	2011–12	Ligue 1	8	0	0	0	—		8	0
Caen	2012–13	Ligue 1	0	0	0	0	—		0	0
Caen	Total		8	0	0	0	0	0	8	0
Clermont Foot	2013–14	Ligue 2	15	2	0	0	—		15	2
Amiens	2014–15	National	6	0	0	0	—		6	0
Domžale	2014–15	1. SNL	32	7	6	0	—		38	7
Domžale	2015–16	1. SNL	16	2	2	1	2	0	20	3
Domžale	Total		48	9	8	1	2	0	58	10
Beroe Stara Zagora	2015–16	A Group	3	0	0	0	—		3	0
Domžale	2016–17	1. SNL	8	2	0	0	6	1	14	3
Career total			88	13	8	1	8	1	104	15
