= USON Mondeville =

French football club

- Full name: Union Sportive Ouvrière Normande de Mondeville
- Founded: 1991
- Ground: Stade Michel Farré, Mondeville
- Capacity: 2,500
- Chairman: Karim Bouaziz
- League: Regional 2 Normandy
- 2025-26: Régional 1 (Normandy) Group B, 12th (relegated)
Home colours

Union Sportive Ouvrière Normande de Mondeville is a French association football club founded in 1991. They are based in the town of Mondeville and their home stadium is the Stade Michel Farré.

== History ==
The club was formed in 1991 as a merger of two clubs USO Mondeville and US Normande.

The club was playing at the Championnat National 3 level; but at the end of the 2018–19 season, they were demoted to the Regional 1 Normandy due to being administratively relegated from Championnat National 3 after finishing 2nd in their group.

== Stadium ==
The club play their home games at the Stade Michel Farré. The stadium has a capacity of 2302, with 402 of that being seating and the other 1900 is for standing. The stadium was built in 1936. The stadium is named after a local French Resistance fighter, who died in 1941.

== Honours ==
- CFA 2 - Division Champions (2) 1999-00 & 2003-04
- DH Basse-Normandie (2) 1994-95, 2016-17
- Coupe de Basse-Normandie (2) 2002-03, 2016-17

== Former players ==
- (Morocco) Nasser Larguet (as US Normande)
- (France) Yohann Eudeline
- (France) Mustapha Traoré
- (France) Julian Cherel
- (France) Matthias Jouan
- (Mauritania) (France) Oumar N'Diaye
- (France) Benjamin Morel
- (France) Thomas Bosmel
- (Senegal) Ismaïla N'Diaye
- (Mauritania) (France) Hamza Ould Jawar
- (Guadeloupe) (France) Johan Rotsen

== Notable Managers ==
- (France) Jean-François Péron
