= Éric Boucher =

French footballer (born 1958)

Personal information
- Full name: Éric Boucher
- Date of birth: December 1, 1958 (age 67)
- Place of birth: Le Bouscat, France
- Height: 1.75 m (5 ft 9 in)
- Position: Defender

Senior career*
Years	Team	Apps	(Gls)
1977–1983	Bordeaux	4	(0)
1983–1986	Lyon	96	(0)
1986–1988	Chamois Niortais	63	(3)
- * Club domestic league appearances and goals

Éric Boucher (born December 1, 1958, in Le Bouscat, France) is a former professional footballer.

== Career ==
After beginning his career with French Division 2 side Lyon, Boucher joined Niort. He helped the club gain promotion to the French Division 1, and he scored his first top-flight goal in the 1987–88 season against AS Saint-Étienne.

After he retired from playing football, Boucher was the mayor of Fraisnes-en-Saintois.
