= 2023–24 Coupe de France preliminary rounds, Pays de la Loire =

Football tournament round

The 2023–24 Coupe de France preliminary rounds, Pays de la Loire is the qualifying competition to decide which teams from the leagues of the Pays de la Loire region of France take part in the main competition from the seventh round.

A total of eleven teams will qualify from the Pays de la Loire section of the 2023–24 Coupe de France preliminary rounds.

In 2022–23, Les Herbiers VF progressed furthest in the main competition, reaching the round of 32, where they lost to Stade de Reims.

== Draws and fixtures ==
On 29 June 2023, the league confirmed that 510 teams from the region had entered the competition. On 25 July 2023, confirmed that 418 teams would enter at the first round stage, from the departmental and regional division, with 16 teams from Régional 3 being exempted to the second round. The second round draw was made on 28 August 2023 by the league, with the remaining Régional 3 sides and the sides from Régional 2 entering at this stage. The third round draw was published on 6 September 2023, with the 18 teams from Régional 1 and 10 from Championnat National 3 joining the competition at this stage.

The fourth round draw, featuring the four teams from Championnat National 2, was carried out on 26 September 2023. The fifth round draw, featuring two teams from Championnat National, was carried out on 3 October 2023. The sixth and final regional round was drawn on 18 October 2023.

=== First round ===
These matches were played on 26 and 27 August 2023.

First Round Results: Pays de la Loire
Tie no	Home team (Tier)	Score	Away team (Tier)
1.	FC Garnachois (10)	2–2 (4–3 p)	FC Côteaux du Vignoble (8)
2.	AS Vaiges (9)	0–4	CS Lion d'Angers (8)
3.	AS Meslay-du-Maine (8)	1–2	FC Longuenée-en-Anjou (9)
4.	ASPTT Laval (9)	1–1 (2–3 p) (Note: Intrépide Angers Foot penalised for fielding a suspended player, ASPTT Laval qualify.)	Intrépide Angers Foot (8)
5.	AS Lac de Maine (8)	2–3	JS Laval Maghreb (9)
6.	ASL L'Huisserie Foot (9)	3–3 (5–4 p)	USA Pouancé (8)
7.	FC Pouëze-Saint-Clément-Brain (10)	3–1	US Dionysienne (9)
8.	AS Chazé-Vern (11)	0–3	FC Château-Gontier (8)
9.	US Combrée-Bel-Air-Noyant (9)	2–2 (2–4 p)	US Méral-Cossé (8)
10.	Olympique Bécon-Villemoisan-Saint-Augustin (9)	2–2 (5–3 p)	Athletic Laigné-Loigné (8)
11.	SSJA Saint-Mathurin (11)	2–4	ES Belleville-sur-Vie (9)
12.	US Autize Vendée (10)	0–3	Sèvremont FC (8)
13.	Entente Saint-Paul Maché (11)	1–1 (2–4 p)	Écureils des Pays de Monts (9)
14.	US Vouvant Bourneau Cezais (12)	0–4	US Saint-Michel Triaize La Tranche Angles (9)
15.	AS Damvitaise (12)	0–7	Pays de Chantonnay Foot (8)
16.	JF Boissière-des-Landes (11)	2–2 (3–4 p)	FC La Génétouze (8)
17.	AS Nord Est Anjou (11)	0–3	US Mansigné (9)
18.	Gazélec Le Mans (9)	1–0	FC Pellouailles-Corze (8)
19.	US Villaines-Malicorne (9)	0–4	SC Angevin (10)
20.	AC Belle Beille Angers (13)	0–9	AS Juigné-sur-Sarthe (9)
21.	Saint-Barthélémy-d'Anjou Foot (10)	2–1	US Bazouges-Cré (8)
22.	Saint MathMénitRé FC (10)	1–2	AS Clermont-Créans (8)
23.	Aiglons Durtalois (11)	1–5	EG Rouillon (8)
24.	ES Andard-Brain (9)	3–1	FC Saint-Georges-Pruillé (9)
25.	SS Noyen-sur-Sarthe (9)	0–1	ES Morannes (10)
26.	US Guécélard (9)	3–0	FC Villevêque-Soucelles (10)
27.	US Breilloise (11)	1–4	US Challes-Grand Lucé (10)
28.	Football Champagné Sport (10)	0–4	SA Mamertins (8)
29.	FC Pays de Sillé (10)	0–0 (9–8 p)	US Pré-en-Pail (9)
30.	AS Saint-Jean-d'Assé (10)	1–1 (1–3 p)	USC Pays de Montsurs (8)
31.	SC Trangé-Chaufour-Degré (10)	1–2	AS Contest-Saint Baudelle (8)
32.	ÉS Connerré (11)	0–5	US Bouloire (9)
33.	CA Loué (9)	3–1	Louverné Sports (8)
34.	USJA Saint-Martin-Aviré-Louvaine (10)	0–5	US Saint-Pierre Port-Brillet (9)
35.	US Bazoges Beaurepaire (10)	1–2	AS Longeron-Torfou (9)
36.	Gaubretière-Saint-Martin FC (11)	0–4	SomloirYzernay CPF (9)
37.	US Mesnard-Vendrennes (11)	0–9	ES Montilliers (8)
38.	JFF Cholet (10)	0–4	FC Mouchamps-Rochetrejoux (8)
39.	Saint-Georges Guyonnière FC (10)	0–2	Saint-Georges Trémentines FC (9)
40.	Andrezé-Jub-Jallais FC (9)	1–1 (5–4 p)	FC Bouaine Rocheservière (8)
41.	AS Le-Puy-Saint-Bonnet (9)	3–2	FC Cécilien Martinoyen (8)
42.	AS Bouchamps-lès-Craon (10)	1–11	Olympique Liré-Drain (8)
43.	US Le Genest (10)	3–2	SC Sainte-Gemmes-d'Andigné (9)
44.	AS La Chapelle-Craonnaise (12)	0–6	AS Val-d'Erdre-Auxence (10)
45.	US Aronnaise (9)	2–3	US Alpes Mancelles (10)
46.	Olympique Saint-Cyrien (12)	0–16	FC Rouez-Crissé (11)
47.	US Forcé (9)	1–4	Beaumont SA (8)
48.	FF Mortagne-sur-Sèvre (10)	2–0	FC Laurentais Landemontais (9)
49.	Val de Sèvre Football (10)	7–2	ARC Tillières (11)
50.	Aubry Chaudron FC (11)	0–0 (5–6 p)	FC Saint-Laurent Malvent (9)
51.	Les Farfadets Saint-Paul-en-Pareds (11)	1–7	Christophe-Séguinière (8)
52.	US Les Epesses-Saint-Mars (10)	1–1 (5–4 p)	US Toutlemonde Maulévrier (10)
53.	AS Bruffière Defontaine (10)	1–0	Olympique Sal-Tour Vézins Coron (10)
54.	Saint-Martin Treize Septiers (10)	1–2	Saint-Pierre Mazières (8)
55.	ES La Romagne-Roussay (10)	0–1	RS Ardelay (9)
56.	ES Longevillaise (11)	1–1 (4–5 p)	AS Quatre Vents Fontaines (10)
57.	FC Saint-Julien-Vairé (11)	1–3	Étoile de Vie Le Fenouiller (9)
58.	FC Nieul-Maillezais-Les Autises (10)	4–4 (4–5 p)	US Bournezeau-Saint-Hilaire (9)
59.	FC Saint-Philbert-Réorthe-Jaudonnière (11)	4–3	BoupèreMonProuant FC (9)
60.	AS Sigournais-Saint Germain (11)	0–0 (3–1 p)	FC Mouilleron-Thouarsais-Caillère (9)
61.	ES Pineaux (11)	0–2	FC Saligny (9)
62.	ES Varennes Villebernier (11)	0–4	Saint-Melaine OS (9)
63.	FC Bout' Loire-et-Evre (10)	1–0	FC Val de Moine (10)
64.	US Saint-Georges-sur-Loire (11)	0–2	Maybéléger FC (10)
65.	Olympique Saint-Gemmes-sur-Loire (9)	0–3	AS Saint-Hilaire-Vihiers-Saint-Paul (8)
66.	AS Ponts-de-Cé (11)	2–0	ASVR Ambillou-Château (10)
67.	UF Allonnes-Brain-sur-Allonnes (9)	1–1 (5–3 p)	Angers Vaillante Foot (8)
68.	JS Solesmienne (10)	1–0	USC Corné (11)
69.	AS Montmirail-Melleray (11)	2–5	AS Neuville-sur-Sarthe (10)
70.	AS Étival (10)	0–8	US Vibraysienne (8)
71.	ES Champfleur (10)	0–2	AS Martigné-sur-Mayenne (8)
72.	US Conlie Domfront (10)	1–3	US Laval (8)
73.	US Tennie-Saint-Symphorien (11)	1–2	US Entrammes (8)
74.	US La Chapelle-d'Aligné (10)	0–1	AS Avrillé (10)
75.	Internationale du Mans (9)	1–2	ES Moncé (8)
76.	AS Le Bailleul Crosmières (10)	1–3	AC Longué (11)
77.	JS Ludoise (10)	2–3	Écommoy FC (8)
78.	Fillé Sports (11)	0–4	AS Saint-Sylvain-d'Anjou (8)
79.	Ajax Daumeray Football (11)	2–3	AS Ruaudin (8)
80.	US Cantenay-Épinard (9)	0–3 (Note: Tie won by means of forfeit.)	US Arnage Pontlieue (8)
81.	JA Soulgé-sur-Ouette (8)	2–1	US Pays de Juhel (8)
82.	US Saint-Berthevin (8)	3–2	Croix Blanche Angers (8)
83.	ES Azé (10)	1–1 (7–8 p)	La Vigilante Mayet (9)
84.	AS Chemazé (10)	0–0 (2–1 p)	CF Châtelais-Nyoiseau-Bouillé-Grugé (11)
85.	FC Val du Loir (10)	1–2	EA Baugeois (8)
86.	Sainte Christine-Bourgneuf FC (11)	0–2	JGE Sucé-sur-Erdre (9)
87.	FC Stephanois (11)	3–2	FC Fief Gesté (10)
88.	FC Villedieu-La Renaudière (11)	4–3	Étoile du Cens Nantes (11)
89.	FC Fuilet-Chaussaire (9)	1–1 (3–4 p)	FC Retz (8)
90.	Loire Foot Alliance (10)	0–1	Jeunes d'Erbray (8)
91.	Les Touches FC (11)	1–5	AS Valanjou (10)
92.	FC Saint-Lambert Saint-Jean Saint-Léger Saint-Martin (10)	1–2	Le Cellier-Mauves FC (9)
93.	CAS Possosavennières (9)	1–2	US Thouaré (8)
94.	ES Belligné-Chapelle-Maumusson (11)	0–3	Pomjeannais JA (9)
95.	AS Casson (11)	0–4	AS Saint-Pierre d'Angrie (10)
96.	ES Val Baugeois (11)	1–3	AS Cérans-Foulletourte (10)
97.	US Saint-Ouen Saint-Biez (11)	0–6	CO Laigné-Saint-Gervais (10)
98.	Lombron Sports (10)	2–2 (4–3 p)	ASPTT Le Mans (9)
99.	US Coulans-La Quinte (11)	0–2	FC La Bazoge (9)
100.	ES Vertou (9)	3–3 (5–4 p)	Vigilante Saint Fulgent (8)
101.	ES Haute Goulaine (10)	0–2	FC Tiffauges Les Landes (11)
102.	FC Bouaye (8)	3–0	FO Cope Chauché (9)
103.	AS Saint-Gervais (11)	3–6	Legé FC (11)
104.	Hirondelles Soullandaises (11)	0–0 (4–2 p)	Étoile Mouzillon Foot (11)
105.	FC Sud Sèvre et Maine (10)	1–1 (3–1 p)	FC Falleron-Froidfond (10)
106.	Arche FC (9)	1–3 (Note: FC Île de Noirmoutier penalised for fielding suspended players, Arche FC qualify.)	FC Île de Noirmoutier (10)
107.	AFC Bouin-Bois-de-Céné-Châteauneuf (11)	1–1 (3–5 p)	Alliance Sud-Retz Machecoul (9)
108.	ES Vallet (10)	0–1	AS Boufféré (8)
109.	USM Beauvoir-sur-Mer (11)	1–7	FC Entente du Vignoble (10)
110.	AS Sud Loire (10)	1–1 (6–5 p) (Note: AS Sud Loire penalised for fielding a suspended player, FC Chavagnes-La Rabatelière qualify.)	FC Chavagnes-La Rabatelière (9)
111.	LSG Les Brouzils (8)	1–0 (Note: LSG Les Brouzils penalised for fielding a suspended player, Étoile de Clisson qualify.)	Étoile de Clisson (9)
112.	FC Gétigné-Boussay (10)	0–0 (3–4 p)	US Bequots-Lucquois (8)
113.	ES Yvré-l'Évêque (9)	5–2	US La Chapelle-Saint-Rémy (8)
114.	AC Aigné (11)	2–2 (3–4 p)	US Saint-Mars-la-Brière (9)
115.	AS Saint-Pavace (10)	0–2	La Patriote Bonnétable (8)
116.	Sainte-Jamme Sportive (11)	3–9	CS Cheminots du Mans (10)
117.	US Savigné-l'Évêque (10)	1–1 (4–3 p)	JS Parigné-l'Évêque (9)
118.	AS Sargéenne (10)	1–1 (6–7 p)	AS Fyé (11)
119.	Saint-Gilles-Saint-Hilaire FC (11)	2–0	ES Saint-Denis-la-Chevasse (9)
120.	Entente Sud Vendée (10)	1–1 (6–7 p)	Foot Espoir 85 (10)
121.	FC Meilleraie-Montournais-Menomblet (10)	1–2	Sud Vendée Football (9)
122.	US Aubigny (8)	3–2	Saint-Pierre Sportif Nieul-le-Dolent (10)
123.	US Gouledoisienne (10)	0–1	US Bernardière-Cugand (10)
124.	AS Saint-Maixent-sur-Vie (10)	1–2	FC Robretières La Roche-sur-Yon (9)
125.	Coëx Olympique (10)	1–2	Sainte-Foy FC (10)
126.	JA Nesmy (10)	4–2	Commequiers SF (10)
127.	Entente Givrand-L'Aiguillon-Landevieille FC (10)	0–0 (5–4 p)	Hermitage Venansault (10)
128.	Espoir du Marais Sallertaine (10)	1–2	Loups Sportifs Sainte-Flaive-des-Loups (10)
129.	US Mazé (11)	2–1	Est Anjou FC (10)
130.	ES Gennes-Les Rosiers (11)	3–2	ASR Vernantes-Vernoil (10)
131.	AS Vivy-Neuillé 90 (11)	15–0 (Note: Tie reversed from original draw.)	ES Jarzé (13)
132.	JS Layon (12)	1–1 (3–1 p)	FC Louet-Juignéen (11)
133.	FC Layon (10)	2–2 (4–2 p)	ÉS Trélazé (8)
134.	Anjou Baconne FC (11)	1–1 (5–6 p)	Doutre SC (11)
135.	ES Loire et Louet (11)	0–0 (3–1 p)	FC Mesnilaurentais (10)
136.	ES Layon (10)	1–4	US Beaufort-en-Vallée (8)
137.	AS Bayard-Saumur (9)	1–1 (4–3 p)	RC Doué-la-Fontaine (8)
138.	FC Landivy-Pontmain (10)	7–0	Brecé Sports (11)
139.	US Parigné-sur-Braye (10)	0–1	CS Saint-Pierre-des-Landes (10)
140.	Laval Outremer (11)	1–3	Larchamp-Montaudin FC (10)
141.	USB Juvigné (10)	1–4	ASO Montenay (9)
142.	US Saint-Jean-sur-Mayenne (10)	0–3	FC Lassay (8)
143.	Placé FC (10)	1–1 (3–5 p)	FC Ruillé-Loiron (10)
144.	US Désertines (11)	0–2	EB Commer (10)
145.	AJS Frambaldéenne (10)	0–3	FA Laval (10)
146.	US Fougerolles-du-Plessis (10)	0–5	Nuillé Sports (10)
147.	AS Neau (11)	1–4	Gorron FC (9)
148.	AS Le Bourgneuf-la-Forêt (9)	1–0	US Villiers-Charlemagne (10)
149.	Voltigeurs Saint-Georges-Buttavent (10)	2–1	FC Sud Ouest Mayennais (10)
150.	AS Ballée (10)	1–2	US Glonnières (9)
151.	AS Parné (10)	2–4	Ambrières Cigné Football (8)
152.	CA Voutré (10)	2–2 (1–3 p)	ES Quelainaise (10)
153.	FC de l'Aisne (9)	2–4	Alerte Ahuillé FC (9)
154.	US La Bazoge-Montpinçon-Belgeard (9)	3–0	FC Montjean (11)
155.	US Chantrigné (9)	1–1(3–2 p)	US Argentré (10)
156.	US Herminoise (10)	1–3	Saint-Michel SF (10)
157.	Amicale Beignon-Basset (11)	0–2	ES Grosbreuil-Girouard (9)
158.	RS Les Clouzeaux (11)	0–1	FC Achards (8)
159.	AS Dom-Tom (11)	0–2	Entente Cheffois-Antigny-Saint-Maurice (9)
160.	SO Fougeré-Thorigny (11)	1–6	FC Cantonal Sud Vendée (9)
161.	US Landeronde-Saint-Georges (11)	1–0	La Chaize FEC (9)
162.	AF Apremont-La Chapelle (11)	1–1 (5–4 p)	US La Ferrière Dompierre (9)
163.	USSA Montréverd (11)	2–5	ES Rives de l'Yon (9)
164.	FC Vallée du Graon (11)	0–5	FC Jard-Avrillé (8)
165.	FC Talmondais (10)	5–1	FC Généraudière Roche Sud (8)
166.	US Alverne (12)	1–3	UFC Erdre et Donneau (10)
167.	AS Sion-Lusanger (12)	0–3	Héric FC (10)
168.	FC Fay Bouvron (9)	2–2 (1–3 p)	FC Mouzeil-Teillé-Ligné (8)
169.	FC Estuaire (12)	1–3	CS Montoirin (9)
170.	Herbadilla Foot (10)	1–6	Nantes La Mellinet (8)
171.	Saint-Joseph de Porterie Nantes (10)	1–1 (1–3 p)	FC Grand Lieu (8)
172.	ÉS Jovéenne (11)	1–5	Don Bosco Football Nantes (9)
173.	FC Vallons le Pin (9)	2–4	ES Dresny-Plessé (8)
174.	Union Méan Penhoët Saint-Nazaire (11)	0–7	Couëron Chabossière FC (9)
175.	Océane FC (10)	0–1	Saint-Aubin-Guérande Football (8)
176.	Les Côteaux de la Roche (12)	0–3	JA Saint-Mars-du-Désert (9)
177.	US Villepot (12)	0–4	FC Oudon-Couffé (10)
178.	CA Vouvantais/US Glainoise (12)	0–1	Nantes Sud 98 (10)
179.	Espérance Saint-Yves Nantes (10)	1–1 (3–2 p)	FC Atlantique Morbihan (11)
180.	Métallo Sport Chantenaysien (10)	0–1	AS Grandchamp Foot (11)
181.	Saint Pierre de Retz (8)	3–0	Nantes Saint-Pierre (9)
182.	Saint-Herblain OC (9)	3–3 (6–5 p)	AEPR Rezé (8)
183.	FC Guémené-Massérac (9)	9–1	Étoile du Don Moisdon-Meilleraye (10)
184.	Petit-Mars FC (10)	4–1	Saint-Vincent LUSTVI (10)
185.	AS Ruffigné (12)	0–8	FC Le Gavre Le Chevallerais (10)
186.	AS Mésanger (10)	1–2	Nozay OS (9)
187.	FC Côte Sauvage (11)	0–3	ES Maritime (10)
188.	Amicale Saint-Lyphard (10)	1–2	La Saint-André (8)
189.	FC Presqu'île Vilaine (11)	3–1	FC Brière (10)
190.	Lavau FC (11)	0–2	ES Pornichet (8)
191.	Goelands Sammaritains (12)	3–1	FC Immaculée (9)
192.	ES Notre-Dame-des-Landes (11)	1–6	Sympho Foot Treillières (9)
193.	US Aubinoise (11)	1–1 (4–5 p)	Abbaretz-Saffré FC (9)
194.	Eclair de Chauvé (11)	1–7	UF Saint-Herblain (8)
195.	Sainte-Reine-Crossac Football (10)	0–4	AOS Pontchâteau (8)
196.	Saint-Marc Football (8)	6–0	Union Brivet Campbon Chapelle-Launay (9)
197.	Savenay-Malville-Prinquiau FC (9)	2–0	Bouguenais Football (10)
198.	Alerte de Méan (11)	3–4	AS La Madeleine (9)
199.	US Soudan (11)	2–2 (2–4 p)	Hermine Saint-Ouennaise (8)
200.	FC Logne et Boulogne (11)	1–3	FC Bourgneuf-en-Retz (11)
201.	La Guinéenne de l'Association de Loire Atlantique (12)	3–2	US Bugallière Orvault (11)
202.	US Saint-Molf (11)	8–1	US Vital Frossay (10)
203.	Saint-Médard Football (11)	3–0	FC Basse Loire (10)
204.	AS Guillaumois (11)	0–2	Saint-Cyr Foot Herbignac (10)
205.	RAC Cheminots Nantes (11)	0–2	Réveil Saint-Géréon (10)
206.	FC Vay Marsac (10)	1–1 (3–1 p)	FC Trois Rivières (10)
207.	ES des Marais (9)	1–0	FC La Montagne (10)
208.	Orvault RC (10)	5–2	ES du Lac (10)
209.	AS Andouillé (8)	1–3	AL Châteaubriant (9)

=== Second round ===
These matches were played on 2 and 3 September 2023.

Second Round Results: Pays de la Loire
Tie no	Home team (Tier)	Score	Away team (Tier)
1.	Alliance Sud-Retz Machecoul (9)	2–5	FC Retz (8)
2.	US Alpes Mancelles (10)	1–4	CA Évronnais (7)
3.	Olympique Bécon-Villemoisan-Saint-Augustin (9)	0–3	JS Allonnes (8)
4.	ES Morannes (10)	1–5	EG Rouillon (8)
5.	FC Rouez-Crissé (11)	1–1 (2–4 p)	FC Pays de Sillé (10)
6.	AS Val-d'Erdre-Auxence (10)	0–6	Auvers Poillé Brulon FC (8)
7.	AS Saint-Pierre d'Angrie (10)	3–1	AS Clermont-Créans (8)
8.	AS Fyé (11)	1–1 (5–4 p)	US La Bazoge-Montpinçon-Belgeard (9)
9.	CO Laigné-Saint-Gervais (10)	1–1 (6–5 p)	CO Castélorien (8)
10.	CS Cheminots du Mans (10)	3–2	US Saint-Berthevin (8)
11.	AC Longué (11)	1–0	ES Moncé (8)
12.	EA Baugeois (8)	1–0	US Guécélard (9)
13.	AS Cérans-Foulletourte (10)	1–1 (6–7 p)	ES Andard-Brain (9)
14.	US Challes-Grand Lucé (10)	0–7	AS Le Mans Villaret (7)
15.	AS Neuville-sur-Sarthe (10)	2–4	CA Loué (9)
16.	JS Solesmienne (10)	1–5	FC Saint-Saturnin-La Milesse (7)
17.	US Savigné-l'Évêque (10)	1–1 (6–5 p)	Beaumont SA (8)
18.	SA Mamertins (8)	3–1	ES Yvré-l'Évêque (9)
19.	Lombron Sports (10)	2–3	FC La Bazoge (9)
20.	AS Bayard-Saumur (9)	2–0	La Flèche RC (7)
21.	US Arnage Pontlieue (8)	5–2	ASL L'Huisserie Foot (9)
22.	AS Juigné-sur-Sarthe (9)	1–3	AS La Chapelle-Saint-Aubin (8)
23.	US Glonnières (9)	0–3	VS Fertois (8)
24.	JS Layon (12)	0–1	Val de Sèvre Football (10)
25.	FC Villedieu-La Renaudière (11)	1–7	FF Mortagne-sur-Sèvre (10)
26.	Saint-Georges Trémentines FC (9)	4–1	AS Bruffière Defontaine (10)
27.	US Le Genest (10)	0–7	CS Lion d'Angers (8)
28.	SomloirYzernay CPF (9)	1–2	US Les Epesses-Saint-Mars (10)
29.	ES Montilliers (8)	1–0	Élan de Gorges Foot (7)
30.	La Vigilante Mayet (9)	1–5	AS Tiercé-Cheffes (7)
31.	US Saint-Mars-la-Brière (9)	1–1 (4–5 p)	CS Changé (8)
32.	US Mansigné (9)	2–4	ASI Mûrs-Erigné (7)
33.	US Thouaré (8)	0–1	EA La Tessoualle (7)
34.	Le Cellier-Mauves FC (9)	1–1 (5–3 p)	Saint-André-Saint-Macaire FC (7)
35.	FC Oudon-Couffé (10)	1–3	FC Bout' Loire-et-Evre (10)
36.	Nozay OS (9)	2–1	FC Craonnais (8)
37.	ES Pornichet (8)	3–3 (4–5 p)	Savenay-Malville-Prinquiau FC (9)
38.	La Guinéenne de l'Association de Loire Atlantique (12)	1–0	Orvault RC (10)
39.	UF Saint-Herblain (8)	1–2	AC Saint-Brevin (7)
40.	AL Châteaubriant (9)	5–2	FC Vay Marsac (10)
41.	FC Grand Lieu (8)	1–1 (3–4 p)	Montaigu Vendée Football (7)
42.	Legé FC (11)	0–3	FC Garnachois (10)
43.	US Saint-Michel Triaize La Tranche Angles (9)	0–6	La France d'Aizenay (7)
44.	FC Saint-Philbert-Réorthe-Jaudonnière (11)	2–1	Sud Vendée Football (9)
45.	AS Quatre Vents Fontaines (10)	4–1	AS Sigournais-Saint Germain (11)
46.	ES Rives de l'Yon (9)	2–1	JA Nesmy (10)
47.	AS Ruaudin (8)	1–2	US Chantrigné (9)
48.	US Bouloire (9)	2–7	La Patriote Bonnétable (8)
49.	Doutre SC (11)	0–6	AS Seiches-sur-le-Loire-Marcé (7)
50.	US Vibraysienne (8)	0–3	Écommoy FC (8)
51.	Pays de Chantonnay Foot (8)	2–4	RC Cholet (7)
52.	RS Ardelay (9)	0–1	Olympique Chemillé-Melay (7)
53.	FC Saint-Laurent Malvent (9)	0–1	FC Beaupréau La Chapelle (8)
54.	FC Mouchamps-Rochetrejoux (8)	0–2	AS Saint-Pierre-Montrevault (7)
55.	Sèvremont FC (8)	3–1	AS Le-Puy-Saint-Bonnet (9)
56.	Entente Cheffois-Antigny-Saint-Maurice (9)	1–1 (2–4 p)	FC Talmondais (10)
57.	Foot Espoir 85 (10)	3–1	FC Jard-Avrillé (8)
58.	Sainte-Foy FC (10)	0–1	Saint-Gilles-Saint-Hilaire FC (11)
59.	US Bernardière-Cugand (10)	0–0 (4–5 p)	AS Vieillevigne-La Planche (7)
60.	AS Boufféré (8)	0–0 (3–4 p)	Saint Pierre de Retz (8)
61.	FC Tiffauges Les Landes (11)	0–2	FC Sud Sèvre et Maine (10)
62.	Étoile de Vie Le Fenouiller (9)	1–4	Pornic Foot (7)
63.	ES Loire et Louet (11)	5–3	US Mazé (11)
64.	AS Vivy-Neuillé 90 (11)	0–0 (0–3 p)	US Beaufort-en-Vallée (8)
65.	Christophe-Séguinière (8)	3–0	US Varades (7)
66.	Montreuil-Juigné Béné Football (8)	0–2	US Lucéene (8)
67.	Saint-Pierre Mazières (8)	1–4	RC Ancenis 44 (7)
68.	Pomjeannais JA (9)	1–3	FC Essartais (8)
69.	Saint-Melaine OS (9)	0–1	FC Château-Gontier (8)
70.	AS Ponts-de-Cé (11)	2–2 (6–7 p)	US Nautique Spay (7)
71.	FC Longuenée-en-Anjou (9)	0–7	ES Aubance (7)
72.	ES Gennes-Les Rosiers (11)	1–0	FC Layon (10)
73.	AS Valanjou (10)	1–2	AS Saint-Hilaire-Vihiers-Saint-Paul (8)
74.	SC Angevin (10)	8–0	UF Allonnes-Brain-sur-Allonnes (9)
75.	Olympique Liré-Drain (8)	4–3	ES Bouchemaine (7)
76.	Réveil Saint-Géréon (10)	1–6	Andrezé-Jub-Jallais FC (9)
77.	AS Saint-Sylvain-d'Anjou (8)	1–1 (3–0 p)	JA Soulgé-sur-Ouette (8)
78.	AS Avrillé (10)	0–3	AS Bourny Laval (8)
79.	AS Longeron-Torfou (9)	1–3	Football Chalonnes-Chaudefonds (7)
80.	Maybéléger FC (10)	4–0	Saint-Barthélémy-d'Anjou Foot (10)
81.	Larchamp-Montaudin FC (10)	1–4	FC Lassay (8)
82.	FC Landivy-Pontmain (10)	1–4	Ambrières Cigné Football (8)
83.	EB Commer (10)	3–7	CS Saint-Pierre-des-Landes (10)
84.	FA Laval (10)	3–1	Alerte Ahuillé FC (9)
85.	FC Ruillé-Loiron (10)	0–6	US Saint-Pierre Port-Brillet (9)
86.	ASO Montenay (9)	2–0	Nuillé Sports (10)
87.	Gorron FC (9)	4–4 (4–5 p)	US Méral-Cossé (8)
88.	AS Martigné-sur-Mayenne (8)	1–1 (2–4 p)	Ernéenne Foot (7)
89.	US Laval (8)	3–2	FE Trélazé (8)
90.	USC Pays de Montsurs (8)	0–1	Gazélec Le Mans (9)
91.	AS Contest-Saint Baudelle (8)	1–2	AS Mulsanne-Teloché (7)
92.	Loups Sportifs Sainte-Flaive-des-Loups (10)	0–2	AF Apremont-La Chapelle (11)
93.	Hirondelles Soullandaises (11)	0–5	Luçon FC (8)
94.	FC Cantonal Sud Vendée (9)	0–4	Mouilleron SF (7)
95.	ES Grosbreuil-Girouard (9)	1–3	ES Marsouins Brétignolles-Brem (8)
96.	ES Belleville-sur-Vie (9)	0–2	FC Plaine et Bocage (8)
97.	FC Achards (8)	4–1	US Bequots-Lucquois (8)
98.	US Bournezeau-Saint-Hilaire (9)	2–3	US Aubigny (8)
99.	FC Saligny (9)	0–2	FC La Génétouze (8)
100.	US Landeronde-Saint-Georges (11)	1–1 (4–3 p)	FC Robretières La Roche-sur-Yon (9)
101.	Écureils des Pays de Monts (9)	1–0	Entente Givrand-L'Aiguillon-Landevieille FC (10)
102.	JA Saint-Mars-du-Désert (9)	0–3	ES Segré (7)
103.	JS Laval Maghreb (9)	5–4	FC Pouëze-Saint-Clément-Brain (10)
104.	AS Chemazé (10)	0–1	Voltigeurs Saint-Georges-Buttavent (10)
105.	ES Quelainaise (10)	5–4	Hermine Saint-Ouennaise (8)
106.	Nantes La Mellinet (8)	3–5	NDC Angers (7)
107.	Saint-Médard Football (11)	3–5	Saint-Herblain OC (9)
108.	ES Vertou (9)	0–2	Elan Sorinières Football (7)
109.	FC Bourgneuf-en-Retz (11)	0–12	AC Chapelain Foot (7)
110.	Couëron Chabossière FC (9)	1–0	Landreau-Loroux OSC (8)
111.	Héric FC (10)	5–0	Petit-Mars FC (10)
112.	UFC Erdre et Donneau (10)	1–4	FC Guémené-Massérac (9)
113.	Saint-Cyr Foot Herbignac (10)	0–3	La Saint-André (8)
114.	ES Maritime (10)	0–8	Saint-Aubin-Guérande Football (8)
115.	Abbaretz-Saffré FC (9)	2–2 (6–5 p)	FC La Chapelle-des-Marais (7)
116.	FC Presqu'île Vilaine (11)	0–7	AS La Madeleine (9)
117.	AS Grandchamp Foot (11)	1–4	Saint-Marc Football (8)
118.	ES Dresny-Plessé (8)	1–1 (4–5 p)	SC Nord Atlantique (7)
119.	FC Stephanois (11)	1–5	JGE Sucé-sur-Erdre (9)
120.	FC Mouzeil-Teillé-Ligné (8)	0–3	ES Vigneux (7)
121.	US Saint-Molf (11)	0–1	ES des Marais (9)
122.	FC Le Gavre Le Chevallerais (10)	0–2	AS Le Bourgneuf-la-Forêt (9)
123.	CS Montoirin (9)	1–6	FC Rezé (7)
124.	Don Bosco Football Nantes (9)	3–4	FC Bouaye (8)
125.	AOS Pontchâteau (8)	2–2 (4–3 p)	ASC Saint-Médard-de-Doulon Nantes (7)
126.	Jeunes d'Erbray (8)	3–5	ES Blain (7)
127.	Sympho Foot Treillières (9)	0–0 (2–3 p)	Nort ACF (7)
128.	FC Entente du Vignoble (10)	3–4	Espérance Saint-Yves Nantes (10)
129.	Nantes Sud 98 (10)	4–0	Étoile de Clisson (9)
130.	Goelands Sammaritains (12)	0–3	Arche FC (9)
131.	Saint-Michel SF (10)	1–1 (4–5 p)	FC Chavagnes-La Rabatelière (9)
132.	US Entrammes (8)	5–1	ASPTT Laval (9)

=== Third round ===
These matches were played on 16, 17 September 2023, with one replayed on 24 September 2023.

Third Round Results: Pays de la Loire
Tie no	Home team (Tier)	Score	Away team (Tier)
1.	Val de Sèvre Football (10)	2–5	Saint-Aubin-Guérande Football (8)
2.	FC Beaupréau La Chapelle (8)	2–0 (Note: The original match finished 0–3, but was ordered to be replayed after a refereeing error regarding substitutions was reported.)	FC Achards (8)
3.	ES des Marais (9)	0–2	FC Challans (5)
4.	AS Le Mans Villaret (7)	2–0	Saint Pierre de Retz (8)
5.	CA Loué (9)	6–0	FA Laval (10)
6.	US Aubigny (8)	2–2 (2–4 p)	Ambrières Cigné Football (8)
7.	SC Nord Atlantique (7)	1–1 (4–5 p)	US Arnage Pontlieue (8)
8.	AS Fyé (11)	0–10	Saint-Nazaire AF (5)
9.	FC Bout' Loire-et-Evre (10)	0–2	FC Saint-Julien Divatte (6)
10.	Abbaretz-Saffré FC (9)	1–1 (5–4 p)	CA Évronnais (7)
11.	La Patriote Bonnétable (8)	1–3	Stade Mayennais FC (6)
12.	Mouilleron SF (7)	2–0	ES Segré (7)
13.	AS Saint-Pierre-Montrevault (7)	2–1	USJA Carquefou (6)
14.	AS Le Bourgneuf-la-Forêt (9)	2–2 (5–4 p)	ES Vigneux (7)
15.	FC Pays de Sillé (10)	2–1	Écureils des Pays de Monts (9)
16.	FC Garnachois (10)	0–1	US Beaufort-en-Vallée (8)
17.	AL Châteaubriant (9)	2–5	US Changé (6)
18.	AS Saint-Pierre d'Angrie (10)	0–3	Sablé FC (5)
19.	JS Allonnes (8)	0–3	AS La Châtaigneraie (5)
20.	FC La Génétouze (8)	2–4	Olympique Liré-Drain (8)
21.	Auvers Poillé Brulon FC (8)	5–0	FC Chavagnes-La Rabatelière (9)
22.	FC Lassay (8)	2–1	Saint-Herblain OC (9)
23.	ASO Montenay (9)	0–2	US La Baule-Le Pouliguen (6)
24.	Gazélec Le Mans (9)	5–1	ES Montilliers (8)
25.	US Les Epesses-Saint-Mars (10)	1–1 (5–4 p)	La Saint-André (8)
26.	Football Chalonnes-Chaudefonds (7)	3–2	FC Saint-Saturnin-La Milesse (7)
27.	ASI Mûrs-Erigné (7)	0–0 (1–4 p)	Montaigu Vendée Football (7)
28.	ES Gennes-Les Rosiers (11)	0–2	TVEC Les Sables-d'Olonne (6)
29.	Saint-Gilles-Saint-Hilaire FC (11)	1–1 (11–10 p)	Christophe-Séguinière (8)
30.	Andrezé-Jub-Jallais FC (9)	3–1	AC Saint-Brevin (7)
31.	AS Vieillevigne-La Planche (7)	0–0 (6–5 p)	AC Basse-Goulaine (6)
32.	Espérance Saint-Yves Nantes (10)	4–3	CS Saint-Pierre-des-Landes (10)
33.	ES Quelainaise (10)	0–6	Vendée Fontenay Foot (5)
34.	FC Essartais (8)	2–0	AS Bayard-Saumur (9)
35.	Écommoy FC (8)	3–3 (4–5 p)	ES Rives de l'Yon (9)
36.	Foot Espoir 85 (10)	0–4	AS Saint-Sylvain-d'Anjou (8)
37.	JGE Sucé-sur-Erdre (9)	0–2	JSC Bellevue Nantes (6)
38.	Pornic Foot (7)	1–4	US Philbertine Football (5)
39.	FC Guémené-Massérac (9)	4–2	CO Laigné-Saint-Gervais (10)
40.	FC Sud Sèvre et Maine (10)	1–0	FC Bouaye (8)
41.	CS Changé (8)	4–1	AOS Pontchâteau (8)
42.	US Chantrigné (9)	1–7	JS Coulaines (6)
43.	EA La Tessoualle (7)	2–1	Nort ACF (7)
44.	AC Longué (11)	0–1	AS Seiches-sur-le-Loire-Marcé (7)
45.	FC La Bazoge (9)	0–6	Mareuil SC (6)
46.	ES Blain (7)	7–1	US Laval (8)
47.	AF Apremont-La Chapelle (11)	0–2	FC Château-Gontier (8)
48.	ES Marsouins Brétignolles-Brem (8)	2–1	SC Beaucouzé (6)
49.	AS Saint-Hilaire-Vihiers-Saint-Paul (8)	1–3	RC Ancenis 44 (7)
50.	Orvault SF (6)	2–1	La Suze Roëzé FC (6)
51.	US Landeronde-Saint-Georges (11)	1–1 (4–2 p)	Elan Sorinières Football (7)
52.	Savenay-Malville-Prinquiau FC (9)	2–1	AS Tiercé-Cheffes (7)
53.	Voltigeurs Saint-Georges-Buttavent (10)	2–4	Maybéléger FC (10)
54.	AS La Chapelle-Saint-Aubin (8)	1–0	US Entrammes (8)
55.	FF Mortagne-sur-Sèvre (10)	0–0 (3–5 p)	Luçon FC (8)
56.	Nantes Sud 98 (10)	2–4	Ancienne Château-Gontier (5)
57.	US Lucéene (8)	2–0	RC Cholet (7)
58.	AS La Madeleine (9)	9–1	US Savigné-l'Évêque (10)
59.	VS Fertois (8)	0–2	Vendée Poiré-sur-Vie Football (5)
60.	Saint-Georges Trémentines FC (9)	0–0 (3–4 p)	La France d'Aizenay (7)
61.	Le Cellier-Mauves FC (9)	0–6	Pouzauges Bocage FC (6)
62.	AS Bourny Laval (8)	3–1	AS Mulsanne-Teloché (7)
63.	ES Loire et Louet (11)	0–2	US Saint-Pierre Port-Brillet (9)
64.	CS Lion d'Angers (8)	1–6	AS Sautron (6)
65.	US Méral-Cossé (8)	3–0	US Nautique Spay (7)
66.	FC Talmondais (10)	1–2	ES Bonchamp (6)
67.	SC Angevin (10)	1–1 (4–2 p)	USSA Vertou (5)
68.	Sèvremont FC (8)	1–4	ESOF La Roche-sur-Yon (6)
69.	Saint-Marc Football (8)	5–1	Couëron Chabossière FC (9)
70.	Nozay OS (9)	0–2	Olympique Chemillé-Melay (7)
71.	ES Aubance (7)	1–1 (4–3 p)	FC Olonne Château (5)
72.	FC Retz (8)	2–0	SA Mamertins (8)
73.	Ernéenne Foot (7)	2–0	NDC Angers (7)
74.	ES Andard-Brain (9)	0–0 (4–3 p)	Héric FC (10)
75.	La Guinéenne de l'Association de Loire Atlantique (12)	1–1 (5–4 p)	AS Quatre Vents Fontaines (10)
76.	CS Cheminots du Mans (10)	0–4	FC Plaine et Bocage (8)
77.	AC Chapelain Foot (7)	1–1 (5–4 p)	Saint-Sébastien FC (6)
78.	FC Saint-Philbert-Réorthe-Jaudonnière (11)	1–4	EA Baugeois (8)
79.	EG Rouillon (8)	5–2	JS Laval Maghreb (9)
80.	Arche FC (9)	2–4	FC Rezé (7)

=== Fourth round ===
These matches were played on 30 September and 1 October 2023.

Fourth Round Results: Pays de la Loire
Tie no	Home team (Tier)	Score	Away team (Tier)
1.	US Changé (6)	1–2	Olympique Saumur FC (4)
2.	US Les Epesses-Saint-Mars (10)	2–2 (2–4 p)	FC Rezé (7)
3.	Saint-Marc Football (8)	2–2 (5–3 p)	AS Vieillevigne-La Planche (7)
4.	US Lucéene (8)	4–1	FC Lassay (8)
5.	CA Loué (9)	0–2	Orvault SF (6)
6.	US Saint-Pierre Port-Brillet (9)	1–3	Saint-Nazaire AF (5)
7.	JSC Bellevue Nantes (6)	2–0	EA La Tessoualle (7)
8.	FC Sud Sèvre et Maine (10)	1–3	Sablé FC (5)
9.	FC Essartais (8)	2–1	Football Chalonnes-Chaudefonds (7)
10.	AS Le Bourgneuf-la-Forêt (9)	0–6	Mareuil SC (6)
11.	US Landeronde-Saint-Georges (11)	2–2 (6–5 p)	EG Rouillon (8)
12.	AS Sautron (6)	1–0	RC Ancenis 44 (7)
13.	La France d'Aizenay (7)	3–1	AS Seiches-sur-le-Loire-Marcé (7)
14.	Ambrières Cigné Football (8)	1–1 (4–2 p)	FC Guémené-Massérac (9)
15.	FC Saint-Julien Divatte (6)	0–1	La Roche VF (4)
16.	Espérance Saint-Yves Nantes (10)	2–9	CS Changé (8)
17.	EA Baugeois (8)	0–1	ES Marsouins Brétignolles-Brem (8)
18.	AS Saint-Sylvain-d'Anjou (8)	0–3	Vendée Poiré-sur-Vie Football (5)
19.	Montaigu Vendée Football (7)	0–3	Ancienne Château-Gontier (5)
20.	Abbaretz-Saffré FC (9)	1–4	Stade Mayennais FC (6)
21.	Saint-Gilles-Saint-Hilaire FC (11)	3–2	ES Andard-Brain (9)
22.	SC Angevin (10)	2–3	US Méral-Cossé (8)
23.	Mouilleron SF (7)	0–4	Voltigeurs de Châteaubriant (4)
24.	US Arnage Pontlieue (8)	1–5	TVEC Les Sables-d'Olonne (6)
25.	AS La Chapelle-Saint-Aubin (8)	0–4	FC Challans (5)
26.	Maybéléger FC (10)	0–0 (8–7 p)	Gazélec Le Mans (9)
27.	Savenay-Malville-Prinquiau FC (9)	1–2	Olympique Chemillé-Melay (7)
28.	FC Plaine et Bocage (8)	1–1 (4–2 p)	Ernéenne Foot (7)
29.	FC Beaupréau La Chapelle (8)	1–4	US Philbertine Football (5)
30.	Olympique Liré-Drain (8)	1–1 (4–2 p)	Andrezé-Jub-Jallais FC (9)
31.	FC Château-Gontier (8)	2–2 (5–4 p)	ES Blain (7)
32.	Pouzauges Bocage FC (6)	3–2	ESOF La Roche-sur-Yon (6)
33.	Luçon FC (8)	2–1	FC Retz (8)
34.	Saint-Aubin-Guérande Football (8)	3–2	ES Bonchamp (6)
35.	AS La Châtaigneraie (5)	0–1	JS Coulaines (6)
36.	AS La Madeleine (9)	4–1	Auvers Poillé Brulon FC (8)
37.	AS Saint-Pierre-Montrevault (7)	1–0	AS Bourny Laval (8)
38.	AS Le Mans Villaret (7)	0–3	Les Herbiers VF (4)
39.	US La Baule-Le Pouliguen (6)	0–0 (2–3 p)	ES Aubance (7)
40.	La Guinéenne de l'Association de Loire Atlantique (12)	0–5	Vendée Fontenay Foot (5)
41.	ES Rives de l'Yon (9)	0–3	AC Chapelain Foot (7)
42.	FC Pays de Sillé (10)	0–3	US Beaufort-en-Vallée (8)

=== Fifth round ===
These matches were played on 14 and 15 October 2023.

Fifth Round Results: Pays de la Loire
Tie no	Home team (Tier)	Score	Away team (Tier)
1.	Olympique Saumur FC (4)	2–1	Saint-Nazaire AF (5)
2.	US Lucéene (8)	0–3	Voltigeurs de Châteaubriant (4)
3.	AS La Madeleine (9)	1–1 (2–4 p)	Olympique Chemillé-Melay (7)
4.	Luçon FC (8)	1–2	Mareuil SC (6)
5.	Saint-Gilles-Saint-Hilaire FC (11)	1–1 (2–4 p)	FC Château-Gontier (8)
6.	FC Plaine et Bocage (8)	0–2	Vendée Poiré-sur-Vie Football (5)
7.	Vendée Fontenay Foot (5)	3–0	Pouzauges Bocage FC (6)
8.	Saint-Marc Football (8)	2–4	JSC Bellevue Nantes (6)
9.	Ambrières Cigné Football (8)	0–14	Le Mans FC (3)
10.	FC Rezé (7)	0–2	Orvault SF (6)
11.	AS Saint-Pierre-Montrevault (7)	0–2	US Philbertine Football (5)
12.	AC Chapelain Foot (7)	2–2 (5–6 p)	SO Cholet (3)
13.	US Méral-Cossé (8)	2–0	FC Essartais (8)
14.	Olympique Liré-Drain (8)	2–2 (1–4 p)	Ancienne Château-Gontier (5)
15.	US Landeronde-Saint-Georges (11)	0–2	CS Changé (8)
16.	Maybéléger FC (10)	0–1	Saint-Aubin-Guérande Football (8)
17.	US Beaufort-en-Vallée (8)	1–3	JS Coulaines (6)
18.	Stade Mayennais FC (6)	1–0	TVEC Les Sables-d'Olonne (6)
19.	La France d'Aizenay (7)	1–0	AS Sautron (6)
20.	ES Aubance (7)	1–1 (5–4 p)	Sablé FC (5)
21.	ES Marsouins Brétignolles-Brem (8)	0–2	Les Herbiers VF (4)
22.	FC Challans (5)	0–0 (4–3 p)	ESOF La Roche-sur-Yon (6)

=== Sixth round ===
These matches were played on 28 and 29 October 2023.

Sixth Round Results: Pays de la Loire
Tie no	Home team (Tier)	Score	Away team (Tier)
1.	FC Château-Gontier (8)	0–2	JS Coulaines (6)
2.	ES Aubance (7)	2–2 (4–2 p)	Voltigeurs de Châteaubriant (4)
3.	JSC Bellevue Nantes (6)	0–2	FC Challans (5)
4.	CS Changé (8)	1–1 (4–5 p)	Saint-Aubin-Guérande Football (8)
5.	Ancienne Château-Gontier (5)	0–5	Olympique Saumur FC (4)
6.	SO Cholet (3)	2–1	Le Mans FC (3)
7.	Olympique Chemillé-Melay (7)	2–2 (2–4 p)	Stade Mayennais FC (6)
8.	Mareuil SC (6)	0–3	Les Herbiers VF (4)
9.	US Méral-Cossé (8)	0–4	US Philbertine Football (5)
10.	Orvault SF (6)	1–1 (4–5 p)	La France d'Aizenay (7)
11.	Vendée Poiré-sur-Vie Football (5)	0–0 (4–2 p)	Vendée Fontenay Foot (5)
