= 2025–26 Coupe de France preliminary rounds, Pays de la Loire =

The 2025–26 Coupe de France preliminary rounds, Pays de la Loire was the qualifying competition to decide which teams from the leagues of the Pays de la Loire region of France took part in the main competition from the seventh round.

A total of eleven teams qualified from the Pays de la Loire preliminary rounds.

In 2024–25, Le Mans FC were the team from the region to progress furthest in the main competition, reaching the round of 16 before being beaten 2–0 by eventual champions Paris Saint-Germain FC.

== Draws and Fixtures ==
On 23 July 2025, the league published that 519 teams from the region had entered the competition, including the four teams qualifying directly for the main competition. At the same time, they confirmed the first round would consist of 200 ties, including 46 teams from Régionale 3 and all teams from the district level leagues. The first round draw was published by the league on 28 July 2025. The second round draw, which saw the entry of the remaining teams from Régional 3 and those from Régional 2, was published on 28 August 2025. The third round draw, featuring the entry into the competition of the 18 Régional 1 teams and the 7 Championnat National 3 teams, was published on 4 September 2025. The fourth round draw, which saw the 4 teams from the region that play in Championnat National 2 join the competition, was published on 17 September 2025. The fifth round draw was published on 2 October 2025. The sixth round draw was published on 15 October 2025.

=== First round ===
These matches were played on 24 August 2025.

First Round Results: Pays de la Loire
Tie no	Home team (Tier)	Score	Away team (Tier)
1.	US La Bigottière-Alexain	0–2	Moulay Sports (10)
2.	ES Pineaux (12)	0–8	Hermitage Venansault (10)
3.	FC Cantonal Sud Vendée (9)	0–0 (4–2 p) (Note: FC Cantonal Sud Vendée penalised for fielding a suspended player, US Bournezeau-Saint-Hilaire qualified.)	US Bournezeau-Saint-Hilaire (8)
4.	ES Vallet (10)	0–3	FC Chavagnes-La Rabatelière (8)
5.	FC Entente du Vignoble (9)	2–1 (Note: ES Saint-Denis-la-Chevasse further penalised for fielding a suspended player.)	ES Saint-Denis-la-Chevasse (8)
6.	Étoile de Clisson (10)	1–5	FO Cope Chauché (8)
7.	ES Vertou (9)	2–2 (5–4 p)	US Bequots-Lucquois (9)
8.	FC Sud Sèvre et Maine (10)	2–1	LSG Les Brouzils (8)
9.	AL Châteaubriant (9)	1–0	Athletic Laigné-Loigné (8)
10.	AS Boufféré (9)	0–0 (5–4 p)	AS Maine (9)
11.	US Bernardière-Cugand (9)	5–1	FC Côteaux du Vignoble (8)
12.	FC Gétigné-Boussay (10)	2–3	Saint-Michel SF (9)
13.	FC Vay Marsac (10)	0–6	FC Craonnais (8)
14.	CA Voutré (10)	0–3	EG Rouillon (8)
15.	FC Pays de Sillé (10)	0–3	US Forcé (9)
16.	AS Juigné-sur-Sarthe (10)	1–0	AS Ballée (10)
17.	AJS Frambaldéenne (10)	1–5	AS Saint-Jean-d'Assé (9)
18.	US Villiers-Charlemagne (10)	2–0	US Arnage Pontlieue (8)
19.	SC Trangé-Chaufour-Degré (10)	5–1 (Note: Tie won by means of forfeit.)	US Le Genest (10)
20.	ASPTT Le Mans (9)	2–1	ASPTT Laval (8)
21.	ES Azé (9)	0–3	SS Noyen-sur-Sarthe (9)
22.	FC La Bazoge (9)	0–0 (5–3 p)	AS Vaiges (8)
23.	FC Île de Noirmoutier (10)	1–6	FC Retz (9)
24.	AFC Bouin-Bois-de-Céné-Châteauneuf (11)	0–8	AEPR Rezé (9)
25.	USM Beauvoir-sur-Mer (11)	1–3	ES des Marais (9)
26.	Écureils des Pays de Monts (10)	3–3 (4–5 p)	ES Rives de l'Yon (9)
27.	Alliance Sud-Retz Machecoul (9)	4–2	FC Garnachois (10)
28.	Laval Outremer (12)	0–3	US Tennie-Saint-Symphorien (10)
29.	FC Moulins-le-Carbonnel (12)	2–6	AS Neuville-sur-Sarthe (10)
30.	AS Saint-Paterne (12)	0–3	US Alpes Mancelles (10)
31.	US Aubinoise (11)	3–1	ASL L'Huisserie Foot (10)
32.	AC Longué (9)	2–2 (7–6 p)	FC Layon (10)
33.	AS Clermont-Créans (9)	4–3	JS Laval Maghreb (9)
34.	US La Chapelle-d'Aligné (10)	1–1 (6–5 p)	SC Anjou (10)
35.	Croix Blanche Angers (9)	2–4	AS Bourny Laval (8)
36.	CS Lion d'Angers (9)	3–0	US Dionysienne (8)
37.	AS Avrillé (9)	0–0 (5–6 p)	US Laval (8)
38.	US Oizé (11)	1–3	CO Castélorien (8)
39.	FC Astillé-Cosmes (10)	0–2	US Combrée-Bel-Air-Noyant (9)
40.	US Marans-Gené (12)	3–3 (5–6 p)	AS Roalderienne (11)
41.	SC Sainte-Gemmes-d'Andigné (9)	4–3	AS Meslay-du-Maine (9)
42.	FC Tiffauges Les Landes (10)	0–5	US Puy-Maz-Tess (9)
43.	FC Mouilleron-Thouarsais-Caillère (10)	0–1	Christophe-Séguinière (8)
44.	FF Mortagne-sur-Sèvre (10)	0–1	AS Longeron-Torfou (9)
45.	JF Cholet (10)	2–2 (4–3 p)	Saint-Martin Treize Septiers (9)
46.	AS Saint-Maixent-sur-Vie (11)	2–3	FC Généraudière Roche Sud (10)
47.	SSJA Saint-Mathurin (11)	2–0	FC Robretières La Roche-sur-Yon (10)
48.	Entente Sud Vendée (10)	2–2 (2–4 p)	US Aubigny (9)
49.	AS Bessay-Corpe (12)	1–4	Loups Sportifs Sainte-Flaive-des-Loups (10)
50.	Amicale Beignon-Basset (12)	1–8	Sainte-Foy FC (10)
51.	FC Saint-Philbert-Réorthe-Jaudonnière (10)	1–2	FC Talmondais (8)
52.	Sud Vendée Football (9)	1–1 (4–2 p)	Luçon FC (8)
53.	FC Oudon-Couffé (11)	1–5	FC Fuilet-Chaussaire (9)
54.	Les Côteaux de la Roche (11)	0–7	FC Laurentais Landemontais (10)
55.	FC Vallons le Pin (10)	4–2	Intrépide Angers Foot (8)
56.	Réveil Saint-Géréon (10)	1–2 (Note: SC Angevin penalised for fielding a suspended player, Réveil Saint-Géréon qualified.)	SC Angevin (8)
57.	UFC Erdre et Donneau (10)	2–2 (4–5 p)	Olympique Bécon-Villemoisan-Saint-Augustin (9)
58.	US Soudan (11)	1–1 (2–4 p)	ES Quelainaise (10)
59.	Abbaretz-Saffré FC (10)	2–0	USA Pouancé (9)
60.	Union Le Mans Sud (10)	1–1 (4–2 p)	US Guécélard (8)
61.	Football Champagné Sport (10)	0–0 (4–5 p)	AS Ruaudin (9)
62.	ES Montfort-le-Gesnois (10)	0–5	US Bouloire (9)
63.	JS Solesmienne (10)	0–0 (4–2 p)	US Mansigné (8)
64.	SC Ballon (11)	2–4	Lombron Sports (9)
65.	FC Val du Loir (10)	1–7	US La Chapelle-Saint-Rémy (9)
66.	US Breilloise (11)	1–4	ÉS Connerré (10)
67.	FC Rouez Crissé (11)	2–3	AS Fyé (11)
68.	Herbadilla Foot (11)	1–0	FC Bouaine Rocheservière (9)
69.	ES Champfleur (11)	1–2	US Conlie Domfront (10)
70.	US Chantenay-Villedieu (11)	1–3	US Villaines-Malicorne (10)
71.	US Saint-Jean-sur-Mayenne (9)	3–1	FC Saint-Georges-Pruillé (8)
72.	FA Laval (11)	1–3	CA Loué (9)
73.	AS Congrier (11)	0–3	Nozay OS (9)
74.	US Toutlemonde Maulévrier (9)	0–1	FC Saint-Laurent Malvent (8)
75.	Maybéléger FC (9)	1–0	ASC Saint-Médard-de-Doulon Nantes (8)
76.	Gaubretière-Saint-Martin FC (11)	0–1	ES La Romagne-Roussay (10)
77.	SomloirYzernay CPF (9)	3–2	BoupèreMonProuant FC (9)
78.	RS Ardelay (9)	2–2 (1–4 p)	Andrezé-Jub-Jallais FC (8)
79.	AS Valanjou (11)	1–2	Val de Sèvre Football (9)
80.	Sainte Christine-Bourgneuf FC (10)	1–2	AS Bruffière Defontaine (10)
81.	Saint-Georges Guyonnière FC (10)	1–7	AS Saint-Hilaire-Vihiers-Saint-Paul (8)
82.	AS Ruffigné (11)	2–3	FC Sud Ouest Mayennais (10)
83.	AS Saint-Pierre d'Angrie (11)	2–0	FC Montjean (11)
84.	Commequiers SF (11)	0–1	Espoir du Marais Sallertaine (9)
85.	CF Châtelais-Nyoiseau-Bouillé-Grugé (11)	0–2	AS Parné (8)
86.	FC Saint-Julien-Vairé (11)	1–4	FC Saligny (9)
87.	ES Grosbreuil-Girouard (11)	1–2	FC Plaine et Bocage (8)
88.	AS Étival (10)	2–1 (Note: Tie reversed from original draw.)	US Vion (10)
89.	JS Ludoise (10)	3–3 (1–4 p)	JS Allonnes (10)
90.	AS Mézeray (11)	1–3	US Bazouges-Cré (9)
91.	FC Dollon-Thorigné (11)	0–4	ES Yvré-l'Évêque (9)
92.	CO Cormes (11)	2–2 (4–3 p)	US Vibraysienne (9)
93.	Sainte-Jamme Sportive (11)	0–3	CS Sablons-Gazonfier (9)
94.	AS Cérans-Foulletourte (10)	1–1 (3–4 p)	Écommoy FC (8)
95.	AC Aigné (11)	3–0	JS Parigné-l'Évêque (10)
96.	AS Parennes (11)	2–5	US Glonnières (10)
97.	US Saint-Ouen Saint-Biez (11)	2–2 (7–8 p)	US Challes-Grand Lucé (10)
98.	US Coulans-La Quinte (10)	1–1 (5–4 p)	AS Saint-Pavace (10)
99.	US Saint-Mars-la-Brière (10)	1–6	SA Mamertins (8)
100.	La Vigilante Mayet (10)	2–4	ES Morannes (10)
101.	CO Laigné-Saint-Gervais (10)	3–2	AS Tiercé-Cheffes (9)
102.	AS Nord Est Anjou (11)	4–2	AS Le Bailleul Crosmières (10)
103.	US Précigné (10)	0–7	Angers Vaillante Foot (8)
104.	SC Tuffé (10)	2–3	Internationale du Mans (8)
105.	AS Saint-Pierre-des-Nids (11)	0–3	FC Ruillé-Loiron (10)
106.	FC Landivy-Pontmain (10)	0–2	US Pays de Juhel (9)
107.	Placé FC (11)	0–2	FC de l'Aisne (9)
108.	AS Lac de Maine (9)	1–2	Le Cellier-Mauves FC (8)
109.	AS Mésanger (9)	5–1	ES Andard-Brain (9)
110.	Herblanetz FC (11)	1–1 (7–6 p)	US Saint-Georges-sur-Loire (11)
111.	FC Bout' Loire-et-Evre (10)	3–0	JA Saint-Mars-du-Désert (10)
112.	ARC Tillières (11)	2–1	AS Sud Loire (10)
113.	ES Belligné-Chapelle-Maumusson (12)	1–1 (4–3 p)	SO Candé Challan Loiré (11)
114.	FC Pouëze-Saint-Clément-Brain (11)	0–4	Petit-Mars FC (9)
115.	CS Saint-Pierre-des-Landes (10)	0–3	AS Andouillé (9)
116.	US Argentré (10)	0–1	ASO Montenay (8)
117.	US La Bazoge-Montpinçon-Belgeard (10)	0–2	Voltigeurs Saint-Georges-Buttavent (9)
118.	AS Oisseau (10)	0–3	FC Lassay-Le Horps (9)
119.	Alerte Ahuillé FC (10)	2–2 (6–7 p)	Hermine Saint-Ouennaise (9)
120.	USB Juvigné (10)	4–2	US Désertines (11)
121.	US Aronnaise (9)	3–3 (7–6 p)	US Saint-Pierre Port-Brillet (8)
122.	EB Commer (10)	2–8	AS Le Bourgneuf-la-Forêt (9)
123.	Larchamp-Montaudin FC (10)	1–2	US Chantrigné (9)
124.	Eclair de Chauvé (10)	3–0	Bernerie OCA (12)
125.	Alerte de Méan (12)	2–1	Arche FC (10)
126.	SC Nantes (13)	1–1 (8–7 p)	FC La Montagne (11)
127.	US Mesnard-Vendrennes (11)	4–1	Les Farfadets Saint-Paul-en-Pareds (10)
128.	US Gouledoisienne (11)	3–4	US Les Epesses-Saint-Mars (10)
129.	FC Meilleraie-Montournais-Menomblet (10)	0–1	FC Mouchamps-Rochetrejoux (9)
130.	AS Quatre Vents Fontaines (10)	4–0	US Autize Vendée (11)
131.	FC Vallée du Graon (11)	1–2	La Chaize FEC (10)
132.	AS Casson (13)	0–15	FC Guémené-Massérac (9)
133.	US Villepot (13)	0–5 (Note: US Villepot further penalised for fielding a suspended player.)	AS Grandchamp Foot (10)
134.	ÉS Trélazé (11)	2–2 (4–3 p)	Ajax Daumeray Football (10)
135.	ES Puy-Vaudelnay (11)	2–1	FC Fief Gesté (10)
136.	UF Loire Louet Layon (11)	4–0	FC Villevêque-Soucelles (10)
137.	Les Hauts d'Anjou FC (12)	1–1 (2–4 p)	Est Anjou FC (11)
138.	ES Varennes Villebernier (12)	2–5	FC Saint-Lambert Saint-Jean Saint-Léger Saint-Martin (11)
139.	US Cantenay-Épinard (11)	0–6	RC Doué-la-Fontaine (9)
140.	FC Plessis Grammoire (12)	0–3	Saint-Melaine OS (9)
141.	FC Longuenée-en-Anjou (10)	0–2 (Note: AS Bayard-Saumur penalised for fielding a suspended player, FC Longuenée-en-Anjou qualified.)	AS Bayard-Saumur (8)
142.	US Briollay (12)	1–7	Saint-Barthélémy-d'Anjou Foot (9)
143.	AS Chazé-Vern (11)	0–4	Saint-Georges Trémentines FC (9)
144.	FC Villedieu-La Renaudière (11)	0–1	CAS Possosavennières (9)
145.	USJA Saint-Martin-Aviré-Louvaine (11)	2–3	AS Chemazé (10)
146.	Aiglons Durtalois (11)	3–2 (Note: ES Gennes-Les Rosiers further penalised for fielding a suspended player.)	ES Gennes-Les Rosiers (11)
147.	AS Ponts-de-Cé (11)	3–1 (Note: AS Ponts-de-Cé penalised for fielding a suspended player, FC Louet-Juignéen qualified.)	FC Louet-Juignéen (11)
148.	Doutre SC (11)	1–3	ASVR Ambillou-Château (10)
149.	Anjou Baconne FC (11)	1–2	AS Val-d'Erdre-Auxence (10)
150.	FC Mesnilaurentais (11)	0–2	Aubry Chaudron FC (10)
151.	US Mazé (11)	0–3	AS Vivy-Neuillé 90 (10)
152.	AC Angers Hauts de Saint-Aubin (11)	14–2	ASR Vernantes-Vernoil (10)
153.	Olympique Sal-Tour Vézins Coron (11)	1–3	Loire Foot Alliance (10)
154.	FC Val de Moine (11)	4–2	ES Haute Goulaine (11)
155.	ES Layon (10)	1–1 (8–7 p)	Saint MathMénitRé FC (11)
156.	Entente Givrand-L'Aiguillon-Landevieille FC (10)	3–1	Coëx Olympique (10)
157.	FC Pays de Palluau (11)	3–0	US Bazoges Beaurepaire (10)
158.	Hirondelles Soullandaises (11)	2–0	US Landeronde-Saint-Georges (10)
159.	Saint-Gilles-Saint-Hilaire FC (10)	2–0	Saint-Pierre Sportif Nieul-le-Dolent (10)
160.	FC Nieul-Maillezais-Les Autises (11)	1–1 (3–4 p)	Foot Espoir 85 (10)
161.	FC Falleron-Froidfond (10)	1–1 (4–2 p)	ES Belleville-sur-Vie (10)
162.	AS Sigournais-Saint Germain (11)	3–2	US La Ferrière Dompierre (10)
163.	Héric FC (10)	1–1 (5–4 p)	Don Bosco Football Nantes (8)
164.	Saint-Médard Football (11)	2–2 (5–4 p)	Saint Pierre de Retz Football (8)
165.	Union Méan Penhoët Saint-Nazaire (11)	2–8	ES Pornichet (8)
166.	FC Côte Sauvage (11)	1–4	Savenay-Malville-Prinquiau FC (8)
167.	ES Maritime (11)	2–2 (4–5 p)	AOS Pontchâteau (8)
168.	AS Guillaumois (11)	1–1 (4–2 p)	La Guinéenne de l'Association de Loire Atlantique (10)
169.	Donges FC (10)	5–2	FC Presqu'île Vilaine (11)
170.	Océane FC (10)	2–3	Couëron Chabossière FC (8)
171.	CCS Nantes Saint-Félix (12)	0–2	CS Montoirin (9)
172.	JGE Sucé-sur-Erdre (9)	10–2	Étoile du Cens Nantes (12)
173.	FC Logne et Boulogne (12)	1–4	FC Boboto (10)
174.	AS Sion-Lusanger (12)	0–5	SC Avessac-Fégréac (10)
175.	Goelands Sammaritains (12)	0–5	Sainte-Reine-Crossac Football (10)
176.	ÉS Riez Fenouiller (10)	2–4	JA Nesmy (10)
177.	AF Apremont-La Chapelle (10)	4–0	USSA Montréverd (10)
178.	Étoile Mouzillon Foot (11)	0–5	Espérance Saint-Yves Nantes (10)
179.	FC Bourgneuf-en-Retz (11)	3–1	Nantes Sud 98 (9)
180.	US Alverne (11)	1–1 (8–9 p)	Orvault RC (11)
181.	Saint-Herblain OC (10)	2–0	FC Le Gavre Le Chevallerais (11)
182.	CA Vouvantais/US Glainoise (11)	0–2	Les Touches FC (11)
183.	ÉS du Lac (11)	2–0	Legé FC (11)
184.	FC Trois Rivières (11)	0–2	Union Brivet Campbon Chapelle-Launay (9)
185.	FC Estuaire (11)	2–4	Amicale Saint-Lyphard (10)
186.	US Bugallière Orvault (11)	0–11	FC Fay Bouvron (9)
187.	Saint-Vincent LUSTVI (10)	3–0	ÉS Jovéenne (11)
188.	Étoile du Don Moisdon-Meilleraye (12)	1–5	Saint-Joseph de Porterie Nantes (10)
189.	ES Rougé (12)	0–7	Sympho Foot Treillières (9)
190.	FC Brière (10)	1–0	Missilac FC (12)
191.	US Guérinoise (11)	0–0 (4–3 p)	Saint-Cyr Foot Herbignac (10)
192.	Métallo Sport Chantenaysien (11)	3–3 (5–4 p)	Nantes Saint-Pierre (11)
193.	US Basse-Indre (11)	3–3 (5–3 p) (Note: US Basse-Indre penalised for fielding a player who was unlicensed, due to not having a validated medical certificate, FC Toutes Aides Nantes qualified.)	FC Toutes Aides Nantes (10)
194.	RAC Cheminots Nantes (11)	1–3	Bouguenais Football (10)
195.	FC Basse Loire (10)	4–1	FC Loire et Sillon (11)
196.	AS Dom-Tom (11)	1–6	US Saint-Michel Triaize La Tranche Angles (9)
197.	ES Longevillaise (10)	1–3	FC La Génétouze (9)
198.	JF Boissière-des-Landes (11)	1–3	Pays de Chantonnay Foot (8)
199.	RS Les Clouzeaux (11)	1–2 (Note: RS Les Clouzeaux further penalised for fielding a suspended player.)	US Herminoise (9)
200.	Gorron FC (10)	0–2	AS La Chapelle-Saint-Aubin (8)

=== Second round ===
These matches were played on 31 August 2025.

Second Round Results: Pays de la Loire
Tie no	Home team (Tier)	Score	Away team (Tier)
1.	US Pays de Juhel (9)	0–2 (Note: Auvers Poillé Brulon FC penalised for fielding a suspended player, US Pays de Juhel qualified.)	Auvers Poillé Brulon FC (8)
2.	AS Bourny Laval (8)	1–1 (6–5 p)	US Nautique Spay (7)
3.	AS Parné (8)	0–0 (7–6 p)	FC Saint-Saturnin-La Milesse (7)
4.	AS Andouillé (9)	0–2	Beaumont SA (7)
5.	US Challes-Grand Lucé (10)	1–3	ASPTT Le Mans (9)
6.	ÉS Connerré (10)	1–1 (1–3 p)	SA Mamertins (8)
7.	CA Loué (9)	0–3	EA Baugeois (7)
8.	US Conlie Domfront (10)	0–0 (4–5 p)	USC Pays de Montsurs (8)
9.	US La Chapelle-Saint-Rémy (9)	0–6	VS Fertois (7)
10.	Saint-Barthélémy-d'Anjou Foot (9)	0–0 (3–4 p)	La Flèche RC (8)
11.	AS Saint-Jean-d'Assé (9)	2–3	Ernéenne Foot (8)
12.	CS Sablons-Gazonfier (9)	2–4	US Entrammes (8)
13.	Lombron Sports (9)	2–2 (4–1 p)	AS Mulsanne-Teloché (8)
14.	AS Vivy-Neuillé 90 (10)	3–3 (3–4 p)	EG Rouillon (8)
15.	SS Noyen-sur-Sarthe (9)	3–0	FC Château-Gontier (8)
16.	AS Ruaudin (9)	1–2	Stade Mayennais FC (7)
17.	FC Plaine et Bocage (8)	3–0	Maybéléger FC (9)
18.	FC Généraudière Roche Sud (10)	0–3	FC Cécilien Martinoyen (8)
19.	Espoir du Marais Sallertaine (9)	3–3 (6–7 p)	FC Achards (8)
20.	Foot Espoir 85 (10)	4–0	SSJA Saint-Mathurin (11)
21.	AS Sigournais-Saint Germain (11)	2–6	ES Rives de l'Yon (9)
22.	SC Trangé-Chaufour-Degré (10)	1–0	Louverné Sports (8)
23.	JS Solesmienne (10)	1–2	AS La Chapelle-Saint-Aubin (8)
24.	JS Allonnes (10)	1–7 (Note: Match abandoned after 60 minutes, after a brawl which resulted in a visiting player attacking players in the home team dugout. After review by the league, both teams were removed from the competition.)	CS Changé (8)
25.	US Glonnières (10)	0–2	ES Moncé (8)
26.	FC La Bazoge (9)	2–1	La Patriote Bonnétable (8)
27.	FC Pays de Palluau (11)	3–4	Pays de Chantonnay Foot (8)
28.	US Herminoise (9)	2–1	AF Apremont-La Chapelle (10)
29.	Saint-Michel SF (9)	0–9	Élan de Gorges Foot (7)
30.	FC Sud Sèvre et Maine (10)	0–4	Montaigu Vendée Football (7)
31.	ARC Tillières (11)	0–0 (5–6 p)	FC Essarts Boulogne Merlatière (7)
32.	Aubry Chaudron FC (10)	2–3	Entente Cheffois-Antigny-Saint-Maurice (8)
33.	ASVR Ambillou-Château (10)	1–2	Sèvremont FC (8)
34.	US Mesnard-Vendrennes (11)	0–1	Andrezé-Jub-Jallais FC (8)
35.	AS Bruffière Defontaine (10)	1–2	FC Pellouailles-Corze (7)
36.	US Les Epesses-Saint-Mars (10)	0–1	Olympique Chemillé-Melay (7)
37.	FC Mouchamps-Rochetrejoux (9)	1–1 (3–5 p)	AS Saint-Pierre-Montrevault (7)
38.	FC Saint-Laurent Malvent (8)	0–2	SO Cholet (7)
39.	Val de Sèvre Football (9)	1–2	Saint-André-Saint-Macaire FC (7)
40.	AS Mésanger (9)	1–2	ES Segré (7)
41.	Réveil Saint-Géréon (10)	0–4	SC Orée Loire (7)
42.	JA Nesmy (10)	1–2	Sud Vendée Football (9)
43.	US Bazouges-Cré (9)	1–2	AS Saint-Sylvain-d'Anjou (8)
44.	US Villaines-Malicorne (10)	1–9	AS Clermont-Créans (9)
45.	AS Fyé (11)	0–3	Gazélec Le Mans (8)
46.	ES Yvré-l'Évêque (9)	2–4	CA Évronnais (8)
47.	AS Étival (10)	0–6	AS Martigné-sur-Mayenne (8)
48.	ÉS Trélazé (11)	0–5	Écommoy FC (8)
49.	FC Louet-Juignéen (11)	1–3	Vigilante Saint Fulgent (8)
50.	AL Châteaubriant (9)	0–4	US Saint-Berthevin (8)
51.	US Aubinoise (11)	2–2 (3–4 p)	US Laval (8)
52.	Alliance Sud-Retz Machecoul (9)	1–3	ES Marsouins Brétignolles-Brem (7)
53.	Saint-Gilles-Saint-Hilaire FC (10)	1–0	FC Grand Lieu (7)
54.	Jeunes d'Erbray (8)	1–3	US Méral-Cossé (7)
55.	Sainte-Foy FC (10)	3–0	AS Quatre Vents Fontaines (10)
56.	US Saint-Michel Triaize La Tranche Angles (9)	0–5	Mouilleron SF (7)
57.	FC Talmondais (8)	1–1 (4–3 p)	US Bournezeau-Saint-Hilaire (8)
58.	Hermitage Venansault (10)	0–0 (1–3 p)	US Aubigny (9)
59.	FC Saligny (9)	3–1	Entente Givrand-L'Aiguillon-Landevieille FC (10)
60.	Loups Sportifs Sainte-Flaive-des-Loups (10)	3–3 (3–0 p)	FC La Génétouze (9)
61.	La Chaize FEC (10)	0–5	Jard-Avrillé-Moutiers-Saint-Avaugourd FC (8)
62.	US Tennie-Saint-Symphorien (10)	0–3	CO Laigné-Saint-Gervais (10)
63.	US Alpes Mancelles (10)	2–2 (5–4 p)	Union Le Mans Sud (10)
64.	AS Neuville-sur-Sarthe (10)	3–1	AC Aigné (11)
65.	US Coulans-La Quinte (10)	1–1 (2–4 p)	Internationale du Mans (8)
66.	FC Craonnais (8)	0–0 (3–4 p)	SC Sainte-Gemmes-d'Andigné (9)
67.	CO Cormes (11)	1–1 (1–4 p)	US Bouloire (9)
68.	US La Chapelle-d'Aligné (10)	0–4	ASI Mûrs-Erigné (7)
69.	AS Juigné-sur-Sarthe (10)	0–0 (2–4 p)	NDC Angers (7)
70.	ES Morannes (10)	0–4	CO Castélorien (8)
71.	US Varades (8)	5–0	FC Sud Ouest Mayennais (10)
72.	AS Chemazé (10)	2–0	AS Saint-Pierre d'Angrie (11)
73.	US Forcé (9)	1–1 (4–5 p)	Angers Vaillante Foot (8)
74.	ES Quelainaise (10)	1–1 (5–4 p)	US Combrée-Bel-Air-Noyant (9)
75.	Olympique Bécon-Villemoisan-Saint-Augustin (9)	4–1	US Villiers-Charlemagne (10)
76.	AS Roalderienne (11)	0–11	AC Angers Hauts de Saint-Aubin (11)
77.	FC Laurentais Landemontais (10)	5–1	CS Lion d'Angers (9)
78.	AS Val-d'Erdre-Auxence (10)	1–4	Christophe-Séguinière (8)
79.	FC Bourgneuf-en-Retz (11)	1–2	FC Falleron-Froidfond (10)
80.	Herbadilla Foot (11)	0–8	FC Chavagnes-La Rabatelière (8)
81.	ES des Marais (9)	1–3	FO Cope Chauché (8)
82.	Hirondelles Soullandaises (11)	0–1	AS Vieillevigne-La Planche (8)
83.	FC Entente du Vignoble (9)	3–4	AS Boufféré (9)
84.	FC Retz (9)	0–0 (3–4 p)	US Bernardière-Cugand (9)
85.	Hermine Saint-Ouennaise (9)	2–2 (3–4 p)	AS Seiches-sur-le-Loire-Marcé (8)
86.	ES Puy-Vaudelnay (11)	0–3	AS Saint-Hilaire-Vihiers-Saint-Paul (8)
87.	Espérance Saint-Yves Nantes (10)	1–7	Football Chalonnes-Chaudefonds (7)
88.	Herblanetz FC (11)	0–6	ES Aubance (7)
89.	FC Ruillé-Loiron (10)	1–5	ASO Montenay (8)
90.	US Chantrigné (9)	3–3 (4–3 p)	US Aronnaise (9)
91.	FC Vallons le Pin (10)	0–4	FE Trélazé (8)
92.	Métallo Sport Chantenaysien (11)	0–3	Pomjeannais JA (8)
93.	Saint-Joseph de Porterie Nantes (10)	0–3	FC Beaupréau La Chapelle (8)
94.	Est Anjou FC (11)	3–3 (4–2 p)	Saint-Melaine OS (9)
95.	AS Nord Est Anjou (11)	0–0 (1–3 p)	FC Longuenée-en-Anjou (10)
96.	RC Doué-la-Fontaine (9)	2–3	ES La Romagne-Roussay (10)
97.	Loire Foot Alliance (10)	2–3	AC Longué (9)
98.	FC de l'Aisne (9)	1–5	AS Contest-Saint Baudelle (8)
99.	FC Lassay-Le Horps (9)	0–2	FC Soulgé-sur-Ouette Louvigné (8)
100.	SC Avessac-Fégréac (10)	3–4	AOS Pontchâteau (8)
101.	Saint-Vincent LUSTVI (10)	0–2	JGE Sucé-sur-Erdre (9)
102.	SC Nantes (13)	1–1 (5–6 p)	AEPR Rezé (9)
103.	USB Juvigné (10)	0–1	US Saint-Jean-sur-Mayenne (9)
104.	Voltigeurs Saint-Georges-Buttavent (9)	1–5	Ambrières Cigné Football (8)
105.	Moulay Sports (10)	5–5 (4–5 p)	AS Le Bourgneuf-la-Forêt (9)
106.	CAS Possosavennières (9)	0–4	JF Cholet (10)
107.	Saint-Georges Trémentines FC (9)	2–0	ES Layon (10)
108.	AS Longeron-Torfou (9)	3–2	FC Bout' Loire-et-Evre (10)
109.	FC Val de Moine (11)	2–1	SomloirYzernay CPF (9)
110.	Aiglons Durtalois (11)	2–2 (3–5 p)	US Beaufort-en-Vallée (8)
111.	FC Saint-Lambert Saint-Jean Saint-Léger Saint-Martin (11)	3–0	UF Loire Louet Layon (11)
112.	US Puy-Maz-Tess (9)	2–1	ES Bouchemaine (8)
113.	Petit-Mars FC (9)	1–2	Montreuil-Juigné Béné Football (8)
114.	FC Brière (10)	2–7	Saint-Aubin-Guérande Football (8)
115.	FC Fuilet-Chaussaire (9)	2–2 (5–4 p)	FC Boboto (10)
116.	Donges FC (10)	1–2	ES Pornichet (8)
117.	Eclair de Chauvé (10)	2–2 (3–4 p)	Pornic Foot (7)
118.	Alerte de Méan (12)	0–3	Sainte-Reine-Crossac Football (10)
119.	Les Touches FC (11)	1–2	AC Chapelain Foot (8)
120.	ES Vertou (9)	0–2	Nort ACF (7)
121.	AS Grandchamp Foot (10)	0–4	USJA Carquefou (7)
122.	CS Montoirin (9)	0–4	FC La Chapelle-des-Marais (7)
123.	Amicale Saint-Lyphard (10)	1–3	AS Sautron (7)
124.	Nozay OS (9)	0–6	SC Nord Atlantique (7)
125.	FC Toutes Aides Nantes (10)	3–3 (3–4 p)	Landreau-Loroux OSC (8)
126.	Orvault RC (11)	0–0 (4–3 p)	AC Saint-Brevin (8)
127.	FC Guémené-Massérac (9)	2–1	ES Vigneux (7)
128.	Sympho Foot Treillières (9)	0–1	FC Mouzeil-Teillé-Ligné (8)
129.	Bouguenais Football (10)	0–1	US Thouaré (8)
130.	US Guérinoise (11)	0–1	Le Cellier-Mauves FC (8)
131.	FC Basse Loire (10)	0–3	US Lucéene (8)
132.	FC Fay Bouvron (9)	0–2	ES Dresny-Plessé (8)
133.	FC Bouaye (8)	1–2	AC Basse-Goulaine (7)
134.	Abbaretz-Saffré FC (10)	5–0	ES Belligné-Chapelle-Maumusson (12)
135.	UF Saint-Herblain (8)	1–2	JSC Bellevue Nantes (7)
136.	Nantes La Mellinet (8)	2–1	La Saint-André (7)
137.	FC Rezé (8)	2–7	AS La Madeleine (7)
138.	Héric FC (10)	0–2	ES Blain (7)
139.	AS Guillaumois (11)	0–6	Savenay-Malville-Prinquiau FC (8)
140.	Saint-Médard Football (11)	3–3 (5–4 p)	Saint-Herblain OC (10)
141.	Couëron Chabossière FC (8)	1–3	Saint-Marc Football (8)
142.	Union Brivet Campbon Chapelle-Launay (9)	0–2	RC Ancenis 44 (8)
143.	ÉS du Lac (11)	0–7	Elan Sorinières Football (7)

=== Third round ===
These matches were played on 13 and 14 September 2025.

Third Round Results: Pays de la Loire
Tie no	Home team (Tier)	Score	Away team (Tier)
1.	AC Basse-Goulaine (7)	1–5	Vendée Poiré-sur-Vie Football (5)
2.	Ambrières Cigné Football (8)	1–1 (9–8 p)	ES Bonchamp (6)
3.	Montaigu Vendée Football (7)	2–1	US Lucéene (8)
4.	AC Longué (9)	5–0	Lombron Sports (9)
5.	AEPR Rezé (9)	1–2	FC Talmondais (8)
6.	EA Baugeois (7)	1–3	AS Parné (8)
7.	AS Neuville-sur-Sarthe (10)	0–5	USSA Vertou (5)
8.	AS La Madeleine (7)	3–0	Vigilante Saint Fulgent (8)
9.	ES Rives de l'Yon (9)	0–5	AS Saint-Pierre-Montrevault (7)
10.	Beaumont SA (7)	3–0	AS Martigné-sur-Mayenne (8)
11.	Le Cellier-Mauves FC (8)	1–1 (4–2 p)	US Varades (8)
12.	FC Laurentais Landemontais (10)	4–1	US Beaufort-en-Vallée (8)
13.	US Alpes Mancelles (10)	0–7	SC Beaucouzé (6)
14.	FC Saint-Lambert Saint-Jean Saint-Léger Saint-Martin (11)	1–4	EG Rouillon (8)
15.	CA Évronnais (8)	0–0 (5–4 p)	La Suze Roëzé FC (6)
16.	FC Falleron-Froidfond (10)	0–0 (3–4 p)	FC Fuilet-Chaussaire (9)
17.	FC Longuenée-en-Anjou (10)	2–5	Saint-Aubin-Guérande Football (8)
18.	FC Achards (8)	1–3	AS La Châtaigneraie (5)
19.	Elan Sorinières Football (7)	0–3	ES Blain (7)
20.	ASI Mûrs-Erigné (7)	1–3	US La Baule-Le Pouliguen (6)
21.	CO Castélorien (8)	1–4	SO Cholet (7)
22.	US Entrammes (8)	1–0	ES Montilliers (6)
23.	AS Saint-Hilaire-Vihiers-Saint-Paul (8)	5–0	US Aubigny (9)
24.	FC Essarts Boulogne Merlatière (7)	2–1	Saint-Marc Football (8)
25.	JGE Sucé-sur-Erdre (9)	1–1 (3–4 p)	US Saint-Jean-sur-Mayenne (9)
26.	AS Seiches-sur-le-Loire-Marcé (8)	1–1 (6–5 p)	US Changé (6)
27.	FC Val de Moine (11)	1–1 (4–5 p)	FC Chavagnes-La Rabatelière (8)
28.	ASPTT Le Mans (9)	0–2	ES Moncé (8)
29.	Sèvremont FC (8)	2–3	Pays de Chantonnay Foot (8)
30.	Saint-Gilles-Saint-Hilaire FC (10)	3–3 (4–3 p)	Christophe-Séguinière (8)
31.	Saint-André-Saint-Macaire FC (7)	2–2 (3–0 p)	AS Sautron (7)
32.	US Pays de Juhel (9)	0–5	Sablé FC (6)
33.	ES La Romagne-Roussay (10)	1–5	AS Vieillevigne-La Planche (8)
34.	AC Angers Hauts de Saint-Aubin (11)	0–1	Nantes La Mellinet (8)
35.	US Saint-Berthevin (8)	4–2	Olympique Bécon-Villemoisan-Saint-Augustin (9)
36.	US Bouloire (9)	1–2	La Flèche RC (8)
37.	USC Pays de Montsurs (8)	0–2	USJA Carquefou (7)
38.	US Puy-Maz-Tess (9)	0–2	US Méral-Cossé (7)
39.	Mouilleron SF (7)	2–0	Saint-Sébastien FC (6)
40.	US Bernardière-Cugand (9)	1–4	Mareuil SC (6)
41.	Football Chalonnes-Chaudefonds (7)	0–1	Vendée Fontenay Foot (5)
42.	Sud Vendée Football (9)	2–1	Andrezé-Jub-Jallais FC (8)
43.	AS Boufféré (9)	3–2	AOS Pontchâteau (8)
44.	VS Fertois (7)	– (Note: VS Fertois qualify automatically, due to JS Allonnes and CS Changé being removed from the competition in the previous round.)	bye
45.	Loups Sportifs Sainte-Flaive-des-Loups (10)	0–1	FC Plaine et Bocage (8)
46.	AS Saint-Sylvain-d'Anjou (8)	1–1 (4–3 p)	Saint-Nazaire AF (6)
47.	RC Ancenis 44 (8)	3–3 (3–5 p)	FC La Chapelle-des-Marais (7)
48.	AS Chemazé (10)	0–1	US Laval (8)
49.	SC Trangé-Chaufour-Degré (10)	0–0 (1–2 p)	NDC Angers (7)
50.	AS Longeron-Torfou (9)	1–3	ESOF La Roche-sur-Yon (6)
51.	Sainte-Reine-Crossac Football (10)	0–2	ES Aubance (7)
52.	Landreau-Loroux OSC (8)	0–3	FE Trélazé (8)
53.	SA Mamertins (8)	0–3	Ancienne Château-Gontier (6)
54.	Est Anjou FC (11)	0–7	Élan de Gorges Foot (7)
55.	Entente Cheffois-Antigny-Saint-Maurice (8)	0–3	FC Challans (5)
56.	AS Le Bourgneuf-la-Forêt (9)	1–5	ASO Montenay (8)
57.	Orvault RC (11)	2–0	FC Cécilien Martinoyen (8)
58.	AS Clermont-Créans (9)	2–3	SC Orée Loire (7)
59.	Pomjeannais JA (8)	0–4	JS Coulaines (6)
60.	FC Saligny (9)	1–5	Orvault SF (6)
61.	AS La Chapelle-Saint-Aubin (8)	0–2	Gazélec Le Mans (8)
62.	US Chantrigné (9)	0–7	Stade Mayennais FC (7)
63.	ES Quelainaise (10)	0–1	AS Bourny Laval (8)
64.	Ernéenne Foot (8)	2–2 (3–4 p)	SC Nord Atlantique (7)
65.	Abbaretz-Saffré FC (10)	4–3	ES Segré (7)
66.	FC Mouzeil-Teillé-Ligné (8)	2–2 (1–3 p)	Saint-Georges Trémentines FC (9)
67.	JSC Bellevue Nantes (7)	1–2	Les Sables VF (5)
68.	Sainte-Foy FC (10)	4–1	Jard-Avrillé-Moutiers-Saint-Avaugourd FC (8)
69.	Savenay-Malville-Prinquiau FC (8)	1–1 (5–4 p)	Montreuil-Juigné Béné Football (8)
70.	AC Chapelain Foot (8)	1–8	La France d'Aizenay (6)
71.	Écommoy FC (8)	5–1	SC Sainte-Gemmes-d'Andigné (9)
72.	US Thouaré (8)	3–1	ES Marsouins Brétignolles-Brem (7)
73.	Saint-Médard Football (11)	0–5	FC Saint-Julien Divatte (6)
74.	Angers Vaillante Foot (8)	2–1	FC La Bazoge (9)
75.	CO Laigné-Saint-Gervais (10)	2–1	SS Noyen-sur-Sarthe (9)
76.	JF Cholet (10)	2–1	US Herminoise (9)
77.	ES Pornichet (8)	0–0 (4–5 p)	ES Dresny-Plessé (8)
78.	FC Soulgé-sur-Ouette Louvigné (8)	3–3 (1–4 p)	Olympique Chemillé-Melay (7)
79.	Pornic Foot (7)	1–0	FC Pellouailles-Corze (7)
80.	FC Beaupréau La Chapelle (8)	5–1	Internationale du Mans (8)
81.	FC Guémené-Massérac (9)	0–0 (2–4 p)	Nort ACF (7)
82.	AS Contest-Saint Baudelle (8)	0–4	AS Le Mans Villaret (6)
83.	FO Cope Chauché (8)	0–8	US Philbertine Football (5)
84.	Foot Espoir 85 (10)	0–6	Pouzauges Bocage FC (6)

=== Fourth round ===
These matches were played on 27 and 28 September 2025.

Fourth Round Results: Pays de la Loire
Tie no	Home team (Tier)	Score	Away team (Tier)
1.	Sablé FC (6)	4–1	Mouilleron SF (7)
2.	Pays de Chantonnay Foot (8)	6–2	US Laval (8)
3.	FC Plaine et Bocage (8)	2–1	Saint-Georges Trémentines FC (9)
4.	EG Rouillon (8)	0–7	Les Sables VF (5)
5.	Élan de Gorges Foot (7)	2–1	Olympique Chemillé-Melay (7)
6.	Le Cellier-Mauves FC (8)	3–3 (3–0 p)	Mareuil SC (6)
7.	Orvault RC (11)	2–2 (4–5 p)	FC Essarts Boulogne Merlatière (7)
8.	US Saint-Jean-sur-Mayenne (9)	1–2	ES Blain (7)
9.	USSA Vertou (5)	1–6	VFC La Roche-sur-Yon (4)
10.	ES Dresny-Plessé (8)	1–1 (1–4 p)	AS Seiches-sur-le-Loire-Marcé (8)
11.	FC Beaupréau La Chapelle (8)	1–2	US La Baule-Le Pouliguen (6)
12.	SO Cholet (7)	2–0	AS Saint-Sylvain-d'Anjou (8)
13.	USJA Carquefou (7)	1–1 (3–5 p)	AS La Madeleine (7)
14.	AS Bourny Laval (8)	0–1	Olympique Saumur FC (4)
15.	AS Parné (8)	3–3 (3–4 p)	CA Évronnais (8)
16.	Abbaretz-Saffré FC (10)	1–3	Gazélec Le Mans (8)
17.	Saint-Aubin-Guérande Football (8)	4–1	AS Boufféré (9)
18.	La Flèche RC (8)	1–2	Ancienne Château-Gontier (6)
19.	Saint-Gilles-Saint-Hilaire FC (10)	1–3	AS Vieillevigne-La Planche (8)
20.	FC Challans (5)	2–1	FC Saint-Julien Divatte (6)
21.	NDC Angers (7)	1–0	US Méral-Cossé (7)
22.	AS Le Mans Villaret (6)	2–0	Vendée Poiré-sur-Vie Football (5)
23.	JF Cholet (10)	0–0 (1–4 p)	ES Moncé (8)
24.	Nort ACF (7)	3–1	US Thouaré (8)
25.	FC Laurentais Landemontais (10)	1–0	US Entrammes (8)
26.	SC Nord Atlantique (7)	1–1 (5–4 p)	AS Saint-Hilaire-Vihiers-Saint-Paul (8)
27.	ES Aubance (7)	0–3	FC La Chapelle-des-Marais (7)
28.	FC Chavagnes-La Rabatelière (8)	1–2	FC Fuilet-Chaussaire (9)
29.	Stade Mayennais FC (7)	0–1	Pouzauges Bocage FC (6)
30.	Nantes La Mellinet (8)	1–2	JS Coulaines (6)
31.	FC Talmondais (8)	1–4	Vendée Fontenay Foot (5)
32.	US Saint-Berthevin (8)	3–4	Orvault SF (6)
33.	AS La Châtaigneraie (5)	2–1	Voltigeurs de Châteaubriant (4)
34.	ASO Montenay (8)	2–1	Angers Vaillante Foot (8)
35.	Écommoy FC (8)	1–1 (3–4 p)	La France d'Aizenay (6)
36.	AC Longué (9)	0–3	Pornic Foot (7)
37.	Savenay-Malville-Prinquiau FC (8)	2–3	SC Beaucouzé (6)
38.	Ambrières Cigné Football (8)	0–2	Les Herbiers VF (4)
39.	SC Orée Loire (7)	3–1	VS Fertois (7)
40.	CO Laigné-Saint-Gervais (10)	1–1 (5–3 p)	Sud Vendée Football (9)
41.	Sainte-Foy FC (10)	0–1	Beaumont SA (7)
42.	FE Trélazé (8)	0–2	US Philbertine Football (5)
43.	AS Saint-Pierre-Montrevault (7)	6–1	Saint-André-Saint-Macaire FC (7)
44.	ESOF La Roche-sur-Yon (6)	3–3 (3–2 p)	Montaigu Vendée Football (7)

=== Fifth round ===
These matches were played on 11 and 12 October 2025.

Fifth Round Results: Pays de la Loire
Tie no	Home team (Tier)	Score	Away team (Tier)
1.	FC Laurentais Landemontais (10)	0–7	Les Herbiers VF (4)
2.	AS La Madeleine (7)	2–2 (3–4 p) (Note: Tie reversed from original draw.)	Saint-Aubin-Guérande Football (8)
3.	Olympique Saumur FC (4)	1–4	FC Challans (5)
4.	Pays de Chantonnay Foot (8)	3–4	AS Le Mans Villaret (6)
5.	AS Seiches-sur-le-Loire-Marcé (8)	0–3	Ancienne Château-Gontier (6)
6.	AS Vieillevigne-La Planche (8)	1–1 (7–6 p)	SC Nord Atlantique (7)
7.	ES Blain (7)	2–2 (5–3 p)	JS Coulaines (6)
8.	FC La Chapelle-des-Marais (7)	2–2 (4–5 p)	La France d'Aizenay (6)
9.	SO Cholet (7)	0–0 (16–17 p)	Vendée Fontenay Foot (5)
10.	FC Essarts Boulogne Merlatière (7)	2–2 (3–5 p)	Le Cellier-Mauves FC (8)
11.	ESOF La Roche-sur-Yon (6)	1–1 (4–2 p)	AS Saint-Pierre-Montrevault (7)
12.	Beaumont SA (7)	2–0	Nort ACF (7)
13.	Gazélec Le Mans (8)	2–2 (6–5 p)	Élan de Gorges Foot (7)
14.	VFC La Roche-sur-Yon (4)	5–1	US Philbertine Football (5)
15.	SC Orée Loire (7)	0–5	Les Sables VF (5)
16.	Pornic Foot (7)	1–1 (9–10 p)	SC Beaucouzé (6)
17.	FC Fuilet-Chaussaire (9)	5–2	CO Laigné-Saint-Gervais (10)
18.	ASO Montenay (8)	0–5	AS La Châtaigneraie (5)
19.	FC Plaine et Bocage (8)	0–4	US La Baule-Le Pouliguen (6)
20.	ES Moncé (8)	1–4	Sablé FC (6)
21.	CA Évronnais (8)	1–0	NDC Angers (7)
22.	Orvault SF (6)	2–1	Pouzauges Bocage FC (6)

=== Sixth round ===
These matches were played on 25 and 26 October 2025.

Sixth Round Results: Pays de la Loire
Tie no	Home team (Tier)	Score	Away team (Tier)
1.	AS Le Mans Villaret (6)	1–4	Sablé FC (6)
2.	ES Blain (7)	0–8	FC Challans (5)
3.	CA Évronnais (8)	0–3	Les Sables VF (5)
4.	FC Fuilet-Chaussaire (9)	1–5	La France d'Aizenay (6)
5.	Le Cellier-Mauves FC (8)	2–0	Saint-Aubin-Guérande Football (8)
6.	AS Vieillevigne-La Planche (8)	0–5	Vendée Fontenay Foot (5)
7.	US La Baule-Le Pouliguen (6)	1–4	Les Herbiers VF (4)
8.	Beaumont SA (7)	1–1 (4–2 p)	AS La Châtaigneraie (5)
9.	Gazélec Le Mans (8)	0–2	Ancienne Château-Gontier (6)
10.	Orvault SF (6)	1–1 (3–1 p)	VFC La Roche-sur-Yon (4)
11.	SC Beaucouzé (6)	3–2	ESOF La Roche-sur-Yon (6)
