= 2024–25 Coupe de France preliminary rounds, Pays de la Loire =

The 2024–25 Coupe de France preliminary rounds, Pays de la Loire was the qualifying competition to decide which teams from the leagues of the Pays de la Loire region of France took part in the main competition from the seventh round.

A total of eleven teams qualified from the Pays de la Loire preliminary rounds.

In 2023–24, FC Challans and Les Herbiers VF both progressed to the Round of 64, before losing to higher tier opposition at home. Challans were defeated 4–0 by Ligue 2 side Rodez AF, whilst Les Herbiers were knocked out on penalties by Championnat National side LB Châteauroux on penalties, after a 2–2 draw.

== Draws and fixtures ==
The Pays de la Loire league published the first round draw on 2 August 2024. Three days later, they published the full structure of the competition, confirming a total of 516 teams from the region had entered, and that 414 teams would take part in the first round, including all teams from the District levels and all but 29 teams from the Régional 3 division. The second round would include the remainder of the Régional 3 teams and 40 teams from Régional 2. The third round would include 17 teams from Régional 1 and 7 teams from Championnat National 3. The 5 teams from Championnat National 2 would enter at the fourth round stage, and the sole team from Championnat National would enter at the fifth round stage.

The second round draw was published on 28 August 2024. The third round draw was published on 12 September 2024. The fourth round draw took place on 18 September 2024, with the results published on 20 September 2024. The fifth round draw took place on 2 October 2024, with the results published a day later. The sixth round draw was made live on the league's official Facebook page on 16 October 2024.

=== First round ===
These matches were played on 25 August 2024.

First Round Results: Pays de la Loire
Tie no	Home team (Tier)	Score	Away team (Tier)
1.	US Conlie Domfront (10)	1–8	US Saint-Berthevin (8)
2.	FC Pays de Sillé (10)	1–1 (7–8 p)	US Laval (8)
3.	US Alpes Mancelles (10)	3–2	ASO Montenay (8)
4.	ES Champfleur (10)	1–4	FC Lassay-Le Horps (8)
5.	FC Val du Loir (10)	3–5	ES Yvré-l'Évêque (8)
6.	US Saint-Ouen Saint-Biez (11)	2–4	CO Castélorien (8)
7.	JS Solesmienne (10)	0–3	AS Clermont-Créans (8)
8.	SC Trangé-Chaufour-Degré (10)	5–4	AS Vaiges (9)
9.	AS Saint-Pavace (10)	0–3	USC Pays de Montsurs (8)
10.	AS Étival (10)	3–1	FC Soulgé-sur-Ouette Louvigné (8)
11.	US Savigné-l'Évêque (10)	2–16	VS Fertois (8)
12.	CO Cormes (12)	0–2	US Saint-Mars-la-Brière (10)
13.	AS Saint-Paterne (12)	1–10	US Vibraysienne (9)
14.	US Combrée-Bel-Air-Noyant (9)	2–2 (3–1 p)	ASPTT Laval (8)
15.	FC Villevêque-Soucelles (10)	1–1 (4–3 p)	SC Anjou (9)
16.	AS Saint-Pierre d'Angrie (10)	2–1	US Dionysienne (9)
17.	ES Morannes (10)	2–2 (5–4 p)	US Bazouges-Cré (9)
18.	Anjou Baconne FC (11)	0–3	SS Noyen-sur-Sarthe (9)
19.	Ajax Daumeray Football (10)	0–4 (Note: US Mansigné penalised for fielding a suspended player, Ajax Daumeray Football qualify.)	US Mansigné (9)
20.	Aiglons Durtalois (11)	1–1 (3–5 p)	Écommoy FC (8)
21.	US Oizé (11)	1–5	FC Longuenée-en-Anjou (9)
22.	US Briollay (11)	2–2 (4–2 p)	JS Ludoise (10)
23.	AS Juigné-sur-Sarthe (10)	0–3	AS Saint-Sylvain-d'Anjou (8)
24.	FC Val de Moine (11)	2–2 (4–3 p)	AS Bruffière Defontaine (10)
25.	Olympique Sal-Tour Vézins Coron (11)	2–1	FF Mortagne-sur-Sèvre (10)
26.	SomloirYzernay CPF (9)	0–1	FC Saint-Laurent Malvent (9)
27.	US Bernardière-Cugand (10)	0–0 (3–4 p)	FC Fief Gesté (10)
28.	CA Vouvantais/US Glainoise (11)	0–3	JS Laval Maghreb (8)
29.	FC Île de Noirmoutier (10)	1–4	Alliance Sud-Retz Machecoul (9)
30.	Saint MathMénitRé FC (11)	2–1	AS Bayard-Saumur (8)
31.	USJA Saint-Martin-Aviré-Louvaine (11)	2–0	US Forcé (9)
32.	Athletic Laigné-Loigné (8)	2–3	SC Angevin (9)
33.	USSA Montréverd (11)	0–1	ES Vallet (10)
34.	AS Sud Loire (10)	0–0 (3–5 p)	Saint-Gilles-Saint-Hilaire FC (11)
35.	USM Beauvoir-sur-Mer (11)	2–2 (4–5 p)	Étoile Mouzillon Foot (10)
36.	AS Montmirail-Melleray (11)	0–9	Gazélec Le Mans (8)
37.	ES Montfort-le-Gesnois (11)	0–7	US La Chapelle-Saint-Rémy (8)
38.	US La Chapelle-d'Aligné (10)	1–2	CS Lion d'Angers (8)
39.	AS Congrier (10)	1–16	FC Guémené-Massérac (9)
40.	ES Rougé (12)	0–9	FC Craonnais (8)
41.	ARC Tillières (11)	0–3	FC Mouchamps-Rochetrejoux (9)
42.	BoupèreMonProuant FC (9)	0–1	Saint-Georges Trémentines FC (9)
43.	Gaubretière-Saint-Martin FC (11)	2–5	AS Longeron-Torfou (9)
44.	FC Villedieu-La Renaudière (12)	1–2	Val de Sèvre Football (10)
45.	FC Gétigné-Boussay (10)	2–0	Écureils des Pays de Monts (9)
46.	ES des Marais (9)	3–6 (Note: Tie reversed from original draw.)	AFC Bouin-Bois-de-Céné-Châteauneuf (11)
47.	AL Châteaubriant (9)	1–1 (7–8 p)	Hermine Saint-Ouennaise(8)
48.	Legé FC (11)	2–3	Espoir du Marais Sallertaine (9)
49.	Olympique Bécon-Villemoisan-Saint-Augustin (9)	3–2	Andrezé-Jub-Jallais FC (8)
50.	ES Gennes-Les Rosiers (11)	0–4	AS Val-d'Erdre-Auxence (10)
51.	Saint-Barthélémy-d'Anjou Foot (9)	0–0 (6–5 p)	AS Saint-Hilaire-Vihiers-Saint-Paul (8)
52.	UF Allonnes-Brain-sur-Allonnes (9)	1–1 (4–5 p)	Croix Blanche Angers (8)
53.	Christophe-Séguinière (8)	2–5	FE Trélazé (8)
54.	Est Anjou FC (11)	1–1 (4–3 p)	ES Andard-Brain (9)
55.	AS Lac de Maine (9)	2–0	US Beaufort-en-Vallée (8)
56.	ES Puy-Vaudelnay (11)	0–0 (3–4 p)	AS Avrillé (9)
57.	AS Vivy-Neuillé 90 (11)	4–1	Doutre SC (11)
58.	AC Aigné (11)	1–6	Internationale du Mans (8)
59.	SC Luceau (11)	0–5	US Guécélard (8)
60.	Petit-Mars FC (10)	2–3	FC Fuilet-Chaussaire (9)
61.	Pomjeannais JA (8)	1–2	JA Saint-Mars-du-Désert (9)
62.	US Marans-Gené (12)	2–5	AS Ballée (10)
63.	FC Bout' Loire-et-Evre (10)	2–1	AS Mésanger (10)
64.	Herblanetz FC (12)	1–5	Sainte Christine-Bourgneuf FC (11)
65.	Loire Foot Alliance (10)	0–5	Le Cellier-Mauves FC (9)
66.	Herbadilla Foot (10)	1–3	FC Saligny (9)
67.	FC Bourgneuf-en-Retz (11)	0–6	US Bequots-Lucquois (9)
68.	ES du Lac (11)	1–4	FC Chavagnes-La Rabatelière (9)
69.	Océane FC (10)	0–1	FC Bouaine Rocheservière (9)
70.	ÉS Connerré (10)	2–2 (5–4 p)	Football Champagné Sport (10)
71.	US Breilloise (11)	1–1 (3–4 p)	US Bouloire (9)
72.	FC Dollon-Thorigné (11)	0–5	SA Mamertins (8)
73.	AS Saint-Jean-d'Assé (9)	2–2 (4–5 p)	AS Meslay-du-Maine (9)
74.	US Aronnaise (9)	1–6	Beaumont SA (8)
75.	Ambrières Cigné Football (8)	5–1	CA Loué (9)
76.	ASL L'Huisserie Foot (9)	2–1	SC Sainte-Gemmes-d'Andigné (9)
77.	AS Chemazé (10)	1–1 (5–6 p)	AS Chazé-Vern (11)
78.	FC Mayotte Le Mans (11)	1–1 (3–4 p)	AS Neuville-sur-Sarthe (10)
79.	Sainte-Jamme Sportive (11)	1–13	FC La Bazoge (9)
80.	US Chantenay-Villedieu (11)	0–2	ASPTT Le Mans (9)
81.	SC Tuffé (11)	4–5	JS Parigné-l'Évêque (9)
82.	Hirondelles Soullandaises (10)	0–5	FC Bouaye (8)
83.	Saint-Michel SF (10)	4–0	AS Maine (8)
84.	FC Garnachois (10)	1–3	Saint Pierre de Retz (8)
85.	Nozay OS (9)	4–0	USA Pouancé (8)
86.	FC Logne et Boulogne (11)	1–5	FC Falleron-Froidfond (10)
87.	Étoile de Vie Le Fenouiller (10)	3–0	Bernerie OCA (11)
88.	CS Montoirin (10)	4–1	FC Presqu'île Vilaine (11)
89.	AS Sion-Lusanger (13)	1–3	AS Guillaumois (11)
90.	ES Haute Goulaine (10)	1–2	ES Vertou (9)
91.	FC Laurentais Landemontais (10)	4–0	FC Louet-Juignéen (11)
92.	JS Layon (11)	2–2 (4–1 p)	FC Saint-Lambert Saint-Jean Saint-Léger Saint-Martin (11)
93.	AS Valanjou (11)	6–4	FC Mesnilaurentais (11)
94.	AS Nord Est Anjou (11)	2–3	ES Layon (10)
95.	FC Layon (10)	1–0	ASVR Ambillou-Château (10)
96.	AC Belle Beille Angers (12)	0–4	AC Longué (10)
97.	CO Laigné-Saint-Gervais (10)	1–1 (5–3 p)	JS Allonnes (9)
98.	AS Cérans-Foulletourte (10)	3–0	La Vigilante Mayet (9)
99.	US Tennie-Saint-Symphorien (11)	1–4	AS La Chapelle-Saint-Aubin (9)
100.	AS Fyé (11)	0–7	FC Saint-Georges-Pruillé (9)
101.	AS Le Bailleul Crosmières (10)	1–8 (Note: US Arnage Pontlieue penalised for fielding a suspended player, AS Le Bailleul Crosmières qualify.)	US Arnage Pontlieue (9)
102.	FC Saint-Corneille (10)	1–2	EG Rouillon (8)
103.	Entente Givrand-L'Aiguillon-Landevieille FC (10)	2–0	FC Sud Sèvre et Maine (10)
104.	Étoile de Clisson (9)	1–0	AS Boufféré (8)
105.	FC Entente du Vignoble (9)	1–2	FO Cope Chauché (8)
106.	US Mazé (11)	2–3	ÉS Trélazé (11)
107.	UA Montreuil-Bellay (11)	2–2 (4–3 p)	ASR Vernantes-Vernoil (10)
108.	AS Ponts-de-Cé (11)	1–1 (3–1 p)	CAS Possosavennières (9)
109.	Maybéléger FC (10)	1–1 (1–3 p)	Saint-Melaine OS (9)
110.	Aubry Chaudron FC (10)	1–0	US Toutlemonde Maulévrier (9)
111.	US Saint-Georges-sur-Loire (11)	0–2	RC Doué-la-Fontaine (9)
112.	FC Sud Ouest Mayennais (10)	3–5	SO Candé Challan Loiré (11)
113.	AS La Chapelle-Craonnaise (11)	0–4	CF Châtelais-Nyoiseau-Bouillé-Grugé (11)
114.	CA Voutré (10)	4–0	Laval Outremer (11)
115.	Olympique Saint-Cyrien (11)	0–7	US Saint-Pierre Port-Brillet (9)
116.	US Saint-Jean-sur-Mayenne (10)	3–1	FC de l'Aisne (9)
117.	US Villiers-Charlemagne (10)	1–4	AS Andouillé (9)
118.	US Argentré (10)	0–4	FC Landivy-Pontmain (9)
119.	Gorron FC (10)	0–7	US Entrammes (8)
120.	US Pré-en-Pail (9)	2–9	CS Saint-Pierre-des-Landes (10)
121.	US Désertines (11)	1–5	Alerte Ahuillé FC (10)
122.	Larchamp-Montaudin FC (10)	0–1	FA Laval (10)
123.	FC La Montagne (10)	0–2	Nantes La Mellinet (8)
124.	RAC Cheminots Nantes (11)	1–7	FC Oudon-Couffé (10)
125.	Les Côteaux de la Roche (12)	1–4	FC Vallons le Pin (10)
126.	AS Ruffigné (12)	1–1 (0–3 p)	US Soudan (11)
127.	US Villepot (12)	1–2	US Aubinoise (11)
128.	FC Vay Marsac (11)	1–1 (5–3 p)	Sympho Foot Treillières (9)
129.	US Précigné (10)	0–1	Union Le Mans Sud (10)
130.	US Coulans-La Quinte (11)	4–0	US Villaines-Malicorne (10)
131.	US Challes-Grand Lucé (10)	3–3 (1–4 p)	AS Ruaudin (9)
132.	AS Sargéenne (10)	0–2	US Glonnières (9)
133.	CS Cheminots du Mans (10)	1–1 (8–7 p)	Lombron Sports (9)
134.	FC Ruillé-Loiron (10)	1–6	AS Parné (9)
135.	ES Quelainaise (10)	1–0 (Note: ES Quelainaise penalised for fielding a suspended player, AS Le Bourgneuf-la-Forêt qualify.)	AS Le Bourgneuf-la-Forêt (8)
136.	US Le Genest (10)	4–1	Voltigeurs Saint-Georges-Buttavent (9)
137.	AS Oisseau (10)	1–6	AS Martigné-sur-Mayenne (8)
138.	Moulay Sports (10)	0–0 (3–2 p)	FC Astillé-Cosmes (10)
139.	FC Montjean (11)	1–1 (3–4 p)	Placé FC (10)
140.	US La Bigottière-Alexain (11)	0–3	USB Juvigné (10)
141.	AJS Frambaldéenne (10)	0–4	US Pays de Juhel (8)
142.	US La Bazoge-Montpinçon-Belgeard (10)	1–3	US Chantrigné (9)
143.	Brecé Sports (11)	0–4	EB Commer (10)
144.	Temple Cordemais FC (11)	2–2 (2–4 p)	Sainte-Reine-Crossac Football (9)
145.	ES Maritime (10)	0–9	AS La Madeleine (8)
146.	Étoile du Don Moisdon-Meilleraye (11)	0–3	FC Fay Bouvron (9)
147.	Savenay-Malville-Prinquiau FC (9)	0–2	La Saint-André (8)
148.	Saint-Joseph de Porterie Nantes (10)	0–3	Donges FC (9)
149.	FC Le Gavre Le Chevallerais (10)	1–2	JGE Sucé-sur-Erdre (9)
150.	FC Côte Sauvage (11)	1–3	US Saint-Molf (10)
151.	Coëx Olympique (10)	1–2	FC Achards (8)
152.	ES La Romagne-Roussay (11)	3–2	Sèvremont FC (8)
153.	Loups Sportifs Sainte-Flaive-des-Loups (10)	0–3	US Saint-Michel Triaize La Tranche Angles (9)
154.	ES Longevillaise (11)	2–3	ES Rives de l'Yon (9)
155.	ES Grosbreuil-Girouard (10)	0–3	FC La Génétouze (9)
156.	Commequiers SF (11)	3–5	FC Talmondais (9)
157.	Amicale Saint-Lyphard (10)	3–0	SC Avessac-Fégréac (9)
158.	JF Boissière-des-Landes (11)	0–0 (4–3 p)	FC Cantonal Sud Vendée (9)
159.	Foot Espoir 85 (10)	4–0	US Aubigny (8)
160.	US Autize Vendée (11)	0–5	Entente Sud Vendée (10)
161.	SO Fougeré-Thorigny (12)	0–4	RS Les Clouzeaux (11)
162.	La Chaize FEC (9)	2–1	LSG Les Brouzils (8)
163.	FC Mouilleron-Thouarsais-Caillère (9)	0–1	FC Plaine et Bocage (8)
164.	US Herminoise (10)	0–4	Sud Vendée Football (8)
165.	AS Quatre Vents Fontaines (10)	2–1	Pays de Chantonnay Foot (8)
166.	US Vouvant Bourneau Cezais (12)	0–18	FC Cécilien Martinoyen (8)
167.	US Mesnard-Vendrennes (11)	0–3	Saint-Martin Treize Septiers (9)
168.	FC Nieul-Maillezais-Les Autises (10)	0–4	Entente Cheffois-Antigny-Saint-Maurice (8)
169.	Arche FC (9)	0–1	FC Retz (8)
170.	Don Bosco Football Nantes (9)	1–1 (3–4 p)	AEPR Rezé (8)
171.	FC Toutes Aides Nantes (11)	2–2 (4–3 p)	Eclair de Chauvé (10)
172.	Étoile du Cens Nantes (11)	4–0	UFC Erdre et Donneau (10)
173.	Réveil Saint-Géréon (10)	3–2	Saint-Vincent LUSTVI (10)
174.	AS Saint-Maixent-sur-Vie (11)	0–1	AF Apremont-La Chapelle (10)
175.	AS Dom-Tom (11)	1–2	US Bournezeau-Saint-Hilaire (9)
176.	FC Saint-Julien-Vairé (11)	0–4	Jard-Avrillé-Moutiers-Saint-Avaugourd FC (8)
177.	FC Atlantique Morbihan (11)	5–2	FC Immaculée (10)
178.	FC Estuaire (12)	4–2	Métallo Sport Chantenaysien (10)
179.	CCS Nantes Saint-Félix (12)	1–9	Orvault RC (10)
180.	Petit-Auverné Sports (12)	0–3 (Note: Tie won by means of forfeit.)	ES Belligné-Chapelle-Maumusson (11)
181.	Union Brivet Campbon Chapelle-Launay (9)	2–4	Saint-Aubin-Guérande Football (8)
182.	ÉS Jovéenne (11)	2–1	Nantes Saint-Pierre (10)
183.	Abbaretz-Saffré FC (9)	1–0	US Thouaré (8)
184.	FC Boboto (11)	2–2 (7–8 p)	Bouguenais Football (10)
185.	Les Touches FC (11)	0–2	Nantes Sud 98 (9)
186.	Missilac FC (12)	1–2	FC Trois Rivières (10)
187.	AS Sigournais-Saint Germain (11)	1–0	FC Tiffauges Les Landes (10)
188.	FC Pays de Palluau (11)	5–4	FC Généraudière Roche Sud (9)
189.	Saint-Pierre Sportif Nieul-le-Dolent (10)	1–0	ES Saint-Denis-la-Chevasse (9)
190.	US Alverne (11)	3–3 (4–2 p)	AS Grandchamp Foot (11)
191.	La Guinéenne de l'Association de Loire Atlantique (11)	5–0 (Note: La Guinéenne de l'Association de Loire Atlantique peanlised for fileding a suspended player, FC Basse Loire qualify.)	FC Basse Loire (10)
192.	US Bugallière Orvault (11)	0–3	FC Mouzeil-Teillé-Ligné (8)
193.	Héric FC (10)	0–5	Landreau-Loroux OSC (8)
194.	Saint-Cyr Foot Herbignac (10)	0–1	ES Pornichet (8)
195.	Saint-Herblain OC (9)	4–3	Couëron Chabossière FC (8)
196.	Goelands Sammaritains (12)	1–1 (4–2 p)	Saint-Médard Football (11)
197.	FC Stephanois (11)	1–0	FC Brière (10)
198.	Espérance Saint-Yves Nantes (10)	1–6	Saint-Marc Football (8)
199.	FC Saint-Philbert-Réorthe-Jaudonnière (11)	5–1	US Bazoges Beaurepaire (10)
200.	Sainte-Foy FC (10)	2–5	FC Robretières La Roche-sur-Yon (9)
201.	Les Farfadets Saint-Paul-en-Pareds (10)	1–1 (5–3 p)	ES Belleville-sur-Vie (10)
202.	FC Meilleraie-Montournais-Menomblet (10)	6–0	Saint-Georges Guyonnière FC (10)
203.	SSJA Saint-Mathurin (11)	1–3	JA Nesmy (10)
204.	FC Vallée du Graon (11)	2–4	US Gouledoisienne (10)
205.	ES Pineaux (11)	1–5	US Landeronde-Saint-Georges (11)
206.	US La Ferrière Dompierre (10)	2–0	Hermitage Venansault (10)
207.	RS Ardelay (9)	5–0	US Les Epesses-Saint-Mars (10)

=== Second round ===
These matches were played on 1 September 2024.

Second Round Results: Pays de la Loire
Tie no	Home team (Tier)	Score	Away team (Tier)
1.	ASPTT Le Mans (9)	1–3	AS Mulsanne-Teloché (7)
2.	AS Neuville-sur-Sarthe (10)	0–5	US Nautique Spay (7)
3.	SC Trangé-Chaufour-Degré (10)	2–2 (3–5 p)	ES Yvré-l'Évêque (8)
4.	CO Laigné-Saint-Gervais (10)	1–3	VS Fertois (8)
5.	US Coulans-La Quinte (11)	0–2	EG Rouillon (8)
6.	ÉS Connerré (10)	0–7	Beaumont SA (8)
7.	JS Parigné-l'Évêque (9)	1–6	CS Changé (8)
8.	FC Villevêque-Soucelles (10)	4–4 (4–5 p)	CO Castélorien (8)
9.	Ajax Daumeray Football (10)	0–2	ES Morannes (10)
10.	SS Noyen-sur-Sarthe (9)	1–1 (4–2 p)	EA Baugeois (7)
11.	US Briollay (11)	2–5	AS Clermont-Créans (8)
12.	Saint Pierre de Retz (8)	5–0	Espoir du Marais Sallertaine (9)
13.	FC Retz (8)	2–1	FC Bouaine Rocheservière (9)
14.	AS Meslay-du-Maine (9)	0–3	Auvers Poillé Brulon FC (7)
15.	US Alpes Mancelles (10)	0–6	Stade Mayennais FC (7)
16.	CS Lion d'Angers (8)	1–2	La Suze Roëzé FC (7)
17.	Saint-Melaine OS (9)	0–1	US Méral-Cossé (7)
18.	AS Cérans-Foulletourte (10)	0–3	AS Saint-Sylvain-d'Anjou (8)
19.	Olympique Bécon-Villemoisan-Saint-Augustin (9)	1–2	ASI Mûrs-Erigné (7)
20.	FC Pays de Palluau (11)	2–5	Alliance Sud-Retz Machecoul (9)
21.	Étoile Mouzillon Foot (10)	1–5	FC Essartais (8)
22.	ES Vallet (10)	1–5	Montaigu Vendée Football (7)
23.	US Glonnières (9)	0–7	CA Évronnais (8)
24.	FC La Bazoge (9)	1–1 (8–7 p)	AS Contest-Saint Baudelle (8)
25.	FC Fief Gesté (10)	2–1	RS Ardelay (9)
26.	AS Longeron-Torfou (9)	5–0	FC Meilleraie-Montournais-Menomblet (10)
27.	FC Saint-Laurent Malvent (9)	2–1	Olympique Liré-Drain (7)
28.	Saint-Martin Treize Septiers (9)	1–1 (4–2 p)	Olympique Chemillé-Melay (7)
29.	Étoile de Clisson (9)	3–1	Entente Givrand-L'Aiguillon-Landevieille FC (10)
30.	US La Ferrière Dompierre (10)	1–1 (0–3 p)	AS Vieillevigne-La Planche (8)
31.	ES Vertou (9)	3–3 (1–3 p)	Saint-Michel SF (10)
32.	Étoile de Vie Le Fenouiller (10)	0–0 (4–3 p)	FC Côteaux du Vignoble (8)
33.	FC Chavagnes-La Rabatelière (9)	1–1 (4–2 p)	FC Bouaye (8)
34.	Union Le Mans Sud (10)	1–3	SA Mamertins (8)
35.	US Saint-Mars-la-Brière (10)	0–0 (5–3 p)	FC Saint-Saturnin-La Milesse (7)
36.	US Vibraysienne (9)	2–4	AS Étival (10)
37.	CS Cheminots du Mans (10)	0–9	ES Moncé (8)
38.	Écommoy FC (8)	1–2	FC Pellouailles-Corze (7)
39.	US Soudan (11)	0–7	Hermine Saint-Ouennaise(8)
40.	JS Laval Maghreb (8)	6–2	Montreuil-Juigné Béné Football (7)
41.	SO Candé Challan Loiré (11)	0–7	FC Château-Gontier (8)
42.	FC Saint-Georges-Pruillé (9)	1–1 (9–8 p)	US Guécélard (8)
43.	AS Ruaudin (9)	1–1 (5–4 p)	US La Chapelle-Saint-Rémy (8)
44.	US Bouloire (9)	1–10	Gazélec Le Mans (8)
45.	AS Avrillé (9)	0–2	US Saint-Berthevin (8)
46.	US Gouledoisienne (10)	1–2	Olympique Sal-Tour Vézins Coron (11)
47.	SC Nord Atlantique (8)	0–1	ES Segré (7)
48.	FC Fuilet-Chaussaire (9)	4–0	Réveil Saint-Géréon (10)
49.	AS Tiercé-Cheffes (8)	1–3	La Flèche RC (7)
50.	FC Longuenée-en-Anjou (9)	1–1 (4–3 p)	RC Ancenis 44 (7)
51.	AS Val-d'Erdre-Auxence (10)	2–1	US Combrée-Bel-Air-Noyant (9)
52.	ES Bouchemaine (8)	2–3	ES Aubance (7)
53.	Est Anjou FC (11)	4–5	Angers Vaillante Foot (8)
54.	RC Doué-la-Fontaine (9)	4–1	Intrépide Angers Foot (8)
55.	AC Longué (10)	5–1	AS Ponts-de-Cé (11)
56.	ES Layon (10)	4–1	AS Vivy-Neuillé 90 (11)
57.	US Laval (8)	1–2	NDC Angers (7)
58.	AS Ballée (10)	1–2	AS Saint-Pierre d'Angrie (10)
59.	Saint MathMénitRé FC (11)	0–2 (Note: Saint-Barthélémy-d'Anjou Foot penalised for a rules infraction, exact reason unknown. Saint MathMénitRé FC qualify.)	Saint-Barthélémy-d'Anjou Foot (9)
60.	UA Montreuil-Bellay (11)	0–2	Croix Blanche Angers (8)
61.	Donges FC (9)	0–1	AS La Madeleine (8)
62.	US Aubinoise (11)	1–3	FC Craonnais (8)
63.	FC Fay Bouvron (9)	0–1	AOS Pontchâteau (8)
64.	ES Pornichet (8)	1–0	ES Vigneux (7)
65.	Sainte-Reine-Crossac Football (9)	0–2	La Saint-André (8)
66.	ES La Romagne-Roussay (11)	2–0	US Lucéene (8)
67.	FC Saint-Philbert-Réorthe-Jaudonnière (11)	4–3	FC Robretières La Roche-sur-Yon (9)
68.	AF Apremont-La Chapelle (10)	1–3	Jard-Avrillé-Moutiers-Saint-Avaugourd FC (8)
69.	FC Saligny (9)	1–5	Élan de Gorges Foot (7)
70.	US Bournezeau-Saint-Hilaire (9)	2–0	Elan Sorinières Football (7)
71.	FC La Génétouze (9)	0–1	FC Gétigné-Boussay (10)
72.	Entente Sud Vendée (10)	1–3	Luçon FC (8)
73.	Saint-Pierre Sportif Nieul-le-Dolent (10)	0–6	ES Marsouins Brétignolles-Brem (7)
74.	Val de Sèvre Football (10)	1–1 (3–4 p)	FC Layon (10)
75.	Saint-Georges Trémentines FC (9)	1–0	Les Farfadets Saint-Paul-en-Pareds (10)
76.	FO Cope Chauché (8)	1–6	AS Saint-Pierre-Montrevault (7)
77.	FC Talmondais (9)	2–1	La France d'Aizenay (7)
78.	FC Mouchamps-Rochetrejoux (9)	3–2	FC Beaupréau La Chapelle (7)
79.	Foot Espoir 85 (10)	1–2	Vigilante Saint Fulgent (8)
80.	La Chaize FEC (9)	2–1	JA Nesmy (10)
81.	Le Cellier-Mauves FC (9)	1–2	SO Cholet (8)
82.	CF Châtelais-Nyoiseau-Bouillé-Grugé (11)	0–1	ASL L'Huisserie Foot (9)
83.	Sainte Christine-Bourgneuf FC (11)	0–0 (7–8 p)	AS Lac de Maine (9)
84.	AS Chazé-Vern (11)	2–5	US Entrammes (8)
85.	ÉS Jovéenne (11)	2–3	JA Saint-Mars-du-Désert (9)
86.	FC Mouzeil-Teillé-Ligné (8)	1–2	Abbaretz-Saffré FC (9)
87.	FC Guémené-Massérac (9)	1–3	Nort ACF (7)
88.	FC Trois Rivières (10)	4–0	US Alverne (11)
89.	FC Atlantique Morbihan (11)	0–6	ES Dresny-Plessé (8)
90.	FC Stephanois (11)	3–6	Nantes Sud 98 (9)
91.	AS Guillaumois (11)	0–2	AC Chapelain Foot (7)
92.	US Bequots-Lucquois (9)	0–1	Entente Cheffois-Antigny-Saint-Maurice (8)
93.	US Landeronde-Saint-Georges (11)	0–3	FC Plaine et Bocage (8)
94.	FC Falleron-Froidfond (10)	2–2 (3–2 p)	FC Achards (8)
95.	JF Boissière-des-Landes (11)	1–3	ES Rives de l'Yon (9)
96.	AS Quatre Vents Fontaines (10)	3–5	FC Cécilien Martinoyen (8)
97.	RS Les Clouzeaux (11)	0–9	Mouilleron SF (7)
98.	Saint-Gilles-Saint-Hilaire FC (11)	0–0 (6–5 p)	US Saint-Michel Triaize La Tranche Angles (9)
99.	ÉS Trélazé (11)	3–2	Aubry Chaudron FC (10)
100.	JS Layon (11)	1–2	FC Bout' Loire-et-Evre (10)
101.	AS Valanjou (11)	1–1 (3–5 p)	FC Laurentais Landemontais (10)
102.	SC Angevin (9)	2–2 (4–3 p)	Football Chalonnes-Chaudefonds (7)
103.	FE Trélazé (8)	0–2	Saint-André-Saint-Macaire FC (7)
104.	AS Seiches-sur-le-Loire-Marcé (8)	3–1	ES Montilliers (7)
105.	FC Val de Moine (11)	0–4	US Puy-Maz-Tess (8)
106.	US Saint-Jean-sur-Mayenne (10)	1–2	USC Pays de Montsurs (8)
107.	Moulay Sports (10)	0–9	Ambrières Cigné Football (8)
108.	Alerte Ahuillé FC (10)	0–2	Louverné Sports (8)
109.	FC Lassay-Le Horps (8)	1–4	Ernéenne Foot (7)
110.	Placé FC (10)	0–4	US Saint-Pierre Port-Brillet (9)
111.	US Chantrigné (9)	1–3	AS Martigné-sur-Mayenne (8)
112.	FC Landivy-Pontmain (9)	1–2	US Le Genest (10)
113.	EB Commer (10)	1–3	AS Parné (9)
114.	US Pays de Juhel (8)	0–1	AS Bourny Laval (8)
115.	AS Andouillé (9)	5–1	CA Voutré (10)
116.	CS Saint-Pierre-des-Landes (10)	1–2	USB Juvigné (10)
117.	FA Laval (10)	0–7	Jeunes d'Erbray (8)
118.	FC Toutes Aides Nantes (11)	0–2	UF Saint-Herblain (8)
119.	AEPR Rezé (8)	0–2	Saint-Herblain OC (9)
120.	Amicale Saint-Lyphard (10)	0–5	FC La Chapelle-des-Marais (7)
121.	ASC Saint-Médard-de-Doulon Nantes (8)	1–1 (3–1 p)	AC Saint-Brevin (7)
122.	Pornic Foot (7)	8–1 (Note: Tie reversed from original draw.)	AFC Bouin-Bois-de-Céné-Châteauneuf (11)
123.	Orvault RC (10)	2–1	FC Estuaire (12)
124.	JGE Sucé-sur-Erdre (9)	3–0	FC Vay Marsac (11)
125.	ES Belligné-Chapelle-Maumusson (11)	0–3	US Varades (8)
126.	FC Vallons le Pin (10)	1–4	ES Blain (7)
127.	Nozay OS (9)	1–1 (3–4 p)	USJA Carquefou (7)
128.	US Saint-Molf (10)	0–5	Saint-Marc Football (8)
129.	Landreau-Loroux OSC (8)	1–0	AC Basse-Goulaine (7)
130.	Goelands Sammaritains (12)	2–2 (4–5 p)	Étoile du Cens Nantes (11)
131.	CS Montoirin (10)	0–11	Saint-Aubin-Guérande Football (8)
132.	FC Oudon-Couffé (10)	0–0 (3–4 p)	Nantes La Mellinet (8)
133.	Bouguenais Football (10)	1–5	FC Grand Lieu (8)
134.	AS Sigournais-Saint Germain (11)	2–2 (5–4 p)	Sud Vendée Football (8)
135.	AS La Chapelle-Saint-Aubin (9)	2–3	Internationale du Mans (8)
136.	USJA Saint-Martin-Aviré-Louvaine (11)	2–1	AS Le Bourgneuf-la-Forêt (8)
137.	FC Basse Loire (10)	3–1	FC Rezé (7)
138.	AS Le Bailleul Crosmières (10)	1–4	La Patriote Bonnétable (8)

=== Third round ===
These matches were played on 14 and 15 September 2024.

Third Round Results: Pays de la Loire
Tie no	Home team (Tier)	Score	Away team (Tier)
1.	Luçon FC (8)	0–1	ASI Mûrs-Erigné (7)
2.	USJA Carquefou (7)	1–1 (5–4 p)	SC Beaucouzé (6)
3.	Saint-Gilles-Saint-Hilaire FC (11)	0–8	ESOF La Roche-sur-Yon (5)
4.	AS Étival (10)	1–2	FC Pellouailles-Corze (7)
5.	AS Sigournais-Saint Germain (11)	1–5	FC Cécilien Martinoyen (8)
6.	FC Saint-Laurent Malvent (9)	1–3	FC Fuilet-Chaussaire (9)
7.	Ambrières Cigné Football (8)	5–1	FC La Bazoge (9)
8.	Montaigu Vendée Football (7)	1–1 (8–7 p)	FC Challans (5)
9.	AC Longué (10)	0–0 (4–2 p)	Internationale du Mans (8)
10.	ES Layon (10)	2–2 (5–6 p)	RC Cholet (6)
11.	ES Blain (7)	1–2	FC Saint-Julien Divatte (6)
12.	FC Talmondais (9)	4–0	AC Chapelain Foot (7)
13.	Saint-Herblain OC (9)	0–4	AS La Madeleine (8)
14.	EG Rouillon (8)	0–1	Louverné Sports (8)
15.	Étoile de Vie Le Fenouiller (10)	2–3	UF Saint-Herblain (8)
16.	AS Andouillé (9)	0–3	Sablé FC (5)
17.	La Suze Roëzé FC (7)	3–0	AS Saint-Sylvain-d'Anjou (8)
18.	FC Falleron-Froidfond (10)	0–2	AS Saint-Pierre-Montrevault (7)
19.	FC Layon (10)	0–0 (4–3 p)	Angers Vaillante Foot (8)
20.	Vigilante Saint Fulgent (8)	1–3	US Bournezeau-Saint-Hilaire (9)
21.	ÉS Trélazé (11)	0–0 (3–4 p)	Étoile de Clisson (9)
22.	AOS Pontchâteau (8)	1–2	AS Lac de Maine (9)
23.	US Saint-Pierre Port-Brillet (9)	1–1 (7–6 p)	Ancienne Château-Gontier (6)
24.	FC Bout' Loire-et-Evre (10)	1–1 (7–6 p)	ES Pornichet (8)
25.	CO Castélorien (8)	0–2	Beaumont SA (8)
26.	Hermine Saint-Ouennaise (8)	1–1 (3–5 p)	SS Noyen-sur-Sarthe (9)
27.	AS Martigné-sur-Mayenne (8)	0–5	JS Coulaines (6)
28.	La Flèche RC (7)	4–1	Landreau-Loroux OSC (8)
29.	Nort ACF (7)	2–5	Saint-Nazaire AF (6)
30.	Saint-Michel SF (10)	0–3	La Saint-André (8)
31.	ASL L'Huisserie Foot (9)	0–6	Saint-Sébastien FC (6)
32.	ES Rives de l'Yon (9)	0–2	US Philbertine Football (5)
33.	AS Saint-Pierre d'Angrie (10)	1–4	Auvers Poillé Brulon FC (7)
34.	US Varades (8)	1–5	Mareuil SC (6)
35.	ES Morannes (10)	1–1 (7–6 p)	USJA Saint-Martin-Aviré-Louvaine (11)
36.	VS Fertois (8)	1–5	US Changé (6)
37.	Alliance Sud-Retz Machecoul (9)	1–0	Pornic Foot (7)
38.	ES Dresny-Plessé (8)	3–1	AS Longeron-Torfou (9)
39.	US Saint-Berthevin (8)	0–0 (5–3 p)	CA Évronnais (8)
40.	Gazélec Le Mans (8)	2–0	Croix Blanche Angers (8)
41.	FC Essartais (8)	2–2 (7–6 p)	NDC Angers (7)
42.	FC Saint-Philbert-Réorthe-Jaudonnière (11)	0–0 (4–1 p)	FC Chavagnes-La Rabatelière (9)
43.	JGE Sucé-sur-Erdre (9)	2–1	US Méral-Cossé (7)
44.	FC Longuenée-en-Anjou (9)	0–3	Pouzauges Bocage FC (6)
45.	FC La Chapelle-des-Marais (7)	1–6	FC Olonne Château (6)
46.	USB Juvigné (10)	0–5	SA Mamertins (8)
47.	FC Mouchamps-Rochetrejoux (9)	3–0	AS Val-d'Erdre-Auxence (10)
48.	FC Gétigné-Boussay (10)	0–2	FC Basse Loire (10)
49.	Saint-André-Saint-Macaire FC (7)	4–1	AS Seiches-sur-le-Loire-Marcé (8)
50.	Saint-Aubin-Guérande Football (8)	2–0	Saint Pierre de Retz (8)
51.	Étoile du Cens Nantes (11)	1–5	Entente Cheffois-Antigny-Saint-Maurice (8)
52.	Stade Mayennais FC (7)	3–3 (4–2 p)	JS Laval Maghreb (8)
53.	USC Pays de Montsurs (8)	2–2 (4–2 p)	AS Mulsanne-Teloché (7)
54.	Nantes Sud 98 (9)	1–2	ASC Saint-Médard-de-Doulon Nantes (8)
55.	AS Parné (9)	0–2	La Patriote Bonnétable (8)
56.	ES Bonchamp (6)	0–0 (2–4 p)	USSA Vertou (5)
57.	Orvault RC (10)	0–2	AS La Châtaigneraie (5)
58.	FC Laurentais Landemontais (10)	2–0	FC Château-Gontier (8)
59.	Saint-Marc Football (8)	3–1	JA Saint-Mars-du-Désert (9)
60.	US Puy-Maz-Tess (8)	2–4	ES Aubance (7)
61.	AS Bourny Laval (8)	1–3	CS Changé (8)
62.	FC Plaine et Bocage (8)	1–0	La Chaize FEC (9)
63.	ES Yvré-l'Évêque (8)	3–1	AS Ruaudin (9)
64.	Mouilleron SF (7)	3–1	AS Vieillevigne-La Planche (8)
65.	Nantes La Mellinet (8)	1–1 (3–4 p)	US La Baule-Le Pouliguen (6)
66.	Saint MathMénitRé FC (11)	0–2	JSC Bellevue Nantes (6)
67.	Olympique Sal-Tour Vézins Coron (11)	1–4	Saint-Georges Trémentines FC (9)
68.	US Le Genest (10)	1–4	Ernéenne Foot (7)
69.	FC Fief Gesté (10)	3–1	AS Clermont-Créans (8)
70.	SC Angevin (9)	2–6	Orvault SF (6)
71.	ES Marsouins Brétignolles-Brem (7)	1–1 (4–5 p)	Élan de Gorges Foot (7)
72.	FC Trois Rivières (10)	0–3	Vendée Fontenay Foot (5)
73.	Jeunes d'Erbray (8)	4–2	RC Doué-la-Fontaine (9)
74.	US Saint-Mars-la-Brière (10)	1–3	ES Moncé (8)
75.	Abbaretz-Saffré FC (9)	2–1	AS Sautron (6)
76.	Jard-Avrillé-Moutiers-Saint-Avaugourd FC (8)	6–2	Saint-Martin Treize Septiers (9)
77.	SO Cholet (8)	5–0	FC Retz (8)
78.	US Nautique Spay (7)	4–2	FC Craonnais (8)
79.	US Entrammes (8)	3–2	AS Le Mans Villaret (6)
80.	ES La Romagne-Roussay (11)	1–3	FC Grand Lieu (8)
81.	FC Saint-Georges-Pruillé (9)	0–6	ES Segré (7)

=== Fourth round ===
These matches were played on 28 and 29 September 2024.

Fourth Round Results: Pays de la Loire
Tie no	Home team (Tier)	Score	Away team (Tier)
1.	Ernéenne Foot (7)	1–1 (3–4 p)	La Saint-André (8)
2.	Saint-Georges Trémentines FC (9)	0–2	La Roche VF (4)
3.	FC Talmondais (9)	1–2	FC Plaine et Bocage (8)
4.	Stade Mayennais FC (7)	0–6	Les Herbiers VF (4)
5.	US Philbertine Football (5)	7–1	RC Cholet (6)
6.	Entente Cheffois-Antigny-Saint-Maurice (8)	0–6	Olympique Saumur FC (4)
7.	ES Dresny-Plessé (8)	1–6	Voltigeurs de Châteaubriant (4)
8.	Étoile de Clisson (9)	1–6	FC Saint-Julien Divatte (6)
9.	USJA Carquefou (7)	1–1 (5–6 p)	Saint-André-Saint-Macaire FC (7)
10.	FC Basse Loire (10)	1–4	La Patriote Bonnétable (8)
11.	Beaumont SA (8)	1–0	AS Saint-Pierre-Montrevault (7)
12.	ES Segré (7)	3–1	Saint-Sébastien FC (6)
13.	SS Noyen-sur-Sarthe (9)	0–2	ESOF La Roche-sur-Yon (5)
14.	ES Morannes (10)	0–2	Saint-Nazaire AF (6)
15.	ASC Saint-Médard-de-Doulon Nantes (8)	0–0 (3–5 p)	La Flèche RC (7)
16.	UF Saint-Herblain (8)	2–2 (3–4 p)	Ambrières Cigné Football (8)
17.	US Entrammes (8)	1–2	USSA Vertou (5)
18.	ES Aubance (7)	3–2	Gazélec Le Mans (8)
19.	Louverné Sports (8)	4–1	AS Lac de Maine (9)
20.	FC Laurentais Landemontais (10)	0–2	FC Olonne Château (6)
21.	FC Bout' Loire-et-Evre (10)	1–4	USC Pays de Montsurs (8)
22.	Alliance Sud-Retz Machecoul (9)	1–1 (4–5 p)	SO Cholet (8)
23.	FC Mouchamps-Rochetrejoux (9)	3–3 (3–5 p)	Mareuil SC (6)
24.	AS La Châtaigneraie (5)	6–0	JS Coulaines (6)
25.	ASI Mûrs-Erigné (7)	2–1	JSC Bellevue Nantes (6)
26.	Jard-Avrillé-Moutiers-Saint-Avaugourd FC (8)	0–1	US Saint-Pierre Port-Brillet (9)
27.	US Bournezeau-Saint-Hilaire (9)	1–0	Saint-Marc Football (8)
28.	AC Longué (10)	0–7	Pouzauges Bocage FC (6)
29.	FC Fief Gesté (10)	3–1	US Saint-Berthevin (8)
30.	Élan de Gorges Foot (7)	1–1 (2–4 p)	La Suze Roëzé FC (7)
31.	CS Changé (8)	2–3	US La Baule-Le Pouliguen (6)
32.	Auvers Poillé Brulon FC (7)	0–5	Vendée Fontenay Foot (5)
33.	SA Mamertins (8)	0–0 (4–2 p)	Saint-Aubin-Guérande Football (8)
34.	FC Grand Lieu (8)	1–1 (3–4 p)	JGE Sucé-sur-Erdre (9)
35.	FC Layon (10)	0–3	FC Pellouailles-Corze (7)
36.	Mouilleron SF (7)	1–1 (3–4 p)	FC Essartais (8)
37.	FC Fuilet-Chaussaire (9)	3–3 (3–2 p)	Abbaretz-Saffré FC (9)
38.	AS La Madeleine (8)	2–4	Sablé FC (5)
39.	FC Cécilien Martinoyen (8)	2–0	Orvault SF (6)
40.	US Nautique Spay (7)	0–5	Vendée Poiré-sur-Vie Football (4)
41.	ES Moncé (8)	2–1	Montaigu Vendée Football (7)
42.	ES Yvré-l'Évêque (8)	0–2	US Changé (6)
43.	FC Saint-Philbert-Réorthe-Jaudonnière (11)	3–0	Jeunes d'Erbray (8)

=== Fifth round ===
These matches were played on 12 and 13 October 2024, with one rearranged for 20 October 2024.

Fifth Round Results: Pays de la Loire
Tie no	Home team (Tier)	Score	Away team (Tier)
1.	Ambrières Cigné Football (8)	0–5	Le Mans FC (3)
2.	FC Olonne Château (6)	2–3	La Roche VF (4)
3.	USSA Vertou (5)	1–1 (7–6 p)	Vendée Poiré-sur-Vie Football (4)
4.	ESOF La Roche-sur-Yon (5)	3–0	Pouzauges Bocage FC (6)
5.	La Suze Roëzé FC (7)	3–2	Louverné Sports (8)
6.	US Changé (6)	1–0	Voltigeurs de Châteaubriant (4)
7.	La Saint-André (8)	1–1 (5–3 p)	FC Plaine et Bocage (8)
8.	SO Cholet (8)	2–0	La Flèche RC (7)
9.	SA Mamertins (8)	0–5	FC Saint-Julien Divatte (6)
10.	USC Pays de Montsurs (8)	0–0 (2–4 p)	FC Fuilet-Chaussaire (9)
11.	ES Segré (7)	1–5	US Philbertine Football (5)
12.	FC Essartais (8)	0–3	Saint-André-Saint-Macaire FC (7)
13.	FC Saint-Philbert-Réorthe-Jaudonnière (11)	2–0	FC Cécilien Martinoyen (8)
14.	FC Fief Gesté (10)	1–0	Mareuil SC (6)
15.	ES Aubance (7)	0–1	Sablé FC (5)
16.	ES Moncé (8)	1–0	US Bournezeau-Saint-Hilaire (9)
17.	JGE Sucé-sur-Erdre (9)	0–2	US La Baule-Le Pouliguen (6)
18.	La Patriote Bonnétable (8)	1–3	Olympique Saumur FC (4)
19.	FC Pellouailles-Corze (7)	1–0	ASI Mûrs-Erigné (7)
20.	Saint-Nazaire AF (6)	0–2	Les Herbiers VF (4)
21.	US Saint-Pierre Port-Brillet (9)	2–4	Vendée Fontenay Foot (5)
22.	Beaumont SA (8)	2–2 (3–4 p) (Note: Match took place on 20 October 2024, after postponement due to death of an AS La Châtaigneraie player in the club's previous game.)	AS La Châtaigneraie (5)

=== Sixth round ===
These matches were played on 26 and 27 October 2024.

Sixth Round Results: Pays de la Loire
Tie no	Home team (Tier)	Score	Away team (Tier)
1.	FC Fuilet-Chaussaire (9)	1–4	Les Herbiers VF (4)
2.	US Changé (6)	2–4	Le Mans FC (3)
3.	La Suze Roëzé FC (7)	1–3	Olympique Saumur FC (4)
4.	US La Baule-Le Pouliguen (6)	0–3	La Roche VF (4)
5.	US Philbertine Football (5)	2–2 (7–6 p)	AS La Châtaigneraie (5)
6.	FC Saint-Julien Divatte (6)	1–4	ESOF La Roche-sur-Yon (5)
7.	ES Moncé (8)	0–6	Vendée Fontenay Foot (5)
8.	FC Pellouailles-Corze (7)	0–0 (3–4 p)	USSA Vertou (5)
9.	FC Fief Gesté (10)	0–0 (4–3 p)	La Saint-André (8)
10.	Saint-André-Saint-Macaire FC (7)	0–5	Sablé FC (5)
11.	FC Saint-Philbert-Réorthe-Jaudonnière (11)	0–0 (5–4 p)	SO Cholet (8)
