= AS La Châtaigneraie =

French football club

- Full name: Amicale Sportive Châtaigneraie; Vendée Football
- Founded: 1925
- Ground: Stade Claude Bétard, La Châtaigneraie
- Capacity: 1,000
- Chairman: Alain Brillouet
- Manager: Alain Ferrand
- League: National 3 Group D
- 2022–23: Régional 1 Pays de la Loire, Group B, 1st (promoted)
Home colours	Away colours

Amicale Sportive Châtaigneraie Vendée Football (French pronunciation: [amikal spɔrtiv ʃatɛɲ(ə)ʁɛ vɑ̃ˈde futbol]; commonly referred to as AS La Châtaigneraie, La Châtaigneraie, or simply La Chât) is a French football club based in La Châtaigneraie in the Pays de la Loire region. The club was founded on 8 April 1925 and currently plays in the Championnat National 3, the fifth tier of French football, following promotion in 2023.
