= Écommoy FC =

French football club

Ecommoy FC
Club founded in	1921
Colours	green and black
Stadium	Stade des vaugeons
Address	Place du Général de Gaulle BP 4, 72220 Écommoy
Website	ecommoy-fc.footeo.com

Ecommoy Football Club is a French football club based in Écommoy.
The club, managed by Jean-Noël Visonneau were promoted to the championnat DH in 2008-2009 from the Ligue du Maine.

== History ==
Founded in 1921 under the name of US Ecommoy, the club made its debut in the Division d'Honneur of the Ligue de football du Maine in 1986-1987. Becoming Ecommoy FC, the Green and Blacks took four titles as champion of the Maine leading to promotion to the national championships. These trips to a higher level were short: two seasons from 1994 to 1996, two seasons from 2001 to 2003, one season in 2005-2006 and the last in 2007-2008.

== Honours ==
- Champion of DH Maine : 1994, 2001, 2005, 2007
- Winner of the coupe du Maine : 1999, 2002, 2004, 2005
