= US Changé =

French football club

- Full name: Union Sportive Changéenne
- Founded: 1949
- Ground: Stade Municipal des Sablons, Changé
- Capacity: 3,500
- Co-presidents: Joël Ferron and Jean-Yves Lecoq
- Manager: Bertrand Girard
- League: Régional 1 Pays de la Loire
- 2022–23: National 3 Group B, 13th (relegated)
- Website: https://www.uschange-football.com/

Union Sportive Changéenne is a French association football club founded in 1949. They are based in the town of Changé, Mayenne and their home stadium is the Stade Municipal des Sablons, which has a capacity of 3,500 spectators. As of the 2023–24 season, they play in Régional 1, the sixth level of the French league system.

== History ==
The club was founded on 2 February 1949, with the first president being Jean Pigree. They initially played in the district league of Mayenne, gaining promotion to the Maine league system in 1994. In 2000 they gained promotion to Championnat de France Amateur 2 by winning the Maine Division d'Honneur. Since then the club has been promoted and relegated between CFA 2 and the DH a number of times.

In 2002 the club reached the 1/16th final of the Coupe de France, losing 3–0 against Stade de Reims.

In 2008 the club finished 4th in Group G of CFA 2, the best league finish in the club's history.
