= ES Bonchamp =

French football club

- Full name: Entente Sportive de Bonchamp Football
- Founded: 1964
- Ground: Stade Municipal, Bonchamp-lès-Laval
- Chairman: Daniel Ecobichon
- Manager: Hervé Blottière
- League: Championnat de France amateur 2
- 2009–10: 1st, DH (Maine)
Home colours

Entente Sportive de Bonchamp Football (French pronunciation: [ɑ̃.tɑ̃t spɔrtɪv də bɔ̃ʃɑmp]; commonly referred to as ES Bonchamp or simply Bonchamp) is a French football club based in Bonchamp-lès-Laval in the Pays de la Loire region. The club was founded in 1964 and is a part of a sports club that features over ten other sports. Bonchamp currently plays in the Championnat de France amateur 2, the fifth division of French football, after achieving promotion from the Division d'Honneur in the 2009–10 season.

Bonchamp reached the 1/32-finals of the 2009–10 Coupe de France, losing 2–0 to title-holders Guingamp.
