= USSA Vertou =

French football club

Vertou
- Full name: Union Sportive Sainte Anne Vertou
- Founded: 1944; 82 years ago
- Ground: Stade Vincent et Robert Girard, Vertou
- Chairman: Stéphane Dabet
- Manager: Alban Atonatty
- League: National 3 Group D
- 2022–23: National 3 Group B, 2nd
Home colours

Union Sportive Sainte Anne Vertou is a French association football team founded in 1944. They play at the Stade Vincent et Robert Girard in Vertou, Loire-Atlantique and they currently compete in the National 3.
