= ESOF La Roche-sur-Yon =

French football club

ESOF La Roche
- Full name: Étoile Sportive Ornaysienne de Football Vendée La Roche-sur-Yon
- Founded: 1938 (club) / 1945 (football)
- Ground: Stade de Saint-André-d'Ornay; La Roche-sur-Yon, France
- Capacity: 1,800
- Chairman: Laurent Grelier
- League: Régional 1
- 2024–25: National 3 Group B, 12th of 14 (relegated)
- Website: http://www.esofootball.net/
Home colours

Étoile Sportive Ornaysienne de Football Vendée La Roche-sur-Yon is a French football club from La Roche-sur-Yon, in the Vendée department of the Pays de la Loire. It is mainly known for its women's team.

It was founded on 5 October 1938 as a basketball club; the football section was created in 1945, and in 1950 it was registered in the FFF. The women's football team was created in 1978, and is the most successful department of the club. The men's team plays in Régional 1.
