= 2020–21 Coupe de France preliminary rounds =

2020–21 Coupe de France
Coupe Charles Simon

Tournament details
- Country: France

The 2020–21 Coupe de France preliminary rounds made up the qualifying competition to decide which teams took part in the main competition from round 7. This was the 104th season of the main football cup competition in France. The competition was organised by the French Football Federation (FFF) and was normally open to all clubs in French football, as well as clubs from the overseas departments and territories (Guadeloupe, French Guiana, Martinique, Mayotte, New Caledonia, Tahiti, Réunion, Saint Martin, and Saint Pierre and Miquelon). Due to the COVID-19 pandemic, clubs from Saint Pierre and Miquelon did not join the main competition, and clubs from New Caledonia and Tahiti did not participate. Changes to the competition structure due to the COVID-19 pandemic meant a total of 134 teams qualified for round 7 from this process this season, rather than the usual 156.

The six (or more, if required) Preliminary rounds were organised by the 13 Regional leagues from the mainland, and the 6 Regional leagues of the overseas departments and territories. They took place between February and October 2020.

The competition was paused on 28 October 2020, when France entered a second lockdown period due to the COVID-19 pandemic.

== Schedule ==
Other than the overseas leagues, and those regional leagues which choose to have the early rounds before the summer break, the general schedule for the Preliminary rounds was as follows:

| Round | Date |
|---|---|
| First round | 30 August or 6 September 2020 |
| Second round | 6 or 13 September 2020 |
| Third round | 20 September 2020 |
| Fourth round | 4 October 2020 |
| Fifth round | 18 October 2020 |
| Sixth round | 30–31 January 2021 |

On 28 October 2020, French President Emmanuel Macron announced a second COVID-19 lockdown, including the suspension of all amateur football, for four weeks. The following day, the FFF confirmed the suspension of senior football at all levels below Championnat National. This caused the suspension of the competition, and the postponement of the sixth round and remaining fifth round matches.

== Leagues ==
The details of the qualifying rounds for each league is separated out to individual articles, to avoid this article being too lengthy.

=== Overseas leagues ===
A total of twelve clubs qualified from the overseas leagues, two each from Guadeloupe, French Guiana, Martinique, Réunion and Mayotte, and one each from New Caledonia and Tahiti. In 2019–20 JS Saint-Pierroise from Réunion survived longest in the competition, beating Ligue 2 Niort in the ninth round, before eventually losing to Épinal in the round of 32, equalling the record for an overseas team's progression in the competition.

==== Mayotte ====
Originally, a total of 60 teams from Régionale 1, Régional 2, Régionale 3 and Régionale 4 divisions were registered for the qualifying tournament. The original structure of the tournament required a Preliminary round with four ties between Régionale 4 teams; Régionale 2 and Régionale 3 teams entering at the first round stage and Régionale 1 teams entering at the second round stage. The draw for the Preliminary round was made on 13 February 2020. Note that the Mayotte League continues to refer to the Preliminary round as the first round, and the naming convention used here is to bring the rounds in line with other regions and territories.

===== Suspension of the competition due to COVID-19 =====
Only the Preliminary round was played before the suspension of all competition due to the COVID-19 pandemic in Mayotte. On 6 July 2020, due to the state of health emergency being extended until the end of October, and the lack of any date for competition to commence, the Mayotte League were contacted by the FFF regarding how the qualifying teams would be selected. The league elected to consult with its clubs.

===== Reconfiguration and restart =====
On 27 September 2020, the Comité de Direction announced a planned restart of the competition, with 64 teams remaining, including the four qualified from the first round. The second round draw was scheduled for 9 October 2020 with matches taking place on 24 October 2020.

On 9 October, the Commission Régionale Sportive et des Terrains published the draw for the first and second rounds. The first round features the teams from divisions lower than Régional 1, including those victorious in the original Preliminary round, participating in 25 ties with two teams given byes to the second round. The second round includes the teams from Régional 1, with 7 ties and 25 teams given byes to the third round. The draw for the third and fourth rounds was made on 27 October 2020. The draw for the fifth round was made on 3 November 2020. The draw for the sixth round was made on 9 November 2020.

These matches were played on 15 November 2020.

Sixth round results: Mayotte
| Tie no | Home team (tier) | Score | Away team (tier) |
|---|---|---|---|
| 1. | (Mayotte) US Ouangani (R3) | 0–1 | FC Mtsapéré (R1) (Mayotte) |
| 2. | (Mayotte) Pamandzi SC (R3) | 1–0 | USC Anteou Poroani (R1) (Mayotte) |

Note: Mayotte League structure (no promotion to French League structure):

- Régionale 1 (R1)
- Régionale 2 (R2)
- Régionale 3 (R3)
- Régionale 4 (R4)

==== Réunion ====
Due to the COVID-19 pandemic in Réunion, the normal qualifying competition could not take place. In June 2020 the Ligue Réunionnaise de Football announced that a smaller qualifying competition, restricted to 16 teams, would take place over three rounds, with the teams involved being the 14 from Régional 1 and the 2 relegated to Régional 2 at the end of last season. On 27 July, due tot the ongoing pandemic situation, the start date of qualifying was moved to 2 September 2020. The draw for the first set of fixtures, analogous to the fourth round of qualifying, was finally made on 16 October 2020, with matches to take place over the weekend of 31 October and 1 November 2020.

These matches were played on 14 and 15 November 2020

Sixth round results: Réunion
| Tie no | Home team (tier) | Score | Away team (tier) |
|---|---|---|---|
| 1. | (Réunion) JS Saint-Pierroise (R1) | 3–0 | AF Saint-Louisien (R1) (Réunion) |
| 2. | (Réunion) US Sainte-Marienne (R1) | 2–1 | AS Sainte-Suzanne (R2) (Réunion) |

Note: Reúnion League structure (no promotion to French League structure):

- Régionale 1 (R1)
- Régionale 2 (R2)

==== French Guiana ====
On 13 July 2020, the Ligue Football Guyane proposed an alternative calendar due to the ongoing COVID situation. This proposal would have seen the competition start with the third round on 31 October 2020.

The draw was made for the third round on 28 August 2020, and was published on 7 September 2020. A total of 32 teams entered the competition, and all entered at this third round stage. The draw for the fourth round was made on 1 November 2020. The draw for the fifth round was made on 8 November 2020.

These matches were played on 21 November 2020.

Sixth round results: French Guiana
| Tie no | Home team (tier) | Score | Away team (tier) |
|---|---|---|---|
| 1. | (French Guiana) ASU Grand Santi (R1) | 4–0 | Le Geldar De Kourou (R1) (French Guiana) |
| 2. | (French Guiana) US Sinnamary (R1) | 3–1 | FC Oyapock (R1) (French Guiana) |

Note: French Guiana League structure (no promotion to French League structure):

- Régional 1 (R1)
- Régional 2 (R2)

==== Martinique ====
A total of 52 teams from the three Régionale divisions entered the competition. Ten teams (seven from Régionale 1 and three from Régionale 2) were awarded a bye in the opening round, leaving 22 ties involving 44 teams.

These matches were played on 24 October 2020.

Sixth round results: Martinique
| Tie no | Home team (tier) | Score | Away team (tier) |
|---|---|---|---|
| 1. | (Martinique) US Riveraine (R2) | 2–4 | Club Franciscain (R1) (Martinique) |
| 2. | (Martinique) AS Samaritaine (R1) | 2–1 | Golden Lion FC (R1) (Martinique) |

Note: Martinique League structure (no promotion to French League structure):

- Régionale 1 (R1)
- Régionale 2 (R2)
- Régionale 3 (R3)

==== Guadeloupe ====
The draw for the opening round was made on 21 August 2020, with a total of 48 clubs participating. To align with the other qualifying competitions, this competition starts at the second round. Sixteen clubs from the Régional 1 division were exempted to the third round.

These matches were played on 27 and 28 October 2020.

Sixth round results: Guadeloupe
| Tie no | Home team (tier) | Score | Away team (tier) |
|---|---|---|---|
| 1. | (Guadeloupe) CS Moulien (R1) | 0–1 | Phare du Canal (R1) (Guadeloupe) |
| 2. | (Guadeloupe) Stade Lamentinois (R1) | 0–1 | Unité Sainte-Rosienne (R1) (Guadeloupe) |

Note: Guadeloupe League structure (no promotion to French League structure):

- Ligue Régionale 1 (R1)
- Ligue Régionale 2 (R2)
- Ligue Régionale 3 (R3)

==== Saint Pierre and Miquelon ====
The Overseas Collectivity of Saint Pierre and Miquelon had only three teams, so there was just one match in each of two rounds, with one team receiving a bye to the second round. The winner would have gained entry to the third round draw of the Pays de la Loire region.

On 8 September 2020, the prefecture of Saint Pierre and Miquelon banned the travel of A.S. Saint Pierraise to mainland France due to the ongoing COVID-19 situation. The side had been due to depart on 12 September, travelling via Montreal and Paris.

=== Nouvelle-Aquitaine ===
A total of eleven teams qualified from the Nouvelle-Aquitaine Preliminary rounds. In 2019–20, Pau FC progressed furthest in the main competition, reaching the round of 16 before losing to Paris Saint-Germain 0–2. They were promoted to Ligue 2 in that season, so they joined the competition at the eight round instead of preliminary rounds.

A total of 674 teams entered from the region. The draw required a Preliminary round involving 132 clubs on 23 August 2020. The remaining 488 teams from the district divisions, Régional 2 and Régional 3 entered at the first round stage on 30 August 2020. The 35 Régional 1 teams entered at the second round stage on 6 September 2020.

The third round draw, which saw the entry of the Championnat National 3 teams, was made on 15 September 2020. The fourth round draw, which saw the entry of the Championnat National 2 teams, was made on 24 September 2020. The fifth round draw was made on 8 October 2020. The sixth round draw was made on 22 October 2020.

These matches were played on 30 and 31 January 2021.

Sixth round results: Nouvelle Aquitaine
| Tie no | Home team (tier) | Score | Away team (tier) |
|---|---|---|---|
| 1. | FC Libourne (5) | 7–1 | SC Saint-Jean-d'Angély (6) |
| 2. | US Lège Cap Ferret (5) | 3–1 | FC Bressuire (5) |
| 3. | Association Saint-Laurent Billère (9) | 1–1 (3–1 p) | FC Estuaire Haute Gironde (6) |
| 4. | ES La Rochelle (6) | 1–3 | Aviron Bayonnais FC (5) |
| 5. | FC des Graves (7) | 0–0 (2–3 p) | FCE Mérignac Arlac (6) |
| 6. | AS Aixoise (7) | 0–1 (Note: ES Boulazac penalised for fielding a suspended player. AS Aixoise qualify.) | ES Boulazac (6) |
| 7. | Genêts Anglet (5) | 4–0 | CS Feytiat (6) |
| 8. | Limens JSA (8) | 0–5 | Stade Poitevin FC (5) |
| 9. | ES Buxerolles (6) | 1–4 | Trélissac-Antonne Périgord FC (4) |
| 10. | OL Saint-Liguaire Niort (6) | 5–0 | CA Sainte-Hélène (7) |
| 11. | AS Panazol (7) | 1–1 (8–7 p) | CA Neuville (5) |

=== Pays de la Loire ===
A total of nine teams qualified from the Pays de la Loire Preliminary rounds. In 2019–20, FC Challans and Sablé FC progressed furthest in the main competition, reaching the ninth round before losing to Angoulême-Soyaux Charente (3–1) and Pau (on penalties) respectively.

A total of 522 teams entered from the region. The draw, made on 22 July 2020, required a Preliminary round on 23 August 2020. This round featured 300 clubs from the district divisions, with a small number of District 1 teams exempted to the first round. The first round, which saw the Régional 3 teams enter, took place on 30 August 2020. The second round, featuring the entrance of the Régional 2 teams, took place on 6 September 2020.

The third round draw, in which the Regional 1 and Championnat National 3 teamas joined the competition, was made on 10 September 2020. The fourth round draw, which saw the Championnat National 2 teams enter, was made on 23 September 2020. The fifth round draw, which saw the entry of the three Championnat National teams from the region, was made on 7 October 2020. The sixth round draw was made on 21 October 2020.

These matches were played on 30 and 31 January 2021, with two postponed to 6 and 7 February 2021.

Sixth round results: Pays de la Loire
| Tie no | Home team (tier) | Score | Away team (tier) |
|---|---|---|---|
| 1. | La Roche VF (5) | 1–3 | Sablé FC (5) |
| 2. | Élan de Gorges Foot (7) | 2–2 (5–3 p) | FC Challans (5) |
| 3. | Olympique Saumur FC (5) | 4–0 | ES Bonchamp (6) |
| 4. | Vendée Fontenay Foot (5) | 1–1 (7–6 p) | Saint-Nazaire AF (6) |
| 5. | US Bequots-Lucquois (8) | 1–1 (1–3 p) | US Changé (5) |
| 6. | Les Herbiers VF (4) | 3–3 (4–2 p) | Vendée Poiré-sur-Vie Football (5) |
| 7. | ES Vigneux (7) | 1–2 | Stade Lavallois (3) |
| 8. | Vigilante Saint Fulgent (8) | 1–3 | US Philbertine Football (5) |
| 9. | Voltigeurs de Châteaubriant (4) | 1–0 | Le Mans FC (3) |

=== Centre-Val de Loire ===
A total of four teams qualified from the Centre-Val de Loire Preliminary rounds. In 2019–20, Saint-Pryvé Saint-Hilaire FC progressed furthest in the main competition, reaching the round of 32 before losing to Monaco 1–3.

A total of 256 teams entered from the region. The draw required a Preliminary round involving 178 clubs from the district divisions and Régional 3 on 30 August 2020. The 59 clubs from the regional division (other than those Régional 3 clubs already entered) entered at the first round stage on 6 September 2020. The draw for the preliminary, first and second rounds was made on 21 July 2020.

The third round draw, which saw the entry of the Championnat National 3 clubs, was made on 10 September 2020. The fourth round draw, which saw the entry of the Championnat National 2 clubs, was made on 24 September 2020. The fifth round draw, which saw the single Championnat National side from the region enter the competition, was made on 8 October 2020. The sixth round draw was made on 20 October 2020.

These matches were played on 31 January 2021.

Sixth round results: Centre-Val de Loire
| Tie no | Home team (tier) | Score | Away team (tier) |
|---|---|---|---|
| 1. | Vierzon FC (5) | 1–2 | US Orléans (3) |
| 2. | Bourges 18 (4) | 3–2 | Bourges Foot (4) |
| 3. | SO Romorantin (4) | 3–1 | USM Montargis (5) |
| 4. | SMOC Saint-Jean-de-Braye (8) | 1–2 | Tours FC (5) |

=== Corsica ===
Two teams qualified from the Corsica Preliminary rounds. In 2019–20, FC Bastia-Borgo progressed the furthest in the main competition, reaching the ninth round before losing to Saint-Étienne 0–3.

A total of 26 teams entered from the region. The opening round of the qualifying competition, analogous to the second round, took place on 6 September 2020, with six teams from Régional 2 and below entering at this stage. The remaining 16 teams from the Regional divisions, and the three teams from Championnat National 3 entered at the third round stage on 20 September 2020. The fourth round draw, featuring teams from Championnat National 2, took place on 24 September 2020. The fifth round draw, which saw the debut of the teams from Championnat National, took place on 8 October 2020. The sixth round draw was made on 22 October 2020.

These matches were played on 31 January 2021.

Sixth round results: Corsica
| Tie no | Home team (tier) | Score | Away team (tier) |
|---|---|---|---|
| 1. | FC Balagne (6) | 0–3 | AS Furiani-Agliani (5) |
| 2. | GC Lucciana (5) | 0–3 | Gazélec Ajaccio (4) |

=== Bourgogne-Franche-Comté ===
A total of seven teams qualified from the Bourgogne-Franche-Comté Preliminary rounds. In 2019–20, ASM Belfort progressed furthest in the main competition, reaching the quarter-finals before losing to Rennes 0–3.

A total of 397 teams entered from the region. The draw therefore required a Preliminary round involving six clubs, before the first round, where the remaining 373 clubs from District and Regional leagues entered. The draw for the preliminary and first rounds was made on 13 July 2020.

The third round draw, which saw the entry of the teams from Championnat National 3, was made on 8 September 2020. The fourth round draw, which saw the entry of the teams from Championnat National 2, was made on 22 September 2020. The fifth round draw was made on 6 October 2020. The sixth round draw was made on 20 October 2020.

These matches were played on 31 January 2021.

Sixth round results: Bourgogne-Franche-Comté
| Tie no | Home team (tier) | Score | Away team (tier) |
|---|---|---|---|
| 1. | AS Belfort Sud (6) | 0–5 | Jura Sud Foot (4) |
| 2. | Racing Besançon (5) | 1–0 | ASC Saint-Apollinaire (5) |
| 3. | UF Mâconnais (6) | 2–2 (4–3 p) | Is-Selongey Football (5) |
| 4. | FC Morteau-Montlebon (5) | 1–2 | Union Cosnoise Sportive (6) |
| 5. | ASA Vauzelles (7) | 1–4 | ASM Belfort (4) |
| 6. | Jura Dolois Foot (5) | 1–1 (8–9 p) | Louhans-Cuiseaux FC (4) |
| 7. | FC Valdahon-Vercel (5) | 0–2 | CA Pontarlier (5) |

=== Grand Est ===
A total of 16 teams qualified from the Grand Est Preliminary rounds. In 2019–20, SAS Épinal progressed the furthest in the main competition, reaching the quarter-final, defeating Lille on the way, before eventually losing to Saint-Étienne.

A total of 960 teams entered from the region. All teams from the Régional and District leagues, with the exception of the six Régional 1 teams that performed the best in last years competition, entered at the first round stage. Therefore, there were 467 ties in the first round on 30 August 2020. Five of the Régional 1 clubs exempted from the first round entered at the second round stage. The remaining exempted Régional 1 club was given a bye to the third round stage.

The third round draw, which saw the entry of the teams from Championnat National 3, took place on 15 September 2020. The fourth round draw, which saw the entry of the teams from Championnat National 2, took place in three parts over the 23 and 24 September 2020. The fifth round draw was made on 7 October 2020. The sixth round draw took place on 21 October 2020.

These matches were played on 30 and 31 January 2021.

Sixth round results: Grand Est
| Tie no | Home team (tier) | Score | Away team (tier) |
|---|---|---|---|
| 1. | AS Ribeauvillé (7) | 1–1 (4–3 p) | AGIIR Florival (7) |
| 2. | US Valmont (8) | 0–3 | FC Soleil Bischheim (6) |
| 3. | FC Obermodern (6) | 2–2 (3–1 p) | US Sarre-Union (5) |
| 4. | ASC Biesheim (5) | 0–6 | SC Schiltigheim (4) |
| 5. | FCO Strasbourg Koenigshoffen 06 (7) | 3–0 | US Reipertswiller (7) |
| 6. | FCSR Haguenau (4) | 3–0 (Note: FA Illkirch Graffenstaden forfeited the tie, stating they would not play under the current conditions relating to COVID 19.) | FA Illkirch Graffenstaden (5) |
| 7. | ASL Kœtzingue (7) | 0–1 | SSEP Hombourg-Haut (7) |
| 8. | FC Saint-Louis Neuweg (5) | 6–0 (Note: Tie reversed from original draw.) | AS Heimsbrunn (9) |
| 9. | ES Villerupt-Thil (6) | 0–5 | CS Sedan Ardennes (4) |
| 10. | COS Villers (7) | 0–3 | SAS Épinal (4) |
| 11. | FC Saint-Meziery (6) | 1–1 (3–1 p) | US Vandœuvre (6) |
| 12. | RC Épernay Champagne (5) | 2–3 | EF Reims Sainte-Anne Châtillons (6) |
| 13. | AC Blainville-Damelevières (7) | 0–7 | CSO Amnéville (5) |
| 14. | AS Portugais Saint-Francois Thionville (7) | 1–1 (3–1 p) | ES Rosselange Vitry (8) |
| 15. | FC Saint-Max-Essey (7) | 0–3 | AS Prix-lès-Mézières (5) |
| 16. | FC Métropole Troyenne (6) | 0–1 | ES Thaon (5) |

=== Méditerranée ===
A total of four teams qualified from the Méditerranée Preliminary rounds. In 2019–20, Athlético Marseille progressed furthest in the main competition, reaching the round of 32 before losing to Rennes 0–2.

The number of teams entering from the region, combined with the changes to the number of teams qualifying for the seventh round, meant a Preliminary round was required for the 96 teams from District 2 and below, to be played on 23 August 2020. Remaining District 2, District 1 and Régional 2 teams entered at the first round stage on 30 August 2020. Teams from Régional 1 entered at the second round stage on 6 September 2020.

The third round draw, which saw the teams from Championnat National 3 enter, took place on 9 September 2020. The fourth round draw, which saw the teams from Championnat National 2 enter, took place on 24 September 2020. The fifth round draw was made on 8 October 2020. The sixth round draw was made on 22 October 2020.

These matches were played on 31 January 2021.

Sixth round results: Méditerranée
| Tie no | Home team (tier) | Score | Away team (tier) |
|---|---|---|---|
| 1. | Gardia Club (7) | 1–8 | ES Saint-Zacharie (6) |
| 2. | Carnoux FC (6) | 2–3 | Athlético Marseille (5) |
| 3. | AS Maximoise (6) | 1–0 | FC Martigues (4) |
| 4. | Berre SC (6) | 0–3 | Aubagne FC (4) |

=== Occitanie ===
A total of nine teams qualified from the Occitanie Preliminary rounds. In 2019–20, AS Fabrègues progressed furthest in the main competition, reaching the ninth round before losing to Paris FC 0–2.

A total of 514 teams entered from the region. All teams from Régional 1 and below, 496 in total, entered at the first round stage on 23 August 2020. The second round took place on 30 August 2020. The first two qualifying rounds, drawn on 22 July 2020, took place within individual districts of the league. To allow for a balanced draw, eight teams played outside their own district.

The third round draw, including the teams from Championnat National 3, took place on 9 September 2020. The fourth round draw, including the teams from Championnat National 2, took place on 23 September 2020. The fifth round draw, which saw the entry of the single Championnat National side in the region, took place on 6 October 2020. The sixth round draw was made on 22 October 2020.

These matches were played on 31 January 2021.

Sixth round results: Occitanie
| Tie no | Home team (tier) | Score | Away team (tier) |
|---|---|---|---|
| 1. | Lavaur FC (8) | 1–2 | Entente Saint-Clément-Montferrier (6) |
| 2. | ES Paulhan-Pézenas (10) | 0–2 | FC Marssac-Rivières-Senouillac Rives du Tarn (6) |
| 3. | Luzenac AP (6) | 0–4 | US Colomiers Football (4) |
| 4. | Canet Roussillon FC (4) | 1–0 | Stade Beaucairois (5) |
| 5. | US Castanéenne (5) | 0–2 | AS Fabrègues (5) |
| 6. | Tarbes Pyrénées Football (6) | 2–5 | Onet-le-Château (6) |
| 7. | Toulouse Rangueil FC (8) | 1–3 | Castelnau Le Crès FC (6) |
| 8. | US Salinières Aigues Mortes (6) | 0–0 (2–4 p) | Montauban FCTG (7) |
| 9. | FU Narbonne (5) | 2–3 | Olympique Alès (5) |

=== Hauts-de-France ===
A total of eighteen teams qualified from the Hauts-de-France Preliminary rounds. In 2019–20, Olympique Grande-Synthe and Stade Portelois progressed furthest in the main competition, reaching the ninth round before losing to AS Nancy (0–1) and Strasbourg (1–4) respectively.

The first round, scheduled for the weekend of 30 August 2020, saw 982 teams enter the competition, from the Regional and District divisions. The draw was carried out within each district. 49 clubs were exempted to the second round, mainly from Régional 1 and Régional 2.

The third round draw, which saw the entry of the Championnat National 3 clubs, was made on 11 September 2020. The fifth round draw, which saw the entry of the single Championnat National team from the region, took place on 7 October 2020. The sixth round draw was made on 21 October 2020.

These matches were played on 30 and 31 January 2021.

Sixth round results: Hauts-de-France
| Tie no | Home team (tier) | Score | Away team (tier) |
|---|---|---|---|
| 1. | US Jeumont (9) | 1–5 | OS Aire-sur-la-Lys (7) |
| 2. | US Chantilly (5) | 3–0 | AFC Compiègne (6) |
| 3. | US Biachoise (7) | 2–2 (2–3 p) | US Lesquin (6) |
| 4. | US Nœux-les-Mines (6) | 2–5 | AC Amiens (5) |
| 5. | Leers OF (8) | 1–2 | FC Loon-Plage (6) |
| 6. | Écureuils Itancourt-Neuville (6) | 2–1 | ES Valois Multien (6) |
| 7. | AS Marck (6) | 1–1 (6–7 p) | Olympique Saint-Quentin (4) |
| 8. | US Camon (6) | 1–3 | Arras FA (6) |
| 9. | US Tourcoing FC (6) | 0–3 (Note: US Tourcoing FC forfeited the tie, stating they would not play under the current conditions relating to COVID-19.) | US Boulogne (3) |
| 10. | AS Étaples (7) | 0–1 | Olympique Marcquois Football (5) |
| 11. | USM Marly (9) | 0–3 | ES Lambresienne (6) |
| 12. | US Crèvecœur-le-Grand (10) | 0–3 | US Laon (6) |
| 13. | AS Steenvorde (6) | 5–1 | OS Fives (7) |
| 14. | SC Bailleulois (8) | 2–1 | AS Beuvry-la-Forêt (7) |
| 15. | US Maubeuge (5) | 0–0 (2–3 p) | AS Beauvais Oise (4) |
| 16. | ESC Longueau (6) | 4–0 | AC Cambrai (6) |
| 17. | RC Labourse (9) | 1–6 | US Saint-Maurice Loos-en-Gohelle (6) |
| 18. | US Berlaimont (9) | 0–3 (Note: US Berlaimont forfeited the tie, stating they would not play under the current conditions relating to COVID-19.) | US Saint-Omer (5) |

=== Normandy ===
A total of seven teams qualified from the Normandy Preliminary rounds. In 2019–20 FC Rouen, US Granville and ESM Gonfreville all progressed furthest in the main competition, reaching the round of 32 before losing to Angers (1–4), Marseille (0–3) and Lille (0–2) respectively.

A total of 394 teams from the region entered the competition. A Preliminary round was required, with 82 teams from District leagues involved, which took place on 30 August 2020. The remaining teams from the District leagues, and teams from Régionale 2 and Régionale 3 divisions, totalling 275, entered at the first round stage on 6 September 2020. The 20 Régionale 1 teams entered at the second round stage on 13 September 2020.

The third round draw, which saw the entry of the clubs from Championnat National 3, was made on 15 September 2020. The fourth round draw, which saw the entry of the clubs from Championnat National 2, was made on 24 September 2020. The fifth round draw, which saw the entry of the two Championnat National clubs from the region, took place on 7 October 2020. The sixth round draw was made on 21 October 2020.

These matches were played on 30 and 31 January 2021.

Sixth round results: Normandy
| Tie no | Home team (tier) | Score | Away team (tier) |
|---|---|---|---|
| 1. | Olympique Pavillais (6) | 0–6 | US Quevilly-Rouen (3) |
| 2. | Évreux FC 27 (5) | 0–2 | US Avranches (3) |
| 3. | FC Flers (6) | 0–3 (Note: FC Flers forfeited the tie, stating they would not play under the current conditions relating to COVID 19.) | FC Rouen (4) |
| 4. | FC Saint-Lô Manche (5) | 1–3 | AF Virois (5) |
| 5. | FC Gisors Vexin Normand (6) | 0–1 | ESM Gonfreville (6) |
| 6. | US Ouest Cotentin (7) | 0–1 | ESFC Falaise (7) |
| 7. | AS Val de Reuil-Vaudreuil-Poses (7) | 1–7 | AG Caennaise (5) |

=== Brittany ===
A total of twelve teams qualified from the Brittany Preliminary rounds. In 2019–20, FC Guichen and Stade Briochin progressed the furthest in the main competition, reaching the ninth round before losing to Caen (1–2) and ESM Gonfreville (on penalties) respectively.

A total of 687 teams entered from the region. 666 teams entered at the first round stage, which took place on 30 August 2020, with one team given a bye to the second round. The first round draw was published on 30 July 2020. The second round draw was published on 1 September 2020.

The third round draw, which featured the teams from Championnat National 3, was made on 10 September 2020. The fourth round draw, which featured the teams from Championnat National 2, was made on 23 September 2020. The fifth round draw, which saw the two Championnat National teams from the region enter the competition, was made on 7 October 2020. The sixth round draw was made on 21 October 2020.

These matches were played on 31 January 2021.

Sixth round results: Brittany
| Tie no | Home team (tier) | Score | Away team (tier) |
|---|---|---|---|
| 1. | Gars de Saint-Yves (7) | 0–3 (Note: Gars de Saint-Yves forfeited the tie, stating they would not play under the current conditions relating to COVID-19.) | Stade Briochin (3) |
| 2. | Plougastel FC (7) | 0–0 (5–6 p) | Vannes OC (4) |
| 3. | AS Ginglin Cesson (6) | 0–4 | US Saint-Malo (4) |
| 4. | Plérin FC (7) | 2–2 (9–10 p) | Stade Plabennécois (4) |
| 5. | AL Coataudon (8) | 1–2 | US Liffré (6) |
| 6. | US Montagnarde (6) | 1–0 | Elvinoise Foot (7) |
| 7. | Saint-Pierre de Milizac (5) | 1–1 (4–3 p) | Lamballe FC (6) |
| 8. | Dinan-Léhon FC (5) | 1–0 | OC Cesson (6) |
| 9. | FC Dinardais (7) | 1–1 (6–7 p) | Saint-Colomban Sportive Locminé (5) |
| 10. | CS Bégard (6) | 0–3 | Plouzané AC (5) |
| 11. | FC Guichen (6) | 6–4 | AS Uzel-Merléac (7) |
| 12. | AS Plobannalec-Lesconil (6) | 1–5 | EA Saint-Renan (6) |

=== Paris-Île-de-France ===
A total of nine teams qualified from the Paris-Île-de-France Preliminary rounds. In 2019–20, Red Star progressed furthest in the main competition, reaching the round of 32 before losing to Nice 2–1.

On 17 July 2020, the league announced that a Preliminary round would be required, due to the reduction of teams qualifying for the seventh round, and that this round would take place on 30 August 2020. This round involved 248 teams from the District leagues. The remaining 126 teams from the District leagues entered at the first round stage, which took place on 6 September. The second round on 13 September saw the entry of the teams from the Regional leagues.

The third round draw, which saw the entry into the competition of the Championnat National 3 teams, was made on 15 September 2020. The fourth round draw, which saw the entry into the competition of the Championnat National 2 teams, was made on 24 September 2020. The fifth round draw, which saw the two Championnat National teams from the region join the competition, was made on 7 October 2020. The sixth round draw was made on 20 October 2020.

These matches were played on 30 and 31 January 2021, with one postponed until 6 February 2021.

Sixth round results: Paris-Île-de-France
| Tie no | Home team (tier) | Score | Away team (tier) |
|---|---|---|---|
| 1. | Sainte-Geneviève Sports (4) | 1–2 | US Créteil-Lusitanos (3) |
| 2. | US Villejuif (7) | 1–2 | US Sénart-Moissy (6) |
| 3. | FC Parisis (9) | 2–3 | JA Drancy (5) |
| 4. | Saint-Brice FC (6) | 4–0 | Montrouge FC 92 (6) |
| 5. | Conflans FC (6) | 2–0 (Note: Conflans FC penalised for fielding a suspended player. CA Vitry qualify.) | CA Vitry (6) |
| 6. | Saint-Maur VGA (8) | 0–2 | Football Club 93 Bobigny-Bagnolet-Gagny (4) |
| 7. | US Ivry (5) | 0–2 | Red Star FC (3) |
| 8. | ESA Linas-Montlhéry (5) | 0–1 | US Lusitanos Saint-Maur (4) |
| 9. | Mitry-Mory (7) | 0–2 | FC Fleury 91 (4) |

=== Auvergne-Rhône-Alpes ===
A total of sixteen teams qualified from the Auvergne-Rhône-Alpes Preliminary rounds. In 2019–20, FC Limonest Saint-Didier progressed the furthest in the main competition, reaching the round of 16, before losing to Dijon 2–1 after extra time.

A total of 945 teams from the region entered the competition. The draw, made on 27 July 2020, required a Preliminary round, which took place on 30 August 2020, and which saw 370 teams enter the competition, from the District leagues, division 2 and below. The ties for the first round on 6 September 2020 were also preassigned, which saw a further 475 teams enter, from the higher District leagues and Regional 3. The draw for the second round was made on 3 September 2020, and saw the entry of 48 Regional 2 teams.

The third round draw, which saw the 27 Regional 1 teams and 10 Championnat National 3 teams enter, (Note: FC Vaulx-en-Velin were given a ban for the competition in January 2020.) was made on 15 September 2020. The fourth round draw, which saw the Championnat National 2 teams enter, was made on 24 September 2020. The fifth round draw, featuring the teams from Championnat National, was made on 8 October 2020. The sixth round draw was made on 22 October 2020.

These matches were played on 30 and 31 January 2021.

Sixth round results: Auvergne-Rhône-Alpes
| Tie no | Home team (tier) | Score | Away team (tier) |
|---|---|---|---|
| 1. | Le Puy Foot 43 Auvergne (4) | 3–0 (Note: Velay FC forfeited the tie, stating they would not play under the current conditions relating to COVID-19.) | Velay FC (5) |
| 2. | Roannais Foot 42 (7) | 1–1 (2–4 p) | FC Aurillac Arpajon Cantal Auvergne (5) |
| 3. | AS Nord Vignoble (8) | 3–3 (4–3 p) | AS Craponne (8) |
| 4. | US Feurs (6) | 5–1 | AS Moulins (5) |
| 5. | US Beaumontoise (7) | 0–2 | FC Chamalières (4) |
| 6. | AS Domerat (6) | 0–6 | Moulins Yzeure Foot (4) |
| 7. | AS Dompierroise (9) | 0–3 (Note: AS Dompierroise forfeited the tie, stating they would not play under the current conditions relating to COVID-19.) | Andrézieux-Bouthéon FC (4) |
| 8. | US Mozac (8) | 0–12 | FC Villefranche (3) |
| 9. | Thonon Évian FC (5) | 2–1 | GOAL FC (4) |
| 10. | Stade Amplepuisien (8) | 2–4 | Vénissieux FC (6) |
| 11. | FC Bourgoin-Jallieu (5) | 1–4 | Annecy FC (3) |
| 12. | AC Seyssinet (6) | 2–2 (5–4 p) | AS Sud Ardèche (7) |
| 13. | Olympique Salaise Rhodia (6) | 1–2 | FC Limonest Saint-Didier (5) |
| 14. | ES Manival (7) | 0–3 (Note: ES Manival forfeited the tie, stating they would not play under the current conditions relating to COVID-19.) | GFA Rumilly-Vallières (4) |
| 15. | ES Seynod (9) | 0–2 | AS Saint-Priest (4) |
| 16. | Roanne AS Parc du Sport (8) | 1–4 | FC Rhône Vallées (6) |
