= Mounir Soufiani =

Association football manager and former player (born 1981)

Personal information
- Date of birth: 29 August 1981 (age 45)
- Place of birth: Bourges, France
- Position: Defender

Team information
- Current team: Bourges B (manager)

Youth career
- 2000–2001: FC Bourges

Senior career*
Years	Team	Apps	(Gls)
2001–2003	Laval	7	(0)
2004	→ St. Gallen (loan)	8	(1)
2004–2005	Neuchâtel Xamax	30	(1)
2005–2006	FC Schaffhausen	12	(0)
2006–2007	Mons	9	(0)
2007–2008	Antwerp	11	(2)
2008–2011	Libourne		
2011–2012	Béziers	21	(0)
2012–2013	Bergerac	18	(1)
2013–2014	Libourne		
2014–2015	Bourges Foot		

International career
	Morocco U23	1	(0)

Managerial career
- 2017–2018: Bourges Foot (assistant)
- 2018–2021: Bourges 18 B
- 2021–: Bourges B
- * Club domestic league appearances and goals

Mounir Soufiani (Arabic: منير صوفاني, born 29 August 1981) is a football manager and former professional player who played as a defender. As of the 2021–22 season, he is the head coach of the reserve team of French club Bourges. Born in France, he is a former Morocco youth international.
