= 2020–21 Championnat National 2 =

Championnat National 2
- Season: 2020–21
- Dates: 22 August 2020 – 23 April 2021
- Champions: None
- Promoted: None
- Relegated: None
- Biggest home win: Reims (res) 5–0 Schiltigheim; Group B, Round 4, 5 September 2020; GOAL FC 6–1 Monaco (res); Group C, Round 7, 26 September 2020; Andrézieux 5–0 Hyères; Group C, Round 8, 10 October 2020; Bourges 18 5–0 Angoulême; Group D, Round 8, 10 October 2020
- Biggest away win: Mont-de-Marsan 0–4 Bourges Foot; Group D, Round 5, 12 September 2020
- Highest scoring: 7 goals GOAL FC 6–1 Monaco (res); Group C, Round 7, 26 September 2020; Plabennec 4–3 Poissy; Group A, Round 8, 10 October 2020
- All statistics correct as of 14:32, 23 April 2021 (UTC).

The 2020–21 Championnat National 2 is the 23rd season of the fourth tier in the French football league system. This season the competition is being contested by 64 clubs split geographically across four groups of 16 teams. The teams included amateur clubs (although a few are semi-professional) and the reserve teams of professional clubs.

After a suspension starting in October 2020 and a proposal in February 2021 to change the format, the season was declared void by the FFF on 23 April 2021 due to the ongoing COVID-19 pandemic in France.

== Teams ==
On 17 July 2020, the FFF ratified the constitution of the competition, and published the groups as follows:

- 47 clubs who were neither relegated or promoted from the 2019–20 Championnat National 2 groups.
- 4 teams relegated from 2019–20 Championnat National (Le Puy, Toulon, Gazélec Ajaccio and Béziers).
- 12 teams promoted from 2019–20 Championnat National 3. (Mont-de-Marsan, Châteaubriant, Bourges 18, Auxerre (res), Metz (res), Canet Roussillon, Beauvais, SM Caen (res), Plabennec, Versailles, Rumilly-Vallières and Aubagne).
- 1 team reprieved from relegation from the 2019–20 Championnat National 2 groups (Saint-Priest).

On 27 July 2020, the Appeals committee of the DNCG confirmed that Athlético Marseille would be allowed to play in Championnat National 2, although no decision was made which group they would be placed in. Three days later, the disciplinary committee of the FFF announced that they were demoting the club back to National 3, due to the production of fraudulent documentation at the end of the 2018–19 season.

== Impact of COVID-19 on the season ==
The start of the season was impacted by the ongoing COVID-19 situation. Two game-week one matches, between Jura Sud Foot and Saint-Priest, and Bourges 18 and Le Puy were postponed due to a number of positive COVID-19 tests at Jura Sud Foot and Bourges 18. The game-week two match between Marignane-Gignac and Jura Sud Foot was also postponed.

Jura Sud Foot had a third postponement in game-week three, with the match against Rumilly-Vallières being called off. Their game-week four game against Louhans-Cuiseaux was initially postponed by one day to Sunday 6 September, against the wishes of the club, who wanted it postponed due to the team having not trained for 15 days. The FFF insisted the game go ahead, but Jura Sud Foot turned out just eight players, and a first-minute injury caused the game to be abandoned by the referee.

Two other Group C games in game-week four were also postponed: Andrézieux-Bouthéon v Monaco (res) and Toulon v Marseille (res).

Game-week 5 games between Angers (res) and Le Puy in Group D and between Marseille (res) and Saint-Priest in Group C were postponed, as were Game-week 6 games between Châteaubriant and Poissy, and between Le Puy and Nantes (res), due to both visiting teams having positive case. Jura Sud Foot suffered their fourth postponement of the season when their game-week 6 match at Grasse was postponed due to the home team having positive cases. Haguenau versus Bobigny in the same game-week was also postponed due to a positive case for the home team.

Three game-week 7 matches in Group C were postponed, featuring Hyères, Grasse, Martigues, Toulon, Olympic Marseille (res) and Rumilly-Vallières. Eight games across groups A, B and C were postponed in game-week 9.

On 28 October 2020, French President Emmanuel Macron announced a second COVID-19 lockdown, including the suspension of all amateur football, for four weeks. The following day, the FFF confirmed the suspension of senior football at all levels below Championnat National.

On 18 February 2021, the FFF announced that the competition would resume in full on 13 March 2021, with any previously postponed games able to take place a week earlier on 6 March, and also on 27 February for clubs no longer involved in the Coupe de France. On 3 March 2021, after just five rearranged matches had been played, Roxana Mărăcineanu, the Minister of Sports, walked back the decision to allow resumption on the grounds of a degrading health situation.

=== Change to format of the competition ===
On 22 February 2021, the FFF announce a change to the format of the competition, due to insufficient time to complete the remaining scheduled fixtures. The first half of the tournament, consisting of each team playing each other team in the group once, for a total of fifteen games each, will complete on 24 April. Between 8 May and 12 June, in each group the top 8 clubs will play in a group round-robin to decide promotion, and the bottom 8 clubs will play in a group round-robin to decide relegation. Points from the first phase will be carried forward to the promotion and relegation groups.

=== Voiding of the competition ===
On 23 April 2021, the COMEX (executive committee) of the FFF announced the end of the Championnat National 2 season due to the ongoing COVID-19 situation. The announcement also confirmed no promotions or relegations would take place, with the season void.

== League tables ==
The league standings are a record of the games that took place before the competition was declared void.

=== Group A ===
Pos	Team	Pld	W	D	L	GF	GA	GD	Pts
1	Saint-Pryvé	8	6	2	0	12	3	+9	20
2	Châteaubriant	9	4	4	1	12	8	+4	16
3	Sainte-Geneviève	9	4	4	1	10	6	+4	16
4	SM Caen (res)	9	4	3	2	10	7	+3	15
5	Fleury	9	3	4	2	7	6	+1	13
6	Chartres	9	3	3	3	13	11	+2	12
7	Granville (Note: Granville were penalised for fielding a suspended player in the game against Poissy on 12 September 2020. The game originally ended in a 2–1 win for Granville, but has now been awarded to Poissy 3–0.)	9	3	3	3	6	8	−2	12
8	Plabennec	9	3	3	3	11	13	−2	12
9	Rouen	8	2	4	2	4	4	0	10
10	Versailles	9	3	1	5	11	13	−2	10
11	Guingamp (res)	9	1	6	2	7	9	−2	9
12	Lorient (res)	9	1	6	2	5	8	−3	9
13	Saint-Malo	9	1	5	3	8	10	−2	8
14	Blois	8	2	2	4	11	15	−4	8
15	Vannes	8	2	2	4	9	10	−1	8
16	Poissy	9	1	2	6	8	13	−5	5

Updated to match(es) played on 28 October 2020. Source: foot-national.com
Rules for classification: 1) points; 2) head-to-head results; 3) head-to-head goal difference; 4) goal difference; 5) number of goals scored; 6) fair play points; 7) draw

=== Group B ===
Pos	Team	Pld	W	D	L	GF	GA	GD	Pts	
1	Paris 13 Atletico	9	4	4	1	10	4	+6	16	
2	Épinal	8	5	0	3	10	8	+2	15	
3	Haguenau	9	3	5	1	9	6	+3	14	
4	FC 93	8	4	2	2	8	10	−2	14	
5	Metz (res)	8	4	1	3	9	7	+2	13	
6	Saint-Maur	8	4	1	3	13	7	+6	13	
7	Beauvais	9	3	4	2	12	9	+3	13	
8	Auxerre (res)	9	3	4	2	13	13	0	13	
9	Lens (res) (Note: Lens (res) were penalised for a currently unpublished infringement in the game against Paris 13 Atletico on 28 August 2020. The game finished 0–3, so remained unchanged. Lens (res) were deducted a penalty point.)	8	4	2	2	12	14	−2	13	
10	Gazélec Ajaccio (R)	9	3	3	3	12	9	+3	12	Relegation to National 3
11	Belfort	9	3	3	3	12	10	+2	12	
12	Sedan (P)	8	2	5	1	7	6	+1	11	Promotion after the season to National
13	Reims (res)	9	2	3	4	15	12	+3	9	
14	L'Entente SSG	9	2	1	6	8	13	−5	7	
15	Schiltigheim	9	1	2	6	5	20	−15	5	
16	Saint-Quentin	9	0	4	5	6	13	−7	4	

Updated to match(es) played on 28 FebRuary 2021. Source: foot-national.com
Rules for classification: 1) points; 2) head-to-head results; 3) head-to-head goal difference; 4) goal difference; 5) number of goals scored; 6) fair play points; 7) draw
(P) Promoted; (R) Relegated

=== Group C ===
Pos	Team	Pld	W	D	L	GF	GA	GD	Pts
1	Aubagne	9	5	2	2	15	10	+5	17
2	GOAL FC	9	5	2	2	18	10	+8	17
3	Toulon	9	5	1	3	15	8	+7	16
4	Martigues	8	5	1	2	15	9	+6	16
5	Fréjus Saint-Raphaël	8	4	3	1	9	2	+7	15
6	Andrézieux	9	4	2	3	15	11	+4	14
7	Hyères	9	4	1	4	10	12	−2	13
8	Grasse	8	3	3	2	10	6	+4	12
9	Saint-Priest	9	2	6	1	14	14	0	12
10	Lyon (res)	9	2	4	3	12	14	−2	10
11	Rumilly-Vallières	9	2	4	3	11	14	−3	10
12	Monaco (res)	9	2	2	5	9	18	−9	8
13	Louhans-Cuiseaux	8	2	2	4	11	12	−1	8
14	Jura Sud Foot (Note: On 6 September 2020, Jura Sud Foot were due to play at Louhans-Cuiseaux. Due to COVID-19 cases, they requested the game be postponed. The FFF denied the request. Jura Sud Foot attended the game with only 8 players. In the first minute of the game, a player was injured and couldn't continue, causing the referee to abandon it. On 14 September 2020, the FFF penalised Jura Sud Foot, awarding Louhans-Cuiseaux a 3–0 win and deducting a point from Jura Sud Foot. On 26 October 2020 it was announced that Jura Sud Foot had successfully appealed the penalty, and the match was to be replayed.)	7	1	3	3	9	12	−3	6
15	Olympic Marseille (res)	9	1	3	5	6	17	−11	6
16	Marignane Gignac	9	1	3	5	9	19	−10	6

Updated to match(es) played on 27 February 2021. Source: foot-national.com
Rules for classification: 1) points; 2) head-to-head results; 3) head-to-head goal difference; 4) goal difference; 5) number of goals scored; 6) fair play points; 7) draw

=== Group D ===
Pos	Team	Pld	W	D	L	GF	GA	GD	Pts	
1	Béziers	9	6	3	0	15	5	+10	21	
2	Trélissac	9	4	5	0	13	5	+8	17	
3	Le Puy	8	4	4	0	12	4	+8	16	
4	Colomiers	9	4	4	1	7	4	+3	16	
5	Romorantin	8	4	2	2	10	3	+7	14	
6	Les Herbiers	9	4	2	3	11	5	+6	14	
7	Angers (res)	9	3	4	2	11	12	−1	13	
8	Moulins Yzeure	9	2	5	2	10	7	+3	11	
9	Bourges Foot (M)	8	3	2	3	11	7	+4	11	Merged after the season
10	Nantes (res)	9	2	4	3	6	10	−4	10	
11	Bergerac	8	2	4	2	9	7	+2	10	
12	Canet Roussillon	9	2	4	3	9	10	−1	10	
13	Chamalières	9	2	4	3	5	8	−3	10	
14	Angoulême	9	1	3	5	5	21	−16	6	
15	Bourges 18 (M)	9	1	0	8	10	19	−9	3	Merged after the season
16	Mont-de-Marsan	9	0	2	7	2	19	−17	2	

Updated to match(es) played on 27 February 2021. Source: foot-national.com
Rules for classification: 1) points; 2) head-to-head results; 3) head-to-head goal difference; 4) goal difference; 5) number of goals scored; 6) fair play points; 7) draw
(M) Merged after the season

== Top scorers ==
As of 28 October 2020.

Rank	Player	Club	Goals
1	(England) Reo Griffiths	Lyon (res)	6
1	(France) Sébastien Persico	Chartres	6
1	(France) Issouf Macalou	GOAL FC	6
1	(France) Lassine Sinayoko	Auxerre (res)	6
1	(France) Manuel Delgado	Toulon	6
1	(Algeria) Souleiman Djabour	Andrézieux	6
1	(France) Alexy Bosetti	Le Puy	6
8	(Belgium) David Pollet	Gazélec Ajaccio	5
8	(France) Esteban Lepaul	Épinal	5
8	(Guinea) Fode Guirassy	Béziers	5
8	(France) Samy Baghdadi	Grasse	5
8	(France) Dramane Sissoko	Hyères	5
