= 2018–19 Championnat National 3 =

Championnat National 3
- Season: 2018–19
- Champions: Saint-Quentin
- Promoted: 12 teams (see Season outcomes section)
- Relegated: 35 teams (see Season outcomes section)
- Top goalscorer: 27 goals Ibrahima Keita, Bourges Foot
- Biggest home win: Angoulême 7–0 Cestas; Group A, Round 23, 4 May 2019; Montluçon 7–0 Ytrac; Group M, Round 26, 26 May 2019
- Biggest away win: Tours (res) 0–7 Bourges Foot; Group C, Round 8, 3 November 2018; Fougères 0–7 Lannion; Group K, Round 21, 13 April 2019
- Highest scoring: 10 goals Avallon 2–8 Auxerre (res); Group E, Round 16, 17 February 2019; Niort (res) 5–5 Lège Cap Ferret; Group A, Round 20, 6 April 2019
- All statistics correct as of 09:03, 4 June 2019 (UTC).

The 2018–19 Championnat National 3 is the second season of the fifth tier in the French football league system in its current format. The competition is due to be contested by 168 clubs split geographically across 12 groups of 14 teams. The teams include amateur clubs (although a few are semi-professional) and the reserve teams of professional clubs.

== Teams ==
On 13 July, the French Football Federation ratified the constitution of the competition, and published the groups as follows:

- 123 teams that were not relegated or promoted from the 2017–18 Championnat National 3 groups.
- 9 teams relegated from 2017–18 Championnat National 2 after any reprieves and additional administrative relegations to the Regional Leagues (Raon-l'Étape, Fontenay, Rennes (res), Tarbes, Montceau, St-Louis Neuweg, Limoges, Beauvais and AC Amiens)
- 36 teams promoted from Regional Division d'Honneur (as shown in the table below).

Teams promoted to Championnat National 3
Region	Team	Method of Qualification
Nouvelle-Aquitaine	Cestas	Champion, R1 Pool B
Nouvelle-Aquitaine	Montmorillon	Champion, R1 Pool A
Nouvelle-Aquitaine	Chauvigny	Runner-up, R1 Pool A
Pays de la Loire	Le Mans (res)	Champion, R1 Group A
Pays de la Loire	Saint-Nazaire	Champion, R1 Group B
Pays de la Loire	Saumur	Playoff winner
Centre-Val de Loire	Montlouis-sur-Loire	Champion, R1
Centre-Val de Loire	Amilly	Runner-up, R1
Centre-Val de Loire	Saint-Jean-le-Blanc (Note: USM Saran, who finished 3rd, were ineligible for promotion for financial reasons.)	4th place, R1
Méditerranée-Corsica	Côte Bleue	Champion, R1 Méditerranée
Méditerranée-Corsica	Bastelicaccia	Champion R1 Corsica
Méditerranée-Corsica	Istres (Note: extra promotion place due to reprieve in National 2 of Marseille (res))	Runner-up R1 Méditerranée
Bourgogne-Franche-Comté	La Charité	Champion, R1 Pool A
Bourgogne-Franche-Comté	Grandvillars	Champion, R1 Pool B
Bourgogne-Franche-Comté	Morteau-Montlebon	Runner-up, R1 Pool B
Grand Est	Troyes	Champion, R1 Champagne-Ardenne
Grand Est	Thaon	Champion, R1 Lorraine
Grand Est	ASPV Strasbourg	Champion, R1 Alsace
Occitanie	Stade Beaucairois	Champion, R1 Languedoc-Roussillon
Occitanie	Muret	Champion, R1 Midi-Pyrenées
Occitanie	Rodez (res)	Best Runner-up
Hauts-de-France	Le Touquet	Champion, R1 Nord-Pas de Calais
Hauts-de-France	Chantilly (res) (Note: Champions of R1 Picardie, AC Amiens (res) were ineligible due to their senior team being relegated from National 2)	Runner-up, R1 Picardie
Hauts-de-France	Olympique Marcquois	Runner-up, R1 Nord-Pas de Calais
Normandy	ASPTT Caen	Champion, R1 Pool A
Normandy	Déville-Maromme	Champion, R1 Pool B
Normandy	Cherbourg	Runner-up, R1 Pool A
Brittany	Plouzané	Champion, R1 Pool A
Brittany	Fougères (Note: Champion of R1 Pool B, Stade Rennais (3rd team) were ineligible for promotion under the rules of the competition)	Runner-up, R1 Pool B
Brittany	Stade Pontivyen	Runner-up, R1 Pool A
Paris Île-de-France	Le Mée	Champion, R1
Paris Île-de-France	Meaux Academy	Runner-up, R1
Paris Île-de-France	Brétigny	3rd place, R1
Auvergne-Rhône-Alpes	Moulins	Champion, R1 Ouest
Auvergne-Rhône-Alpes	Rumilly-Vallières	Champion, R1 Est
Auvergne-Rhône-Alpes	Lyon-Duchère (res)	Runner-up, R1 Est

== Promotion and relegation ==
If eligible, the top team in each group will be promoted to Championnat National 2. If a team finishing top of the group is ineligible, or declines promotion, the next eligible team in that group will be promoted.

Generally, three teams will be relegated from each group to their respective top regional league, subject to reprieves. Extra teams will be relegated from a group if more than one team is relegated to that group from Championnat National 2. In the case that no teams are relegated to a group from Championnat National 2, one less team will be relegated from that group to the regional league.

Reserve teams whose training centre is categorised as category 2B or lower cannot be promoted to Championnat National 2 by the rules of the competition. It was announced in September 2018 that the following reserve teams would be ineligible for promotion following the categorisation of their training centres: AC Ajaccio, Amiens SC, Brest, Clermont, Dijon and Paris FC.

== League tables ==
=== Group A: Nouvelle-Aquitaine ===
Pos	Team	Pld	W	D	L	GF	GA	GD	Pts	Promotion or relegation
1	Angoulême (P)	26	19	4	3	56	24	+32	61	Promotion to National 2
2	Lège Cap Ferret	26	13	8	5	41	29	+12	47	
3	Niort (res)	26	14	5	7	59	40	+19	47	
4	Bressuire	26	12	7	7	41	31	+10	43	
5	Anglet	26	11	7	8	32	28	+4	40	
6	Mérignac Arlac	26	11	5	10	34	24	+10	38	
7	Bayonne	26	10	8	8	32	26	+6	38	
8	Limoges (R)	26	9	11	6	23	25	−2	38	Administrative relegation to Regional 1
9	Chauvigny	26	9	6	11	25	29	−4	33	
10	Poitiers	26	9	6	11	28	31	−3	33	
11	Pau (res)	26	8	7	11	43	43	0	31	Reprieved from relegation (see Reprieves)
12	Cestas (R)	26	4	8	14	23	51	−28	20	Relegation to Regional 1
13	Montmorillon (R)	26	4	5	17	17	41	−24	17	Relegation to Regional 1
14	Chauray (R)	26	4	3	19	15	47	−32	15	Relegation to Regional 1

Source: Ligue de Football Nouvelle Aquitaine
Rules for classification: 1) points; 2) head-to-head results; 3) head-to-head goal difference; 4) goal difference; 5) number of goals scored; 6) fair play points; 7) draw
(P) Promoted; (R) Relegated

=== Group B: Pays de la Loire ===
Pos	Team	Pld	W	D	L	GF	GA	GD	Pts	Promotion or relegation
1	Angers (res) (P)	26	14	5	7	39	20	+19	47	Promotion to National 2
2	Challans	26	13	6	7	39	32	+7	45	
3	Fontenay	26	12	7	7	36	29	+7	43	
4	Châteaubriant	26	13	2	11	50	37	+13	41	
5	Saint-Nazaire (R)	26	11	5	10	31	28	+3	38	Administrative relegation to Regional 1
6	Vertou	26	10	8	8	31	29	+2	38	
7	Saumur	26	10	6	10	35	37	−2	36	
8	La Roche	26	10	6	10	30	29	+1	36	
9	La Flèche	26	9	7	10	24	26	−2	34	
10	Le Mans (res)	26	9	6	11	32	34	−2	33	
11	Sablé	26	9	3	14	35	45	−10	30	
12	Les Herbiers (res)	26	7	8	11	28	36	−8	29	
13	Laval (res)	26	6	9	11	36	44	−8	27	Reprieved from relegation (see Reprieves)
14	La Suze (R)	26	7	6	13	31	51	−20	27	Relegation to Regional 1

Source: Ligue de Football des Pays de la Loire
Rules for classification: 1) points; 2) head-to-head results; 3) head-to-head goal difference; 4) goal difference; 5) number of goals scored; 6) fair play points; 7) draw
(P) Promoted; (R) Relegated

=== Group C: Centre-Val de Loire ===
Pos	Team	Pld	W	D	L	GF	GA	GD	Pts	Promotion or relegation
1	Bourges Foot (P)	26	18	3	5	66	30	+36	57	Promotion to National 2
2	Avoine Chinon	26	12	7	7	36	27	+9	43	
3	Ouest Tourangeau	26	11	9	6	41	33	+8	42	
4	Châteauroux (res)	26	11	9	6	47	33	+14	42	
5	Vierzon	26	11	9	6	36	23	+13	42	
6	Orléans (res)	26	11	9	6	47	38	+9	42	
7	Montlouis-sur-Loire	26	11	6	9	42	41	+1	39	
8	Bourges 18	26	7	10	9	32	40	−8	31	
9	Chartres (res)	26	8	6	12	34	53	−19	30	
10	Montargis	26	8	6	12	38	50	−12	30	
11	Tours (res)	26	8	5	13	32	47	−15	29	
12	Châteauneuf-sur-Loire (Note: Châteauneuf-sur-Loire were penalised for fielding a suspended player in the match at Montargis on 16 March 2019. The original scoreline was 2–4. Montargis were awarded a 3–0 victory and Châteauneuf-sur-Loire were deducted a penalty point.)	26	8	5	13	35	45	−10	28	
13	Amilly (R)	26	5	7	14	31	43	−12	22	Relegation to Regional 1
14	Saint-Jean-le-Blanc (R)	26	7	1	18	41	55	−14	22	Relegation to Regional 1

Source: Ligue Centre-Val de Loire de Football
Rules for classification: 1) points; 2) head-to-head results; 3) head-to-head goal difference; 4) goal difference; 5) number of goals scored; 6) fair play points; 7) draw
(P) Promoted; (R) Relegated

=== Group D: Provence-Alpes-Côte d'Azur-Corsica ===
Pos	Team	Pld	W	D	L	GF	GA	GD	Pts	Promotion or relegation
1	SC Bastia (P)	24	19	4	1	62	9	+53	61	Promotion to National 2
2	Aubagne	24	13	5	6	39	22	+17	44	
3	Côte Bleue	24	12	7	5	37	29	+8	43	
4	Saint-Jean Beaulieu	24	12	7	5	38	24	+14	43	
5	Cannes	24	12	5	7	37	28	+9	41	
6	Gémenos	24	10	6	8	33	31	+2	36	
7	Lucciana	24	9	7	8	33	35	−2	34	
8	Istres	24	10	3	11	29	30	−1	33	
9	AC Ajaccio (res)	24	8	3	13	37	45	−8	27	
10	Bastelicaccia (R)	24	6	6	12	31	39	−8	24	Relegation to Regional 1
11	Cannet (R)	24	6	5	13	36	47	−11	23	Relegation to Regional 1
12	Le Pontet (R)	24	4	2	18	19	50	−31	14	Relegation to Regional 1
13	ÉF Bastia (R)	24	3	4	17	17	59	−42	13	Relegation to Regional 1
14	Saint-Rémy (Note: Saint-Rémy forfeited the games against Lucciana on 2 February 2019 and Bastelicaccia on 16 February 2019. They were penalised one point for each, and the results were recorded as 3–0. On 19 February 2019 Saint-Rémy declared a general forfeit, withdrawing from the league. Their results were expunged from the table.) (R)	0	0	0	0	0	0	0	0	Relegation to Regional 1

Source: fff.fr
Rules for classification: 1) points; 2) head-to-head results; 3) head-to-head goal difference; 4) goal difference; 5) number of goals scored; 6) fair play points; 7) draw
(P) Promoted; (R) Relegated

=== Group E: Bourgogne-Franche-Comté ===
Pos	Team	Pld	W	D	L	GF	GA	GD	Pts	Promotion or relegation
1	Dijon (res)	26	19	3	4	60	26	+34	60	
2	Louhans-Cuiseaux (P)	26	17	5	4	66	32	+34	56	Promotion to National 2
3	Auxerre (res)	26	15	8	3	51	22	+29	53	
4	Besançon Football	26	13	10	3	37	17	+20	49	
5	Montceau	26	13	7	6	47	32	+15	46	
6	Gueugnon	26	10	9	7	27	23	+4	39	
7	Jura Dolois	26	10	8	8	43	36	+7	38	
8	Sochaux (res)	26	6	11	9	29	34	−5	29	
9	Is-Selongey	26	6	8	12	40	47	−7	26	
10	Morteau-Montlebon (Note: Morteau-Montlebon were penalised for fielding a suspended player in the match against Louhans-Cuiseaux on 4 May 2019. The original scoreline was 1–0. The revised scoreline is 0–3. Morteau-Montelbon were deducted a penalty point.)	26	5	10	11	24	41	−17	24	
11	Racing Besançon	26	5	6	15	29	46	−17	21	
12	La Charité (Note: On 2 May 2019 La Charité were deducted 3 points for failure to comply with the obligations for clubs participating in Championnat National 3, namely by not placing their own youth teams in an official competition, due to agreeing a partial merger at youth level with Chaulgnes FC. The sanction has been appealed, but the appeal will not be heard until after the competition has finished.) (R)	26	5	8	13	30	55	−25	20	Relegation to Regional 1
13	Avallon (Note: On 2 May 2019 Avallon were deducted 3 points for failure to comply with the obligations for clubs participating in Championnat National 3, namely by not placing their own U18 team in an official competition, due to agreeing a partial merger at youth level with Avallon-Vauban FC. The sanction is subject to appeal at the end of the competition.) (R)	26	3	7	16	27	58	−31	13	Relegation to Regional 1
14	Grandvillars (R)	26	2	6	18	31	72	−41	12	Relegation to Regional 1

Source: Ligue de Football Bourgogne-Franche-Comté
Rules for classification: 1) points; 2) head-to-head results; 3) head-to-head goal difference; 4) goal difference; 5) number of goals scored; 6) fair play points; 7) draw
(P) Promoted; (R) Relegated

=== Group F: Grand Est ===
Pos	Team	Pld	W	D	L	GF	GA	GD	Pts	Promotion or relegation
1	Mulhouse (P)	26	14	6	6	40	21	+19	48	Promotion to National 2
2	RC Strasbourg (res)	26	13	8	5	48	32	+16	47	
3	Sarre-Union	26	11	10	5	37	28	+9	43	
4	Thaon	26	10	8	8	42	40	+2	38	
5	ESTAC Troyes (res)	26	8	12	6	38	26	+12	36	
6	St-Louis Neuweg	26	9	8	9	32	34	−2	35	
7	FCA Troyes	26	9	7	10	25	22	+3	34	
8	ASPV Strasbourg	26	9	6	11	34	41	−7	33	
9	Biesheim	26	9	6	11	32	38	−6	33	
10	Raon-l'Étape	26	9	6	11	38	44	−6	33	
11	Amnéville	26	8	8	10	36	41	−5	32	
12	Sarreguemines	26	7	10	9	44	48	−4	31	Reprieved from relegation (see Reprieves)
13	Nancy (res) (R)	26	7	8	11	31	43	−12	29	Relegation to Regional 1
14	Épernay (R)	26	5	5	16	28	47	−19	20	Relegation to Regional 1

Source: Ligue du Grant Est de Football
Rules for classification: 1) points; 2) head-to-head results; 3) head-to-head goal difference; 4) goal difference; 5) number of goals scored; 6) fair play points; 7) draw
(P) Promoted; (R) Relegated

=== Group H: Occitanie ===
Pos	Team	Pld	W	D	L	GF	GA	GD	Pts	Promotion or relegation
1	Montpellier (res) (P)	26	16	6	4	52	23	+29	54	Promotion to National 2
2	Alès	26	16	5	5	46	22	+24	53	
3	Muret	26	10	11	5	34	27	+7	41	
4	Canet Roussillon	26	9	8	9	21	20	+1	35	
5	Toulouse (res)	26	9	8	9	37	31	+6	35	
6	Balma	26	9	7	10	24	30	−6	34	
7	Stade Beaucairois	26	9	7	10	29	30	−1	34	
8	Fabrègues	26	9	7	10	26	30	−4	34	
9	Rodéo (Note: Rodéo deducted three points as a result of a disciplinary issue in a game during the 2017–18 season against Montpellier (res).)	26	8	11	7	28	27	+1	32	
10	Blagnac	26	9	5	12	24	31	−7	32	
11	Rodez (res)	26	7	10	9	27	36	−9	31	
12	Agde	26	8	7	11	27	35	−8	31	Reprieved from relegation (see Reprieves)
13	Lozère (R)	26	7	8	11	25	29	−4	29	Relegation to Regional 1
14	Tarbes (R)	26	2	8	16	15	44	−29	14	Relegation to Regional 1

Source: Lige de Football d'Occitanie
Rules for classification: 1) points; 2) head-to-head results; 3) head-to-head goal difference; 4) goal difference; 5) number of goals scored; 6) fair play points; 7) draw
(P) Promoted; (R) Relegated

=== Group I: Hauts-de-France ===
Pos	Team	Pld	W	D	L	GF	GA	GD	Pts	Promotion or relegation
1	Saint-Quentin (P)	26	15	9	2	48	20	+28	54	Promotion to National 2
2	Beauvais	26	15	6	5	47	23	+24	51	
3	AC Amiens	26	13	8	5	34	20	+14	47	
4	Grande-Synthe	26	12	4	10	42	36	+6	40	
5	Amiens SC (res)	26	11	6	9	39	31	+8	39	
6	Chambly (res)	26	9	12	5	33	27	+6	39	
7	Boulogne (res) (Note: Boulogne (res) penalised for fielding a suspended player in the away match against Olympique Marcquois on 18 August 2018. The original scoreline was 1–1. Olympique Marquois were awarded the game 3–0 and Boulogne (res) were deducted a point.)	26	11	4	11	32	31	+1	36	
8	Maubeuge	26	8	10	8	24	21	+3	34	
9	Le Touquet	26	9	7	10	30	40	−10	34	
10	Olympique Marcquois	26	8	8	10	32	39	−7	32	
11	Senlis (R)	26	8	6	12	28	41	−13	30	Relegation to Regional 1
12	Dunkerque (res) (R)	26	8	4	14	33	42	−9	28	Relegation to Regional 1
13	Tourcoing (R)	26	7	5	14	29	37	−8	26	Relegation to Regional 1
14	Chantilly (R)	26	1	5	20	25	68	−43	8	Relegation to Regional 1

Source: Ligue de Football des Hauts-de-France
Rules for classification: 1) points; 2) head-to-head results; 3) head-to-head goal difference; 4) goal difference; 5) number of goals scored; 6) fair play points; 7) draw
(P) Promoted; (R) Relegated

=== Group J: Normandy ===
Pos	Team	Pld	W	D	L	GF	GA	GD	Pts	Promotion or relegation
1	Rouen (P)	26	18	6	2	42	10	+32	60	Promotion to National 2
2	Évreux	26	14	11	1	51	24	+27	53	
3	Alençon (Note: Alençon were penalised for unknown reasons as a result of the game at Rouen on 12 January 2019. The original scoreline was 3–0. The scoreline was maintained. Alençon were deducted a penalty point.)	26	13	7	6	44	33	+11	45	
4	Saint-Lô	26	11	6	9	42	36	+6	39	
5	SM Caen (res)	26	11	6	9	42	36	+6	39	
6	Dieppe	26	11	4	11	35	36	−1	37	
7	Gonfreville	26	11	4	11	43	39	+4	37	
8	Avranches (res) (Note: Avranches (res) were penalised for fielding a suspended player in the game against Évreux on 4 May 2019. The original scoreline was 1–0. The revised scoreline is 3–0. Avranches (res) were deducted a penalty point.)	26	8	8	10	42	42	0	31	
9	Quevilly-Rouen (res)	26	8	6	12	35	37	−2	30	
10	Cherbourg	26	8	4	14	35	46	−11	28	
11	Pacy Ménilles	26	7	7	12	31	51	−20	28	
12	ASPTT Caen (Note: ASPTT Caen were penalised for fielding a suspended player in the game at Alençon on 24 November 2018. The original scoreline was 2–2. The revised scoreline is 3–0. ASPTT Caen were deducted a penalty point.) (R)	26	7	7	12	42	51	−9	27	Relegation to Regional 1
13	Bayeux (Note: Bayeux were penalised for fielding a suspended player in the game at Dieppe on 24 November 2018. The original scoreline was 1–0. The revised scoreline is 3–0. Dieppe were deducted a penalty point.) (R)	26	6	6	14	27	46	−19	23	Relegation to Regional 1
14	Déville-Maromme (R)	26	6	4	16	26	50	−24	22	Relegation to Regional 1

Source: Ligue de Football de Normandie
Rules for classification: 1) points; 2) head-to-head results; 3) head-to-head goal difference; 4) goal difference; 5) number of goals scored; 6) fair play points; 7) draw
(P) Promoted; (R) Relegated

=== Group K: Brittany ===
Pos	Team	Pld	W	D	L	GF	GA	GD	Pts	Promotion or relegation
1	Guingamp (res) (P)	26	19	4	3	50	14	+36	61	Promotion to National 2
2	Dinan-Léhon	26	17	7	2	58	21	+37	58	
3	Rennes (res)	26	12	10	4	41	19	+22	46	
4	Saint-Colomban Locminé	26	13	5	8	35	28	+7	44	
5	Brest (res)	26	12	5	9	38	34	+4	41	
6	Plabennec	26	10	10	6	31	25	+6	40	
7	Pontivy	26	11	5	10	34	36	−2	38	
8	Plouzané	26	8	8	10	25	33	−8	32	
9	TA Rennes	26	8	6	12	34	40	−6	30	
10	Stade Pontivyen	26	7	7	12	18	26	−8	28	
11	Fougères	26	8	2	16	29	52	−23	26	
12	Lannion	26	7	3	16	41	58	−17	24	
13	Montagnarde (R)	26	6	5	15	20	39	−19	23	Relegation to Regional 1
14	Atlantique Vilaine (R)	26	3	5	18	28	57	−29	14	Relegation to Regional 1

Source: Ligue Bretagne de Football
Rules for classification: 1) points; 2) head-to-head results; 3) head-to-head goal difference; 4) goal difference; 5) number of goals scored; 6) fair play points; 7) draw
(P) Promoted; (R) Relegated

=== Group L: Île-de-France ===
Pos	Team	Pld	W	D	L	GF	GA	GD	Pts	Promotion or relegation
1	Gobelins (P)	26	14	7	5	50	24	+26	49	Promotion to National 2
2	Versailles (Note: Versailles were penalised for fielding a suspended player in the match against Les Ulis on 10 November 2018. The original scoreline was 0–0, and this was retained, however Versailles were awarded a defeat (0 points) and Les Ulis a victory (3 points). Versailles were also deducted a penalty point.)	26	13	7	6	38	26	+12	45	
3	Aubervilliers	26	12	6	8	47	34	+13	42	
4	Racing Club	26	10	11	5	32	26	+6	41	
5	Les Mureaux	26	12	3	11	31	29	+2	39	
6	Paris FC (res)	26	10	8	8	35	29	+6	38	
7	Les Ulis	26	9	10	7	31	28	+3	37	
8	Ivry (Note: Ivry were penalised after an incident in the match at Créteil (res) on 16 December 2018. The match was interrupted, with the scoreline 3–1 in favour of Créteil (res) when the floodlights failed in second half stoppage time. The referee indicated the conditions were good enough to finish the game, but Ivry players refused to continue. Créteil (res) were given a 3–0 victory, and Ivry were deducted a penalty point.)	26	9	8	9	37	31	+6	34	
9	Blanc-Mesnil (Note: Blanc-Mesnil were penalised for fielding a player with an invalid license during the match against Gobelins on 13 April 2019. The original scoreline was 1–1. The revised scoreline is 0–1. This ruling caused Gobelins to be promoted.)	26	9	6	11	30	34	−4	32	
10	Créteil (res)	26	9	5	12	35	42	−7	32	
11	Brétigny (R)	26	7	7	12	15	28	−13	28	Relegation to Regional 1
12	Le Mée (R)	26	7	6	13	24	49	−25	27	Relegation to Regional 1
13	Meaux Academy (R)	26	7	6	13	29	42	−13	27	Relegation to Regional 1
14	Noisy-le-Sec (Note: Noisy-le-Sec were penalised for fielding a suspended player in the match against Le Mée on 1 December 2018. The original scoreline was 3–1. Le Mée were given a 0–1 victory, and Noisy-le-Sec were deducted a penalty point.) (R)	26	7	4	15	23	35	−12	24	Relegation to Regional 1

Source: Ligue de Paris Île-de-France
Rules for classification: 1) points; 2) head-to-head results; 3) head-to-head goal difference; 4) goal difference; 5) number of goals scored; 6) fair play points; 7) draw
(P) Promoted; (R) Relegated

=== Group M: Auvergne-Rhône-Alpes ===
Pos	Team	Pld	W	D	L	GF	GA	GD	Pts	Promotion or relegation
1	Chamalières (P)	26	16	5	5	38	20	+18	53	Promotion to National 2
2	Rumilly-Vallières	26	13	11	2	48	22	+26	50	
3	Ain Sud	26	14	3	9	45	40	+5	45	
4	Aurillac	26	11	9	6	48	32	+16	42	
5	Clermont (res)	26	12	6	8	43	25	+18	42	
6	Limonest	26	12	4	10	40	38	+2	40	
7	Lyon-Duchère (res)	26	10	8	8	35	31	+4	38	
8	Bourgoin-Jallieu	26	10	6	10	31	31	0	36	
9	Vaulx-en-Velin	26	10	6	10	40	41	−1	36	
10	Chambéry	26	9	4	13	36	40	−4	31	
11	Thiers	26	7	7	12	34	42	−8	28	
12	Montluçon	26	7	7	12	36	35	+1	28	
13	Moulins (R)	26	4	7	15	21	49	−28	19	Relegation to Regional 1
14	Ytrac (R)	26	3	5	18	18	67	−49	14	Relegation to Regional 1

Source: Ligue Auvergne-Rhône-Alpes de Football
Rules for classification: 1) points; 2) head-to-head results; 3) head-to-head goal difference; 4) goal difference; 5) number of goals scored; 6) fair play points; 7) draw
(P) Promoted; (R) Relegated

== Season outcomes ==
=== Promotion ===
Angoulême, Angers (res), Bourges Foot, SC Bastia, Louhans-Cuiseaux, Mulhouse, Montpellier (res), Saint-Quentin, Rouen, Guingamp (res), Gobelins and Chamalières finished in the promotion places, and were promoted to 2019–20 Championnat National 2, subject to ratification by the FFF.

On 12 June 2019, the financial regulator of the FFF, the DNCG denied Mulhouse promotion, subject to appeal. The decision was successfully appealed, and Mulhouse were promoted.

=== Champions ===
The title of Champion of Championnat National 3 is awarded to the team with the best record in games against the teams that finished in 2nd to 6th place in their group, with goal difference to separate ties.

Pos	Team	Pts	GD
1	Saint-Quentin	22	15
2	Montpellier (res)	22	13
3	SC Bastia	21	16
4	Rouen	20	9
5	Angoulême	20	5
6	Mulhouse	18	5
7	Angers (res)	17	7
8	Bourges Foot	17	6
9	Dijon (res)	17	6
10	Chamalières	17	3
11	Gobelins	16	7
12	Guingamp (res)	15	5

Saint-Quentin are Champions of 2018–19 Championnat National 3.

=== Relegation ===
Pau (res), Cestas, Montmorillon, Chauray, Laval (res), La Suze, Amilly, Saint-Jean-le-Blanc, Cannet, Le Pontet, ÉF Bastia, AS Saint-Rémy, La Charité, Avallon, Grandvillars, Sarreguemines, Nancy (res), Épernay, Agde, Lozère, Tarbes, Senlis, Dunkerque (res), Tourcoing, Chantilly, ASPTT Caen, Bayeux, Déville-Maromme, Montagnarde, Atlantique Vilaine, Brétigny, Le Mée, Meaux Academy, Noisy-le-Sec, Moulins and Ytrac finished in the relegation places and were relegated to the top division of their respective regional leagues, subject to any reprieves detailed in the next section.

=== Reprieves ===
In Group D, Bastelicaccia were reprieved due to the reprieve of Monaco (res) in 2018–19 Championnat National 2, caused by the decision of Paris Saint-Germain (res) not to participate next season. Subsequently, on 11 July 2019, they were re-relegated as a result of the relegation of Athlético Marseille from 2018–Championnat National 2.

In Group H, Agde were reprieved due to the reprieve of Nîmes (res) in Championnat National 2, caused by the administrative relegation of Tours FC to Championnat National 3 (where they will take the place of their reserve team).

In Group F, Sarreguemines were reprieved due to the reprieve of Haguenau in Championnat National 2, caused by the administrative relegation of Athlético Marseille.

In Group B, Laval (res) were reprieved due to the administrative relegation of Saint-Nazaire.

In Group A, Pau (res) were reprieved due to the administrative relegation of Limoges.

== Top scorers ==
As of end of season.

Rank	Player	Club	Goals
1	(Senegal) Ibrahima Keita	Bourges Foot	27
2	(France) Anthony Janeszko	Grande-Synthe	22
3	(France) Omar Konté	Évreux	21
4	(France) Anthony Vermet	Dinan-Léhon	19
4	(France) Souleymane Anne	Aurillac	19
6	(France) Carnejy Antoine	Saint-Jean-le-Blanc	18
6	(France) Quissumgo Maconda M'Buta	Montluçon	18
6	(São Tomé and Príncipe) Jony Ramos	Gobelins	18
6	(France) Alexis Ebrard	Saint-Colomban Locminé	18
6	(France) Ivann Botella	RC Strasbourg (res)	18
