= Valentin Rabouille =

French footballer (born 2000)

Personal information
- Date of birth: 15 April 2000 (age 26)
- Place of birth: Belfort, France
- Height: 1.87 m (6 ft 2 in)
- Position: Goalkeeper

Team information
- Current team: Bourges

Youth career
- Nîmes

Senior career*
Years	Team	Apps	(Gls)
2017–2020	Nîmes II	26	(0)
2017–2019	Nîmes	0	(0)
2020–2021	Hyères	3	(0)
2021–2022	Muret	10	(0)
2022–2023	Cholet	8	(0)
2023–2024	Beauvais	28	(0)
2025–2026	Red Star	0	(0)
2026–	Bourges	0	(0)
- * Club domestic league appearances and goals as of 3 January 2026

Valentin Rabouille (born 15 April 2000) is a French professional footballer who plays as a goalkeeper for Championnat National 1 club Bourges.

== Career ==
Rabouille made his professional debut with Nîmes in a 3–0 Coupe de la Ligue win over Lens on 29 October 2019. However, his senior debut had come almost two years prior, as he played in a 3–1 Coupe de France win over SC Anduzien on 3 December 2017.

On 23 September 2020, Rabouille signed for Championnat National 2 club Hyères. On 27 January 2022, he signed for Championnat National club Cholet.

On 29 January 2025, Rabouille joined Red Star in Ligue 2.
