= Bourges Foot 18 =

Football club in Bourges, France

Bourges
- Founded: 18 May 2021; 5 years ago
- Ground: Stade Jacques Rimbault
- Capacity: 7,500
- Owner: Sadio Mané
- Co-presidents: Olivier Rigolet; Cheikh Sylla
- Head Coach: Laurent Di Bernardo
- League: National 2 Group B
- 2022–23: National 2 Group D, 8th of 16
- Website: https://www.bourgesfc.fr/
Home colours	Away colours

Bourges Foot 18 (French: [buʁʒ]) is a football club located in Bourges, France. It was created as a result of the merger between Bourges Foot and Bourges 18 in 2021.

== History ==
In July 2020, the merger of the two most significant football clubs in Bourges, Bourges 18 and Bourges Foot, was proposed by mayor Yann Galut. The merger was agreed in principle between the two clubs in September 2020.

Details of the merger were confirmed in April 2021, when the membership of the two constituent clubs voted to approve it. Presidents of the merged clubs would become co-presidents of the new club, called Bourges Foot 18. The club would field its first team in Championnat National 2 (where both constituent teams had last played) and a second team in Championnat National 3. The women's first team would play in Régional 1 Feminine. The club colours would be red and white.

On 5 May 2021, the club confirmed Laurent Di Bernardo, former coach of Bourges Foot, as its head coach.

On 25 October 2023, Bourges was bought by Senegalese international footballer Sadio Mané.

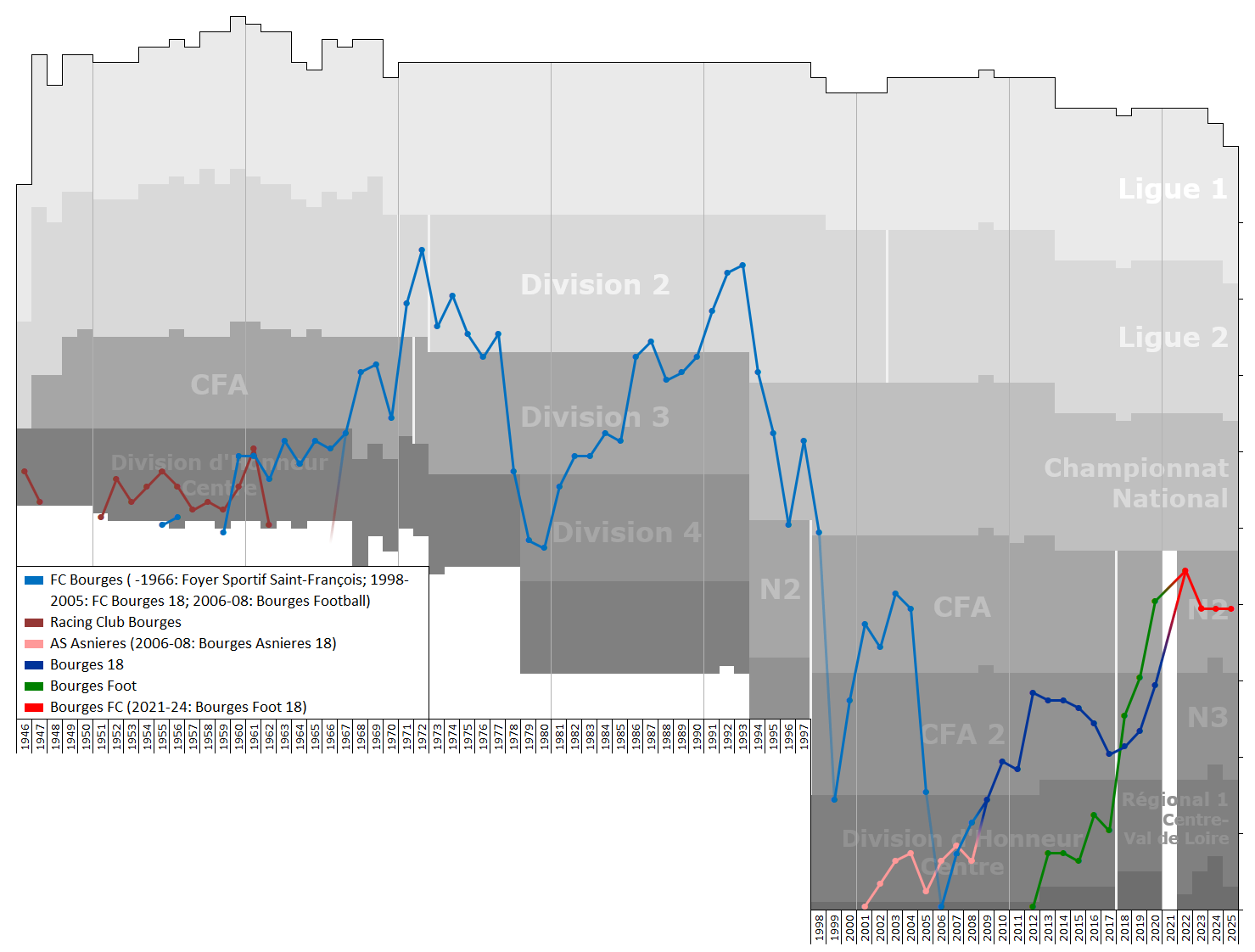
Historical league performance chart of Bourges football clubs

== Squad ==
As of 10 April, 2026

Note: Flags indicate national team as defined under FIFA eligibility rules; some limited exceptions apply. Players may hold more than one non-FIFA nationality.

No.	Pos.	Nation	Player
1	GK	FRA	Léopold Maitre
3	DF	MTQ	Florian Lapis
5	MF	MLI	Abdoulaye Baradji
6	MF	SEN	Ibou Faye
7	FW	FRA	Yaya Soumaré
8	MF	FRA	Alexis Mané
10	MF	FRA	Julien Charpentier
11	FW	FRA	El Hadj Coly
12	MF	SEN	Mayoro N'Doye
14	MF	SEN	Mamadou Massaly

No.	Pos.	Nation	Player
15	DF	FRA	Enzo Couto
16	GK	FRA	El Nasry Mistoihi
17	FW	TOG	Guillaume Yenoussi
20	MF	CPV	Kelvin Patrick
21	DF	MRI	Rosario Latouchent
22	DF	FRA	Paul Mbelek
23	DF	MLI	Sekou Traoré
24	FW	GAB	Gaëtan Missi Mezu
28	FW	BFA	Hamed Belem
29	MF	COD	Christian Nsundi
40	GK	FRA	Valentin Rabouille

In August 2026, Bourges FC signed Beninese goalkeeper Dava David Agossa from Stade Beaucairois 30.
