= Stade Jacques Rimbault =

Football stadium in Bourges, France

- Interactive map of Stade Jacques Rimbault
- Former names: Stade des Grosses Plantes (1991–1993)
- Location: Chemin des Grosses Plantes; 18000 Bourges, Centre-Val de Loire, France
- Coordinates: 47°06′57.9″N 2°23′44.0″E
- Owner: City of Bourges
- Capacity: 13,000 (7,500 seated)
- Record attendance: 8,187 (Bourges Foot vs Lyon, 5 January 2019)

Construction
- Opened: 29 June 1991
- Construction cost: 58 million FRF (1986)

Tenants
- Bourges 18 (1991–2021); Bourges Foot (–2021); Bourges Foot 18 (2021–present)

The Stade Jacques Rimbault is a football stadium located in Bourges, France. It is the home ground of Championnat National 1 club Bourges Foot 18.

Opened in 1991, the stadium was initially called the Stade des Grosses Plantes before being renamed after Jacques Rimbault, the mayor of Bourges who died in 1993.

== Notable matches ==
The Stade Jacques Rimbault hosted all professional Division 2 home fixtures of FC Bourges during the 1993–94 season.

The stadium notably hosted a match between the France U21 and Estonia U21 national teams on 27 May 2009, the game ending in a 3–0 victory for the French. The final of the 2011–12 Coupe de France Féminine was also hosted here, when Lyon beat Montpellier by a score of 2–1. Lastly, the semi-finals of the 2016–17 Coupe Gambardella took place at the stadium, which was a neutral venue.
