= 2019–20 Coupe de France preliminary rounds, Pays de la Loire =

Association football competition

The 2019–20 Coupe de France preliminary rounds, Pays de la Loire was the qualifying competition to decide which teams from the leagues of the Pays de la Loire region of France took part in the main competition from the seventh round.

A total of eleven teams qualified from the Pays de la Loire preliminary rounds. In 2018–19, Les Herbiers VF progressed furthest in the main competition, reaching the round of 32 before losing FC Villefranche.

== Schedule ==
The first two rounds of the qualifying competition took place on the weekends of 25 August and 1 September 2019. 438 teams entered in the first round, comprising 353 from the district leagues (tier 9 and below) and 85 teams from Régional 3 (tier 8). The remaining 11 teams from Régional 3 were exempted to the second round, joining at that stage along with the 38 from Régional 2 (tier 7).

The third round draw took place on 4 September 2019. The 21 teams from Régional 1 (tier 6) and the 11 teams from Championnat National 3 (tier 5) entered at this stage.

The fourth round draw took place on 18 September 2019. The single team from Championnat National 2 (tier 4) entered at this stage, and 42 ties were drawn.

The fifth round draw took place on 2 October 2019. The two teams from Championnat National (tier 3) entered at this stage, and 22 ties were drawn.

The sixth round draw took place on 16 October 2019. 11 ties were drawn.

=== First round ===
These matches were played on 25 August 2019, with one rescheduled for 8 September 2019.

First round results: Pays de la Loire
Tie no	Home team (tier)	Score	Away team (tier)
1.	AS Jean-d'Assé (10)	5–0	FC Charnie (11)
2.	AS Montmirail-Melleray (10)	4–2	AS Ruaudin (9)
3.	US Alpes Mancelles (10)	2–3	US Pays de Juhel (8)
4.	La Vigilante Mayet (8)	0–1	JS Parigné-l'Évêque (9)
5.	AS Neuville-sur-Sarthe (10)	1–3	EG Rouillon (8)
6.	AG Laigné (9)	2–3	Jeunes d'Erbray (9)
7.	Dollon Omnisports (10)	2–0	US Bouloire (9)
8.	SC Ballon (11)	0–3	CO Cormes (10)
9.	AS Loigné-sur-Mayenne (10)	1–4	St Vincent LUSTVI (10)
10.	ES Cherré (10)	0–4	US St Mars-la-Brière (9)
11.	US Villaines-Malicorne (10)	6–1	FC Ménil (11)
12.	US St Aubin-des-Châteaux (11)	0–3	FC Château-Gontier (8)
13.	US Les Epesses-St Mars (10)	1–2	FC Fief Gesté (9)
14.	Gaubretière-St Martin FC (10)	1–1 (0–3 p)	JF Cholet (9)
15.	Val de Sèvre Football (10)	1–3	Energie Le May-sur-Èvre (9)
16.	ARC Tillières (11)	2–6	US Bazoges Beaurepaire (10)
17.	St Martin Treize Septiers (11)	4–2	ES La Romagne-Roussay (10)
18.	FC Val de Moine (10)	5–2	FC Sud Sèvre et Maine (9)
19.	Bé-Léger FC (10)	6–1	AS Landais (10)
20.	St Pierre Mazières (9)	0–2	FC Beaupréau La Chapelle (8)
21.	ES Montilliers (9)	2–2 (7–6 p)	EA La Tessoualle (8)
22.	ES La Copechagnière (9)	3–3 (4–3 p)	AS Le-Puy-St Bonnet (9)
23.	FC Meilleraie-Montournais-Menomblet (10)	2–1	AS Longeron-Torfou (9)
24.	FF Mortagne-sur-Sèvre (10)	0–3	US Toutlemonde Maulévrier (9)
25.	SomloirYzernay CPF (8)	2–0	ASPTT-CAEB Cholet (8)
26.	Christophe-Séguinière (8)	0–2	FC Mouchamps-Rochetrejoux (8)
27.	Flochamont-sur-Sèvre FC (8)	1–4	FC Portugais Cholet (8)
28.	Olympique Sal-Tour Vézins Coron (10)	1–3	FC St Laurent Malvent (9)
29.	St Georges Trémentines FC (9)	2–2 (4–5 p)	RC Doué-la-Fontaine (8)
30.	ES Val Baugeois (12)	4–0	AS Vaas (10)
31.	AG Champigné-Querré (11)	5–0	US Chantenay-Villedieu (10)
32.	AS Juigné-sur-Sarthe (9)	5–0	JG Coudray (9)
33.	JS Ludoise (10)	0–2	US Beaufort-en-Vallée (8)
34.	ASPTT Le Mans (9)	1–2	La Patriote Bonnétable (8)
35.	AS Étival (10)	3–0 (Note: Tie won by means of forfeit.)	AS Thorigné-sur-Dué (10)
36.	Anille Braye Foot (10)	1–6	US Vibraysienne (9)
37.	ES Champfleur (10)	2–5	Beaumont SA (8)
38.	FC La Pouëze/St Clement-de-la-Place/Brain (10)	0–1	Abbaretz-Saffré FC (11)
39.	Pin Sulpice Vritz FC (12)	2–1	FC Castelvarennais (11)
40.	Le Cellier Mauves FC (10)	0–1 (a.e.t.)	Olympique Bécon-Villemoisan-St Augustin (8)
41.	BoupèreMonProuant FC (9)	3–2	AS St Hilaire-Vihiers-St Paul (8)
42.	FC Villedieu-La Renaudière (12)	0–2	ES Vallet (10)
43.	US Crosmièroise (10)	1–7	FC Pellouailles-Corze (8)
44.	AS Bouchamps-lès-Craon (12)	0–8	ES Rougé (11)
45.	Anjou Baconne FC (11)	2–2 {(1–3 p)	AS Chemazé (10)
46.	ES Quelainaise (10)	1–0	US Combrée-Bel-Air-Noyant (10)
47.	SC Ste Gemmes-d'Andigné (10)	5–0	US Laval (8)
48.	US Renazé (11)	2–7	USA Pouancé (8)
49.	ES Belligné-Chapelle-Maumusson (10)	5–3	AS Avrillé (10)
50.	AS Mésanger (11)	2–0	AS Lac de Maine (9)
51.	Étoile du Don Moisdon-Meilleraye (10)	0–2	Pomjeannais JA (9)
52.	Olympique Liré-Drain (9)	2–1	Hirondelle Football (8)
53.	Les Touches FC (11)	3–4	FC Laurentais Landemontais (9)
54.	Andrezé-Jub-Jallais FC (9)	4–0 (Note: Tie reversed with agreement of both clubs.)	Herblanetz FC (11)
55.	FC Fuilet-Chaussaire (10)	5–1	FC Oudon-Couffé (10)
56.	AS Salle-Aubry-Poitevinière (11)	0–1	Landreau-Loroux OSC (9)
57.	USJA St Martin-Aviré-Louvaine (11)	1–6	JA St Mars-du-Désert (9)
58.	CAS Possosavennières (9)	1–1 (4–5 p)	UC Auvers-Poillé (8)
59.	JS Solesmienne (8)	2–3	AS St Sylvain-d'Anjou (9)
60.	AC Longué (11)	0–1	US Bazouges-Cré (8)
61.	ES Morannes (10)	2–4	SS Noyen-sur-Sarthe (8)
62.	ASVR Ambillou-Château (11)	7–0	FC St Lambert-St Jean-St Léger-St Martin (11)
63.	Aiglons Durtalois (11)	1–4	US Roézé (9)
64.	AS Clermont-Créans (10)	4–0	ES Gennes-Les Rosiers (11)
65.	US Marans-Gené (11)	4–1	ES Pommerieux (10)
66.	FC La Selle-Craonnaise (10)	1–8	AS Écouflant (10)
67.	AS St Pierre Angrie (11)	1–3	AS Meslay-du-Maine (8)
68.	CF Châtelais-Nyoiseau-Bouillé-Grugé (11)	0–2	US St Pierre-la-Cour (8)
69.	FC Loulaysien (11)	0–1	FC Brainnois-Boisséen (9)
70.	US Ferrièroise (11)	4–1	Etoile du Bocage (10)
71.	ES des Marais (9)	2–4 (a.e.t.)	FC Bouaine Rocheservière (10)
72.	US Suplice André Mormaison (10)	1–2 (a.e.t.)	Legé FC (10)
73.	ES du Lac (10)	1–5	St Michel SF (10)
74.	AS Sud Loire (10)	0–1	AS Boufféré (8)
75.	SC Angevin (10)	1–7	AS Seiches-sur-le-Loire-Marcé (8)
76.	CS Lion d'Angers (10)	4–3	Intrépide Angers Foot (8)
77.	FC Longuenée-en-Anjou (10)	0–4	Montreuil-Juigné Béné Football (8)
78.	Croix Blanche Angers (8)	1–2	Football Chalonnes-Chaudefonds (8)
79.	ES Andard-Brain (8)	1–0	US Cantenay-Épinard (8)
80.	AS Val-d'Erdre-Auxence (11)	3–2	FC Bout' Loire-et-Evre (11)
81.	Mon Atout FC Angévin (13)	1–3 (Note: Match not originally played, and rearranged for a later date by order of the league committee.)	FC Villevêque-Soucelles (11)
82.	Sporting Sud Loire (13)	0–1	RS Teiphalien Tiffauges (11)
83.	US Mazé (10)	2–1	ÉS Trélazé (9)
84,	SO Candé-Challain-Loiré (10)	1–1 (1–3 p)	Réveil St Géréon (10)
85.	FC Entente du Vignoble (10)	0–3	St André-St Macaire FC (8)
86.	FC Gétigné-Boussay (10)	2–2 (2–4 p)	Vigilante St Fulgent (8)
87.	Héric FC (10)	2–1	FC Chabossière (9)
88.	ES Pornichet (8)	2–0	AS La Madeleine (9)
89.	Ste Reine-Crossac Football (9)	1–0	Nort ACF (8)
90.	Espérance Campbon (10)	1–2	FC Mouzeil-Teillé-Ligné (8)
91.	AOS Pontchâteau (9)	2–3	Alerte de Méan (10)
92.	US Thouaré (9)	3–1	Nozay OS (10)
93.	FC Trois Rivières (10)	4–0	ES Dresny-Plessé (9)
94.	Étoile du Cens Nantes (13)	0–4	Nantes Sud 98 (10)
95.	ES Vertou (10)	0–2	FC La Montagne (8)
96.	ACS Dervallières Nantes (10)	0–3	JGE Sucé-sur-Erdre (8)
97.	St Cyr Foot Herbignac (10)	2–1	La Malouine Football (8)
98.	Étoile Mouzillon Foot (11)	2–3	US Chauché (8)
99.	AS Maine (10)	2–0	St Georges Guyonnière FC (9)
100.	FC Logne et Boulogne (11)	0–2	US Bernardière-Cugand (9)
101.	Degré FC (11)	3–0	US Tennie-St Symphorien (10)
102.	AS Noyantais (11)	2–4	FC Val du Loir (9)
103.	EA Baugeois (10)	0–2	CO Castélorien (9)
104.	FS Champgenéteux (11)	1–5	US Conlie (9)
105.	AS Châtres-la-Forêt (11)	3–4	CA Loué (8)
106.	Internationale du Mans (11)	5–1	Lombron Sports (10)
107.	ES Montfort-le-Gesnois (10)	1–1 (3–5 p)	AS La Chapelle-St-Aubin (8)
108.	US La Chapelle-d'Aligné (11)	0–1	AS Chazé-Vern (10)
109.	Herbadilla Foot (11)	1–1 (3–1 p)	AS Bruffière Defontaine (10)
110.	US Vital Frossay (11)	0–2	AFC Bouin-Bois-de-Céné-Châteauneuf (11)
111.	Bouguenais Football (10)	4–0	Hirondelles Soullandaises (11)
112.	Bernerie OCA (12)	3–2	EM Sallertaine (11)
113.	AS Riezaise (12)	0–4	FC Bourgneuf-en-Retz (11)
114.	Étoile de Vie Le Fenouiller (9)	1–3	Alliance Sud-Retz Machecoul (8)
115.	St Médard St Mars-de-Coutais (12)	1–1 (3–1 p)	AF Apremont-La Chapelle (11)
116.	FC Noirmoutier (10)	0–5	St Pierre de Retz (8)
117.	USM Beauvoir-sur-Mer (10)	2–1	FC Retz (8)
118.	Eclair de Chauvé (11)	0–4	ES Marsouins Brétignolles-Brem (8)
119.	Goélands Sammaritains (11)	1–4	Écureils des Pays de Monts (8)
120.	AS St Gervais (11)	0–1	Arche FC (11)
121.	FC Falleron-Froidfond (11)	1–0	US Pellerinaise (11)
122.	FC Joué-l'Abbé-La Guierche (11)	0–2	US Savigné-l'Évêque (10)
123.	US St Ouen-St Biez (10)	0–5	US Mansigné (8)
124.	FC Louplande (10)	0–7	JS Allonnes (8)
125.	AS Sargéenne (10)	1–4	US Guécélard (8)
126.	ES Yvré-l'Évêque (9)	6–3	FC St Georges-Pruillé (10)
127.	US Challes (10)	1–4	US La Chapelle-St Rémy (9)
128.	FC Marginé-Laillé (11)	0–7	CO Laigné-St Gervais (10)
129.	AS St Pavace (10)	3–2	FC La Bazoge (9)
130.	ES Daguenière Bohalle (12)	3–2	ES Le Puy-Vaudelnay (11)
131.	USC Corné (11)	1–4	Angers Cœur d'Afrique (11)
132.	ES Loire et Louet (12)	1–0 (a.e.t.)	FC Louet-Juignéen (11)
133.	St Melaine OS (11)	3–1	US St Georges-sur-Loire (11)
134.	UF Allonnes-Brain-sur-Allonnes (11)	5–4	ASR Vernantes-Vernoil (10)
135.	ES Auverse-Mouliherne-Chavaignes-Lasse (10)	1–0	Club du Haut Layon (11)
136.	ASC St Barthélémy-d'Anjou (11)	4–2	Union St Leger-St Germain-Champtocé Avenir (10)
137.	Ste Christine-Bourgneuf FC (11)	3–2	Doutre SC (10)
138.	Olympique Ste Gemmes-sur-Loire (10)	0–2	US Varades (8)
139.	FC Layon (10)	1–4	Olympique Chemillé-Melay (8)
140.	AS Valanjou (10)	0–2	AS Bayard-Saumur (8)
141.	Petit-Mars FC (10)	7–0	FC Atlantique Morbihan (11)
142.	La Panafricaine FC (11)	2–1	ES Notre-Dame-des-Landes (11)
143.	Stade Couëronnais FC (11)	0–3 (a.e.t.)	Métallo Sport Chantenaysien (10)
144.	St Joseph de Porterie Nantes (11)	1–6	ES Haute Goulaine (9)
145.	Don Bosco Football Nantes (12)	3–7 (a.e.t.)	FC Fay Bouvron (10)
146.	FC Stephanois (11)	4–2 (a.e.t.)	US Basse Indre (12)
147.	CCS Nantes St Félix (12)	1–4	Temple Cordemais FC (11)
148.	St Herblain OC (10)	0–2	ES Vigneux (8)
149.	SC Nord Atlantique (9)	1–0	ES Craon (8)
150.	AS Guillaumois (11)	3–1	FC Mesquerais (12)
151.	FC Côte Sauvage (11)	0–2	St Marc Football (9)
152.	FC Mesnilaurentais (11)	2–3	St Mars SF Vallons de l'Erdre (11)
153.	US Bugallière Orvault (12)	3–10	FC Toutes Aides Nantes (10)
154.	AS Grandchamp Foot (11)	1–5	AS Marsacais (9)
155.	St Joachim Brière Sports (9)	2–5	Donges FC (10)
156.	Océane FC (9)	1–2	FC Bouaye (8)
157.	FC Côteaux du Vignoble (8)	1–2	Nantes Pin Sec FC (9)
158.	Orvault RC (10)	0–2	AEPR Rezé (8)
159.	Amicale St Lyphard (11)	1–6	FC Guémené-Massérac (9)
160.	FC Presqu'île Vilaine (11)	2–3	La Saint André (9)
161.	ES Maritime (9)	4–1	FC Immaculée (8)
162.	FC La Chapelle-des-Marais (8)	2–1	CS Montoirin (9)
163.	Sympho Foot Treillières (9)	3–0	Nantes St Pierre (8)
164.	SC Avessac-Fégréac (8)	0–2	Savenay-Malville FC (9)
165.	Nantes La Mellinet (9)	1–7	Élan de Gorges Foot (8)
166.	FC Montjean (10)	2–4	US Chantrigné (10)
167.	FC Ambrières (10)	1–6	Gorron FC (8)
168.	US Parigné-sur-Braye (11)	0–5	FC Lassay (9)
169.	US Le Genest (9)	0–4	ASPTT Laval (10)
170.	AS Ballée (10)	2–3	US Dionysienne (9)
171.	FA Laval (10)	3–4	AS Le Bourgneuf-la-Forêt (9)
172.	AS Vaiges (10)	1–3	US Forcé (8)
173.	US La Bigottière-Alexain (10)	0–3	AS Contest-St Baudelle (8)
174.	Nuillé Sport (10)	3–2	Alerte Ahuillé FC (9)
175.	AS Brée (11)	2–1	US Aronnaise (9)
176.	CS St Pierre-des-Landes (10)	4–0	FC Landivy-Pontmain (11)
177.	US Fougerolles-du-Plessis (8)	3–2	AS Andouillé (9)
178.	Voltigeurs St Georges-Buttavent (9)	1–5	US Réunion Laval (10)
179.	US Argentré (9)	5–0	FC Ruillé-Loiron (10)
180.	US Simplé-Marigné-Peuton (11)	0–4	USC Pays de Montsûrs (9)
181.	AS Martigné-sur-Mayenne (10)	2–5	JA Soulgé-sur-Ouette (9)
182.	AS La Baconnière (10)	1–9	Hermine St Ouennaise (8)
183.	Larchamp-Montaudin FC (10)	0–2	ES Beaulieu-sur-Oudon (10)
184.	US Villiers-Charlemagne (10)	2–1	US St Jean-sur-Mayenne (10)
185.	Association Cuillé-St Poix (11)	1–5	US Entrammes (8)
186.	Brecé Sports (11)	1–4	US St Germain-le-Fouilloux (10)
187.	US Athée (11)	2–3	ASL L'Huisserie Foot (8)
188.	CA Voutréen (10)	0–3	FC Pays de Sillé (9)
189.	CS Javron-Neuilly (10)	1–2	ASO Montenay (10)
190.	US Cigné (9)	0–3	US Pré-en-Pail (10)
191.	Coëx Olympique (10)	4–0	FC Saligny (9)
192.	Beaulieu SF (11)	0–3	US Aubigny (8)
193.	JA Nesmy (11)	1–1 (2–4 p)	Loups Sportifs Ste Flaive-des-Loups (10)
194.	St Gilles-St Hilaire FC (11)	1–1 (3–1 p)	FC Talmondais (10)
195.	US Bournezeau-St Hilaire (10)	4–1	St Pierre Sportif Nieul-le-Dolent (10)
196.	AS St Maixent-sur-Vie (10)	1–3	Ste Foy FC (10)
197.	AS Graonnaise (10)	0–1	FC Achards (8)
198.	FC Grand Lieu (9)	1–0	FC Chavagnes-La Rabatelière (9)
199.	ES Belleville-sur-Vie (10)	2–1	RS Ardelay (9)
200.	RS Les Clouzeaux (11)	0–2	Commequiers SF (10)
201.	US Mesnard-Vendrennes (10)	0–2	FC Mouilleron-Thouarsais-Caillère (8)
202.	SO Fougeré-Thorigny (12)	1–4	ES St Denis-la-Chevasse (9)
203.	SA St Florent-des-Bois (10)	3–2	US Bequots-Lucquois (8)
204.	FC Givrand l'Aiguillon (11)	0–2	FC Généraudière Roche Sud (10)
205.	JF Boissière-des-Landes (10)	1–1 (5–4 p)	La Chaize FEC (8)
206.	Les Farfadets St Paul-en-Pareds (11)	0–4	FC Nieul-Maillezais-Les Autises (9)
207.	USE Dompierroise (10)	1–0	FC St Julien-Vairé (8)
208.	FC St Philbert-Réorthe-Jaudonnière (11)	2–2 (2–4 p)	FC Robretières La Roche-sur-Yon (8)
209.	US Herminoise (11)	1–0	Sud Vendée Football (9)
210.	ES Pineaux (11)	1–3	Entente Sud Vendée (10)
211.	US Michelaise et Triolaise (11)	1–4	Pays de Chantonnay Foot (8)
212.	US Autize Vendée (10)	1–3	Entente Cheffois-Antigny-St Maurice (8)
213.	AS Landevieille (11)	0–2	FC Jard-Avrillé (9)
214.	SSJA St Mathurin (12)	0–2	FC La Génétouze (9)
215.	Foot Espoir 85 (10)	1–0	ES Grosbreuil (9)
216.	FC Cantonal Sud Vendée (10)	0–2	ES Côte de Lumière (9)
217.	FC Plaine et Bocage (8)	3–0	AS Dom-Tom (10)
218.	ES Longevillaise (11)	1–1 (2–3 p)	Hermitage Venansault (10)
219.	AS Quatre Vents Fontaines (11)	1–2	AS Moutiers-St Avaugourd (11)

=== Second round ===
These matches were played on 1 September 2019, with one match delayed until 15 September 2019.

Second round results: Pays de la Loire
Tie no	Home team (tier)	Score	Away team (tier)
1.	AS St Pavace (10)	0–2	SA Mamertins (7)
2.	US Savigné-l'Évêque (10)	1–3	Beaumont SA (8)
3.	US Bazouges-Cré (8)	2–1	FE Trélazé (7)
4.	US Pré-en-Pail (10)	4–3 (3–2 p)	AS Jean-d'Assé (10)
5.	CA Loué (8)	0–1	US Argentré (9)
6.	USC Pays de Montsûrs (9)	0–4	AS Le Mans Villaret (7)
7.	ES Côte de Lumière (9)	0–2	Mouilleron SF (7)
8.	FC Nieul-Maillezais-Les Autises (9)	1–3	US Aubigny (8)
9.	FC Pays de Sillé (9)	3–1	FC Lassay (9)
10.	UC Auvers-Poillé (8)	1–5	Ernéenne Foot (7)
11.	Entente Sud Vendée (10)	0–2	FC Robretières La Roche-sur-Yon (8)
12.	Entente Cheffois-Antigny-St Maurice (8)	0–2	Luçon FC (7)
13.	ES Quelainaise (10)	1–5	SS Noyen-sur-Sarthe (8)
14.	JS Parigné-l'Évêque (9)	2–1 (Note: JS Parigné-l'Évêque penalised for fielding a suspended player. Dollon Omnisports qualify.)	Dollon Omnisports (10)
15.	AS Écouflant (10)	3–1	AS Juigné-sur-Sarthe (9)
16.	FC Bouaine Rocheservière (10)	0–2	FC Achards (8)
17.	Abbaretz-Saffré FC (11)	2–0	ES Beaulieu-sur-Oudon (10)
18.	Jeunes d'Erbray (9)	3–0	US Méral-Cossé (7)
19.	ES Rougé (11)	3–4	Nuillé Sport (10)
20.	US Dionysienne (9)	2–4	AS Tiercé-Cheffes (8)
21.	St Martin Treize Septiers (11)	0–5	JF Cholet (9)
22.	US Toutlemonde Maulévrier (9)	1–3	FC Meilleraie-Montournais-Menomblet (10)
23.	FC Mouchamps-Rochetrejoux (8)	0–1	AS St Pierre-Montrevault (7)
24.	FC Beaupréau La Chapelle (8)	2–1	Pays de Chantonnay Foot (8)
25.	Vigilante St Fulgent (8)	1–6	Olympique Chemillé-Melay (8)
26.	AG Champigné-Querré (11)	2–3	US Villaines-Malicorne (10)
27.	AS St Sylvain-d'Anjou (9)	5–1	AS Clermont-Créans (10)
28.	BoupèreMonProuant FC (9)	2–1	Foot Espoir 85 (10)
29.	Ste Foy FC (10)	0–5	FC Plaine et Bocage (8)
30.	St Médard St Mars-de-Coutais (12)	0–2	St Gilles-St Hilaire FC (11)
31.	Écureils des Pays de Monts (8)	2–1	Pornic Foot (7)
32.	Legé FC (10)	2–3	USM Beauvoir-sur-Mer (10)
33.	St Pierre de Retz (8)	0–1	'LSG Les Brouzils (7)
34.	US Chauché (8)	2–0	AS Vieillevigne-La Planche (7)
35.	FC Montaigu 85 (7)	0–1	Élan de Gorges Foot (8)
36.	AFC Bouin-Bois-de-Céné-Châteauneuf (11)	2–1	Bernerie OCA (12)
37.	AS Boufféré (8)	1–2 (a.e.t.)	Etoile de Clisson (7)
38.	FC Bourgneuf-en-Retz (11)	1–1 (3–5 p)	FC Falleron-Froidfond (11)
39.	US Conlie (9)	3–5	US Pays de Juhel (8)
40.	Internationale du Mans (11)	3–2 (Note: Internationale du Mans penalised for fielding too many transferred players. US Vibraysienne qualify.)	US Vibraysienne (9)
41.	AS Val-d'Erdre-Auxence (11)	0–2	ES Moncé (8)
42.	Donges FC (10)	5–2	Nantes Sud 98 (10)
43.	CO Castélorien (9)	0–3	Écommoy FC (7)
44.	CO Laigné-St Gervais (10)	0–0 (5–6 p)	Degré FC (11)
45.	US La Chapelle-St Rémy (9)	6–2	AS Montmirail-Melleray (10)
46.	CO Cormes (10)	1–4	ES Yvré-l'Évêque (9)
47.	US St Mars-la-Brière (9)	1–2	La Patriote Bonnétable (8)
48.	US Roézé (9)	4–1	AS Étival (10)
49.	US Guécélard (8)	6–0	SO Maine (8)
50.	Loups Sportifs Ste Flaive-des-Loups (10)	3–3 (4–2 p)	FC Cécilien Martinoyen (7)
51.	US Herminoise (11)	0–2	La France d'Aizenay (7)
52.	JS Allonnes (8)	2–0	CO St Saturnin Arche (7)
53.	SA St Florent-des-Bois (10)	0–3	FC Essartais (7)
54.	Hermitage Venansault (10)	0–3	Mareuil SC (7)
55.	US Bazoges Beaurepaire (10)	2–8	FC Olonne Château (7)
56.	FC Guémené-Massérac (9)	1–0	FC Trois Rivières (10)
57.	JA St Mars-du-Désert (9)	0–7	USJA Carquefou (7)
58.	FC Brainnois-Boisséen (9)	2–3 (a.e.t.)	US Lucéene (7)
59.	ES Vigneux (8)	0–3	US La Baule-Le Pouliguen (7)
60.	La Saint André (9)	2–0	ASC St Médard-de-Doulon Nantes (7)
61.	FC Mouzeil-Teillé-Ligné (8)	3–0	Sympho Foot Treillières (9)
62.	US Bernardière-Cugand (9)	0–2	AEPR Rezé (8)
63.	Arche FC (11)	0–0 (4–3 p)	Herbadilla Foot (11)
64.	St Michel SF (10)	7–3	AS Maine (10)
65.	FC La Génétouze (9)	4–0	Alliance Sud-Retz Machecoul (8)
66.	ES Marsouins Brétignolles-Brem (8)	4–0	AC St Brevin (8)
67.	US St Berthevin (8)	3–3 (5–3 p)	US Glonnières (8)
68.	CS Changé (7)	2–1	US Entrammes (8)
69.	US Arnage Pontlieue (8)	1–5	CA Evronnais (7)
70.	AS La Chapelle-St-Aubin (8)	3–0	ASL L'Huisserie Foot (8)
71.	US Mansigné (8)	2–4	US Nautique Spay (7)
72.	US St Germain-le-Fouilloux (10)	2–3	CS St Pierre-des-Landes (10)
73.	US Chantrigné (10)	2–4	Gorron FC (8)
74.	ASO Montenay (10)	2–3	AS Contest-St Baudelle (8)
75.	US Forcé (8)	1–3	ES Bouchemaine (7)
76.	US Réunion Laval (10)	4–1	US Fougerolles-du-Plessis (8)
77.	ASPTT Laval (10)	1–2	SC Ste Gemmes-d'Andigné (10)
78.	FC Château-Gontier (8)	2–1	AL Châteaubriant (8)
79.	AS Le Bourgneuf-la-Forêt (9)	1–3	Louverné Sports (7)
80.	AS Chemazé (10)	1–3	AS Seiches-sur-le-Loire-Marcé (8)
81.	JA Soulgé-sur-Ouette (9)	2–4	Patriote Brulonnaise (7)
82.	AS Brée (11)	0–1	EG Rouillon (8)
83.	FC Généraudière Roche Sud (10)	4–0	Coëx Olympique (10)
84.	ES St Denis-la-Chevasse (9)	1–0	USE Dompierroise (10)
85.	Commequiers SF (10)	3–1	JF Boissière-des-Landes (10)
86.	AS Moutiers-St Avaugourd (11)	1–4	FC Jard-Avrillé (9)
87.	US Bournezeau-St Hilaire (10)	1–0	FC Mouilleron-Thouarsais-Caillère (8)
88.	US Ferrièroise (11)	2–5	ES La Copechagnière (9)
89.	Landreau-Loroux OSC (9)	0–2	AC Basse-Goulaine (7)
90.	ES Belleville-sur-Vie (10)	0–1	Elan Sorinières Football (7)
91.	FC La Montagne (8)	2–0	UF St Herblain (8)
92.	FC Bouaye (8)	0–2	AC Chapelain Foot (7)
93.	FC Fay Bouvron (10)	0–5	ES Maritime (9)
94.	Ste Reine-Crossac Football (9)	0–0 (4–1 p)	ES Blain (8)
95.	ES Pornichet (8)	2–1 (a.e.t.)	St Aubin-Guérande Football (7)
96.	FC Toutes Aides Nantes (10)	0–0 (2–3 p)	AS Guillaumois (11)
97.	Nantes Pin Sec FC (9)	3–2	Héric FC (10)
98.	Métallo Sport Chantenaysien (10)	3–4	La Panafricaine FC (11)
99.	St Marc Football (9)	1–2 (3–4 p)	SC Nord Atlantique (9)
100.	JGE Sucé-sur-Erdre (8)	1–0 (a.e.t.)	FC Grand Lieu (9)
101.	Savenay-Malville FC (9)	1–0	US Thouaré (9)
102.	Bouguenais Football (10)	0–2	Petit-Mars FC (10)
103.	Alerte de Méan (10)	4–0	FC Stephanois (11)
104.	AS Marsacais (9)	1–4	FC La Chapelle-des-Marais (8)
105.	ES Vallet (10)	0–3	St André-St Macaire FC (8)
106.	Angers Cœur d'Afrique (11)	1–2	St Melaine OS (11)
107.	Olympique Bécon-Villemoisan-St Augustin (8)	1–6	US Loire et Divatte (8)
108.	ES Daguenière Bohalle (12)	2–1	ASC St Barthélémy-d'Anjou (11)
109.	RS Teiphalien Tiffauges (11)	2–5	ES Montilliers (9)
110.	ASVR Ambillou-Château (11)	5–4	UF Allonnes-Brain-sur-Allonnes (11)
111.	FC St Laurent Malvent (9)	0–3	FC Portugais Cholet (8)
112.	ES Loire et Louet (12)	0–3	FC Val de Moine (10)
113.	CS Lion d'Angers (10)	1–2	AS Meslay-du-Maine (8)
114.	US Mazé (10)	1–4	FC Pellouailles-Corze (8)
115.	US Marans-Gené (11)	3–2	US Villiers-Charlemagne (10)
116.	AS Bayard-Saumur (8)	1–0	ES Andard-Brain (8)
117.	Football Chalonnes-Chaudefonds (8)	2–1	RC Ancenis 44 (7)
118.	ES Auverse-Mouliherne-Chavaignes-Lasse (10)	1–4	Montreuil-Juigné Béné Football (8)
119.	Réveil St Géréon (10)	3–4 (a.e.t.)	Bé-Léger FC (10)
120.	Energie Le May-sur-Èvre (9)	0–2	RC Doué-la-Fontaine (8)
121.	FC Val du Loir (9)	3–0	ES Belligné-Chapelle-Maumusson (10)
122.	US Beaufort-en-Vallée (8)	2–3 (a.e.t.)	Angers Vaillante Foot (7)
123.	St Mars SF Vallons de l'Erdre (11)	0–3	FC Laurentais Landemontais (9)
124.	Pomjeannais JA (9)	0–1	ASI Mûrs-Erigné (7)
125.	Andrezé-Jub-Jallais FC (9)	1–4	ES Aubance (7)
126.	US Varades (8)	0–2	SomloirYzernay CPF (8)
127.	FC Fief Gesté (9)	4–3 (a.e.t.)	ES Haute Goulaine (9)
128.	USA Pouancé (8)	2–0	Hermine St Ouennaise (8)
129.	AS Mésanger (11)	0–1	FC Fuilet-Chaussaire (10)
130.	AS Chazé-Vern (10)	1–2	US St Pierre-la-Cour (8)
131.	Pin Sulpice Vritz FC (12)	0–12	Ste Christine-Bourgneuf FC (11)
132.	St Vincent LUSTVI (10)	0–2	Olympique Liré-Drain (9)
133.	Temple Cordemais FC (11)	2–4	St Cyr Foot Herbignac (10)
134.	ES Val Baugeois (12)	2–3 (a.e.t.)	FC Villevêque-Soucelles (11)

=== Third round ===
These matches were played on 14 and 15 September 2019, with one match dependent on a late game in the previous round played on 22 September 2019.

Third round results: Pays de la Loire
Tie no	Home team (tier)	Score	Away team (tier)
1.	AS Guillaumois (11)	1–11	Vendée Poiré-sur-Vie Football (6)
2.	Bé-Léger FC (10)	1–4	FC Challans (5)
3.	La France d'Aizenay (7)	0–4	Vendée Fontenay Foot (5)
4.	FC Plaine et Bocage (8)	2–0	Nantes Pin Sec FC (9)
5.	Élan de Gorges Foot (8)	2–0	JSC Bellevue Nantes (6)
6.	AS Contest-St Baudelle (8)	0–1	USA Pouancé (8)
7.	US St Pierre-la-Cour (8)	1–3	ES Bonchamp (6)
8.	ES Daguenière Bohalle (12)	1–2	EG Rouillon (8)
9.	AS St Sylvain-d'Anjou (9)	1–3	Mouilleron SF (7)
10.	SC Ste Gemmes-d'Andigné (10)	1–3	US Loire et Divatte (8)
11.	FC Falleron-Froidfond (11)	1–8	Saint-Nazaire AF (6)
12.	US Lucéene (7)	1–2	Football Chalonnes-Chaudefonds (8)
13.	US Nautique Spay (7)	2–2 (5–4 p)	CS Changé (7)
14.	AS Meslay-du-Maine (8)	0–9	Voltigeurs de Châteaubriant (5)
15.	Arche FC (11)	0–1	BoupèreMonProuant FC (9)
16.	FC Fief Gesté (9)	1–4	ESOF La Roche-sur-Yon (6)
17.	SC Nord Atlantique (9)	0–1	SC Beaucouzé (6)
18.	Degré FC (11)	0–3	US Roézé (9)
19.	FC Mouzeil-Teillé-Ligné (8)	0–3	Orvault SF (6)
20.	La Suze FC (6)	1–2	Etoile de Clisson (7)
21.	La Panafricaine FC (11)	1–1 (3–5 p)	USM Beauvoir-sur-Mer (10)
22.	NDC Angers (6)	4–2	AS La Châtaigneraie (5)
23.	ES Yvré-l'Évêque (9)	1–6	La Flèche RC (5)
24.	Savenay-Malville FC (9)	2–3	USJA Carquefou (7)
25.	VS Fertois (6)	2–2 (4–5 p)	AS Le Mans Villaret (7)
26.	Ste Reine-Crossac Football (9)	0–0 (2–3 p)	ES Marsouins Brétignolles-Brem (8)
27.	US Réunion Laval (10)	0–13	Sablé FC (5)
28.	ASVR Ambillou-Château (11)	6–1	FC La Montagne (8)
29.	Beaumont SA (8)	3–0	FC Val du Loir (9)
30.	St Gilles-St Hilaire FC (11)	0–4	FC Généraudière Roche Sud (10)
31.	FC Château-Gontier (8)	0–4	St Sébastien FC (6)
32.	FC Pellouailles-Corze (8)	2–0	FC Pays de Sillé (9)
33.	AS Écouflant (10)	1–3	AS Bourny Laval (6)
34.	ES La Copechagnière (9)	1–0 (a.e.t.)	Loups Sportifs Ste Flaive-des-Loups (10)
35.	FC Robretières La Roche-sur-Yon (8)	0–4	US La Baule-Le Pouliguen (7)
36.	Olympique Chemillé-Melay (8)	2–1	AS Sautronnaise (6)
37.	SS Noyen-sur-Sarthe (8)	0–2	ASI Mûrs-Erigné (7)
38.	FC Portugais Cholet (8)	2–3	Mareuil SC (7)
39.	US Villaines-Malicorne (10)	1–4	FC Laurentais Landemontais (9)
40.	US La Chapelle-St Rémy (9)	1–4	ES Bouchemaine (7)
41.	Jeunes d'Erbray (9)	4–3	Alerte de Méan (10)
42.	US Vibraysienne (9)	2–0	Ernéenne Foot (7)
43.	CS St Pierre-des-Landes (10)	3–3 (3–5 p)	AS Seiches-sur-le-Loire-Marcé (8)
44.	SA Mamertins (7)	0–0 (3–5 p)	AS Bayard-Saumur (8)
45.	US Marans-Gené (11)	0–4	AC Chapelain Foot (7)
46.	JF Cholet (9)	1–8	USSA Vertou (5)
47.	US Pays de Juhel (8)	1–5	JS Coulaines (6)
48.	St Cyr Foot Herbignac (10)	3–2	Olympique Liré-Drain (9)
49.	ES Moncé (8)	0–2	Olympique Saumur FC (5)
50.	Dollon Omnisports (10)	2–6 (a.e.t.)	Angers Vaillante Foot (7)
51.	FC Jard-Avrillé (9)	0–6	Pouzauges Bocage FC (5)
52.	Elan Sorinières Football (7)	1–0	AEPR Rezé (8)
53.	CA Evronnais (7)	1–6	US Changé (5)
54.	St Michel SF (10)	0–4	FC Beaupréau La Chapelle (8)
55.	ES Maritime (9)	0–2	FC Rezé (6)
56.	FC Guémené-Massérac (9)	1–2	ES Pornichet (8)
57.	US Bournezeau-St Hilaire (10)	0–1	FC Achards (8)
58.	Abbaretz-Saffré FC (11)	1–1 (1–4 p)	US Chauché (8)
59.	Ste Christine-Bourgneuf FC (11)	0–2	FC Olonne Château (7)
60.	FC Fuilet-Chaussaire (10)	0–6	TVEC Les Sables-d'Olonne (6)
61.	Nuillé Sport (10)	1–5	Patriote Brulonnaise (7)
62.	JGE Sucé-sur-Erdre (8)	0–1	US Philbertine Football (6)
63.	Montreuil-Juigné Béné Football (8)	0–8	La Roche VF (5)
64.	RC Doué-la-Fontaine (8)	2–2 (3–2 p)	AS Mulsanne-Teloché (6)
65.	AS St Pierre-Montrevault (7)	4–2	St André-St Macaire FC (8)
66.	Écommoy FC (7)	0–1	Ancienne Château-Gontier (6)
67.	JS Allonnes (8)	5–2	US Guécélard (8)
68.	Luçon FC (7)	4–3	Écureils des Pays de Monts (8)
69.	La Patriote Bonnétable (8)	3–1	Louverné Sports (7)
70.	FC Essartais (7)	2–1	US Aubigny (8)
71.	Petit-Mars FC (10)	2–1	St Melaine OS (11)
72.	Commequiers SF (10)	4–6 (a.e.t.)	ES St Denis-la-Chevasse (9)
73.	FC La Génétouze (9)	3–3 (4–3 p)	La Saint André (9)
74.	US Argentré (9)	1–0	Gorron FC (8)
75.	AS La Chapelle-St-Aubin (8)	2–4 (a.e.t.)	Stade Mayennais FC (6)
76.	AC Basse-Goulaine (7)	3–0	LSG Les Brouzils (7)
77.	ES Aubance (7)	0–1	US Bazouges-Cré (8)
78.	US Pré-en-Pail (10)	1–0	US St Berthevin (8)
79.	FC Val de Moine (10)	4–1	SomloirYzernay CPF (8)
80.	FC Meilleraie-Montournais-Menomblet (10)	1–0	AFC Bouin-Bois-de-Céné-Châteauneuf (11)
81.	Donges FC (10)	3–1	FC La Chapelle-des-Marais (8)
82.	ES Montilliers (9)	1–3	ES Segré (6)
83.	FC Villevêque-Soucelles (11)	1–4	AS Tiercé-Cheffes (8)

=== Fourth round ===
These matches were played on 28 and 29 September 2019.

Fourth round results: Pays de la Loire
Tie no	Home team (tier)	Score	Away team (tier)
1.	Olympique Saumur FC (5)	5–0	ES Segré (6)
2.	AS Bourny Laval (6)	2–0	Orvault SF (6)
3.	Élan de Gorges Foot (8)	0–2	Sablé FC (5)
4.	US La Baule-Le Pouliguen (7)	4–1	AC Chapelain Foot (7)
5.	FC Val de Moine (10)	4–4 (3–1 p)	FC Achards (8)
6.	FC Généraudière Roche Sud (10)	0–2	Les Herbiers VF (4)
7.	JS Coulaines (6)	2–1	AS Le Mans Villaret (7)
8.	Vendée Poiré-sur-Vie Football (6)	5–0	Luçon FC (7)
9.	Donges FC (10)	2–3	FC Pellouailles-Corze (8)
10.	Beaumont SA (8)	1–1 (6–5 p)	FC La Génétouze (9)
11.	FC Essartais (7)	0–2	Vendée Fontenay Foot (5)
12.	AS Seiches-sur-le-Loire-Marcé (8)	0–2	US Argentré (9)
13.	USA Pouancé (8)	4–0	La Patriote Bonnétable (8)
14.	US Vibraysienne (9)	1–3	ASI Mûrs-Erigné (7)
15.	FC Olonne Château (7)	1–2	US Changé (5)
16.	ES Pornichet (8)	0–0 (4–3 p)	ES Bonchamp (6)
17.	ES Bouchemaine (7)	3–1	Football Chalonnes-Chaudefonds (8)
18.	Petit-Mars FC (10)	0–2	SC Beaucouzé (6)
19.	ES St Denis-la-Chevasse (9)	2–1	US Nautique Spay (7)
20.	FC Laurentais Landemontais (9)	2–1	St Sébastien FC (6)
21.	EG Rouillon (8)	1–0	RC Doué-la-Fontaine (8)
22.	Saint-Nazaire AF (6)	4–0	Elan Sorinières Football (7)
23.	USM Beauvoir-sur-Mer (10)	0–9	Pouzauges Bocage FC (5)
24.	JS Allonnes (8)	1–4	USSA Vertou (5)
25.	ASVR Ambillou-Château (11)	2–2 (3–4 p)	Mouilleron SF (7)
26.	US Chauché (8)	0–1	La Flèche RC (5)
27.	AS Tiercé-Cheffes (8)	1–0	ES La Copechagnière (9)
28.	TVEC Les Sables-d'Olonne (6)	4–4 (3–5 p)	AC Basse-Goulaine (7)
29.	Voltigeurs de Châteaubriant (5)	4–2 (a.e.t.)	Stade Mayennais FC (6)
30.	USJA Carquefou (7)	0–1	NDC Angers (6)
31.	US Pré-en-Pail (10)	1–7	US Loire et Divatte (8)
32.	US Roézé (9)	1–4	ES Marsouins Brétignolles-Brem (8)
33.	BoupèreMonProuant FC (9)	3–2	ESOF La Roche-sur-Yon (6)
34.	Ancienne Château-Gontier (6)	2–1	Etoile de Clisson (7)
35.	FC Meilleraie-Montournais-Menomblet (10)	0–5	FC Challans (5)
36.	Angers Vaillante Foot (7)	2–3	Mareuil SC (7)
37.	FC Beaupréau La Chapelle (8)	4–2	Jeunes d'Erbray (9)
38.	St Cyr Foot Herbignac (10)	0–4	Olympique Chemillé-Melay (8)
39.	AS Bayard-Saumur (8)	2–1	AS St Pierre-Montrevault (7)
40.	FC Plaine et Bocage (8)	0–1 (a.e.t.)	FC Rezé (6)
41.	US Philbertine Football (6)	1–1 (1–3 p)	La Roche VF (5)
42.	US Bazouges-Cré (8)	2–1	Patriote Brulonnaise (7)

=== Fifth round ===
These matches were played on 12 and 13 October 2019.

Fifth round results: Pays de la Loire
Tie no	Home team (tier)	Score	Away team (tier)
1.	EG Rouillon (8)	4–3 (a.e.t.)	USA Pouancé (8)
2.	Beaumont SA (8)	1–2	SC Beaucouzé (6)
3.	Olympique Chemillé-Melay (8)	0–1	Ancienne Château-Gontier (6)
4.	Mareuil SC (7)	2–2 (5–4 p)	Pouzauges Bocage FC (5)
5.	US Argentré (9)	1–4	USSA Vertou (5)
6.	FC Beaupréau La Chapelle (8)	0–5	SO Cholet (3)
7.	ES Bouchemaine (7)	1–2 (a.e.t.)	JS Coulaines (6)
8.	ES St Denis-la-Chevasse (9)	0–4	US Changé (5)
9.	Sablé FC (5)	3–1	FC Rezé (6)
10.	FC Val de Moine (10)	2–7	Les Herbiers VF (4)
11.	US Loire et Divatte (8)	1–0	US Bazouges-Cré (8)
12.	AC Basse-Goulaine (7)	1–1 (4–2 p)	Saint-Nazaire AF (6)
13.	ES Marsouins Brétignolles-Brem (8)	0–3	Stade Lavallois (3)
14.	FC Laurentais Landemontais (9)	0–1	ASI Mûrs-Erigné (7)
15.	FC Pellouailles-Corze (8)	1–1 (7–8 p)	Vendée Fontenay Foot (5)
16.	Mouilleron SF (7)	2–2 (2–3 p)	NDC Angers (6)
17.	La Roche VF (5)	0–4	Voltigeurs de Châteaubriant (5)
18.	BoupèreMonProuant FC (9)	0–2	La Flèche RC (5)
19.	AS Tiercé-Cheffes (8)	0–2	Vendée Poiré-sur-Vie Football (6)
20.	ES Pornichet (8)	2–2 (5–4 p)	AS Bourny Laval (6)
21.	FC Challans (5)	2–2 (4–3 p)	Olympique Saumur FC (5)
22.	US La Baule-Le Pouliguen (7)	3–1	AS Bayard-Saumur (8)

=== Sixth round ===
These matches were played on 26 and 27 October 2019.

Sixth round results: Pays de la Loire
Tie no	Home team (tier)	Score	Away team (tier)
1.	US Loire et Divatte (8)	0–2	La Flèche RC (5)
2.	USSA Vertou (5)	0–0 (4–5 p)	Stade Lavallois (3)
3.	EG Rouillon (8)	0–2	US La Baule-Le Pouliguen (7)
4.	ES Pornichet (8)	1–4 (a.e.t.)	Sablé FC (5)
5.	SC Beaucouzé (6)	1–1 (2–4 p)	FC Challans (5)
6.	JS Coulaines (6)	1–4	Vendée Poiré-sur-Vie Football (6)
7.	ASI Mûrs-Erigné (7)	1–1 (4–2 p)	US Changé (5)
8.	AC Basse-Goulaine (7)	0–1	Voltigeurs de Châteaubriant (5)
9.	Vendée Fontenay Foot (5)	2–0	NDC Angers (6)
10.	Les Herbiers VF (4)	3–2	SO Cholet (3)
11.	Ancienne Château-Gontier (6)	4–2	Mareuil SC (7)
