= Guillaume Yenoussi =

Togolese footballer

Personal information
- Date of birth: 2 June 1997 (age 29)
- Place of birth: Lomé, Togo
- Height: 1.74 m (5 ft 9 in)
- Position: Winger

Team information
- Current team: Romorantin
- Number: 11

Senior career*
Years	Team	Apps	(Gls)
2016–2018	Dynamic Togolais		
2018–2020	Bergerac	9	(0)
2020–2022	Haguenau	27	(8)
2022–2023	Chambly	13	(0)
2023–	Romorantin	19	(4)

International career^{‡}
2017–2018	Togo U21	4	(0)
2017–	Togo	9	(0)
- * Club domestic league appearances and goals as of 20:04, 10 October 2023 (UTC) ‡ National team caps and goals as of 14 August 2023

Guillaume Yenoussi (born 2 June 1997) is a Togolese professional footballer who plays as a winger for Championnat National 1 club Romorantin and the Togo national team.

== Club career ==
Yenoussi began his career in Dynamic Togolais, and moved to France with Bergerac in 2018, playing in the Championnat National 2. He moved to Haguenau in 2020, scoring 7 goals in 26 games in his second season.

== International career ==
Yenoussi debuted with the Togo national team in a 0–0 friendly tie with Libya on 24 March 2017. He made 7 appearances with Togo in 2017, before being called up again for matches in June 2022.
