= Jony Ramos =

São Tomé and Príncipe footballer

Personal information
- Full name: João Carlos Sacramento Ramos
- Date of birth: 12 May 1986 (age 40)
- Place of birth: Lisbon, Portugal
- Height: 1.88 m (6 ft 2 in)
- Position: Forward

Team information
- Current team: Ivry

Senior career*
Years	Team	Apps	(Gls)
2006–2008	Pescadores Caparica		
2008	Eléctrico	10	(1)
2009	Crato	16	(5)
2009	Mineiro Aljustrelense	1	(0)
2009–2010	Portosantense	25	(3)
2010–2011	Caniçal	30	(7)
2011–2012	Macedo de Cavaleiros	20	(0)
2012	Pinhalnovense	5	(1)
2012–2013	Atlético Reguengos	23	(8)
2013–2014	Moura	24	(8)
2014–2018	Lusitanos Saint-Maur	68	(26)
2018–2020	Paris 13 Atletico	46	(25)
2022–	Ivry	0	(0)

International career
2015–	São Tomé and Príncipe	8	(0)
- * Club domestic league appearances and goals as of 14:41, 20 April 2022 (UTC)

João Carlos Sacramento Ramos (born 12 May 1986), known as Jony Ramos or simply Jony, is a professional footballer who plays as a forward for Championnat National 3 club Ivry. Born in Portugal, he represents São Tomé and Príncipe at international level.

== International career ==
Jony is a member of the São Tomé and Príncipe national team. He made his international debut on 5 September 2015. He also appeared in the 2018 FIFA World Cup qualification first round matches against Morocco.
