= Bourges Foot =

French football club

- Full name: Bourges Foot
- Founded: 1983
- Dissolved: 2021
- Ground: Stade Jacques Rimbault
- Capacity: 13,000
- Website: www.bourgesfoot.fr

Bourges Foot was a football club based in Bourges in the Centre-Val de Loire region of France. The club was founded in 1983 as L'Amicale des Algériens de Bourges, was renamed in 2003 as Jeunes de Bourges Nord, and took the name of Bourges Foot at the start of the 2013–14 season. In 2021, it merged with Bourges 18 to create a new club, Bourges Foot 18.

The club climbed steadily through the amateur divisions, from the district division (level nine and below of the French football pyramid) in 2003 to the Championnat National 2 for the first time in the club's history in the 2019–20 season. They reached the 9th round of the 2018–19 Coupe de France, losing to Lyon.

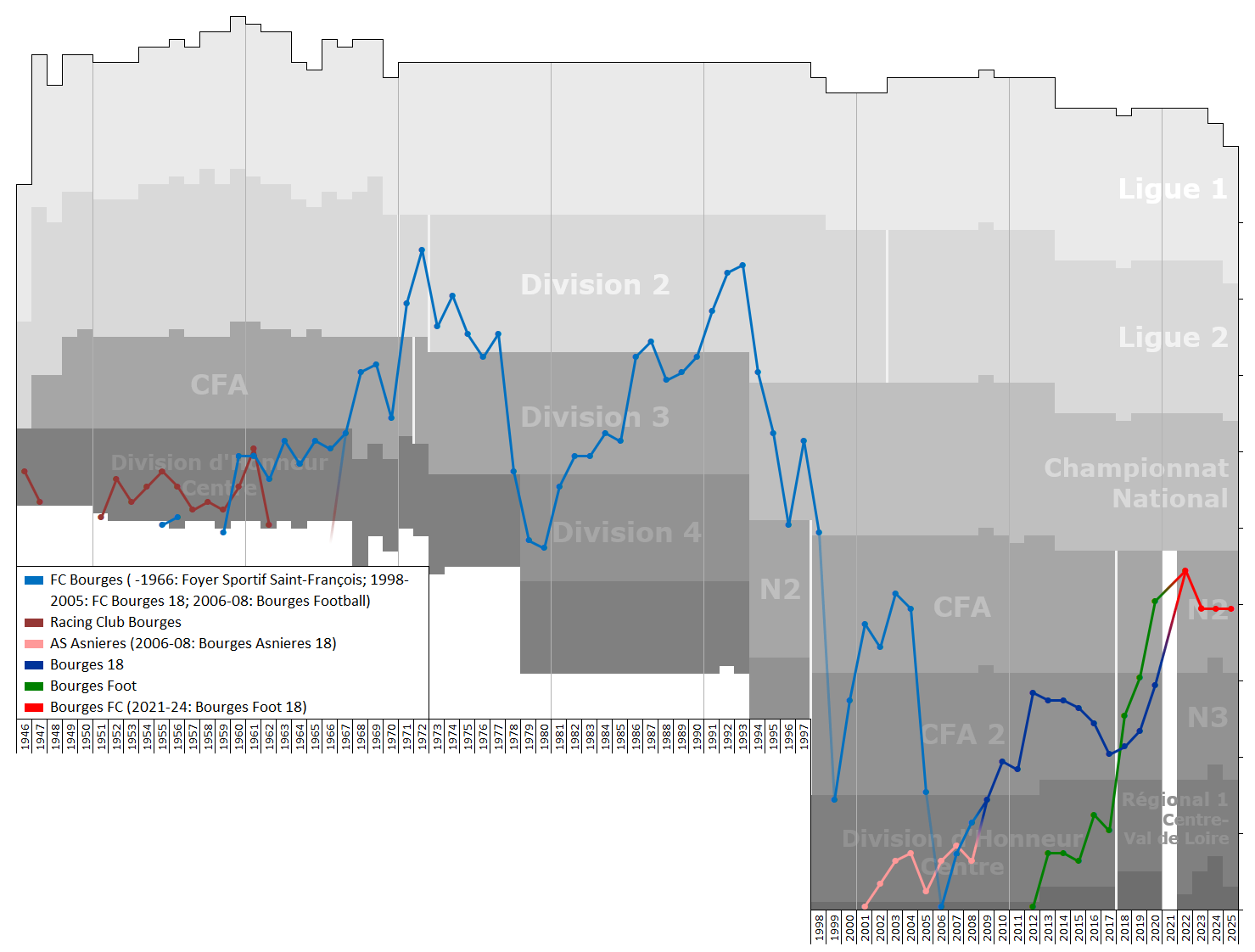
Historical league performance chart of Bourges football clubs

== Honours ==
- Championnat National 3 Centre-Val de Loire: 2018–19
