= Bourges 18 =

French football club, based in Bourges

- Full name: Bourges 18
- Nickname: Dix-Huit
- Founded: 1966; 60 years ago (as FC Bourges); 2008; 18 years ago (as Bourges 18)
- Dissolved: 2021; 5 years ago
- Ground: Stade Jacques Rimbault
- Capacity: 8,000
- Website: https://www.bourges18.com
Home colours	Away colours

Bourges 18 was a football club based in Bourges, France. In the summer of 2008, FC Bourges, which formerly spent eleven seasons in the Division 2, merged with Bourges-Asnières 18 to create Bourges 18. The club's colours were red and blue. In 2021, a merger with Bourges Foot created the new club Bourges Foot 18.

== History ==
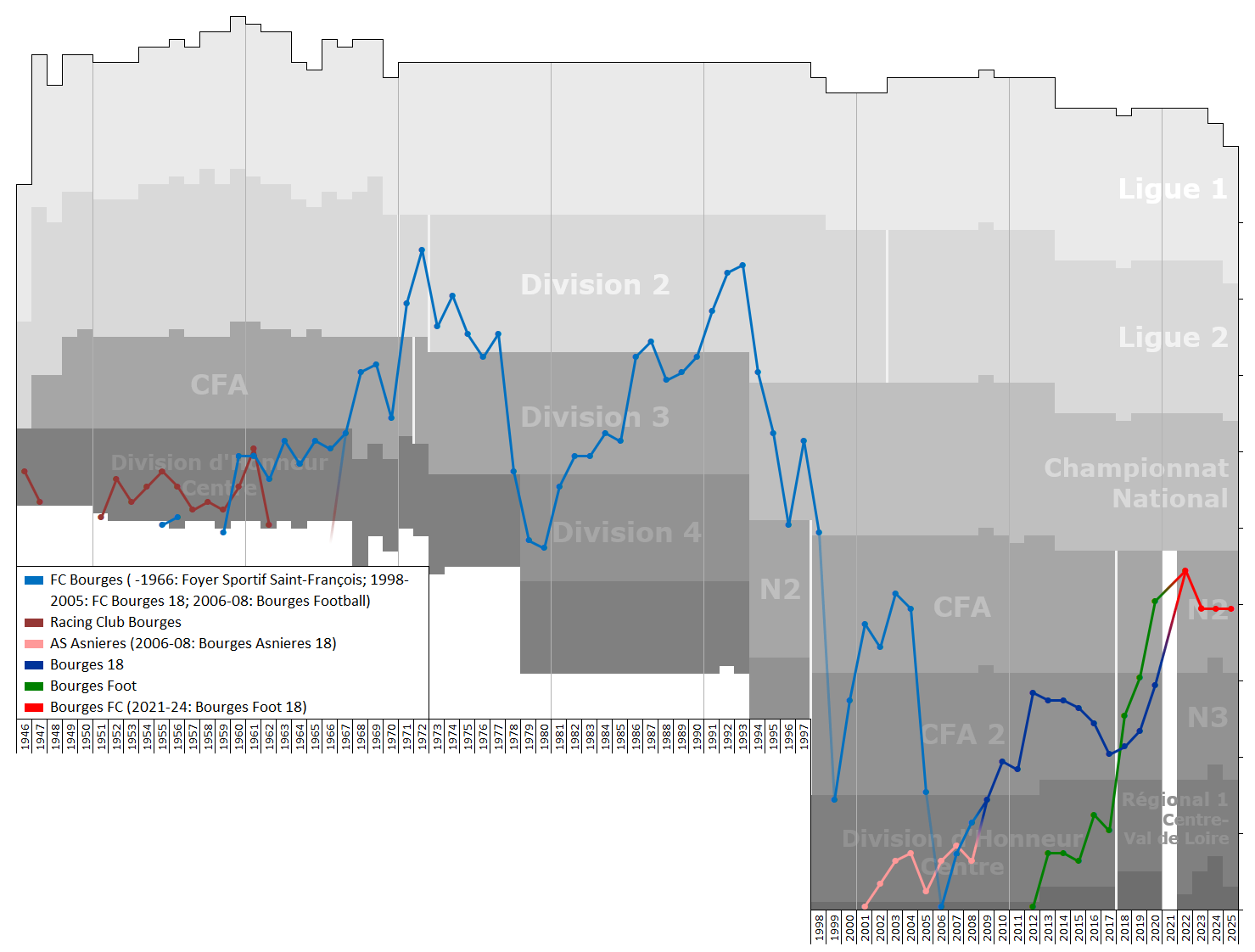
Historical league performance chart of Bourges football clubs

- 1966: Foyer Saint-François Bourges and Racing Club de Bourges were amalgamated to form FC Bourges.
- 1970–1994: The club played intermittently in the Division 2
- 1994–1998: The club played in the Championnat National but went bankrupt in January 1998, and was henceforth known as FC Bourges 18
- 2005: after another bankruptcy, the club changed its name to Bourges Football Olympique Club
- 2006: The club is renamed once more and becomes Bourges Football
- 2008: Bourges Football and Bourges Asnières 18 amalgamate to become Bourges 18.
- 2021: Bourges 18 and Bourges Foot merge to create Bourges Foot 18.

== Honours ==
- 1975–76: Champions of the Division 3 Group Centre-West
- 1995–96: Champions of the National 2
- 1966–67, 1998–99, 2008–09: Champions of the Division d'Honneur Centre

== Managers ==
Incomplete list

- 1967–1968 Noël Gallo
- 1968–1970 Roger Meerseman
- 1970–1972 Robert Siatka
- 1972–1973 César Pancho Gonzales
- 1973–1974 Robert Siatka
- 1974–1975 Emile Daniel
- 1975–1976 Kerim Ibrahim
- 1976–1978 Pierre Barlaguet
- 1980–1982 Robert Valette
- 1982–1983 Robert Nouzaret
- 1983–1984 Marcel Leborgne
- 1984–1993 Alain Michel
- 1993–1994 Alain Michel/Bobby Brown
- 1994–1998 Bobby Brown
- 1998–2002 Jean Gomez/Pavle Vostanic
- 2002–2004 Pavle Vostanic
- 2004–2005 Pascal Dupuis
- 2005–2008 Laurent Di Bernardo
- 2008–2009 Stéphane Drici
