= 2010–11 in French football =

The 2010–11 season is the 78th season of competitive professional football in France. The league season began on 6 August 2010 for the Championnat National and Ligue 2 and on 7 August for Ligue 1 and the Championnat de France amateur. The season concluded on 26 May 2011 for Ligue 2, 27 May for the Championnat National, and 28 May for Ligue 1 and the Championnat de France amateur. The men's France national team began play on 11 August contesting a friendly match against Norway, while the women continued their quest for qualification to the 2011 FIFA Women's World Cup by facing Iceland on 21 August.

== News ==
=== Television deals ===
On 1 April 2010, the LFP announced that the league had reached a broadcasting agreement with Italian channel Sportitalia. The channel will broadcast Ligue 1 games for the next two seasons beginning with the 2010–11 season. Sportitalia will show one or two live matches a week and will also air a weekly highlights show. A similar deal was reached a week later with Hong Kong telecommunications company PCCW who will broadcast Ligue 1 matches in the country for the next two seasons. On 7 May, the president of the Ligue de Football Professionnel, Frédéric Thiriez, announced that the organization had reached a two-year deal with Eurosport to broadcast Ligue 2 matches. The deal is worth €10 million a year and guarantees the channel broadcasting rights to the annual Monday night Ligue 2 match.

=== Le Classique in Tunisia ===
On 2 April, the LFP announced that, for the second consecutive season, the Trophée des champions will be held on international soil. The match will be played in Tunis, Tunisia, at the Stade 7 Novembre and will be contested by the winner of Ligue 1, Olympique de Marseille and the winner of the Coupe de France, Paris Saint-Germain. The match will be played on either Tuesday, 27 July, or Friday, 30 July. Like last year, the idea will be to promote French football abroad, but this time more specifically in Africa and the Arab world.

=== New channel in 2012 ===
On 7 May 2010, the president of the Ligue de Football Professionnel, Frédéric Thiriez, confirmed that the organization was interested in creating its own television channel for the broadcasting Ligue 1 and Ligue 2 matches. Thiriez referred to the channel as "an investment for the future" and that the channel will not come to fruition until the conclusion of the organization's television deals with pay channels Canal+, Orange and SFR, which expires in 2012.

=== Artificial pitch switch ===
On 17 May 2010, the Ligue de Football Professionnel announced that, for the first time in French football history, two clubs, Lorient and Nancy, will switch the surface of their football pitch from grass to artificial turf. This type of surface is common in North America and Eastern Europe, but is considered rare in Western Europe. Both clubs attributed the switch to weather and ecological problems with severe cold fronts affecting their region every winter. The switch would, in turn, reduce energy costs and also avoid cancellations of matches due to a frozen pitch. Also, in Lorient's case, a constant proliferation of earthworms onto their pitch over the past two seasons have led to a rapid deterioration of the ground, which has forced the club to spend as much as €2 million to replace it. Both clubs will have pre-season tours of Russia, Austria, and Norway to become better acclimated with the surface.

=== New national team manager ===
On 16 May 2010, Laurent Blanc confirmed his departure from Bordeaux after three seasons in charge of the French outfit. After resigning from his position, Blanc contacted the French Football Federation (FFF) to inquire about the France national team job, which will be vacated by Raymond Domenech following the 2010 FIFA World Cup. Later that day, FFF president Jean-Pierre Escalettes confirmed that Blanc was a candidate for the position. On 18 May 2010, with Blanc's appointment to the position becoming more probable, Bordeaux chairman Jean-Louis Triaud demanded compensation from the FFF. On 20 May 2010, the club reached an agreement with the Federation for €1.5 million. Blanc will not be named the coach of the team until the end of the World Cup.

=== Evian stadium move ===
After earning promotion to Ligue 2 for the 2010–11 season, Evian were rumored to be pursuing a move to play their home matches at the Stade de la Praille in Geneva, Switzerland, after it was determined that their current facility, the Stade Joseph-Moynat, did not meet the Ligue de Football Professionnel (LFP)'s standards. Thonon-les-Bains, the commune where the club situates itself, is a few kilometers from the Swiss border and is only 34.6 kilometres (21.5 mi), a 45-minute car drive, from the city of Geneva. It was reported that the club's president, Patrick Trotignon, had been in the process of advocating for the move since the beginning of the 2009–10 Championnat National season just in case the club had achieved promotion to the second division. The vice-president of Swiss club Servette FC, who occupy the stadium, questioned the move, citing possible schedule conflicts as well as the health of the pitch if both clubs were to use the stadium on a weekly basis. His claims, however, were refuted by Benoît Genecand, who serves as president of Fondation du Stade de Genève (FSG), which owns and operates the facility. The club responded immediately to Genecand's comments via a press release posted on the club's official website.

Evian petitioned to the State Council of Geneva and obtained approval from the LFP for the move in early May. On 20 May 2010, Evian received a favorable ruling from the FFF with the Federal Council voting in favor of the move. According to the FFF, the move now had to be agreed upon by a UEFA executive committee, which is composed of 17 officials. On 8 June, UEFA officially denied Evian's request to play at the Stade de la Praille, meaning the club will likely play its home matches at the Parc des Sports in nearby Annecy.

=== Five referee system for cup ===
On 20 August 2010, the LFP confirmed that the Coupe de la Ligue would utilized the five-referee system that is currently being used in the UEFA Champions League and the UEFA Europa League. The announcement makes the Coupe de la Ligue the first national cup competition in Europe to adopt the system and was approved by the International Football Association Board (IFAB) on 21 July. The system officially began on 24 August with the start of the second round matches and will be in place until the final in April 2011.

=== DNCG rulings ===
==== National ====
On 15 June 2010, following a study of each club's administrative and financial accounts in the Championnat National, the DNCG ruled that both Bastia and Gueugnon would be relegated to the Championnat de France amateur, while Amiens, Guingamp and Strasbourg were having their accounts subjected to further deliberation in order to determine whether each club could retain its professional status. Both Bastia and Gueugnon had the option to appeal the decision. On 25 June 2010, the Corsican Assembly and the General Council of Haute-Corse approved grants of €800,000 and €150,000 to be given to Bastia in order for the club to meet the DNCG's financial requirements, which will allow the club to remain in the Championnat National. On 6 July, however, the DNCG remained firm on its stance relegating the club to the fourth division after questioning the legitimacy of the grants. Bastia president Julien Lolli remained confident that the club would play in the Championnat National and formerly made an appeal to the CNOSF, the National Sporting Committee of France, the same day. On 2 July, the DNCG announced that Gueugnon would remain in National after the club successfully appealed to the organization. On 16 July, the CNOSF ruled against the DNCG and announced that Bastia should play in the Championnat National. The club's place in the league was confirmed upon the release of the league table.

On 2 July, local media in Alsace reported that Strasbourg were on the verge of being relegated to the Championnat de France amateur by the DNCG due to financial issues. The club responded by announcing its willingness to appeal if the news reported was confirmed. With the club's accounts still being reviewed, Strasbourg's financial issues were slightly alleviated after the sale of striker Magaye Gueye to English club Everton for €1.4 million. Strasbourg later transferred captain Guillaume Lacour and Algerian international Yacine Bezzaz to Evian and Troyes, respectively, for nominal fees. On 16 July, the report was confirmed when the DNCG officially relegated Strasbourg to the CFA. Strasbourg will appeal the decision next week.

==== CFA ====
On 15 June 2010, following a study of each club's administrative and financial accounts in the Championnat de France amateur, the DNCG ruled that Besançon RC, Hyères FC, CS Louhans-Cuiseaux, FC Montceau Bourgogne, EDS Montluçon, Olympique Noisy-le-Sec, and RCF Paris would be relegated to the Championnat de France amateur 2. The organization also ruled that newly promoted club Calais RUFC would be excluded from ascending up to the fourth division, while SO Cassis Carnoux, which had been relegated from the Championnat National, would also be excluded from the league. The second place club in Calais' group, CMS Oissel, who was set to replace Calais was also denied promotion to the Championnat de France amateur. All clubs had the option to appeal the decision.

On 7 July, Besançon, Hyères, and Oissel's appeals were heard by the DNCG Appeals Committee and, following deliberation and explanations from each club, the committee ruled in favor of Besançon, but upheld the appeals of Hyères and Oissel. The following day, the appeals committee granted both Louhans-Cuiseaux and Noisy-le-Sec appeals to stay in the fourth division. The committee, however, upheld the rulings of Calais, Montceau Bourgogne, Montluçon, and Racing Paris.

=== Referee suspension ===
On 5 March 2011, the FFF confirmed through an official statement on its website that referees who were scheduled to officiate the 5–6 March matches would be barred from officiating them after it was revealed that the referees, who are all members of the Syndicat des Arbitres de Football Elite (SAFE), the referee's union, would purposely delay the start time of matches in response the overall "profound disrespect for referees from everyone involved in football". On its official website, the FFF regretted SAFE's decision and also accused the group of attempted blackmail. The referees were replaced by their counterparts in the Championnat National, the third level of French football, for the week.

=== Under-17 team record win ===
On 30 March 2011, the national under-17 team of France recorded a 9–0 win over Belarus in the Elite Round qualification for the 2011 UEFA European Under-17 Football Championship. The result is the biggest victory ever in Elite Round qualification history. The goals were scored by Paris Saint-Germain midfielder Abdallah Yaisien, who scored four; Caen striker Lenny Nangis, who scored a hat trick; Sébastien Haller of Auxerre, who converted a stoppage time penalty; and Athletic Bilbao defender Aymeric Laporte, who scored a first-half goal. The victory progressed the team to the final tournament.

=== Investigation into alleged quota ===
On 28 April 2011, French investigative website Mediapart released a story which claimed that the FFF had been attempting to secretly put in place a race-quota system in order to limit the number of black and Arab players in its national academies. Quoting a senior figure in the FFF, the organisation was said to have wanted to set a cap of 30% on the number of players of non-white origin by limiting places in the academies in the 12–13 age bracket. The FFF responded by releasing a public statement on its website denying the report stating "none of its elected bodies has been validated, or even contemplated a policy of quotas for the recruitment of its training centers". The FFF also announced that it has authorized a full investigation into the matter and, as a result, suspended National Technical Director François Blaquart pending the outcome of the investigation.

On 29 April, national team manager Laurent Blanc, who, in the report, was claimed to have agreed with the decision to implement the quotas, held a personal press conference at the l'Hôtel Le Régent in Bordeaux, in which he also denied the report declaring that he had "not heard of such a project". On the following day, after Mediapart announced that it had a taped audio recording of the November 2010 meeting, Blanc released a statement on the FFF's website in which he apologized for possible offending comments he made during the meeting, while also declaring he was misquoted and denying he was racist, stating, "I do not withdraw the remarks I made yesterday. I admit that some terms used during a meeting on a sensitive subject can be ambiguous, out of context, and, if in my case, I've hurt some feelings, I apologize. But being suspected of racism or xenophobia, which I am against all forms of discrimination, I do not support it."

Former national team player Lilian Thuram said of the allegations, "Initially I thought this was a joke. I'm so stunned I don't know what to say," while Patrick Vieira declared that the comments Blanc allegedly made at the meeting made were "serious and scandalous". The French government also gave opinions on the matter. President Nicolas Sarkozy was quoted as being "viscerally opposed to any form of quota", while adding "setting quotas would be the end of the Republic". National Sports Minister Chantal Jouanno echoed the President's sentiments, while also demanding that the FFF "shed light" on a report. Blanc was defended by several former players, most notably his 1998 World Cup-winning teammates Christophe Dugarry, Bixente Lizarazu, Didier Deschamps, Zinedine Zidane, Marcel Desailly and Emmanuel Petit, current players such as current national team captain Alou Diarra, and external sources, which included Pathé Diba, the president of L'Association Soutien aux Handicapés Africains (English: Association to Support the Disabled in Africa). On 9 May, Blanc gave testimony at a hearing set up by the FFF to investigate the quota matter. The results of the inquiry will be revealed on 10 May.

== Promotion and relegation ==
Teams promoted to Ligue 1

- Caen
- Brest
- Arles-Avignon

Teams relegated to Ligue 2

- Le Mans
- Boulogne
- Grenoble

Teams promoted to Ligue 2

- Evian
- Reims
- Troyes

Teams relegated to Championnat National

- Guingamp
- Strasbourg
- Bastia

Teams promoted to Championnat National

- Colmar
- Gap
- Niort
- Orléans
- Alfortville

Teams relegated to Championnat de France amateur

- Moulins
- Hyères
- Cassis Carnoux
- Louhans-Cuiseaux

Promoted to Championnat de France amateur

- Aubervilliers
- Avion
- Béziers
- Calais
- Lorient Reserves
- Metz Reserves
- Monaco Reserves
- Monts d'Or Azergues
- Le Poiré-sur-Vie
- Saint-Étienne Reserves
- Saint-Pryvé Saint-Hilaire
- Uzès Pont du Gard

Teams relegated to Championnat de France amateur 2

- Balma
- Bordeaux Reserves
- Dunkerque
- Grenoble Reserves
- Le Pontet
- Mantes
- Marck
- Montpellier Reserves
- Pontivy
- Quimper
- Strasbourg Reserves
- Toulouse Fontaines
- Vesoul Haute-Saône

Teams promoted to Championnat de France amateur 2

- Bonchamp
- Borgo
- Brive
- Chambly
- Chartres
- Dinan-Léhon
- Forbach
- Grand-Synthe
- Granville
- Jura Dolois
- La Châtaigneraie
- Lannion
- Le Puy
- Lormont
- Paris B
- Prix-les-Mézières
- Revel
- Saint Marcel
- Sablé-sur-Sarthe
- Schiltigheim
- Toulon-Le Las
- Vierzon

== Managerial changes ==
=== Ligue 1 ===
Team	Outgoing head coach	Manner of departure	Date of vacancy	Table	Incoming head coach	Date of appointment	Table
Bordeaux	(France) Laurent Blanc	Mutual consent	16 May 2010	Off-season	(France) Jean Tigana	25 May 2010	Off-season

==== In-season ====
Team	Outgoing head coach	Manner of departure	Date of vacancy	Position in table	Incoming head coach	Date of appointment	Position in table
Arles-Avignon	(France) Michel Estevan	Sacked	16 September 2010	20th	(Bosnia and Herzegovina) Faruk Hadžibegić	2 October 2010	20th
Lens	(France) Jean-Guy Wallemme	Resigned	2 January 2011	19th	(Romania) László Bölöni	2 January 2011	19th
Monaco	(France) Guy Lacombe	Sacked	10 January 2011	17th	(France) Laurent Banide	10 January 2011	17th
Bordeaux	(France) Jean Tigana	Resigned	7 May 2011	9th	(France) Eric Bédouet	7 May 2011	9th

=== Ligue 2 ===
Team	Outgoing manager	Manner of departure	Date of vacancy	Table	Incoming manager	Date of appointment	Table
Reims	(France) Marc Collat	Mutual consent	16 May 2010	Off-season	(France) Hubert Fournier	18 May 2010	Off-season
Châteauroux	(France) Jean-Pierre Papin	Resigned	18 May 2010	Off-season	(France) Didier Tholot	1 June 2010	Off-season
Metz	(France) Joël Muller	Mutual consent	14 May 2010	Off-season	(France) Dominique Bijotat	4 June 2010	Off-season
Troyes	(France) Patrick Rémy	Mutual consent	22 June 2010	Off-season	(France) Jean-Marc Furlan	23 June 2010	Off-season

==== In-season ====
Team	Outgoing manager	Manner of departure	Date of vacancy	Table	Incoming manager	Date of appointment	Table
Grenoble	(Bosnia and Herzegovina) Mehmed Baždarević	Mutual consent	1 September 2010	20th	(France) Yvon Pouliquen	6 September 2010	20th
Nîmes	(France) Jean-Michel Cavalli	Contract terminated	8 November 2010	17th	(France) Noël Tosi	8 November 2010	17th
Boulogne	(France) Laurent Guyot	Contract terminated	27 December 2010	12th	(France) Michel Estevan	30 December 2010	12th
Nîmes	(France) Noël Tosi	Contract terminated	2 March 2011	17th	(France) Thierry Froger	2 March 2011	17th
Nantes	(France) Baptiste Gentili	Resigned	6 March 2011	15th	(France) Philippe Anziani	6 March 2011	15th

=== Championnat National ===
Team	Outgoing manager	Manner of departure	Date of vacancy	Table	Incoming manager	Date of appointment	Table
Guingamp	(France) Victor Zvunka	Resigned	15 May 2010	Off-season	(France) Jocelyn Gourvennec	17 May 2010	Off-season
Bastia	(Bosnia and Herzegovina) Faruk Hadzibegic	Resigned	17 May 2010	Off-season	(France) Frédéric Hantz	22 May 2010	Off-season
Créteil	(France) Laurent Fournier	Resigned	21 May 2010	Off-season	(France) Hubert Velud	25 May 2010	Off-season
Strasbourg	(France) Pascal Janin	Resigned	29 May 2010	Off-season	(France) Laurent Fournier	9 June 2010	Off-season
Gueugnon	(France) René Le Lamer	End of contract	21 May 2010	Off-season	(France) Serge Romano	7 July 2010	Off-season
Gap	(France) Franck Priou	Signed for Martigues	31 May 2010	Off-season	(France) Patrick Bruzzichessi	6 June 2010	Off-season

==== In-season ====
Team	Outgoing manager	Manner of departure	Date of vacancy	Table	Incoming manager	Date of appointment	Table
Alfortville	(France) William Longuet	Fired	5 October 2010	21st	(France) Azzedine Meguellatti	23 November 2010	21st
Cannes	(France) Albert Emon	Fired	31 January 2011	5th	(France) Victor Zvunka	31 January 2011	5th

== Competitions ==
Competition	Winner	Details	Match Report
Ligue 1	Lille	2010–11 Ligue 1	
Ligue 2	Evian	2010–11 Ligue 2	
Championnat National	Bastia	2010–11 Championnat National	
Championnat de France amateur	Gazélec Ajaccio	2010–11 Championnat de France amateur	
Championnat de France amateur 2	Chambéry	2010–11 Championnat de France amateur 2	
Division 1 Féminine	Lyon	2010–11 Division 1 Féminine	
Coupe de France	Lille	2010–11 Coupe de France; Beat Paris SG 1–0	Report
Coupe de la Ligue	Marseille	2010–11 Coupe de la Ligue; Beat Montpellier 1–0	Report
Challenge de France	Saint-Étienne	2010–11 Challenge de France; Beat Montpellier 3–2 on penalties	Report
Coupe Gambardella	Monaco	2010–11 Coupe Gambardella; Beat Saint-Étienne 4–3 on penalties	Report
Trophée des Champions	Marseille	2010 Trophée des Champions; Beat Paris SG 5–4 on penalties	Report

=== International competitions ===
==== Men's ====
Team / Competition	UEFA Champions League	UEFA Europa League
Marseille	Round of 16 eliminated by (England) Manchester United	did not qualify
Lyon	Round of 16 eliminated by (Spain) Real Madrid	did not qualify
Auxerre	Group stage eliminated	did not qualify
Montpellier	did not qualify	Third qualifying round eliminated by (Hungary) Győri ETO
Lille	did not qualify	Round of 32 eliminated by (Netherlands) PSV
Paris Saint-Germain	did not qualify	Round of 16 eliminated by (Portugal) Benfica

==== Women's ====
Team / Competition	UEFA Women's Champions League
Lyon	Champions defeated (Germany) Turbine Potsdam in Final
FCF Juvisy	Quarterfinals eliminated by (Germany) Turbine Potsdam

== National teams ==
=== France ===
Friendly

11 August 2010	Norway	2 – 1	France	Oslo
21:15 CET	Huseklepp 51', 71'	Report	Ben Arfa 48'	Stadium: Ullevaal Stadion; Attendance: 15,000; Referee: Carlos Velasco Carballo (Spain)

UEFA Euro 2012 qualification

3 September 2010	France	0 – 1	Belarus	Paris
21:00 CET		Report	Kislyak 85'	Stadium: Stade de France; Attendance: 76,395; Referee: William Collum (Scotland)

7 September 2010	Bosnia and Herzegovina	0 – 2	France	Sarajevo
21:00 CET		Report	Benzema 72'; Malouda 78'	Stadium: Asim Ferhatović Hase; Attendance: 30,000; Referee: Felix Brych (Germany)

9 October 2010	France	2 – 0	Romania	Saint-Denis
21:00 CET	Rémy 83'; Gourcuff 90+3'	Report		Stadium: Stade de France; Referee: Pedro Proença (Portugal)

12 October 2010	France	2 – 0	Luxembourg	Metz
21:00 CET	Benzema 22'; Gourcuff 76'	Report		Stadium: Stade Saint-Symphorien; Referee: Matej Jug (Slovenia)

Friendly

17 November 2010	England	1 – 2	France	London
21:00 CET	Crouch 82'	Report	Benzema 16'; Valbuena 55'	Stadium: Wembley Stadium; Referee: Claus Bo Larsen (Denmark)

9 February 2011	France	1 – 0	Brazil	Saint-Denis
21:00 CET	Benzema 54'	Report		Stadium: Stade de France; Referee: Wolfgang Stark (Germany)

UEFA Euro 2012 qualification

25 March 2011	Luxembourg	0 – 2	France	Luxembourg City
21:00 CET		Report	Mexès 28'; Gourcuff 72'	Stadium: Stade Josy Barthel; Referee: Tom Harald Hagen (Norway)

Friendly

29 March 2011	France	0 – 0	Croatia	Saint-Denis
21:00 CET		Report		Stadium: Stade de France; Referee: Alan Kelly (Republic of Ireland)

UEFA Euro 2012 qualification

3 June 2011	Belarus	1 – 1	France	Minsk
20:45 CEST	Abidal 20' (o.g.)	Report	Malouda 22'	Stadium: Dinamo Stadium; Referee: David Fernández Borbalán (Spain)

Friendly

6 June 2011	Ukraine	1 – 4	France	Donetsk
21:00 CEST	Tymoshchuk 53'	Report	Gameiro 58'; Martin 87', 90+2'; Kaboul 89'	Stadium: Donbas Arena; Referee: Mark Clattenburg (England)

9 June 2011	Poland	0 – 1	France	Stadion Wojska Polskiego, Warsaw
21:00 CEST		Report	N'Zogbia 13'	Attendance: 31,000; Referee: Björn Kuipers (Netherlands)

Last updated: 15 June 2011
Source: French Football Federation

=== France (women's) ===
2011 FIFA Women's World Cup qualification

Group Stage; 21 August 2010	Iceland	0 – 1	France	Laugardalsvöllur, Reykjavík
18:00 CET		Report	Thiney 59'	Referee: Bibiana Steinhaus (Germany)

Group Stage; 25 August 2010	France	7 – 0	Serbia	Stade de l'Aube, Troyes
20:45 CET	Thomis 5'; Thiney 32', 63', 88'; Bussaglia 45'; Delie 60'; Abily 79'	Report		Referee: TBD

2011 FIFA Women's World Cup playoff qualification

First Leg; 11 September 2010	France	0 – 0	Italy	Stade Léo Lagrange, Besançon
20:45 CET		Report		Attendance: 9,154; Referee: Kateryna Monzul (Ukraine)

Second Leg; 16 September 2010	Italy	2 – 3	France	Stadio Pietro Barbetti, Gubbio
15:00 CET	Panico 34'; Domenichetti 90+3'	Report	Bussaglia 54'; Thiney 58'; Bompastor 90+2'	Referee: Jenny Palmqvist (Sweden)

Friendly

19 November 2010	France	5 – 0	Poland	Stade Jean Bouin, Angers
20:00 CET	Le Sommer 1'; Necib 7', 40'; Lepailleur 70', 73'	Report		Attendance: 4,000

Cyprus Cup

Group stage 2 March 2011	France	2 – 0	Switzerland	GSP Stadium, Nicosia
14:00 CET	Thiney 23'; Abily 56'	Report

Group stage 4 March 2011	France	1 – 2	Netherlands	Ammochostos Stadium, Ammochostos
13:00 CET	Abily 8'	Report	Hoogendijk 6'; Melis 74'

Group stage 7 March 2011	New Zealand	2 – 5	France	GSP Stadium, Nicosia
14:00 CET	Dusang 6' (o.g.); Green 31'	Report	Delie 15', 18', 81'; Le Sommer 24'; Bussaglia 83'

Third Place Match; 9 March 2011	Scotland	0 – 3	France	GSP Stadium, Nicosia
13:00 CET		Report	Delie 30', 73', 85'

Friendly

18 May 2011	France	1 – 1	Scotland	Stade Francis-Le Blé, Brest
19:00 CET	Bussaglia 44' (pen.)	Report	L. Ross 14'	Referee: Sabine Bonnin (France)

15 June 2011	Belgium	1 – 2	France	Sportpark de Lenspolder, Nieuwpoort
19:30 CEST		Report	Delie 57', 84'	Referee: Jeen Martens (Belgium)

18 June 2011	France	7 – 0	Belgium	Stade de l'Épopée, Calais
20:45 CEST	Delie 13', 39', 41'; Abily 18'; Thomis 60'; Necib 67'; Brétigny 69'	Report		Referee: Mittlebron (France)

2011 FIFA Women's World Cup

Group stage 26 June 2011	Nigeria	0 – 1	France	Rhein-Neckar-Arena, Sinsheim
15:00 CET		Report	Delie 56'	Attendance: 25,475; Referee: Kari Seitz (United States)

Group stage 30 June 2011	Canada	0 – 4	France	Ruhrstadion, Bochum
18:00 CET		Report	Thiney 24', 60'; Abily 66'; Thomis 83'	Attendance: 16,591; Referee: Etsuko Fukano (Japan)

Group stage 5 July 2011	France	2 – 4	Germany	Borussia-Park, Mönchengladbach
20:45 CET	Delie 56'; Georges 72'	Report	Garefrekes 25'; Grings 32', 68' (pen.); Okoyino da Mbabi 88'	Attendance: 45,867; Referee: Kirsi Heikkinen (Finland)

Quarterfinals; 9 July 2011	England	1 – 1 (a.e.t.) (3 – 4 p)	France	BayArena, Leverkusen
18:00 CET	J. Scott 59'	Report	Bussaglia 87'	Attendance: 26,395; Referee: Jenny Palmqvist (Sweden)
	Penalties
	Smith (penalty scored); Carney (penalty scored); Stoney (penalty scored); Rafferty (penalty missed); White (penalty missed)		(penalty missed) Abily; (penalty scored) Bussaglia; (penalty scored) Thiney; (penalty scored) Bompastor; (penalty scored) Le Sommer

Semifinals; 13 July 2011	France	1 – 3 (a.e.t.)	United States	Borussia-Park, Mönchengladbach
18:00 CET	Bompastor 55'	Report	Cheney 9'; Wambach 79'; Morgan 82'	Attendance: 25,676; Referee: Kirsi Heikkinen (Finland)

Third Place Match; 16 July 2011	Sweden	2 – 1 (a.e.t.)	France	Rhein-Neckar-Arena, Sinsheim
17:30 CET	Schelin 29'; Hammarström 82'	Report	Thomis 56'	Referee: Kari Seitz (United States)

Last updated: 16 July 2011
Source: French Football Federation

=== France U-21 ===
2011 UEFA European Under-21 Football Championship qualification

Group Stage; 11 August 2010	France	0 – 1	Belgium	Stade de la Rabine, Vannes
18:15 CET		Report	Mokulu 8'	Referee: Luca Banti (Italy)

Group Stage; 3 September 2010	Ukraine	2 – 2	France	Obolon Stadium, Kyiv
18:30 CET	Butko 54'; Rakytskiy 58' (pen.)	Report	Bakar 62'; Rivière 74'	Referee: Milorad Mažic (Serbia)

Group Stage; 7 September 2010	France	2 – 0	Malta	Stade de la Licorne, Amiens
17:00 CET	Kitambala 58'; Yanga-M'Biwa 66'	Report		Referee: Artur Soares Dias (Portugal)

Friendly

8 October 2010	France	2 – 0	Turkey	Stade de l'Aube, Troyes
20:45 CET	Gueye 23'; Ngog 75'	Report		Referee: Babak Rafati (Germany)

12 October 2010	Denmark	3 – 1	France	TBD, Aalborg
17:30 CET	Nielsen 31'	Report	Ngog 14'; Bjelland 33' (o.g.); Schneiderlin 43'

16 November 2010	France	0 – 1	Russia	Stade Léon-Bollée, Le Mans
20:45 CET		Report	Gatagov 63'	Referee: Lee Probert (England)

8 February 2011	France	3 – 1	Slovakia	Stade Gaston Petit, Châteauroux
20:45 CET	Camara 23'; Corchia 47', 50'	Report	Žilák 90'	Referee: Christof Virant (Belgium)

24 March 2011	France	3 – 2	Spain	Stade Auguste-Delaune II, Reims
20:45 CET	Rivière 11', 18'; Gueye 35'	Report	Mérida 37'; Rodri 59'	Referee: Richard Liesveld (Netherlands)

29 March 2011	Czech Republic	0 – 1	France	Andrův stadion, Olomouc
16:45 CET		Report	Privat 28'	Referee: Jan Valasek (Slovakia)

2 June 2011	France	1 – 0	Serbia	Stade Robert Diochon, Rouen
20:45 CEST	Saivet 15'	Report		Attendance: 6,000; Referee: Christof Dierick (Belgium)

5 June 2011	Ukraine	1 – 1	France	TBD, Kyiv
20:45 CEST	Kartushov 11'	Report	Cabella 67'	Referee: Ihor Pokydko (Ukraine

Last updated: 5 June 2011
Source: French Football Federation

=== France U-20 ===
Friendly

7 October 2010	France	3 – 3	Portugal	Stade Municipal de Péronnas, Péronnas
18:30 CET	Lacazette 22'; Bakambu 29'; Grenier 83'	Report	N. Oliveira 49', 77'; Freitas 67'	Referee: Sébastien Desiale (France)

Unofficial Friendly

10 October 2010	France	5 – 0	(Italy) Juventus Primavera	Stade Jacques Level, Chambéry
15:30 CET	Lacazette 10', 34'; Sunu 40'; Bourgeois; Reale 88'	Report

Friendly

16 November 2010	France	1 – 0	Montenegro	Clairefontaine, Clairefontaine-en-Yvelines
18:30 CET	Bourgeois 90'	Report		Referee: Mikaël Lesage (France)

Unofficial Friendly

18 November 2010	France	2 – 1	(France) US Orléans	Clairefontaine, Clairefontaine-en-Yvelines
11:00 CET	Bakambu 54', 60'	Report	Goal

Friendly

9 February 2011	England	1 – 2	France	New Meadow, Shrewsbury
19:30 CET	Sordell 11'	Report	Grenier 38'; Lacazette 64'

23 March 2011	Peru	0 – 3	France	Estadio San Martín de Porres, Lima
21:30 CET		Report	Lejeune 10'; Lacazette 24'; Bakambu 82'

25 March 2011	Peru	1 – 2	France	Complejo Deportivo Rendimiento, Chincha Alta
22:00 CET	69' (pen.)	Report	Sunu 83'; Lacazette 88'

17 May 2011	France	3 – 3	United States	Stade Hector Rolland, Moulins
19:00 CEST	Tafer 15'; Knockaert 55', 88'	Report	Rowe 8'; Gatt 44'; Gil 54'

19 May 2011	France	2 – 1	United States	Stade Louis Darragon, Vichy
19:00 CEST	Sunu 18'; Tafer 56'	Report	Doyle 22'

2011 Toulon Tournament

Group stage 2 June 2011	France	4 – 1	Mexico	Stade Perruc, Hyères
19:00 CEST	Knockaert 5'; Joseph-Monrose 40'; Tafer 64'; Benezet 70'	Report	Dávila 25'	Referee: Santos Capela (Portugal)

Group stage 4 June 2011	France	4 – 0	China	Stade du Ray, Nice
19:00 CEST	Joseph-Monrose 21', 39'; Benezet 64'; Jarsalé 70'	Report		Referee: Imer Machado (Colombia)

Group stage 6 June 2011	France	1 – 1	Hungary	Stade de Lattre, Aubagne
19:00 CEST	Duplus 80'	Report	Futács 46'	Referee: Andrea De Marco (Italy)

Semi-finals; 8 June 2011	France	1 – 0	Italy	Stade Mayol, Toulon
20:00 CEST	Joseph-Monrose 62'	Report		Referee: Sándor Andó-Szabó (Hungary

Final; 10 June 2011	France	1 – 1 (1 – 3 p)	Colombia	Stade Mayol, Toulon
21:00 CEST	Joseph-Monrose 50'	Report	Zapata 75'	Referee: Andrea De Marco (Italy)
	Penalties
	Le Tallec (penalty missed); Pogba (penalty missed); Duplus (penalty scored); Jarsalé (penalty missed)		(penalty scored) Rodríguez; (penalty scored) Murillo; (penalty missed) Franco; (penalty scored) Candelo

Unofficial Friendly

8 July 2011	France	6 – 2 (Note: Match was played in three 40-minute halves.)	France Military	Stade du Gros Murger, Aime
17:30 CEST	Sunu 14' (pen.), 38'; Bakambu 38'; Griezmann 40'; Nego 20'; Tafer 24'	Report	Mihoubi 31'; Bouataress 35'

12 July 2011	France	3 – 0	(France) Nantes	Stade Eric Cantona, Tignes
18:00 CET	Tafer 60', 104'; Reale 68'	Report

Friendly

18 July 2011	France	2 – 0	Equatorial Guinea	Stade Eric Cantona, Tignes
18:30 CET	Griezmann 45' (pen.); Sunu 48'	Report

2011 FIFA U-20 World Cup

Group stage 30 July 2011	Colombia	4 – 1	France	Estadio El Campín, Bogotá
20:00 UTC-5	Rodríguez 30' (pen.); Muriel 48', 66'; Arias 64'	Report	Sunu 21'	Referee: Peter O'Leary (New Zealand)

Group stage 2 August 2011	France	3 – 1	South Korea	Estadio El Campín, Bogotá
17:00 UTC-5	Sunu 27'; Fofana 81'; Lacazette 90+1'	Report	Kim Young-uk 59'	Referee: Wilson Seneme (Brazil)

Group stage 5 August 2011	France	2 – 0	Mali	Estadio Pascual Guerrero, Cali
20:00 UTC-5	Bakambu 70'; Lacazette 77'	Report		Referee: Antonio Arias (Paraguay)

Round of 16; 10 August 2011	France	1 – 0	Ecuador	Estadio Jaime Morón León, Cartagena
20:00 UTC-5	Griezmann 70'	Report		Referee: Kim Dong-Jin (South Korea)

Quarter-finals; 14 August 2011	France	3 – 2 (a.e.t)	Nigeria	Estadio Pascual Guerrero, Cali
15:00 UTC-5	Lacazette 50', 104'; Fofana 102'	Report	Ejike 90+3', 111'	Attendance: 33,007; Referee: Darío Ubriaco (Uruguay)

Semi-finals; 17 August 2011	France	0 – 2	Portugal	Estadio Atanasio Girardot, Medellín
17:00 UTC-5		Report	D. Pereira 9'; N. Oliveira 40' (pen.)	Referee: Cüneyt Çakır (Turkey)

Third Place Match; 20 August 2011	Mexico	3 – 1	France	Estadio Nemesio Camacho (El Campín), Bogotá
17:00 UTC-5	Dávila 12'; Enríquez 49'; Rivera 71'	Report	Lacazette 8'	Referee: Antonio Arias (Paraguay)

Last updated: 20 August 2011
Source: French Football Federation

=== France U-19 ===
2010 Sendai Cup

9 September 2010	Japan	2 – 1	France	Sendai Stadium, Sendai
13:30 CET	9'; 43'	Report	Derouard 27' (pen.)	Referee: TBD

11 September 2010	France	2 – 1	China	Sendai Stadium, Sendai
16:00 CET	Novillo 2', 87'	Report	Goal	Referee: TBD

12 September 2010	France	2 – 2	Brazil	Sendai Stadium, Sendai
16:00 CET	Sanogo 9'; Belfodil 70' (pen.)	Report	23'; 40'	Referee: TBD

2011 UEFA European Under-19 Football Championship qualification

First Round; 8 October 2010	France	3 – 0	San Marino	Sportzentrum AUG, Seekirchen
15:30 CET	Derouard 21'; Saadi 66'; Mignon 90+2'	Report		Referee: Vassilios Pamporidis (Greece)

10 October 2010	France	2 – 0	Montenegro	Untersberg Arena, Grödig
13:00 CET	Kebano 17'; Derouard 42'	Report		Referee: Viktor Shvetsov (Ukraine)

13 October 2010	Austria	0 – 1	France	Untersberg Arena, Grödig
18:30 CET		Report	Belfodil 26'	Referee: Lars Christoffersen (Denmark)

Friendly

9 February 2011	France	1 – 1	Netherlands	Stade Pierre-Paul Bernard, Talence
15:00 CET	Turan 7'	Report	91'

23 March 2011	France	0 – 1	Switzerland	Complexe Sportif de Molsheim, Molsheim
18:30 CET		Report	Seferovic 30'

Porto Tournament

19 April 2011	Russia	0 – 0	France	Estádio do Trofense, Trofa
17:00 CET		Report

20 April 2011	France	1 – 0	Spain	Estádio Municipal 25 de Abril, Penafiel
17:00 CET	Rose 43'	Report

22 April 2011	Portugal	1 – 0	France	Estádio do Mar Matosinhos, Matosinhos
12:30 CEST	Barros 26'	Report

2011 UEFA European Under-19 Football Championship Elite Round qualification

Elite Round; 20 May 2011	France	2 – 0	Belarus	NTC Senec, Veľký Biel
15:00 CEST	Derouard 25'; Taïder 35'	Report		Referee: Jakob Kehlet (Denmark)

Elite Round; 22 May 2011	France	1 – 2	Greece	NTC Senec, Veľký Biel
15:00 CEST	Taïder 21'	Report	Vellios 25'; Rougkalas 47'	Referee: Anar Salmanov (Azerbaijan)

Elite Round; 25 May 2011	Slovakia	0 – 2	France	Slovak FA Centre, Senec
11:00 CEST		Report	Situ 64'; Derouard 79' (pen.)	Referee: Deniz Aytekin (Germany)

Last updated: 25 May 2011
Source: French Football Federation

=== France U-18 ===
Friendly

24 August 2010	Denmark	0 – 2	France	Farum Park, Farum
19:00 CET		Report	Koura 12'; Varane 80'

26 August 2010	Denmark	2 – 3	France	Gladsaxe Stadium, Gladsaxe
19:00 CET	(pen.)	Report	Sorin 45'; Koura 51'; Omrani 55'

Tournio de Limoges

27 October 2010	France	4 – 1	Greece	Stade Beaublanc, Limoges
19:00 CET	Deligny 17'; Bahebeck 32', 68'; A. Doucoure 50'	Report	Kolovos 10'	Referee: Philippe Chat (France)

29 October 2010	France	2 – 0	Russia	Stade Beaublanc, Limoges
18:30 CET	Bahebeck 69'; Salaby 90+1'	Report

31 October 2010	France	1 – 1	Belgium	Stade Beaublanc, Limoges
18:00 CET	Komdogbia 88'	Report	Lallemand 64'

Winter Tournament

13 December 2010	Israel	0 – 2	France	Kfar Saba Stadium, Kfar Saba
18:35 CET		Report	Koura 70'; Honoré 79'

14 December 2010	United States	0 – 3	France	Ramat HaSharon Stadium, Ramat HaSharon
16:00 CET		Report	Obin 20'; Kondogbia 55'; Plea 88'

16 December 2010	France	1 – 2	Germany	Ra'anana Stadium, Ra'anana
13:00 CET	Kondogbia 90+1'	Report	Mendler 10', 17'

Friendly

25 January 2011	Belgium	1 – 3	France	Henri Houtsaegerstadion Stadium, Koksijde
19:00 CET	Ferreira 5'	Report	Kondogbia 40'; Honoré 48' (pen.), 80'

27 January 2011	Belgium	2 – 2	France	Municipal Stadium, Oostduinkerke
19:00 CET	Van de Walle 7'; Hendricks 90+3'	Report	Veretout 12'; Doucoure 45'

Friendly

22 March 2011	Germany	3 – 2	France	Sportpark Heimstetten, Heimstetten
18:00 CET	Younes 35'; Kittel 90+1'; Rüdiger 90+2'	Report	Kondogbia 24'; Gouano 38'

24 March 2011	Germany	1 – 2	France	TBD, Prien am Chiemsee
11:30 CET	Mendler 68'	Report	Veretout 77'; Pogba 84'

Friendly

10 May 2011	Switzerland	2 – 1	France	Stade Brühl de Granges, Granges
18:00 CEST	Kleiber 13'; Miani 62'	Report	Huston 5'

12 May 2011	Switzerland	0 – 0	France	Stade Universitaire Saint-Léonard, Fribourg
18:30 CEST		Report

Last updated: 12 May 2011
Source: French Football Federation

=== France U-17 ===
Serbia Tournament

24 August 2010	Serbia	1 – 2	France	Stadion Čika Dača, Kragujevac
17:00 CET	Marković 46'	Report	Nangis 49'; Zouma 90'

25 August 2010	Russia	3 – 0	France	Stadion Čika Dača, Kragujevac
17:00 CET		Report

27 August 2010	France	3 – 0	Greece	Badnjevac Stadium, Badnjevac
15:15 CET	Bedime 26'; Yaisien 34'; Davigny 75'	Report

Friendly

21 September 2010	Finland	0 – 5	France	Tammela Stadion, Tampere
18:30 CET		Report	Nangis 8'; Yaisien 30'; Davigny 69', 76'; Mendy 79'

23 September 2010	Finland	0 – 2	France	Lempäälän Jäähalli, Lempäälä
16:30 CET		Report	Yaisien 25'; Bedime 78'

2011 UEFA European Under-17 Football Championship qualification

First Round; 27 October 2010	France	1 – 0	Slovenia	Geroskipou Municipal Stadium, Paphos
14:00 CET	Yaisien 60'	Report		Referee: Pavle Radovanović (Montenegro

First Round; 29 October 2010	Cyprus	1 – 1	France	Peyia Municipal Stadium, Paphos
14:00 CET	A. Andreou 80+2'	Report	Yaisien 18'	Referee: Pavle Radovanović (Montenegro

First Round; 1 November 2010	Italy	2 – 1	France	Geroskipou Municipal Stadium, Paphos
14:00 CET	Abbraciante 14'; Maggio 78'	Report	Yaisien 65'	Referee: Huw Jones (Wales)

2011 UEFA European Under-17 Football Championship Elite Round qualification

Elite Round; 25 March 2011	France	2 – 0	Georgia	Stade de la Beaujoire, Nantes
19:00 CET	Haller 31'; Yaisien 50'	Report		Referee: Anastasios Sidiropoulos (Greece)

Elite Round; 27 March 2011	Norway	2 – 2	France	Stade Marcel Saupin, Nantes
18:00 CET	Kwoeme 9'; Furu 61'	Report	Haller 13'; Laborde 30'	Referee: Danny Desmond Makkelie (Netherlands)

Elite Round; 30 March 2011	France	9 – 0	Belarus	Stade du Moulin-Boisseau, Carquefou
17:00 CET	Yaisien 14', 35', 39', 68'; Laporte 27'; Nangis 21', 24', 71'; Haller 80+1'	Report		Referee: Szymon Marciniak (Poland)

Friendly

28 April 2011	France	5 – 0	Rwanda	Stade Pierre Pibarot, Clairefontaine-en-Yvelines
17:00 CET	Vercleyen 43'; Laborde 46', 65'; Calvet 59'; Nangis 63'	Report

2011 UEFA European Under-17 Football Championship

3 May 2011	France	2 – 2	England	Stadion Karađorđe, Novi Sad
15:00 CEST	Haller 15', 65'	Report	Hope 8'; Powell 28'	Referee: Liran Liany (Israel

6 May 2011	Serbia	1 – 1	France	Stadion FK Inđija, Inđija
15:00 CEST	Mandić 40'	Report	Meité 40+1'	Referee: Stavros Tritsonis (Greece)

9 May 2011	Denmark	1 – 0	France	Stadion Karađorđe, Novi Sad
17:15 CEST	Nørgaard 65'	Report		Referee: Artur Soares Dias (Portugal)

Friendly

1 June 2011	France	2 – 2	Congo	Stade de l'Abbé-Deschamps, Auxerre
16:00 CEST	Nangis 1', 27'	Report	Tchibota 19'; Sitou 46'

2011 FIFA U-17 World Cup

Group stage 18 June 2011	France	3 – 0	Argentina	Estadio Universitario, Monterrey
15:00 CEST	Benzia 35', 45'; Haller 38'	Report		Attendance: 16,200; Referee: Roberto García Orozco (Mexico)

Group stage 21 June 2011	Japan	1 – 1	France	Estadio Universitario, Monterrey
15:00 CEST	Ishige 49' (pen.)	Report	Yaisien 24'	Attendance: 4,827; Referee: Víctor Hugo Carrillo (Peru)

Group stage 24 June 2011	Jamaica	1 – 1	France	Estadio Universitario, Monterrey
15:00 CEST	Lewis 9'	Report	Benzia 58'	Referee: Hélder Martins de Carvalho (Angola)

Round of 16; 30 June 2011	France	3 – 2	Ivory Coast	Estadio Corregidora, Querétaro
18:00 CEST	Benzia 37' (pen.), 74'; Nangis 65'	Report	S. Coulibaly 3'; Diarrassouba 25'	Referee: Elmer Bonilla (El Salvador)

Quarterfinals; 4 July 2011	France	1 – 2	Mexico	Estadio Hidalgo, Pachuca
18:00 CEST	Ikoko 17'	Report	Escamilla 14'; Fierro 50'	Referee: Ali Al Badwawi (United Arab Emirates)

Last updated: 4 July 2011
Source: French Football Federation

=== France U-16 ===
Friendly

21 September 2010	France	3 – 0	Belgium	Stade Amédée Domenech, Brive-la-Gaillarde
19:00 CET	Martial 64'; Cyprien 72'; Lambese 73'	Report

23 September 2010	France	2 – 0	Belgium	Stade Alexandre Cueille, Tulle
19:00 CET	Kayaci 45', 83'	Report

Tournio du Val-de-Marne

26 October 2010	France	1 – 2	Netherlands	Stade Gabriel Péri, Vitry-sur-Seine
16:00 CET	Valcy 54'	Report	Aké 21'; Kishner 41'	Attendance: 300; Referee: Marco Ferreira (Portugal)

28 October 2010	France	2 – 1	Norway	Stade Auguste Delaune, Maisons-Alfort
16:00 CET	Plumain 40', 80'	Report	Stengel 48'

30 October 2010	France	4 – 0	Portugal	Complexe Sportif Léo-Lagrange, Bonneuil-sur-Marne
16:00 CET	Brunard 30'; Martial 40', 50'; Labidi 70'	Report

Friendly

7 December 2010	Wales	1 – 3	France	The Gnoll, Neath
17:00 CET	35'	Report	Martial 31'; Begue 80'; Bambock 85'

9 December 2010	Wales	2 – 6	France	Stebonheath Park, Llanelli
20:00 CET	Bambock; Ongenda; Cyprien; Martial	Report	Goal

2011 Aegean Cup

Group stage 24 January 2011	France	4 – 3	Belgium	Akhisar Belediye, Akhisar
12:00 CET	Martial 39'; Ongenda 62', 68'; Saïd 65'	Report	Goal

Group stage 25 January 2011	France	4 – 1	Czech Republic	Turgutlu 7 Eylül, Manisa
12:00 CET	Saïd 2', 22'; Ongenda 44'; Brunard 82'	Report	12'

Group stage 27 January 2011	France	2 – 0	Switzerland	Soma Atatürk, Atatürk
13:00 CET	Ongenda 6', 47'	Report

Final; 29 January 2011	Turkey	1 – 5	France	Manisa 19 Mayis, Manisa
13:00 CET	İbrahim 63'	Report	Ongenda 10'; Saïd 36'; Labidi 48'; Brunard 61'; Martial 78'

Friendly

15 March 2011	Switzerland	0 – 4	France	Stade des Trois-Chênes, Chêne-Bourg
18:30 CET		Report	Labidi 27'; Saïd 31', 46'; Begue 73'

17 March 2011	Switzerland	2 – 2	France	Stade de la Fontenette, Carouge
18:30 CET	67'; 78'	Report	Brunard 17'; Labidi 42'

5 April 2011	Slovenia	0 – 0	France	Slovenska Bistrica Sports Park, Slovenska Bistrica
16:30 CET		Report

7 April 2011	Slovenia	0 – 0	France	Slovenska Bistrica Sports Park, Slovenska Bistrica
16:30 CET		Report

2011 Montaigu Tournament

Group stage 20 April 2011	France	4 – 0	Japan	Stade Maxime Bossis, Montaigu
18:30 CET	Castelletto 34'; Martial 35'; Labidi 40'; Saïd 80'	Report

Group stage 21 April 2011	France	2 – 1	United States	Stade Maxime Bossis, Montaigu
18:30 CET	Fofana 80+2'; Saïd 80+3'	Report	80'

Group stage 23 April 2011	France	0 – 0	Portugal	Stade Maxime Bossis, Montaigu
15:30 CET		Report

Final; 25 April 2011	France	0 – 0 (3 – 4 p)	England	Stade Maxime Bossis, Montaigu
17:30 CET		Report

Friendly

25 May 2011	Germany	2 – 1	France	Olympic Stadium, Berlin
11:00 CET	Benkarit 25'; Hilßner 69'	Report	Saïd 80+1'

Last updated: 25 May 2011
Source: French Football Federation
