= Charles Jean d'Hector =

French naval officer (1722–1808)

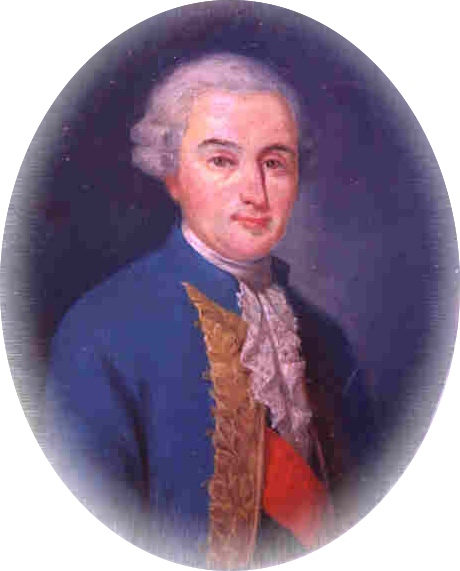
Portrait of Hector

Charles Jean d'Hector, comte d'Hector (22 July 1722, Fontenay-le-Comte, France – 18 August 1808, Reading, Berkshire, United Kingdom) was a French aristocrat and naval officer. Losing his father at a young age, he soon entered the French Navy, starting his service during the Seven Years' War, notably at the battle of Quiberon Bay. Following that battle he and the chevalier de Ternay saved part of the French fleet which had taken refuge in the Vilaine estuary. He was promoted to capitaine de vaisseau then squadron commander at the start of the American Revolutionary War. Put in command of Brest and its naval force, he assisted the Naval Minister maréchal de Castries in his plans to reform the fleet. He was visited at Brest by the future Tsar Nicholas I of Russia and his family and at Cherbourg on an inspection by Louis XVI of France.

He ended his career at the rank of lieutenant general. He emigrated to Britain upon the French Revolution and - despite his lack of funds - raised a volunteer regiment known as the Régiment Hector ou Marine Royale. This took part in the Quiberon Expedition in 1795. He died in exile in England aged 86.

== Life ==
=== Early life ===
The Hector family was a noble family originating in Quercy (now in Poitou) and it is first recorded in 1666. It owned the lordships of Tirpoil, Versigay, Marle, Beaumont and Closemont. He was born a sickly child and was speedily baptized in his birthplace since it was thought he would not survive the journey to church. His father, a naval officer, was killed in Canada in 1731. After attending primary school at Saint-Georges-de-Montaigu, he moved to Rochefort and there became a cadet aged 13 on 16 May 1735. He took part in several campaigns before becoming a garde-marine at Rochefort on 1 January 1741. He was promoted to 'aide d'artillerie' on 1 January 1746 before opting to join the navy instead on 1 July 1750. He was made a lieutenant de vaisseau on 11 February 1756 and the same year was put in command of the 30-gun frigate Pomone.

=== Seven Years' War ===
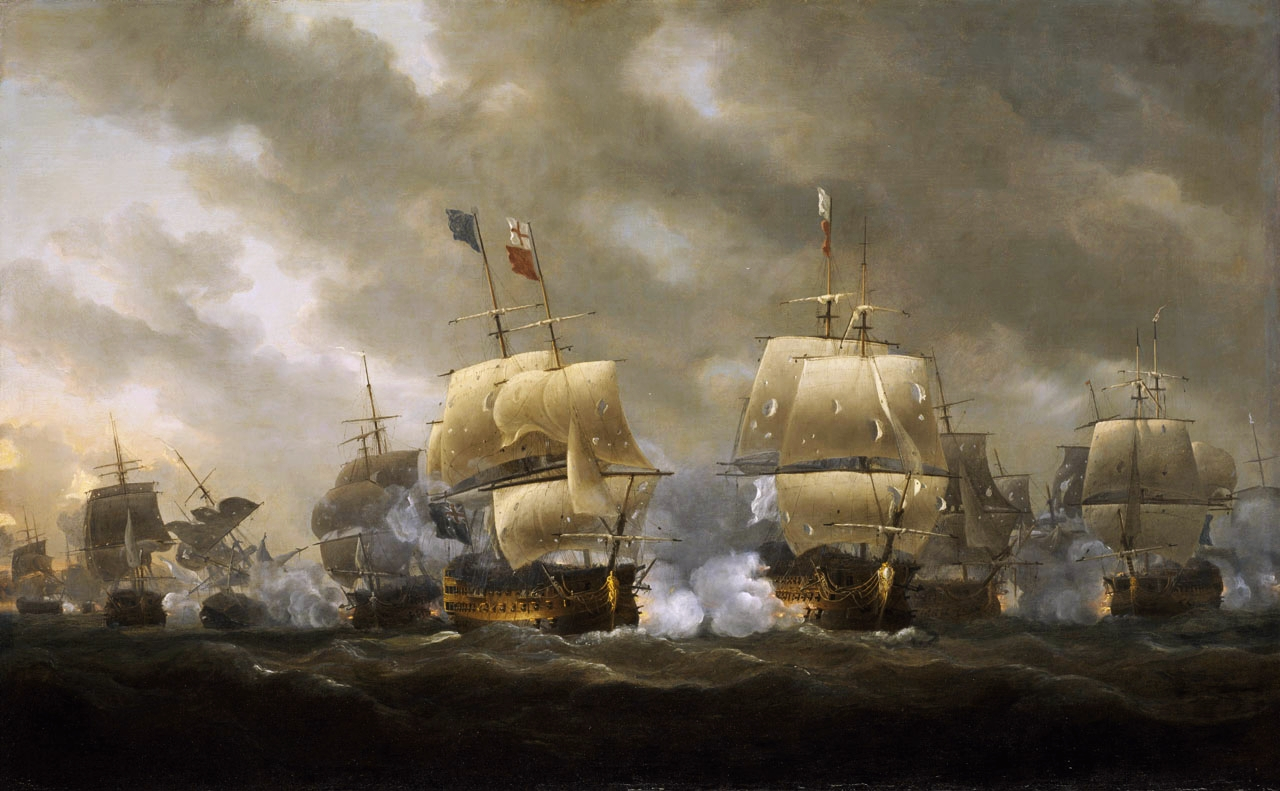
The Battle of Quiberon Bay, Nicholas Pocock, 1812. National Maritime Museum

After hunting Barbary pirates off the Mediterranean coast, he was made aide-major to the port of Brest on 26 July 1757. In the aftermath of the battle of Quiberon Bay seven French ships of the line and four frigates took advantage of the tide to reach the estuary of the river Vilaine, where they took refuge. Edward Boscawen noted this and blockaded the entrance to the river. Brittany's governor the duc d'Aiguillon tasked the chevalier de Ternay with breaking the blockade, but de Ternay would only accept the mission if he was accompanied by the count of Hector. Together they managed to defeat Boscawen and break out the Brillant and the Éveillé. For this the count of Hector was made a knight of the Order of Saint Louis in 1760 and promoted to capitaine de vaisseau on 15 January 1762.

On 24 February 1772 he married Marie-Jacquette de Kerouartz, widow of Alain-François Le Borgne de Keruzoret, chef d'escadre. Her sisters all also married naval officers - Amédée-Françoise de Kerouartz on 18 April 1768 to the future contre-amiral Claude-René Pâris, comte de Soulanges, and Hortense in April 1769 to the future contre-amiral Paul-Jules de la Porte-Vezins.

=== American Revolutionary War ===
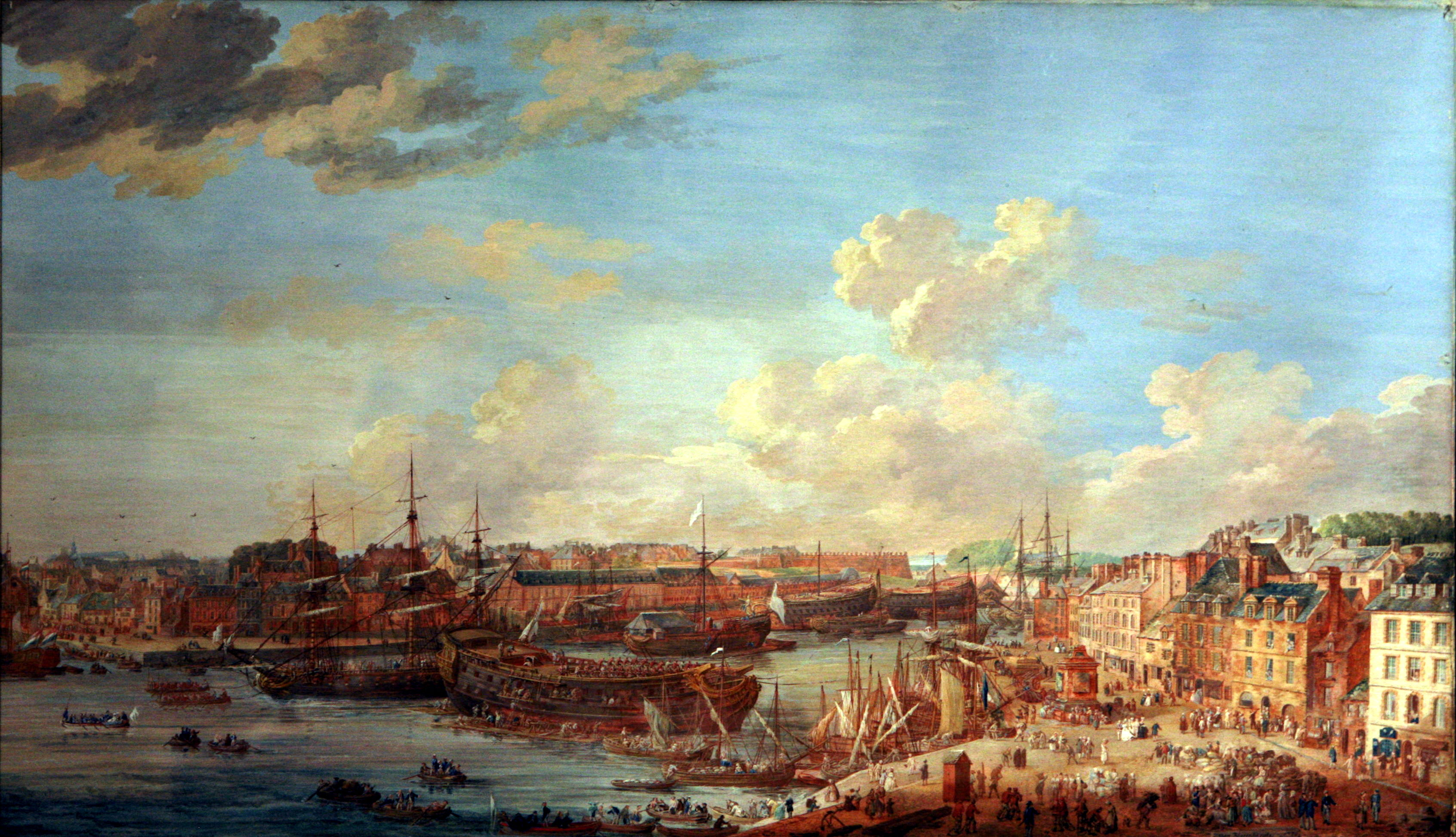
D'Hector commanded Brest until the French Revolution.

In 1778, commanding the 74 gun Orient, d'Hector fought at the indecisive battle of Ushant on 27 July 1778. Although he was unable to influence its outcome, he was congratulated by the comte d'Orvillers. A few months later, on 4 May 1779, he was made chef d'escadre. He was then put in supreme command of the port of Brest on 23 December 1779. He played an essential part in Brest's role in the American Revolutionary War.

On 1 February 1781 he was made Commandant de la Marine for the Brest department, succeeding the comte de Guichen. When the duc de Castries prepared his famous Ordonnances sur la Marine, d'Hector's knowledge and combat experience proved useful and de Castries wrote him several letters about maritime administration, using ports, shipbuilding and on personnel with combat experience. During this time d'Hector lived at the château de Lézarazzieu, near Landivisiau.

On 22 October 1780 the Naval Minister wrote to d'Hector, stating "The confidence which I know is your due will perhaps seem a burden in that I give you an excess of it, but, as it is only in the King's service, I do not think that you will find it indiscrete." At the request of the duc de Castries he was promoted to lieutenant general on 14 August 1782 and granted the red sash of the Order of St Louis (with a 3000 livres pension from the Order) on 1 January 1782, two promotions which made his fellow general officers jealous.

The baronne d'Oberkirch visited Brest in June 1782 with the future Tsar Paul I and his wife Maria Feodorovna. There d'Hector informed her of these grudges. (Note: "They did not confine themselves to asking him whether he was the grandson of Priam or of the Valet de Carreau; He was accused of having lacked value in battle, and of not having put on his uniform that day and so to be less distinguished. They cited the example of the Count d'Estaing, who was accused of being furious; Finally, he was invited to the courage and surrender, to command a new branch of Hector. These complaints, so profoundly unjust, impressed neither the future Paul, nor the future Tsarina."(Havard 1911–1913, p. 28)) Neither Paul nor Louis XVI took attention to the complaints - de Castries invited d'Hector and commandant d'Albert de Rions to receive the king at Cherbourg and inform him about shipbuilding and the necessity of building of coastal defences in Normandy against the British. On his departure from Cherbourg, Louis made d'Hector inspector of the main naval fortresses and charged him with submitting a plan for reforms to unify and coordinate the commands along the coast. In 1785 he contributed to the preparations for the La Perouse Expedition.

=== Emigration ===
On the outbreak of the French Revolution he asked to be dismissed on 24 May 1790 thanks to the hostility he encountered from the city authorities in Brest. He moved to Koblenz in February 1791 and there was put in command of the Corps de la marine royale, solely made up of naval officers. With few funds, he appealed to the tsar of Russia, who sent funds twice. (Note: "When the Earl of Hector, reduced during the emigration to the most cruel distress, thought it his duty to appeal to the memory of the Emperor and the Empress, a first assistance of six thousand francs and a second of eight thousand, accompanied by the most obliging letters, attested to the survival of an esteem which compensated the old sailor for his disappointments." (Havard 1911–1913, p. 28)) The royalist princes made him a vice admiral on 1 January 1792.

The corps was disbanded at the end of the campaign but re-formed in October 1794 in Britain, with d'Hector its colonel once again. He raised it from 600 sailors who had fled France and called it the Régiment Hector. It was sent to Brittany to assist the Quiberon Expedition but learnt of its failure on 21 July 1793 during its voyage out. D'Hector was now 73 and "had to renounce the hope of dying on the battlefield". He retired to a house near Reading, Berkshire and died there aged 86 on 18 August 1808.

== Later assessments ==
Constant Merland dans ses Biographie vendéennes (1884) dit de lui:

Naturellement obligeant, si son premier mouvement était un peu vif, il le corrigeait toujours par les bonnes grâces de ses manières, sachant parler et se taire à propos. La justesse de son esprit et un grand sens remplaçaient ce qui lui faisait défaut du côté de l'éducation première. Lorsqu'il fut arrivé aux postes les plus élevés, il aimait à se rappeler les années si dures de sa jeunesse et disait aux officiers qui se plaignaient des rigueurs du destin : « Messieurs, on naît avec une fortune de bonheur et de malheur. Pendant vingt-deux ans, si je passais par une porte cochère, j'étais toujours prêt à me casser la jambe. Après, tout semblait seconder mes vœux. Si je ne m'étais pas raidi contre les premières malchances, je n'aurais pas l'honneur d'être à votre tête, Messieurs, et de vous commander. Faites comme moi ! »

== Sources ==
=== Bibliography ===
- Michel Vergé-Franceschi (November 1996), Sedes (ed.), La Marine française au XVIIIe siècle: guerres, administration, exploration, SEDES, ISBN 978-2718195032
- Vergé-Franceschi, Michel (2002), éditions Robert Laffont (ed.), Dictionnaire d'Histoire maritime, R. Laffont, ISBN 2-221-08751-8
- Meyer, Jean; Acerra, Martine (1994), éditions Ouest-France (ed.), Histoire de la marine française: des origines à nos jours, Rennes, ISBN 2-7373-1129-2
- Étienne Taillemite (2002), éditions Tallandier (ed.), Dictionnaire des marins français, Paris, ISBN 2-84734-008-4
- Zysberg, André (2002), Point Seuil (ed.), Nouvelle Histoire de la France moderne, vol. 5: La monarchie des Lumières, 1715–1786
- Jean-Christian Petitfils (2005), éditions Perrin (ed.), Louis XVI
- Le Moing, Guy (May 2011), Marines Éditions (ed.), Les 600 plus grandes batailles navales de l'Histoire, Rennes, ISBN 9782357430778, OCLC 743277419
- Merland, Constant (1884), Mellinet (ed.), Biographies vendéennes, Nantes
- Havard, Oscar (1911–1913), Nouvelle Librairie nationale (ed.), Histoire de la Révolution dans les ports de guerre: Brest, Rochefort, vol. 2: Brest, Paris, pp. 25–28
- J. Forest ainé, ed. (1879), Revue de Bretagne et de Vendée, vol. 45, Paris, pp. 51 et suivantes
- Les papiers personnels du Comte d'Hector sont conservés aux Archives nationales sous la cote 296AP
- "Histoire de la Vendée du Bas Poitou en France, Chapitre XL : " Illustrations vendéennes des 18e et 19e siècles "". histoiredevendee.com. histoirevendée.
