= Claude-René Pâris de Soulanges =

French aristocrat and naval officer

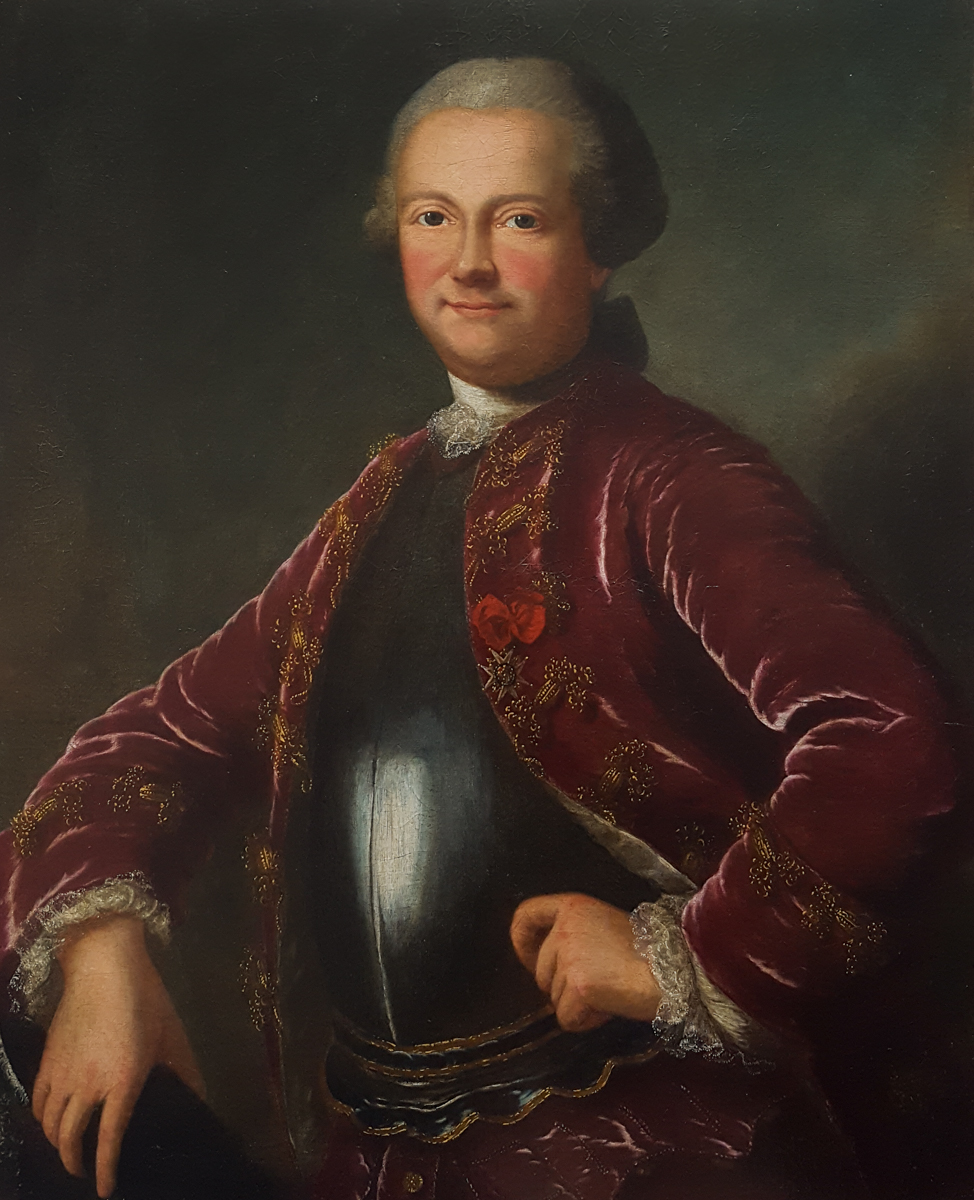

Claude-René Pâris de Soulanges (French pronunciation: [klod ʁəne pɑʁi də sulɑ̃ʒ]; 18 August 1736 - 31 July 1795) was a French aristocrat and naval officer. He was lord of Preuille and the last count of Soulanges.

== Family ==
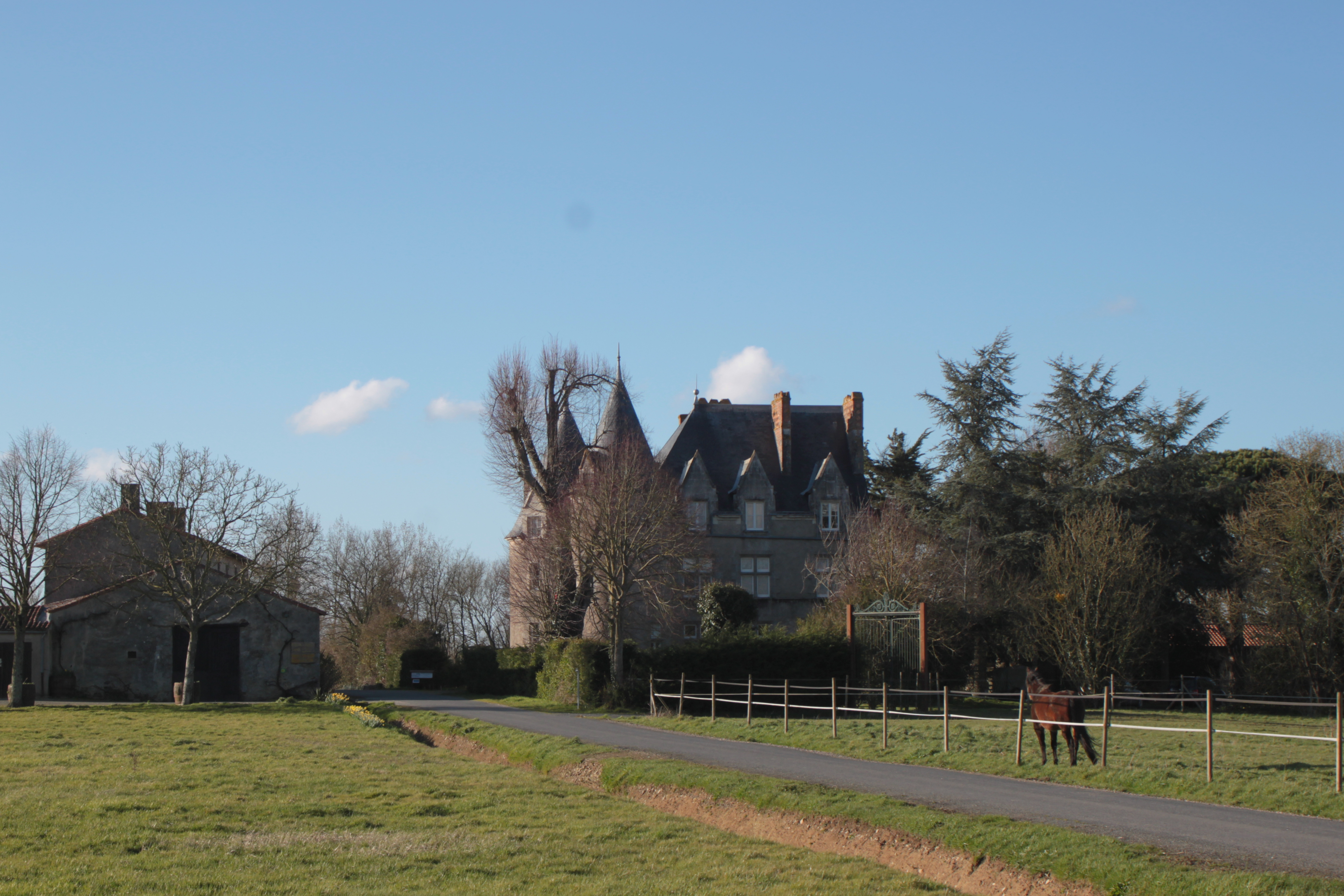
The Château de la Preuille

He was descended from the family of the lords of Soulanges, a fiefdom near Ancenis in the diocese of Nantes in Brittany. The Pâris family originated either in England or the Flanders plain and gave its name to a château in Basse-Bretagne.

Claude-René was born in the château de la Preuille, Saint-Hilaire-de-Loulay, Vendée, the eldest son of Claude-Louis Pâris, knight and lord of Soulanges, and his wife, Françoise de Gatinaire, daughter of Claude de Gatinaire, lord of Gatinaire and Preville, and Marguerite Merisson. His parents had married on 28 May 1728 at the château de la Preuille. Claude-René's brother-in-law was count Charles Jean d'Hector (1722-1808), the pre-revolutionary commander of the French naval force at Brest.

== Life ==
=== Seven Years' War ===
He joined a Gardes de la Marine company at Rochefort in 1751. He was promoted to enseigne de vaisseau in 1755, then lieutenant de vaisseau in 1761. He was made a knight of the ordre royal et militaire de Saint-Louis in 1762. On 13 August 1755, at the château de Lieuzel, he married Hyacinthe-Gabrielle de Cornouailles de Saint-George (1736 - 11 July 1764).

=== American War of Independence ===
He was made a captain and a lieutenant of the company of gardes de la Marine and of the pavillon in the département of Rochefort in 1772. He was given his commission as a capitaine de vaisseau on 4 April 1777, a year before France entered the American War of Independence. He joined the fleet gathering at Brest in 1778 under the comte d'Orvilliers, commanding the 64-gun Sphinx at the battle of Ushant on 27 July. He was given permission to marry again after his first wife's death and did so on 3 May 1778 to Émilie-Françoise de Kerouartz, which whom he had one child, Claudine, who married Jacques-Nicolas Le Forestier de Kerosven, comte de Boiséon (+1795) then Dominique-François Fourrier de Nacquard (with issue).

In spring 1780 he fought in the Antilles campaign under the comte de Guichen. On 17 April at the battle of Martinique, still in command of the Sphinx, he formed part of the French rearguard which faced George Brydges Rodney's British fleet. By brevet of 9 May 1781 he was granted an 800 livre pension from the order of Saint-Louis.

He was put in command of the naval squadron at Toulon on 14 January 1785 and director of the ports and arsenals there around the same time.

In 1786, Pâris served as Chef d'escadre in the 12-ship Escadre d'évolution, on the frigate Félicité. He was at Cherbourg when a naval review and a simulated naval battle took place as Louis XVI visited the harbour.

He was made a contre-amiral on 28 January 1792 but on 16 December the same year he emigrated to Britain after the French Revolution.

=== Armée des Princes ===
He was made a lieutenant colonel in the régiment d'Hector during the Quiberon Expedition. He was wounded in action on 16 July 1795 and shot by firing squad with 55 of his men at Auray near Vannes on 31 July that year.

== Sources and references ==
Notes

Citations

References

- Lacour-Gayet, Georges (1905). La marine militaire de la France sous le règne de Louis XVI. Paris: Honoré Champion. OCLC 763372623.
- Troude, Onésime-Joachim (1867). Batailles navales de la France (in French). Vol. 2. Challamel ainé. OCLC 836362484.
- Baptiste Levoir, Marie-Anne Pirez, Isabelle Roy, Les Paris, page 48
- Pierre-Bruno-Jean de La Monneraye, Philippe Bonnichon, Souvenirs de 1760 à 1791, Librairie Droz, 1998, p. 132 - 505 pages
