= Le Borgne =

Le Borgne or Leborgne is a French surname, which means "the one-eyed". The name may refer to:

- Alain-François Le Borgne de Keruzoret (born 1706–1771), French naval officer
- Alexandre Le Borgne de Belle-Isle (1640–1693), French colonial governor
- Andréa Le Borgne (born 2006), French footballer
- Emmanuel Le Borgne (1610–1675), French colonial governor
- Guy Le Borgne (1920–2007), French general
- Jordan Leborgne (born 1995), French football player
