= Montaigu-Vendée =

- Commune
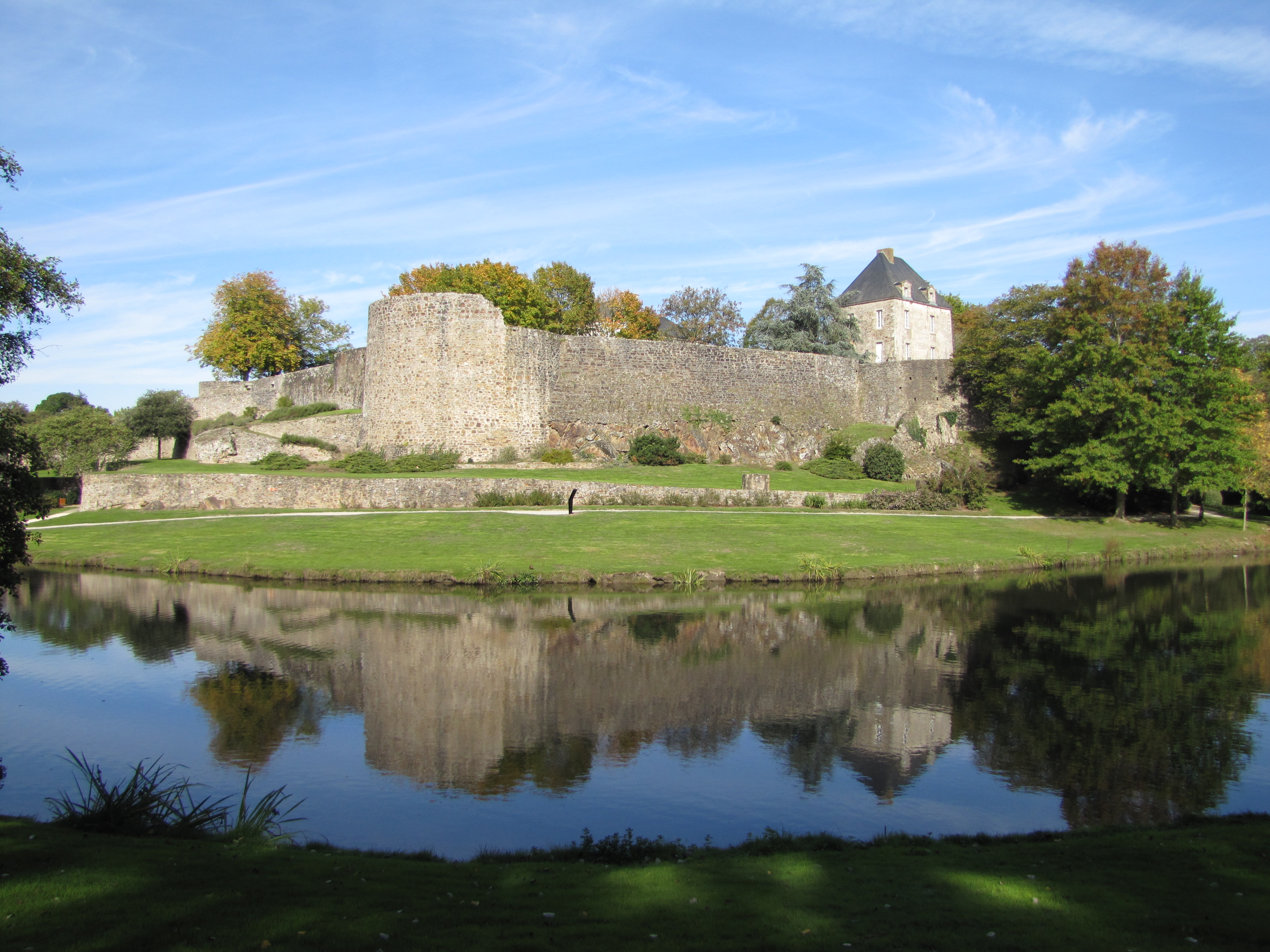
- The Château de Montaigu
- Location of Montaigu-Vendée
- Location within France Location within Pays de la Loire
- Coordinates: 46°58′27″N 1°18′49″W
- Country: France
- Region: Pays de la Loire
- Department: Vendée
- Arrondissement: La Roche-sur-Yon
- Canton: Montaigu-Vendée
- Intercommunality: CA Terres de Montaigu

Government
  - Mayor (2020–2026): Florent Limouzin
- Area^{1}: 117.92 km^{2} (45.53 sq mi)
- Highest elevation: 84 m (276 ft)
- Lowest elevation: 13 m (43 ft)
- Population (2023): 21,134
  - Density: 179.22/km^{2} (464.19/sq mi)
- Time zone: UTC+01:00 (CET)
  - Summer (DST): UTC+02:00 (CEST)
- INSEE/Postal code: 85146 /85600
- ^{1} French Land Register data, which excludes lakes, ponds, glaciers > 1 km^{2} (0.386 sq mi or 247 acres) and river estuaries.

Montaigu-Vendée (French pronunciation: [mɔ̃tɛɡy vɑ̃de]) is a commune in the Vendée department in the Pays de la Loire region in western France. The municipality was established on 1 January 2019 by the merger of the communes of Boufféré, La Guyonnière, Montaigu, Saint-Georges-de-Montaigu and Saint-Hilaire-de-Loulay.

== History ==
The Hôtel de Ville

The Hôtel de Ville was completed in around 1866.

== Population ==
Populations of the area corresponding with the commune of Montaigu-Vendée at 1 January 2025.

Historical population
Year	Pop.	±% p.a.
1968	9,057	—
1975	11,142	+3.00%
1982	12,474	+1.63%
1990	13,736	+1.21%
1999	15,562	+1.40%
2007	17,925	+1.78%
2012	19,383	+1.58%
2017	20,126	+0.76%
2023	21,134	+0.82%
INSEE

== See also ==
- Communes of the Vendée department
