= Saint-Georges-de-Montaigu =

- Part of Montaigu-Vendée
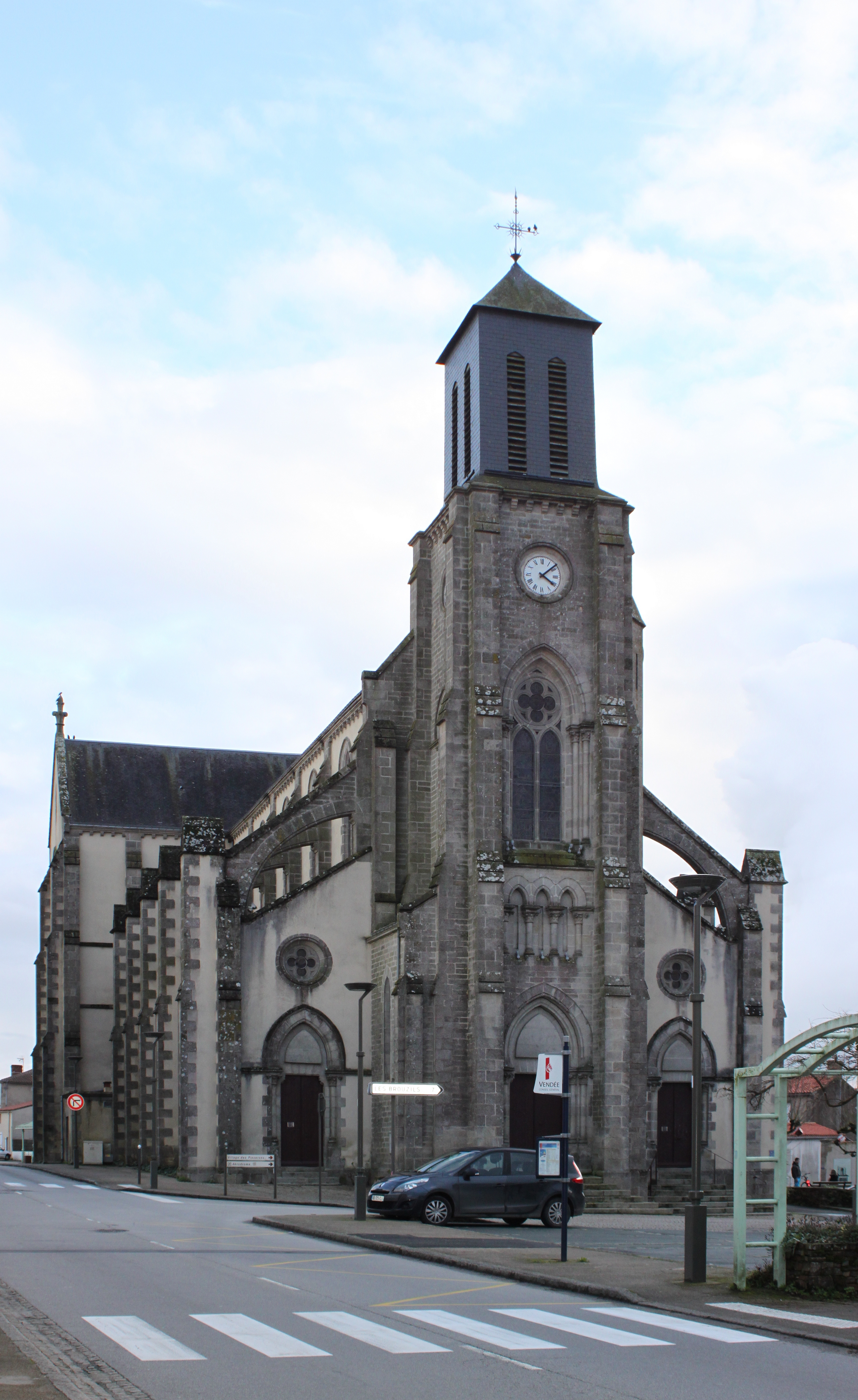
- The church in Saint-Georges-de-Montaigu

- Coat of arms
- Location of Saint-Georges-de-Montaigu
- Location within France Location within Pays de la Loire
- Coordinates: 46°56′52″N 1°17′37″W
- Country: France
- Region: Pays de la Loire
- Department: Vendée
- Arrondissement: La Roche-sur-Yon
- Canton: Montaigu-Vendée
- Commune: Montaigu-Vendée
- Area^{1}: 33.61 km^{2} (12.98 sq mi)
- Highest elevation: 79 m (259 ft)
- Lowest elevation: 27 m (89 ft)
- Population (2022): 4,400
  - Density: 130/km^{2} (340/sq mi)
- Time zone: UTC+01:00 (CET)
  - Summer (DST): UTC+02:00 (CEST)
- Postal code: 85600
- ^{1} French Land Register data, which excludes lakes, ponds, glaciers > 1 km^{2} (0.386 sq mi or 247 acres) and river estuaries.

Saint-Georges-de-Montaigu (French pronunciation: [sɛ̃ ʒɔʁʒ də mɔ̃tɛgy], literally Saint Georges of Montaigu) is a former commune in the Vendée department in the Pays de la Loire region in western France. On 1 January 2019, it was merged into the new commune Montaigu-Vendée.

== See also ==
- Communes of the Vendée department
