= Château de la Preuille =

11th-century castle in Vendée, France

Coordinates: 47°02′16″N 1°20′08″W

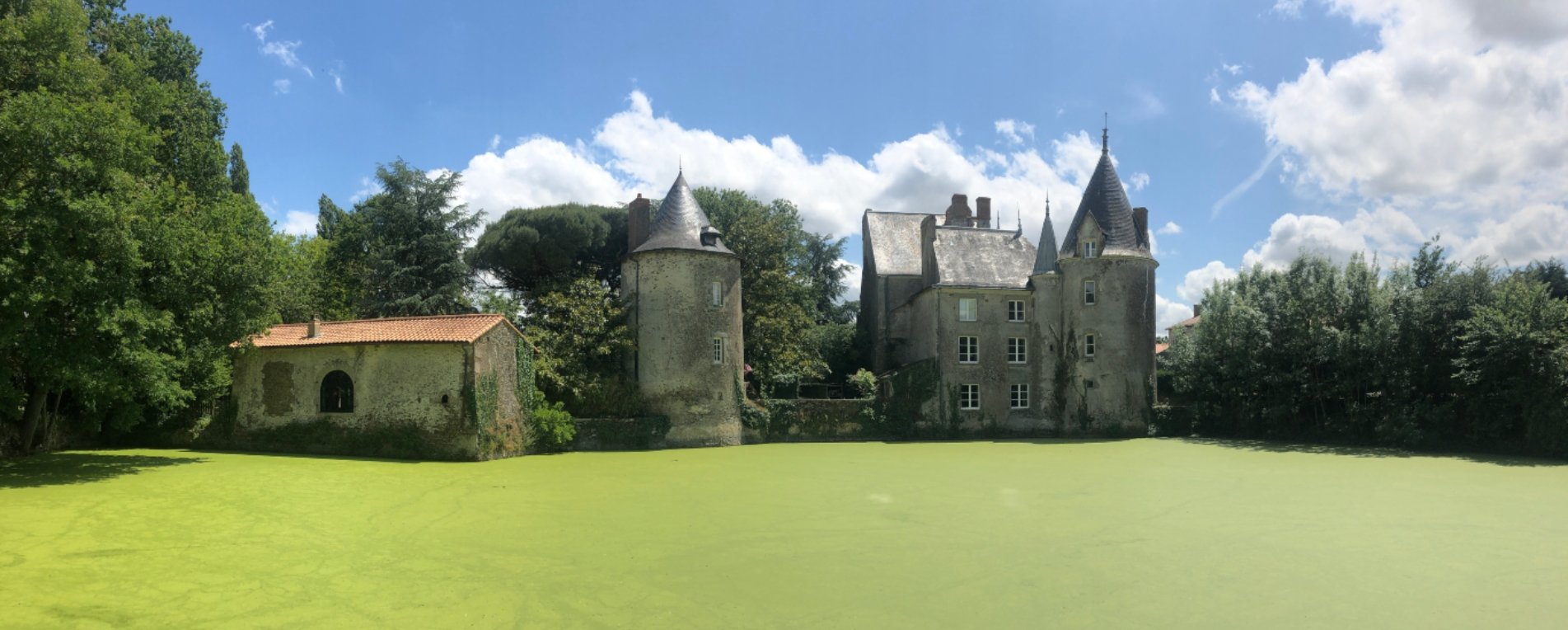
Château de la Preuille

The Château de la Preuille is an 11th-century castle at Saint-Hilaire-de-Loulay, Vendée, France, one of the oldest châteaux in the Loire Valley.

It took its present form in the 13th and 15th centuries. The wide moat defending the northern aspect of the walls and towers indicates its origins as a stronghold. From 1350, the castle was owned successively by the families of Boux, Bastard (1460), Gastiniere (1541), Pâris (including Claude-René Pâris de Soulanges, comte de Soulanges) (1728), and through the late 18th century, the family of D’Nacquart or De Nacquard.

In 1832, Marie-Caroline of Bourbon, Duchess of Berry, visited the château to launch her coup against King Louis-Philippe in order to crown her son Henri, comte de Chambord, the last legitimate Bourbon. The coup failed and Marie-Caroline was arrested.

During the 20th century, the castle was abandoned and was left in a state of disrepair. It was saved and restored by the Fradin family in the 1970s and 1980s. Renovation was continued by the family Ribow between 2003 and 2019.
