= Hector Regiment =

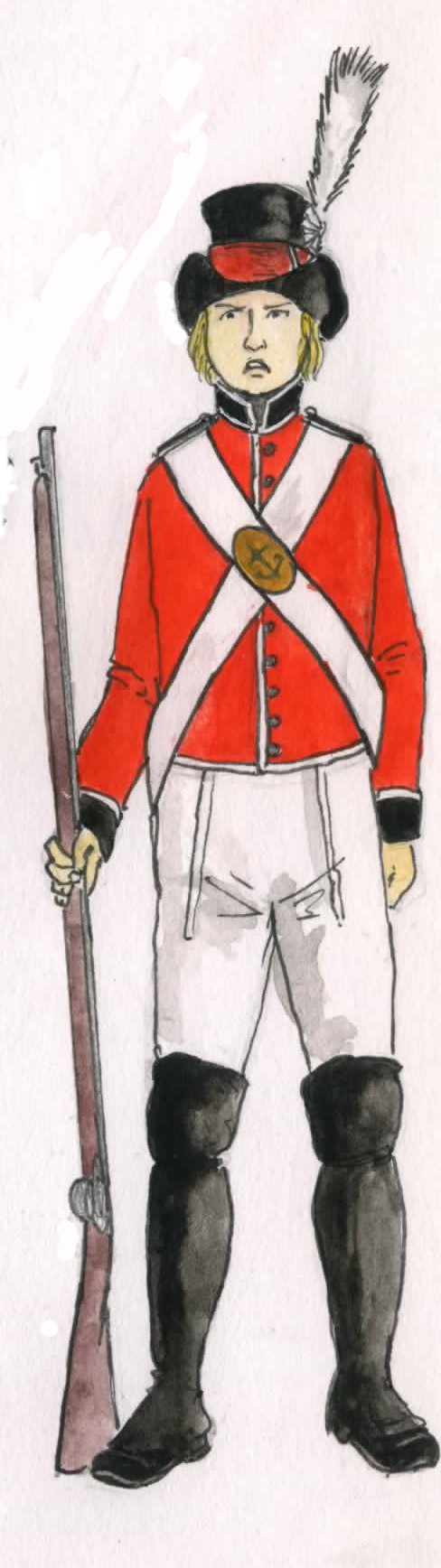
- A soldier of the regiment
- Active: 1794–95, 1797
- Disbanded: 24 October 1795
- Country: Armée des émigrés
- Allegiance: (United Kingdom of Great Britain and Ireland) United Kingdom
- Part of: Armée des émigrés
- Engagements: French Revolutionary Wars; War of the First Coalition; Battle of Quiberon

Commanders
- Notable commanders: Charles Jean d'Hector

The Hector Regiment (French - Régiment Hector, Régiment d'Hector or Marine Royale) was a French Royalist regiment within the Armée des Émigrés during the French Revolutionary Wars.

== History ==
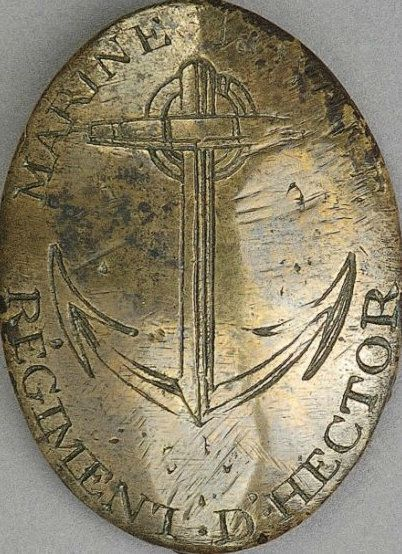
Shoulder belt badge of the regiment

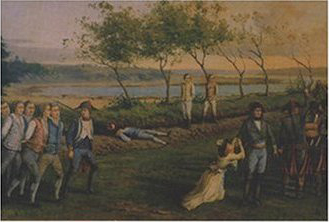
Les fusillés de Vannes by R. de Coueson, 1895.

The naval officer Charles Jean d'Hector (1722-1808) was already an old man when he emigrated to Britain in 1791 to join the royalist forces. There he raised and commanded the 600-man Corps de la marine royale, exclusively made up of old naval officers. During the Quiberon Expedition that unit was known as the 'Régiment Hector' or the 'Marine Royale').

When his regiment was assigned to the Quiberon Expedition it left without its commander but with good morale and discipline, bolstered to 700 men by republican sailors freed from British prisoner-of-war camps and by sailors, officers and prisoners from Toulon and Brittany. However, the majority of its men were still officers from the pre-Revolutionary French Navy.

During its voyage to Brittany it learned of the expedition's failure on 21 July 1795. Reduced to 300 men, the regiment camped at the end of the peninsula. It fought bravely but was overwhelmed by the enemy's numbers.

During and after the expedition, many of its soldiers were shot by Republican firing squads. The regiment's commander the comte de Soulanges was led to Auray at the head of the prisoners from the regiment. Around sixty of them were condemned to death by military tribunals from 27 July onwards and executed from 31 July onwards at Vannes, Auray and Quiberon. A few prisoners managed to escape, including d'Antrechaux and de Chaumareix, the latter of whom went on to command the La Méduse.

It disbanded on 24 October 1795 at the campaign's end but was re-formed two years later in England, again with the comte d'Hector as its colonel. He was now 73 and unable to fight with the unit, dying in Reading, Berkshire in 1808.
