= Hôtel de Ville, Montaigu-Vendée =

Town hall in Montaigu-Vendée, France

Hôtel de Ville
- The main frontage of the Hôtel de Ville in July 2018
- Interactive map of the Hôtel de Ville area

General information
- Type: City hall
- Architectural style: Neoclassical style
- Location: Montaigu-Vendée, France
- Coordinates: 46.9743°N 1.3138°W
- Completed: 1866

The Hôtel de Ville (French pronunciation: [otɛl də vil], City Hall) is a municipal building in Montaigu, Vendée, in western France, standing on Place de l'Hôtel de Ville.

== History ==
Following the French Revolution, the new council of Montaigu initially met in the home of the mayor at the time. This practice continued until 1843 when a municipal office was established within the walls of the ruined Château de Montaigu which dated from the 15th century. In the mid-19th century, the council led by mayor, Armand Trastour, decided to commission several new buildings, including a new town hall, a new school and a new church, the Church of Saint-Jean-Baptiste. Some enabling work was required to facilitate the new buildings and the former château crypt was demolished in around 1850.

The site they selected for the new town hall was at the south end of the newly created Place de l'Hôtel de Ville. It was designed in the neoclassical style, built in rubble masonry with a cement render finish on the upper floors and was completed in 1866.

The design involved a symmetrical main frontage of seven bays facing onto the square. The central section of three bays was three-storey and slightly projected forward, while the wings of two bays each were two-storey. The central section featured a forestair leading up to a doorway with a moulded surround, a keystone and a cornice on the first floor. On the upper floors, the other bays were fenestrated by casement windows with moulded surrounds, keystones and cornices. The bays in the central section were flanked by banded pilasters supporting an entablature, a cornice and, above the central bay, an open pediment and an aedicula containing a clock. Internally, the principal room was the Salle des Mariages (wedding room).

In November 2018, a war memorial in the form of an obelisk surmounted by a cross, which had been installed in the Cemetery of Saint-Jacques in the late 19th century, was relocated to a new position in front of the town hall. The building became the town hall of the enlarged commune after Montaigu amalgamated with four other communes in January 2019.
