= Kerouartz family =

French noble family

Coat of arms of the Kerouartz family

The Kerouartz family is one of the oldest French noble families in Brittany. It originated with the English knight Auralus Houart Miles, sent by the English king in 1164 to assist Conan IV, Duke of Brittany. Auralus built the castle 'Ker-Houart', later renamed 'Kerouartz' - it was initially built in Landéda parish but after being destroyed several times by the English it was re-sited to Lannilis about 3 km away. The castle was seized as national property when the family emigrated during the French Revolution and sold. One of the family's later members was the Royalist naval officer Alain-François Le Borgne de Keruzoret.

== Sources ==
- Image gallica.bnf.fr
