= Abdallah Yaisien =

French professional footballer (born 1994)

Personal information
- Full name: Abdallah Yaisien
- Date of birth: 23 April 1994 (age 32)
- Place of birth: Bondy, France
- Height: 1.73 m (5 ft 8 in)
- Position: Attacking midfielder

Youth career
- 2003–2005: FC Asnières
- 2005–2007: US Clichy-sur-Seine
- 2007–2013: Paris Saint-Germain

Senior career*
Years	Team	Apps	(Gls)
2011–2013	Paris Saint-Germain B	15	(1)
2013–2015	Bologna	0	(0)
2014	→ Trapani (loan)	2	(0)
2015	→ Arezzo (loan)	16	(2)
2016–2017	Lorient B	17	(7)
2017–2019	Paris Saint-Germain B	53	(8)
2019–2022	Al Mokawloon Al Arab	55	(3)
2022–2023	Modern Future	5	(0)
2024	Ansar	15	(3)

International career
2009–2010	France U16	13	(9)
2010–2011	France U17	18	(12)
2011	France U18	3	(0)
2013	France U20	2	(1)
- * Club domestic league appearances and goals as of 29 February 2024

Abdallah Yaisien (Egyptian Arabic: عبدالله ياسين; born 23 April 1994) is a French professional footballer who plays as an attacking midfielder.

== Early life ==
Yaisien was born on 23 April 1994 in Bondy, France, to an Egyptian father who supported Al Ahly and an Algerian mother. He holds both French and Egyptian nationalities. His younger brother Omar Yaisien is an Egypt U20 player.

== Career ==
Yaisien started his career playing at youth team level with Paris Saint-Germain. At only 16 years old Abdallah signed his first professional contract with PSG.

In 2011 he participated to the World Cup in Mexico with the U17 French team. France reached the quarter-finals of the tournament.

Hailed as a promising youngster, he was then signed by Serie A club Bologna during the 2013 summer market but was never featured in the first team and was successively loaned out to Serie B club Trapani in January 2014, where he made only three appearances in the second half of the 2013–14 season.

On 23 January 2015, he accepted a loan deal to Lega Pro club Arezzo until the end of the season. He was released by Bologna at the end of the season.

He signed for FC Lorient in January 2016, being mostly featured with the reserve team.

During season 2016/2017 Abdallah Yaisien played 12 games in the CFA French national league. He scored 7 goals and provided 5 assists.

In July 2017, Yaisien signed a two-year professional contract with Paris Saint-Germain. He left the club at the end of the 2018/19 season.

== International career ==
A youth international for France, Yaisien declared an interest in playing for the Egypt national football team.

== Honours ==
Ansar

- Lebanese FA Cup: 2023–24
