= Sablé FC (France) =

Football club based in Sablé-sur-Sarthe, France

Sablé
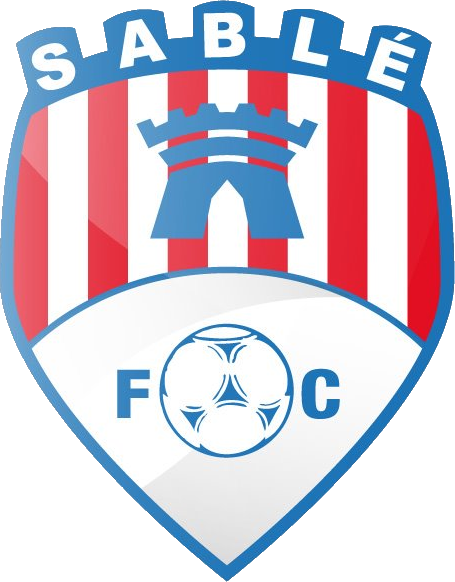
- Full name: Sablé Football Club
- Founded: 1986; 39 years ago
- Ground: Stade Rémy Lambert, Sablé-sur-Sarthe
- Capacity: 4,500
- Chairman: Gérard Gautier
- Manager: vacant
- League: Régional 1
- 2024–25: National 3 Group B, 14th of 14 (Relegated)
- Website: sable-fc.footeo.com

Sablé Football Club is a French football club based in Sablé-sur-Sarthe in the Sarthe department.

The club competes in Régional 1, the sixth level of French football.

== History ==
The Sablé Football Club was founded in 1986 by merger of three clubs: the Sabolienne Star chaired by Gérard Nais; the Association Sportive de Sable chaired by Maurice Pottier (1928–2003); and Sable-Relax.

== Current squad ==
As of 22 February 2018

Note: Flags indicate national team as defined under FIFA eligibility rules; some limited exceptions apply. Players may hold more than one non-FIFA nationality.

No.	Pos.	Nation	Player
—	GK	(France) FRA	Vincent Lorentin
—	GK	(France) FRA	Julien Paterne
—	DF	(France) FRA	Quentin Bachelier
—	DF	(France) FRA	Baptiste Foucault
—	DF	(France) FRA	Allan Laisné
—	DF	(France) FRA	Julien Legendre
—	DF	(France) FRA	David Lemaitre
—	DF	(France) FRA	Damien Michel
—	DF	(France) FRA	Simon Ortiz
—	DF	(France) FRA	Youssoufi Diarra
—	MF	(France) FRA	François Berthé
—	MF	(France) FRA	Clément Buisson
—	MF	(France) FRA	Valentin Gautier

No.	Pos.	Nation	Player
—	MF	(France) FRA	Thomas Gerbault
—	MF	(Ivory Coast) CIV	Jean-Paul Gneba
—	MF	(France) FRA	Florian Robert
—	MF	(France) FRA	Clément Ferrand
—	MF	(France) FRA	Emmanuel Thibault
—	MF	(France) FRA	Anthony Derouard
—	FW	(France) FRA	Quentin Bacha
—	FW	(France) FRA	Antonin Duveau
—	FW	(France) FRA	Geoffrey Hanteville
—	FW	(France) FRA	Baptiste Naïs
—	FW	(France) FRA	Jeffrey Quarshie
—	FW	(France) FRA	Benjamin Riclin
