= Mike Kleiber =

Swiss footballer (born 1993)

Personal information
- Full name: Mike Kleiber
- Date of birth: 4 February 1993 (age 33)
- Place of birth: Switzerland
- Height: 1.78 m (5 ft 10 in)
- Position: Right midfielder

Team information
- Current team: Young Fellows Juventus

Youth career
- FC Oberrieden
- FC Thalwil
- FC Zürich

Senior career*
Years	Team	Apps	(Gls)
2013–2017	FC Zürich	7	(0)
2017–2019	FC Rapperswil-Jona	28	(0)
2019–	Young Fellows Juventus	0	(0)

International career
2008	Switzerland U15	6	(2)
	Switzerland U16	5	(1)
2009–2010	Switzerland U17	13	(1)
2010–2011	Switzerland U18	9	(1)
2011–2012	Switzerland U19	9	(2)
2013	Switzerland U21	1	(0)
- * Club domestic league appearances and goals as of 27 January 2019

Mike Kleiber (born 4 February 1993) is a Swiss footballer who plays for Young Fellows Juventus in the Swiss Challenge League.

== Career ==
=== Young Fellows Juventus ===
On 25 January 2019, Kleiber signed with Young Fellows Juventus.
