= Stade Municipal de Péronnas =

Football stadium in Péronnas, Rhône-Alpes, France

Coordinates: 46.1879°N 5.2134°E

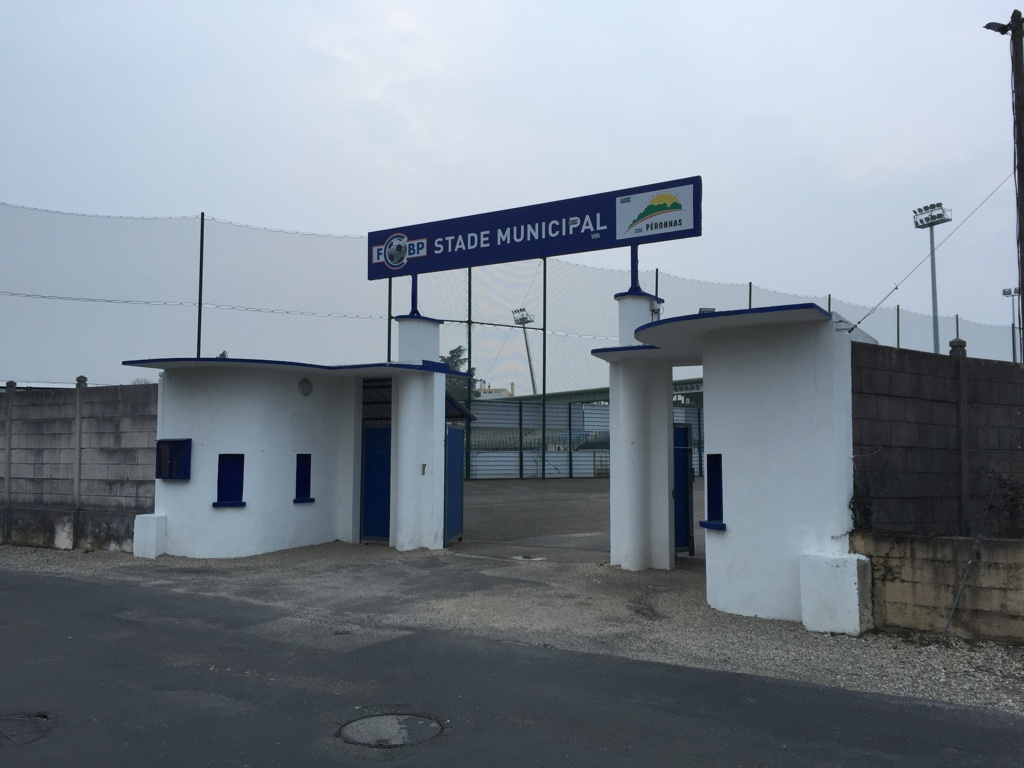
Stade Municipal de Péronnas

The Stade Municipal de Péronnas is a football stadium in Péronnas, Rhône-Alpes, France. It is the current home of FC Bourg-Péronnas. It has a capacity of 3,610.
