= Saint-Hilaire-de-Loulay =

- Part of Montaigu-Vendée
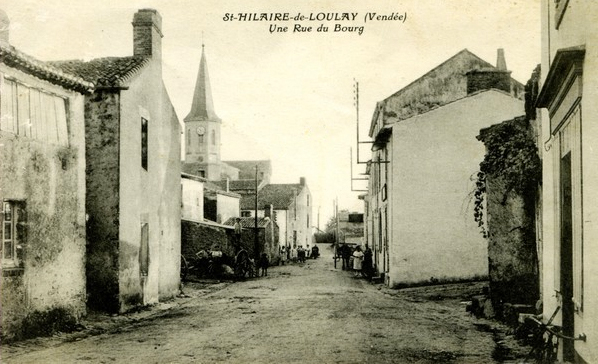
- A road in Saint-Hilaire-de-Loulay, around 1900

- Coat of arms
- Location of Saint-Hilaire-de-Loulay
- Location within France Location within Pays de la Loire
- Coordinates: 47°00′13″N 1°19′47″W
- Country: France
- Region: Pays de la Loire
- Department: Vendée
- Arrondissement: La Roche-sur-Yon
- Canton: Montaigu-Vendée
- Commune: Montaigu-Vendée
- Area^{1}: 40.62 km^{2} (15.68 sq mi)
- Highest elevation: 72 m (236 ft)
- Lowest elevation: 18 m (59 ft)
- Population (2022): 4,798
  - Density: 118.1/km^{2} (305.9/sq mi)
- Time zone: UTC+01:00 (CET)
  - Summer (DST): UTC+02:00 (CEST)
- Postal code: 85600
- ^{1} French Land Register data, which excludes lakes, ponds, glaciers > 1 km^{2} (0.386 sq mi or 247 acres) and river estuaries.

Saint-Hilaire-de-Loulay (French pronunciation: [sɛ̃.t‿ilɛʁ də lulɛ]) is a former commune in the Vendée department in the Pays de la Loire region in western France. On 1 January 2019, it was merged into the new commune Montaigu-Vendée.

== Monuments ==
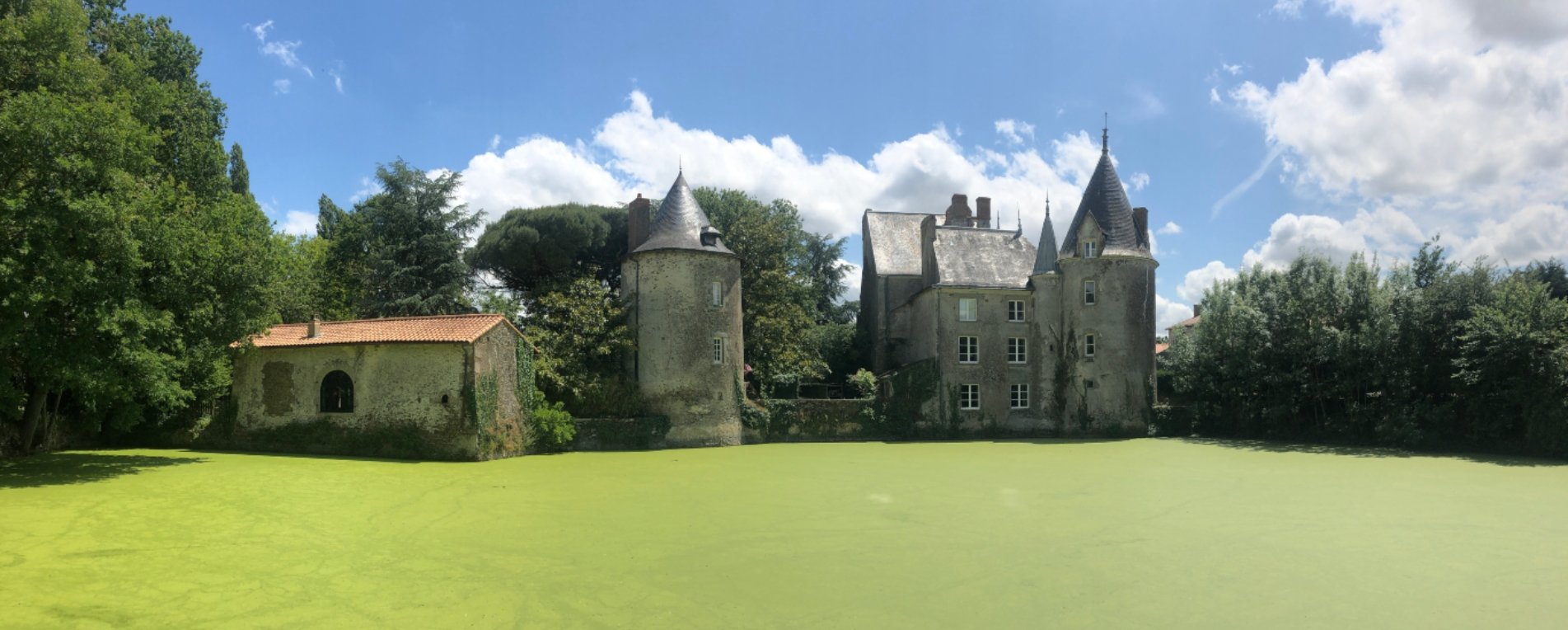
Château de la Preuille

The Château de la Preuille, one of the oldest castles in the Loire region, is located here.

== Restaurant naming ==
Saint-Hilaire-de-Loulay is the home town of Thierry Rautureau. His restaurant "Loulay" is named to reflect his home town.

== See also ==
- Communes of the Vendée department
