= Jérémy Obin =

French footballer (born 1993)

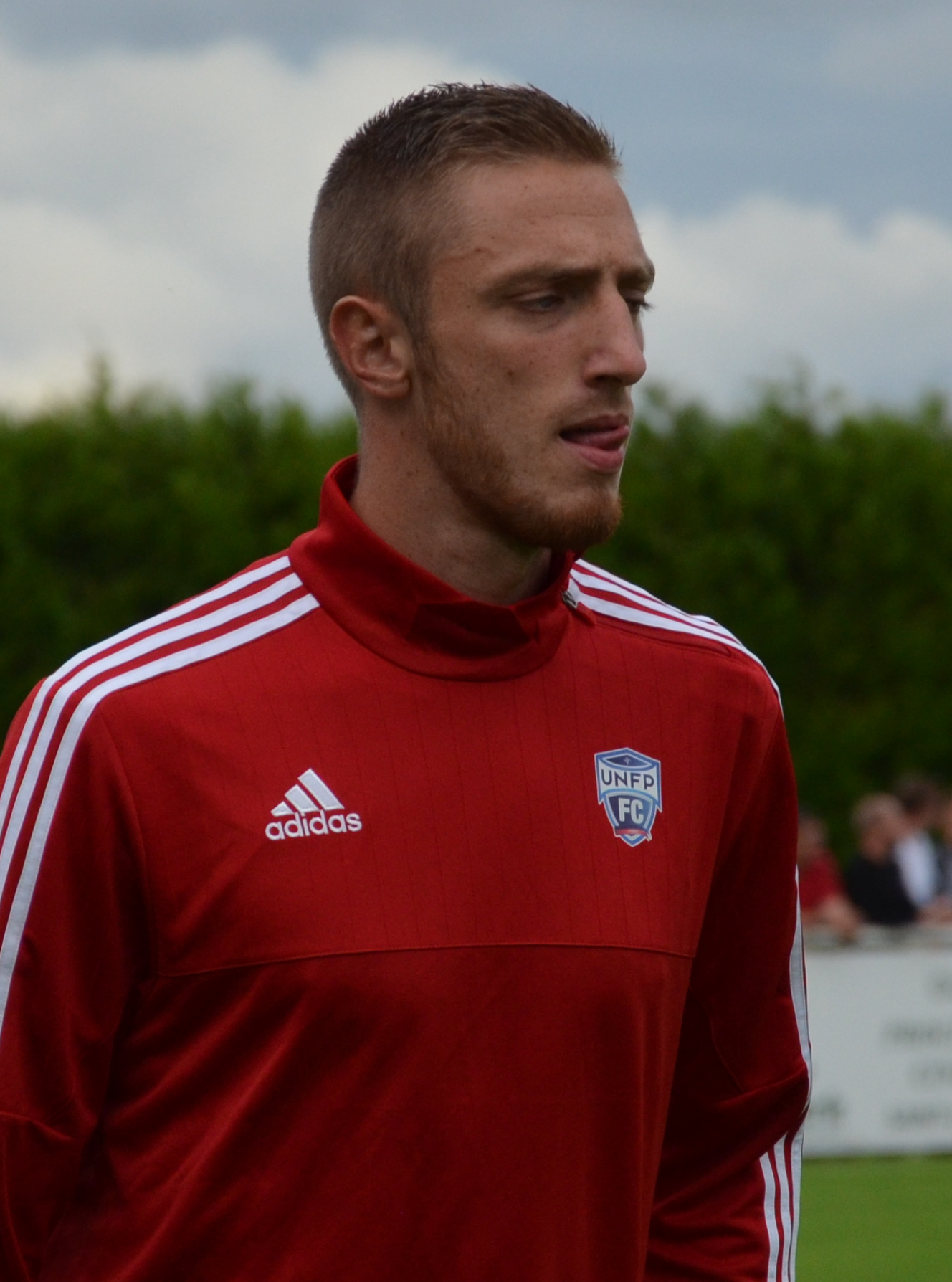
- Obin in 2016

Personal information
- Full name: Jérémy Obin
- Date of birth: 5 March 1993 (age 33)
- Place of birth: Lille, France
- Height: 1.88 m (6 ft 2 in)
- Position: Defender

Team information
- Current team: Sint-Eloois-Winkel

Youth career
- 1999–2001: Lommois
- 2001–2004: Iris Club de Lambersart
- 2004–2011: Lille

Senior career*
Years	Team	Apps	(Gls)
2011–2013	Valenciennes	0	(0)
2011–2013	Valenciennes B	13	(0)
2013–2015	RWS Bruxelles	30	(2)
2015–2016	Maasmechelen	22	(0)
2016–2017	RFC Seraing	11	(1)
2017–	Sint-Eloois-Winkel	21	(1)

International career^{‡}
2008–2009	France U16	9	(0)
2009–2010	France U17	12	(0)
2010–2011	France U18	11	(1)
- * Club domestic league appearances and goals as of 26 July 2015 ‡ National team caps and goals as of 1 July 2018

Jérémy Obin (born 5 March 1993) is a French footballer who plays for and captains Belgian club Sint-Eloois-Winkel. He plays as either a centre-back or left-back.

== Career ==
Born in Lille, Obin began his career playing for hometown club Lille. After failing to establish himself as a professional at Lille, in June 2011, Obin signed a two-year trainee contract with Derby du Nord rivals Valenciennes. He made his professional debut on 31 August 2011 in a 3–2 Coupe de la Ligue defeat away to Dijon appearing as an injury time substitute. Obin is a France youth international having represented his nation at all levels for which he has been eligible. He served as captain at under-17 and under-18 level and represent the former team at the 2010 UEFA European Under-17 Football Championship.
