= Anthony Derouard =

French footballer (born 1992)

Personal information
- Full name: Anthony Derouard
- Date of birth: 14 May 1992 (age 34)
- Place of birth: Sablé, France
- Height: 1.82 m (6 ft 0 in)
- Position: Forward

Team information
- Current team: Sablé FC

Youth career
- 1998–2006: Sablé-sur-Sarthe
- 2006–2011: Le Mans

Senior career*
| Years | Team | Apps | (Gls) |
| 2010–2013 | Le Mans | 23 | (2) |
| 2013–2014 | Luzenac | 14 | (2) |
| 2015 | Châteauroux B | 9 | (1) |
| 2015–2016 | CA Bastia | 27 | (6) |
| 2016–2017 | Sablé FC | 14 | (5) |
| 2017–2018 | Bastia | 17 | (1) |
| 2018– | Sablé FC | 30 | (9) |

International career
| 2009–2010 | France U18 | 8 | (1) |
| 2010–2011 | France U19 | 12 | (5) |
| 2012 | France U20 | 1 | (0) |
- * Club domestic league appearances and goals as of 14:33, 28 December 2019 (UTC)

Anthony Derouard (born 14 May 1992) is a French footballer who plays as a forward for Sablé FC.

He is a France youth international having earned caps at under-18 and under-19 level.

== Career ==
Born in Sablé, Derouard made his professional debut with Le Mans on 21 December 2010 in a league match against Vannes in which he appeared as a substitute in a 1–0 defeat.

In October 2013, he joined US Luzenac. In September 2015, he joined CA Bastia.

In August 2017, Derouard was one of four new signings announced by SC Bastia, which had played in Ligue 1 in the 2016–17 season, but dropped to the fifth-tier Championnat National 3 after filing bankruptcy. He joined from league rivals Sablé FC.
