= Zakarie Labidi =

French footballer (born 1995)

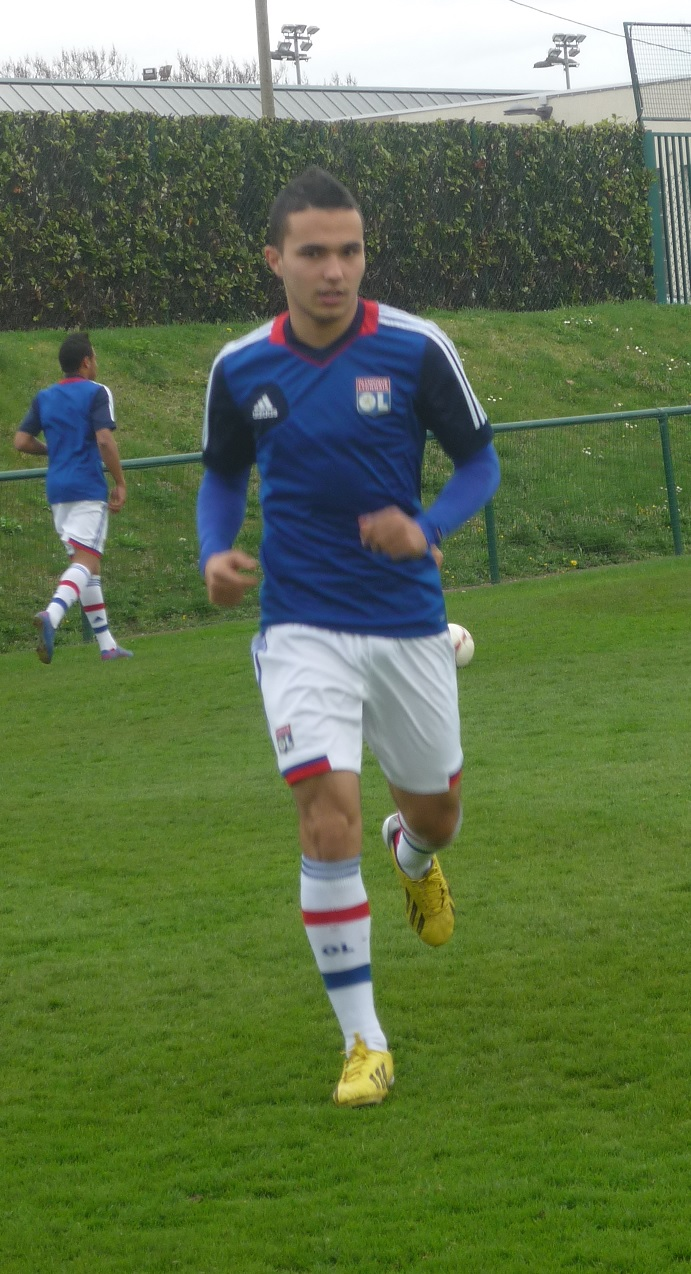
- Zakarie Labidi in 2013.

Personal information
- Full name: Zakarie Labidi
- Date of birth: 8 February 1995 (age 31)
- Place of birth: Villeneuve-la-Garenne, France
- Height: 1.78 m (5 ft 10 in)
- Positions: Attacking midfielder; winger

Team information
- Current team: AS Beauvais

Youth career
- 2003–2005: CSM Île-Saint-Denis
- 2005–2006: Red Star
- 2008–2010: INF Clairefontaine
- 2008–2010: AC Boulogne-Billancourt
- 2010–2015: Lyon

Senior career*
Years	Team	Apps	(Gls)
2012–2016	Lyon B	72	(23)
2016	Lyon	3	(0)
2016–2018	Brest	24	(1)
2016–2018	Brest B	17	(7)
2018–2019	Club Africain	10	(0)
2020–2021	Stade Nyonnais	7	(0)
2021–	AS Beauvais	13	(2)

International career
2010–2011	France U16	16	(5)
2011–2012	France U17	12	(2)
2012–2013	France U18	6	(3)
2013	France U19	3	(0)
- * Club domestic league appearances and goals as of 14:05, 29 May 2022 (UTC)

Zakarie Labidi (born 8 February 1995) is a French footballer who plays for AS Beauvais Oise.

== Club career ==
Labidi is a youth exponent from Lyon. He made his Ligue 1 debut on 21 February 2016 against Lille replacing Jordan Ferri after 84 minutes in a 1–0 away loss.

On 27 July 2016, Labidi signed a one-year contract with Brest.

== International career ==
Labidi was born in France, and is of Tunisian and Algerian descent. He is a youth international for France.

== Career statistics ==
As of match played 1 July 2018

Appearances and goals by club, season and competition
Club	Season	League			Coupe de France		Coupe de la Ligue		Europe		Other		Total	
Club	Season	Division	Apps	Goals	Apps	Goals	Apps	Goals	Apps	Goals	Apps	Goals	Apps	Goals
Lyon II	2012–13	CFA	18	4	—		—		—		0	0	18	4
Lyon II	2013–14	CFA	23	8	—		—		—		—		23	8
Lyon II	2014–15	CFA	13	3	—		—		—		—		13	3
Lyon II	2015–16	CFA	19	8	—		—		—		—		19	8
Lyon II	Total		73	23	—		—		—		0	0	73	23
Lyon	2015–16	Ligue 1	3	0	0	0	0	0	0	0	0	0	3	0
Brest II	2016–17	CFA 2	2	0	—		—		—		0	0	2	0
Brest II	2017–18	National 3	5	2	—		—		—		0	0	5	2
Brest II	Total		7	2	—		—		—		0	0	7	2
Brest	2016–17	Ligue 2	19	1	1	1	2	0	—		—		22	2
Brest	2017–18	Ligue 2	5	0	0	0	1	0	—		—		6	0
Brest	Total		24	1	1	1	3	0	0	0	0	0	28	2
Career total			107	26	1	1	3	0	0	0	0	0	111	27
