= Montaigu, Vendée =

Montaigu
- Part of Montaigu-Vendée
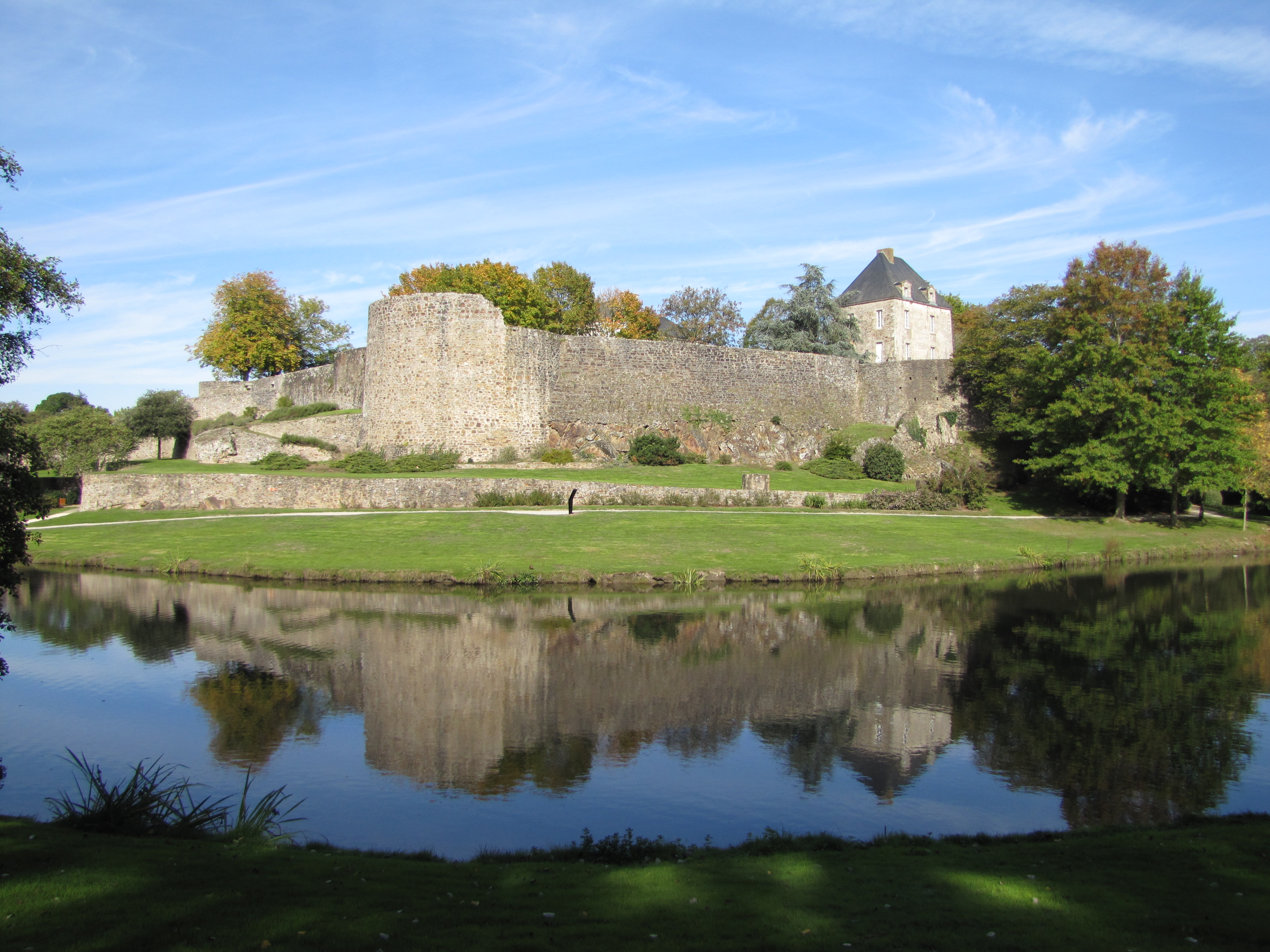
- The Château de Montaigu

- Coat of arms
- Location of Montaigu
- Location within France Location within Pays de la Loire
- Coordinates: 46°58′25″N 1°18′31″W
- Country: France
- Region: Pays de la Loire
- Department: Vendée
- Arrondissement: La Roche-sur-Yon
- Canton: Montaigu-Vendée
- Commune: Montaigu-Vendée
- Area^{1}: 3.03 km^{2} (1.17 sq mi)
- Elevation: 48 m (157 ft)
- Highest elevation: 57 m (187 ft)
- Lowest elevation: 23 m (75 ft)
- Population (2022): 5,359
  - Density: 1,770/km^{2} (4,580/sq mi)
- Time zone: UTC+01:00 (CET)
  - Summer (DST): UTC+02:00 (CEST)
- Postal code: 85600
- ^{1} French Land Register data, which excludes lakes, ponds, glaciers > 1 km^{2} (0.386 sq mi or 247 acres) and river estuaries.

Montaigu (French pronunciation: [mɔ̃tɛgy]) is a former commune in the Vendée department in the Pays de la Loire region in western France. On 1 January 2019, it was merged into the new commune Montaigu-Vendée.

== See also ==
- Communes of the Vendée department
