= Alain-François Le Borgne de Keruzoret =

French naval officer

- Born: 1706; Brittany
- Died: May 12, 1771 (aged 64–65); Brest
- Military career
- Allegiance: France
- Branch: Navy
- Rank: Chef d'escadre

Alain-François Le Borgne, seigneur de Kerusoret or Keruzoret (c. 1706, Province of Brittany - 12 May 1771, Brest) was a French naval officer from a Breton noble family. His final rank was chef d'escadre.

== Sources ==
- Bulletin de la Société Académique de Brest, 1890, p. 237
