= 2017–18 Coupe de France preliminary rounds, Pays de la Loire =

The 2017–18 Coupe de France preliminary rounds, Pays de la Loire make up the qualifying football competition to decide which teams from the French Pays de la Loire region take part in the main competition from the seventh round.

== First round ==
The matches in Pays de la Loire were played on 26 and 27 August 2017.

First round results: Pays de la Loire

Tie no	Home team (tier)	Score	Away team (tier)
1.	FC Chaudron-St Quentin (12)	3–4	US Les Epesses-St Mars (11)
2.	AS Lamnay (13)	0–9	Internationale du Mans (12)
3.	Stade Couëronnais FC (11)	0–2	St Michel SF (12)
4.	FS Champgenéteux (13)	1–15	Voltigeurs St Georges-Buttavent (11)
5.	US St Clément-de-la-Place (13)	2–1	Bierné-Gennes FC (11)
6.	ES Beaulieu-sur-Oudon (12)	1–5	US Cigné (10)
7.	AEPR Rezé (9)	3–0 (a.e.t.)	FC Chavagnes-La Rabatelière (10)
8.	St Médard St Mars-de-Coutais (13)	1–3	FC Noirmoutier (11)
9.	AG Laigné (10)	1–6	AS Avrillé (9)
10.	UC Auvers-Poillé (9)	0–2	AS Tiercé-Cheffes (8)
11.	AS Dom-Tom (12)	0–4	Sud Vendée Football (9)
12.	St Pierre Mazières (10)	1–5	NDC Angers (8)
13.	ES Marais (10)	5–1	EV Le Fenouiller (11)
14.	CA Loué (10)	5–2	US Aronnaise (8)
15.	US Yvré-le-Pôlin (11)	3–4 (a.e.t.)	US Chantenay-Villedieu (10)
16.	ES Vertou (11)	1–1 (4–5 p)	FC Laurentais Landemontais (9)
17.	ES Dresny-Plessé (11)	2–4 (a.e.t.)	La Saint André (9)
18.	AS Chazé-Vern (11)	1–0	FC Château-Gontier (9)
19.	CS St Pierre-des-Landes (10)	0–3	US Roézé (8)
20.	St Pierre SF La Guyonnière (13)	1–4	JF Boissière-des-Landes (11)
21.	SA St Florent-des-Bois (11)	2–0	ES Château-d'Olonne (12)
22.	EA La Tessoualle (9)	1–2	AS Bayard-Saumur (8)
23.	ES Tourlandry-Vezins-Chanteloup (12)	1–6	FF Mortagne-sur-Sèvre (11)
24.	AFC Bouin-Bois-de-Céné-Châteauneuf (12)	0–5	ES Haute Goulaine (12)
25.	US Varades (10)	7–3	ES Layon (10)
26.	USM Beauvoir-sur-Mer (11)	1–9	FC Immaculée (10)
27.	ES Craon (8)	0–3 (Note: ES Craon penalised for fielding an ineligible player. USA Pouancé qualify. Original scoreline 2–0.)	USA Pouancé (8)
28.	FC Val de Moine (11)	0–2	FC Mouchamps-Rochetrejoux (9)
29.	US Oizé (12)	2–1	AS La Milesse (11)
30.	FC Nieul-Maillezais-Les Autises (12)	0–5	FC Cantonal Sud Vendée (12)
31.	FC Logne et Boulogne (12)	1–5	FC Bouaine Rocheservière (10)
32.	US Bernardière-Cugand (10)	1–2 (a.e.t.)	FC Entente du Vignoble (11)
33.	Union St Leger-St Germain-Champtocé (11)	0–0 (5–4 p)	US Thouaré (9)
34.	Océane FC (12)	4–2	US St Étienne-Palluau-La Chapelle Palluau (10)
35.	US Forcé (9)	2–2 (8–9 p)	Ernéenne Foot (7)
36.	Commequiers SF (12)	1–2	Métallo Sport Chantenaysien (9)
37.	US Gétigné (11)	3–5	RS Ardelay (9)
38.	ES Val Baugeois (12)	0–3	US Crosmièroise (10)
39.	St Georges FC (10)	4–2	Pomjeannais JA (10)
40.	Châtelais FC (11)	0–4	FC Ruillé-Loiron (10)
41.	ASC St Barthélémy-d'Anjou (12)	2–3	AS St Sylvain-d'Anjou (11)
42.	US Mesnard-Vendrennes (12)	0–4	AS Le-Puy-St Bonnet (11)
43.	ES Champfleur (12)	1–5	FC La Bazoge (10)
44.	Temple Cordemais FC (12)	0–7	St Herblain OC (10)
45.	AS Moutiers-St Avaugourd (12)	2–3 (a.e.t.)	ES Longevillaise (11)
46.	UFC Erdre et Donneau (12)	1–4	Val de Sèvre Football (10)
47.	FC La Garnache (12)	3–1	AS Landevieille (10)
48.	AS St Jean-d'Assé (10)	1–0	US Laval (9)
49.	Petit-Mars FC (12)	1–2	Etoile du Bocage (12)
50.	Les Côteaux de la Roche (12)	2–5	US Bazoges Beaurepaire (11)
51.	SC Avessac-Fégréac (11)	2–0	Amicale Dolaysienne (12)
52.	Herbadilla Foot (12)	2–0	AS St Gervais (12)
53.	Don Bosco Football Nantes (12)	3–4	FC Castel-Fiacrais (10)
54.	ES Maritime (9)	1–3 (a.e.t.)	FC Chapelle-des-Marais (7)
55.	AS Étival (11)	4–2 (a.e.t.)	Ste Jamme Sportive (11)
56.	Doutre SC (10)	0–1	US Bazouges-Cré (8)
57.	US Ste Reine-de-Bretagne (11)	1–4	La Malouine Football (9)
58.	US Méral-Cossé (8)	1–0	AL Châteaubriant (7)
59.	AS Guillaumois (12)	2–6	AS La Madeleine (10)
60.	FC Sud Sèvre et Maine (10)	3–3 (1–3 p)	Écureils des Pays de Monts (9)
61.	AS Chédouet (11)	2–4 (a.e.t.)	Gorron FC (9)
62.	SC Nord Atlantique (10)	1–0	ES Gavraise (11)
63.	FC St Philbert-Réorthe-Jaudonnière (12)	0–1	Entente Sud Vendée (10)
64.	ES Belligné-Chapelle-Maumusson (8)	2–3	AS St Pierre-Montrevault (7)
65.	Donges FC (11)	1–5	ES Pornichet (9)
66.	US Bouguenais (13)	2–2 (5–3 p)	FC Toutes Aides Nantes (12)
67.	CS Javron-Neuilly (11)	3–0	AS St Paterne (12)
68.	Gaubretière-St Martin FC (11)	1–3	AS Sud Loire (9)
69.	Savenay-Malville FC (10)	0–6	AC St Brevin (9)
70.	AS Salle-Aubry-Poitevinière (12)	0–2	FC St Laurent Malvent (10)
71.	US Bugallière Orvault (13)	1–4	St Joseph de Porterie Nantes (11)
72.	US Bequots-Lucquois (9)	1–2	ASAG La Haye-Fouassière (8)
73.	ES Montfort-le-Gesnois (11)	1–2	AS St Pavace (9)
74.	Pays de Chantonnay Foot (9)	1–3 (a.e.t.)	FC Robretières La Roche-sur-Yon (8)
75.	AS Longeron-Torfou (10)	3–2	FC Cécilien Martinoyen (9)
76.	AS Bruffière Defontaine (11)	9–1	AF Trémentines (11)
77.	US Michelaise et Triolaise (12)	0–7	Hermitage Venansault (11)
78.	FC Loulaysien (12)	1–5	ES Vallet (11)
79.	AS Loigné-sur-Mayenne (10)	0–3	ÉS Trélazé (9)
80.	St Vincent LUSTVI (11)	2–0	AS Marsacais (12)
81.	Nozay OS (10)	1–7	JA St Mars-du-Désert (9)
82.	AS St Maixent-sur-Vie (11)	2–5	FC Retz (10)
83.	ES Notre-Dame-des-Landes (11)	1–5	US Lucéene (9)
84.	FC Givrand l'Aiguillon (12)	3–1	Arche FC (12)
85.	Legé FC (11)	3–2	FC Saligny (9)
86.	Étoile du Don Moisdon-Meilleraye (11)	0–4	Nort ACF (9)
87.	US Villaines-Malicorne (11)	1–2	JS Parigné-l'Évêque (9)
88.	St Sebastien Boussay (13)	0–1	FC Meilleraie-Montournais-Menomblet (12)
89.	FC Brennois Boiséen (9)	4–2 (a.e.t.)	AS Bouffére (8)
90.	Réveil St Géréon (9)	1–4	Intrépide Angers Foot (8)
91.	US La Chapelle-d'Aligné (12)	1–1 (7–6 p)	JG Coudray (10)
92.	RC Doué-la-Fontaine (9)	7–1	FC Beaupréau (8)
93.	US Briolletaine (11)	0–1	JS Solesmienne (10)
94.	FC St Lambert-St Jean-St Léger-St Martin (11)	5–0	ES Gennes-Les Rosiers (12)
95.	FC Jard-Avrillé (10)	0–1	US Aubigny (9)
96.	FC Val du Loir (11)	0–1	US Combrée-Bel-Air-Noyant (11)
97.	St André-St Macaire FC (9)	2–4	FC Mouilleron-Thouarsais-Caillère (8)
98.	FC Bécon-St Augustin (9)	1–2	ES Bouchemaine (8)
99.	US Précigné (11)	0–11	FC Pellouailles-Corze (10)
100.	St Cyr Foot Herbignac (11)	1–1 (6–7 p)	Pornic Foot (9)
101.	FCPB L'Hermenault (9)	3–4	ES Côte de Lumière (8)
102.	FC Fief Gesté (11)	3–0	FC Grand Lieu (10)
103.	JS Louailles (12)	3–4	Aiglons Durtalois (10)
104.	Coëx Olympique (9)	0–0 (4–3 p)	Luçon FC (8)
105.	US St Pierre-la-Cour (10)	2–3	FC Pays de Sillé (9)
106.	RS Teiphalien Tiffauges (13)	0–6	ES La Romagne-Roussay (11)
107.	AS Maine (11)	0–2	LSG Les Brouzils (9)
108.	Nantes St Pierre (9)	7–1	AS Landais (9)
109.	FC Falleron-Froidfond (11)	4–2	Étoile Mouzillon Foot (11)
110.	ES Le Puy-Vaudelnay (12)	1–2	ES Montilliers (11)
111.	US Dyonisienne (10)	2–4	US Marans (11)
112.	JGE Sucé-sur-Erdre (9)	0–1	AS Sautronnaise (7)
113.	Foot Espoir 85 (11)	3–2	ES Pineaux (11)
114.	AS Vaas (12)	2–6	ASR Vernantes-Vernoil (11)
115.	FC Mesnilaurentais (11)	0–5	ES Aubance (9)
116.	AS Sargéenne (11)	2–2 (5–3 p)	JA Soulgé-sur-Ouette (9)
117.	LS Ste Flaive des Loups (12)	1–3	ES Grosbreuil (10)
118.	JF Cholet (10)	0–0 (2–4 p)	US Beaufort-en-Vallée (8)
119.	FC La Génétouze (9)	0–2	Stade Olonnais (9)
120.	FC Côte Sauvage (10)	2–1 (a.e.t.)	Espérance Campbon (11)
121.	ES du Lac (11)	4–1	EM Sallertaine (12)
122.	US Vibraysienne (9)	3–5 (a.e.t.)	US Nautique Spay (7)
123.	Vigilante St Fulgent (9)	2–3	US Loire et Divatte (8)
124.	US Pellerinaise (12)	0–9	FC Chabossière (10)
125.	Réveil St Aubinois (11)	2–3	FC Généraudière Roche Sud (11)
126.	US St Georges-sur-Loire (11)	6–1	FC Villedieu-La Renaudière (12)
127.	St Joachim Brière Sports (11)	2–3	ES Vigneux (9)
128.	FC Ambrières (10)	2–1	ASO Montenay (9)
129.	ASR Machecoul (9)	2–1	Marsouins Brétigonllais Foot (8)
130.	AS Clermont-Créans (12)	1–0 (a.e.t.)	USC Corné (11)
131.	SSJA St Mathurin (13)	0–5	RS Les Clouzeaux (11)
132.	AS Meslay-du-Maine (8)	4–4 (12–11 p)	ASI Mûrs-Erigné (7)
133.	Le Cellier Mauves FC (12)	0–5	Olympique Ste Gemmes-sur-Loire (11)
134.	ES Cherré (11)	0–4	ES Yvré-l'Évêque (10)
135.	ES La Pouëze (10)	1–2 (a.e.t.)	AS St Pierre Angrie (11)
136.	JS Ludoise (10)	1–2	CS Changé (8)
137.	AS Brivet (11)	1–0	Espérance Crossac (11)
138.	Les Farfadets St Paul-en-Pareds (12)	0–4	Christophe-Séguinière (10)
139.	AS Écouflant (13)	0–4	AS Mésanger (12)
140.	US Argentré (10)	3–2	ASL L'Huisserie Foot (8)
141.	ES Belleville-sur-Vie (11)	3–1	St Pierre Sportif Nieul-le-Dolent (10)
142.	AS Ballée (11)	0–3	CS Sablons-Gazonfier (9)
143.	US Maze (11)	2–4	SC Angevin (9)
144.	ES St Denis-la-Chevasse (10)	0–3	Élan de Gorges Foot (8)
145.	La Vigilante Mayet (10)	2–2 (4–5 p)	La Patriote Bonnétable (8)
146.	Ste Foy FC (11)	1–2	US Chauché (10)
147.	FC Bouaye (9)	1–3	St Pierre de Retz (8)
148.	AS Oisseau (11)	1–3	Alerte Ahuillé FC (9)
149.	ASPTT-CAEB Cholet (9)	0–2	Flochamont-sur-Sèvre Football (9)
150.	FC Presqu'île Vilaine (11)	3–1	Espoir du Sillon (12)
151.	AS Seiches-sur-le-Loire-Marcé (9)	4–2	SS Noyen-sur-Sarthe (8)
152.	St Melaine OS (11)	1–3	Club du Haut Layon (11)
153.	La France d'Aizenay (8)	1–2	AC Basse-Goulaine (7)
154.	ASPTT Le Mans (10)	0–3	CA Evronnais (8)
155.	US Bouloire (10)	5–3	Beaumont SA (8)
156.	FC Trois Rivières (12)	1–4	St Marc Football (11)
157.	EF Cheffois-St Maurice (9)	4–2	FC Portguais Cholet (10)
158.	AS Le Bourgneuf-la-Forêt (10)	1–0 (a.e.t.)	Hermine St Ouennaise (8)
159.	AS Brée (11)	0–1	US Entrammes (9)
160.	US Autize Vendée (12)	2–1	US Herminoise (10)
161.	FC Ingrandes-Le Fresne (12)	0–3	FC Longuenée-en-Anjou (10)
162.	OS Dollon (10)	5–4	US Glonnières (8)
163.	US La Chapelle-St-Rémy (10)	0–5	EG Rouillon (8)
164.	AS Sion Lusanger (12)	1–4	US Soudan (11)
165.	FC Fuilet-Chaussaire (10)	0–1	Football Chalonnes-Chaudefonds (9)
166.	EA Baugeois (11)	1–2	US Cantenay-Épinard (9)
167.	Héric FC (12)	1–0	Jeunes d'Erbray (10)
168.	US Conlie (10)	7–2	ES Quelainaise (9)
169.	Andrezé-Jub-Jallais FC (10)	4–3	ES St Georges-des-Gardes (9)
170.	Orvault RC (10)	1–4	Mareuil SC (8)
171.	FC Landivy-Pontmain (11)	0–1	US Chantrigné (11)
172.	Hirondelle Football (9)	3–2 (a.e.t.)	AS Vieillevigne-La Planche (8)
173.	SomloirYzernay CPF (9)	4–1	AS Ponts-de-Cé (10)
174.	BoupèreMonProuant FC (12)	5–0	USE Dompierroise (10)
175.	FC Mouzeil-Teillé-Ligné (9)	3–3 (4–5 p)	Nantes La Mellinet (8)
176.	USC Pays de Montsurs (10)	1–4	AS La Chapelle-St-Aubin (8)
177.	FC Auzay-Chaix (12)	2–1	FC Talmondais (10)
178.	US Tennie-St Symphorien (11)	1–4	CA Voutréen (11)
179.	SO Candé-Freigné (11)	3–1 (a.e.t.)	Olympique Liré-Drain (9)
180.	FC Achards (8)	0–3	Elan Sorinières Football (8)
181.	US Pré-en-Pail (11)	2–5	AS Contest-St Baudelle (10)
182.	St Gilles-St Hilaire FC (12)	0–1	US Landeronde-St Georges (11)
183.	FC Fay Bouvron (11)	0–3	AOS Pontchâteau (11)
184.	AS Vaiges (11)	0–3	JS Allonnes (9)
185.	ARC Tillières (12)	1–1 (5–6 p)	Landreau-Loroux OSC (11)
186.	La Panafricaine FC (13)	0–3	FC Stephanois (12)
187.	FC Villevêque-Soucelles (11)	2–1	AS Val-d'Erdre-Auxence (11)
188.	US Ferrièroise (11)	3–2	FC St Julien-Vairé (10)
189.	US Fougerolles (10)	2–1	FC Lassay (9)
190.	US Pays de Juhel (10)	1–5	AS Andouillé (8)
191.	US St Aubin-des-Châteaux (12)	3–3 (1–4 p)	Abbaretz-Saffré FC (11)
192.	JS Brion (12)	4–1	ES Varennes-Villebernier (11)
193.	US Le Luart (11)	1–3	CO Laigné-St Gervais (10)
194.	FC Layon (11)	2–3	ES Andard-Brain (9)
195.	Sympho Foot Treillières (10)	1–0	CS Montoirin (9)
196.	US Oie (11)	4–3	SC Apremont (13)
197.	ES La Copechagnière (11)	3–4	US Bournezeau-St Hilaire (10)
198.	AS Neuville-sur-Sarthe (11)	1–0	AS Ruaudin (9)
199.	CAS Possosavennières (10)	4–0	Olympique Chemillé-Melay (8)
200.	FC Guémené-Massérac (13)	1–0	Les Touches FC (12)
201.	US Chapeloise (13)	1–6	US Suplice André Mormaison (12)
202.	Espérance St Yves Nantes (12)	4–2 (a.e.t.)	FC Oudon-Couffé (11)
203.	Brecé Sports (11)	1–4	US Le Genest (9)
204.	Lombron Sports (12)	2–3	CO Cormes (11)
205.	US Toutlemonde Maulévrier (10)	2–3	AS St Hilaire-Vihiers-St Paul (9)
206.	CA Vouvantais/US Glainoise (11)	1–0	CO St Mars-la-Jaille (11)
207.	CS Lion d'Angers (12)	2–1	AS Juigné-sur-Sarthe (11)
208.	SS Bailleul (13)	1–6	FC Nyoiseau/Bouillé-Ménard/Grugé-l'Hôpital (12)
209.	UF Allones-Brain-sur-Allones (12)	2–2 (3–4 p)	Croix Blanche Angers (9)
210.	Française Pontvallain (11)	2–1	AS Thorigné-sur-Dué (11)
211.	AS La Salle-Coron (11)	3–4	Energie Le May-sur-Èvre (9)
212.	ASVR Ambillou-Château (12)	1–4	AC Longué (10)
213.	FC Ménil (12)	1–3	SC Ste Gemmes-d'Andigné (11)
214.	FC La Montagne (9)	1–4	ES Blain (8)
215.	Anjou Baconne FC (12)	3–0	US Villiers-Charlemagne (11)
216.	CS Cheminots du Mans (11)	1–4	US Mansigné (9)
217.	Eclair de Chauvé (13)	1–1 (4–3 p)	US Vital Frossay (11)
218.	JS du Layon (12)	1–1 (6–5 p)	Entente St Lambert des Levées (12)
219.	US La Bigottière-Alexain (11)	1–3	Larchamp LMFC (11)
220.	ASD Noyantais (12)	5–3	AC Belle-Bielle (12)
221.	SC Tuffé (11)	0–6	CO Castélorien (8)
222.	FC St Georges-Pruillé (11)	0–3	US St Mars-la-Brière (8)
223.	Nantes Sud 98 (12)	1–2	St Martin Treize Septiers (12)
224.	AS La Baconnière (11)	2–0	US St Germain-le-Fouilloux (11)
225.	ACS Dervallières (12)	9–3	FC Bourgneuf-en-Retz (12)
226.	USJA St Martin-Aviré-Louvaine (12)	5–0	FC Montjean (11)
227.	ASPTT Laval (10)	4–2	AS Martigné-sur-Mayenne (11)
228.	AS Grandchamp Foot (12)	2–0	AL Couëts Bouguenais (12)
229.	Fillé Sport (12)	3–0	US Savigné-l'Évêque (11)
230.	US Breilloise (12)	1–1 (2–4 p)	US St Ouen-St Biez (12)
231.	AS Brette-les-Pins (12)	0–6	GSI Saosnois Courgains (12)
232.	AS Valanjou (12)	3–1 (a.e.t.)	FC Castelvarennais (12)
233.	FC Louet-Juignéen (12)	3–3 (4–3 p)	Bé-Léger FC (11)
234.	Etoile de Clisson (8)	2–2 (0–4 p)	ASC St Médard-de-Doulon Nantes (9)
235.	FC Bout' Loire-et-Evre (12)	1–0	AS Lac de Maine (10)

== Second round ==
These matches were played on 2 and 3 September 2017.

Second round results: Pays de la Loire

Tie no	Home team (tier)	Score	Away team (tier)
1.	ASC St Médard-de-Doulon Nantes (9)	3–2 (a.e.t.)	FC Montaigu 85 (7)
2.	Coëx Olympique (9)	0–4	UF St Herblain (7)
3.	FC Guémené-Massérac (13)	3–0	AS St Pierre Angrie (11)
4.	Landreau-Loroux OSC (11)	6–2	St Martin Treize Septiers (12)
5.	Aiglons Durtalois (10)	1–2 (a.e.t.)	Française Pontvallain (11)
6.	US Chantenay-Villedieu (10)	7–1	US Argentré (10)
7.	ES Aubance (9)	2–0	CO Castélorien (8)
8.	ES Montilliers (11)	1–2	Val de Sèvre Football (10)
9.	AS Le Bourgneuf-la-Forêt (10)	3–5	US Guécélard (7)
10.	FC Noirmoutier (11)	0–6	AC St Brevin (9)
11.	AS Andouillé (8)	2–4	AS Le Mans Villaret (7)
12.	US Mansigné (9)	1–1 (3–5 p)	US Beaufort-en-Vallée (8)
13.	FC La Bazoge (10)	1–6	CA Evronnais (8)
14.	US Suplice André Mormaison (12)	0–1	ES Côte de Lumière (8)
15.	EF Cheffois-St Maurice (9)	0–1	AS St Pierre-Montrevault (7)
16.	FC Cantonal Sud Vendée (12)	5–0	US Bournezeau-St Hilaire (10)
17.	ES Longevillaise (11)	1–2	Sud Vendée Football (9)
18.	FC Meilleraie-Montournais-Menomblet (12)	1–2	Christophe-Séguinière (10)
19.	US Marans (11)	4–2 (a.e.t.)	US Oizé (12)
20.	AS La Baconnière (11)	2–3 (a.e.t.)	CA Loué (10)
21.	FC Bouaine Rocheservière (10)	4–0	Legé FC (11)
22.	SomloirYzernay CPF (9)	0–2	FC Essartais (7)
23.	AS St Jean-d'Assé (10)	1–1 (4–3 p)	Écommoy FC (7)
24.	La Saint André (9)	0–3	US La Baule-Le Pouliguen (7)
25.	RS Ardelay (9)	1–1 (4–3 p)	Andrezé-Jub-Jallais FC (10)
26.	FF Mortagne-sur-Sèvre (11)	2–1 (a.e.t.)	AS Le-Puy-St Bonnet (11)
27.	GSI Saosnois Courgains (12)	0–4	US Conlie (10)
28.	US Crosmièroise (10)	3–0	US Arnage Pontlieue (7)
29.	AS Tiercé-Cheffes (8)	7–0	AS Meslay-du-Maine (8)
30.	Elan Sorinières Football (8)	0–1	AEPR Rezé (9)
31.	Croix Blanche Angers (9)	1–1 (3–2 p)	RC Ancenis 44 (7)
32.	FC Généraudière Roche Sud (11)	0–4	Stade Olonnais (9)
33.	US Entrammes (9)	3–3 (4–5 p)	AS Seiches-sur-le-Loire-Marcé (9)
34.	ES Haute Goulaine (12)	0–0 (5–6 p)	LSG Les Brouzils (9)
35.	ES Yvré-l'Évêque (10)	2–4 (a.e.t.)	Ernéenne Foot (7)
36.	FC Pays de Sillé (9)	1–0	US St Berthevin (7)
37.	Football Chalonnes-Chaudefonds (9)	1–0	FC St Laurent Malvent (10)
38.	FC Retz (10)	4–2	Mouilleron SF (7)
39.	AS St Pavace (9)	3–2	ASPTT Laval (10)
40.	US Autize Vendée (12)	1–5	FC Mouchamps-Rochetrejoux (9)
41.	JS Solesmienne (10)	2–1	AS Sargéenne (11)
42.	AOS Pontchâteau (11)	2–2 (3–4 p)	ES Pornichet (9)
43.	ES Belleville-sur-Vie (11)	4–6	Foot Espoir 85 (11)
44.	SC Angevin (9)	3–2	ES Bouchemaine (8)
45.	US Les Epesses-St Mars (11)	2–1	AS Longeron-Torfou (10)
46.	Entente Sud Vendée (10)	1–0	US Oie (11)
47.	Pornic Foot (9)	1–3	FC Robretières La Roche-sur-Yon (8)
48.	FC Longuenée-en-Anjou (10)	1–4	US Cantenay-Épinard (9)
49.	Alerte Ahuillé FC (9)	2–3	Angers Vaillante Foot (7)
50.	FC Laurentais Landemontais (9)	4–0	CAS Possosavennières (10)
51.	FC Ruillé-Loiron (10)	1–0	AS Chazé-Vern (11)
52.	Flochamont-sur-Sèvre Football (9)	4–3 (a.e.t.)	AS St Hilaire-Vihiers-St Paul (9)
53.	US Chauché (10)	2–2 (4–5 p)	ASR Machecoul (9)
54.	FC Immaculée (10)	0–2	FC Chapelle-des-Marais (7)
55.	AS Sud Loire (9)	2–1	St Georges FC (10)
56.	BoupèreMonProuant FC (12)	2–2 (4–1 p)	FC Auzay-Chaix (12)
57.	FC Stephanois (12)	4–1 (a.e.t.)	AS Brivet (11)
58.	CS Sablons-Gazonfier (9)	0–1	US Bouloire (10)
59.	US Lucéene (9)	1–0	St Pierre de Retz (8)
60.	Anjou Baconne FC (12)	0–2	St Vincent LUSTVI (11)
61.	St Michel SF (12)	0–1	US Landeronde-St Georges (11)
62.	ES La Romagne-Roussay (11)	1–0	FC Fief Gesté (11)
63.	ASR Vernantes-Vernoil (11)	2–3	AS Valanjou (12)
64.	CO Cormes (11)	2–6	JS Allonnes (9)
65.	US Méral-Cossé (8)	1–3	FE Trélazé (7)
66.	AS Bruffière Defontaine (11)	0–1	FC Mouilleron-Thouarsais-Caillère (8)
67.	RS Les Clouzeaux (11)	4–5 (a.e.t.)	Métallo Sport Chantenaysien (9)
68.	AS St Sylvain-d'Anjou (11)	4–2	SO Candé-Freigné (11)
69.	US St Ouen-St Biez (12)	1–2	OS Dollon (10)
70.	Nort ACF (9)	1–3	USJA Carquefou (7)
71.	Espérance St Yves Nantes (12)	0–1	US Ferrièroise (11)
72.	FC Pellouailles-Corze (10)	2–3	RC Doué-la-Fontaine (9)
73.	FC Falleron-Froidfond (11)	1–4	ES Marais (10)
74.	Larchamp LMFC (11)	2–1	US Le Genest (9)
75.	Internationale du Mans (12)	1–2	US Cigné (10)
76.	St Joseph de Porterie Nantes (11)	3–1	Héric FC (12)
77.	AS Clermont-Créans (12)	1–2	CO Laigné-St Gervais (10)
78.	Hermitage Venansault (11)	5–0	US Bazoges Beaurepaire (11)
79.	AS Neuville-sur-Sarthe (11)	1–0	US St Mars-la-Brière (8)
80.	Gorron FC (9)	1–2	US Fougerolles (10)
81.	US Loire et Divatte (8)	3–2 (a.e.t.)	La Chaize FEC (7)
82.	JF Boissière-des-Landes (11)	0–4	SA St Florent-des-Bois (11)
83.	ÉS Trélazé (9)	1–2	AS Bayard-Saumur (8)
84.	Energie Le May-sur-Èvre (9)	1–3	NDC Angers (8)
85.	US Roézé (8)	1–2	Intrépide Angers Foot (8)
86.	AS Étival (11)	0–3	US Bazouges-Cré (8)
87.	AS Contest-St Baudelle (10)	0–7	ES Moncé (7)
88.	Union St Leger-St Germain-Champtocé (11)	1–0	US Varades (10)
89.	Olympique Ste Gemmes-sur-Loire (11)	2–1	ES Andard-Brain (9)
90.	St Herblain OC (10)	2–1	Écureils des Pays de Monts (9)
91.	Nantes St Pierre (9)	0–4	AS Sautronnaise (7)
92.	Fillé Sport (12)	1–6 (a.e.t.)	CS Changé (8)
93.	Hirondelle Football (9)	0–3	Pouzages Bocage FC (7)
94.	US Chantrigné (11)	2–1	JS Parigné-l'Évêque (9)
95.	FC Côte Sauvage (10)	2–3	ES Vigneux (9)
96.	US La Chapelle-d'Aligné (12)	3–2	AC Longué (10)
97.	FC Ambrières (10)	0–4	EG Rouillon (8)
98.	SC Ste Gemmes-d'Andigné (11)	2–1	US Soudan (11)
99.	Etoile du Bocage (12)	1–6	Mareuil SC (8)
100.	JA St Mars-du-Désert (9)	0–1	Nantes La Mellinet (8)
101.	US Bouguenais (13)	1–3 (a.e.t.)	FC Givrand l'Aiguillon (12)
102.	Élan de Gorges Foot (8)	0–1	AC Basse-Goulaine (7)
103.	FC La Garnache (12)	0–1	ES du Lac (11)
104.	ASAG La Haye-Fouassière (8)	0–6	St Sébastien FC (7)
105.	ES Vallet (11)	1–2 (a.e.t.)	US Aubigny (9)
106.	Voltigeurs St Georges-Buttavent (11)	0–4	AS La Chapelle-St-Aubin (8)
107.	Océane FC (12)	1–3	ES Grosbreuil (10)
108.	ASD Noyantais (12)	1–3	FC Villevêque-Soucelles (11)
109.	FC Bout' Loire-et-Evre (12)	0–2	FC St Lambert-St Jean-St Léger-St Martin (11)
110.	Club du Haut Layon (11)	0–2	JS Brion (12)
111.	FC Brennois Boiséen (9)	0–1	St Aubin-Guérande Football (7)
112.	FC Nyoiseau/Bouillé-Ménard/Grugé-l'Hôpital (12)	2–10	FC Louet-Juignéen (12)
113.	JS du Layon (12)	0–2	US St Georges-sur-Loire (11)
114.	US St Clément-de-la-Place (13)	1–3	CS Lion d'Angers (12)
115.	Abbaretz-Saffré FC (11)	0–1 (a.e.t.)	Louverné Sports (7)
116.	CS Javron-Neuilly (11)	0–4	US Nautique Spay (7)
117.	FC Presqu'île Vilaine (11)	0–1	La Malouine Football (9)
118.	St Marc Football (11)	1–3	AS La Madeleine (10)
119.	Sympho Foot Treillières (10)	1–1 (1–4 p)	ES Blain (8)
120.	Herbadilla Foot (12)	0–2	FC Entente du Vignoble (11)
121.	FC Chabossière (10)	1–1 (2–3 p)	AC Chapelain Foot (7)
122.	AS Grandchamp Foot (12)	3–6	SC Avessac-Fégréac (11)
123.	Eclair de Chauvé (13)	0–4	ACS Dervallières (12)
124.	AS Mésanger (12)	0–0 (4–5 p)	FC Castel-Fiacrais (10)
125.	AS Avrillé (9)	4–0 (a.e.t.)	USA Pouancé (8)
126.	USJA St Martin-Aviré-Louvaine (12)	3–1	CA Vouvantais/US Glainoise (11)
127.	US Combrée-Bel-Air-Noyant (11)	3–3 (4–2 p)	SC Nord Atlantique (10)
128.	CA Voutréen (11)	1–2	La Patriote Bonnétable (8)

== Third round ==
These matches were played on 9 and 10 September 2017.

Third round results: Pays de la Loire

Tie no	Home team (tier)	Score	Away team (tier)
1.	FC Guémené-Massérac (13)	0–2	US La Baule-Le Pouliguen (7)
2.	BoupèreMonProuant FC (12)	1–4	St Sébastien FC (7)
3.	RC Doué-la-Fontaine (9)	3–1	EG Rouillon (8)
4.	SA St Florent-des-Bois (11)	0–2	ASC St Médard-de-Doulon Nantes (9)
5.	JS Brion (12)	0–3	St Joseph de Porterie Nantes (11)
6.	SC Ste Gemmes-d'Andigné (11)	0–5	SO Maine (6)
7.	Flochamont-sur-Sèvre Football (9)	0–6	Olympique Saumur FC (6)
8.	ES Connerré (6)	3–2 (a.e.t.)	SC Beaucouzé (6)
9.	ES Blain (8)	3–0	RS Ardelay (9)
10.	JS Solesmienne (10)	1–2	USSA Vertou (5)
11.	AS Seiches-sur-le-Loire-Marcé (9)	6–2	AS St Jean-d'Assé (10)
12.	Française Pontvallain (11)	0–5	US Beaufort-en-Vallée (8)
13.	AS St Pavace (9)	0–8	AS Mulsanne-Teloché (5)
14.	St Herblain OC (10)	0–8	AS La Châtaigneraie (6)
15.	US Landeronde-St Georges (11)	2–5	Union St Leger-St Germain-Champtocé (11)
16.	US Crosmièroise (10)	0–1 (a.e.t.)	La Flèche RC (5)
17.	FC Chapelle-des-Marais (7)	1–2 (a.e.t.)	St Aubin-Guérande Football (7)
18.	AS Sud Loire (9)	2–5	US Philbertine Football (7)
19.	Louverné Sports (7)	1–4	Patriote Brulonnaise (6)
20.	US Conlie (10)	1–3	US Nautique Spay (7)
21.	AS La Chapelle-St-Aubin (8)	1–1 (4–5 p)	ES Bonchamp (6)
22.	TVEC Les Sables-d'Olonne (6)	3–0	USJA Carquefou (7)
23.	US Marans (11)	0–1	JS Allonnes (9)
24.	ES Vigneux (9)	2–2 (5–4 p)	La Roche VF (5)
25.	NDC Angers (8)	6–0	CA Evronnais (8)
26.	AS La Madeleine (10)	3–0	FC Entente du Vignoble (11)
27.	AS Valanjou (12)	1–3	AS Sautronnaise (7)
28.	FC Villevêque-Soucelles (11)	2–2 (5–3 p)	SC Angevin (9)
29.	US La Chapelle-d'Aligné (12)	0–4	US Bazouges-Cré (8)
30.	US Cantenay-Épinard (9)	0–4	JS Coulaines (6)
31.	FC Givrand l'Aiguillon (12)	2–3 (a.e.t.)	ES Grosbreuil (10)
32.	US Bouloire (10)	3–0	FC St Lambert-St Jean-St Léger-St Martin (11)
33.	Hermitage Venansault (11)	1–2 (a.e.t.)	ASR Machecoul (9)
34.	FC Stephanois (12)	0–4	Ancienne Château-Gontier (6)
35.	AS Neuville-sur-Sarthe (11)	0–2	Intrépide Angers Foot (8)
36.	Croix Blanche Angers (9)	0–1	FC Essartais (7)
37.	CS Lion d'Angers (12)	1–1 (8–7 p)	US Cigné (10)
38.	LSG Les Brouzils (9)	2–2 (4–5 p)	La Malouine Football (9)
39.	ES Côte de Lumière (8)	1–5	St Nazaire AF (6)
40.	AS St Pierre-Montrevault (7)	1–2	UF St Herblain (7)
41.	US Lucéene (9)	0–2	FC Challans (5)
42.	FC Retz (10)	4–0	FC Laurentais Landemontais (9)
43.	SC Avessac-Fégréac (11)	4–1	US Combrée-Bel-Air-Noyant (11)
44.	Métallo Sport Chantenaysien (9)	4–5 (a.e.t.)	US Loire et Divatte (8)
45.	Entente Sud Vendée (10)	0–2	US Les Epesses-St Mars (11)
46.	Landreau-Loroux OSC (11)	0–5	AC Basse-Goulaine (7)
47.	CO Laigné-St Gervais (10)	0–0 (1–3 p)	AS Le Mans Villaret (7)
48.	Stade Olonnais (9)	0–0 (4–5 p)	Pouzages Bocage FC (7)
49.	St Vincent LUSTVI (11)	0–1	ES Pornichet (9)
50.	FC Mouchamps-Rochetrejoux (9)	3–0	FC Bouaine Rocheservière (10)
51.	CA Loué (10)	3–3 (3–4 p)	US Guécélard (7)
52.	AC St Brevin (9)	0–1 (a.e.t.)	ESOF La Roche-sur-Yon (7)
53.	US Chantenay-Villedieu (10)	1–4	AS Avrillé (9)
54.	AS Bayard-Saumur (8)	0–3	Stade Mayennais FC (6)
55.	Larchamp LMFC (11)	1–5	CO St Saturnin Arche (6)
56.	Football Chalonnes-Chaudefonds (9)	1–7	JSC Bellevue Nantes (6)
57.	FF Mortagne-sur-Sèvre (11)	1–2	ES Marais (10)
58.	US St Georges-sur-Loire (11)	1–8	Vendée Poiré-sur-Vie Football (5)
59.	AS St Sylvain-d'Anjou (11)	3–2 (a.e.t.)	AEPR Rezé (9)
60.	ACS Dervallières (12)	2–1	FC Louet-Juignéen (12)
61.	CS Changé (8)	0–1	Angers Vaillante Foot (7)
62.	FC Ruillé-Loiron (10)	0–4	AS Bourny Laval (6)
63.	FC Cantonal Sud Vendée (12)	3–3 (5–4 p)	Val de Sèvre Football (10)
64.	US Ferrièroise (11)	2–4	Sud Vendée Football (9)
65.	FC Mouilleron-Thouarsais-Caillère (8)	0–3	Sablé FC (5)
66.	AS Tiercé-Cheffes (8)	2–0	VS Fertois (6)
67.	Nantes La Mellinet (8)	1–1 (5–3 p)	ES Aubance (9)
68.	FC Pays de Sillé (9)	0–1	ES Moncé (7)
69.	FC Robretières La Roche-sur-Yon (8)	1–3	Mareuil SC (8)
70.	Foot Espoir 85 (11)	0–3	AC Chapelain Foot (7)
71.	Christophe-Séguinière (10)	0–1	Voltigeurs de Châteaubriant (5)
72.	ES La Romagne-Roussay (11)	0–1	US Aubigny (9)
73.	FE Trélazé (7)	1–3	US Changé (5)
74.	ES du Lac (11)	1–4	ES Segré (6)
75.	Olympique Ste Gemmes-sur-Loire (11)	1–0	La Patriote Bonnétable (8)
76.	OS Dollon (10)	0–4	Ernéenne Foot (7)
77.	FC Castel-Fiacrais (10)	0–2	Orvault SF (6)
78.	USJA St Martin-Aviré-Louvaine (12)	2–1	US Fougerolles (10)
79.	US Chantrigné (11)	0–2	SA Mamertins (6)
80.	La Suze FC (5)	0–0 (4–2 p)	FC Rezé (6)

== Fourth round ==
These matches were played on 23 and 24 September 2017.

Fourth round results: Pays de la Loire

Tie no	Home team (tier)	Score	Away team (tier)
1.	US Aubigny (9)	0–1	ES Grosbreuil (10)
2.	UF St Herblain (7)	3–3 (2–4 p)	La Suze FC (5)
3.	USSA Vertou (5)	0–1	TVEC Les Sables-d'Olonne (6)
4.	Patriote Brulonnaise (6)	0–4	Le Mans FC (4)
5.	US Beaufort-en-Vallée (8)	0–1	Olympique Saumur FC (6)
6.	ASR Machecoul (9)	0–1	ES Bonchamp (6)
7.	AC Basse-Goulaine (7)	2–2 (6–5 p)	Sablé FC (5)
8.	US Nautique Spay (7)	1–1 (3–4 p)	SO Maine (6)
9.	US Bazouges-Cré (8)	0–4	US Changé (5)
10.	AS La Madeleine (10)	1–4	NDC Angers (8)
11.	St Sébastien FC (7)	1–0	ESOF La Roche-sur-Yon (7)
12.	FC Cantonal Sud Vendée (12)	3–1	US Guécélard (7)
13.	Ernéenne Foot (7)	1–0	Vendée Poiré-sur-Vie Football (5)
14.	ACS Dervallières (12)	1–2	ES Marais (10)
15.	USJA St Martin-Aviré-Louvaine (12)	2–0	Olympique Ste Gemmes-sur-Loire (11)
16.	Sud Vendée Football (9)	2–3	Mareuil SC (8)
17.	US Les Epesses-St Mars (11)	2–6	Ancienne Château-Gontier (6)
18.	AS Tiercé-Cheffes (8)	0–3	JSC Bellevue Nantes (6)
19.	AS La Châtaigneraie (6)	0–1 (a.e.t.)	Pouzages Bocage FC (7)
20.	ES Vigneux (9)	0–2 (a.e.t.)	US La Baule-Le Pouliguen (7)
21.	US Loire et Divatte (8)	1–7	Voltigeurs de Châteaubriant (5)
22.	US Philbertine Football (7)	0–1	JS Coulaines (6)
23.	AS Sautronnaise (7)	4–0	AS Bourny Laval (6)
24.	Union St Leger-St Germain-Champtocé (11)	1–1 (2–4 p)	La Malouine Football (9)
25.	US Bouloire (10)	0–1	Nantes La Mellinet (8)
26.	CS Lion d'Angers (12)	0–4	Orvault SF (6)
27.	ES Pornichet (9)	0–1	AS Le Mans Villaret (7)
28.	ASC St Médard-de-Doulon Nantes (9)	1–2	SA Mamertins (6)
29.	Intrépide Angers Foot (8)	1–2 (a.e.t.)	Vendée Fontenay Foot (4)
30.	FC Essartais (7)	3–1	Stade Mayennais FC (6)
31.	AS Seiches-sur-le-Loire-Marcé (9)	1–2	ES Connerré (6)
32.	AS Avrillé (9)	1–2	AS Mulsanne-Teloché (5)
33.	FC Villevêque-Soucelles (11)	0–3	St Aubin-Guérande Football (7)
34.	ES Blain (8)	1–2	ES Segré (6)
35.	ES Moncé (7)	1–4 (a.e.t.)	La Flèche RC (5)
36.	AS St Sylvain-d'Anjou (11)	1–7	RC Doué-la-Fontaine (9)
37.	JS Allonnes (9)	0–3	FC Challans (5)
38.	CO St Saturnin Arche (6)	1–2	St Nazaire AF (6)
39.	SC Avessac-Fégréac (11)	3–1	Angers Vaillante Foot (7)
40.	FC Mouchamps-Rochetrejoux (9)	1–0	FC Retz (10)
41.	St Joseph de Porterie Nantes (11)	0–2	AC Chapelain Foot (7)

== Fifth round ==
These matches were played on 7 and 8 October 2017.

Fifth round results: Pays de la Loire

Tie no	Home team (tier)	Score	Away team (tier)
1.	AS Le Mans Villaret (7)	0–2	Stade Lavallois (3)
2.	La Malouine Football (9)	0–1	AS Mulsanne-Teloché (5)
3.	Voltigeurs de Châteaubriant (5)	1–0	ES Segré (6)
4.	SA Mamertins (6)	1–2	St Sébastien FC (7)
5.	Nantes La Mellinet (8)	0–1	SO Maine (6)
6.	JS Coulaines (6)	1–4	Les Herbiers VF (3)
7.	Orvault SF (6)	3–2 (a.e.t.)	La Suze FC (5)
8.	NDC Angers (8)	2–1 (a.e.t.)	FC Mouchamps-Rochetrejoux (9)
9.	ES Bonchamp (6)	0–2	SO Cholet (3)
10.	ES Grosbreuil (10)	0–2	Olympique Saumur FC (6)
11.	FC Cantonal Sud Vendée (12)	0–4	US Changé (5)
12.	St Nazaire AF (6)	1–1 (4–2 p)	La Flèche RC (5)
13.	FC Essartais (7)	4–2	AC Basse-Goulaine (7)
14.	USJA St Martin-Aviré-Louvaine (12)	0–8	Vendée Fontenay Foot (4)
15.	TVEC Les Sables-d'Olonne (6)	5–1	AS Sautronnaise (7)
16.	US La Baule-Le Pouliguen (7)	0–2	Le Mans FC (4)
17.	RC Doué-la-Fontaine (9)	0–3	FC Challans (5)
18.	SC Avessac-Fégréac (11)	1–4 (a.e.t.)	Mareuil SC (8)
19.	Ancienne Château-Gontier (6)	2–1	Ernéenne Foot (7)
20.	ES Marais (10)	1–3	JSC Bellevue Nantes (6)
21.	ES Connerré (6)	2–5 (a.e.t.)	Pouzages Bocage FC (7)
22.	St Aubin-Guérande Football (7)	2–3	AC Chapelain Foot (7)

== Sixth round ==
These matches were played on 21 and 22 October 2017.

Sixth round results: Pays de la Loire

Tie no	Home team (tier)	Score	Away team (tier)
1.	Mareuil SC (8)	0–2	SO Cholet (3)
2.	Voltigeurs de Châteaubriant (5)	1–5 (a.e.t.)	Les Herbiers VF (3)
3.	Vendée Fontenay Foot (4)	0–0 (3–5 p)	US Changé (5)
4.	Pouzages Bocage FC (7)	1–3 (a.e.t.)	Le Mans FC (4)
5.	AS Mulsanne-Teloché (5)	1–3	Ancienne Château-Gontier (6)
6.	FC Challans (5)	0–2	JSC Bellevue Nantes (6)
7.	AC Chapelain Foot (7)	1–1 (4–2 p)	St Nazaire AF (6)
8.	St Sébastien FC (7)	0–1	TVEC Les Sables-d'Olonne (6)
9.	FC Essartais (7)	2–1	Orvault SF (6)
10.	NDC Angers (8)	0–1	Stade Lavallois (3)
11.	Olympique Saumur FC (6)	3–0	SO Maine (6)
