= 2022–23 Coupe de France preliminary rounds, Pays de la Loire =

The 2022–23 Coupe de France preliminary rounds, Pays de la Loire is the qualifying competition to decide which teams from the leagues of the Pays de la Loire region of France take part in the main competition from the seventh round.

A total of eleven teams will qualify from the Pays de la Loire preliminary rounds.

In 2021–22, La Roche VF progressed furthest in the main competition, reaching the round of 32, where they lost to eventual semi-finalists FC Versailles 78.

== Draws and fixtures ==
On 19 July 2022, the league confirmed 522 teams had entered the competition. On 21 July 2022 the draw for the first round was published, with 221 matches featuring teams from Régional 3 and the district sides, with just two Régional 3 sides receiving byes to the second round.

The second round draw was published on 30 August 2022, with 41 teams (from Régional 2 and the exempted Régional 3 sides) entering.

The third round draw was made on 7 September 2022, with 19 teams from Régional 1 and 12 from Championnat National 3 joining the 131 qualifiers from the second round, for a total of 81 fixtures.

The fourth round draw was made live on the leagues official Facebook page on 14 September 2022. The three teams from Championnat National 2 joined the competition at this stage.

The fifth round draw took place on 29 September 2022, with the two teams from Championnat National joining the competition at this stage. The sixth round draw took place in an Intermarché shop in La Roche-sur-Yon on 11 October 2022.

=== First round ===
These matches were played on 27 and 28 August 2022.

First round results: Pays de la Loire
Tie no	Home team (tier)	Score	Away team (tier)
1.	Saint-Vincent LUSTVI (11)	0–0 (9–10 p)	FC Craonnais (8)
2.	FC Achards (8)	2–1 (Note: Tie reversed from original draw.)	AS Moutiers-Saint-Avaugourd (10)
3.	FC Presqu'île Vilaine (10)	2–6	ES Maritime (9)
4.	US Vion (10)	0–3	ES Morannes (10)
5.	ES Val Baugeois (11)	1–3	SS Noyen-sur-Sarthe (8)
6.	Les Touches FC (11)	4–1	FC Chaudron Saint-Quentin (11)
7.	FC Castelvarennais (11)	3–2	Métallo Sport Chantenaysien (11)
8.	FC Vallons le Pin (10)	3–1	FC Laurentais Landemontais (9)
9.	FC Fief Gesté (9)	2–4	US Thouaré (8)
10.	US Dionysienne (9)	0–0 (5–4 p)	AS Saint-Sylvain-d'Anjou (9)
11.	UF Allonnes-Brain-sur-Allonnes (9)	6–0	SC Anjou (9)
12.	EA Baugeois (9)	8–0	AS Cérans-Foulletourte (11)
13.	CS Parcéen (11)	0–1	FC Pellouailles-Corze (9)
14.	CS Lion d'Angers (9)	3–2	US Guécélard (9)
15.	ES La Romagne-Roussay (10)	3–1	ES Belligné-Chapelle-Maumusson (10)
16.	AS Vivy-Neuillé 90 (11)	1–2	US Mansigné (8)
17.	Le Cellier-Mauves FC (9)	1–2	Olympique Liré-Drain (8)
18.	ASR Vernantes-Vernoil (10)	2–1	CO Castélorien (8)
19.	FC Fuilet-Chaussaire (10)	1–3	Landreau-Loroux OSC (8)
20.	Ajax Daumeray Football (11)	1–3	US Bazouges-Cré (9)
21.	AS Longeron-Torfou (9)	0–4	FC Côteaux du Vignoble (9)
22.	AC Longué (11)	1–1 (4–2 p)	JS Solesmienne (9)
23.	JS Ludoise (10)	4–2	Aiglons Durtalois (11)
24.	AS Riezaise (12)	0–6	ES du Lac (10)
25.	FC Falleron-Froidfond (10)	0–3	AS Maine (9)
26.	FC Basse Loire (10)	2–0	FC Île de Noirmoutier (10)
27.	Océane FC (11)	2–0	FC Garnachois (10)
28.	US La Chapelle-d'Aligné (11)	2–3	AS Le Bailleul Crosmières (10)
29.	US Villaines-Malicorne (10)	1–0	Fillé Sports (11)
30.	Est Anjou FC (11)	3–4	FC Val du Loir (9)
31.	FC Plessis Grammoire (11)	0–4	Écommoy FC (8)
32.	Eclair de Chauvé (10)	3–4	US Bequots-Lucquois (8)
33.	USM Beauvoir-sur-Mer (11)	0–4	Herbadilla Foot (11)
34.	AFC Bouin-Bois-de-Céné-Châteauneuf (11)	3–2	Bernerie OCA (11)
35.	ASPTT Laval (10)	0–2	FC Saint-Saturnin-La Milesse (8)
36.	Anjou Baconne FC (11)	4–0	ES Azé (10)
37.	FC Ménil (10)	1–5	FC Longuenée-en-Anjou (9)
38.	AS Saint-Jean-d'Assé (10)	1–2	US Pays de Juhel (8)
39.	ES Champfleur (10)	2–0	US Argentré (10)
40.	FC Louplande (10)	0–3 (Note: Tie won by means of forfeit.)	US Saint-Berthevin (8)
41.	AS Fyé (11)	1–3	US Pré-en-Pail (9)
42.	FC Pays de Sillé (9)	1–4	AS Contest-Saint Baudelle (8)
43.	FC Rouez-Crissé (10)	0–1	AS Martigné-sur-Mayenne (8)
44.	FC Saint-Georges-Pruillé (10)	0–1	JA Soulgé-sur-Ouette (8)
45.	US Tennie-Saint-Symphorien (11)	0–4	AS Meslay-du-Maine (8)
46.	AS Clermont-Créans (9)	3–3 (5–4 p)	CA Évronnais (8)
47.	AS Juigné-sur-Sarthe (9)	0–3	US Entrammes (8)
48.	US Aubinoise (11)	0–8 (Note: Hermine Saint-Ouennaise penalised for fielding a suspended player, US Aubinoise qualify.)	Hermine Saint-Ouennaise (8)
49.	AS Ballée (10)	0–1	FC de l'Aisne (10)
50.	CO Laigné-Ssint-Gervais (10)	1–3	US Alpes Mancelles (10)
51.	FC Entente du Vignoble (10)	4–0	FC Villedieu-La Renaudière (12)
52.	ARC Tillières (11)	0–0 (5–4 p)	FC Gétigné-Boussay (10)
53.	AS Saint-Gervais (11)	1–0	Alliance Sud-Retz Machecoul (9)
54.	Hirondelles Soullandaises (11)	0–2	FC Retz (8)
55.	ES Vallet (9)	1–0	RS Ardelay (9)
56.	US Villepôt (12)	1–2	AS Chemazé (10)
57.	AS Châtres-la-Forêt (11)	0–3	CA Loué (9)
58.	US Forcé (9)	5–0	US Arnage Pontlieue (8)
59.	FC Sud Ouest Mayennais (10)	0–2 (Note: AL Châteaubriant penalised for fielding two suspended players. FC Sud Ouest Mayennais qualify.)	AL Châteaubriant (8)
60.	USC Pays de Montsurs (9)	3–0	Beaumont SA (8)
61.	AS Vaiges (9)	1–4	US Conlie Domfront (9)
62.	Saint-Martin Treize Septiers (10)	0–5	ES Montilliers (8)
63.	US Bernardière-Cugand (9)	0–4	AS Saint-Hilaire-Vihiers-Saint-Paul (8)
64.	Christophe-Séguinière (8)	2–1	FC Bouaine Rocheservière (9)
65.	US Les Epesses-Saint-Mars (9)	1–2	EA La Tessoualle (8)
66.	FC Saint-Laurent Malvent (9)	4–0	AS Valanjou (10)
67.	AS Le-Puy-Saint-Bonnet (9)	3–4	Sèvremont FC (8)
68.	JF Boissière-des-Landes (11)	1–1 (2–4 p)	FC Saint-Julien-Vairé (10)
69.	US Herminoise (10)	0–1	FC Cantonal Sud Vendée (9)
70.	FC Vallée du Graon (11)	3–2	FC Nieul-Maillezais-Les Autises (10)
71.	Foot Espoir 85 (10)	2–0	Sud Vendée Football (8)
72.	AS Quatre Vents Fontaines (10)	0–3	Entente Cheffois-Antigny-Saint-Maurice (8)
73.	AS Dom-Tom (10)	0–4	Pays de Chantonnay Foot (8)
74.	SSJA Saint-Mathurin (11)	0–5	Espoir du Marais Sallertaine (10)
75.	US Autize Vendée (10)	0–4	FC Plaine et Bocage (8)
76.	AS Sigournais-Saint Germain (11)	0–6	Entente Sud Vendée (10)
77.	FC Robretières La Roche-sur-Yon (9)	4–0	SO Fougeré-Thorigny (12)
78.	US Vouvant Bourneau Cezais (12)	2–4	US Bournezeau-Saint-Hilaire (9)
79.	AS Damvitaise (12)	0–1	FC Mouilleron-Thouarsais-Caillère (9)
80.	Degré FC (10)	0–2	La Patriote Bonnétable (8)
81.	ES Moncé (8)	8–0	US Saint-Ouen Saint-Biez (10)
82.	ASPTT Le Mans (9)	1–1 (5–4 p)	ES Yvré-l'Évêque (8)
83.	US Vibraysienne (8)	2–0	ÉS Connerré (11)
84.	EG Rouillon (9)	3–0	GSI Saosnois Courgains (10)
85.	Lombron Sports (10)	1–1 (3–4 p)	JS Parigné-l'Évêque (9)
86.	Gazélec Le Mans (10)	4–2	Internationale du Mans (9)
87.	US Glonnières (9)	2–1	US Savigné-l'Évêque (10)
88.	US Challes-Grand Lucé (10)	6–1	CO Cormes (9)
89.	Football Champagné Sport (11)	1–4	US Saint-Mars-la-Brière (9)
90.	ES Montfort-le-Gesnois (10)	0–5	AS Ruaudin (8)
91.	Val de Sèvre Football (10)	0–3	Saint-Pierre Mazières (8)
92.	SomloirYzernay CPF (9)	4–0	Vigilante Saint Fulgent (8)
93.	Maybéléger FC (10)	6–0	AS Boufféré (8)
94.	Saint-Michel SF (11)	1–0 (Note: Saint-Michel SF penalised for fielding a suspended player, JFF Cholet qualify.)	JFF Cholet (10)
95.	Cholet FC 2020 (10)	1–8	FC Mouchamps-Rochetrejoux (9)
96.	FC Cécilien Martinoyen (8)	1–1 (3–4 p)	Saint-Georges Trémentines FC (9)
97.	AS Mauges (11)	0–1	BoupèreMonProuant FC (10)
98.	AS Saint-Pavace (10)	1–3	US La Chapelle-Saint-Rémy (9)
99.	EB Commer (11)	7–5	AS Étival (10)
100.	AS Neuville-sur-Sarthe (10)	1–2	Louverné Sports (8)
101.	SC Sainte-Gemmes-d'Andigné (9)	0–1	US Méral-Cossé (8)
102.	AS Chazé-Vern (11)	2–1	JS Laval Maghreb (9)
103.	US Alverne (11)	1–3	FC Château-Gontier (8)
104.	FC OsmanliSport (11)	0–4	SC Nord Atlantique (8)
105.	AS Parné (10)	1–1 (1–3 p)	Athletic Laigné-Loigné (9)
106.	AS Mont-Saint-Jean (11)	0–4	FC La Bazoge (8)
107.	Étoile Mouzillon Foot (10)	3–3 (4–5 p)	USSA Montréverd (10)
108.	AS Bruffière Defontaine (10)	1–3	US Toutlemonde Maulévrier (9)
109.	US Bazoges Beaurepaire (10)	1–1 (3–2 p)	FC Beaupréau La Chapelle (8)
110.	Olympique Sal-Tour Vézins Coron (10)	6–1	US Gouldoisienne (10)
111.	Gaubretière-Saint-Martin FC (10)	0–4	Andrezé-Jub-Jallais FC (8)
112.	FF Mortagne-sur-Sèvre (10)	3–2	Étoile de Clisson (8)
113.	Saint-Georges Guyonnière FC (9)	3–2	Legé FC (11)
114.	La Vigilante Mayet (9)	3–2	SC Luceau (10)
115.	AS Sargéenne (10)	1–2	US Bouloire (10)
116.	Sainte-Jamme Sportive (11)	3–7	SC Tuffé (10)
117.	FC Meilleraie-Montournais-Menomblet (10)	0–4	Saint-André-Saint-Macaire FC (8)
118.	US Combrée-Bel-Air-Noyant (10)	3–3 (5–4 p)	AS Mésanger (10)
119.	USJA Saint-Martin-Aviré-Louvaine (10)	2–1	ASL L'Huisserie Foot (9)
120.	CA Vouvantais/US Glainoise	0–3	FC Pouëze-Saint-Clément-Brain (10)
121.	AG Champigné-Querré (11)	1–0	AS Sion-Lusanger (12)
122.	FC Bout' Loire-et-Evre (11)	2–0	Réveil Saint-Géréon (10)
123.	Pomjeannais JA (9)	5–0	Herblanetz FC (11)
124.	ES Layon (10)	3–0	USC Corné (11)
125.	AS Écouflant (11)	0–6	SC Angevin (10)
126.	Olympique Saint-Gemmes-sur-Loire (10)	1–1 (1–3 p)	Intrépide Angers Foot (8)
127.	Saint-Melaine OS (10)	0–4	Angers Vaillante Foot (8)
128.	AC Belle Beille Angers (13)	2–4	ÉS Trélazé (10)
129.	AS Ponts-de-Cé (10)	0–3	Croix Blanche Angers (8)
130.	ASVR Ambillou-Château (10)	1–1 (3–4 p)	AS Bayard-Saumur (9)
131.	Saint MathMénitRé FC (10)	0–1	RC Doué-la-Fontaine (8)
132.	AS Avrillé (10)	2–1	AS Seiches-sur-le-Loire-Marcé (8)
133.	AS Tiercé-Cheffes (8)	0–0 (4–3 p)	AS Val-d'Erdre-Auxence (10)
134.	FC Villevêque-Soucelles (10)	0–1	US Cantenay-Épinard (8)
135.	US Villiers-Charlemagne (10)	2–5	ASO Montenay (9)
136.	FC La Brûlatte La Gravelle (12)	0–5	Larchamp-Montaudin FC (11)
137.	US Aronnaise (9)	2–2 (4–5 p)	US Fougerolles-du-Plessis (9)
138.	Association de l'Unité Mayennaise Laval (11)	2–4	Ambrières Cigné Football (9)
139.	US Saint-Germain Vallée d'Orthe (10)	0–3	AS Andouillé (9)
140.	CF Châtelais-Nyoiseau-Bouillé-Grugé (10)	1–1 (3–1 p)	Alerte Ahuillé FC (9)
141.	ES Quelainaise (10)	0–2	Olympique Bécon-Villemoisan-Saint-Augustin (9)
142.	FA Laval (10)	0–5	USA Pouancé (8)
143.	Loups Sportifs Sainte-Flaive-des-Loups (10)	0–3	US La Ferrière Dompierre (9)
144.	ES Longevillaise (10)	1–0	US Aubigny (8)
145.	FC Talmondais (10)	1–2	Hermitage Venansault (10)
146.	Saint-Gilles-Saint-Hilaire FC (10)	0–8	ES Marsouins Brétignolles-Brem (8)
147.	Sainte-Foy FC (10)	1–3	ES Grosbreuil-Girouard (9)
148.	La Chaize FEC (8)	0–1	FC La Génétouze (8)
149.	ES Rives de l'Yon (10)	2–1	Étoile de Vie Le Fenouiller (8)
150.	AS Saint-Maixent-sur-Vie (10)	1–3	Écureils des Pays de Monts (8)
151.	FC Saint-Philbert-Réorthe-Jaudonnière (11)	1–1 (4–5 p)	US Mesnard-Vendrennes (11)
152.	FC Tiffauges Les Landes (11)	1–4	FO Cope Chauché (9)
153.	AS Paludiers Islais Île-d'Olonne (11)	1–5	Saint-Pierre Sportif Nieul-le-Dolent (9)
154.	Entente Givrand-L'Aiguillon-Landevieille FC (11)	0–5	FC Jard-Avrillé (8)
155.	Entente Saint-Paul Maché (11)	2–3	Commequiers SF (9)
156.	Les Farfadets Saint-Paul-en-Pareds (11)	1–2	FC Généraudière Roche Sud (9)
157.	JA Nesmy (11)	1–1 (4–3 p)	FC Saligny (9)
158.	US Landeronde-Saint-Georges (11)	0–0 (5–4 p)	US Saint-Michel Triaize La Tranche Angles (10)
159.	RS Les Clouzeaux (11)	1–2	ES Saint-Denis-la-Chevasse (9)
160.	ES Belleville-sur-Vie (10)	2–1	FC Chavagnes-La Rabatelière (9)
161.	AF Apremont-La Chapelle (11)	0–3	Coëx Olympique (10)
162.	US Désertines (11)	3–3 (4–2 p)	USB Juvigné (10)
163.	US La Bigottière-Alexain (11)	2–3	Brecé Sports (11)
164.	AJS Frambaldéenne (10)	3–5	FC Landivy-Pontmain (10)
165.	FC Ruillé-Loiron (10)	0–1	FC Lassay (8)
166.	AS Grazay (11)	0–5	US Chantrigné (9)
167.	FC Montjean (11)	0–3	Voltigeurs Saint-Georges-Buttavent (10)
168.	CS Saint-Pierre-des-Landes (10)	4–0	Gorron FC (9)
169.	US Parigné-sur-Braye (10)	0–1	AS Le Bourgneuf-la-Forêt (9)
170.	Placé FC (11)	2–3	ASL Montigné-le-Brillant (10)
171.	FS Champgenéteux (12)	0–9	US Le Genest (10)
172.	US Soudan (10)	0–6	US Saint-Pierre Port-Brillet (8)
173.	Abbaretz-Saffré FC (9)	3–4	US Laval (8)
174.	Les Côteaux de la Roche (12)	1–3	FC Mesnilaurentais (10)
175.	ES Daguenière Bohalle (11)	0–0 (3–4 p)	AS Salle-Aubry-Poitevinière (11)
176.	FC Saint-Lambert Saint-Jean Saint-Léger Saint-Martin (11)	1–1 (3–4 p)	JS Layon (12)
177.	US Mazé (11)	2–1	FC Louet-Juignéen (11)
178.	US Saint-Georges-sur-Loire (11)	0–0 (4–3 p)	Sainte Christine-Bourgneuf FC (11)
179.	Union Saint-Leger-Saint-Germain-Champtocé Avenir (10)	1–0	ES Andard-Brain (8)
180.	Doutre SC (11)	3–2	ES Loire et Louet (11)
181.	Saint-Barthélémy-d'Anjou Foot (10)	3–2	AS Lac de Maine (8)
182.	ES Gennes-Les Rosiers (11)	0–4	FC Layon (9)
183.	Union Méan Penhoët Saint-Nazaire (11)	1–5	AS La Madeleine (9)
184.	Savenay-Malville-Prinquiau FC (9)	1–2	Saint-Aubin-Guérande Football (8)
185.	FC Immaculée (10)	4–1	AS Guillaumois (11)
186.	FC Côte Sauvage (10)	1–3	FC Brière (9)
187.	Amicale Saint-Lyphard (10)	1–4	AOS Pontchâteau (9)
188.	CS Montoirin (9)	0–0 (7–6 p)	Saint-Marc Football (8)
189.	Alerte de Méan (10)	0–3	Saint-Cyr Foot Herbignac (10)
190.	Donges FC (9)	1–0	La Saint-André (8)
191.	ES des Marais (9)	1–4	ES Vertou (9)
192.	FC Goëlands Sainte-Marie-sur-Mer (12)	0–8	ES Pornichet (8)
193.	AS Sud Loire (10)	1–1 (6–5 p)	AEPR Rezé (8)
194.	FC Grand Lieu (8)	4–0	Bouguenais Football (9)
195.	ES Notre-Dame-des-Landes (10)	0–3	JGE Sucé-sur-Erdre (9)
196.	RAC Cheminots Nantes (12)	1–1 (3–4 p)	FC La Montagne (9)
197.	Arche FC (10)	1–2	Nantes Saint-Pierre (8)
198.	FC Toutes Aides Nantes (11)	2–5	Saint Pierre de Retz (8)
199.	Étoile du Cens Nantes (12)	0–2	Don Bosco Football Nantes (10)
200.	Saint-Joseph de Porterie Nantes (11)	1–5	FC Bouaye (8)
201.	Nantes Sud 98 (10)	7–0	FC Bourgneuf-en-Retz (11)
202.	ES Haute Goulaine (10)	4–1	Espérance Saint-Yves Nantes (10)
203.	Couëron Chabossière FC (9)	1–1 (2–4 p)	UF Saint-Herblain (8)
204.	Nantes La Mellinet (9)	4–4 (4–2 p)	Nant'Est FC (10)
205.	AS Grandchamp Foot (10)	0–1	Sympho Foot Treillières (9)
206.	US Basse-Indre (12)	2–3	FC Stephanois (10)
207.	US Bugallière Orvault (11)	0–4	Saint-Herblain OC (9)
208.	FC Fay Bouvron (10)	1–1 (4–5 p)	FC Atlantique Morbihan (11)
209.	Union Brivet Campbon Chapelle-Launay (9)	2–2 (3–2 p)	UFC Erdre et Donneau (10)
210.	Étoile du Don Moisdon-Meilleraye (11)	2–1	AS Marsacais (9)
211.	FC Le Gâvre-La Chevallerais (11)	0–1	FC Trois Rivières (10)
212.	ÉS Jovéenne (11)	0–1	FC Oudon-Couffé (10)
213.	Héric FC (9)	0–0 (5–6 p)	Sainte-Reine-Crossac Football (9)
214.	ES Dresny-Plessé (9)	8–2	US Vay (11)
215.	Orvault RC (10)	2–7	FC Mouzeil-Teillé-Ligné (8)
216.	Jeunes d'Erbray (8)	1–1 (4–3 p)	JA Saint-Mars-du-Désert (9)
217.	Petit-Mars FC (10)	1–4	FC Guémené-Massérac (9)
218.	Nozay OS (10)	1–1 (5–4 p)	SC Avessac-Fégréac (9)
219.	FC Sud Sèvre et Maine (9)	6–2	FC Val de Moine (10)
220.	CAS Possosavennières (9)	1–3	US Beaufort-en-Vallée (8)
221.	FC Dollon-Thorigné (10)	0–2	SA Mamertins (8)

=== Second round ===
These matches were played on 4 September 2022.

Second round results: Pays de la Loire
Tie no	Home team (tier)	Score	Away team (tier)
1.	JS Parigné-l'Évêque (9)	2–4	VS Fertois (7)
2.	FC La Bazoge (8)	2–2 (5–3 p)	Ambrières Cigné Football (9)
3.	SC Tuffé (10)	1–4	EG Rouillon (9)
4.	US Alpes Mancelles (10)	0–1	US Pays de Juhel (8)
5.	ES Champfleur (10)	1–1 (4–2 p)	FC de l'Aisne (10)
6.	US Pré-en-Pail (9)	0–1	SA Mamertins (8)
7.	US Conlie Domfront (9)	0–2	FC Lassay (8)
8.	US Villaines-Malicorne (10)	1–0	AS Meslay-du-Maine (8)
9.	CA Loué (9)	1–4	Ernéenne Foot (7)
10.	JA Soulgé-sur-Ouette (8)	1–0	ASPTT Le Mans (9)
11.	Saint-Georges Trémentines FC (9)	1–1 (4–2 p)	Sèvremont FC (8)
12.	US Bequots-Lucquois (8)	1–5	AS Vieillevigne-La Planche (7)
13.	FC Mouchamps-Rochetrejoux (9)	3–0	Olympique Sal-Tour Vézins Coron (10)
14.	AS Chemazé (10)	1–1 (4–3 p)	SC Nord Atlantique (8)
15.	FC Longuenée-en-Anjou (9)	1–2	FC Château-Gontier (8)
16.	Athletic Laigné-Loigné (9)	0–2	Jeunes d'Erbray (8)
17.	US Nautique Spay (7)	3–2 (Note: Tie reversed from original draw.)	UF Allonnes-Brain-sur-Allonnes (9)
18.	USJA Saint-Martin-Aviré-Louvaine (10)	0–4	Auvers Poillé Brulon FC (7)
19.	EA Baugeois (9)	4–1	JS Allonnes (7)
20.	FC Pellouailles-Corze (9)	2–2 (4–3 p)	AS Le Mans Villaret (7)
21.	CS Lion d'Angers (9)	1–4	CS Changé (7)
22.	AC Longué (11)	0–3	AS La Chapelle-Saint-Aubin (7)
23.	FC Saint-Laurent Malvent (9)	1–3	Christophe-Séguinière (8)
24.	FC Layon (9)	4–0	FF Mortagne-sur-Sèvre (10)
25.	AS Saint-Hilaire-Vihiers-Saint-Paul (8)	2–1	FC Montaigu 85 (7)
26.	Saint-Georges Guyonnière FC (9)	1–2	EA La Tessoualle (8)
27.	US Toutlemonde Maulévrier (9)	4–1	FC Essartais (7)
28.	FC Pouëze-Saint-Clément-Brain (10)	0–2	FC Craonnais (8)
29.	US Méral-Cossé (8)	2–0	FC Guémené-Massérac (9)
30.	US Bazoges Beaurepaire (10)	3–2	Saint-André-Saint-Macaire FC (8)
31.	AS Maine (9)	2–1	LSG Les Brouzils (8)
32.	US Mesnard-Vendrennes (11)	2–1	ARC Tillières (11)
33.	USSA Montréverd (10)	2–1	FC Sud Sèvre et Maine (9)
34.	FC Saint-Saturnin-La Milesse (8)	1–1 (4–2 p)	US La Chapelle-Saint-Rémy (9)
35.	US Bazouges-Cré (9)	2–0	SS Noyen-sur-Sarthe (8)
36.	AS Le Bailleul Crosmières (10)	1–3	AS Ruaudin (8)
37.	US Saint-Mars-la-Brière (9)	1–1 (6–5 p)	US Glonnières (9)
38.	FC Val du Loir (9)	2–2 (8–7 p)	US Mansigné (8)
39.	La Patriote Bonnétable (8)	4–0	La Vigilante Mayet (9)
40.	US Bouloire (10)	1–3	AS Clermont-Créans (9)
41.	US Challes-Grand Lucé (10)	0–4	Écommoy FC (8)
42.	JS Ludoise (10)	1–3	ES Moncé (8)
43.	Gazélec Le Mans (10)	5–2	US Vibraysienne (8)
44.	Olympique Bécon-Villemoisan-Saint-Augustin (9)	1–1 (3–2 p)	US Laval (8)
45.	CF Châtelais-Nyoiseau-Bouillé-Grugé (10)	0–0 (4–5 p)	US Aubinoise (11)
46.	US Combrée-Bel-Air-Noyant (10)	0–0 (4–1 p)	FC Sud Ouest Mayennais (10)
47.	BoupèreMonProuant FC (10)	3–3 (3–4 p)	RC Cholet (7)
48.	FC Vallée du Graon (11)	0–3	FC Généraudière Roche Sud (9)
49.	Foot Espoir 85 (10)	0–1	Entente Cheffois-Antigny-Saint-Maurice (8)
50.	ES Rives de l'Yon (10)	5–3	Entente Sud Vendée (10)
51.	JA Nesmy (11)	2–2 (3–4 p)	FC La Génétouze (8)
52.	Andrezé-Jub-Jallais FC (8)	1–0	USJA Carquefou (7)
53.	Pomjeannais JA (9)	5–0	FC Vallons le Pin (10)
54.	FC Mouzeil-Teillé-Ligné (8)	0–4	Football Chalonnes-Chaudefonds (7)
55.	FC Bout' Loire-et-Evre (11)	0–3	US Varades (7)
56.	Olympique Liré-Drain (8)	0–3	FC Saint-Julien Divatte (7)
57.	FC Castelvarennais (11)	0–4	US Lucéene (8)
58.	US Thouaré (8)	2–2 (4–3 p)	AS Saint-Pierre-Montrevault (7)
59.	ES du Lac (10)	1–3	AFC Bouin-Bois-de-Céné-Châteauneuf (11)
60.	FC Retz (8)	2–4	FC Rezé (7)
61.	FC La Montagne (9)	0–6	Elan Sorinières Football (7)
62.	Sympho Foot Treillières (9)	1–6	ES Blain (7)
63.	CS Montoirin (9)	2–1	FC La Chapelle-des-Marais (7)
64.	ES Vertou (9)	1–1 (3–1 p)	AC Chapelain Foot (7)
65.	ES Dresny-Plessé (9)	2–2 (9–10 p)	ASC Saint-Médard-de-Doulon Nantes (7)
66.	FC Trois Rivières (10)	0–3	US La Baule-Le Pouliguen (7)
67.	Union Brivet Campbon Chapelle-Launay (9)	2–2 (4–3 p)	AC Saint-Brevin (7)
68.	ES Vallet (9)	0–3	Pornic Foot (7)
69.	Saint-Pierre Sportif Nieul-le-Dolent (9)	2–4	Luçon FC (7)
70.	US Bournezeau-Saint-Hilaire (9)	0–1	La France d'Aizenay (7)
71.	US Landeronde-Saint-Georges (11)	0–5	FC Jard-Avrillé (8)
72.	ES Grosbreuil-Girouard (9)	1–1 (5–6 p)	Mareuil SC (7)
73.	ES Longevillaise (10)	0–2	FC Achards (8)
74.	AS Le Bourgneuf-la-Forêt (9)	3–1	Louverné Sports (8)
75.	Larchamp-Montaudin FC (11)	1–1 (3–4 p)	AS Martigné-sur-Mayenne (8)
76.	Brecé Sports (11)	2–4	AS Andouillé (9)
77.	AS Contest-Saint Baudelle (8)	1–2	USC Pays de Montsurs (9)
78.	Saint-Pierre Mazières (8)	0–2	Élan de Gorges Foot (7)
79.	Don Bosco Football Nantes (10)	1–0	ES Haute Goulaine (10)
80.	FC Côteaux du Vignoble (9)	3–1	Olympique Chemillé-Melay (7)
81.	JFF Cholet (10)	0–3	ES Montilliers (8)
82.	AG Champigné-Querré (11)	0–5	Nort ACF (7)
83.	AS Chazé-Vern (11)	1–0	Les Touches FC (11)
84.	US Désertines (11)	2–2 (3–1 p)	US Le Genest (10)
85.	Voltigeurs Saint-Georges-Buttavent (10)	3–2	FC Landivy-Pontmain (10)
86.	FC Mesnilaurentais (10)	1–4	FC Entente du Vignoble (10)
87.	Saint Pierre de Retz (8)	2–1	SomloirYzernay CPF (9)
88.	ES Belleville-sur-Vie (10)	2–1	Maybéléger FC (10)
89.	Herbadilla Foot (11)	1–5	ES La Romagne-Roussay (10)
90.	ASL Montigné-le-Brillant (10)	0–10	AS Tiercé-Cheffes (8)
91.	US Saint-Berthevin (8)	0–2	ES Segré (7)
92.	FC Oudon-Couffé (10)	1–2	US Saint-Georges-sur-Loire (11)
93.	AS Sud Loire (10)	5–2	AS Saint-Gervais (11)
94.	Anjou Baconne FC (11)	3–2	US Forcé (9)
95.	ÉS Trélazé (10)	0–1	US Entrammes (8)
96.	US Chantrigné (9)	4–0	EB Commer (11)
97.	US Cantenay-Épinard (8)	1–1 (5–6 p)	US Dionysienne (9)
98.	FC Mouilleron-Thouarsais-Caillère (9)	0–0 (1–2 p)	FC Robretières La Roche-sur-Yon (9)
99.	FO Cope Chauché (9)	1–0	Pays de Chantonnay Foot (8)
100.	Hermitage Venansault (10)	2–0	US La Ferrière Dompierre (9)
101.	Coëx Olympique (10)	1–1 (4–3 p)	ES Saint-Denis-la-Chevasse (9)
102.	FC Saint-Julien-Vairé (10)	0–3	Écureils des Pays de Monts (8)
103.	Espoir du Marais Sallertaine (10)	0–3	ES Marsouins Brétignolles-Brem (8)
104.	FC Cantonal Sud Vendée (9)	1–1 (5–4 p)	FC Plaine et Bocage (8)
105.	Commequiers SF (9)	2–4	Mouilleron SF (7)
106.	ASO Montenay (9)	4–0	CS Saint-Pierre-des-Landes (10)
107.	USA Pouancé (8)	2–1	AS Bourny Laval (7)
108.	US Fougerolles-du-Plessis (9)	2–5	US Saint-Pierre Port-Brillet (8)
109.	FC Brière (9)	1–0	Saint-Aubin-Guérande Football (8)
110.	FC Stephanois (10)	1–3	Étoile du Don Moisdon-Meilleraye (11)
111.	AOS Pontchâteau (9)	5–3	FC Immaculée (10)
112.	Océane FC (11)	1–2	ES Maritime (9)
113.	Saint-Cyr Foot Herbignac (10)	1–1 (4–5 p)	FC Basse Loire (10)
114.	AS La Madeleine (9)	5–2	Nozay OS (10)
115.	UF Saint-Herblain (8)	10–1	Sainte-Reine-Crossac Football (9)
116.	ES Pornichet (8)	2–2 (4–3 p)	Donges FC (9)
117.	FC Atlantique Morbihan (11)	1–9	Nantes La Mellinet (9)
118.	Nantes Saint-Pierre (8)	0–4	ES Vigneux (7)
119.	Saint-Herblain OC (9)	1–4	FC Bouaye (8)
120.	JGE Sucé-sur-Erdre (9)	0–1	FC Grand Lieu (8)
121.	AS Salle-Aubry-Poitevinière (11)	0–4	Nantes Sud 98 (10)
122.	Union Saint-Leger-Saint-Germain-Champtocé Avenir (10)	0–1	Landreau-Loroux OSC (8)
123.	JS Layon (12)	1–2	Doutre SC (11)
124.	SC Angevin (10)	4–1	US Mazé (11)
125.	ASR Vernantes-Vernoil (10)	0–0 (5–4 p)	Angers Vaillante Foot (8)
126.	ES Morannes (10)	2–4	AS Bayard-Saumur (9)
127.	Croix Blanche Angers (8)	0–2	ES Bouchemaine (7)
128.	AS Avrillé (10)	0–2	Montreuil-Juigné Béné Football (7)
129.	RC Doué-la-Fontaine (8)	1–0	FE Trélazé (7)
130.	Saint-Barthélémy-d'Anjou Foot (10)	1–2	US Beaufort-en-Vallée (8)
131.	ES Layon (10)	0–4	Intrépide Angers Foot (8)

=== Third round ===
These matches were played on 10 and 11 September 2022.

Third round results: Pays de la Loire
Tie no	Home team (tier)	Score	Away team (tier)
1.	Football Chalonnes-Chaudefonds (7)	1–8	La Roche VF (5)
2.	FC Généraudière Roche Sud (9)	1–4	Vendée Fontenay Foot (5)
3.	ES Marsouins Brétignolles-Brem (8)	2–1	FC Rezé (7)
4.	RC Ancenis 44 (6)	1–1 (6–5 p)	Vendée Poiré-sur-Vie Football (5)
5.	ES Rives de l'Yon (10)	2–1	FC Achards (8)
6.	ES Montilliers (8)	1–1 (4–2 p)	La Flèche RC (6)
7.	ES Blain (7)	3–3 (4–3 p)	Saint-Sébastien FC (6)
8.	US Entrammes (8)	2–0	AS Le Bourgneuf-la-Forêt (9)
9.	Jeunes d'Erbray (8)	0–0 (4–2 p)	Union Brivet Campbon Chapelle-Launay (9)
10.	Elan Sorinières Football (7)	1–2	ASI Mûrs-Erigné (6)
11.	FC Basse Loire (10)	0–3	FC Olonne Château (6)
12.	US Villaines-Malicorne (10)	1–1 (2–3 p)	Ernéenne Foot (7)
13.	Anjou Baconne FC (11)	1–4	FC Pellouailles-Corze (9)
14.	RC Cholet (7)	2–0	La France d'Aizenay (7)
15.	US Combrée-Bel-Air-Noyant (10)	0–2	FC Craonnais (8)
16.	Étoile du Don Moisdon-Meilleraye (11)	1–9	USSA Vertou (5)
17.	FC Val du Loir (9)	1–2	US Saint-Mars-la-Brière (9)
18.	Landreau-Loroux OSC (8)	1–0	AOS Pontchâteau (9)
19.	US Beaufort-en-Vallée (8)	1–2	US Nautique Spay (7)
20.	FC Saint-Julien Divatte (7)	1–1 (3–2 p)	ESOF La Roche-sur-Yon (5)
21.	US Bazouges-Cré (9)	1–0	SC Beaucouzé (5)
22.	FC Robretières La Roche-sur-Yon (9)	1–1 (4–5 p)	ES Vertou (9)
23.	Saint Pierre de Retz (8)	1–4	FC Challans (5)
24.	FC Bouaye (8)	0–1	JSC Bellevue Nantes (6)
25.	Gazélec Le Mans (10)	2–2 (4–5 p)	La Patriote Bonnétable (8)
26.	US Aubinoise (11)	0–4	FC Brière (9)
27.	FC Château-Gontier (8)	3–0	Olympique Bécon-Villemoisan-Saint-Augustin (9)
28.	ASR Vernantes-Vernoil (10)	4–0	AS Chazé-Vern (11)
29.	AS Martigné-sur-Mayenne (8)	2–4	JS Coulaines (6)
30.	AS Ruaudin (8)	0–2	ES Segré (7)
31.	Coëx Olympique (10)	0–3	Mareuil SC (7)
32.	AS Tiercé-Cheffes (8)	1–2	Ancienne Château-Gontier (6)
33.	CS Montoirin (9)	0–2	Pomjeannais JA (9)
34.	FC La Génétouze (8)	1–2	AS Sautron (6)
35.	Mouilleron SF (7)	1–0	US Thouaré (8)
36.	SC Angevin (10)	4–0	AS Andouillé (9)
37.	ES Champfleur (10)	0–3	Stade Mayennais FC (6)
38.	AS Clermont-Créans (9)	2–2 (4–5 p)	US Varades (7)
39.	FC Côteaux du Vignoble (9)	2–1	Saint-Nazaire AF (5)
40.	AS Saint-Hilaire-Vihiers-Saint-Paul (8)	0–2	FC Mouchamps-Rochetrejoux (9)
41.	Don Bosco Football Nantes (10)	3–2	Hermitage Venansault (10)
42.	Écommoy FC (8)	1–3	NDC Angers (6)
43.	ES Pornichet (8)	0–0 (3–4 p)	USA Pouancé (8)
44.	US Saint-Georges-sur-Loire (11)	1–5	Élan de Gorges Foot (7)
45.	FC Lassay (8)	3–4	Auvers Poillé Brulon FC (7)
46.	FC La Bazoge (8)	0–2	US Chantrigné (9)
47.	US Désertines (11)	1–8	La Suze Roëzé FC (6)
48.	ES Vigneux (7)	0–2	Pouzauges Bocage FC (5)
49.	Saint-Georges Trémentines FC (9)	0–0 (3–5 p)	AC Basse-Goulaine (6)
50.	EG Rouillon (9)	2–1	Voltigeurs Saint-Georges-Buttavent (10)
51.	ES Moncé (8)	1–2	JA Soulgé-sur-Ouette (8)
52.	Entente Cheffois-Antigny-Saint-Maurice (8)	3–2	UF Saint-Herblain (8)
53.	Doutre SC (11)	1–5	US Saint-Pierre Port-Brillet (8)
54.	Nantes Sud 98 (10)	2–5	EA La Tessoualle (8)
55.	ES Maritime (9)	2–4	US La Baule-Le Pouliguen (7)
56.	ES Belleville-sur-Vie (10)	0–3	Luçon FC (7)
57.	ES La Romagne-Roussay (10)	1–4	TVEC Les Sables-d'Olonne (6)
58.	SA Mamertins (8)	1–1 (2–4 p)	AS Mulsanne-Teloché (6)
59.	AS Maine (9)	3–2	FO Cope Chauché (9)
60.	US Toutlemonde Maulévrier (9)	1–0	ES Aubance (6)
61.	ES Bouchemaine (7)	4–1	Andrezé-Jub-Jallais FC (8)
62.	USSA Montréverd (10)	0–3	FC Jard-Avrillé (8)
63.	Écureils des Pays de Monts (8)	2–0	FC Cantonal Sud Vendée (9)
64.	VS Fertois (7)	1–4	Sablé FC (5)
65.	AS Chemazé (10)	1–4	Nort ACF (7)
66.	Christophe-Séguinière (8)	0–2	Pornic Foot (7)
67.	FC Layon (9)	0–3	US Philbertine Football (5)
68.	FC Grand Lieu (8)	0–4	AS La Châtaigneraie (6)
69.	AFC Bouin-Bois-de-Céné-Châteauneuf (11)	1–2	AS La Madeleine (9)
70.	Montreuil-Juigné Béné Football (7)	3–2	ES Bonchamp (6)
71.	US Bazoges Beaurepaire (10)	1–1 (5–3 p)	US Lucéene (8)
72.	Intrépide Angers Foot (8)	0–3	Orvault SF (6)
73.	Nantes La Mellinet (9)	1–2	AS Vieillevigne-La Planche (7)
74.	US Dionysienne (9)	0–3	EA Baugeois (9)
75.	US Mesnard-Vendrennes (11)	2–5	AS Sud Loire (10)
76.	AS Bayard-Saumur (9)	2–4	FC Saint-Saturnin-La Milesse (8)
77.	US Pays de Juhel (8)	1–1 (7–8 p)	US Méral-Cossé (8)
78.	ASO Montenay (9)	2–1	AS La Chapelle-Saint-Aubin (7)
79.	FC Entente du Vignoble (10)	1–2	RC Doué-la-Fontaine (8)
80.	USC Pays de Montsurs (9)	3–0	CS Changé (7)
81.	ASC Saint-Médard-de-Doulon Nantes (7)	0–1	US Changé (5)

=== Fourth round ===
These matches were played on 24 and 24 September 2022.

Fourth round results: Pays de la Loire
Tie no	Home team (tier)	Score	Away team (tier)
1.	EA Baugeois (9)	1–2	ASI Mûrs-Erigné (6)
2.	US Chantrigné (9)	0–4	La Roche VF (5)
3.	RC Doué-la-Fontaine (8)	2–4	FC Jard-Avrillé (8)
4.	US La Baule-Le Pouliguen (7)	2–0	US Changé (5)
5.	US Saint-Mars-la-Brière (9)	0–7	ES Blain (7)
6.	USA Pouancé (8)	0–6	Les Herbiers VF (4)
7.	Don Bosco Football Nantes (10)	0–2	Vendée Fontenay Foot (5)
8.	FC Brière (9)	3–1	ES Bouchemaine (7)
9.	Orvault SF (6)	2–0	La Suze Roëzé FC (6)
10.	AS Maine (9)	0–2	Pornic Foot (7)
11.	Luçon FC (7)	1–3	Entente Cheffois-Antigny-Saint-Maurice (8)
12.	FC Côteaux du Vignoble (9)	5–1	ES Rives de l'Yon (10)
13.	Écureils des Pays de Monts (8)	0–6	Ancienne Château-Gontier (6)
14.	JS Coulaines (6)	5–1	Ernéenne Foot (7)
15.	AS La Châtaigneraie (6)	3–1	TVEC Les Sables-d'Olonne (6)
16.	ES Montilliers (8)	0–1	AC Basse-Goulaine (6)
17.	Pomjeannais JA (9)	0–0 (4–5 p)	AS Sautron (6)
18.	EA La Tessoualle (8)	2–1	RC Ancenis 44 (6)
19.	US Varades (7)	2–2 (4–2 p)	RC Cholet (7)
20.	US Bazoges Beaurepaire (10)	0–1	US Méral-Cossé (8)
21.	FC Mouchamps-Rochetrejoux (9)	4–2	FC Château-Gontier (8)
22.	Nort ACF (7)	0–5	Sablé FC (5)
23.	ES Marsouins Brétignolles-Brem (8)	1–4	USSA Vertou (5)
24.	ES Vertou (9)	1–1 (4–2 p)	US Bazouges-Cré (9)
25.	EG Rouillon (9)	0–2	Voltigeurs de Châteaubriant (4)
26.	FC Saint-Julien Divatte (7)	0–0 (4–2 p)	US Philbertine Football (5)
27.	US Saint-Pierre Port-Brillet (8)	1–3	Mareuil SC (7)
28.	ASR Vernantes-Vernoil (10)	0–3	Élan de Gorges Foot (7)
29.	Pouzauges Bocage FC (5)	0–1	Olympique Saumur FC (4)
30.	AS Sud Loire (10)	2–0	Montreuil-Juigné Béné Football (7)
31.	Stade Mayennais FC (6)	3–1	Auvers Poillé Brulon FC (7)
32.	La Patriote Bonnétable (8)	0–2	JSC Bellevue Nantes (6)
33.	FC Saint-Saturnin-La Milesse (8)	1–2	FC Olonne Château (6)
34.	SC Angevin (10)	3–2	AS Mulsanne-Teloché (6)
35.	FC Pellouailles-Corze (9)	0–2	NDC Angers (6)
36.	US Toutlemonde Maulévrier (9)	0–4	US Entrammes (8)
37.	ASO Montenay (9)	2–1	USC Pays de Montsurs (9)
38.	Mouilleron SF (7)	2–0	Landreau-Loroux OSC (8)
39.	ES Segré (7)	2–1	JA Soulgé-sur-Ouette (8)
40.	FC Craonnais (8)	0–8	FC Challans (5)
41.	AS La Madeleine (9)	1–2	US Nautique Spay (7)
42.	AS Vieillevigne-La Planche (7)	3–1	Jeunes d'Erbray (8)

=== Fifth round ===
These matches were played on 8 and 9 October 2022.

Fifth round results: Pays de la Loire
Tie no	Home team (tier)	Score	Away team (tier)
1.	AS Sud Loire (10)	0–2	AS La Châtaigneraie (6)
2.	Élan de Gorges Foot (7)	2–0	La Roche VF (5)
3.	FC Brière (9)	1–3	Mareuil SC (7)
4.	JS Coulaines (6)	1–7	SO Cholet (3)
5.	USSA Vertou (5)	0–1	Les Herbiers VF (4)
6.	FC Côteaux du Vignoble (9)	0–0 (5–4 p)	Vendée Fontenay Foot (5)
7.	US Varades (7)	0–1	Orvault SF (6)
8.	FC Mouchamps-Rochetrejoux (9)	2–3	Pornic Foot (7)
9.	FC Saint-Julien Divatte (7)	1–1 (5–4 p)	US La Baule-Le Pouliguen (7)
10.	US Méral-Cossé (8)	0–2	FC Olonne Château (6)
11.	EA La Tessoualle (8)	0–2	NDC Angers (6)
12.	AS Sautron (6)	2–0	Mouilleron SF (7)
13.	ES Vertou (9)	0–2	Voltigeurs de Châteaubriant (4)
14.	Sablé FC (5)	3–2	FC Challans (5)
15.	FC Jard-Avrillé (8)	1–1 (4–5 p)	ES Blain (7)
16.	AC Basse-Goulaine (6)	2–1	Stade Mayennais FC (6)
17.	Ancienne Château-Gontier (6)	0–0 (4–5 p)	Olympique Saumur FC (4)
18.	Entente Cheffois-Antigny-Saint-Maurice (8)	0–1	AS Vieillevigne-La Planche (7)
19.	ASI Mûrs-Erigné (6)	2–4	Le Mans FC (3)
20.	ASO Montenay (9)	4–2	SC Angevin (10)
21.	US Nautique Spay (7)	4–1	US Entrammes (8)
22.	JSC Bellevue Nantes (6)	2–1	ES Segré (7)

=== Sixth round ===
These matches were played on 16 October 2022.

Sixth round results: Pays de la Loire
Tie no	Home team (tier)	Score	Away team (tier)
1.	ES Blain (7)	1–3	AS La Châtaigneraie (6)
2.	US Nautique Spay (7)	1–1 (5–6 p)	AC Basse-Goulaine (6)
3.	Sablé FC (5)	4–0	AS Sautron (6)
4.	AS Vieillevigne-La Planche (7)	0–1	Voltigeurs de Châteaubriant (4)
5.	ASO Montenay (9)	0–2	Orvault SF (6)
6.	Mareuil SC (7)	2–0	FC Saint-Julien Divatte (7)
7.	FC Olonne Château (6)	1–3	SO Cholet (3)
8.	NDC Angers (6)	2–1	Élan de Gorges Foot (7)
9.	Pornic Foot (7)	1–1 (3–4 p)	JSC Bellevue Nantes (6)
10.	FC Côteaux du Vignoble (9)	1–4	Les Herbiers VF (4)
11.	Olympique Saumur FC (4)	0–4	Le Mans FC (3)
