= TVEC Les Sables-d'Olonne =

French football club

Les Sables-d'Olonne
- Full name: Tigres Vendéens Etoile Chaumoise 85; Les Sables-d'Olonne
- Founded: 1997
- Ground: Stade de La Roudilière
- Capacity: 1,100
- Chairman: Bernard Chabirand
- League: CFA Group C
- 2006-07: CFA 2 Group D, 3rd (promoted)
Home colours	Away colours

Tigres Vendéens Etoile Chaumoise 85 Les Sables-d'Olonne was a French association football team founded in 1997 following the merging of Vendée tigers and the Chaumoise sports star. They were based in Les Sables-d'Olonne, Vendée, France.
