= 2014–15 FC Lorient season =

Lorient
2014–15 season
- Chairman: Loïc Fery
- Manager: Sylvain Ripoll
- Stadium: Stade du Moustoir
- Ligue 1: 16th
- Coupe de France: Round of 64 vs. US Avranches
- Coupe de la Ligue: Round of 16 vs. Saint-Étienne
- Top goalscorer: Jordan Ayew (12)
- Highest home attendance: 16,143 vs. Bordeaux (2 May 2015)
- Lowest home attendance: 9,015 vs. Saint-Étienne (17 December 2014)
- Average home league attendance: 13,645
Home colours	Away colours	Third colours

The 2014–15 FC Lorient season is the 89th professional season of the club since its creation in 1926.

== Players ==
=== First team squad ===
French teams are limited to four players without EU citizenship. Hence, the squad list includes only the principal nationality of each player; several non-European players on the squad have dual citizenship with an EU country. Also, players from the ACP countries—countries in Africa, the Caribbean, and the Pacific that are signatories to the Cotonou Agreement—are not counted against non-EU quotas due to the Kolpak ruling.

Note: Flags indicate national team as defined under FIFA eligibility rules; some limited exceptions apply. Players may hold more than one non-FIFA nationality.

No.	Pos.	Nation	Player
2	DF	CIV	Lamine Koné
3	DF	POR	Pedrinho
4	DF	FRA	Vincent Le Goff
5	MF	ALG	Mehdi Mostefa
6	DF	FRA	François Bellugou
7	MF	GUI	Sadio Diallo (on loan from Rennes)
8	MF	FRA	Yann Jouffre
9	FW	GHA	Jordan Ayew
10	MF	FRA	Mathieu Coutadeur
11	MF	GAB	Didier Ibrahim N'Dong
12	MF	FRA	Pierre Lavenant
13	MF	FRA	Rafidine Abdullah
14	DF	POR	Raphaël Guerreiro
15	FW	FRA	Fabien Robert
16	GK	FRA	Fabien Audard

No.	Pos.	Nation	Player
17	MF	ALG	Walid Mesloub
19	MF	FRA	Romain Philippoteaux
22	FW	FRA	Benjamin Jeannot
23	MF	FRA	Mathias Autret
24	DF	NCL	Wesley Lautoa
25	DF	SEN	Lamine Gassama
26	DF	FRA	Yoann Wachter
28	MF	FRA	Maxime Barthelme
29	DF	CIV	Cheikh Touré
30	GK	FRA	Florent Chaigneau
31	MF	FRA	Valentin Lavigne
39	FW	BEL	Gianni Bruno (on loan from Evian TG)
40	GK	FRA	Benjamin Lecomte
—	MF	FRA	Denis Bouanga

== Competitions ==
=== Ligue 1 ===
==== League table ====
Pos	Team	Pld	W	D	L	GF	GA	GD	Pts	Qualification or relegation
14	Nantes	38	11	12	15	29	40	−11	45	
15	Reims	38	12	8	18	47	66	−19	44	
16	Lorient	38	12	7	19	44	50	−6	43	
17	Toulouse	38	12	6	20	43	64	−21	42	
18	Evian (R)	38	11	4	23	41	62	−21	37	Relegation to Ligue 2

Source: Ligue 1
Rules for classification: 1) points; 2) goal difference; 3) number of goals scored
(R) Relegated

==== Results summary ====
Overall								Home						Away					
Pld	W	D	L	GF	GA	GD	Pts	W	D	L	GF	GA	GD	W	D	L	GF	GA	GD
38	12	7	19	44	50	−6	43	6	5	8	17	17	0	6	2	11	27	33	−6

Last updated: 11 June 2015.
Source: Competitive matches

==== Results by round ====
Round	1	2	3	4	5	6	7	8	9	10	11	12	13	14	15	16	17	18	19	20	21	22	23	24	25	26	27	28	29	30	31	32	33	34	35	36	37	38
Ground	A	H	A	H	A	H	A	H	A	H	A	H	A	H	A	H	A	H	H	A	H	A	H	A	H	A	A	A	H	A	H	A	H	A	H	A	A	H
Result	W	D	L	W	L	L	L	L	W	L	L	L	L	W	W	D	L	W	L	L	W	L	D	W	D	L	W	L	W	L	L	D	L	W	D	W	D	L
Position	5	6	12	6	8	11	17	17	14	15	17	18	20	17	15	16	17	14	15	16	14	15	17	16	16	17	17	17	15	17	17	16	18	16	15	14	16	16

Source: Ligue1
A = Away; H = Home; W = Win; D = Draw; L = Loss
Notes: Match 26 versus Evian was postponed until 4 March 2015 and instead should appear between matches 27 & 28.

==== Matches ====
Win Draw Loss

10 August 2014 1	Monaco	1–2	Lorient	Monaco
21:00 CEST (UTC+02:00)	Abdennour (yellow card) 9'; Dirar (yellow card) 40'; Berbatov (yellow card) 48'; Carvalho (yellow card) 53' (yellow-red card) 68'; Falcao 78' (pen.)	Report	Aboubakar 9', (yellow card) 65'; Coutadeur (yellow card) 15'; Lavigne 87'	Stadium: Stade Louis II; Attendance: 13,960; Referee: Ruddy Buquet

16 August 2014 2	Lorient	0–0	Nice	Lorient
20:00 CEST (UTC+02:00)	Ayew (yellow card) 22'	Report	Honorat (yellow card) 35'; Hassen (yellow card) 90+1'	Stadium: Stade du Moustoir; Attendance: 13,735; Referee: Saïd Ennjimi

23 August 2014 3	Lille	2–0	Lorient	Villeneuve-d'Ascq
20:00 CEST	Delaplace 58'; Kjær 74'	Report	Abdullah (yellow card) 29'	Stadium: Stade Pierre-Mauroy; Attendance: 34,860; Referee: Tony Chapron

30 August 2014 4	Lorient	4–0	Guingamp	Lorient
20:00 CEST (UTC+02:00)	Ayew (yellow card) 34', (goal) 82'; Jeannot 58'; Abdullah (yellow card) 61'; Lavigne 80', 90+3'	Report	Diallo (yellow card) 66'	Stadium: Stade du Moustoir; Attendance: 13,025; Referee: Sébastien Desiage

13 September 2014 5	Montpellier	1–0	Lorient	Montpellier
20:00 CEST (UTC+02:00)	Koné 44' (o.g.); Martin (yellow card) 77'	Report	Lautoa (yellow card) 36'; Abdullah (yellow card) 80'	Stadium: Stade de la Mosson; Attendance: 12,106; Referee: Fredy Fautrel

20 September 2014 6	Lorient	0–1	Reims	Lorient
20:00 CEST (UTC+02:00)	Sunu (yellow card) 37'	Report	Moukandjo 72'; Placide (yellow card) 86'; Courtet (yellow card) 90+2'	Stadium: Stade du Moustoir; Attendance: 12,003; Referee: Benoît Millot

24 September 2014 7	Lyon	4–0	Lorient	Lyon
19:00 CEST (UTC+02:00)	Lacazette 5'; Fekir 39', 68'; N'Jie 50'	Report	Lautoa (yellow card) 62'	Stadium: Stade de Gerland; Attendance: 32,523; Referee: Sébastien Moreira

27 September 2014 8	Lorient	0–2	Evian	Lorient
20:00 CEST (UTC+02:00)	Koné (yellow card) 58'; Mesloub (red card) 90+2'	Report	Koné 2'; Ninković (yellow card) 20'; Sougou (yellow card) 45'; Barbosa 79'	Stadium: Stade du Moustoir; Attendance: 10,391; Referee: Mikael Lesage

4 October 2014 9	Bastia	0–2	Lorient	Bastia
20:00 CEST (UTC+02:00)	Squilllaci (yellow card) 55'	Report	Peybernes 48' (o.g.); Ayew (yellow card) 55'; Sunu 62', (yellow card) 64'	Stadium: Stade Armand Cesari; Attendance: 11,530; Referee: Stéphane Lannoy

18 October 2014 10	Lorient	0–1	Saint-Étienne	Lorient
17:00 CEST (UTC+02:00)	Bellugou (yellow card) 22'; Mostefa (yellow card) 49'	Report	Theophile-Catherine (yellow card) 41'; Hamouma (yellow card) 53'; Lemoine 86'	Stadium: Stade du Moustoir; Attendance: 14,069; Referee: Ruddy Buquet

25 October 2014 11	Caen	2–1	Lorient	Caen
20:00 CEST (UTC+02:00)	Nangis 3'; Da Silva (yellow card) 24'; Duhamel 53' (pen.)	Report	Ayew 24' (pen.); Guerreiro (yellow card) 26'; Mostefa (yellow card) 28'; Gassama (yellow card) 84'	Stadium: Stade Michel d'Ornano; Attendance: 15,963; Referee: Frank Schneider

1 November 2014 12	Lorient	1–2	Paris Saint-Germain	Lorient
17:00 CET (UTC+01:00)	Abdullah (yellow card) 29'; Guerreiro 42'; Jouffre (yellow card) 73'	Report	Cavani 60'; Bahebeck 68'	Stadium: Stade du Moustoir; Attendance: 15,652; Referee: Olivier Thual

7 November 2014 13	Rennes	1–0	Lorient	Rennes
20:30 CET (UTC+01:00)	Mexer (yellow card) 52'; Pedro Henrique (yellow card) 70', (goal) 89'; Armand (yellow card) 83'	Report	Lautoa (yellow card) 47'; Gassama (yellow card) 67'; Koné (yellow card) 69'	Stadium: Stade de la Route de Lorient; Attendance: 18,390; Referee: Wilfried Bien

22 November 2014 14	Lorient	1–0	Lens	Lorient
20:00 CET (UTC+01:00)	Guerreiro 21'; Ayew (yellow card) 75'	Report	Landre (red card) 15'	Stadium: Stade du Moustoir; Attendance: 13,198; Referee: Amaury Delerue

29 November 2014 15	Toulouse	2–3	Lorient	Toulouse
20:00 CET (UTC+01:00)	Doumbia 23'; Pešić (yellow card) 45', (goal) 70'	Report	Guerreiro 55'; Jeannot 57'; Ayew 60' (pen.)	Stadium: Stadium Municipal; Attendance: 20,550; Referee: Alexandre Castro

2 December 2014 16	Lorient	1–1	Marseille	Lorient
19:00 CET (UTC+01:00)	Ayew 37' (pen.)	Report	Payet 32'; Mandanda (yellow card) 36'	Stadium: Stade du Moustoir; Attendance: 16,011; Referee: Benoît Millot

6 December 2014 17	Bordeaux	3–2	Lorient	Bordeaux
20:00 CET (UTC+01:00)	Khazri 43'; Diabaté 64', 66'	Report	Jeannot 31'; Le Goff 50'; Ayew (yellow card) 71'	Stadium: Stade Chaban-Delmas; Attendance: 15,724; Referee: Philippe Kalt

13 December 2014 18	Lorient	3–1	Metz	Lorient
20:00 CET (UTC+01:00)	Ayew 13'; Guerreiro 37'; Jeannot 45'; Koné (yellow card) 58'	Report	Malouda (yellow card) 42'; Ngbakoto 46'	Stadium: Stade du Moustoir; Attendance: 11,507; Referee: Mikael Lesage

20 December 2014 19	Lorient	1–2	Nantes	Lorient
20:00 CET (UTC+01:00)	Ayew 73'	Report	Bammou 44'; Audel 78'	Stadium: Stade du Moustoir; Attendance: 15,091; Referee: Frank Schneider

10 January 2015 20	Nice	3–1	Lorient	Nice
20:00 CET (UTC+01:00)	Bodmer (yellow card) 5'; Bauthéac 30' (pen.); Bosetti 60'; Carlos Eduardo 67'	Report	Jeannot 6'; Mesloub (yellow card) 62'	Stadium: Allianz Riviera; Attendance: 16,141; Referee: Wilfried Bien

17 January 2015 21	Lorient	1–0	Lille	Lorient
20:00 CET (UTC+01:00)	Pedrinho (yellow card) 38'; Guerreiro 59'; Mostefa (yellow card) 84'	Report	Koubemba (yellow card) 43'	Stadium: Stade du Moustoir; Attendance: 12,026; Referee: Phillippe Kalt

24 January 2015 22	Guingamp	3–2	Lorient	Guingamp
20:00 CET (UTC+01:00)	Beauvue 19', 76' (pen.); Diallo (yellow card) 28'; Sankharé (yellow card) 28' (yellow-red card) 80'; Pied (yellow card) 47'; Mandanne 69'	Report	Lautoa (yellow card) 55'; Jeannot 72' (pen.); Lévêque 90+2' (o.g.)	Stadium: Stade du Roudourou; Attendance: 13,764; Referee: Tony Chapron

31 January 2015 23	Lorient	0–0	Montpellier	Lorient
20:00 CET (UTC+01:00)	Bellugou (yellow card) 66'; Lavigne (yellow card) 80'	Report	Deplagne (yellow card) 81'	Stadium: Stade du Moustoir; Attendance: 11,549; Referee: Olivier Thual

7 February 2015 24	Reims	1–3	Lorient	Reims
20:00 CET (UTC+01:00)	Moukandjo 42'; Signorino (yellow card) 73'	Report	Lecomte (yellow card) 42'; Gassama 50'; Guerreiro 63'; Jeannot 85'	Stadium: Stade Auguste Delaune; Attendance: 11,757; Referee: Benoît Bastien

14 February 2015 25	Lorient	1–1	Lyon	Lorient
21:00 CET (UTC+01:00)	Ayew 50'	Report	Gonalons (yellow card) 45'; Bedimo (yellow card) 50'; N'Jie 78'; Jallet (yellow card) 86'; Koné (yellow card) 90+2'	Stadium: Stade du Moustoir; Attendance: 14,354; Referee: Stéphane Lannoy

28 February 2015 27	Lorient	2–0	Bastia	Lorient
20:00 CET (UTC+01:00)	Bellugou 16'; Abdullah (yellow card) 81'; Bruno 85'	Report	Gillet (yellow card) 42'	Stadium: Stade du Moustoir; Attendance: 13,619; Referee: Wilfried Bien

4 March 2015 26	Evian	1–0	Lorient	Annecy
19:00 CET (UTC+01:00)	Cambon (yellow card) 19'; N'Sikulu 25'; Barbosa (yellow card) 59'; Koné (yellow card) 89'	Report	Bellugou (yellow card) 66'; Gassama (yellow card) 89'; Ayew (yellow card) 90+1'	Stadium: Parc des Sports; Attendance: 7,635; Referee: Frank Schneider

8 March 2015 28	Saint-Étienne	2–0	Lorient	Saint-Étienne
14:00 CET (UTC+01:00)	Gradel (yellow card) 55', (goal) 90'; Mollo 74'; Clément (yellow card) 85'; Karamoko (yellow card) 87'	Report	N'Dong (yellow card) 59' (yellow-red card) 67'	Stadium: Stade Geoffroy-Guichard; Attendance: 30,921; Referee: Mickaël Lesage

14 March 2015 29	Lorient	2–1	Caen	Lorient
20:00 CET (UTC+01:00)	Guerreiro 43'; Ayew 60'	Report	Da Silva (red card) 17'; Bazile 41'; Felipe Saad (yellow card) 67'	Stadium: Stade du Moustoir; Attendance: 12,877; Referee: Philippe Kalt

20 March 2015 30	Paris Saint-Germain	3–1	Lorient	Paris
20:30 CET (UTC+01:00)	Ibrahimović 4' (pen.), 82' (pen.), 90+2'; Motta (yellow card) 57'; Verratti (yellow card) 74'	Report	Lecomte (yellow card) 3'; Ayew 67'; Koné (yellow card) 74'; Gassama (yellow card) 76'	Stadium: Parc des Princes; Attendance: 45,705; Referee: Tony Chapron

4 April 2015 31	Lorient	0–3	Rennes	Lorient
20:00 CEST (UTC+02:00)	Le Goff (yellow card) 45'	Report	Mexer 17'; Fernandes (yellow card) 41'; Armand 43'; Doucouré 50'	Stadium: Stade du Moustoir; Attendance: 14,718; Referee: Sébastien Desiage

12 April 2015 32	Lens	0–0	Lorient	Amiens
17:00 CEST (UTC+02:00)	Madiani (yellow card) 59'; Valdivia (yellow card) 76'; Cyprien (yellow card) 90+4'	Report	Mostefa (yellow card) 69'	Stadium: Stade de la Licorne; Attendance: 7,468; Referee: Sébastien Moreira

18 April 2015 33	Lorient	0–1	Toulouse	Lorient
20:00 CEST (UTC+02:00)	Le Goff (yellow card) 27'; Bellugou (yellow card) 74'; Gassama (yellow card) 78'	Report	Braithwaite 28'; Moubandje (red card) 85'	Stadium: Stade du Moustoir; Attendance: 13,511; Referee: Alexandre Castro

25 April 2015 34	Marseille	3–5	Lorient	Marseille
20:30 CEST (UTC+02:00)	Romao (yellow card) 41'; A. Ayew 59'; Morel 67'; Batshuayi 76'	Report	J. Ayew 9', 84', (yellow card) 87'; Bellugou 14'; N'Dong (yellow card) 51'; Mostefa (yellow card) 62'; Philippoteaux 68'; Abdullah (yellow card) 75'; Gassama (yellow card) 90+3'	Stadium: Stade Vélodrome; Attendance: 55,180; Referee: Saïd Ennjimi

2 May 2015 35	Lorient	0–0	Bordeaux	Lorient
20:00 CEST (UTC+02:00)		Report	Saivet (yellow card) 73'	Stadium: Stade du Moustoir; Attendance: 16,143; Referee: Fredy Fautrel

9 May 2015 36	Metz	0–4	Lorient	Metz
20:00 CEST (UTC+02:00)	Maïga (yellow card) 60'; Ngbakoto (yellow card) 90+3'	Report	Mostefa 12'; Philippoteaux 34'; Koné 55'; Ayew 84'; Lecomte (yellow card) 90+3'	Stadium: Stade Saint-Symphorien; Attendance: 16,986; Referee: Wilfried Bien

16 May 2015 37	Nantes	1–1	Lorient	Nantes
21:00 CEST (UTC+02:00)	Audel 6'; Vizcarrondo (yellow card) 63'; Djilobodji (yellow card) 75'	Report	Djilobodji 4' (o.g.); N'Dong (yellow card) 41'	Stadium: Stade de la Beaujoire; Attendance: 28,321; Referee: Olivier Thual

23 May 2015 38	Lorient	0–1	Monaco	Lorient
21:00 CEST (UTC+02:00)	N'Dong (yellow card) 23'; Ayew (yellow card) 71'	Report	Carrasco 20', (yellow card) 61'; Moutinho (yellow card) 61'; Subašić (yellow card) 90+1'	Stadium: Stade du Moustoir; Attendance: 15,844; Referee: Tony Chapron

=== Coupe de la Ligue ===
28 October 2014 Round of 32	Evian	1–2	Lorient	Annecy
20:00 CEST (UTC+02:00)	Wass 7'; Mensah (yellow card) 58' (yellow-red card) 90'; Ninković (yellow card) 65'	Report	Lavigne 15'; Ayew 73'	Stadium: Parc des Sports; Attendance: 4,526; Referee: Clément Turpin

17 December 2014 Round of 16	Lorient	0–1	Saint-Étienne	Lorient
21:00 CET (UTC+01:00)		Report	Hamouma 48'; Theophile-Catherine (yellow card) 85'	Stadium: Stade du Moustoir; Attendance: 9,015; Referee: Benoît Bastien

=== Coupe de France ===
3 January 2015 Round of 64	Avranches	1–0	Lorient	Avranches
18:00 CET (UTC+01:00)	Barreto (yellow card) 43'; Diongue 60'; Keïta (red card) 84'	Report 1, 2	Diallo (yellow card) 71'	Stadium: Stade René Fenouillère; Attendance: 5,000; Referee: Stéphane Jochem
