= 2015–16 FC Lorient season =

Lorient
2015–16 season
- Manager: Sylvain Ripoll
- Stadium: Stade du Moustoir
- Ligue 1: 15th
- Coupe de France: Semi-final
- Coupe de la Ligue: Quarter-final
- Top goalscorer: League: Benjamin Moukandjo (12); All: Benjamin Jeannot (13)
- Highest home attendance: 15,599 vs Marseille (12 March 2016)
- Lowest home attendance: 3,056 vs Tours (3 January 2016)
Home colours	Away colours	Third colours

The 2015–16 FC Lorient season was the 90th professional season of the club since its creation in 1926.

== Players ==
French teams are limited to four players without EU citizenship. Hence, the squad list includes only the principal nationality of each player; several non-European players on the squad have dual citizenship with an EU country. Also, players from the ACP countries—countries in Africa, the Caribbean, and the Pacific that are signatories to the Cotonou Agreement—are not counted against non-EU quotas due to the Kolpak ruling.

=== Current squad ===
Updated 1 February 2016.

Note: Flags indicate national team as defined under FIFA eligibility rules; some limited exceptions apply. Players may hold more than one non-FIFA nationality.

No.	Pos.	Nation	Player
3	DF	GAB	Yrondu Musavu-King (on loan from Granada)
4	DF	FRA	Vincent Le Goff
5	DF	SEN	Zargo Touré
6	DF	FRA	François Bellugou
7	MF	GAB	Didier Ndong
8	MF	FRA	Yann Jouffre
9	FW	GHA	Majeed Waris
11	FW	FRA	Marvin Gakpa
12	FW	CMR	Benjamin Moukandjo
13	MF	COM	Rafidine Abdullah
14	DF	POR	Raphaël Guerreiro
15	MF	COD	Rémi Mulumba
16	GK	SEN	Ibrahima Sy
17	MF	ALG	Walid Mesloub

No.	Pos.	Nation	Player
18	DF	FRA	Hamadou Karamoko
19	MF	FRA	Romain Philippoteaux
21	MF	BFA	Alain Traoré
22	FW	FRA	Benjamin Jeannot
23	MF	CIV	Moryké Fofana
24	DF	NCL	Wesley Lautoa
25	DF	SEN	Lamine Gassama
26	DF	FRA	Lindsay Rose (on loan from Lyon)
27	FW	FRA	Jimmy Cabot
28	MF	FRA	Maxime Barthelme
29	DF	FRA	Pape Paye
30	GK	FRA	Florent Chaigneau
40	GK	FRA	Benjamin Lecomte

=== Out on loan ===
Note: Flags indicate national team as defined under FIFA eligibility rules; some limited exceptions apply. Players may hold more than one non-FIFA nationality.

No.	Pos.	Nation	Player
12	MF	FRA	Pierre Lavenant (on loan to Sedan)
20	MF	FRA	Denis Bouanga (on loan to Strasbourg)
26	DF	FRA	Yoann Wachter (on loan to Sedan)

No.	Pos.	Nation	Player
—	DF	FRA	Maxence Derrien (on loan to Avranches)
31	FW	FRA	Valentin Lavigne (on loan to Laval)

== Transfers ==
=== Transfers in ===
Date	Pos.	Player	Age	Moved from	Fee	Notes
1 July 2015	DF	(France) Pape Paye	25	(France) Dijon	Free	
22 July 2015	FW	(Ivory Coast) Moryké Fofana	23	(Norway) Lillestrøm	Undisclosed	
5 August 2015	FW	(Cameroon) Benjamin Moukandjo	26	(France) Reims	Undisclosed	
6 August 2015	FW	(Ghana) Majeed Waris	23	(Turkey) Trabzonspor	£2,820,000	
31 August 2015	DF	(Senegal) Zargo Touré	25	(France) Le Havre	Undisclosed	
29 January 2016	FW	(France) Jimmy Cabot	21	(France) Troyes	€1,800,000	

=== Loans in ===
Date	Pos.	Player	Age	Loaned from	Return date	Notes
28 January 2016	DF	(France) Lindsay Rose	23	(France) Lyon	30 June 2016	
28 January 2016	DF	(Gabon) Yrondu Musavu-King	24	(Spain) Granada	30 June 2016	

=== Transfers out ===
Date	Pos.	Player	Age	Moved to	Fee	Notes
1 July 2015	GK	(France) Fabien Audard	37	Retired		
1 July 2015	DF	(Ivory Coast) Cheikh Touré	22	Unattached	Released	
1 July 2015	MF	(France) Mathieu Coutadeur	29	(Cyprus) AEL Limassol	Free	
1 July 2015	DF	(Portugal) Pedrinho	30	(Portugal) Rio Ave	Free	
27 July 2015	FW	(Ghana) Jordan Ayew	23	(England) Aston Villa	£8,200,000	
28 July 2015	MF	(France) Mathias Autret	24	(France) Lens	Undisclosed	
30 July 2015	MF	(France) Fabien Robert	26	(England) Swindon Town	Free	
27 August 2015	MF	(Algeria) Mehdi Mostefa	31	(France) Bastia	Undisclosed	
31 August 2015	MF	(France) Enzo Reale	23	(France) Clermont Foot	Free	
27 January 2015	DF	(Ivory Coast) Lamine Koné	25	(England) Sunderland	Undisclosed	

=== Loans out ===
Date	Pos.	Player	Age	Loaned to	Return date	Notes
1 July 2015	DF	(France) Maxence Derrien	21	(France) Avranches	30 June 2016	
22 July 2015	MF	(France) Pierre Lavenant	19	(France) Sedan	30 June 2016	
6 August 2015	MF	(France) Yoann Wachter	23	(France) Sedan	30 June 2016	
3 January 2016	MF	(France) Denis Bouanga	23	(France) Strasbourg	30 June 2016	
1 February 2016	MF	(France) Valentin Lavigne	21	(France) Laval	30 June 2016	

== Competitions ==
=== Ligue 1 ===
==== League table ====
Pos	Team	Pld	W	D	L	GF	GA	GD	Pts
13	Marseille	38	10	18	10	48	42	+6	48
14	Nantes	38	12	12	14	33	44	−11	48
15	Lorient	38	11	13	14	47	58	−11	46
16	Guingamp	38	11	11	16	47	56	−9	44
17	Toulouse	38	9	13	16	45	55	−10	40

Source: Ligue 1, Soccerway
Rules for classification: 1) Points; 2) Goal difference; 3) Goals scored; 4) Head-to-head points; 5) Head-to-head goal difference; 6) Fairplay ranking.

==== Results summary ====
Overall								Home						Away					
Pld	W	D	L	GF	GA	GD	Pts	W	D	L	GF	GA	GD	W	D	L	GF	GA	GD
38	11	13	14	47	58	−11	46	7	7	5	26	21	+5	4	6	9	21	37	−16

Last updated: 15 May 2015.
Source: Competitive matches

==== Results by round ====
Round	1	2	3	4	5	6	7	8	9	10	11	12	13	14	15	16	17	18	19	20	21	22	23	24	25	26	27	28	29	30	31	32	33	34	35	36	37	38
Ground	A	H	H	A	H	A	H	A	H	A	H	A	H	H	A	H	A	A	H	A	H	A	H	A	H	A	H	A	A	H	A	H	A	H	A	H	A	H
Result	D	D	L	L	W	W	W	L	W	D	D	D	W	L	D	D	W	L	D	D	L	L	W	L	D	L	W	W	D	D	L	L	W	D	L	L	L	W
Position	11	12	15	18	17	10	9	10	9	10	10	9	7	9	9	9	8	8	8	9	12	12	12	12	12	14	13	10	12	12	13	14	13	14	15	16	16	15

Source: Ligue1
A = Away; H = Home; W = Win; D = Draw; L = Loss

==== Matches ====
Win Draw Loss

9 August 2015 1	Lyon	0–0	Lorient	Lyon
21:00 CEST (UTC+02:00)	Ferri (yellow card) 51'	Report	Lautoa (yellow card) 32'; Bellugou (yellow card) 81'	Stadium: Stade de Gerland; Attendance: 28,116; Referee: Benoît Millot

16 August 2015 2	Lorient	1–1	Bastia	Lorient
17:00 CEST (UTC+02:00)	Moukandjo (yellow card) 59', (goal) 90' (pen.); Mesloub (yellow card) 85'; Fofana (yellow card) 90+2'	Report	Ayité 4'; Marange (yellow card) 28'; Djiku (yellow card) 56'	Stadium: Stade du Moustoir; Attendance: 12,235; Referee: Clément Turpin

23 August 2015 3	Lorient	0–1	Saint-Étienne	Lorient
17:00 CEST (UTC+02:00)	Lecomte (red card) 1'	Report	Bayal Sall (yellow card) 31'; Hamouma (yellow card) 60', (goal) 87'; Monnet-Paquet (yellow card) 65'	Stadium: Stade du Moustoir; Attendance: 13,075; Referee: Frank Schneider

29 August 2015 4	Reims	4–1	Lorient	Reims
20:00 CEST (UTC+02:00)	Charbonnier 23'; Signorino (yellow card) 51'; De Préville 54'; Turan (yellow card) 57', (goal) 85'; Kyei 66'; Siebatcheu (yellow card) 78'	Report	Moukandjo (yellow card) 44'; Bouanga 48'	Stadium: Stade Auguste Delaune; Attendance: 11,041; Referee: Johan Hamel

12 September 2015 5	Lorient	3–1	Angers	Lorient
20:00 CEST (UTC+02:00)	Jouffre 46'; Ndong (yellow card) 68'; Waris 72'; Jeannot 90+3'	Report	Saïss 33'; Camara (yellow card) 66'	Stadium: Stade du Moustoir; Attendance: 9,874; Referee: Jérôme Miguelgorry

20 September 2015 6	Monaco	2–3	Lorient	Monaco
17:00 CEST (UTC+02:00)	Touré 21'; Lemar 47'; Raggi (yellow card) 75'; Coentrão (yellow card) 87'; Carrillo (yellow card) 87'; Carvalho (yellow card) 90+2'	Report	Ndong 12'; Jeannot 18'; Koné (yellow card) 23'; Guerreiro (yellow card) 43'; Philippoteaux (yellow card) 50'; Moukandjo 59'; Abdullah (yellow card) 61'	Stadium: Stade Louis II; Attendance: 6,140; Referee: Amaury Delerue

23 September 2015 7	Lorient	2–0	Caen	Lorient
19:00 CEST (UTC+02:00)	Le Goff (yellow card) 11'; Moukandjo 13'; Waris 36'; Bellugou (yellow card) 51'	Report	Ben Youssef (yellow card) 71'; Nkololo (yellow card) 75'	Stadium: Stade du Moustoir; Attendance: 9,067; Referee: Saïd Ennjimi

27 September 2015 8	Montpellier	2–1	Lorient	Montpellier
17:00 CEST (UTC+02:00)	Bensebaini 6', (yellow card) 47'; Martin 57', (yellow card) 57'	Report	Gassama (yellow card) 30'; Koné (yellow card) 38'; Abdullah 48', (yellow card) 61' (yellow-red card) 90+2'; Philippoteaux (yellow card) 49'; Le Goff (yellow card) 86'	Stadium: Stade de la Mosson; Attendance: 10,518; Referee: Saïd Ennjimi

4 October 2015 9	Lorient	3–2	Bordeaux	Lorient
17:00 CEST (UTC+02:00)	Moukandjo 47'; Waris 64' (pen.); Touré 79'; Gassama (red card) 82'	Report	Rolán 38'; Poko (yellow card) 60' (yellow-red card) 82'; Poundjé (yellow card) 79'; Ounas 89'	Stadium: Stade du Moustoir; Attendance: 10,407; Referee: Clément Turpin

18 October 2015 10	Marseille	1–1	Lorient	Marseille
14:00 CEST (UTC+02:00)	Batshuayi 21' (pen.); Rolando (yellow card) 88'	Report	Bellugou (yellow card) 21'; Moukandjo 37'; Paye (yellow card) 43'; Ndong (yellow card) 82'	Stadium: Stade Vélodrome; Attendance: 32,232; Referee: Sébastien Moreira

24 October 2015 11	Lorient	1–1	Rennes	Lorient
17:00 CEST (UTC+02:00)	Guerreiro 25'; Koné (yellow card) 62' (yellow-red card) 67'	Report	Sio (yellow card) 32' (yellow-red card) 85'; Grosicki 68'	Stadium: Stade du Moustoir; Attendance: 14,492; Referee: Benoît Bastien

31 October 2015 12	Guingamp	2–2	Lorient	Guingamp
20:00 CET (UTC+01:00)	Briand 1'; Sankharé (yellow card) 24' (yellow-red card) 45'; Benezet (yellow card) 40'; Mathis (yellow card) 65'; Salibur 83'	Report	Waris (red card) 43'; Moukandjo 64' (pen.), 90+3'; Mesloub (yellow card) 64'	Stadium: Stade du Roudourou; Attendance: 14,085; Referee: Nicolas Rainville

7 November 2015 13	Lorient	4–1	Troyes	Lorient
20:00 CET (UTC+01:00)	Jeannot 33'; Moukandjo 58' 90+2' (pen.); Ndong 78'	Report	Nivet 63' (pen.)	Stadium: Stade du Moustoir; Attendance: 9,338; Referee: Hakim Ben El Hadj

21 November 2015 14	Lorient	1–2	Paris Saint-Germain	Lorient
17:00 CET (UTC+01:00)	Ndong (yellow card) 28'; Gassama (yellow card) 38'; Moukandjo 82'	Report	Ongenda 26'; Matuidi 32'; Rabiot (yellow card) 78'	Stadium: Stade du Moustoir; Attendance: 15,417; Referee: Stéphane Lannoy

28 November 2015 15	Gazélec Ajaccio	1–1	Lorient	Ajaccio, Corsica
20:00 CET (UTC+01:00)	Lemoigne (yellow card) 4'; Larbi 18'; Boutaïb (yellow card) 29'	Report	Moukandjo 31' (pen.); Mesloub (yellow card) 33'	Stadium: Stade Ange Casanova; Attendance: 3,514; Referee: Jérôme Miguelgorry

1 December 2015 16	Lorient	0–0	Nice	Lorient
19:00 CET (UTC+01:00)	Moukandjo (yellow card) 65'; Ndong (yellow card) 87'	Report	Genevois (yellow card) 36'; Pereira (yellow card) 38'; Koziello (yellow card) 72'; Le Marchand (yellow card) 77'; Hult (yellow card) 90'	Stadium: Stade du Moustoir; Attendance: 9,218; Referee: Mikaël Lesage

5 December 2015 17	Toulouse	2–3	Lorient	Toulouse
20:00 CET (UTC+01:00)	Bodiger (yellow card) 20'; Kana-Biyik 41'; Ben Yedder 59'	Report	Jeannot (yellow card) 27', (goal) 47', 48'; François Bellugou (yellow card) 46'; Mesloub 76'	Stadium: Stadium Municipal; Attendance: 14,354; Referee: Stéphane Jochem

12 December 2015 18	Lille	3–0	Lorient	Villeneuve d'Ascq
20:00 CET (UTC+01:00)	Bauthéac 28', 55'; Balmont (yellow card) 33'; Benzia (yellow card) 38'; Sidibé 84'	Report	Gassama (yellow card) 45+1'; Ndong (yellow card) 61'	Stadium: Stade Pierre-Mauroy; Attendance: 28,170; Referee: Jerome Miguelgorry

19 December 2015 19	Lorient	0–0	Nantes	Lorient
20:00 CET (UTC+01:00)		Report	Dubois (yellow card) 28'; Audel (yellow card) 76'; Thomasson (yellow card) 90+1'	Stadium: Stade du Moustoir; Attendance: 14,711; Referee: Fredy Fautrel

9 January 2016 20	Rennes	2–2	Lorient	Rennes
20:00 CET (UTC+01:00)	Dembélé 35'; Boga 41'	Report	Diagne 4' (o.g.); Waris 22'; Ndong (yellow card) 47'	Stadium: Roazhon Park; Attendance: 26,936; Referee: Frank Schneider

17 January 2016 21	Lorient	0–2	Monaco	Lorient
14:00 CET (UTC+01:00)	Ndong (yellow card) 29'; Jouffre (yellow card) 40'	Report	Lemar 53'; Moutinho 57'; Coentrão (yellow card) 65'	Stadium: Stade du Moustoir; Attendance: 10,742; Referee: Benoît Bastien

23 January 2016 22	Nice	2–1	Lorient	Nice
20:00 CET (UTC+01:00)	Baysse (yellow card) 18'; Ben Arfa 35'; Koziello 44'	Report	Jouffre 24'; Koné (yellow card) 63'; Ndong (yellow card) 81'	Stadium: Allianz Riviera; Attendance: 13,871; Referee: Stéphane Jochem

30 January 2016 23	Lorient	2–0	Reims	Lorient
20:00 CET (UTC+01:00)	Abdullah (yellow card) 4'; Touré 15', 51'; Jouffre (yellow card) 45+1'; Mulumba (yellow card) 82'	Report	Kankava (yellow card) 19'; Traoré (yellow card) 30'	Stadium: Stade du Moustoir; Attendance: 10,002; Referee: Jerome Miguelgorry

3 February 2016 24	Paris Saint-Germain	3–1	Lorient	Paris
21:00 CET (UTC+01:00)	Cavani 6'; Augustin (yellow card) 37'; Ibrahimović 55'; Kurzawa 69'	Report	Guerreiro 19'; Abdullah (yellow card) 51'	Stadium: Parc de Princes; Attendance: 45,358; Referee: Hakim Bel El Hadj

6 February 2016 25	Lorient	1–1	Montpellier	Lorient
20:00 CET (UTC+01:00)	Jouffre (yellow card) 28'; Bellugou (red card) 37'; Cabot 49'	Report	Bérigaud 45+1'; Yatabaré (yellow card) 88'	Stadium: Stade du Moustoir; Attendance: 9,077; Referee: Mikael Lesage

13 February 2016 26	Nantes	2–1	Lorient	Nantes
20:00 CET (UTC+01:00)	Adryan 10'; Sala 39'; Bammou (yellow card) 80'	Report	Touré (yellow card) 53'; Ndong (yellow card) 55'; Cabot (yellow card) 71'; Moukandjo 79' (pen.); Gassama (red card) 85'	Stadium: Stade de la Beaujoire; Attendance: 22,256; Referee: Antony Gautier

20 February 2016 27	Lorient	4–3	Guingamp	Lorient
20:00 CET (UTC+01:00)	Waris 38', 49'; Ndong 39'; Jeannot 48' (yellow card) 89'; Rose (yellow card) 81'; Le Goff (yellow card) 88'; Guerreiro 90+2'	Report	Salibur 3', 37'; Briand 59'; Sankharé (yellow card) 90+1'	Stadium: Stade du Moustoir; Attendance: 12,229; Referee: Bartolomeu Varela

27 February 2016 28	Troyes	0–1	Lorient	Troyes
20:00 CET (UTC+01:00)	Ngcongca (yellow card) 50'; Camus (red card) 90'; Court (yellow card) 90+2'	Report	Waris 3'; Philippoteaux (yellow card) 70'	Stadium: Stade de l'Aube; Attendance: 10,326; Referee: Saïd Ennjimi

5 March 2016 29	Bastia	0–0	Lorient	Furiani
20:00 CET (UTC+1)	Mostefa (yellow card) 36'; Leca (yellow card) 87'; Cahuzac (yellow card) 88'	Report	Bellugou (yellow card) 45'; Abdullah (yellow card) 65'; Barthelme (yellow card) 68'; Guerreiro (yellow card) 88'	Stadium: Stade Armand Cesari; Attendance: 10,586; Referee: Jérôme Miguelgorry

12 March 2016 30	Lorient	1–1	Marseille	Lorient
17:00 CET (UTC+1)	Waris 34'; Gassama (yellow card) 82'	Report	Isla 46'; Silva (yellow card) 67'; Cabella (yellow card) 68'	Stadium: Stade du Moustoir; Attendance: 15,599; Referee: Ruddy Buquet

19 March 2016 31	Angers	5–1	Lorient	Angers
20:00 CEST (UTC+02:00)	Ketkeophomphone 14'; Mangai 34' (90+1), pen.' Cheikh Ndoye 40'; Andreu (yellow card) 63'; Ndoye 81'	Report	Gassama (yellow card) 4'; Ndong (yellow card) 38'; Waris 41', (yellow card) 60'; Le Goff (yellow card) 72'	Stadium: Stade Jean-Bouin; Attendance: 11,553; Referee: Johan Hamel

3 April 2016 32	Lorient	1–3	Lyon	Lorient
21:00 CEST (UTC+2)	Wars 36'	Report	Lacazette 44', 84'; Ghezzal 81'	Stadium: Stade du Moustoir; Attendance: 15,132

9 April 2016 33	Caen	1–2	Lorient	Caen
20:00 CEST (UTC+2)	Appiah 64'; Vercoutre (yellow card) 75'	Report	Jeannot 17'; Waris 47' (pen.)	Stadium: Stade Michel d'Ornano; Attendance: 17,408; Referee: Tony Chapron

16 April 2016 34	Lorient	1–1	Toulouse	Lorient
20:00 CEST (UTC+2)	Touré (yellow card) 78'; Touré 90+1'	Report	Ben Yedder 49'; Trejo (yellow card) 74'; Moubandje (yellow card) 77'	Stadium: Stade du Moustoir; Attendance: 13,212; Referee: Stéphane Lannoy

24 April 2016 35	Saint-Étienne	2–0	Lorient	Saint-Étienne
17:00 CEST (UTC+2)	Roux (yellow card) 65', (goal) 76'; Eysseric (yellow card) 81'	Report	Jeannot (yellow card) 74'	Stadium: Stade Geoffroy-Guichard; Attendance: 29,550; Referee: Amaury Delerue

30 April 2016 36	Lorient	0–1	Lille	Lorient
20:00 CEST (UTC+2)	Gassama (yellow card) 71'	Report	Lopes 56'; Obbadi (yellow card) 65'; Amalfitano (yellow card) 90'	Stadium: Stade du Moustoir; Attendance: 11,501; Referee: Benoît Bastien

7 May 2016 37	Bordeaux	3–0	Lorient	Bordeaux
21:00 CEST (UTC+2)	Malcom 12'; Diabaté 21', 48'	Report	Guerreiro (yellow card) 85'	Stadium: Nouveau Stade de Bordeaux; Attendance: 23,117; Referee: Stéphane Jochem

14 May 2016 38	Lorient	1–0	Gazélec Ajaccio	Lorient
21:00 CEST (UTC+2)	Bellugou (yellow card) 10'; Moukandjo 27'; Jeannot (yellow card) 90+1'	Report	Tshibumbu (yellow card) 74'	Stadium: Stade du Moustoir; Attendance: 12,616; Referee: Benoît Millot

=== Coupe de la Ligue ===
28 October 2015 Round of 32	Lorient	3–2	Montpellier	Lorient
21:00 CET (UTC+01:00)	Jeannot 6' (pen.); Gakpa 36'; Philippoteaux 40'; Mulumba (yellow card) 82'	Report	N'Diaye 13'; Deza (yellow card) 83'; Camara 84'	Stadium: Stade du Moustoir; Attendance: 9,699; Referee: Wilfried Bien

15 December 2015 Round of 16	Lorient	3–0	Dijon	Lorient
20:00 CET (UTC+01:00)	Jeannot 37'; Philippoteaux 52'; Koné (yellow card) 58'; Mesloub 87'	Report	Sané (yellow card) 24' (yellow-red card) 47'; Belmonte (yellow card) 33'; Bénet (yellow card) 39'	Stadium: Stade du Moustoir; Attendance: 8,820; Referee: Saïd Ennjimi

12 January 2016 Quarter-final	Bordeaux	2–0	Lorient	Bordeaux
21:00 CET (UTC+01:00)	Plašil 44'; Chaigneau 56' (o.g.); Crivelli (yellow card) 90'	Report		Stadium: Nouveau Stade de Bordeaux; Attendance: 8,676; Referee: Nicolas Rainville

=== Coupe de France ===
3 January 2016 Round of 64	Lorient	3–2 (a.e.t.)	Tours	Lorient
13:15 CET (UTC+01:00)	Majeed 26' (pen.); Philippoteaux 57'; Jeannot 99'	Report	Agouazi (yellow card) 39'; Tandia 50'; Belkebla 64'; Gradit (yellow card) 90'	Stadium: Stade du Moustoir; Attendance: 3,056; Referee: Ruddy Buquet

20 January 2016 Round of 32	Boulogne	1–3 (a.e.t.)	Lorient	Boulogne-sur-Mer
18:30 CET (UTC+01:00)	Bonenfant 76'	Report	Fofana 49'; Jeannot 102', 117'	Stadium: Stade de la Libération; Attendance: 8,000; Referee: Benoît Millot

10 February 2016 Round of 16	US Sarre-Union	0–4	Lorient	Sarre-Union
19:00 CET (UTC+01:00)	Dje (yellow card) 41'	Report	Abdullah (yellow card) 32'; Ndong (yellow card) 38'; Jeannot 51', 90'; Fofana 74'; Mulumba (yellow card) 80'; Barthelme 81'	Stadium: Stade Omnisports; Referee: Sébastien Moreira

2 March 2016 Quarter-final	Lorient	3–0	Gazélec Ajaccio	Lorient
19:00 CET (UTC+01:00)	Philippoteaux 9'; Ndong (yellow card) 32'; Barthelme 43'; Paye 90'	Report	Tshibumbu (yellow card) 22'; Filippi (red card) 45'	Stadium: Stade du Moustoir; Attendance: 10,000; Referee: Benoît Millot

19 April 2016 Semi-final	Lorient	0–1	Paris Saint-Germain	Lorient
21:00 CEST (UTC+02:00)	Ndong (yellow card) 56'; Mesloub (yellow card) 82'		Matuidi (yellow card) 56'; Ibrahimović (yellow card) 64', (goal) 75'	Stadium: Stade du Moustoir
