= 2016–17 FC Lorient season =

FC Lorient
2016–17 season
- Chairman: Loïc Féry
- Manager: Bernard Casoni
- Ligue 1: 18th (relegated)
- Coupe de France: Round of 16
- Coupe de la Ligue: Third Round
- Top goalscorer: League: Benjamin Moukandjo (13); All: Benjamin Moukandjo (13)
- Highest home attendance: 15,884 (v Bordeaux); Ligue 1, 20 May 2017
- Lowest home attendance: 8,667 (v Nancy); Ligue 1, 10 September 2016
Home colours	Away colours	Third colours

The 2016–17 FC Lorient season is the 91st professional season of the club since its creation in 1926.

== Players ==
French teams are limited to four players without EU citizenship. Hence, the squad list includes only the principal nationality of each player; several non-European players on the squad have dual citizenship with an EU country. Also, players from the ACP countries—countries in Africa, the Caribbean, and the Pacific that are signatories to the Cotonou Agreement—are not counted against non-EU quotas due to the Kolpak ruling.

=== Current squad ===
As of 18 October 2016.

Note: Flags indicate national team as defined under FIFA eligibility rules; some limited exceptions apply. Players may hold more than one non-FIFA nationality.

No.	Pos.	Nation	Player
1	GK	FRA	Anthony Lamonge
3	DF	FRA	Bradley Mazikou
4	MF	FRA	Mattéo Guendouzi
5	DF	SEN	Zargo Touré
6	DF	FRA	François Bellugou
7	MF	COD	Arnold Mvuemba
8	MF	POR	Cafú
9	FW	GHA	Abdul Majeed Waris
10	MF	FRA	Sylvain Marveaux
12	FW	CMR	Benjamin Moukandjo
13	DF	FRA	Michaël Ciani
14	FW	FRA	Jérémie Aliadière
15	DF	FRA	Mathieu Peybernes
16	GK	FRA	Paul Delecroix
17	MF	ALG	Walid Mesloub

No.	Pos.	Nation	Player
18	FW	FRA	Alexis Claude-Maurice
19	MF	FRA	Romain Philippoteaux
20	DF	FRA	Steven Moreira
21	MF	GUI	Mohamed Mara
22	FW	FRA	Benjamin Jeannot
23	MF	GHA	Alhassan Wakaso
24	DF	NCL	Wesley Lautoa
25	DF	FRA	Vincent Le Goff
26	MF	TUN	Issam Ben Khémis
27	MF	FRA	Jimmy Cabot
28	MF	FRA	Maxime Barthelmé
29	DF	FRA	Pape Paye
32	DF	GUI	Ibrahima Conté
34	DF	CIV	Erwin Koffi
40	GK	FRA	Benjamin Lecomte (captain)

=== Out on loan ===
Note: Flags indicate national team as defined under FIFA eligibility rules; some limited exceptions apply. Players may hold more than one non-FIFA nationality.

No.	Pos.	Nation	Player
—	DF	FRA	Lindsay Rose (on loan to Bastia)
—	DF	GAB	Yoann Wachter (on loan to Sedan)
—	DF	FRA	Faïz Selemani (on loan to Tours)
—	MF	FRA	Pierre Lavenant (on loan to Avranches)

No.	Pos.	Nation	Player
—	MF	GAB	Denis Bouanga (on loan to Tours)
—	FW	FRA	Marvin Gakpa (on loan to Ajaccio)
—	FW	FRA	Valentin Lavigne (on loan to Brest)

== Transfers ==
=== Summer ===
In:

No.	Pos.	Nation	Player
2	DF	FRA	Lindsay Rose (from (France) Lyon, previously on loan)
8	MF	POR	Cafú (from (Portugal) Vitória de Guimarães)
10	MF	FRA	Sylvain Marveaux (from (England) Newcastle United)
11	DF	COM	Faïz Selemani (from (France) Chamois Niortais)
16	GK	FRA	Paul Delecroix (from (France) Chamois Niortais)

Out:

No.	Pos.	Nation	Player
7	MF	GAB	Didier Ibrahim N'Dong (to (England) Sunderland)
8	MF	FRA	Yann Jouffre (to (France) Metz)
13	MF	FRA	Rafidine Abdullah (to (Spain) Cádiz)
14	DF	POR	Raphaël Guerreiro (to (Germany) Borussia Dortmund)

=== Winter ===
In:

No.	Pos.	Nation	Player
17	DF	FRA	Mathieu Peybernes (from (France) Bastia)
23	MF	GHA	Alhassan Wakaso (from (Portugal) Rio Ave)

Out:

No.	Pos.	Nation	Player
11	DF	FRA	Faïz Selemani (on loan to (France) Tours)
23	FW	CIV	Moryké Fofana (to (Turkey) Konyaspor)
26	DF	FRA	Lindsay Rose (on loan to (France) Bastia)

== Competitions ==
=== Ligue 1 ===
==== League table ====
Pos	Team	Pld	W	D	L	GF	GA	GD	Pts	Qualification or relegation
16	Dijon	38	8	13	17	46	58	−12	37	
17	Caen	38	10	7	21	36	65	−29	37	
18	Lorient (R)	38	10	6	22	44	70	−26	36	Qualification for the relegation play-offs
19	Nancy (R)	38	9	8	21	29	52	−23	35	Relegation to Ligue 2
20	Bastia (D, R)	38	8	10	20	29	54	−25	34	Relegation to National 3 (Note: After being relegated to Ligue 2, Bastia was initially further relegated to National due to financial difficulties. On 10 August 2017, the FFF announced that Bastia was denied entry to National. The club therefore took the place of its reserve team in Championnat National 3.)

Source: Ligue 1, Soccerway
Rules for classification: 1) Points; 2) Goal difference; 3) Goals scored; 4) Head-to-head goal difference; 5) Fairplay ranking.
(D) Disqualified; (R) Relegated

==== Results summary ====
Overall								Home						Away					
Pld	W	D	L	GF	GA	GD	Pts	W	D	L	GF	GA	GD	W	D	L	GF	GA	GD
38	10	6	22	44	70	−26	36	7	4	8	25	29	−4	3	2	14	19	41	−22

Last updated: 20 May 2017.

==== Results by round ====
Round	1	2	3	4	5	6	7	8	9	10	11	12	13	14	15	16	17	18	19	20	21	22	23	24	25	26	27	28	29	30	31	32	33	34	35	36	37	38
Ground	A	H	A	H	H	A	H	A	H	A	H	A	H	A	H	A	A	H	A	H	A	H	A	H	A	H	A	H	H	A	H	A	A	H	A	H	A	H
Result	L	L	L	L	W	L	W	L	L	L	D	L	L	D	W	D	L	W	L	W	L	L	W	D	L	L	L	L	L	W	W	W	L	W	L	D	L	D
Position	20	20	20	20	18	20	18	20	20	20	20	20	20	20	20	20	20	20	20	19	20	20	20	20	20	20	20	20	20	20	19	18	18	16	16	17	18	18

A = Away; H = Home; W = Win; D = Draw; L = Loss

==== Matches ====
13 August 2016 1	Caen	3–2	Lorient	Caen
20:00	Rodelin 32'; Santini 43', 87'; Yahia (yellow card) 86'	Summary	Moukandjo 5', 19' (pen.); Le Goff (yellow card) 22'; Touré (red card) 26'; Selemani (yellow card) 85'	Stadium: Stade Michel d'Ornano; Attendance: 16,920; Referee: (France) Johan Hamel

20 August 2016 2	Lorient	0–3	Bastia	Lorient
20:00	N'Dong (red card) 30'; Philippoteaux (yellow card) 64'; Mesloub (yellow card) 66'; Jeannot (red card) 77'	Summary	Mostefa (yellow card) 6'; Saint-Maximin 25'; Diallo (yellow card) 35'; Crivelli 38', 81'; Marange (yellow card) 44'; Djiku (yellow card) 67'	Stadium: Stade du Moustoir; Attendance: 10,248; Referee: (France) Amaury Delerue

26 August 2016 3	Marseille	2–0	Lorient	Marseille
20:45	Cabella 19'; Hubočan (yellow card) 48'; Gomis 70'	Summary	Touré (yellow card) 51'	Stadium: Stade Vélodrome; Attendance: 26,193; Referee: (France) Antony Gautier

10 September 2016 4	Lorient	0–2	Nancy	Lorient
20:00		Summary	Hadji (yellow card) 31'; Bennasser 32'; Pedretti (yellow card) 45'; Puyo (yellow card) 56'; Guidileye (yellow card) 84'; Cuffaut (yellow card) 84'; Dalé 88'	Stadium: Stade du Moustoir; Attendance: 8,323; Referee: (France) Olivier Thual

17 September 2016 5	Lorient	1–0	Lille	Lorient
20:00	Bellugou (yellow card) 25'; Touré (yellow card) 72'; Moukandjo 76' (pen.)	Summary	Sankharé (yellow card) 34'; Civelli (yellow card) 48'	Stadium: Stade du Moustoir; Attendance: 8,926; Referee: (France) Karim Abed

21 September 2016 6	Guingamp	1–0	Lorient	Guingamp
19:00	Briand 63' (pen.); Blas (yellow card) 82'	Summary	Mara (yellow card) 45+2'; Selemani (yellow card) 62'; Moreira (yellow card) 90+3'	Stadium: Stade de Roudourou; Attendance: 13,175; Referee: (France) Benoît Millot

24 September 2016 7	Lorient	1–0	Lyon	Lorient
17:00	Cabot 51', (yellow card) 62'; Cafú (yellow card) 90'	Summary	Valbuena (yellow card) 82'	Stadium: Stade du Moustoir; Attendance: 10,628; Referee: (France) Mikael Lesage

2 October 2016 8	OGC Nice	2–1	Lorient	Nice
17:00	Ricardo 11'; Sarr (yellow card) 59'; Balotelli 86', (yellow card) 87' (yellow-red card) 90+2'; Eysseric (yellow card) 88'	Summary	Bellugou (yellow card) 27'; Moukandjo 61'; Cafú (yellow card) 85'; Moreira (yellow card) 90+2'	Stadium: Allianz Riviera; Attendance: 17,816; Referee: (France) Olivier Thual

15 October 2016 9	Lorient	1–2	Nantes	Lorient
20:00	Mvuemba (yellow card) 27'; Touré (yellow card) 62'; Hamel 80'; Moreira (yellow card) 90'; Ciani (yellow card) 90+4'	Summary	Dubois (yellow card) 39'; Bammou 42'; Sala (yellow card) 49'; Gillet 74'; Thomasson (yellow card) 90'; Kwateng (yellow card) 90+1'	Stadium: Stade du Moustoir; Attendance: 12,458; Referee: (France) Benoît Bastien

22 October 2016 10	Dijon	1–0	Lorient	Dijon
20:00	Lotiès 90+1'; Bahamboula (yellow card) 90+1'	Summary	Guendouzi (yellow card) 45'; Cafú (yellow card) 89'	Stadium: Stade Gaston Gérard; Attendance: 8,558; Referee: (France) Sébastien Desiage

29 October 2016 11	Lorient	2–2	Montpellier	Lorient
20:00	Touré 16'; Marveaux 24'; Barthelmé (yellow card) 67'; Waris (yellow card) 90+2'	Summary	Vanden Borre (yellow card) 37'; Camara 45+2'; Sanson 69'	Stadium: Stade du Moustoir; Attendance: 9,872; Referee: (France) Jérôme Miguelgorry

5 November 2016 12	Bordeaux	2–1	Lorient	Bordeaux
20:00	Kamano 28', (yellow card) 86'; Vada (yellow card) 61'; Rolán 73'; Ménez (yellow card) 78'	Report	Mara (yellow card) 54'; Prior 62' (o.g.); Guendouzi (yellow card) 71'; Mesloub (red card) 86'	Stadium: Matmut Atlantique; Attendance: 16,331; Referee: (France) Karim Abed

18 November 2016 13	Lorient	0–3	Monaco	Lorient
19:00		Report	Jemerson (yellow card) 27'; Falcao 64'; Lemar 67'; Boschilia 90+3'	Stadium: Stade du Moustoir; Attendance: 9,574; Referee: (France) Fredy Fautrel

26 November 2016 14	Metz	3–3	Lorient	Metz
20:00	Falette 11', (yellow card) 30'; Vion 75', 78'; Iván Balliu (yellow card) 87'	Report	Waris 16'; Moukandjo 54', 61' (pen.); Mvuemba (yellow card) 65'; Bellugou (yellow card) 70'	Stadium: Stade Saint-Symphorien; Attendance: 12,657; Referee: (France) Mikael Lesage

29 November 2016 15	Lorient	2–1	Rennes	Lorient
19:00	Mvuemba (yellow card) 21'; Ciani 28'; Waris 46'	Report	Sio 32'; Baal (yellow card) 89'	Stadium: Stade du Moustoir; Attendance: 10,082; Referee: (France) Stéphane Lannoy

3 December 2016 16	Angers	2–2	Lorient	Angers
20:00	Diedhiou 26' (pen.); N'Doye 58'	Report	Marveaux 23'; Le Goff (yellow card) 25'; Waris 66'	Stadium: Stade Raymond Kopa; Attendance: 9,142; Referee: (France) Olivier Thual

10 December 2016 17	Toulouse	3–2	Lorient	Toulouse
20:00	Toivonen 8', 20', 60'; Braithwaite (yellow card) 83'; Durmaz (yellow card) 90+3'	Report	Moukandjo 27'; Waris 89'	Stadium: Stadium Municipal; Attendance: 14,288; Referee: (France) Karim Abed

17 December 2016 18	Lorient	2–1	Saint-Étienne	Lorient
20:00	Philippoteaux (yellow card) 15', (goal) 39'; Lautoa (yellow card) 67'; Le Goff (yellow card) 73'; Ciani (yellow card) 75'; Cabot 90'	Report	Moulin (red card) 10'; M'Bengue (yellow card) 47'; Pierre-Gabriel (yellow card) 80'; Pajot 90+2'	Stadium: Stade du Moustoir - Yves Allainmat; Attendance: 11,581; Referee: (France) Mikael Lesage

21 December 2016 19	Paris Saint-Germain	5–0	Lorient	Paris
20:50	Meunier 25'; Touré 44' (o.g.); Silva 50'; Cavani 63' (pen.); Lucas 70'	Report	Delecroix (yellow card) 62'	Stadium: Parc des Princes; Attendance: 44,844; Referee: (France) Johan Hamel

14 January 2017 20	Lorient	3–1	Guingamp	Lorient
20:00	Waris (yellow card) 58', (goal) 72', 90'; Mvuemba (yellow card) 79'; Cabot 82'	Report	Briand (yellow card) 19'; Salibur 40'; Didot (yellow card) 48'; Deaux (yellow card) 86'	Stadium: Stade du Moustoir - Yves Allainmat; Attendance: 12,463; Referee: (France) Sébastien Desiage

22 January 2017 21	Monaco	4–0	Lorient	Monaco
15:00	Boschilia 24', 28'; Germain 37', 59'; Sidibé (yellow card) 90'	Report	Lautoa (yellow card) 11'	Stadium: Stade Louis II; Attendance: 5,549; Referee: (France) Amaury Delerue

28 January 2017 22	Lorient	2–3	Dijon	Lorient
20:00	Peybernes (yellow card) 29'; Marveaux 50'; Waris 60' (pen.); Lautoa (yellow card) 69'; Mesloub (yellow card) 72'; Moreira (yellow card) 86'	Report	Diony 10'; Rüfli (yellow card) 56'; Lang (yellow card) 59'; Balmont (yellow card) 62'; Lotiès 70'; Lees-Melou 90+3'	Stadium: Stade du Moustoir - Yves Allainmat; Attendance: 9,762; Referee: (France) Olivier Thual

4 February 2017 23	Lille	0–1	Lorient	Villeneuve-d'Ascq
20:00	Béria (yellow card) 66'	Report	Wakaso (yellow card) 41'; Aliadière 49'	Stadium: Stade Pierre-Mauroy; Attendance: 38,153; Referee: (France) Jérôme Miguelgorry

8 February 2017 24	Lorient	1–1	Toulouse	Lorient
19:00	Le Goff (yellow card) 26'; Waris (yellow card) 46'; Marveaux 60'	Report	Delort 24'; Toivonen (yellow card) 71'; Diop (yellow card) 75'	Stadium: Stade du Moustoir - Yves Allainmat; Attendance: 13,230; Referee: (France) Karim Abed

12 February 2017 25	Saint-Étienne	4–0	Lorient	Saint-Étienne
17:00	Perrin 18'; Veretout 20'; Hamouma 58'; Jorginho 90+1'	Report		Stadium: Stade Geoffroy-Guichard; Attendance: 25,498; Referee: (France) Benoît Millot

18 February 2017 26	Lorient	0–1	Nice	Lorient
20:00	Marveaux (yellow card) 29'; Bellugou (yellow card) 53'; Moukandjo (yellow card) 67'	Report	Cyprien 15'; Obbadi (yellow card) 43'; Balotelli (red card) 68'; Cardinale (yellow card) 79'	Stadium: Stade du Moustoir - Yves Allainmat; Attendance: 10,537; Referee: (France) Tony Chapron

25 February 2017 27	Rennes	1–0	Lorient	Rennes
20:00	Sio 19'	Report	Touré (yellow card) 2'; Peybernes (yellow card) 80'; Waris (yellow card) 90+3'	Stadium: Roazhon Park; Attendance: 25,791; Referee: (France) Nicolas Rainville

5 March 2017 28	Lorient	1–4	Marseille	Lorient
15:00	Touré (yellow card) 5'; Peybernes (yellow card) 47'; Moukandjo 73'	Report	Rolando 6'; Payet 19'; Vainqueur (yellow card) 25'; Thauvin 53'; Sanson 56'	Stadium: Stade du Moustoir - Yves Allainmat; Attendance: 13,757; Referee: (France) Clément Turpin

12 March 2017 29	Lorient	1–2	Paris Saint-Germain	Lorient
21:00	Ciani 68'; Moreira (yellow card) 72'; Peybernes (yellow card) 83'	Report	Jeannot 28' (o.g.); Nkunku 52', (yellow card) 75'	Stadium: Stade du Moustoir - Yves Allainmat; Attendance: 13,643; Referee: (France) Tony Chapron

18 March 2017 30	Nancy	2–3	Lorient	Tomblaine
20:00	Maouassa 28'; Dia 42' (pen.); Guidileye (yellow card) 88'	Report	Wakaso (yellow card) 37'; Lautoa (yellow card) 55', (goal) 86'; Moukandjo 66'; Mvuemba 90+4'	Stadium: Stade Marcel Picot; Attendance: 16,549; Referee: (France) Frank Schneider

2 April 2017 31	Lorient	1–0	Caen	Lorient
17:00	Moukandjo 29'; Bellugou (red card) 49'; Ciani (yellow card) 54'	Summary	Yahia (yellow card) 70'; Da Silva (red card) 81'	Stadium: Stade du Moustoir - Yves Allainmat; Attendance: 14,149; Referee: (France) Karim Abed

8 April 2017 32	Lyon	1–4	Lorient	Lyon
20:00	Rafael (yellow card) 12'; Tolisso 28'; Fekir (yellow card) 44'; Mammana (yellow card) 82'	Summary	Lautoa (yellow card) 39'; Waris 42'; Marveaux 49'; Moukandjo 74', 80'	Stadium: Parc Olympique Lyonnais; Attendance: 35,595; Referee: (France) Nicolas Rainville

15 April 2017 33	Montpellier	2–0	Lorient	Montpellier
20:00	Boudebouz 8'; Mbenza 27'; Mounié (yellow card) 76'	Summary	Bellugou (yellow card) 2'; Peybernes (yellow card) 55'	Stadium: Stade de la Mosson; Attendance: 9,294; Referee: (France) Olivier Thual

22 April 2017 34	Lorient	5–1	Metz	Lorient
20:00	Ciani 13', (yellow card) 31'; Waris 49'; Cabot 60', 66'; Moukandjo 78'	Summary	Diabaté 32' (pen.); Cohade (yellow card) 77'	Stadium: Stade du Moustoir - Yves Allainmat; Attendance: 14,114; Referee: (France) Antony Gautier

29 April 2017 35	Nantes	1–0	Lorient	Nantes
20:00	Sala 89'	Summary	Lautoa (yellow card) 40'; Moreira (yellow card) 90+2'	Stadium: Stade de la Beaujoire - Louis Fonteneau; Attendance: 22,090; Referee: (France) Johan Hamel

6 May 2017 36	Lorient	1–1	Angers	Lorient
20:00	Philippoteaux 62'; Ciani (yellow card) 75'	Report	Manceau 72'	Stadium: Stade du Moustoir - Yves Allainmat; Attendance: 15,563; Referee: (France) Clément Turpin

14 May 2017 37	Bastia	2–0	Lorient	Fos-sur-Mer
21:00	Crivelli (yellow card) 3', (goal) 74'; Nangis (yellow card) 42'; Coulibaly (yellow card) 82'; Danic 86'	Summary	Mvuemba (yellow card) 53'; Waris (yellow card) 79'	Stadium: Stade Parsemain; Attendance: 0 Referee: (France) Ruddy Buquet

20 May 2017 38	Lorient	1–1	Bordeaux	Lorient
21:00	Le Goff (yellow card) 62', (goal) 69'; Philippoteaux (yellow card) 77'	Summary	Sankharé 7'; Rolán (yellow card) 61'; Contento (yellow card) 68'; Ounas (yellow card) 78'	Stadium: Stade du Moustoir - Yves Allainmat; Attendance: 15,884; Referee: (France) Antony Gautier

==== Relegation Play Off ====
25 May 2017 First Leg	Troyes	2–1	Lorient	Troyes
20:45	Confais (yellow card) 31'; Darbion 37'; Obiang (yellow card) 65'; Giraudon (yellow card) 89'; Nivet 90+1'; Tinhan (yellow card) 90+2'	Summary	Waris 82'; Ciani (yellow card) 90+3'	Stadium: Stade de l'Aube; Attendance: 14,081; Referee: (France) Ruddy Buquet

28 May 2017 Second Leg	Lorient	0–0 (1–2 agg.)	Troyes	Lorient
21:00	Philippoteaux (yellow card) 72'	Report	Niane (yellow card) 33'; Darbion (yellow card) 61'; Cordoval (yellow card) 64'	Stadium: Stade du Moustoir - Yves Allainmat; Attendance: 18,000; Referee: (France) Clément Turpin

=== Coupe de France ===
8 January 2017 Round of 64	Lorient	2–1	Nice	Lorient
14:15	Guendouzi (yellow card) 12'; Aliadière 71'; Mesloub 75'	Report	Cyprien (yellow card) 17'; Pléa 43'	Stadium: Stade du Moustoir - Yves Allainmat; Attendance: 9,424; Referee: (France) Olivier Thual

31 January 2017 Round of 32	Châteauroux	2–3 (a.e.t.)	Lorient	Châteauroux
18:00	Tounkara 5'; M'Bone (yellow card) 24'; Angoula (yellow card) 37' (yellow-red card) 109'; Siebatcheu 62'; Sofiane Khadda (yellow card) 75'; Cheick Traoré (yellow card) 120'	Report	Cafú (yellow card) 41', (goal) 77', 111' (pen.); Cabot 49'	Stadium: Stade Gaston Petit; Attendance: 2,957; Referee: (France) Hakim Ben El Hadj

28 February 2017 Round of 16	Bordeaux	2–1	Lorient	Bordeaux
21:00	Laborde 61', 72'; Lewczuk (yellow card) 75'	Report	Moreira (yellow card) 19'; Jeannot 48', (yellow card) 54'; Wakaso (yellow card) 56'	Stadium: Matmut Atlantique; Attendance: 7,151; Referee: (France) Mikael Lesage

=== Coupe de la Ligue ===
26 October 2016 Third Round	Rennes	3–2	Lorient	Rennes
21:05	Pedro Henrique 15', 90+5', (yellow card) 90+6'; Saïd 59'; Prcić (yellow card) 61'; Armand (yellow card) 86'	Report	Ben Khémis (yellow card) 45+2'; Bradley Mazikou (yellow card) 65'; Waris 87' (pen.); Lautoa 90+2'	Stadium: Roazhon Park; Attendance: 27,239; Referee: (France) Clément Turpin
