= Romain Philippoteaux =

French footballer (born 1988)

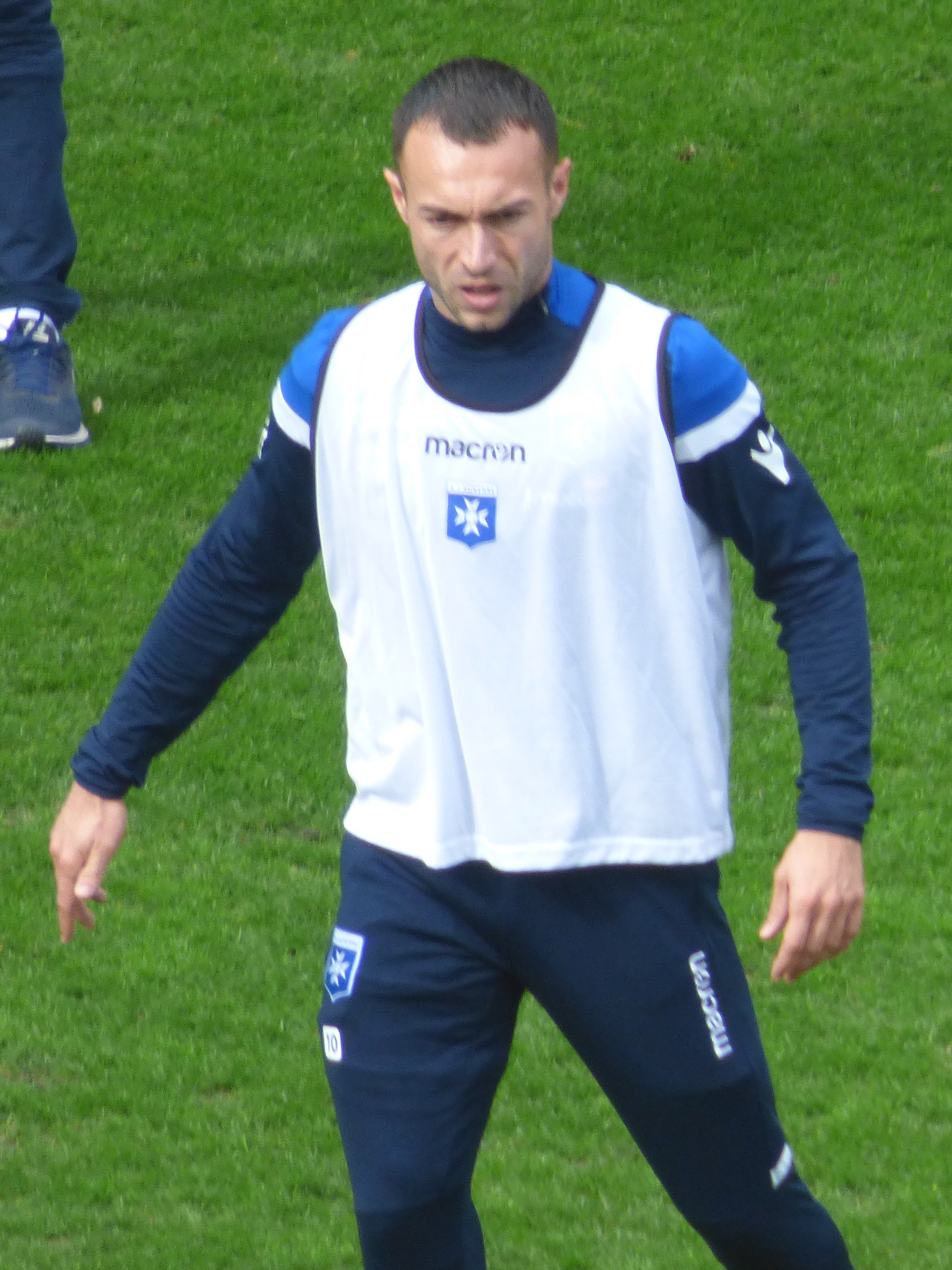
- Philippoteaux in 2019

Personal information
- Date of birth: 2 March 1988 (age 38)
- Place of birth: Apt, France
- Height: 1.75 m (5 ft 9 in)
- Position: Winger

Senior career*
| Years | Team | Apps | (Gls) |
| 2012 | Le Pontet | 12 | (7) |
| 2013–2015 | Dijon | 72 | (16) |
| 2015–2017 | Lorient | 76 | (4) |
| 2016 | Lorient II | 1 | (0) |
| 2017–2019 | Auxerre | 73 | (15) |
| 2019–2020 | Nîmes | 30 | (6) |
| 2020–2022 | Brest | 18 | (1) |
| 2021–2022 | → Dijon (loan) | 23 | (4) |
| 2022–2024 | NorthEast United | 37 | (2) |
| Total | | 342 | (55) |
- * Club domestic league appearances and goals as of 01:57, 13 April 2024 (UTC)

Romain Philippoteaux (French pronunciation: [ʁɔmɛ̃ filipɔto]; born 2 March 1988) is a former French professional footballer who played as a winger.

== Career ==
On 28 June 2019, it was confirmed, that Philippoteaux had signed a three-year contract with Nîmes Olympique.

On 3 September 2021, he returned to Dijon on a season-long loan.

On 6 September 2022, he signed a two-year contract with Indian Super League club NorthEast United.

He retired in 2024 at the age of 36.

== Career statistics ==
As of 13 April 2024

Appearances and goals by club, season and competition
| Club | Season | League | | | National cup | | League cup | | Other | | Total | |
| Club | Season | Division | Apps | Goals | Apps | Goals | Apps | Goals | Apps | Goals | Apps | Goals |
|---|---|---|---|---|---|---|---|---|---|---|---|---|
| Le Pontet | 2012–13 | CFA | 12 | 7 | 0 | 0 | 0 | 0 | 0 | 0 | 12 | 7 |
| Dijon | 2012–13 | Ligue 2 | 18 | 2 | 0 | 0 | 0 | 0 | 0 | 0 | 18 | 2 |
| Dijon | 2013–14 | Ligue 2 | 33 | 7 | 3 | 1 | 1 | 0 | 0 | 0 | 37 | 8 |
| Dijon | 2014–15 | Ligue 2 | 21 | 7 | 3 | 1 | 1 | 0 | 0 | 0 | 25 | 8 |
| Dijon | Total | | 72 | 16 | 6 | 2 | 2 | 0 | 0 | 0 | 80 | 18 |
| Lorient | 2014–15 | Ligue 1 | 15 | 2 | 0 | 0 | 0 | 0 | 0 | 0 | 15 | 2 |
| Lorient | 2015–16 | Ligue 1 | 31 | 0 | 5 | 2 | 3 | 2 | 0 | 0 | 39 | 4 |
| Lorient | 2016–17 | Ligue 1 | 30 | 2 | 2 | 0 | 0 | 0 | 2 (Note: Appearances in Ligue 1 relegation play-offs) | 0 | 34 | 2 |
| Lorient | Total | | 76 | 4 | 7 | 2 | 3 | 2 | 2 | 0 | 88 | 8 |
| Lorient II | 2016–17 | CFA | 1 | 0 | 0 | 0 | 0 | 0 | 0 | 0 | 1 | 0 |
| Auxerre | 2017–18 | Ligue 2 | 35 | 11 | 4 | 3 | 1 | 0 | 0 | 0 | 40 | 14 |
| Auxerre | 2018–19 | Ligue 2 | 38 | 4 | 1 | 0 | 3 | 1 | 0 | 0 | 42 | 5 |
| Auxerre | Total | | 73 | 15 | 5 | 3 | 4 | 1 | 0 | 0 | 82 | 19 |
| Nîmes | 2019–20 | Ligue 1 | 27 | 5 | 1 | 0 | 1 | 0 | 0 | 0 | 29 | 5 |
| Nîmes | 2020–21 | Ligue 1 | 3 | 1 | 0 | 0 | 0 | 0 | 0 | 0 | 3 | 1 |
| Nîmes | Total | | 30 | 6 | 1 | 0 | 1 | 0 | 0 | 0 | 32 | 6 |
| Brest | 2020–21 | Ligue 1 | 17 | 1 | 0 | 0 | 0 | 0 | 0 | 0 | 0 | 0 |
| Brest | 2021–22 | Ligue 1 | 1 | 0 | 0 | 0 | 0 | 0 | 0 | 0 | 0 | 0 |
| Brest | Total | | 18 | 1 | 0 | 0 | 0 | 0 | 0 | 0 | 18 | 1 |
| Dijon (loan) | 2021–22 | Ligue 2 | 23 | 4 | 0 | 0 | 0 | 0 | 0 | 0 | 23 | 4 |
| NorthEast United | 2022–23 | Indian Super League | 18 | 2 | 3 (Note: Appearance(s) in Super Cup) | 0 | 0 | 0 | 0 | 0 | 21 | 2 |
| NorthEast United | 2023–24 | Indian Super League | 19 | 0 | 3 | 0 | 5 (Note: Appearance(s) in Durand Cup) | 2 | 0 | 0 | 27 | 2 |
| NorthEast United | Total | | 37 | 2 | 6 | 0 | 5 | 2 | 0 | 0 | 48 | 4 |
| Career total | | | 342 | 55 | 25 | 7 | 15 | 5 | 2 | 0 | 384 | 76 |
