= Didier Ndong =

Gabonese footballer (born 1994)

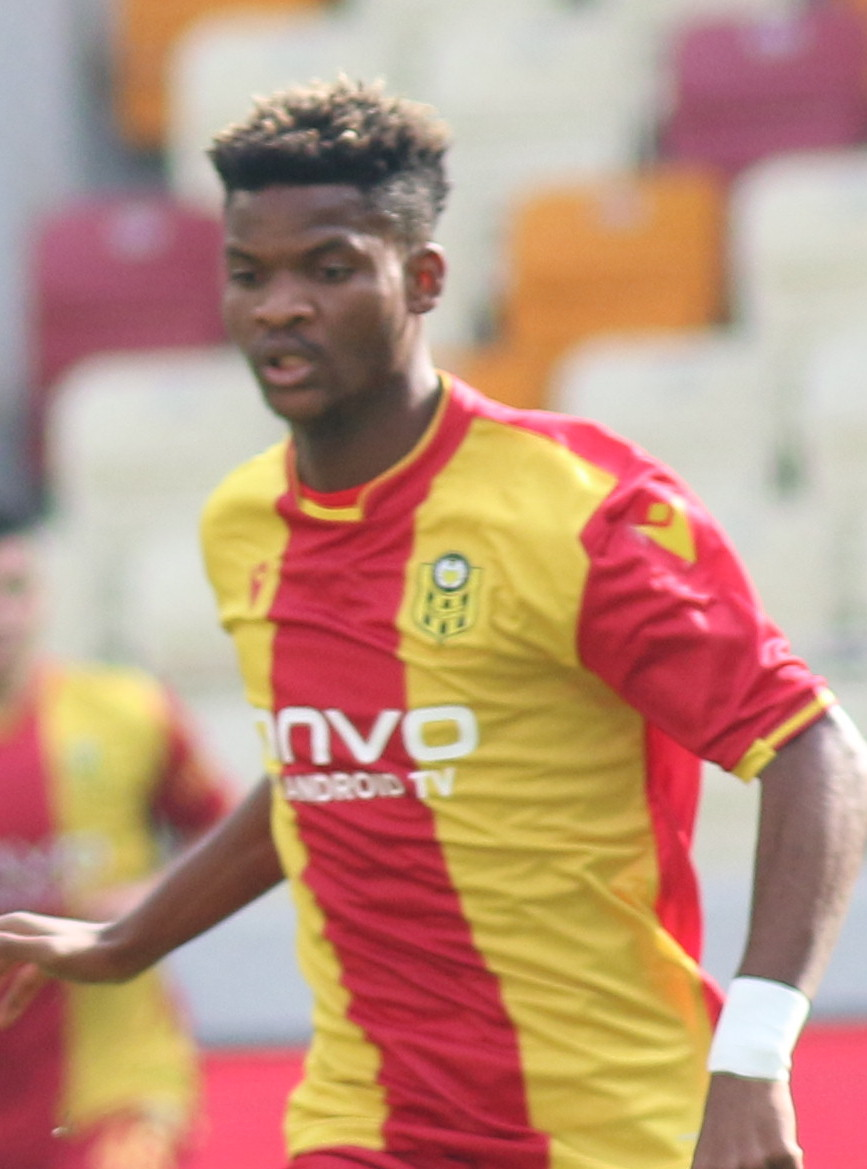
- Ndong in 2022

Personal information
- Full name: Didier Ibrahim Ndong
- Date of birth: 17 June 1994 (age 32)
- Place of birth: Lambaréné, Gabon
- Height: 1.79 m (5 ft 10 in)
- Position: Midfielder

Youth career
- Cercle Mbéri Sportif

Senior career*
Years	Team	Apps	(Gls)
2011–2015	CS Sfaxien	40	(2)
2015–2016	Lorient	48	(2)
2016–2018	Sunderland	54	(1)
2018	→ Watford (loan)	0	(0)
2019	Guingamp	12	(0)
2019–2023	Dijon	84	(0)
2021–2022	→ Yeni Malatyaspor (loan)	20	(0)
2023–2024	Al-Riyadh	26	(1)
2024–2026	Esteghlal	38	(0)

International career^{‡}
2012–2013	Gabon U20	3	(0)
2012–	Gabon	59	(1)
- * Club domestic league appearances and goals as of 10 December 2025 ‡ National team caps and goals as of 29 September 2026

Didier Ibrahim Ndong (born 17 June 1994) is a Gabonese professional footballer who plays as a midfielder for the Gabon national team.

== Club career ==
=== CS Sfaxien ===
Born in Lambaréné, Gabon, Ndong began his career at Cercle Mbéri Sportif. In 2011, Ndong moved to Tunisia, where he made his professional debut playing for CS Sfaxien during the 2011–12 CLP-1 season. He made his first appearance under then manager Nabil Kouki on 26 September 2012, starting and playing 80' minutes against JS Kairouan before being substituted off, marking his only appearance for the first team that year. The following season, Ndong made more appearances for the first team under newly appointed manager Ruud Krol, while receiving training by former Ajax defender Hatem Trabelsi, he made 12 appearances during the regular season, scoring once against Stade Tunisien on 14 April 2013, playing as an attacking right midfielder for the club from Sfax. He made six further appearances for CS Sfaxien during the playoffs helping his side to win the national championship and their 8th title overall.

=== Lorient ===
On 3 January 2015, Ndong signed for Ligue 1 side Lorient on a four-and-a-half-year contract.

=== Sunderland ===
On 31 August 2016, Ndong signed for Premier League club Sunderland, on a five-year contract, for a club record transfer fee (excluding add-ons) of £13.6 million. He made his debut on 12 September 2016, in a 3–0 defeat to Everton. Ndong was a key member of the Sunderland team in his initial season and scored his first goal for Sunderland, on 4 February 2017 in a 4–0 win over Crystal Palace. The club were later relegated to the Championship for the first time in ten years, following a 1–0 loss to Bournemouth at the Stadium of Light on 29 April 2017. He initially stayed with Sunderland following their relegation to the Championship playing regularly. On 13 January 2018, he was sent off for a straight red card against Cardiff City in what would be his final appearance for Sunderland ahead of his loan to Watford.

==== Loan to Watford ====
Ndong signed for Premier League Watford on loan on 31 January 2018 during the January Transfer Window. Although signed on a loan, Watford had an option to sign the midfielder on a permanent basis. He was suspended for his first game, following a red card in his final game for Sunderland. However, after the suspension ended, he still did not play for Watford and was an unused substitute only three times during his disappointing four-month loan spell.

==== Dismissal ====
Sunderland were relegated to EFL League One at the end of the 2017–18 season and a number of high-profile players, including Ndong, expressed their desire to leave the club rather than play in England's third tier. In May 2018, Sunderland was bought by Stewart Donald who talked publicly about his intention to get fair prices for outgoing players. Through the summer transfer window of 2018, Ndong was linked to a number of clubs, including Fiorentina, Benfica and Torino, the latter of which agreed a £6.6m fee for the player, but Ndong's personal demands proved to be a stumbling block. By the time the players were due to return for pre-season training on 2 July, a move had not materialised. Ndong failed to report to the club's training ground as expected, resulting in the club withholding the player's wages. Ndong remained absent from the club for the remainder of pre-season and the early matches of the 2018–19 season. Sunderland fans' feelings toward the club's record signing became increasingly hostile, made worse when Ndong appeared to post an image on Instagram of him sitting poolside at a holiday resort.

A similar situation was unfolding with teammate Papy Djilobodji who had also failed to return to training while trying to engineer a move away from Sunderland. When Djilobodji did eventually return to the club, he was almost immediately sacked for alleged breach of contract. Djilobodji had reached an agreement with the club to remain absent during July (with a proviso that he keep himself fit), but he returned for training late and failed a series of fitness tests. The parallels with the Ndong situation were noted at the time of Djilobodji's sacking, with public comments from Stewart Donald suggesting that the players were "deliberately devaluing themselves" in order to engineer cheaper moves away from the club. Donald hinted that legal proceedings could follow.

After the Djilobodji sacking, attention turned to Ndong, who was still absent from the club. Reports in Gabon suggested Ndong feared the repercussions of a return to North East England, including possible arrest (the grounds on which he feared he would be arrested were not made clear). Ndong's representatives suggested the player was considering commissioning a negotiator to represent him in discussions with the club. On 21 September, Ndong reportedly issued a statement via representatives that he had been spending time in Morocco, but wished to return to Sunderland to fight for his place in the team. He offered to take a pay cut. Ndong returned to the club on 24 September and, following a brief meeting with the club management, was served notice for breach of contract.

A statement from Sunderland, released on the club's official website stated:

Sunderland AFC has given notice under its contract with Didier Ndong. The player, who was under contract with the club until June 2021, failed to return to Sunderland for pre-season training in July as scheduled, nor in the subsequent months that followed. No reason was given for his failure to report and continued absence. As a result, the club has accepted Didier Ndong's repudiatory breaches of contract and notice of the same has been provided to the player. Sunderland AFC does so whilst retaining the right to pursue the player and any club he may subsequently join in relation to compensation for the value of the player.

Following his sacking, Ndong had to leave the United Kingdom due to his residence permit expiring. He returned to Gabon and began training with an unnamed club in Libreville in October 2018, amid reports of personal financial difficulties. On 11 October 2018, Sunderland released a statement on their website indicating that an amicable agreement had been reached and Ndong was no longer an employee of the club. The statement indicated that Sunderland would receive compensation when Ndong signed for a new club.

=== Guingamp ===
On 28 December 2018, En Avant Guingamp announced that they were due to sign Ndong, following medical exams and finalising a deal with Sunderland. He was officially presented on 4 January 2019.

=== Dijon ===
==== Loan to Yeni Malatyaspor ====
On 26 August 2021, he joined Turkish club Yeni Malatyaspor on a season-long loan. On 10 March 2022, he loan was terminated early by mutual consent.

=== Al-Riyadh ===
On 12 August 2023, Ndong joined Saudi Pro League club Al-Riyadh on a free transfer.

== International career ==
On 14 November 2012, Ndong made his debut for Gabon in a 2–2 draw against Portugal.

In 2013, Anicet Yala, coach of the Gabon national U20 team, called him up to be a member of the squad for the 2013 African Youth Championship in Algeria.

He played in the 2015 Africa Cup of Nations. He started the first game against Burkina Faso, playing 63 minutes, with Gabon winning 2–0. In the second match against the Congo, he played 56 minutes before being replaced by Guélor Kanga (defeated 0–1). He came on as a substitute in the third and final group match against Equatorial Guinea in the 69th minute, replacing André Poko (defeated 2–0). Gabon finished third in its group and was eliminated from the competition.

== Career statistics ==
=== Club ===
As of 10 December 2025

Appearances and goals by club, season and competition
Club	Season	League			National cup (Note: Includes Coupe de France, Coupe de la Ligue, FA Cup, League Cup, and FA Community Shield.)		League cup		Continental		Other		Total	
Club	Season	Division	Apps	Goals	Apps	Goals	Apps	Goals	Apps	Goals	Apps	Goals	Apps	Goals
CS Sfaxien	2011–12	Tunisian Ligue 1	1	0	0	0	–		0	0	–		1	0
CS Sfaxien	2012–13	Tunisian Ligue 1	18	1	0	0	–		0	0	–		18	1
CS Sfaxien	2013–14	Tunisian Ligue 1	16	1	8	1	–		0	0	–		24	2
CS Sfaxien	2014–15	Tunisian Ligue 1	5	0	0	0	–		0	0	–		5	0
CS Sfaxien	Total		40	2	8	1	0	0	0	0	0	0	48	3
Lorient	2014–15	Ligue 1	12	0	0	0	0	0	–		–		12	0
Lorient	2015–16	Ligue 1	34	2	5	0	1	0	–		–		40	2
Lorient	2016–17	Ligue 1	2	0	0	0	–		–		–		2	0
Lorient	Total		48	2	5	0	1	0	0	0	0	0	54	2
Sunderland	2016–17	Premier League	31	1	0	0	2	0	–		–		33	1
Sunderland	2017–18	Championship	18	0	0	0	3	0	–		–		21	0
Sunderland	Total		49	1	0	0	5	0	0	0	0	0	54	1
Watford (loan)	2017–18	Premier League	0	0	0	0	0	0	–		–		0	0
Guingamp	2018–19	Ligue 1	11	0	2	0	2	0	–		–		15	0
Guingamp	2019–20	Ligue 2	1	0	0	0	0	0	–		–		1	0
Guingamp	Total		12	0	2	0	2	0	0	0	0	0	16	1
Dijon	2019–20	Ligue 1	27	0	4	0	1	0	–		–		32	0
Dijon	2020–21	Ligue 1	29	0	0	0	–		–		–		29	0
Dijon	2022–23	Ligue 1	28	0	1	0	–		–		–		29	0
Dijon	Total		84	0	5	0	1	0	0	0	0	0	90	0
Malatyaspor (loan)	2021–22	Süper Lig	20	0	2	0	–		–		–		22	0
Al-Riyadh	2023–24	Saudi Pro League	30	1	1	1	–		–		–		31	2
Esteghlal	2024–25	Iran Pro League	28	0	4	0	–		10 (Note: Appearance(s) in AFC Champions League Elite)	0	–		42	0
Esteghlal	2025–26	Iran Pro League	10	0	1	0	–		4 (Note: Appearance in AFC Champions League Two)	0	1 (Note: Appearance in Iranian Super Cup)	0	16	0
Esteghlal	Total		38	0	5	0	0	0	14	0	1	0	58	0
Career total			331	6	28	2	9	0	14	0	1	0	383	8

=== International ===
As of match played 29 September 2026

Appearances and goals by national team and year
National team	Year	Apps	Goals
Gabon	2012	1	0
Gabon	2013	4	0
Gabon	2014	5	0
Gabon	2015	8	0
Gabon	2016	4	0
Gabon	2017	8	0
Gabon	2019	5	0
Gabon	2020	3	0
Gabon	2021	4	0
Gabon	2022	2	0
Gabon	2023	4	1
Gabon	2025	8	0
Gabon	2026	3	0
Total		59	1

Scores and results list Gabon's goal tally first, score column indicates score after each Ndong goal.

List of international goals scored by Didier Ndong
No.	Date	Venue	Opponent	Score	Result	Competition
1	9 September 2023	Cheikha Ould Boïdiya Stadium, Nouakchott, Mauritania	Mauritania	2–1	2–1	2023 Africa Cup of Nations qualification

== Honours ==
CS Sfaxien

- CLP-1: 2012–13
- CAF Confederation Cup: 2013

Guingamp

- Coupe de la Ligue runner-up: 2018–19

Gabon U23

- CAF U-23 Championship:2011

Esteghlal

- Iranian Hazfi Cup : 2024–25
