= Benjamin Moukandjo =

Cameroonian footballer (born 1988)

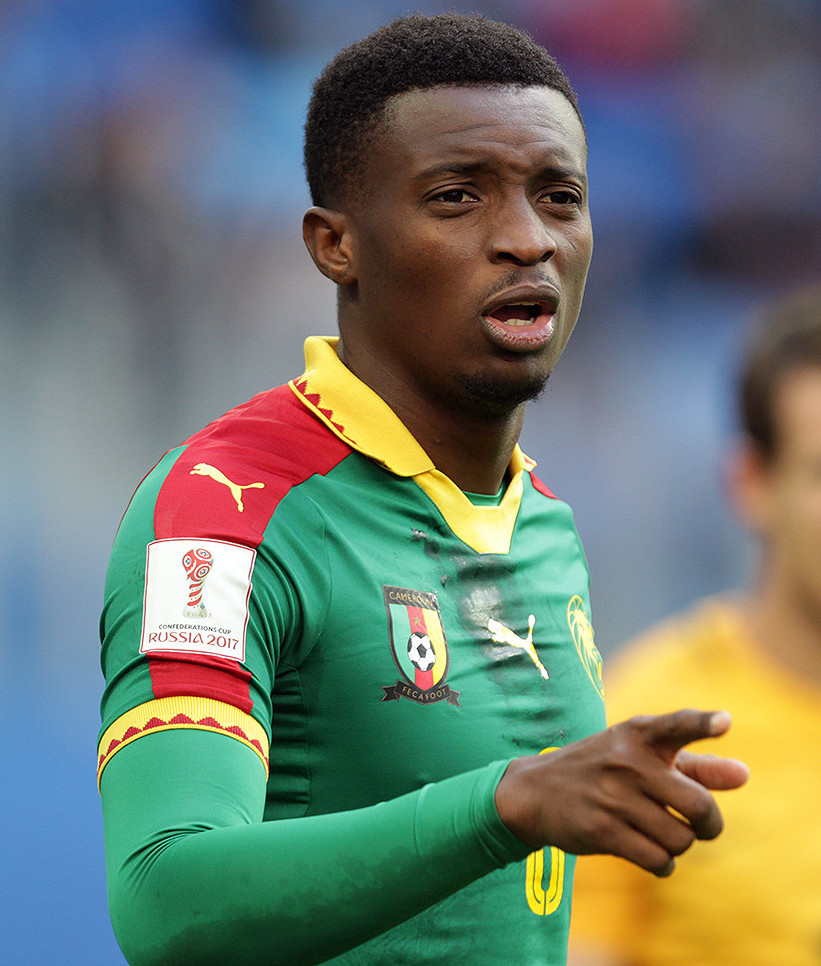
- Moukandjo with Cameroon at the 2017 FIFA Confederations Cup

Personal information
- Full name: Benjamin Moukandjo Bilé
- Date of birth: 12 November 1988 (age 37)
- Place of birth: Douala, Cameroon
- Height: 1.80 m (5 ft 11 in)
- Position: Forward

Youth career
- 1998–2006: Kadji SA

Senior career*
Years	Team	Apps	(Gls)
2007	Kadji SA	15	(12)
2007–2009	Rennes B	14	(2)
2008–2009	Rennes	0	(0)
2008–2009	→ L'Entente (loan)	11	(0)
2009–2011	Nîmes	46	(8)
2011	Monaco	16	(3)
2011–2014	Nancy	89	(19)
2014–2015	Reims	31	(8)
2015–2017	Lorient	56	(26)
2017–2018	Jiangsu Suning	10	(7)
2018	→ Beijing Renhe (loan)	18	(7)
2019–2020	Lens	4	(0)
2020–2021	Valenciennes	2	(0)
2021	AEL	10	(0)
Total		321	(92)

International career
2011–2018	Cameroon	57	(10)
Medal record
Men's football
Representing Cameroon
Africa Cup of Nations
Winner	2017 Gabon
- * Club domestic league appearances and goals

Benjamin Moukandjo Bilé (born 12 November 1988) is a Cameroonian former professional footballer who plays as a forward.

== Club career ==
Moukandjo began his career in hometown's Kadji Sports Academy, joining the club's youth setup in 1998, aged 10. Nine years later he moved to France, joining Rennes. In September 2008, after making appearances only for the reserve team of Rennes, he was loaned out to L'Entente SSG.

Moukandjo returned to Rennes in June 2009, but rescinded his link and joined Nîmes on 31 August 2009. He appeared regularly for the side in Ligue 2.

Later he moved to Monaco on 31 January 2011.

In May 2011, after Monaco's relegation to Ligue 2, Moukandjo was linked with Liverpool. He joined Nancy on 12 August 2011 by signing a three-season contract.

On 18 July 2014, Moukandjo moved to Ligue 1 side Reims on a two-year deal.

On 5 August 2015, Moukandjo joined Lorient, also of Ligue 1. On 8 April 2017, he scored two of Lorient's goals and provided an assist for Sylvain Marveaux in their 4–1 league away win over Lyon.

On 13 July 2017, Moukandjo moved to the Chinese Super League side Jiangsu Suning on a two-year deal. On 28 February 2018, Moukandjo was loaned to Beijing Renhe until 31 December 2018.

In March 2019 he left Jiangsu Suning by mutual consent.

On 11 September 2019, Moukandjo joined Ligue 2 side Lens.

On 23 January 2020, after his release with Lens, Moukandjo joined Ligue 2 rivals Valenciennes where he played just two games.

On 28 January 2021, Moukandjo signed with Greek club AEL.

== International career ==
On 4 June 2011, Moukandjo made his debut for the Cameroon national football team, starting in a 0–0 2012 Africa Cup of Nations qualification draw against Senegal. He netted his first international goal on 16 June of the following year, the winner against Guinea-Bissau.

Moukandjo was selected in Cameroon's squad for the 2014 FIFA World Cup and started in all three group matches, against Mexico, Croatia and Brazil respectively.

At the 2015 African Cup of Nations, he scored Cameroon's goal in a 1–1 draw with Guinea at the group stage.

Two years later, he was named Man of the Match in the final as Cameroon won the Africa Cup of Nations for the fifth time. He was the captain of the Cameroon national team for this tournament.

In September 2018 he retired from international duty, having scored eight goals in 57 appearances.

== Career statistics ==
=== Club ===
Appearances and goals by club, season and competition
Club	Season	League			Cup (Note: Includes Coupe de France, Greek Football Cup.)		League Cup (Note: Includes Coupe de la Ligue.)		Other		Total	
Club	Season	Division	Apps	Goals	Apps	Goals	Apps	Goals	Apps	Goals	Apps	Goals
Rennes B	2007–08	CFA	12	2	—		—		—		12	2
Rennes B	2008–09	CFA	2	0	—		—		—		2	0
Rennes B	Total		14	2	—		—		—		14	2
L'Entente	2008–09	National	11	0	—		—		—		11	0
Nîmes	2009–10	Ligue 2	31	3	2	0	1	0	—		34	3
Nîmes	2010–11	Ligue 2	15	5	3	2	2	0	—		20	7
Nîmes	Total		46	8	5	2	3	0	—		54	10
Monaco	2010–11	Ligue 1	16	3	—		—		—		16	3
Nancy	2011–12	Ligue 1	27	5	1	0	1	0	—		29	5
Nancy	2012–13	Ligue 1	35	5	3	3	1	1	—		39	9
Nancy	2013–14	Ligue 2	27	9	0	0	0	0	—		27	9
Nancy	Total		89	19	4	3	2	1	—		95	23
Reims	2014–15	Ligue 1	31	8	0	0	1	0	—		32	8
Lorient	2015–16	Ligue 1	31	13	3	0	0	0	—		34	13
Lorient	2016–17	Ligue 1	25	13	0	0	0	0	2 (Note: Appearnces in L1/L2 Playoff.)	0	27	13
Lorient	Total		56	26	3	0	0	0	2	0	61	26
Jiangsu Suning	2017	Chinese Super League	10	7	1	1	—		—		11	8
Beijing Renhe (loan)	2018	Chinese Super League	18	7	1	0	—		—		19	7
Lens	2019–20	Ligue 2	3	0	1	1	0	0	—		4	1
Valenciennes	2019–20	Ligue 2	2	0	—		—		—		2	0
AEL	2020–21	Super League Greece	10	0	1	0	—		—		11	0
Career total			306	80	16	7	6	1	2	0	330	88

=== International ===
Scores and results list Cameroon's goal tally first, score column indicates score after each Moukandjo goal.

List of international goals scored by Benjamin Moukandjo
No.	Date	Venue	Opponent	Score	Result	Competition
1	16 June 2012	Stade Ahmadou Ahidjo, Yaoundé, Cameroon	Guinea-Bissau	1–0	1–0	2013 Africa Cup of Nations qualification
2	17 November 2013	Stade Ahmadou Ahidjo, Yaoundé, Cameroon	Tunisia	2–0	4–1	2014 FIFA World Cup qualification
3	24 January 2015	Estadio de Malabo, Malabo, Equatorial Guinea	Guinea	1–0	1–1	2015 Africa Cup of Nations
4	30 March 2015	Rajamangala Stadium, Bangkok, Thailand	Thailand	1–2	3–2	Friendly
5	3 September 2016	Limbe Stadium, Limbe, Cameroon	Gambia	1–0	2–0	2017 Africa Cup of Nations qualification
6	9 October 2016	Stade Mustapha Tchaker, Blida, Algeria	Algeria	1–1	1–1	2018 FIFA World Cup qualification
7	10 January 2017	Stade Ahmadou Ahidjo, Yaoundé, Cameroon	Zimbabwe	1–1	1–1	Friendly
8	14 January 2017	Stade de l'Amitié, Libreville, Gabon	Burkina Faso	1–1	1–1	2017 Africa Cup of Nations

== Honours ==
Cameroon

- Africa Cup of Nations: 2017
