= Mouhameth Sané =

Senegalese footballer

Personal information
- Date of birth: 26 January 1996 (age 30)
- Place of birth: Dakar, Senegal
- Height: 1.96 m (6 ft 5 in)
- Position: Defender

Team information
- Current team: Mulhouse

Senior career*
Years	Team	Apps	(Gls)
2015–2016	Dijon B	20	(1)
2015–2016	Dijon	0	(0)
2016–2017	Auxerre B	19	(0)
2017–2022	Mulhouse	86	(7)
2022–2024	Biesheim	42	(3)
2024–2025	Créteil	6	(0)
2025	Sarreguemines		
2025–	Mulhouse	4	(1)

International career^{‡}
2015	Senegal U20	11	(0)
- * Club domestic league appearances and goals as of 7 February 2026 ‡ National team caps and goals as of 9:16, 28 May 2020 (UTC)

Mouhameth Sané (born 26 January 1996) is a Senegalese footballer who plays as a defender for French Championnat National 3 club Mulhouse.

== Career statistics ==
=== Club ===
As of 28 May 2020.

Club	Season	League			National Cup		League Cup		Other		Total	
Club	Season	Division	Apps	Goals	Apps	Goals	Apps	Goals	Apps	Goals	Apps	Goals
Dijon B	2014–15	Championnat de France; Amateur 2	5	0	–		–		0	0	5	0
Dijon B	2015–16	Championnat de France; Amateur 2	15	1	–		–		0	0	15	1
Dijon B	Total		20	1	0	0	0	0	0	0	20	1
Dijon	2015–16	Ligue 2	0	0	0	0	1 (Note: Appearances in the Coupe de la Ligue)	0	0	0	1	0
Auxerre B	2016–17	Championnat de France Amateur	19	0	–		–		0	0	19	0
Mulhouse	2017–18	Championnat National 3	18	1	0	0	–		0	0	18	1
Mulhouse	2018–19	Championnat National 3	20	3	0	0	–		0	0	20	3
Mulhouse	2019–20	Championnat National 2	19	0	1 (Note: Appearances in the Coupe de France)	0	–		0	0	20	1
Mulhouse	Total		57	4	1	0	0	0	0	0	58	4
Career total			96	5	1	0	1	0	0	0	98	5
