= Ali Keïta =

Ivorian footballer

Personal information
- Date of birth: 1 October 1988 (age 38)
- Place of birth: Abidjan, Ivory Coast
- Height: 1.78 m (5 ft 10 in)
- Position: Left-back

Senior career*
Years	Team	Apps	(Gls)
2010–2011	Compiègne	32	(0)
2011–2012	La Vitréenne	23	(0)
2012–2015	Avranches	63	(1)
2013–2014	→ Luçon (loan)	29	(0)
2015	Brest B	1	(0)
2015–2017	Brest	25	(0)
2017	Concarneau	17	(0)
2018–2019	Le Mans	25	(2)
2019	SC Bastia	0	(0)
2020	Martigues	4	(0)
- * Club domestic league appearances and goals as of 21:25, 22 January 2023 (UTC)

Ali Keïta (born 1 October 1988) is an Ivorian footballer who plays as a left-back.

== Career ==
He left US Concarneau in 2017, and previously made 25 appearances in Ligue 2 for Brest.

On 24 October 2019, Keïta joined Championnat National 2 club SC Bastia. One month later the club announced, that Keïta had left the club by mutual agreement. In the summer 2020, Keïta joined FC Martigues.
