= Florent Chaigneau =

French professional footballer (born 1984)

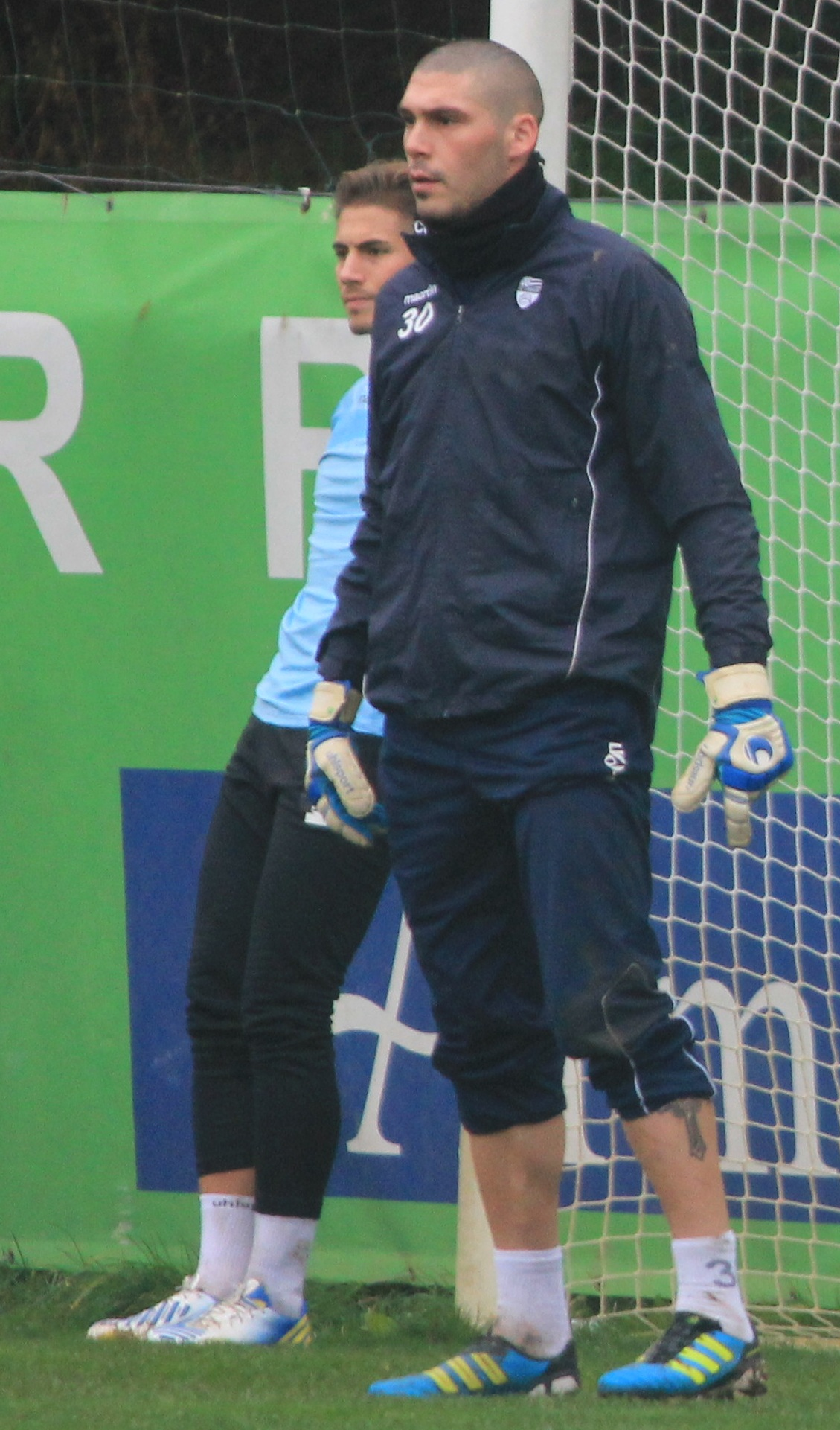

Personal information
- Full name: Florent Chaigneau
- Date of birth: 21 March 1984 (age 42)
- Place of birth: La Roche sur Yon, France
- Height: 1.97 m (6 ft 6 in)
- Position: Goalkeeper

Team information
- Current team: US Montagnarde

Senior career*
Years	Team	Apps	(Gls)
1999–2006	Stade Rennais	6	(0)
2005–2006	→ Brighton (loan)	1	(0)
2006–2007	Sporting Toulon Var		
2009–2011	Le Poiré-sur-Vie		(0)
2011–2014	Lorient B	35	(0)
2011–2016	Lorient	17	(0)
2017–	US Montagnarde	10	(0)
- * Club domestic league appearances and goals as of 20:15, 4 February 2018 (UTC)

Florent Chaigneau (born 21 March 1984) is a French professional footballer who plays as a goalkeeper for US Montagnarde.
