= Pedrinho (footballer, born 1985) =

Portuguese footballer

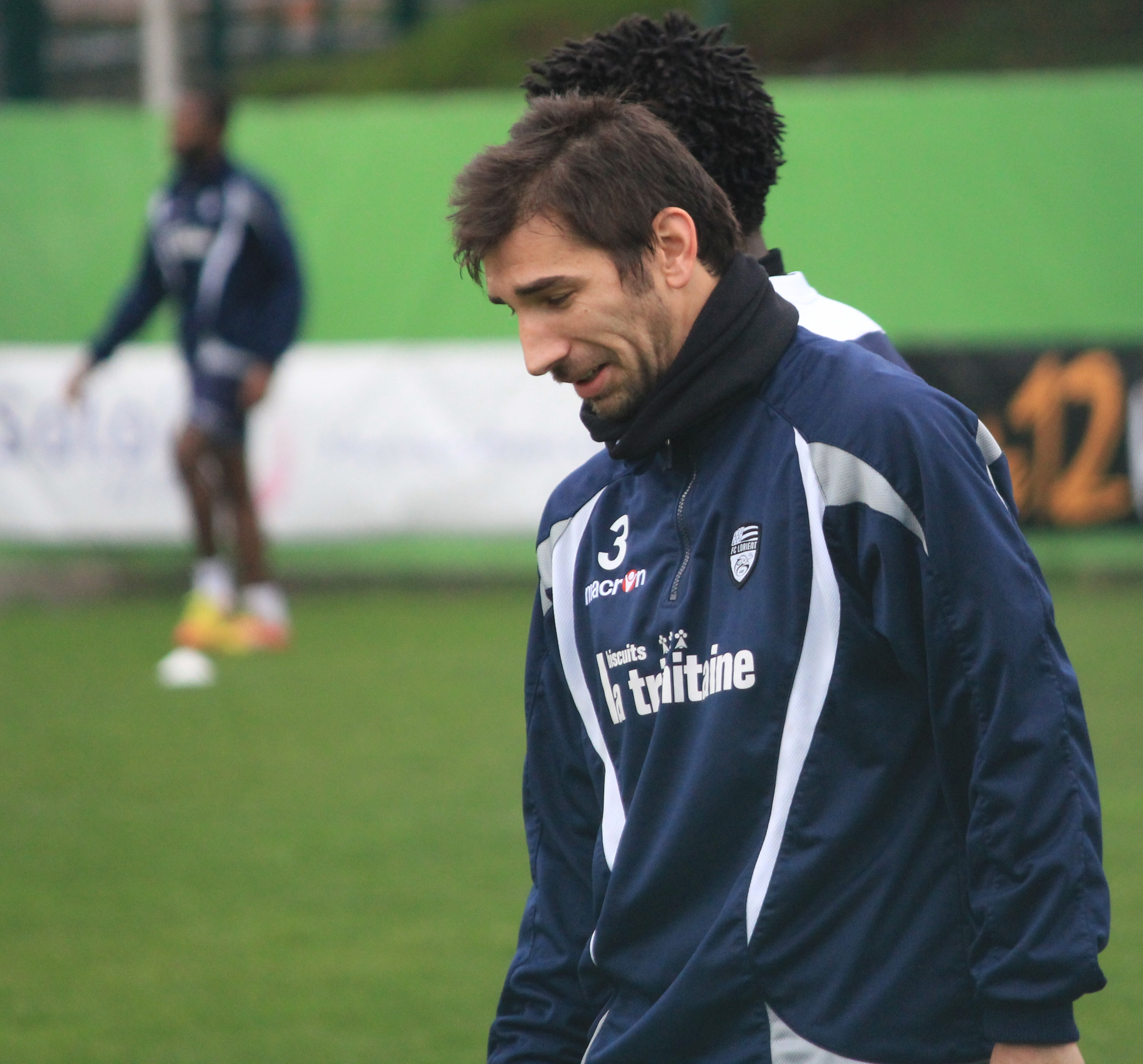
- Pedrinho training with Lorient in 2012

Personal information
- Full name: Pedro Miguel da Silva Rocha
- Date of birth: 6 March 1985 (age 41)
- Place of birth: Póvoa de Varzim, Portugal
- Height: 1.75 m (5 ft 9 in)
- Position: Right-back

Youth career
- 1996–2004: Varzim

Senior career*
Years	Team	Apps	(Gls)
2004–2007	Varzim	72	(9)
2007–2011	Académica	85	(1)
2007	→ Varzim (loan)	14	(0)
2011–2015	Lorient	31	(1)
2012–2015	Lorient B	24	(1)
2015–2017	Rio Ave	27	(0)
2017–2019	Aves	6	(0)
2019–2020	Leixões	7	(0)
Total		266	(12)
- * Club domestic league appearances and goals

Pedro Miguel da Silva Rocha (born 6 March 1985 in Póvoa de Varzim, Porto District), known as Pedrinho, is a Portuguese former professional footballer who played as a right-back.

== Honours ==
Aves

- Taça de Portugal: 2017–18
