= Pierre Lavenant =

French footballer (born 1995)

Personal information
- Full name: Pierre Lavenant
- Date of birth: 3 August 1995 (age 31)
- Place of birth: Saint-Malo, France
- Height: 1.75 m (5 ft 9 in)
- Position: Attacking midfielder

Team information
- Current team: Les Herbiers
- Number: 7

Youth career
- 2001–2011: Saint-Malo
- 2011–2014: Lorient

Senior career*
Years	Team	Apps	(Gls)
2013–2017	Lorient B	54	(7)
2014–2017	Lorient	0	(0)
2015–2016	→ Sedan (loan)	21	(1)
2016–2017	→ Avranches (loan)	29	(4)
2016–2017	→ Avranches II (loan)	3	(1)
2018–2020	Vannes	35	(4)
2020–2022	Francs Borains	11	(0)
2022–	Les Herbiers	98	(7)

International career
2013	France U18	1	(0)
2013	France U19	2	(0)
- * Club domestic league appearances and goals as of 4 December 2025

Pierre Lavenant (born 3 August 1995) is a French professional footballer who plays as an attacking midfielder for Championnat National 1 club Les Herbiers.

== Club career ==
Lavenant began playing football with hometown side Saint-Malo in 2001, and spent 10 years there before joining the Lorient academy in July 2011.

Lavenant made his professional debut for Lorient on 29 October 2013, playing all 90 minutes in a 2–0 Coupe de la Ligue defeat at the hands of Nantes in the third round. On 8 January 2014, he signed his first professional contract with Lorient, committing himself to the club for three seasons.

Ahead of the 2020–21 season, Lavenant moved to Belgian National Division 1 club Francs Borains. In January 2022, he signed for French club Les Herbiers.

== International career ==
Lavenant has represented France at under-18 and under-19 level.

=== International ===
As of 11 November 2013.

National team	Season	Apps	Goals
France U18	2012–13	1	0
France U19	2013–14	2	0
Total		3	0
