= François Bellugou =

French footballer (born 1987)

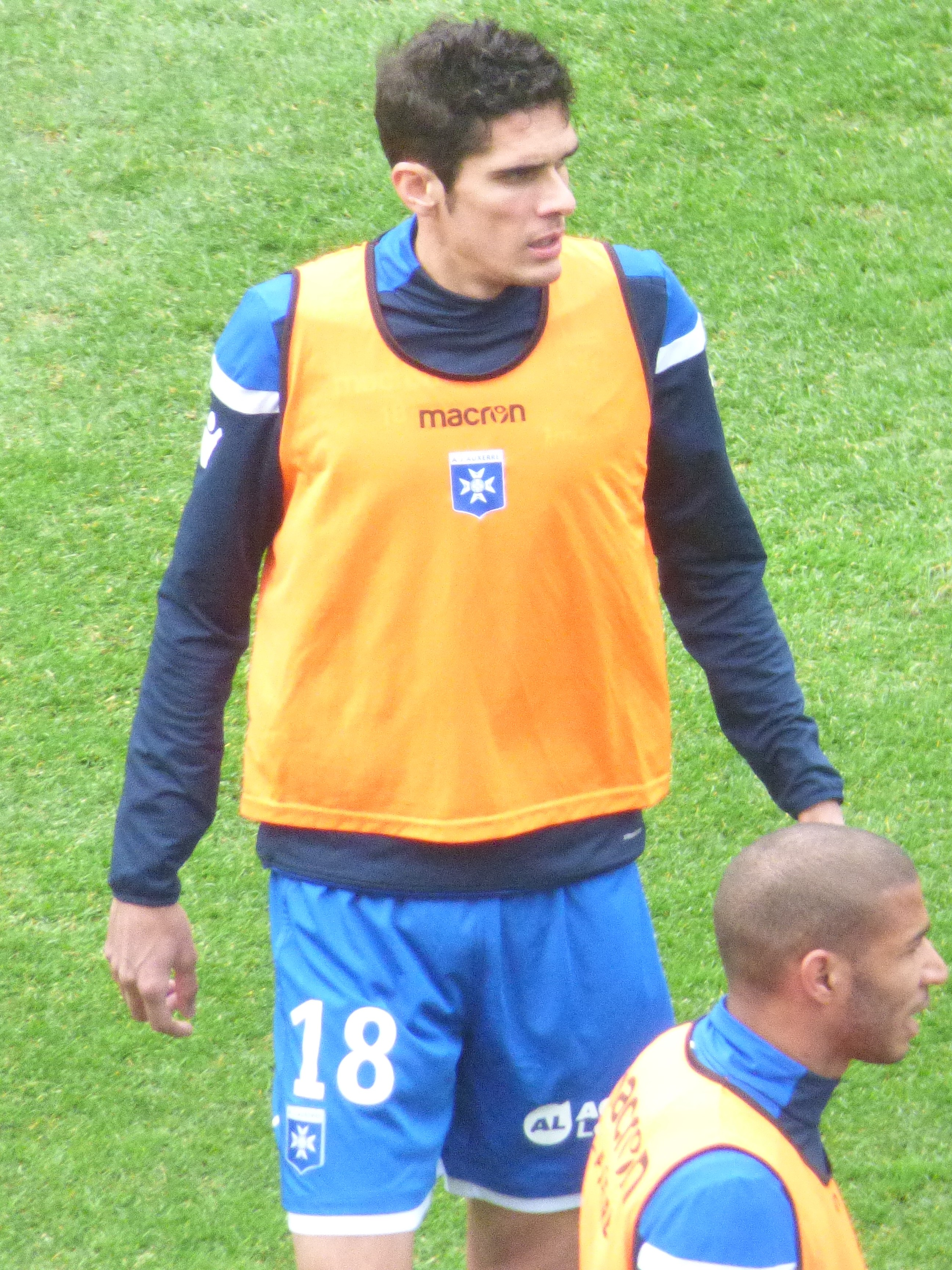
- Bellugou in 2019

Personal information
- Date of birth: 25 April 1987 (age 39)
- Place of birth: Prades, France
- Height: 1.87 m (6 ft 2 in)
- Position: Midfielder

Senior career*
Years	Team	Apps	(Gls)
2004–2007	Montpellier B		
2006–2007	Montpellier	1	(0)
2007–2008	Sète		
2008–2013	Guingamp	115	(1)
2013–2014	Nancy	42	(1)
2014–2017	Lorient	79	(2)
2017–2018	Troyes	30	(0)
2018–2021	Auxerre	68	(0)
- * Club domestic league appearances and goals as of 11:46, 13 August 2021 (UTC)

François Bellugou (born 25 April 1987) is a French professional footballer who most recently played for AJ Auxerre as a midfielder.

== Honours ==
Guingamp

- Coupe de France: 2009
