= Benjamin Jeannot =

French footballer (born 1992)

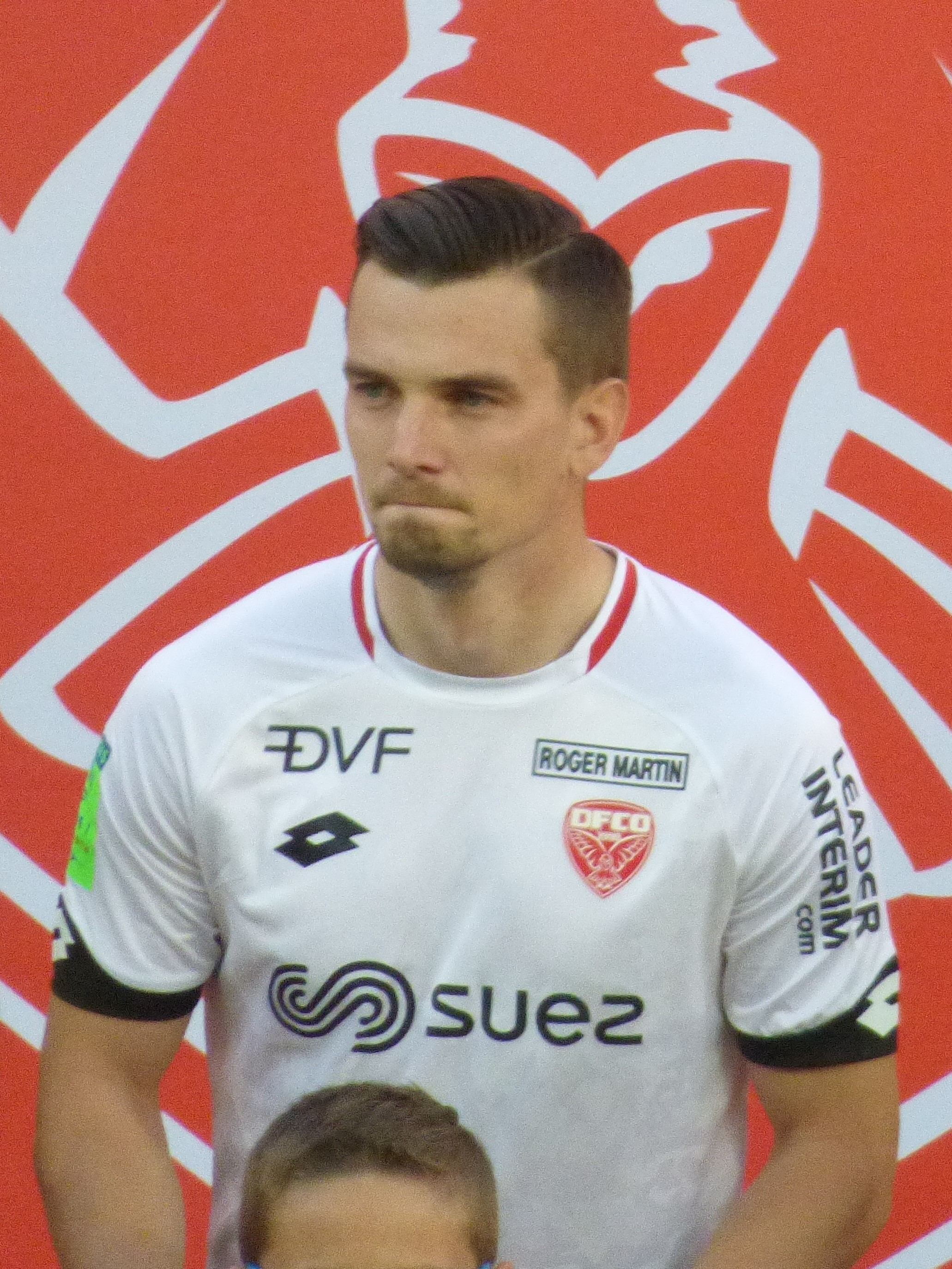

Personal information
- Full name: Benjamin Jeannot
- Date of birth: 22 January 1992 (age 34)
- Place of birth: Laxou, France
- Height: 1.83 m (6 ft 0 in)
- Position: Striker

Youth career
- 1998–2002: Dommartin-les-Toul
- 2002–2011: Nancy

Senior career*
Years	Team	Apps	(Gls)
2010–2013	Nancy B	24	(18)
2011–2014	Nancy	46	(6)
2012–2013	→ Châteauroux (loan)	37	(10)
2014–2017	Lorient	77	(14)
2016	Lorient B	1	(0)
2017–2019	Dijon	47	(6)
2019	Dijon B	1	(2)
2019–2023	Caen	82	(10)
2021–2023	Caen B	6	(1)

International career^{‡}
2007–2008	France U16	7	(0)
2008–2009	France U17	10	(1)
2009–2010	France U18	6	(1)
2011	France U19	3	(0)
2011	France U21	1	(0)
- * Club domestic league appearances and goals as of 24 June 2023 ‡ National team caps and goals as of 26 August 2011

Benjamin Jeannot (French: [bɛ̃ʒamɛ̃ ʒano]; born 22 January 1992) is a French former professional footballer who lastly played as a striker for Ligue 2 club Caen.

A French youth international, Jeannot starred for his nation at under-16, under-17, and under-18 level. With the under-17 team, Jeannot played at the 2009 UEFA European Under-17 Football Championship in Germany.

== Career ==
=== Early career ===
Jeannot began his career with local club AS Dommartin-les-Toul in September 1999. In June 2002, he joined professional club AS Nancy. While in the club's youth academy, Jeannot scored 594 goals in various youth team sections.

=== Professional career ===
In July 2009, Jeannot signed his first professional contract agreeing to a three-year deal with Nancy until June 2012. The contract made Jeannot the youngest professional football player in the club's history. He was, subsequently, promoted to the club reserve team in the Championnat de France amateur, the fourth level of French football. Jeannot appeared in 16 matches with the team scoring only one goal. In the 2010–11 season, he started the season with the reserve team again. After promising performances with the team, which included scoring all four goals in a victory over Lyon Duchère, Jeannot was called up to the senior team by manager Pablo Correa in February 2011. He made his professional debut on 12 February in the club's 3–1 win over Auxerre appearing as a substitute. Two weeks later, Jeannot appeared as a substitute in the team's 2–1 defeat to Marseille. On 11 March 2011, Jeannot signed a three-year contract extension with Nancy until June 2015. After signing the extension, he was permanently promoted to the first-team by manager Pablo Correa and assigned the number 10 shirt.

In 2012 July, he was loaned to Châteauroux, in Ligue 2.

== International career ==
Jeannot is a French youth international having starred for his nation at under-16, under-17, and under-18 level. He made his youth international debut at under-16 level on 4 December 2007 appearing as a substitute in a 3–0 victory over the Republic of Ireland. Jeannot appeared in six of the team's remaining seven matches as he failed to score a goal. At under-17 level, he made his debut with the team on 24 August 2008 in a 2–1 win over Slovakia in a tournament held in Austria. Jeannot scored his first youth international goal on 6 November in a 2–0 win over the United States. As a result of his performances with the team, he was named to the squad to participate in the 2009 UEFA European Under-17 Football Championship. Jeannot started all three group stage matches as France crashed out of the competition in the group stage portion. At under-18 level, he appeared in six matches. Jeannot made his debut with the team at the Sendai Cup in Japan appearing in all three group stage matches. After missing two call-ups, he returned to the team to participate in the 2010 edition of the Copa del Atlántico, a yearly youth international competition held on the Canary Islands in Spain. In the opening group stage match against the hosts, Jeannot scored the equalizing goal in the team's 2–2 draw.

== Career statistics ==
=== Club ===
As of 18 July 2018

Appearances and goals by club, season and competition
Club	Season	League		Cup (Note: Includes Coupe de France, Coupe de la Ligue, Trophée des Champions)		Play-offs		Total	
Club	Season	Apps	Goals	Apps	Goals	Apps	Goals	Apps	Goals
Nancy	2010–11	9	0	0	0	0	0	9	0
Nancy	2011–12	6	0	1	0	0	0	7	0
Nancy	2013–14	31	6	4	0	0	0	35	6
Nancy	Total	46	6	5	0	0	0	51	6
Châteauroux (loan)	2012–13	37	10	4	0	0	0	41	10
Lorient	2014–15	31	7	2	0	0	0	33	7
Lorient	2015–16	29	7	8	7	0	0	37	14
Lorient	2016–17	17	0	2	1	1	0	20	1
Lorient	Total	77	14	12	8	1	0	90	22
Dijon	2017–18	24	4	1	0	1	0	26	4
Career total		184	34	22	8	2	0	208	42
