= Yoann Wachter =

Gabonese footballer (born 1992)

Personal information
- Date of birth: 7 April 1992 (age 34)
- Place of birth: Courbevoie, France
- Height: 1.77 m (5 ft 10 in)
- Position: Centre back

Team information
- Current team: St-Pryvé St-Hilaire
- Number: 12

Youth career
- 2009–2011: Strasbourg
- 2011–2014: Lorient

Senior career*
Years	Team	Apps	(Gls)
2011–2015	Lorient B	80	(0)
2014–2017	Lorient	8	(0)
2015–2016	→ Sedan (loan)	22	(0)
2016–2017	→ Sedan (loan)	26	(0)
2018–2019	Limoges	21	(0)
2019–2021	Saint-Malo	27	(1)
2021–2022	Bergerac	20	(0)
2022–	St-Pryvé St-Hilaire	47	(0)

International career
2016–	Gabon	4	(0)
- * Club domestic league appearances and goals as of 30 November 2024

Yoann Wachter (born 7 April 1992) is a professional footballer who plays as a midfielder for French Championnat National 1 club St-Pryvé St-Hilaire. Born in France, he plays for the Gabon national team.

== Club career ==
Wachter is a youth exponent from Lorient. He made his Ligue 1 debut on 10 August 2014 against AS Monaco.

== International career ==
Wacther was born in metropolitan France to a Gabonese father, and a Guadeloupean mother. Wachter received a callup to the Gabon national football team for a match against Mauritania on 28 May 2016. He made his debut in a 1–1 tie with Comoros on 15 November 2016.

== Career statistics ==
Club	Division	Season	League		Cup		League Cup		Total	
Club	Division	Season	Apps	Goals	Apps	Goals	Apps	Goals	Apps	Goals
Lorient	Ligue 1	2013–14	0	0	1	0	0	0	1	0
Lorient	Ligue 1	2014–15	8	0	1	0	2	0	11	0
Sedan (loan)	National	2015–16	22	0	5	1	0	0	27	1
Career totals			30	0	7	1	2	0	39	1
