= Rafidine Abdullah =

Footballer (born 1994)

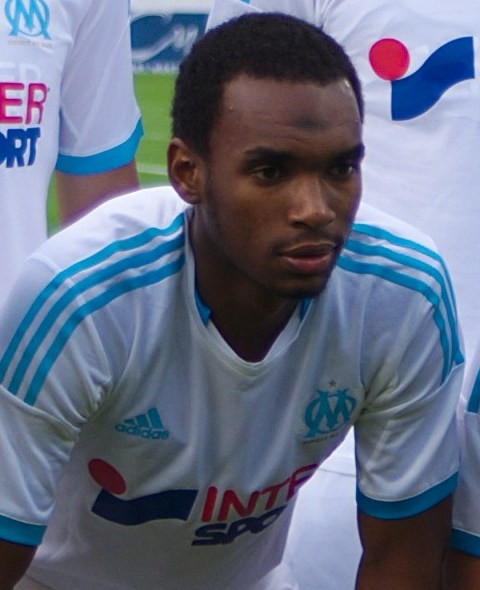
- Abdullah with Marseille in 2013

Personal information
- Full name: Rafidine Abdullah
- Date of birth: 15 January 1994 (age 32)
- Place of birth: Marseille, France
- Height: 1.79 m (5 ft 10 in)
- Position: Midfielder

Team information
- Current team: Velež Mostar
- Number: 6

Youth career
- 2009–2012: Marseille

Senior career*
Years	Team	Apps	(Gls)
2011–2013	Marseille B	23	(1)
2012–2013	Marseille	15	(0)
2013–2016	Lorient	45	(1)
2013–2015	Lorient B	6	(0)
2016–2018	Cádiz	66	(3)
2018–2019	Waasland-Beveren	10	(0)
2020–2022	Stade Lausanne	59	(5)
2024	Servette U21	15	(0)
2025	Wohlen	10	(0)
2025–	Velež Mostar	28	(0)

International career
2012	France U18	4	(0)
2012	France U19	3	(0)
2013–2014	France U20	7	(1)
2016–2024	Comoros	20	(0)
- * Club domestic league appearances and goals as of 13 September 2026

Rafidine Abdullah (born 15 January 1994) is a footballer who plays as a midfielder for Bosnian Premier League club Velež Mostar. Born in France, he played for the Comoros national team.

== Club career ==
=== Marseille ===
After training with the senior team during the 2011–12 season under former manager Didier Deschamps, ahead of the ensuing season under new manager Élie Baup, Abdullah was promoted to the senior team permanently and assigned the number 13 shirt. He made his professional debut on 9 August 2012 in the second leg of the team's third qualifying round tie against Turkish club Eskişehirspor.

=== Cádiz ===
On 3 August 2016, Abdullah moved abroad for the first time in his career, signing a two-year contract with Spanish Segunda División club Cádiz CF.

=== Waasland-Beveren ===
On 17 July 2018, Waasland-Beveren announced, that they had signed Abdullah on a two-year contract. After playing only 644 minutes in ten games, Abdullah and the club decided to terminate the contract by mutual consent on 28 January 2019. Abdullah's contract expired after Waasland-Beveren declined to renew following the end of the 2021–22 Swiss Challenge League.

== International career ==
Abdullah was born in France to Comorian parents. A French youth international having represented his nation at under-18 level. He switched to the Comoros national team and made his debut for them in a 2–2 friendly tie with Togo.

== Career statistics ==
=== Club ===
As of match played 13 September 2026

Appearances and goals by club, season and competition
Club	Season	League			National cup (Note: Includes Coupe de France, Copa del Rey, Swiss Cup, Bosnian Cup)		League cup (Note: Includes Coupe de la Ligue)		Continental		Other		Total	
Club	Season	Division	Apps	Goals	Apps	Goals	Apps	Goals	Apps	Goals	Apps	Goals	Apps	Goals
Marseille B	2011–12	CFA	16	0	—		—		—		—		16	0
Marseille B	2012–13	CFA	6	1	—		—		—		—		6	1
Marseille B	2013–14	CFA	1	0	—		—		—		—		1	0
Marseille B	Total		23	1	—		—		—		—		23	1
Marseille	2012–13	Ligue 1	15	0	1	0	1	0	6 (Note: Appearances in UEFA Europa League)	0	—		23	0
Lorient	2013–14	Ligue 1	10	0	—		1	0	—		—		11	0
Lorient	2014–15	Ligue 1	23	0	1	0	1	0	—		—		25	0
Lorient	2015–16	Ligue 1	12	1	2	0	1	0	—		—		15	1
Lorient	Total		45	1	3	0	3	0	—		—		51	1
Lorient B	2013–14	CFA	5	0	—		—		—		—		5	0
Lorient B	2015–16	CFA	1	0	—		—		—		—		1	0
Lorient B	Total		6	0	—		—		—		—		6	0
Cádiz	2016–17	Segunda División	35	3	2	0	—		—		2 (Note: Appearances in the 2017 Segunda División play-offs)	0	39	3
Cádiz	2017–18	Segunda División	31	0	4	0	—		—		—		35	0
Cádiz	Total		66	3	6	0	—		—		2	0	74	3
Waasland-Beveren	2018–19	Belgian First Division A	10	0	—		—		—		—		10	0
Stade Lausanne Ouchy	2019–20	Swiss Challenge League	8	1	—		—		—		—		8	1
Stade Lausanne Ouchy	2020–21	Swiss Challenge League	28	2	—		—		—		—		28	2
Stade Lausanne Ouchy	2021–22	Swiss Challenge League	23	2	1	0	—		—		—		24	2
Stade Lausanne Ouchy	Total		59	5	1	0	—		—		—		60	5
Servette FC U21	2023–24	Promotion League	15	0	—		—		—		—		15	0
Wohlen	2024–25	1. Liga Classic	10	0	1	0	—		—		—		11	0
Velež Mostar	2025–26	Bosnian Premier League	23	0	6	0	—		—		—		29	0
Velež Mostar	2026–27	Bosnian Premier League	5	0	—		—		4 (Note: Appearances in UEFA Conference League)	0	—		9	0
Velež Mostar	Total		28	0	6	0	—		4	0	—		38	0
Career total			277	10	18	0	4	0	10	0	2	0	311	10

=== International ===
As of match played 7 June 2024

Appearances and goals by national team and year
National team	Year	Apps	Goals
Comoros	2016	2	0
Comoros	2017	1	0
Comoros	2018	4	0
Comoros	2019	1	0
Comoros	2020	2	0
Comoros	2021	3	0
Comoros	2022	6	0
Comoros	2023	0	0
Comoros	2024	1	0
Total		20	0
