= 2014–15 FC Metz season =

Metz
2014–15 season
- Chairman: Bernard Serin
- Manager: Albert Cartier
- Stadium: Stade Saint-Symphorien
- Ligue 1: 19th (Relegated)
- Coupe de France: Round of 16 vs. Stade Brest
- Coupe de la Ligue: Round of 16 vs. Nantes
- Top goalscorer: Modibo Maïga (9)
- Highest home attendance: 25,012 vs Paris Saint-Germain (21 November 2014)
- Lowest home attendance: 6,078 vs Stade Brest (12 February 2015)
- Average home league attendance: 18,562
Home colours	Away colours	Third colours

The 2014–15 FC Metz season is the 82nd professional season of the club since its creation in 1932. After finishing 1st in Ligue 2 during the 2013–14 season, it is their first return to Ligue 1 since their relegation after the 2007-08 season.

== Players ==
=== First team squad ===
French teams are limited to four players without EU citizenship. Hence, the squad list includes only the principal nationality of each player; several non-European players on the squad have dual citizenship with an EU country. Also, players from the ACP countries—countries in Africa, the Caribbean, and the Pacific that are signatories to the Cotonou Agreement—are not counted against non-EU quotas due to the Kolpak ruling.

Note: Flags indicate national team as defined under FIFA eligibility rules; some limited exceptions apply. Players may hold more than one non-FIFA nationality.

No.	Pos.	Nation	Player
1	GK	FRA	Johann Carrasso
3	DF	FRA	Jonathan Rivierez
4	DF	FRA	Sylvain Marchal
5	DF	ARG	Guido Milán
6	MF	TUN	Ferjani Sassi
7	MF	FRA	Romain Rocchi
8	MF	CIV	Cheick Doukouré
9	FW	VEN	Juan Manuel Falcón
10	MF	GUI	Bouna Sarr
11	FW	ARG	Federico Andrada (on loan from River Plate)
12	FW	GHA	Kwame Nsor
13	MF	FRA	Florent Malouda
14	MF	BFA	Fadil Sido
15	DF	FRA	Romain Métanire
16	GK	GAB	Anthony Mfa Mezui

No.	Pos.	Nation	Player
17	FW	TUN	Fakhreddine Ben Youssef
18	DF	FRA	Jérémy Choplin
19	FW	FRA	Thibaut Vion
20	FW	MLI	Modibo Maïga (on loan from West Ham)
21	MF	ALG	Ahmed Kashi
22	MF	FRA	Kevin Lejeune
23	MF	FRA	Yeni Ngbakoto
24	DF	FRA	Gaëtan Bussmann
25	MF	SEN	Guirane N'Daw
26	DF	LUX	Chris Philipps
27	DF	ARG	José Luis Palomino
28	MF	LAT	Jānis Ikaunieks
29	MF	BLR	Sergey Krivets
30	GK	FRA	David Oberhauser

=== Out on loan ===
Note: Flags indicate national team as defined under FIFA eligibility rules; some limited exceptions apply. Players may hold more than one non-FIFA nationality.

No.	Pos.	Nation	Player
—	GK	FRA	Thomas Didillon (on loan to Seraing United)
—	DF	FRA	Médéric Deher (on loan to Luçon)
—	DF	SEN	Abdallah Ndour (on loan to Strasbourg)
—	DF	CIV	Ali Bamba (on loan to Seraing United)

No.	Pos.	Nation	Player
—	MF	FRA	Samy Kehli (on loan to Seraing United)
—	MF	NGR	Popoola Saliu (on loan to Seraing United)
—	MF	SEN	Mayoro N'Doye-Baye (on loan to Strasbourg)
—	FW	SEN	Moussa Gueye (on loan to Seraing United)

== Competitions ==
=== Ligue 1 ===
==== League table ====
Pos	Team	Pld	W	D	L	GF	GA	GD	Pts	Qualification or relegation
16	Lorient	38	12	7	19	44	50	−6	43	
17	Toulouse	38	12	6	20	43	64	−21	42	
18	Evian (R)	38	11	4	23	41	62	−21	37	Relegation to Ligue 2
19	Metz (R)	38	7	9	22	31	61	−30	30	Relegation to Ligue 2
20	Lens (Note: It was announced on 29 January 2015 that Lens' promotion from Ligue 2 at the end of the 2013–14 season has been ruled invalid, and will thus be automatically relegated to Ligue 2 for the 2015–16 season, regardless of where the team place this season. It has been confirmed by the French Football Federation that the decision of the Administrative Court of Besançon will be appealed.) (D, R)	38	7	8	23	32	61	−29	29	Relegation to Ligue 2

Source: Ligue 1
Rules for classification: 1) points; 2) goal difference; 3) number of goals scored
(D) Disqualified; (R) Relegated

==== Results summary ====
Overall								Home						Away					
Pld	W	D	L	GF	GA	GD	Pts	W	D	L	GF	GA	GD	W	D	L	GF	GA	GD
38	7	9	22	31	61	−30	30	6	4	9	26	32	−6	1	5	13	5	29	−24

Last updated: 11 June 2015.
Source: Competitive matches

==== Results by round ====
Round	1	2	3	4	5	6	7	8	9	10	11	12	13	14	15	16	17	18	19	20	21	22	23	24	25	26	27	28	29	30	31	32	33	34	35	36	37	38
Ground	A	H	A	H	A	H	A	H	A	H	A	H	A	H	A	H	A	A	H	A	H	A	H	A	H	A	H	A	H	A	H	H	A	A	H	H	A	H
Result	D	D	L	W	L	W	W	W	L	D	L	W	L	L	L	D	L	L	L	D	L	L	D	L	L	D	L	L	L	D	W	L	W	D	L	L	L	L
Position	13	14	18	14	17	9	6	5	9	7	10	8	9	13	13	13	14	16	17	17	17	20	20	20	20	20	20	20	20	20	19	20	19	19	19	19	19	19

A = Away; H = Home; W = Win; D = Draw; L = Loss
Notes: Match 32 versus Paris Saint-Germain was postponed until 28 April 2015 and therefore should appear between matches 34 & 35.

==== Matches ====
Win Draw Loss

9 August 2014 1	Lille	0–0	Metz	Villeneuve-d'Ascq
21:00 CEST (UTC+02:00)		Report	N'Daw (yellow card) 37'	Stadium: Stade Pierre-Mauroy; Attendance: 34,327; Referee: Fredy Fautrel

16 August 2014 2	Metz	1–1	Nantes	Metz
20:00 CEST (UTC+02:00)	Ngbakoto 12' (pen.); Sarr (yellow card) 14'; Rocchi (yellow card) 32'	Report	Veretout 2'; Gakpé (yellow card) 77'	Stadium: Stade Saint-Symphorien; Attendance: 20,335; Referee: Alexandre Castro

23 August 2014 3	Montpellier	2–0	Metz	Montpellier
20:00 CEST (UTC+02:00)	Tiéné 44'; Camara 89'	Report	Milán (yellow card) 54'; Ngbakoto (yellow card) 59'	Stadium: Stade de la Mosson; Attendance: 12,337; Referee: Antony Gautier

31 August 2014 4	Metz	2–1	Lyon	Metz
17:00 CEST (UTC+02:00)	N'Daw (yellow card) 46'; Ngbakoto 82'; Falcón 86'	Report	Lacazette 68'	Stadium: Stade Saint-Symphorien; Attendance: 20,173; Referee: Fredy Fautrel

13 September 2014 5	Nice	1–0	Metz	Nice
20:00 CEST (UTC+02:00)	Hult (yellow card) 83'; Bosetti 90+4'	Report	Lejeune (yellow card) 17'; Maïga (yellow card) 70'	Stadium: Allianz Riviera; Attendance: 18,019; Referee: Tony Chapron

20 September 2014 6	Metz	3–1	Bastia	Metz
20:00 CEST (UTC+02:00)	Métanire (yellow card) 7'; Krivets 14'; Milán 64'; Falcón 74'	Report	Ayité 42'; Modesto (yellow card) 81'	Stadium: Stade Saint-Symphorien; Attendance: 18,605; Referee: Sébastien Desiage

24 September 2014 7	Guingamp	0–1	Metz	Guingamp
19:00 CEST (UTC+02:00)	Diallo (yellow card) 90+2'	Report	Bussmann 24'; N'Daw (yellow card) 37'; Ngbakoto (yellow card) 61' (yellow-red card) 89'; Métanire (yellow card) 86'	Stadium: Stade du Roudourou; Attendance: 12,712; Referee: Stéphane Lannoy

27 September 2014 8	Metz	3–0	Reims	Metz
20:00 CEST (UTC+02:00)	Falcón 50', 90+2'; Kashi 70'	Report	Mavinga (yellow card) 57' (yellow-red card) 65'; Conte (yellow card) 75'; Albæk (red card) 87'	Stadium: Stade Saint-Symphorien; Attendance: 18,273; Referee: Olivier Thual

4 October 2014 9	Evian	3–0	Metz	Annecy
20:00 CEST (UTC+02:00)	Camus (yellow card) 41'; Doukouré 62' (o.g.); Wass 75' (pen.); Bruno 81'; N'Sikulu (yellow card) 85'	Report	Kashi (yellow card) 5'; Métanire (yellow card) 22'; Doukouré (yellow card) 61'; Mfa Mezui (yellow card) 74'; Sarr (yellow card) 88'	Stadium: Parc des Sports; Attendance: 10,942; Referee: Lionel Jaffredo

18 October 2014 10	Metz	0–0	Rennes	Metz
20:00 CEST (UTC+02:00)	Milán (yellow card) 12'; Sarr (yellow card) 66'	Report		Stadium: Stade Saint-Symphorien; Attendance: 18,074; Referee: Mikael Lesage

26 October 2014 11	Saint-Étienne	1–0	Metz	Saint-Étienne
17:00 CEST (UTC+02:00)	Cohade (yellow card) 49'; Gradel 74'	Report	Bussmann (yellow card) 17'; N'Daw (yellow card) 43'	Stadium: Stade Geoffroy-Guichard; Attendance: 33,991; Referee: Sébastien Moreira

1 November 2014 12	Metz	3–2	Caen	Metz
20:00 CET (UTC+01:00)	Maïga 10', 50'; Choplin (yellow card) 57'; Lejeune (yellow card) 64'; Malouda 90' (pen.)	Report	Calvé 65'; Koita 83'; Yahia (red card) 88'	Stadium: Stade Saint-Symphorien; Attendance: 17,864; Referee: Nicolas Rainville

8 November 2014 13	Toulouse	3–0	Metz	Toulouse
20:00 CET (UTC+01:00)	Sirieix 3', (yellow card) 54'; Ben Yedder 61'; Pešić 71'	Report	Vion (yellow card) 15'	Stadium: Stadium Municipal; Attendance: 16,412; Referee: Frank Schneider

21 November 2014 14	Metz	2–3	Paris Saint-Germain	Metz
21:00 CET (UTC+01:00)	Choplin (yellow card) 29'; Maïga 49' (pen.), 53' (pen.), (yellow card) 60'; Milán (yellow card) 72'; N'Daw (yellow card) 75'	Report	Pastore 9'; Bussmann 16' (o.g.); Lavezzi 84', (yellow card) 87'	Stadium: Stade Municipal Saint-Symphorien; Attendance: 25,012; Referee: Fredy Fautrel

29 November 2014 15	Lens	2–0	Metz	Amiens
20:00 CET (UTC+01:00)	Kantari (yellow card) 41'; El Jadeyaoui 65'; Bourigeaud 79'	Report	Kashi (yellow card) 40'; Malouda (yellow card) 44'; Maïga (yellow card) 59'	Stadium: Stade de la Licorne; Attendance: 8,922; Referee: Philippe Kalt

3 December 2014 16	Metz	0–0	Bordeaux	Metz
19:00 CET (UTC+01:00)	Lejeune (yellow card) 21'; Métanire (yellow card) 33'; Falcón (yellow card) 36'	Report	Carrasso (yellow card) 87'; Khazri (yellow card) 89'	Stadium: Stade Saint-Symphorien; Attendance: 17,866; Referee: Sébastien Moreira

7 December 2014 17	Marseille	3–1	Metz	Marseille
21:00 CET (UTC+01:00)	Gignac 43'; Ayew 59'; Payet 90+2'	Report	Malouda 46'; N'Daw (yellow card) 87'	Stadium: Stade Vélodrome; Attendance: 45,537; Referee: Wilfried Bien

13 December 2014 18	Lorient	3–1	Metz	Lorient
20:00 CET (UTC+01:00)	Ayew 13'; Guerreiro 37'; Jeannot 45'; Koné (yellow card) 58'	Report	Malouda (yellow card) 42'; Ngbakoto 46'	Stadium: Stade du Moustoir; Attendance: 11,507; Referee: Mikael Lesage

20 December 2014 19	Metz	0–1	Monaco	Metz
20:00 CET (UTC+01:00)	Doukouré (yellow card) 12'; Marchal (yellow card) 15'; Malouda (yellow card) 89'	Report	Moutinho (yellow card) 61'; Carrasco 79'	Stadium: Stade Municipal Saint-Symphorien; Attendance: 18,354; Referee: Lionel Jaffredo

11 January 2015 20	Nantes	0–0	Metz	Nantes
17:00 CET (UTC+01:00)	Bammou (yellow card) 90'	Report	Carrasso (yellow card) 72'; N'Daw (yellow card) 88'; Milán (yellow card) 90'	Stadium: Stade de la Beaujoire; Attendance: 28,090; Referee: Bartolomeu Varela

17 January 2015 21	Metz	2–3	Montpellier	Metz
20:00 CET (UTC+01:00)	Ngbakoto 20' (pen.); Bussmann 38'	Report	Barrios 17' (pen.), 53', 69'; Dabo (yellow card) 17'	Stadium: Stade Saint-Symphorien; Attendance: 16,786; Referee: Alexandre Castro

25 January 2015 22	Lyon	2–0	Metz	Lyon
14:00 CET (UTC+01:00)	Lacazette 31' (pen.); Umtiti (yellow card) 45'; Dabo (yellow card) 53'; Tolisso 83'	Report	Milán (red card) 29'; Sarr (yellow card) 49'; Rivierez (yellow card) 51'	Stadium: Stade de Gerland; Attendance: 36,580; Referee: Olivier Thual

31 January 2015 23	Metz	0–0	Nice	Metz
20:00 CET (UTC+01:00)	Sarr (yellow card) 12'; N'Daw (yellow card) 28'	Report	Puel (yellow card) 19'; Maupay (red card) 73'	Stadium: Stade Municipal Saint-Symphorien; Attendance: 15,115; Referee: Mikael Lesage

7 February 2015 24	Bastia	2–0	Metz	Bastia
20:00 CET (UTC+01:00)	Modesto (yellow card) 45'; Kamano 65'; Boudebouz 79' (pen.)	Report	N'Daw (yellow card) 3'; Milán (yellow card) 38' (yellow-red card) 50'; Palomino (yellow card) 45'; Marchal (yellow card) 79'	Stadium: Stade Armand Cesari; Attendance: 11,399; Referee: Stéphane Lannoy

15 February 2015 25	Metz	0–2	Guingamp	Metz
17:00 CET (UTC+01:00)	N'Daw (yellow card) 58'; Métanire (yellow card) 81'; Maïga (yellow card) 89'	Report	Mandanne 26'; Pied 39'; Yatabaré (yellow card) 74'	Stadium: Stade Saint-Symphorien; Attendance: 20,252; Referee: Benoît Millot

22 February 2015 26	Reims	0–0	Metz	Reims
17:00 CET (UTC+01:00)	Conte (yellow card) 49'	Report	Philipps (yellow card) 53'; Palomino (yellow card) 61'	Stadium: Stade Auguste Delaune; Attendance: 12,575; Referee: Wilfried Bien

28 February 2015 27	Metz	1–2	Evian	Metz
20:00 CET (UTC+01:00)	Philipps (yellow card) 22'; Palomino (yellow card) 30'; Rivierez (yellow card) 38'; Sarr 45'	Report	Carrasso 29' (o.g.); Duhamel (yellow card) 45+2'; Sunu 73'	Stadium: Stade Saint-Symphorien; Attendance: 16,286; Referee: Philippe Kalt

7 March 2015 28	Rennes	1–0	Metz	Rennes
20:00 CET (UTC+01:00)	Ntep 19', (yellow card) 81'	Report	Palomino (yellow card) 90+2'	Stadium: Stade de la Route de Lorient; Attendance: 17,174; Referee: Antony Gautier

14 March 2015 29	Metz	2–3	Saint-Étienne	Metz
17:00 CET (UTC+01:00)	Métanire (yellow card) 52'; Lejeune 56'; Ngbakoto 90+1'; Marchal (yellow card) 90+2'	Report	Gradel 38'; Erdinç 42'; Mollo 80'	Stadium: Stade Municipal Saint-Symphorien; Attendance: 16,721; Referee: Nicolas Rainville

21 March 2015 30	Caen	0–0	Metz	Caen
20:00 CET (UTC+01:00)		Report		Stadium: Stade Michel d'Ornano; Attendance: 15,810; Referee: Alexandre Castro

4 April 2015 31	Metz	3–2	Toulouse	Metz
20:00 CEST (UTC+02:00)	Sarr (yellow card) 2'; Maïga 25', 42', 54'; José Luis Palomino (yellow card) 90+2'	Summary	Pešić (yellow card) 6'; Tisserand (yellow card) 10' (yellow-red card) 60'; Ben Yedder 22'; Regattin (yellow card) 71'; Bodiger (yellow card) 80'; Doumbia 90'	Stadium: Stade Municipal Saint-Symphorien; Attendance: 20,072; Referee: Bartolomeu Varela

18 April 2015 33	Metz	3–1	Lens	Metz
20:00 CEST (UTC+02:00)	Malouda 13'; Bussmann (yellow card) 25'; Sarr 57' (pen.); Maïga 79'	Report	Gbamin (yellow card) 44'; Cyprien (yellow card) 77'; Madiani 89'	Stadium: Stade Saint-Symphorien; Attendance: 16,875; Referee: Frank Schneider

25 April 2015 34	Bordeaux	1–1	Metz	Bordeaux
20:00 CEST (UTC+02:00)	Khazri (yellow card) 70', (goal) 83'	Report	Sassi 24', (yellow card) 34'; Lejeune (yellow card) 28'; Malouda (yellow card) 81'	Stadium: Stade Chaban-Delmas; Attendance: 22,708; Referee: Sebastien Desiage

28 April 2015 32	Paris Saint-Germain	3–1	Metz	Paris
21:00 CEST (UTC+02:00)	Verratti 25', (yellow card) 65'; Cavani 42'; Van der Wiel 77'	Report	Sassi (yellow card) 40'; Maïga 53'	Stadium: Parc des Princes; Attendance: 45,001; Referee: Mikael Lesage

1 May 2015 35	Metz	0–2	Marseille	Metz
20:30 CEST (UTC+02:00)	Malouda (yellow card) 40'	Report	Gignac 38', 62', (yellow card) 56'; Lemina (yellow card) 52'; Ayew (yellow card) 57'	Stadium: Stade Saint-Symphorien; Attendance: 23,190; Referee: Benoît Millot

9 May 2015 36	Metz	0–4	Lorient	Metz
20:00 CEST (UTC+02:00)	Maïga (yellow card) 60'; Ngbakoto (yellow card) 90+3'	Report	Mostefa 12'; Philippoteaux 34'; Koné 55'; Ayew 84'; Lecomte (yellow card) 90+3'	Stadium: Stade Saint-Symphorien; Attendance: 16,986; Referee: Wilfried Bien

16 May 2015 37	Monaco	2–0	Metz	Monaco
21:00 CEST (UTC+02:00)	Silva 45'; Germain 88'	Report	N'Daw (yellow card) 32'; Lejeune (yellow card) 52'; Ikaunieks (yellow card) 60'	Stadium: Stade Louis II; Attendance: 8,627; Referee: Amaury Delerue

23 May 2015 38	Metz	1–4	Lille	Metz
21:00 CEST (UTC+02:00)	Palomino 83'	Report	Balmont 40'; Gueye 41'; Roux 44', 69' (pen.)	Stadium: Stade Saint-Symphorien; Attendance: 15,939; Referee: Bartolomeu Varela

=== Coupe de France ===
4 January 2015 Round of 64	SAS Épinal	1–2	Metz	Valenciennes
13:45 CET (UTC+01:00)	Touati 11'; Colin (yellow card) 63'; Gazagnes (yellow card) 72'	Report 1, 2	Milán 15'; N'Daw 53'	Stadium: Stade du Hainaut; Attendance: 3,512; Referee: Frank Schneider

20 January 2015 Round of 32	US Avranches	0–3 (a.e.t.)	Metz	Avranches
18:30 CET (UTC+01:00)	Derrien (red card) 113'	Report 1, 2	Falcón (yellow card) 15'; Malouda (yellow card) 34'; N'Daw 94'; Sarr 96'; Cabon 115' (o.g.)	Stadium: Stade René Fenouillère; Attendance: 5,000; Referee: Antony Gautier

12 February 2015 Round of 16	Metz	0–0 (a.e.t.) (3–4 p)	Stade Brest	Metz
19:45 CET (UTC+01:00)	Sassi (yellow card) 36'; Krivets (yellow card) 88'; Sido (yellow card) 119'	Report 1, 2	Moimbé (yellow card) 18'; Tritz (yellow card) 40'	Stadium: Stade Saint-Symphorien; Attendance: 6,078; Referee: Amaury Delerue
	Penalties
	Falcón (penalty scored); Kashi (penalty scored); Lejeune (penalty scored); Marchal (penalty missed); Choplin (penalty missed)		(penalty scored) Pelé; (penalty scored) Courtet; (penalty scored) Ramaré; (penalty scored) Khaled; (penalty missed) Moimbé

=== Coupe de la Ligue ===
29 October 2014 Round of 32	Nice	3–3 (a.e.t.) (2–3 p)	Metz	Nice
18:30 CEST (UTC+02:00)	Maupay 20'; Palun (yellow card) 32'; Bosetti 37'; Cvitanich 88' (pen.)	Report	Palomino 5'; Ngbakoto 13'; Vion 17'; Kashi (yellow card) 42'; Marchal (yellow card) 45+1'; Doukouré (yellow card) 82'; Rocchi (yellow card) 113'	Stadium: Allianz Riviera; Attendance: 9,560; Referee: Ruddy Buquet
	Penalties
	Bodmer (penalty missed); Cvitanich (penalty missed); Pléa (penalty scored); Eysseric (penalty scored); Bosetti (penalty missed)		(penalty missed) Malouda; (penalty scored) Doukouré; (penalty scored) Marchal; (penalty scored) Palomino

16 December 2014 Round of 16	Nantes	4–2 (a.e.t.)	Metz	Nantes
21:00 CET (UTC+01:00)	Vizcarrondo 71'; Gakpé 83' (pen.); Riou (yellow card) 84'; Audel 92'; Deaux (yellow card) 94'; Gomis (yellow card) 101'; Bangoura 118'	Report	Falcón 60'; Doukouré 62'; Sarr (yellow card) 69'; Bussmann (red card) 82'; Vion (yellow card) 84'; Choplin (yellow card) 101'	Stadium: Stade de la Beaujoire; Attendance: 12,601; Referee: Amaury Delerue
