= 2016–17 FC Metz season =

Metz
2016–17 season
- Chairman: Bernard Serin
- Manager: Philippe Hinschberger
- Stadium: Stade Saint-Symphorien
- Ligue 1: 14th
- Coupe de France: Round of 64
- Coupe de la Ligue: Quarter-finals
- Top goalscorer: League: Cheick Diabaté (8); All: Cheick Diabaté (8)
- Highest home attendance: 21,009 vs Marseille (4 February 2017)
- Lowest home attendance: 5,876 vs Toulouse (14 December 2016)
- Average home league attendance: 16,714
Home colours	Away colours	Third colours

The 2016–17 FC Metz season was the 83rd professional season of the club since its creation in 1932.

== Current squad ==
Note: Flags indicate national team as defined under FIFA eligibility rules; some limited exceptions apply. Players may hold more than one non-FIFA nationality.

No.	Pos.	Nation	Player
1	GK	FRA	Thomas Didillon
3	DF	FRA	Jonathan Rivierez
4	DF	SRB	Milan Biševac
5	DF	ARG	Guido Milán
6	DF	FRA	Simon Falette
7	FW	FRA	Gauthier Hein
8	MF	FRA	Yann Jouffre
9	FW	TUR	Mevlüt Erdinç (on loan from Hannover 96)
10	MF	CIV	Cheick Doukouré
11	FW	FRA	Opa Nguette
12	DF	FRA	Matthieu Udol
13	DF	FRA	Franck Signorino
14	MF	CMR	Georges Mandjeck
16	GK	JPN	Eiji Kawashima

No.	Pos.	Nation	Player
17	FW	SEN	Habib Diallo
18	FW	FRA	Thibaut Vion
19	MF	FRA	Florent Mollet
20	MF	FRA	Alexis Larriere
21	DF	SRB	Vahid Selimovic
22	MF	FRA	Kévin Lejeune
23	DF	LUX	Chris Philipps
24	MF	FRA	Renaud Cohade
25	DF	ESP	Iván Balliu
26	MF	SEN	Ismaïla Sarr
27	MF	LAT	Jānis Ikaunieks
29	FW	LUX	Vincent Thill
30	GK	FRA	David Oberhauser
32	DF	CMR	Benoît Assou-Ekotto

=== Transfers ===
In:

No.	Pos.	Nation	Player
6	DF	FRA	Simon Falette (from (France) Brest)
8	MF	FRA	Yann Jouffre (from (France) Lorient)
9	FW	TUR	Mevlüt Erdinç (on loan from (Germany) Hannover 96, previously on loan at (France) Guingamp)
11	FW	FRA	Opa Nguette (from (France) Valenciennes)
13	DF	FRA	Franck Signorino (from (France) Stade Reims)
16	GK	JPN	Eiji Kawashima (from (Scotland) Dundee United)
19	MF	FRA	Florent Mollet (from (France) Créteil)
32	DF	CMR	Benoît Assou-Ekotto (from (France) Saint-Étienne)

Out:

No.	Pos.	Nation	Player
11	MF	FRA	Samy Kehli (to (Belgium) Roeselare)
15	DF	FRA	Romain Métanire (to (Belgium) Kortrijk)
23	MF	FRA	Yeni Ngbakoto (to (England) QPR)
27	DF	ARG	José Luis Palomino (to (Bulgaria) Ludogorets Razgrad)

== Statistics ==
=== Top scorers ===
Rank	Nation	Number	Name	Ligue 1	Coupe de France	Coupe de la Ligue	Goals scored
1	(Turkey)	9	Mevlüt Erdinç	5	0	0	5
2	(France)	8	Yann Jouffre	1	0	0	1
2	(Argentina)	5	Guido Milán	1	0	0	1
2	(France)	6	Simon Falette	1	0	0	1
TOTAL				8	0	0	8

== Competitions ==
=== Ligue 1 ===
==== League table ====
Pos	Team	Pld	W	D	L	GF	GA	GD	Pts
12	Angers	38	13	7	18	40	49	−9	46
13	Toulouse	38	10	14	14	37	41	−4	44
14	Metz	38	11	10	17	39	72	−33	43
15	Montpellier	38	10	9	19	48	66	−18	39
16	Dijon	38	8	13	17	46	58	−12	37

Source: Ligue 1, Soccerway
Rules for classification: 1) Points; 2) Goal difference; 3) Goals scored; 4) Head-to-head goal difference; 5) Fairplay ranking.

==== Results summary ====
Overall								Home						Away					
Pld	W	D	L	GF	GA	GD	Pts	W	D	L	GF	GA	GD	W	D	L	GF	GA	GD
38	11	10	17	39	72	−33	43	7	7	5	27	34	−7	4	3	12	12	38	−26

Last updated: 20 May 2017.
Source: Competitive matches

==== Results by round ====
Round	1	2	3	4	5	6	7	8	9	10	11	12	13	14	15	16	17	18	19	20	21	22	23	24	25	26	27	28	29	30	31	32	33	34	35	36	37	38
Ground	H	A	H	A	A	H	A	H	A	H	A	H	A	H	A	H	A	A	H	A	H	A	H	H	A	H	A	H	A	H	H	A	H	A	H	A	H	A
Result	W	L	W	W	D	L	W	L	L	L	L	D	W	D	L	L	L	L	D	D	W	L	W	W	L	D	L	D	D	W	L	L	D	L	W	W	D	L
Position	4	15	7	3	4	9	6	8	11	12	13	14	12	11	12	13	15	18	18	19	16	18	16	11	13	14	15	15	16	13	14	15	15	15	15	13	14	14

A = Away; H = Home; W = Win; D = Draw; L = Loss

==== Matches ====
13 August 2016 1	Metz	3–2	Lille	Metz
20:00 CEST (UTC+2)	Erdinç 56', 76' (pen.); Jouffre 88' (pen.)		Rony Lopes 35', 70'	Stadium: Stade Saint-Symphorien; Attendance: 17,174; Referee: Mikaël Lesage

21 August 2016 2	Paris Saint-Germain	3–0	Metz	Paris
20:45 CEST (UTC+2)	Lucas Moura 52'; Kurzawa 67'; Verratti 90+4'			Stadium: Parc des Princes; Attendance: 46,011; Referee: François Letexier

27 August 2016 3	Metz	2–0	Angers	Metz
20:00 CEST (UTC+2)	Falette 42'; Milán 89'	Report		Stadium: Stade Saint-Symphorien; Attendance: 14,805; Referee: Karim Abed

11 September 2016 4	Nantes	0–3	Metz	Nantes
15:00 CEST (UTC+2)		Report	Erdinç 18', 45+3', 78' (pen.)	Stadium: Stade de la Beaujoire; Attendance: 19,438; Referee: Jérôme Miguelgorry

17 September 2016 5	Dijon	0–0	Metz	Dijon
20:00 CEST (UTC+2)		Report		Stadium: Stade Gaston Gérard; Attendance: 8,336; Referee: Bartolomeu Varela

21 September 2016 6	Metz	0–3	Bordeaux	Metz
19:00 CEST (UTC+2)		Report	Malcom 36'; Laborde 71'; Kiese Thelin 76' (pen.)	Stadium: Stade Saint-Symphorien; Attendance: 15,711; Referee: Mikaël Lesage

24 September 2016 7	Montpellier	0–1	Metz	Montpellier
20:00 CEST (UTC+2)		Report	Erdinç 45+2' (pen.)	Stadium: Stade de la Mosson; Referee: Tony Chapron

1 October 2016 8	Metz	0–7	Monaco	Metz
20:00 CEST (UTC+2)		Report	Lemar 8'; Germain 23'; Silva 40'; Fabinho 68' (pen.); Carrillo 72', 83'; Boschilia 89'	Stadium: Stade Saint-Symphorien; Attendance: 19,163; Referee: Ruddy Buquet

16 October 2016 9	Marseille	1–0	Metz	Marseille
20:45 CEST (UTC+2)	Gomis 13'	Report		Stadium: Stade Vélodrome; Attendance: 25,588; Referee: Jérôme Miguelgorry

23 October 2016 10	Metz	2–4	Nice	Metz
20:45 CEST (UTC+2)	Mandjeck 25'; Diallo 69'	Report	Pléa 12', 36' (pen.), 84'; Cyprien 90+1'	Stadium: Stade Saint-Symphorien; Attendance: 17,993; Referee: François Letexier

30 October 2016 11	Rennes	1–0	Metz	Rennes
17:00 CET (UTC+1)	Saïd 56'	Report		Stadium: Roazhon Park; Attendance: 20,874; Referee: Saïd Ennjimi

5 November 2016 12	Metz	0–0	Saint-Étienne	Metz
17:00 CET (UTC+1)			Tannane (yellow card) 35' (yellow card) 36' (red card)	Stadium: Stade Saint-Symphorien; Attendance: 16,204; Referee: Bartolomeu Varela

19 November 2016 13	Toulouse	1–2	Metz	Toulouse
20:00 CET (UTC+1)	Édouard 90+5'		Jouffre 35' (pen.); Mandjeck 48'	Stadium: Stadium Municipal; Attendance: 17,746; Referee: Sébastien Desiage

26 November 2016 14	Metz	3–3	Lorient	Metz
20:00 CET (UTC+1)	Falette 11'; Vion 75', 78'		Waris 16'; Moukandjo 54', 61' (pen.)	Stadium: Stade Saint-Symphorien; Attendance: 12,657; Referee: Mikael Lesage

30 November 2016 15	Nancy	4–0	Metz	Tomblaine
19:00 CET (UTC+1)	Pedretti 38'; Cuffaut 78'; Dia 80'; Aït Bennasser 90+3'		Assou-Ekotto (yellow card) 19' (yellow card) 83' (red card)	Stadium: Stade Marcel Picot; Attendance: 19,085; Referee: Jérôme Miguelgorry

3 December 2016 16	Metz	Abandoned	Lyon	Metz
20:00 CET (UTC+1)		Match suspended		Stadium: Stade Saint-Symphorien; Referee: Lionel Jaffredo

10 December 2016 17	Bastia	2–0	Metz	Furiani
20:00 CET (UTC+1)	Danic 23'; Saint-Maximin 75'			Stadium: Stade Armand Cesari; Attendance: 9,882; Referee: Olivier Thual

18 December 2016 18	Caen	3–0	Metz	Caen
14:30 CET (UTC+1)	Karamoh 20'; Santini 61'; Sané 90+3'		Biševac (red card) 57'	Stadium: Stade Michel d'Ornano; Attendance: 16,849; Referee: François Letexier

21 December 2016 19	Metz	2–2	Guingamp	Metz
20:50 CET (UTC+1)	Nguette 12'; Cohade (yellow card) 45'; Vion (yellow card) 83'; Hein 90+2'	Summary	Briand 49' 74'; Salibur (yellow card) 66'	Stadium: Stade Saint-Symphorien; Attendance: 14,091; Referee: Sebastien Desiage

15 January 2017 20	Nice	0–0	Metz	Nice
15:00 CET (UTC+1)	Sarr (yellow card) 39'; Koziello (yellow card) 75'	Summary	Diagne (yellow card) 73'	Stadium: Allianz Riviera; Attendance: 21,502; Referee: Bartolomeu Varela

21 January 2017 21	Metz	2–0	Montpellier	Metz
20:00 CET (UTC+1)	Diabaté 14', 19'	Report		Stadium: Stade Saint-Symphorien; Attendance: 11,553; Referee: Hakim Ben El Hadj

28 January 2017 22	Angers	2–1	Metz	Angers
20:00 CET (UTC+1)	Tait 25'; Pépé 35'	Report	Traoré 33' (o.g.)	Stadium: Stade Jean-Bouin; Attendance: 10,540; Referee: Karim Abed

4 February 2017 23	Metz	1–0	Marseille	Metz
20:45 CET (UTC+1)	Jouffre 83'	Report		Stadium: Stade Saint-Symphorien; Attendance: 21,009; Referee: Mikael Lesage

8 February 2017 24	Metz	2–1	Dijon	Metz
19:00 CET (UTC+1)	Sarr 46'; Diabaté 66' (pen.)	Report	Varrault 78'	Stadium: Stade Saint-Symphorien; Attendance: 11,971; Referee: Sébastien Desiage

11 February 2017 25	Monaco	5–0	Metz	Monaco
20:00 CET (UTC+1)	Mbappé 7', 20', 49'; Falcao 10', 55'	Report		Stadium: Stade Louis II; Attendance: 6,069; Referee: Olivier Thual

18 February 2017 26	Metz	1–1	Nantes	Metz
20:00 CET (UTC+1)	Diabaté 90+1' (pen.)	Report	Rongier 68'	Stadium: Stade Saint-Symphorien; Attendance: 13,022; Referee: Bartolomeu Varela

25 February 2017 27	Lyon	5–0	Metz	Décines-Charpieu
17:00 CET (UTC+1)	Depay 43', 53'; Balliu 74' (o.g.); Lacazette 78'; Valbuena 90+2'	Report		Stadium: Parc Olympique Lyonnais; Attendance: 32,488; Referee: François Letexier

4 March 2017 28	Metz	1–1	Rennes	Metz
19:00 CET (UTC+1)	Diabaté (yellow card) 18', (goal) 45+1'; Falette (yellow card) 62'; Balliu (yellow card) 76'	Report	Gnagnon (yellow card) 11'; Gourcuff (yellow card) 34'; Sio (yellow card) 56'; Saïd 90'	Stadium: Stade Saint-Symphorien; Attendance: 16,151; Referee: Benoît Millot

12 March 2017 29	Saint-Étienne	2–2	Metz	Saint-Étienne
15:00 CET (UTC+1)	Berić 53'; Perrin 90+5'	Report	Sarr 1'; Falette 67'; Doukouré (yellow card) 69'	Stadium: Stade Geoffroy-Guichard; Attendance: 24,184; Referee: Jérôme Miguelgorry

17 March 2017 30	Metz	1–0	Bastia	Metz
19:00 CET (UTC+1)	Cioni 46' (o.g.); Balliu (yellow card) 50'; Nguette (yellow card) 69'	Report	Cioni (yellow card) 38'; Ngando (yellow card) 78'	Stadium: Stade Saint-Symphorien; Attendance: 17,006; Referee: Johan Hamel

5 April 2017 16 replay	Metz	0–3	Lyon	Metz
19:00 CEST (UTC+2)	Mollet (yellow card) 4'; Philipps (yellow card) 36'; Mandjeck (yellow card) 76'	Report	Diakhaby (yellow card) 56'; Lacazette 59'; Ferri 87'; Tolisso 90+1'	Stadium: Stade Saint-Symphorien; Attendance: 0 Referee: Ruddy Buquet

8 April 2017 31	Bordeaux	3–0	Metz	Bordeaux
20:00 CEST (UTC+2)	Sankharé (yellow card) 7'; Toulalan (yellow card) 11'; Malcom 14'; Vada 50' (pen.), 52'	Report	Cohade (yellow card) 31'; Mollet (yellow card) 90'; Assou-Ekotto (red card) 90+3'	Stadium: Matmut Atlantique; Attendance: 19,835; Referee: Sébastien Desiage

15 April 2017 32	Metz	2–2	Caen	Metz
20:00 CEST (UTC+2)	Sarr 65'; Diabaté 83'; Biševac (yellow card) 90+4'	Summary	Adéoti (yellow card) 56'; Santini 74'; Rodelin 88'	Stadium: Stade Saint-Symphorien; Attendance: 16,038; Referee: Bartolomeu Varela

18 April 2017 33	Metz	2–3	Paris Saint-Germain	Metz
18:30 CEST (UTC+2)	Diagne (yellow card) 42'; Jouffre 78'; Diabaté 88'	Report	Cavani 33'; Matuidi 36', 90+3'; Kimpembe (yellow card) 90+1'	Stadium: Stade Saint-Symphorien; Attendance: 20,693; Referee: Johan Hamel

22 April 2017 34	Lorient	5–1	Metz	Lorient
20:00 CEST (UTC+2)	Ciani 13', (yellow card) 31'; Waris 49'; Cabot 60', 66'; Moukandjo 78'	Summary	Diabaté 32' (pen.); Cohade (yellow card) 77'	Stadium: Stade du Moustoir - Yves Allainmat; Attendance: 14,114; Referee: Antony Gautier

29 April 2017 35	Metz	2–1	Nancy	Metz
20:00 CEST (UTC+2)	Sarr 28'; Nguette 53'; Falette (yellow card) 55'; Doukouré (yellow card) 70'	Report	Diarra (yellow card) 25'; Maouassa 41'; Badila (yellow card) 45+2'; Cétout (yellow card) 64'	Stadium: Stade Saint-Symphorien; Attendance: 20,009; Referee: François Letexier

6 May 2017 36	Lille	0–2	Metz	Villeneuve d'Ascq
20:00 CEST (UTC+2)	Corchia (yellow card) 53'	Report	Mandjeck 37'; Cohade 56'	Stadium: Stade Pierre-Mauroy; Attendance: 28,331; Referee: Olivier Thual

14 May 2017 37	Metz	1–1	Toulouse	Metz
21:00 CEST (UTC+2)	Sarr 66'	Report	Braithwaite 9'	Stadium: Stade Saint-Symphorien; Attendance: 16,282; Referee: Stéphane Lannoy

20 May 2017 38	Guingamp	1–0	Metz	Guingamp
21:00 CEST (UTC+2)	Diallo 29'	Report	Philipps (yellow card); Falette (yellow card)	Stadium: Stade de Roudourou; Attendance: 16,200; Referee: Ruddy Buquet

=== Coupe de France ===
8 January 2017 Round of 64	Lens	2–0	Metz	Lens
14:15 CET (UTC+1)	Bourigeaud 63'; Koukou (red card) 83'; López 90'			Stadium: Stade Bollaert-Delelis; Attendance: 15,964; Referee: Sylvain Palhies

=== Coupe de la Ligue ===
26 October 2016 Round of 32	Paris FC	1–1 (6–7 p)	Metz	Paris
21:05 CEST (UTC+2)	Missi Mezu 27'		Nguette 65'	Stadium: Stade Charléty; Attendance: 3,321; Referee: Karim Abed
	Penalties
	Ech-Chergui (penalty scored); Marie (penalty missed); Gbessi (penalty scored); Pierazzi (penalty scored); Bakayoko (penalty scored); Bong (penalty scored); Missi Mezu (penalty scored); Nanizayamo (penalty missed)		(penalty scored) Cohade; (penalty scored) Milán; (penalty scored) Falette; (penalty scored) Nguette; (penalty missed) Erdinç; (penalty scored) Diallo; (penalty scored) Doukouré; (penalty scored) Balliu

14 December 2016 Round of 16	Metz	1–1 (11–10 p)	Toulouse	Metz
21:05 CET (UTC+1)	Mollet 11'	Report	Braithwaite 28' (pen.)	Stadium: Stade Saint-Symphorien; Attendance: 5,876; Referee: Benoît Millot
	Penalties
	Milán (penalty scored); Phillips (penalty scored); Falette (penalty scored); Balliu (penalty scored); Cohade (penalty scored); Nguette (penalty scored); Mandjeck (penalty scored); Diallo (penalty scored); Signorino (penalty scored); Sarr (penalty scored); Oberhauser (penalty scored)		(penalty scored) Toivonen; (penalty scored) Sirieix; (penalty scored) Sylla; (penalty scored) Bodiger; (penalty scored) Braithwaite; (penalty scored) Somalia; (penalty scored) Jullien; (penalty scored) Michelin; (penalty scored) Yago; (penalty scored) Ninkov; (penalty missed) Goicoechea

11 January 2017 Quarter-finals	Paris Saint-Germain	2–0	Metz	Paris
21:05 CET (UTC+1)	Thiago Silva 27', 72'	Report		Stadium: Parc des Princes; Attendance: 43,857; Referee: Amaury Delerue
