= Cheick Doukouré =

Ivorian footballer (born 1992)

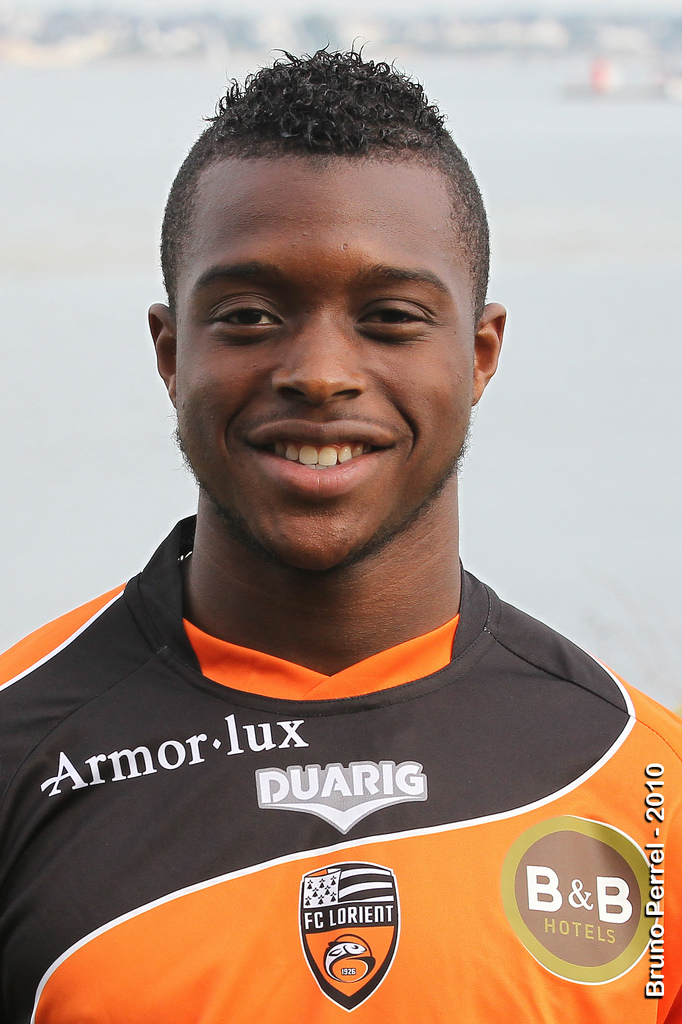
- Doukouré with Lorient

Personal information
- Full name: Cheick Yves Doukouré
- Birth name: Cheick Kader Doukouré
- Date of birth: 11 September 1992 (age 34)
- Place of birth: Cocody, Ivory Coast
- Height: 1.80 m (5 ft 11 in)
- Position: Central midfielder

Team information
- Current team: Prishtina e Re
- Number: 13

Youth career
- 1999–2007: Aubervilliers
- 2007–2010: Lorient

Senior career*
Years	Team	Apps	(Gls)
2010–2014	Lorient II	42	(1)
2010–2014	Lorient	23	(1)
2012–2013	→ Épinal (loan)	23	(1)
2014–2015	Metz II	5	(0)
2014–2017	Metz	58	(1)
2017–2021	Levante	35	(1)
2019–2020	→ Huesca (loan)	4	(0)
2021–2022	Leganés	14	(0)
2022–2024	Aris	35	(1)
2024–2025	Iraklis	14	(0)
2025–	Prishtina e Re	22	(1)

International career^{‡}
2009	France U18	2	(0)
2011	France U19	4	(0)
2015–2018	Ivory Coast	20	(1)
- * Club domestic league appearances and goals as of 22 June 2026 ‡ National team caps and goals as of 12 October 2018

Cheick Yves Doukouré (born 11 September 1992) is an Ivorian professional footballer who plays as a central midfielder for Kosovan club Prishtina e Re.

== Early life ==
Born in Cocody, Ivory Coast, Doukouré moved to France at early age. He acquired French nationality on 13 September 2004, through the collective effect of his mother's naturalization, and legally changed his first name from Cheick Kader to Cheick Yves.

== Club career ==
=== Lorient ===
Doukouré joined FC Lorient's youth setup in 2007, from FCM Aubervilliers. After featuring regularly for the reserves, he made his first team – and Ligue 1 – debut on 7 August 2010, coming on as a second-half substitute for Yann Jouffre in a 2–2 away draw against AJ Auxerre.

After being rarely used, Doukouré was loaned to Championnat National side SAS Épinal for one year on 27 July 2012. Upon returning, he started to feature more regularly, and scored his first goal for the club on 10 May 2014 in a 1–0 away success over Lyon.

=== Metz ===
On 20 June 2014, Doukouré joined fellow first division side FC Metz on a free transfer. He made his debut for the club on 9 August, replacing Fadil Sido in a 0–0 draw at Lille OSC.

Doukouré appeared in 20 matches during the 2014–15 season, as his side suffered relegation. The following campaign, he appeared rarely as his side returned to the main category; in 2017, he also wore the captain armband in some matches.

=== Levante ===
On 4 August 2017, Doukouré signed a four-year deal with La Liga side Levante UD. The transfer fee paid to Metz was reported as €1.5 million. He made his debut in the category on 21 August, coming on as a substitute for Enis Bardhi in a 1–0 home win against Villarreal CF.

On 2 September 2019, Doukouré was loaned to Segunda División side SD Huesca for the season.

=== Leganés ===
On 23 July 2021, Doukouré signed a one-year deal with CD Leganés in the second division. The following 29 January, he left the club.

=== Aris Thessaloniki ===
On 29 January 2022, Aris Thessaloniki officially announced the signing of Cheick Doukouré on an 2 1/2-year contract.

== International career ==
After representing France at the under-18 and under-19 levels, Doukouré subsequently switched allegiance back to his home country Ivory Coast. On 11 January 2015, he made his full international debut for the latter, starting in a 1–0 friendly win against Nigeria.

== Career statistics ==
=== Club ===
As of match played 18 June 2025

Appearances and goals by club, season and competition
Club	Season	League			National cup		League cup		Continental		Other		Total	
Club	Season	Division	Apps	Goals	Apps	Goals	Apps	Goals	Apps	Goals	Apps	Goals	Apps	Goals
Lorient	2010–11	Ligue 1	4	0	0	0	0	0	—		—		4	0
Lorient	2011–12	Ligue 1	0	0	0	0	0	0	—		—		0	0
Lorient	2013–14	Ligue 1	19	1	1	0	—		—		—		20	1
Lorient	Total		23	1	1	0	0	0	—		—		24	1
Épinal (loan)	2012–13	Championnat National	23	1	3	0	—		—		—		26	1
Metz	2014–15	Ligue 1	20	0	0	0	2	1	—		—		22	1
Metz	2015–16	Ligue 2	9	1	0	0	2	0	—		—		11	1
Metz	2016–17	Ligue 1	29	0	0	0	1	0	—		—		30	0
Metz	Total		58	1	0	0	5	1	—		—		63	2
Levante	2017–18	La Liga	19	1	2	1	—		—		—		21	2
Levante	2018–19	La Liga	9	0	3	0	—		—		—		12	0
Levante	2020–21	La Liga	7	0	0	0	—		—		—		7	0
Levante	Total		35	1	5	1	—		—		—		40	2
Huesca (loan)	2019–20	Segunda División	4	0	—		—		—		—		4	0
Leganés	2021–22	Segunda División	14	0	3	1	—		—		—		17	1
Aris	2021–22	Superleague Greece	10	1	—		—		—		—		10	1
Aris	2022–23	Superleague Greece	16	0	4	0	—		4	1	—		24	1
Aris	2023–24	Superleague Greece	10	0	5	0	—		—		—		15	0
Aris	Total		36	1	9	0	—		4	1	—		49	2
Iraklis	2024–25	Superleague Greece 2	14	0	1	0	—		—		—		15	0
Career total			203	5	22	2	5	1	4	1	0	0	234	9

=== International ===
Scores and results list Ivory Coast's goal tally first.

No.	Date	Venue	Opponent	Score	Result	Competition
1.	12 October 2018	Stade Bouaké, Bouaké, Ivory Coast	Central African Republic	3–0	4–0	2019 Africa Cup of Nations qualification

== Honours ==
Ivory Coast

- Africa Cup of Nations: 2015
