= Carrasso =

Carrasso is a surname. Notable people with the surname include:

- Cédric Carrasso (born 1981), French footballer
- Johann Carrasso (born 1988), French footballer, brother of Cédric
