= Bouna Sarr =

Senegalese footballer (born 1992)

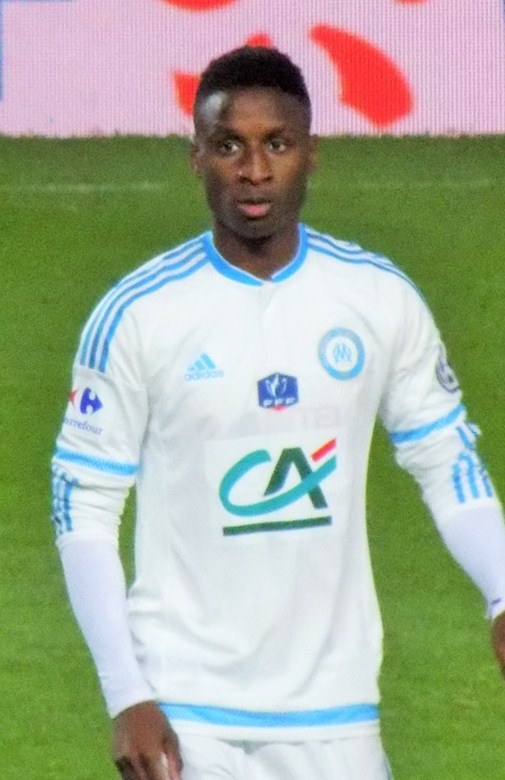
- Sarr playing for Marseille in 2016

Personal information
- Full name: Bouna Junior Sarr
- Date of birth: 31 January 1992 (age 34)
- Place of birth: Lyon, France
- Height: 1.77 m (5 ft 10 in)
- Positions: Right back; winger

Team information
- Current team: Metz
- Number: 70

Youth career
- 1998–2005: FC Gerland
- 2005–2009: Lyon
- 2009–2011: Metz

Senior career*
Years	Team	Apps	(Gls)
2010–2014	Metz II	27	(8)
2011–2015	Metz	96	(7)
2015–2020	Marseille	138	(4)
2020–2024	Bayern Munich	16	(0)
2026–	Metz	12	(0)

International career
2021–2022	Senegal	13	(0)
Medal record
Men's football
Representing Senegal
Africa Cup of Nations
Winner	2021 Cameroon
- * Club domestic league appearances and goals as of 20 May 2026 (UTC)

Bouna Junior Sarr (born 31 January 1992) is a professional footballer who plays as a right-back or winger for Ligue 2 club Metz. Born in France, he played for the Senegal national team.

== Club career ==
=== Metz ===
Sarr played his first senior match for Metz against Tours on 29 July 2011. He later became an integral part of their promotion from the Championnat National to Ligue 1.

=== Marseille ===
Sarr signed for Marseille on 7 July 2015. On 12 April 2018, he scored his first goal in European competitions in a 5–2 win over RB Leipzig in the Europa League quarter-final second leg. On 3 May, he played in the Europa League semi-finals away to Red Bull Salzburg as Marseille played out a 1–2 away loss but a 3–2 aggregate win to secure a place in the 2018 UEFA Europa League Final, which was played at the Parc Olympique Lyonnais in Décines-Charpieu, Lyon, France on 16 May 2018, against Atlético Madrid.

=== Bayern Munich ===
On 5 October 2020, Sarr signed for Bundesliga club Bayern Munich on a four-year deal. Sarr made his debut for Bayern in the first round of the DFB-Pokal on 15 October and provided two assists to fellow new signing Eric Maxim Choupo-Moting as the club defeated fifth division side 1. FC Düren by a score of 3–0. On 25 August 2021, he scored his first goal for the club in the same competition, in the first round of the following season, in a 12–0 hammering of fifth division club Bremer SV.

On 6 May 2023, he featured in his only match of the 2022–23 season after 424 days of his last match, coming off the bench in the 88th minute, in a 2–1 away win over Werder Bremen. On 26 September, he played his first match of the following season, where he provided an assist in a 4–0 away win over Preußen Münster in the DFB-Pokal. On 11 November, he made his first start since April 2021, in a 4–2 victory over Heidenheim. Later that year, on 1 December, he had surgery on his torn ACL in his left knee, which would force him to be sidelined for several months.

After playing only 16 Bundesliga matches in four seasons, on 12 May 2024, Bayern Munich announced that Sarr would leave the club at the end of the season when his contract expired.

=== Return to Metz ===
After not playing professionally for a season and a half, on 2 February 2026 Sarr returned to Metz.

== International career ==
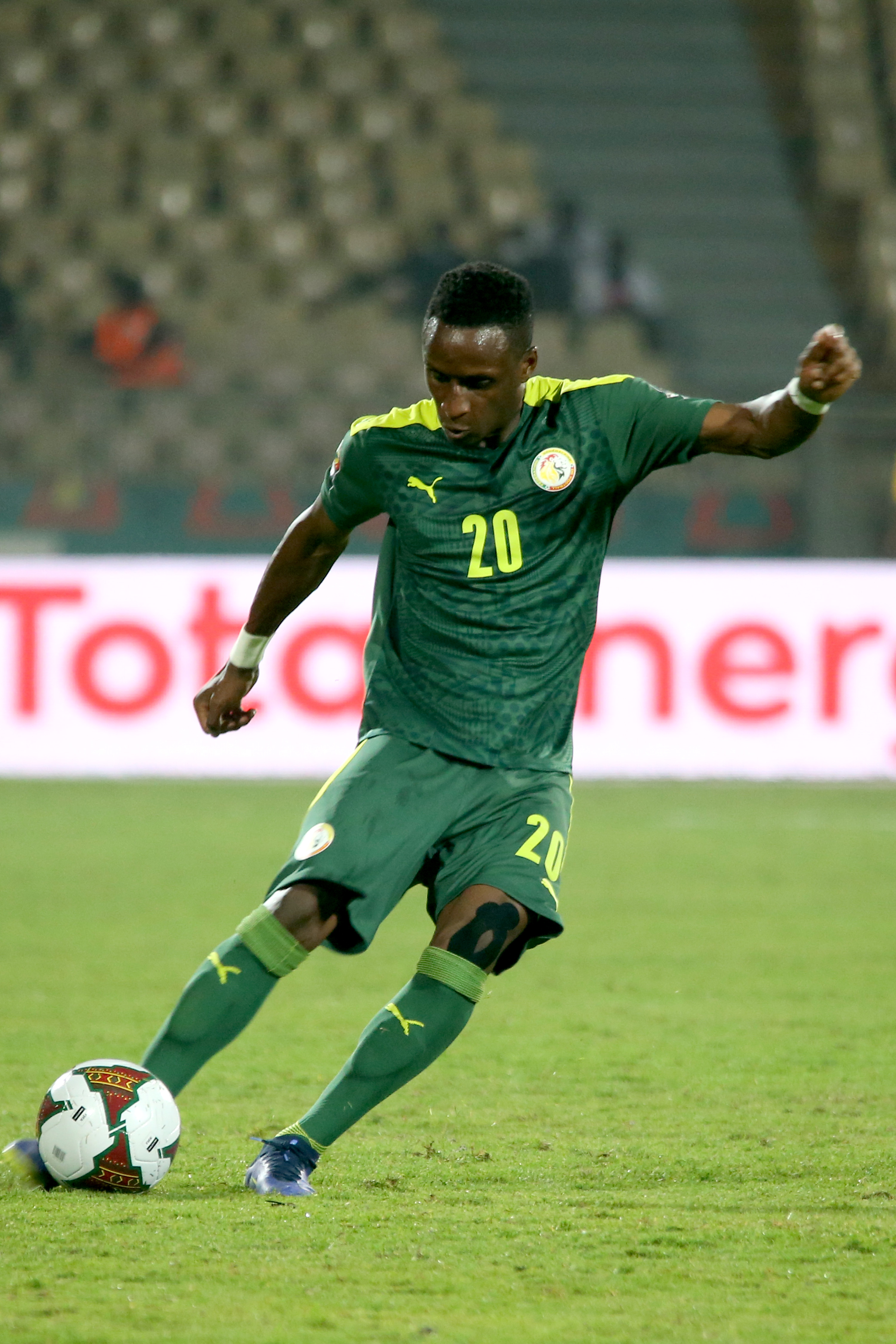
Sarr with Senegal in 2022

Sarr was born in France to a Senegalese father and a Guinean mother. He was called up by the Guinea national team in December 2014, but he did not play for them. In late April 2018, he was approached by the Senegal national team and turned down the offer. However, Sarr decided to represent Senegal as he was called up in late September 2021 by Aliou Cissé for the upcoming 2022 FIFA World Cup qualifiers against Namibia, Togo and Congo. He debuted with Senegal in a 4–1 2022 FIFA World Cup qualification win over Namibia on 9 October 2021. Sarr was called up for the Senegal national team to compete in the 2021 Africa Cup of Nations, where he played every match, eventually winning in the final against Egypt.

He was appointed a Grand Officer of the National Order of the Lion by President of Senegal Macky Sall following the nation's victory at the 2021 Africa Cup of Nations. In September 2022, he had a knee surgery which forced him to miss the 2022 FIFA World Cup in Qatar.

== Career statistics ==
=== Club ===
As of match played 17 May 2026

Appearances and goals by club, season and competition
Club	Season	League			National Cup		Europe		Other		Total	
Club	Season	Division	Apps	Goals	Apps	Goals	Apps	Goals	Apps	Goals	Apps	Goals
Metz	2011–12	Ligue 2	9	1	1	0	—		0	0	10	1
Metz	2012–13	Championnat National	29	3	1	0	—		3	0	33	3
Metz	2013–14	Ligue 2	28	1	1	0	—		1	0	30	1
Metz	2014–15	Ligue 1	30	2	2	1	—		1	0	33	3
Metz	Total		96	7	5	1	0	0	5	0	106	8
Marseille	2015–16	Ligue 1	25	2	3	0	3 (Note: Appearances in UEFA Europa League)	0	2	1	33	3
Marseille	2016–17	Ligue 1	26	0	1	0	0	0	2	1	29	1
Marseille	2017–18	Ligue 1	29	0	3	0	15	1	1	0	48	1
Marseille	2018–19	Ligue 1	29	1	1	0	6	0	1	0	37	1
Marseille	2019–20	Ligue 1	27	1	4	1	0	0	1	0	32	2
Marseille	2020–21	Ligue 1	2	0	0	0	0	0	0	0	2	0
Marseille	Total		138	4	12	1	24	1	7	2	181	8
Bayern Munich	2020–21	Bundesliga	8	0	2	0	5 (Note: Appearances in UEFA Champions League)	0	0	0	15	0
Bayern Munich	2021–22	Bundesliga	5	0	1	1	5	0	1	0	12	1
Bayern Munich	2022–23	Bundesliga	1	0	0	0	0	0	0	0	1	0
Bayern Munich	2023–24	Bundesliga	2	0	2	0	1	0	0	0	5	0
Bayern Munich	Total		16	0	5	1	11	0	1	0	33	1
Metz	2025–26	Ligue 1	12	0	—		—		—		12	0
Career total			262	11	22	3	35	1	13	2	332	17

=== International ===
National team	Year	Apps	Goals
Senegal	2021	4	0
Senegal	2022	9	0
Total		13	0

== Honours ==
Marseille

- UEFA Europa League runner-up: 2017–18

Bayern Munich

- Bundesliga: 2020–21, 2021–22, 2022–23
- DFL-Supercup: 2021
- FIFA Club World Cup: 2020

Senegal

- Africa Cup of Nations: 2021

Individual

- Grand Officer of the National Order of the Lion: 2022
