= 2015–16 1. FSV Mainz 05 season =

1. FSV Mainz 05
2015–16 season
- Sport director: Christian Heidel
- President: Harald Strutz
- Manager: Martin Schmidt
- Stadium: Coface Arena, Mainz
- Bundesliga: 6th
- DFB-Pokal: Round 2
- Top goalscorer: Yunus Mallı (11)
- Highest home attendance: 34,000 (sold out: 4x)
- Lowest home attendance: 17,617 (vs. 1860 Munich)
- Average home league attendance: 30,881
- Biggest win: Mainz 3–0 Hannover
- Biggest defeat: Mainz 0–3 Bayern
| Home colours | Away colours | Third colours |
- All statistics correct as of 7 May 2016.

The 2015–16 1. FSV Mainz 05 season is the 111th season in the football club's history and 7th consecutive and 10th overall season in the top flight of German football, the Bundesliga, having been promoted from the 2. Bundesliga in 2009. In addition to the domestic league, Mainz will also participate in this season's edition of the domestic cup, the DFB-Pokal. This will be the 5th season for the club in the Coface Arena, located in Mainz, Germany. The stadium has a capacity of 34,034. The season covers a period from 1 July 2015 to 30 June 2016.

== Squad ==
Note: Flags indicate national team as defined under FIFA eligibility rules; some limited exceptions apply. Players may hold more than one non-FIFA nationality.

| No. | Pos. | Nation | Player |
|---|---|---|---|
| 1 | GK | GER | Loris Karius |
| 2 | DF | ITA | Giulio Donati |
| 3 | DF | NGR | Leon Balogun |
| 5 | DF | POR | Henrique Sereno |
| 6 | MF | GER | Danny Latza |
| 7 | DF | SWE | Pierre Bengtsson |
| 8 | MF | GER | Christoph Moritz |
| 9 | FW | JPN | Yoshinori Muto |
| 10 | MF | TUR | Yunus Mallı |
| 11 | FW | DEN | Emil Berggreen |
| 14 | MF | AUT | Julian Baumgartlinger (captain) |
| 15 | FW | COL | Jhon Córdoba (on loan from Granada) |
| 16 | DF | GER | Stefan Bell |
| 17 | MF | ESP | Jairo |

| No. | Pos. | Nation | Player |
|---|---|---|---|
| 18 | DF | GER | Daniel Brosinski |
| 19 | MF | COL | Elkin Soto |
| 20 | MF | SUI | Fabian Frei |
| 21 | FW | AUT | Karim Onisiwo |
| 23 | GK | ITA | Gianluca Curci |
| 24 | DF | FRA | Gaëtan Bussmann |
| 26 | DF | GER | Niko Bungert |
| 27 | MF | GER | Christian Clemens (on loan from Schalke 04) |
| 29 | FW | GER | Devante Parker |
| 32 | FW | ARG | Pablo de Blasis |
| 33 | GK | GER | Jannik Huth |
| 42 | DF | GER | Alexander Hack |
| 45 | MF | GER | Suat Serdar |
| 47 | MF | GER | Philipp Klement |

=== On loan ===
Note: Flags indicate national team as defined under FIFA eligibility rules; some limited exceptions apply. Players may hold more than one non-FIFA nationality.

| No. | Pos. | Nation | Player |
|---|---|---|---|
| 28 | MF | BUL | Todor Nedelev (at Botev Plovdiv) |
| 31 | FW | GER | Florian Niederlechner (at SC Freiburg) |
| 25 | MF | DEN | Niki Zimling (at FSV Frankfurt) |
| — | MF | GER | Maximilian Beister (at 1860 Munich) |
| — | GK | GER | Robin Zentner (at Holstein Kiel) |
| — | MF | KOS | Besar Halimi (at FSV Frankfurt) |

== Competitions ==
Win Draw Loss

=== Bundesliga ===
==== League table ====
| Pos | Team | Pld | W | D | L | GF | GA | GD | Pts | Qualification or relegation |
|---|---|---|---|---|---|---|---|---|---|---|
| 4 | Borussia Mönchengladbach | 34 | 17 | 4 | 13 | 67 | 50 | +17 | 55 | Qualification for the Champions League play-off round |
| 5 | Schalke 04 | 34 | 15 | 7 | 12 | 51 | 49 | +2 | 52 | Qualification for the Europa League group stage (Note: Since the winners of the 2015–16 DFB-Pokal, Bayern Munich, qualified for the Champions League based on league position, the Europa League group stage spot was passed to the sixth-placed team, Mainz 05; and the Europa League third qualifying round spot was passed to the seventh-placed team, Hertha BSC.) |
| 6 | Mainz 05 | 34 | 14 | 8 | 12 | 46 | 42 | +4 | 50 | Qualification for the Europa League group stage |
| 7 | Hertha BSC | 34 | 14 | 8 | 12 | 42 | 42 | 0 | 50 | Qualification for the Europa League third qualifying round |
| 8 | VfL Wolfsburg | 34 | 12 | 9 | 13 | 47 | 49 | −2 | 45 | |

Source: DFB
Rules for classification: 1) Points; 2) Goal difference; 3) Goals scored; 4) Head-to-head points; 5) Head-to-head goal difference; 6) Head-to-head away goals scored; 7) Away goals scored; 8) Play-offs.

==== Results summary ====
| Overall | | | | | | | | Home | | | | | | Away | | | | | |
| Pld | W | D | L | GF | GA | GD | Pts | W | D | L | GF | GA | GD | W | D | L | GF | GA | GD |
|---|---|---|---|---|---|---|---|---|---|---|---|---|---|---|---|---|---|---|---|
| 34 | 14 | 8 | 12 | 46 | 42 | +4 | 50 | 8 | 4 | 5 | 23 | 18 | +5 | 6 | 4 | 7 | 23 | 24 | −1 |

Last updated: 7 May 2016.
Source: Bundesliga

==== Results by round ====
| Round | 1 | 2 | 3 | 4 | 5 | 6 | 7 | 8 | 9 | 10 | 11 | 12 | 13 | 14 | 15 | 16 | 17 | 18 | 19 | 20 | 21 | 22 | 23 | 24 | 25 | 26 | 27 | 28 | 29 | 30 | 31 | 32 | 33 | 34 |
|---|---|---|---|---|---|---|---|---|---|---|---|---|---|---|---|---|---|---|---|---|---|---|---|---|---|---|---|---|---|---|---|---|---|---|
| Ground | H | A | H | A | H | A | H | A | H | H | A | H | A | H | A | H | A | A | H | A | H | A | H | A | H | A | A | H | A | H | A | H | A | H |
| Result | L | W | W | L | W | L | L | W | L | L | D | W | D | W | W | D | L | L | W | W | W | L | W | W | D | L | D | W | D | L | L | D | W | D |
| Position | 13 | 8 | 5 | 10 | 7 | 9 | 12 | 8 | 11 | 13 | 12 | 9 | 11 | 9 | 7 | 7 | 8 | 8 | 8 | 7 | 6 | 7 | 5 | 5 | 5 | 6 | 7 | 6 | 6 | 6 | 6 | 7 | 5 | 6 |

Updated to match(es) played on 7 May 2016. Source: Bundesliga
A = Away; H = Home; W = Win; D = Draw; L = Loss

==== Matches ====
| 15 August 2015 1 | Mainz 05 | 0–1 | FC Ingolstadt | Mainz |
| 15:30 CEST (UTC+02:00) | Brosinski (yellow card) 39'; Baumgartlinger (yellow card) 64' | Report | Leckie (yellow card) 44'; Hübner (yellow card) 52'; Hinterseer 66'; Engel (yellow card) 88' | Stadium: Coface Arena; Attendance: 27,152; Referee: Guido Winkmann |

| 23 August 2015 2 | Borussia Mönchengladbach | 1–2 | Mainz 05 | Mönchengladbach |
| 17:30 CEST (UTC+02:00) | Herrmann 54'; Wendt (yellow card) 78'; Korb (yellow card) 90' | Report | Jairo 42'; Frei (yellow card) 44'; Clemens 79' | Stadium: Stadion im Borussia-Park; Attendance: 50,172; Referee: Deniz Aytekin |

| 29 August 2015 3 | Mainz 05 | 3–0 | Hannover 96 | Mainz |
| 15:30 CEST (UTC+02:00) | Muto 15', 29'; Mallı 47' | Report | Prib (yellow card) 67'; Sorg (yellow card) 85' | Stadium: Coface Arena; Attendance: 26,872; Referee: Peter Sippel |

| 13 September 2015 4 | Schalke 04 | 2–1 | Mainz 05 | Gelsenkirchen |
| 17:30 CEST (UTC+02:00) | Matip 37', (yellow card) 84'; Huntelaar 61' | Report | Bengtsson (yellow card) 24'; Latza (yellow card) 40'; Mallı 42'; Bell (yellow card) 73' | Stadium: Veltins-Arena; Attendance: 60,083; Referee: Robert Hartmann |

| 18 September 2015 5 | Mainz 05 | 3–1 | TSG Hoffenheim | Mainz |
| 20:30 CEST (UTC+02:00) | Mallı 18', 61', 68'; Niederlechner (yellow card) 90' | Report | Schmid 13'; Schär (yellow card) 41'; Bičakčić (yellow card) 49' | Stadium: Coface Arena; Attendance: 28,973; Referee: Daniel Siebert |

| 26 September 2015 6 | Bayer Leverkusen | 1–0 | Mainz 05 | Leverkusen |
| 20:00 CEST (UTC+02:00) | Bender (yellow card) 51'; Hernández 69'; Donati (yellow card) 75'; Ramalho (yellow card) 84' | Report | | Stadium: BayArena; Attendance: 24,805; Referee: Marco Fritz |

| 2 October 2015 7 | Mainz 05 | 0–3 | Bayern Munich | Mainz |
| 15:30 CEST (UTC+02:00) | Baumgartlinger (yellow card) 28' | Report | Alonso (yellow card) 27'; Lewandowski 51', 63'; Coman 68' | Stadium: Coface Arena; Attendance: 34,000; Referee: Bastian Dankert |

| 17 October 2015 8 | Darmstadt 98 | 2–3 | Mainz 05 | Darmstadt |
| 20:30 CEST (UTC+02:00) | Heller 27'; Caldirola (yellow card) 52'; Sailer 57' | Report | Bell 15'; Latza (yellow card) 21'; Mallı 24' de Blasis 64'; Karius (yellow card) 70' | Stadium: Merck-Stadion am Böllenfalltor; Attendance: 17,000; Referee: Florian Meyer |

| 23 October 2015 9 | Mainz 05 | 0–2 | Borussia Dortmund | Mainz |
| 20:30 CEST (UTC+02:00) | Jairo (yellow card) 59'; Brosinski (yellow card) 68' | Report | Mkhitaryan (yellow card) 10', (goal) 82'; Reus 18' | Stadium: Coface Arena; Attendance: 34,000; Referee: Tobias Stieler |

| 31 October 2015 10 | Mainz 05 | 1–3 | Werder Bremen | Mainz |
| 15:30 CEST (UTC+02:00) | Balogun (yellow card) 62'; Jairo (yellow card) 79'; Muto 90' | Report | Fritz (yellow card) 11'; Ujah 39', 44'; Bartels 45+3' | Stadium: Coface Arena; Attendance: 30,837; Referee: Robert Hartmann |

| 7 November 2015 11 | FC Augsburg | 3–3 | Mainz 05 | Augsburg |
| 15:30 CET (UTC+01:00) | Verhaegh 42' (pen.); Koo 50', (yellow card) 63'; Ji (yellow card) 62'; Kohr (yellow card) 69'; Bobadilla 81' | Report | Muto 18', 30', 90+3' de Blasis (yellow card) 41'; Jara (yellow card) 44'; Latza (yellow card) 47' | Stadium: WWK ARENA; Attendance: 27,200; Referee: Marco Fritz |

| 21 November 2015 12 | Mainz 05 | 2–0 | VfL Wolfsburg | Mainz |
| 15:30 CET (UTC+01:00) | de Blasis 31'; Jairo (yellow card) 34'; Latza (yellow card) 57'; Mallı 75' | Report | Draxler (red card) 13'; Luiz Gustavo (yellow card) 35'; Caligiuri (yellow card) 76'; Dante (yellow card) 80' | Stadium: Coface Arena; Attendance: 26,331; Referee: Daniel Siebert |

| 29 November 2015 13 | 1. FC Köln | 0–0 | Mainz 05 | Cologne |
| 15:30 CET (UTC+01:00) | Modeste (yellow card) 34' | Report | Muto (yellow card) 61' | Stadium: RheinEnergieSTADION; Attendance: 46,700; Referee: Wolfgang Stark |

| 5 December 2015 14 | Mainz 05 | 2–1 | Eintracht Frankfurt | Mainz |
| 15:45 CET (UTC+01:00) | Muto 5'; Mallı 42'; Latza (yellow card) 62'; Hack (yellow card) 65'; Niederlechner (yellow card) 83'; Baumgartlinger (yellow card) 90+3' | Report | Abraham (yellow card) 25'; Meier (yellow card) 28' (yellow-red card) 40'; Seferovic 61'; Gaćinović (yellow card) 89' | Stadium: Coface Arena; Attendance: 33,098; Referee: Bastian Dankert |

| 13 December 2015 15 | Hamburger SV | 1–3 | Mainz 05 | Hamburg |
| 15:30 CET (UTC+01:00) | Jung (yellow card) 44'; Djourou (yellow card) 84', (goal) 90' | Report | Jairo 16', 51'; Baumgartlinger (yellow card) 43'; Clemens 76' | Stadium: Volksparkstadion; Attendance: 51,698; Referee: Benjamin Brand |

| 15 December 2015 16 | Mainz 05 | 0–0 | VfB Stuttgart | Mainz |
| 20:30 CET (UTC+01:00) | Bungert (yellow card) 36' | Report | Rupp (yellow card) 88' | Stadium: Coface Arena; Attendance: 29,104; Referee: Felix Zwayer |

| 20 December 2015 17 | Hertha BSC | 2–0 | Mainz 05 | Berlin |
| 15:30 CET (UTC+01:00) | Darida 34'; Kalou 54' | Report | | Stadium: Olympiastadion; Attendance: 39,835; Referee: Peter Sippel |

| 23 January 2016 18 | FC Ingolstadt | 1–0 | Mainz 05 | Ingolstadt |
| 15:30 CET (UTC+01:00) | Hartmann 41' (pen.); Groß (yellow card) 52'; Morales (yellow card) 60' | Report | Latza (yellow card) 79'; Córdoba (yellow card) 88' | Stadium: Audi Sportpark; Attendance: 13,500; Referee: Florian Meyer |

| 29 January 2016 19 | Mainz 05 | 1–0 | Borussia Mönchengladbach | Mainz |
| 20:30 CET (UTC+01:00) | Clemens 21' | Report | Nordtveit (yellow card) 63'; Korb (yellow card) 80' | Stadium: Coface Arena; Attendance: 32,015; Referee: Benjamin Brand |

| 6 February 2016 20 | Hannover 96 | 0–1 | Mainz 05 | Hanover |
| 15:30 CET (UTC+01:00) | Milošević (yellow card) 81' | Report | Bell (yellow card) 2'; Jairo 24'; Muto (yellow card) 58' | Stadium: HDI-Arena; Attendance: 35,596; Referee: Robert Hartmann |

| 12 February 2016 21 | Mainz 05 | 2–1 | Schalke 04 | Mainz |
| 20:30 CET (UTC+01:00) | Bussmann 33'; Latza (yellow card) 43'; Baumgartlinger 79'; Donati (yellow card) 81'; Balogun (yellow card) 90+3' | Report | Caiçara (yellow card) 45+1'; Belhanda 46' | Stadium: Coface Arena; Attendance: 32,107; Referee: Manuel Gräfe |

| 20 February 2016 22 | TSG Hoffenheim | 3–2 | Mainz 05 | Sinsheim |
| 15:30 CET (UTC+01:00) | Amiri 13'; Rudy (yellow card) 14'; Uth 68', 76' | Report | Córdoba 11'; Balogun (yellow card) 27'; Jairo 78', (yellow card) 90+1' | Stadium: Wirsol Rhein-Neckar-Arena; Attendance: 24,019; Referee: Günter Perl |

| 28 February 2016 23 | Mainz 05 | 3–1 | Bayer Leverkusen | Mainz |
| 17:30 CET (UTC+01:00) | Mallı 14', 58' (pen.); Bussmann (yellow card) 25'; Córdoba 32' | Report | Jedvaj (yellow card) 57'; Hernández 65' | Stadium: Coface Arena; Attendance: 26,557; Referee: Deniz Aytekin |

| 2 March 2016 24 | Bayern Munich | 1–2 | Mainz 05 | Munich |
| 20:00 CET (UTC+01:00) | Rafinha (yellow card) 50'; Robben 64' | Report | Jairo 26'; Balogun (yellow card) 62'; Bussmann (yellow card) 84'; Córdoba 86' | Stadium: Allianz Arena; Attendance: 75,000; Referee: Sascha Stegemann |

| 6 March 2016 25 | Mainz 05 | 0–0 | Darmstadt 98 | Mainz |
| 15:30 CET (UTC+01:00) | Donati (red card) 57' | Report | Jungwirth (yellow card) 42'; Gondorf (yellow card) 45'; Rajković (yellow card) 63'; Niemeyer (yellow card) 84'; Vrančić (yellow card) 86' | Stadium: Coface Arena; Attendance: 34,000; Referee: Benjamin Brand |

| 13 March 2016 26 | Borussia Dortmund | 2–0 | Mainz 05 | Dortmund |
| 17:30 CET (UTC+01:00) | Reus 30'; Kagawa 73' | Report | | Stadium: Signal Iduna Park; Attendance: 81,000; Referee: Deniz Aytekin |

| 19 March 2016 27 | Werder Bremen | 1–1 | Mainz 05 | Bremen |
| 15:30 CET (UTC+01:00) | Fritz (yellow card) 38'; Pizarro 45+3' (pen.); Djilobodji (yellow card) 62' | Report | Baumgartlinger 38'; Jairo (yellow card) 61'; Bell (yellow card) 89' | Stadium: Weserstadion; Attendance: 38,416; Referee: Manuel Gräfe |

| 2 April 2016 28 | Mainz 05 | 4–2 | FC Augsburg | Mainz |
| 15:30 CEST (UTC+02:00) | Clemens 13', 76' de Blasis 24', 53'; Bussmann (yellow card) 54' | Report | Caiuby 9'; Koo 40', (yellow card) 72'; Feulner (yellow card) 57' | Stadium: Coface Arena; Attendance: 31,780; Referee: Patrick Ittrich |

| 9 April 2016 29 | VfL Wolfsburg | 1–1 | Mainz 05 | Wolfsburg |
| 18:30 CEST (UTC+02:00) | Naldo (yellow card) 27'; Schürrle 53'; Henrique (yellow card) 84'; Dante (yellow card) 86' (yellow-red card) 90+1' | Report | Latza (yellow card) 3'; Jairo 66'; Clemens (yellow card) 72' | Stadium: Volkswagen Arena; Attendance: 27,844; Referee: Günter Perl |

| 17 April 2016 30 | Mainz 05 | 2–3 | 1. FC Köln | Mainz |
| 17:30 CEST (UTC+02:00) | Córdoba 8'; Balogun 49'; Donati (yellow card) 67' | Report | Mavraj (yellow card) 48'; Risse 64'; Jojić 74'; Gerhardt (yellow card) 79'; Modeste 83' | Stadium: Coface Arena; Attendance: 33,275; Referee: Peter Sippel |

| 24 April 2016 31 | Eintracht Frankfurt | 2–1 | Mainz 05 | Frankfurt |
| 17:30 CEST (UTC+02:00) | Russ (yellow card) 17', (goal) 28'; Ben-Hatira (yellow card) 44'; Huszti (yellow card) 52'; Bell 84' (o.g.); Zambrano (yellow card) 89' | Report | Brosinski 18', (yellow card) 27'; Baumgartlinger (yellow card) 36'; Donati (yellow card) 45+1'; Córdoba (yellow card) 60' | Stadium: Commerzbank-Arena; Attendance: 50,300; Referee: Felix Zwayer |

| 30 April 2016 32 | Mainz 05 | 0–0 | Hamburger SV | Mainz |
| 15:30 CEST (UTC+02:00) | | Report | Spahić (yellow card) 22'; Bahoui (yellow card) 61'; Kačar (yellow card) 63' | Stadium: Coface Arena; Attendance: 34,000; Referee: Guido Winkmann |

| 7 May 2016 33 | VfB Stuttgart | 1–3 | Mainz 05 | Stuttgart |
| 15:30 CEST (UTC+02:00) | Gentner 6'; Didavi (yellow card) 18'; Šunjić (yellow card) 70'; Baumgartl (yellow card) 90' | Report | Bungert (yellow card) 33'; Mallı 37'; Baumgartlinger (yellow card) 53'; Córdoba 53'; Onisiwo 77' | Stadium: Mercedes-Benz Arena; Attendance: 60,000; Referee: Deniz Aytekin |

| 14 May 2016 34 | Mainz 05 | 0–0 | Hertha BSC | Mainz |
| 15:30 CEST (UTC+02:00) | Baumgartlinger (yellow card) 22'; Onisiwo (yellow card) 49'; Donati (yellow card) 74' | Report | Lustenberger (yellow card) 64'; Stark (yellow card) 75' (yellow-red card) 87'; Schieber (yellow card) 90+4'; Weiser (yellow card) 90+5' | Stadium: Coface Arena; Attendance: 33,800; Referee: Sascha Stegemann |

=== DFB-Pokal ===
| 9 August 2015 Round 1 | Energie Cottbus | 0–3 | Mainz 05 | Cottbus |
| 20:30 CEST (UTC+02:00) | | Report | Frei 30'; Jairo 33'; Clemens 62' | Stadium: Stadion der Freundschaft; Attendance: 11,123; Referee: Robert Hartmann |

| 27 October 2015 Round 2 | Mainz 05 | 1–2 | 1860 Munich | Mainz |
| 19:00 CET (UTC+01:00) | Schindler 6' (o.g.); Niederlechner (yellow card) 25'; Bengtsson (red card) 45' | Report | Yegenoglu (yellow card) 51'; Neudecker (yellow card) 61'; Degenek (yellow card) 68'; Mugoša 70'; Okotie 77'; Kagelmacher (yellow card) 87' | Stadium: Coface Arena; Attendance: 17,617; Referee: Harm Osmers |
