= Gaëtan Bussmann =

French footballer (born 1991)

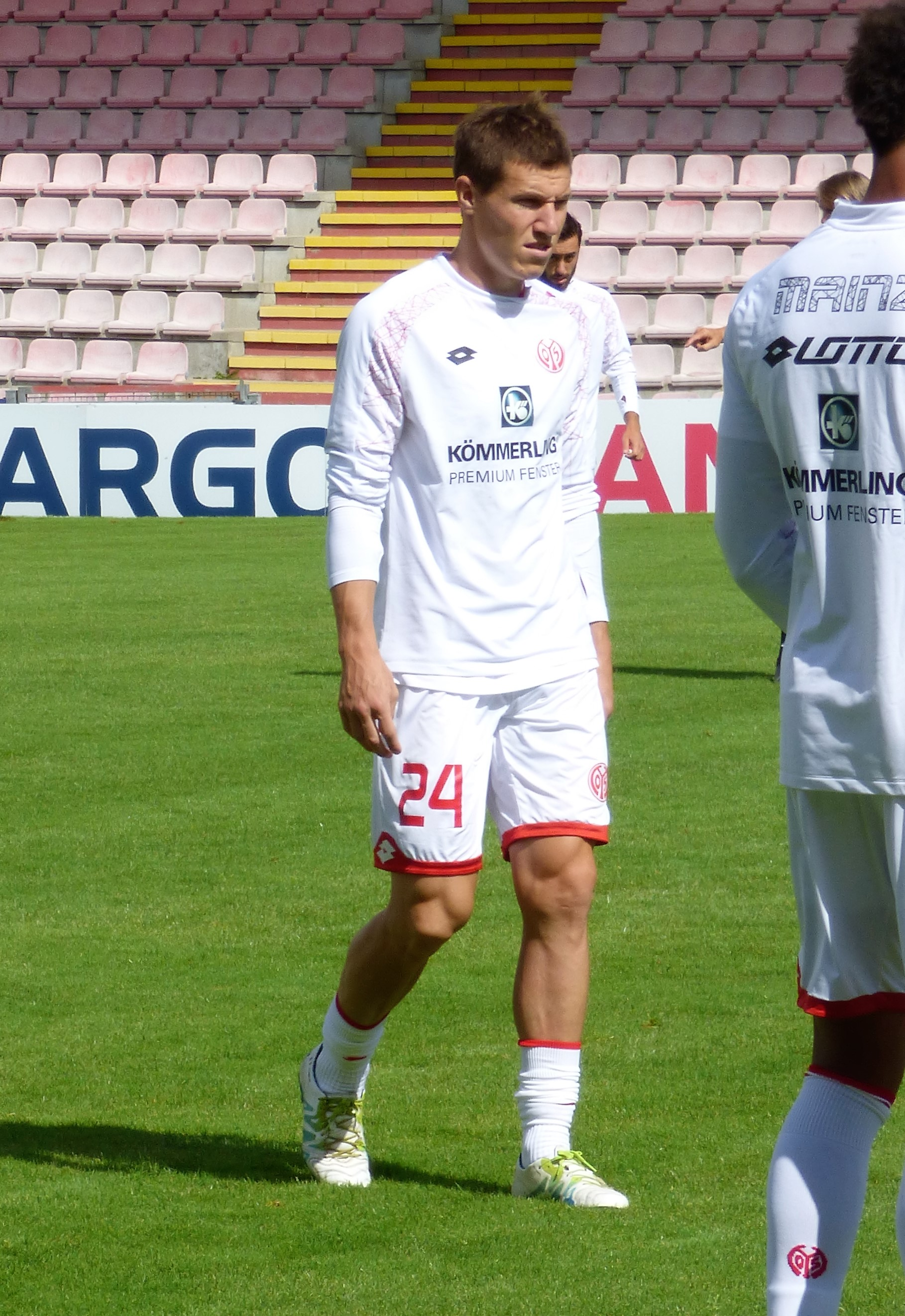
- Bussmann in 2016

Personal information
- Date of birth: 2 February 1991 (age 35)
- Place of birth: Épinal, France
- Height: 1.84 m (6 ft 0 in)
- Position: Left-back

Team information
- Current team: Épinal
- Number: 24

Youth career
- 1997–2004: Épinal
- 2004–2010: Metz

Senior career*
Years	Team	Apps	(Gls)
2010–2015	Metz II	22	(3)
2010–2015	Metz	120	(11)
2012	→ Épinal (loan)	18	(1)
2015–2019	Mainz 05	28	(1)
2018	→ SC Freiburg (loan)	0	(0)
2018	→ SC Freiburg II (loan)	0	(0)
2018–2019	Mainz 05 II	3	(0)
2019	Guingamp B	2	(0)
2019–2020	Guingamp	8	(0)
2020–2022	Erzgebirge Aue	32	(2)
2022–2024	Nancy	61	(5)
2024–	Épinal	2	(0)

International career
2009	France U18	3	(0)
2009–2010	France U19	9	(0)
2011	France U20	3	(0)
- * Club domestic league appearances and goals as of 23 August 2024

Gaëtan Bussmann (born 2 February 1991) is a French professional footballer who plays for Championnat National 1 club Épinal. He plays as a left-back and is also capable of playing in the centre of defence. Bussmann is a French youth international and has represented his nation at U18 and U19 level. He was a part of the team that won the 2010 European U19 Championship on home soil.

== Career ==
=== Early career and Metz ===
Born in Épinal, Bussmann began his career at hometown club Épinal and joined Metz in 2004 at the age of 13. While in the club's youth academy, he won the 2009–10 Coupe Gambardella after the club's under-19 team defeated Sochaux 5–4 on penalties in the final. On 4 June 2010, Bussmann signed his first professional contract agreeing to a five-year deal with Metz until June 2015. He made his professional debut on 20 August 2010 in a league match against Vannes starting in the left back position.

=== Mainz 05 ===
In August 2015, Bussmann left Metz to join German Bundesliga side Mainz 05 for a transfer fee of believed to be €1 million. He signed a two-year contract including an extension option and replaced Park Joo-ho who had moved from Mainz to Borussia Dortmund.

In January 2018, Bussmann joined league rivals SC Freiburg on loan until the end of the season. Freiburg were also given an option to sign him permanently. He did not make an appearance during his half season there.

In summer 2018, Bussmann returned to Mainz 05. On 29 September, he earned his first Bundesliga match after 574 days, deputising for Aarón who had played the first five matches of the season.

=== Nancy ===
On 22 July 2022, Bussmann signed a two-year contract with Nancy.

== Career statistics ==
As of 22 July 2022

Appearances and goals by club, season and competition
Club	Season	League			National cup		League cup		Continental		Total	
Club	Season	Division	Apps	Goals	Apps	Goals	Apps	Goals	Apps	Goals	Apps	Goals
Metz II	2010–11	CFA	11	3	—		—		—		11	3
Metz II	2011–12	CFA	10	0	—		—		—		10	0
Metz II	2014–15	CFA	1	0	—		—		—		1	0
Metz II	Total		22	3	—		—		—		22	3
Metz	2010–11	Ligue 2	12	0	4	0	0	0	—		16	0
Metz	2011–12	Ligue 2	2	0	0	0	0	0	—		2	0
Metz	2012–13	National	35	4	2	0	3	2	—		40	6
Metz	2013–14	Ligue 2	36	4	0	0	0	0	—		36	4
Metz	2014–15	Ligue 1	31	2	2	0	1	0	—		34	2
Metz	2015–16	Ligue 2	4	1	0	0	2	1	—		6	2
Metz	Total		120	11	8	0	6	3	—		134	14
Épinal (loan)	2011–12	National	18	1	0	0	0	0	—		18	1
Mainz 05	2015–16	Bundesliga	13	1	0	0	—		—		13	1
Mainz 05	2016–17	Bundesliga	14	0	1	0	—		5 (Note: Appearances in the Europa League)	0	20	0
Mainz 05	2017–18	Bundesliga	0	0	0	0	—		—		0	0
Mainz 05	2018–19	Bundesliga	1	0	1	0	—		—		2	0
Mainz 05	Total		28	1	2	0	—		5	0	35	1
SC Freiburg (loan)	2017–18	Bundesliga	0	0	0	0	—		—		0	0
SC Freiburg II (loan)	2017–18	Regionalliga	1	0	—		—		—		1	0
Mainz 05 II	2018–19	Regionalliga	3	0	—		—		—		3	0
Guingamp II	2019–20	National 2	2	0	—		—		—		2	0
Guingamp	2019–20	Ligue 2	8	0	1	0	0	0	—		9	0
Erzgebirge Aue	2020–21	2. Bundesliga	15	1	0	0	—		—		15	1
Erzgebirge Aue	2021–22	2. Bundesliga	17	1	0	0	—		—		17	1
Erzgebirge Aue	Total		32	2	0	0	—		—		32	2
Nancy	2022–23	National	0	0	0	0	—		—		0	0
Career total			234	18	11	0	6	3	5	0	256	21

== Honours ==
Metz

- Coupe Gambardella: 2009–10

France U19

- UEFA European Under-19 Championship: 2010
