= Fallou Diagne =

Senegalese footballer (born 1989)

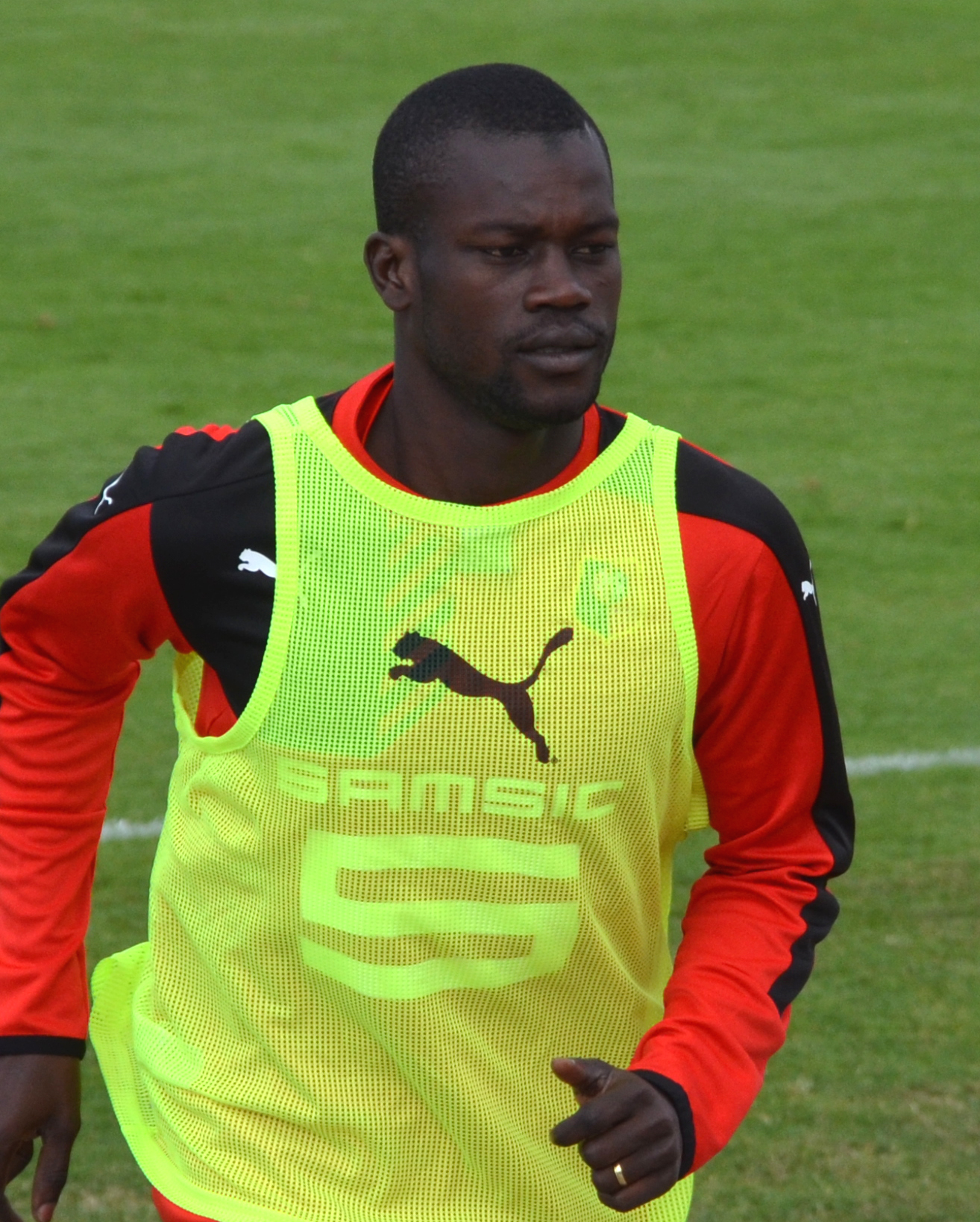
- Diagne with Rennes in 2015

Personal information
- Full name: Serigne Fallou Diagne
- Date of birth: 14 August 1989 (age 37)
- Place of birth: Pikine, Senegal
- Height: 1.85 m (6 ft 1 in)
- Position: Centre-back

Youth career
- –2007: Génération Foot
- 2007–2008: Metz

Senior career*
| Years | Team | Apps | (Gls) |
| 2008–2012 | Metz | 58 | (3) |
| 2010–2011 | Metz II | 2 | (0) |
| 2012–2014 | SC Freiburg | 57 | (2) |
| 2013–2014 | SC Freiburg II | 1 | (1) |
| 2014–2016 | Rennes | 37 | (5) |
| 2014–2015 | Rennes II | 1 | (0) |
| 2016–2018 | Werder Bremen | 2 | (0) |
| 2016–2018 | Werder Bremen II | 3 | (0) |
| 2017–2018 | → Metz (loan) | 41 | (1) |
| 2018–2020 | Konyaspor | 17 | (0) |
| 2021–2022 | Vllaznia Shkodër | 26 | (2) |
| 2022–2023 | Chennaiyin | 19 | (0) |
| 2023 | Dhangadhi F.C. | 10 | (0) |

International career
| 2016– | Senegal | 4 | (0) |
- * Club domestic league appearances and goals

Serigne Fallou Diagne (born 14 August 1989) is a Senegalese professional footballer who plays as a defender for the Senegal national football team.

== Club career ==
Diagne began his career with Génération Foot in Dakar before being scouted by FC Metz in January 2007.

In late August 2014, he joined Stade Rennes from SC Freiburg for a reported transfer fee of €1.5 million signing a three-year contract.

In early July 2016, Diagne signed for Werder Bremen. The transfer fee was estimated at €1.5 to 2 million. On 10 January 2017, Diagne joined Ligue 1 club Metz on loan, rejoining his former club until the end of the 2017–18 season.

In August 2018, Diagne joined Süper Lig side Konyaspor signing a two-year contract with the option of a third year.

== International career ==
Diagne debuted for the Senegal national team in a friendly 2–0 win over Rwanda on 28 May 2016.

== Career statistics ==
=== Club ===
As of 19 April 2023 As of October 28, Fallou Diagne has joined the club Dhangadhi FC in Nepal. He will play in the Nepal Super League.

Appearances and goals by club, season and competition
| Club | Season | League | | | National Cup | | League Cup | | Continental | | Total | |
| Club | Season | Division | Apps | Goals | Apps | Goals | Apps | Goals | Apps | Goals | Apps | Goals |
|---|---|---|---|---|---|---|---|---|---|---|---|---|
| Metz | 2008–09 | Ligue 2 | 6 | 0 | 0 | 0 | 0 | 0 | — | | 6 | 0 |
| Metz | 2009–10 | Ligue 2 | 8 | 0 | 0 | 0 | 2 (Note: Appearance(s) in Coupe de la Ligue) | 0 | — | | 10 | 0 |
| Metz | 2010–11 | Ligue 2 | 31 | 1 | 4 (Note: Appearance(s) in Coupe de France) | 1 | 1 | 0 | — | | 36 | 2 |
| Metz | 2011–12 | Ligue 2 | 13 | 2 | 1 | 1 | 1 | 0 | — | | 15 | 3 |
| Metz | Metz total | | 58 | 3 | 5 | 2 | 4 | 0 | 0 | 0 | 67 | 5 |
| Metz II | 2010–11 | National 2 | 2 | 0 | 0 | 0 | 0 | 0 | — | | 2 | 0 |
| SC Freiburg | 2011–12 | Bundesliga | 15 | 1 | 0 | 0 | 0 | 0 | — | | 15 | 1 |
| SC Freiburg | 2012–13 | Bundesliga | 30 | 1 | 4 (Note: Appearance(s) in DFB-Pokal) | 0 | 0 | 0 | — | | 34 | 1 |
| SC Freiburg | 2013–14 | Bundesliga | 12 | 0 | 1 | 0 | 0 | 0 | 3 (Note: Appearance(s) in UEFA Europa League) | 0 | 16 | 0 |
| SC Freiburg | 2014–15 | Bundesliga | 0 | 0 | 0 | 0 | 0 | 0 | — | | 0 | 0 |
| SC Freiburg | SC Freiburg total | | 57 | 2 | 5 | 0 | 0 | 0 | 3 | 0 | 65 | 2 |
| SC Freiburg II | 2013–14 | Regionalliga Südwest | 1 | 1 | 0 | 0 | 0 | 0 | — | | 1 | 1 |
| Rennes | 2014–15 | Ligue 1 | 15 | 0 | 2 | 0 | 1 | 0 | — | | 18 | 0 |
| Rennes | 2015–16 | Ligue 1 | 22 | 5 | 1 | 0 | 1 | 1 | — | | 24 | 6 |
| Rennes | Rennes total | | 37 | 5 | 3 | 0 | 2 | 1 | 0 | 0 | 42 | 6 |
| Rennes II | 2014–15 | National 3 | 1 | 0 | 0 | 0 | 0 | 0 | — | | 1 | 0 |
| Werder Bremen | 2016–17 | Bundesliga | 2 | 0 | 0 | 0 | 0 | 0 | — | | 2 | 0 |
| Werder Bremen II | 2016–17 | 3. Liga | 3 | 0 | 0 | 0 | 0 | 0 | — | | 3 | 0 |
| Metz (loan) | 2016–17 | Ligue 1 | 12 | 0 | 0 | 0 | 0 | 0 | — | | 12 | 0 |
| Metz (loan) | 2017–18 | Ligue 1 | 29 | 1 | 1 | 0 | 0 | 0 | — | | 30 | 1 |
| Metz (loan) | Metz total | | 41 | 1 | 1 | 0 | 0 | 0 | 0 | 0 | 42 | 1 |
| Konyaspor | 2018–19 | Süper Lig | 13 | 0 | 1 (Note: Appearance(s) in Turkish Cup) | 0 | — | | — | | 14 | 0 |
| Konyaspor | 2019–20 | Süper Lig | 4 | 0 | 1 | 0 | — | | — | | 5 | 0 |
| Konyaspor | Konyaspor total | | 17 | 0 | 2 | 0 | 0 | 0 | 0 | 0 | 19 | 0 |
| Vllaznia Shkodër | 2021–22 | Albanian League | 26 | 2 | 3 (Note: Appearance(s) in Albanian Cup) | 0 | 1 (Note: Appearance(s) in Albanian Supercup) | 0 | — | | 30 | 2 |
| Chennaiyin | 2022–23 | Indian Super League | 19 | 0 | 3 (Note: Appearance(s) in Super Cup) | 0 | 3 (Note: Appearance(s) in Durand Cup) | 0 | — | | 25 | 0 |
| Career total | | | 264 | 14 | 21 | 2 | 13 | 1 | 3 | 0 | 301 | 17 |

=== International ===
As of matches played till 23 March 2018

| National team | Year | Apps | Goals |
|---|---|---|---|
| Senegal | 2016 | 2 | 0 |
| Senegal | 2018 | 1 | 0 |
| Total | | 3 | 0 |
