= Romain Métanire =

Malagasy footballer (born 1990)

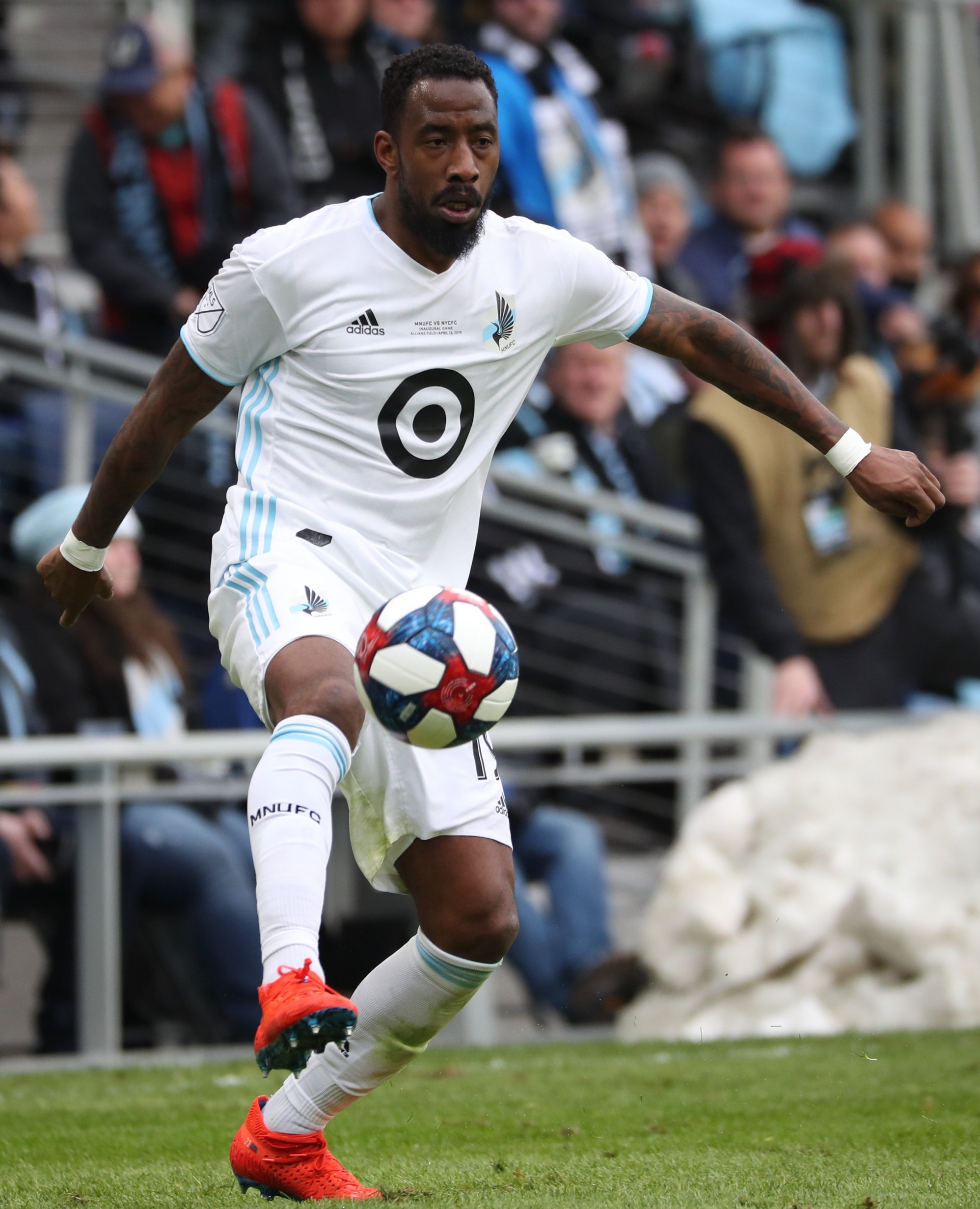
- Métanire with Minnesota United in 2019

Personal information
- Date of birth: 28 March 1990 (age 36)
- Place of birth: Metz, France
- Height: 1.78 m (5 ft 10 in)
- Position: Defender

Senior career*
Years	Team	Apps	(Gls)
2010–2016	Metz II	32	(2)
2010–2016	Metz	161	(2)
2016–2017	KV Kortrijk	18	(0)
2017–2019	Reims	59	(0)
2017–2019	Reims II	2	(0)
2019–2022	Minnesota United	77	(1)
2023	Seraing	10	(0)
2024	Spokane Velocity	6	(2)

International career^{‡}
2018–	Madagascar	27	(0)
- * Club domestic league appearances and goals as of 24 November 2024 ‡ National team caps and goals as of 22 January 2024

Romain Métanire (born 28 March 1990) is a professional footballer who plays as a defender for Spokane Velocity.

He has previously played for Minnesota United FC, French clubs FC Metz, Stade de Reims (with whom he won Ligue 2 in 2017–18), and Belgian club KV Kortrijk. Born in France, he plays for the Madagascar national team.

== Club career ==
=== Metz ===
Métanire was born in Metz, but has origins in Réunion. Having joined FC Metz at the age of six, he started his career in the club's reserve team and made his debut in the Championnat de France amateur (CFA) on 11 October 2008, coming on as a substitute in a 1–1 draw away at Colmar. He made three further substitute appearances in the 2008–09 season as the reserve side was relegated to the CFA 2. He made his first start for Metz B in the 5–2 home win over Pontarlier on 15 August 2009. He went on to play 19 matches during the campaign, becoming a regular fixture in the team that gained promotion back to the CFA as winners of their group. He also scored the first goal of his career in the 2–1 victory away at Troyes B on 21 March 2010.

As a result of his performances in the reserve team, Métanire was selected on the substitutes' bench for the match away at Clermont Foot on 29 October 2010. He entered play in the 89th minute, replacing Belgian midfielder Gaëtan Englebert. He again appeared as a late substitute the following week in the home defeat to Le Mans, before returning to the B team. He played 29 CFA matches for the reserves during the 2010–11 season. Métanire was handed his first senior start in the final Ligue 2 match of the campaign, as Metz were beaten 4–3 away to Evian TG.

In the 2011–12 season, Métanire established himself as Metz' first-choice right-back, starting in all of the side's first 21 matches of the campaign.

On 5 February 2016, he scored a goal against AS Nancy in injury time. In reference to the occasion, t-shirts were sold with the message "Je t’aime comme un but de Métanire à la 91e". In his time at Metz, he made 180 league appearances scoring two goals.

=== Kortrijk ===
On 15 July 2016, Métanire left Metz for Belgian club KV Kortrijk.

=== Reims ===
On 18 January 2017, after just six months with Kortrijk, Métanire returned to his native France joining Stade Reims on a 1.5-year contract.

Métanire helped Stade de Reims win the 2017–18 Ligue 2 and promote to the Ligue 1 for the 2018–19 season.

=== Minnesota United ===
On 25 January 2019, Métanire signed with MLS club Minnesota United. Following the 2022 season, his contract option was declined by Minnesota.

=== Seraing ===
On 6 September 2023, Métanire signed a one-year contract with Seraing in Belgium. On 1 January 2024, Métanire's contract was terminated as he asked to rejoin his family in the US.

=== Spokane Velocity ===
Métanire joined USL League One expansion club Spokane Velocity on 23 January 2024. He scored the first home goal five minutes into the home opener for Spokane in a 2-1 victory. Spokane opted not to renew his contract following their 2024 season.

== International career ==
Métanire was born in France, and is of Malagasy descent. He was called up to the Madagascar national team on 11 August 2018. He made his debut for Madagascar in a 2–2 2019 Africa Cup of Nations qualification tie with Senegal on 9 September 2018.

== Career statistics ==
=== Club ===
As of match played 8 December 2020

Appearances and goals by club, season and competition
Club	Season	League			National cup		League cup		Other		Total	
Club	Season	Division	Apps	Goals	Apps	Goals	Apps	Goals	Apps	Goals	Apps	Goals
Metz	2010–11	Ligue 2	3	0	0	0	0	0	—		3	0
Metz	2011–12	Ligue 2	32	0	2	0	1	0	—		35	0
Metz	2012–13	Championnat National	36	0	2	0	3	0	—		41	0
Metz	2013–14	Ligue 2	33	0	0	0	1	0	—		34	0
Metz	2014–15	Ligue 1	34	0	1	0	1	0	—		36	0
Metz	2015–16	Ligue 2	23	2	1	0	1	0	—		25	2
Metz	Total		161	2	6	0	7	0	0	0	174	2
KV Kortrijk	2016–17	Belgian First Division A	18	0	3	0	—		—		21	0
Reims	2016–17	Ligue 2	17	0	2	0	1	0	—		20	0
Reims	2017–18	Ligue 2	37	0	0	0	1	0	—		38	0
Reims	2018–19	Ligue 1	5	0	—		—		—		5	0
Reims	Total		59	0	2	0	2	0	0	0	63	0
Minnesota United	2019	MLS	27	1	2	0	—		1 (Note: Appearance(s) in MLS Cup Playoffs)	0	30	1
Minnesota United	2020	MLS	20	0	—		—		2	0	22	0
Minnesota United	Total		47	1	2	0	0	0	3	0	52	1
Career total			285	3	13	0	9	0	3	0	310	3

=== International ===
As of matches played on 17 November 2020

Appearances and goals by national team and year
National team	Year	Apps	Goals
Madagascar	2018	3	0
Madagascar	2019	9	0
Madagascar	2020	2	0
Total		14	0

== Honours ==
Metz

- Ligue 2: 2013–14, 2017–18

Minnesota United

- U.S. Open Cup runner-up: 2019

Individual

- UNFP Ligue 2 Team of the Year: 2013–14
- MLS All-Star: 2019
- Knight Order of Madagascar: 2019
