= Anthony Mfa Mezui =

Gabonese footballer (born 1991)

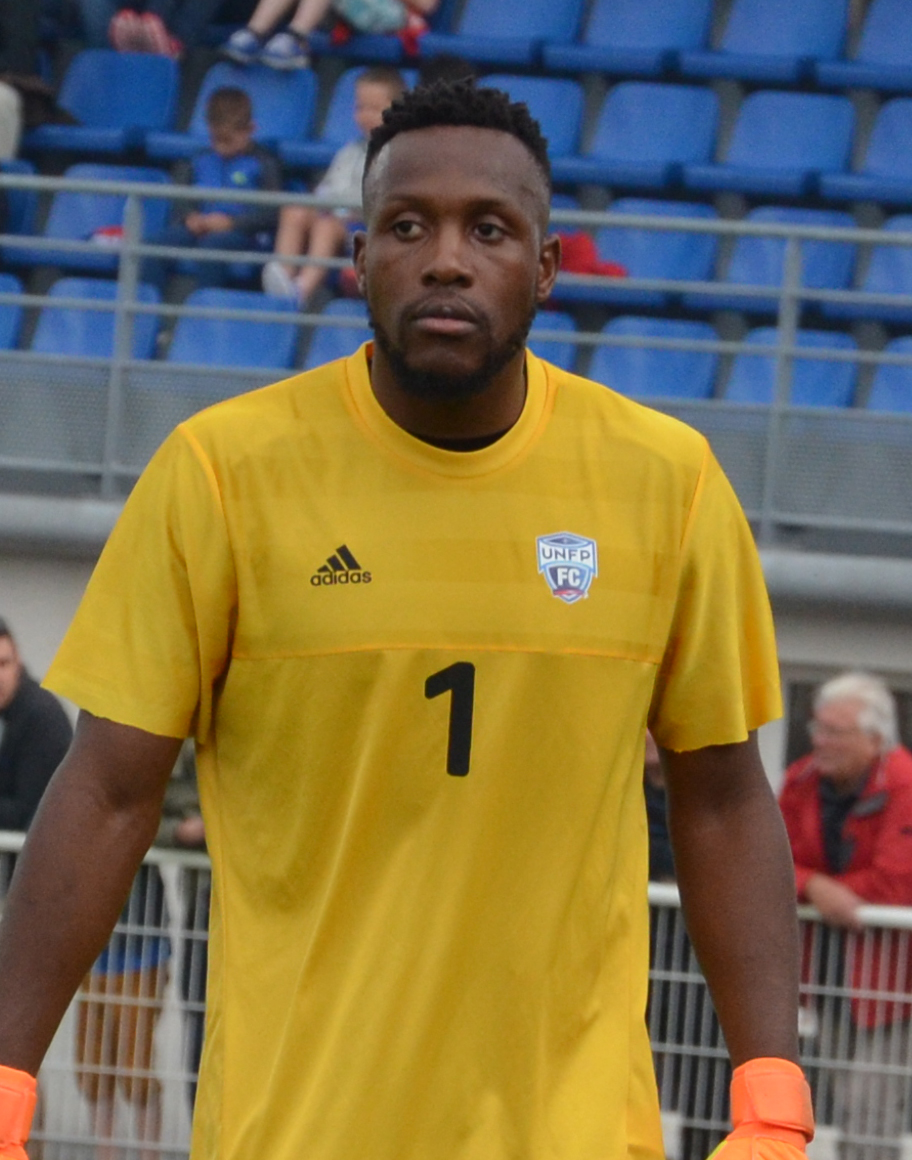
- Mfa Mezui in 2016

Personal information
- Full name: Anthony Léandre Mfa Mezui
- Date of birth: 7 March 1991 (age 35)
- Place of birth: Beauvais, France
- Height: 1.82 m (6 ft 0 in)
- Position: Goalkeeper

Team information
- Current team: Rodange 91
- Number: 31

Senior career*
Years	Team	Apps	(Gls)
2008–2010	Metz B	22	(0)
2011–2016	Metz	43	(0)
2015–2016	→ Seraing United (loan)	19	(0)
2019–2020	Sarre-Union	7	(0)
2020–	Rodange 91	118	(1)

International career^{‡}
2010–	Gabon	19	(0)
- * Club domestic league appearances and goals as of 26 June 2025 ‡ National team caps and goals as of 15:49, 4 December 2022 (UTC)

Anthony Léandre Mfa Mezui (born 7 March 1991) is a professional footballer who plays as a goalkeeper for Rodange 91. Born in France, he represents Gabon at international level.

== Career ==
Born in Beauvais, Mfa Mezui has played club football for Metz B, Metz and Seraing United.

He made his international debut for Gabon in 2010, and was a squad member at the 2012 Summer Olympics. In December 2014, he was named to Gabon's provisional squad for the 2015 African Cup of Nations.
