= Johann Carrasso =

French footballer (born 1988)

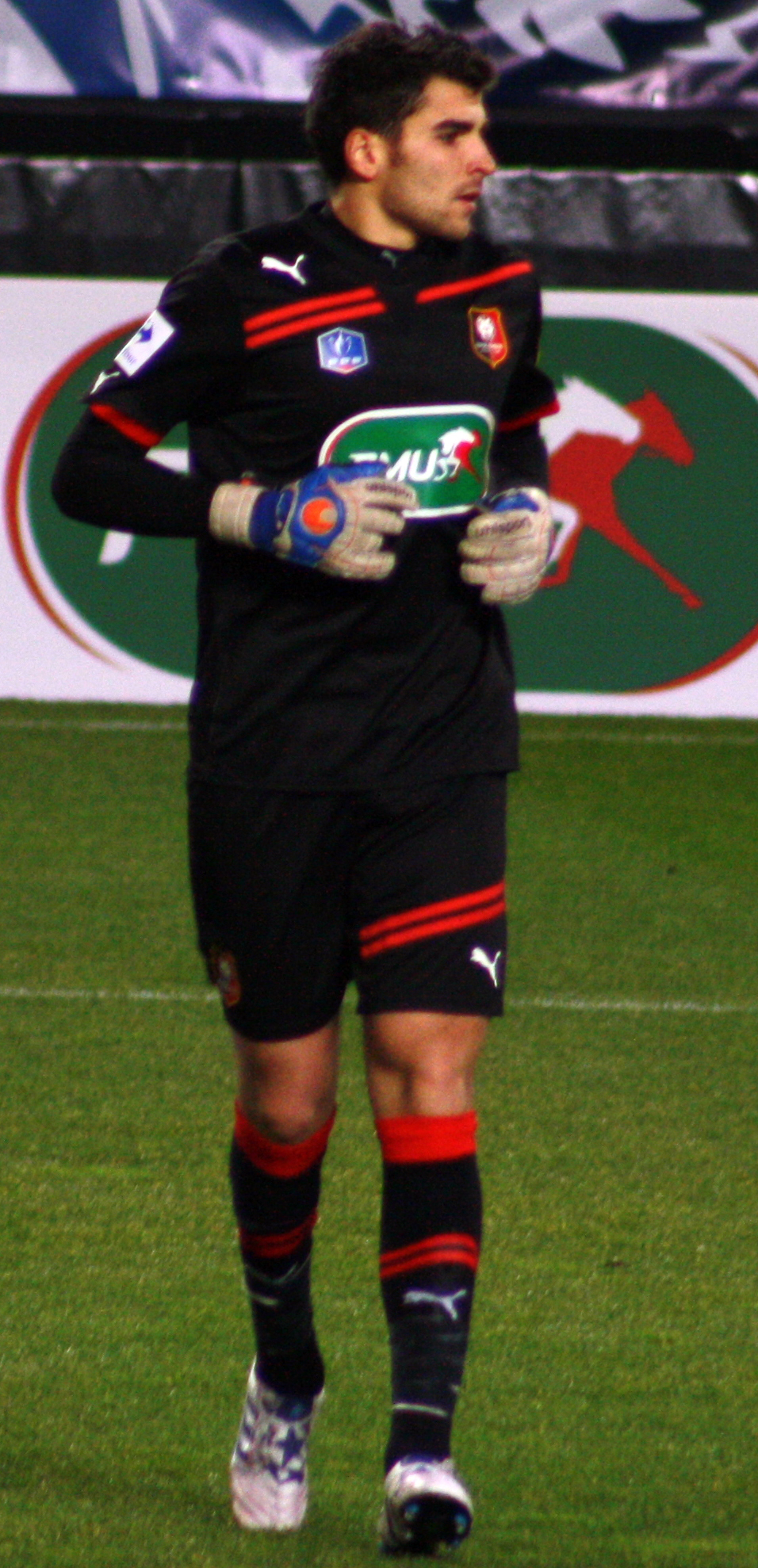
- Carrasso with Rennes in 2010

Personal information
- Full name: Johann Carrasso
- Date of birth: 7 May 1988 (age 38)
- Place of birth: Avignon, France
- Height: 1.87 m (6 ft 2 in)
- Position: Goalkeeper

Youth career
- 1997–2001: Avignon Foot
- 2000–2004: CF de Cavaillon
- 2001–2004: Le Pontet
- 2004–2007: Montpellier

Senior career*
Years	Team	Apps	(Gls)
2007–2010	Montpellier	41	(0)
2010–2013	Rennes	1	(0)
2011–2012	→ Monaco (loan)	11	(0)
2012–2013	→ Metz (loan)	23	(0)
2013–2016	Metz	54	(0)
2016–2019	Reims	42	(0)
Total		172	(0)

International career
2009–2010	France U21	5	(0)
- * Club domestic league appearances and goals

Johann Carrasso (born 7 May 1988) is a French former footballer who plays as a goalkeeper. He is the younger brother of former France national football team goalkeeper and Bordeaux legend Cédric Carrasso.

== Club career ==
=== Early career ===
Born in Avignon, Carrasso began his career at his hometown club Avignon Foot 84. During his last year at the club, he was selected to attend the Centre de Formation de Cavaillon, an exclusive sporting club for goalkeepers. During his time in Cavaillon, he trained and played with nearby club US Le Pontet.

=== Montpellier HSC ===
In 2004, Carrasso joined Montpellier's under-16 team. Following his graduation from the academy, he was promoted to the first team for the Ligue 2 2007–08 season and designated as the 2nd keeper behind Geoffrey Jourdren. He made his debut in a Coupe de la Ligue match against Dijon. He made his league debut that season, as well, on 26 October in a 2–3 loss to Clermont Foot starting in place of the injured Jourdren. Following an extensive injury to Jourdren, he made three consecutive starts recording two shutouts against Niort and Guingamp and losing to Ajaccio 1–2. He made two more proficient starts that season.

Just before the start of the 2008–09 season, Carrasso was given the role of first-choice keeper ahead of Jourdren. Over the course of the season, he recorded 12 clean sheets and, along with Montpellier's defense, allowed the third-fewest goals in the league. For his efforts, he was nominated for the Ligue 2 Goalkeeper of the Year award.

=== Rennes ===
On 29 June 2010, Rennes confirmed that the club had signed Carrasso from Montpellier on a four-year contract. As a young and substitute goalkeeper, he struggled to hold down a first-team place. On 19 July 2011, he joined AS Monaco on loan for one season.

=== Stade de Reims ===
Carrasso helped Stade de Reims win the 2017–18 Ligue 2, helping promote them to the Ligue 1 for the 2018–19 season.

At the expiration of his contract, Carrasso left the club at the end of the 2018-19 season, having made 44 appearances since his arrival in 2016, having largely been used as a substitute goalkeeper behind first choice Edouard Mendy.

== International career ==
Johann earned his first France youth cap with the under-18 team making his debut in the 2006 edition of the Sendai Cup. On 12 November 2009, he earned his first call-up to the France under-21 team. On 18 November 2009, he made his debut for the under-21 team against Denmark.

== Career statistics ==
Appearances and goals by club, season and competition
Club	Season	League			National cup (Note: Includes Coupe de France, FA Cup)		League cup (Note: Includes Coupe de la Ligue)		Total	
Club	Season	Division	Apps	Goals	Apps	Goals	Apps	Goals	Apps	Goals
Montpellier	2006–07	Ligue 2	0	0	0	0	0	0	0	0
Montpellier	2007–08	Ligue 2	6	0	0	0	2	0	8	0
Montpellier	2008–09	Ligue 2	35	0	0	0	0	0	35	0
Montpellier	2009–10	Ligue 1	0	0	0	0	0	0	0	0
Montpellier	Total		41	0	0	0	2	0	43	0
Rennes	2010–11	Ligue 1	1	0	2	0	1	0	4	0
Monaco (loan)	2011–12	Ligue 2	11	0	1	0	0	0	12	0
Metz (loan)	2012–13	Championnat National	23	0	5	0	1	0	29	0
Metz	2013–14	Ligue 2	33	0	0	0	0	0	33	0
Metz	2014–15	Ligue 1	21	0	3	0	1	0	25	0
Metz	2015–16	Ligue 2	0	0	0	0	0	0	0	0
Metz	Metz total		77	0	8	0	2	0	87	0
Reims	2015–16	Ligue 1	10	0	—		—		10	0
Reims	2016–17	Ligue 2	29	0	1	0	0	0	30	0
Reims	2017–18	Ligue 2	3	0	2	0	2	0	7	0
Reims	2018–19	Ligue 1	0	0	0	0	0	0	0	0
Reims	Total		42	0	3	0	2	0	47	0
Career total			172	0	14	0	7	0	193	0

== Honours ==
Reims

- Ligue 2 (1): 2017–18
