= Jonathan Rivierez =

Footballer (born 1989)

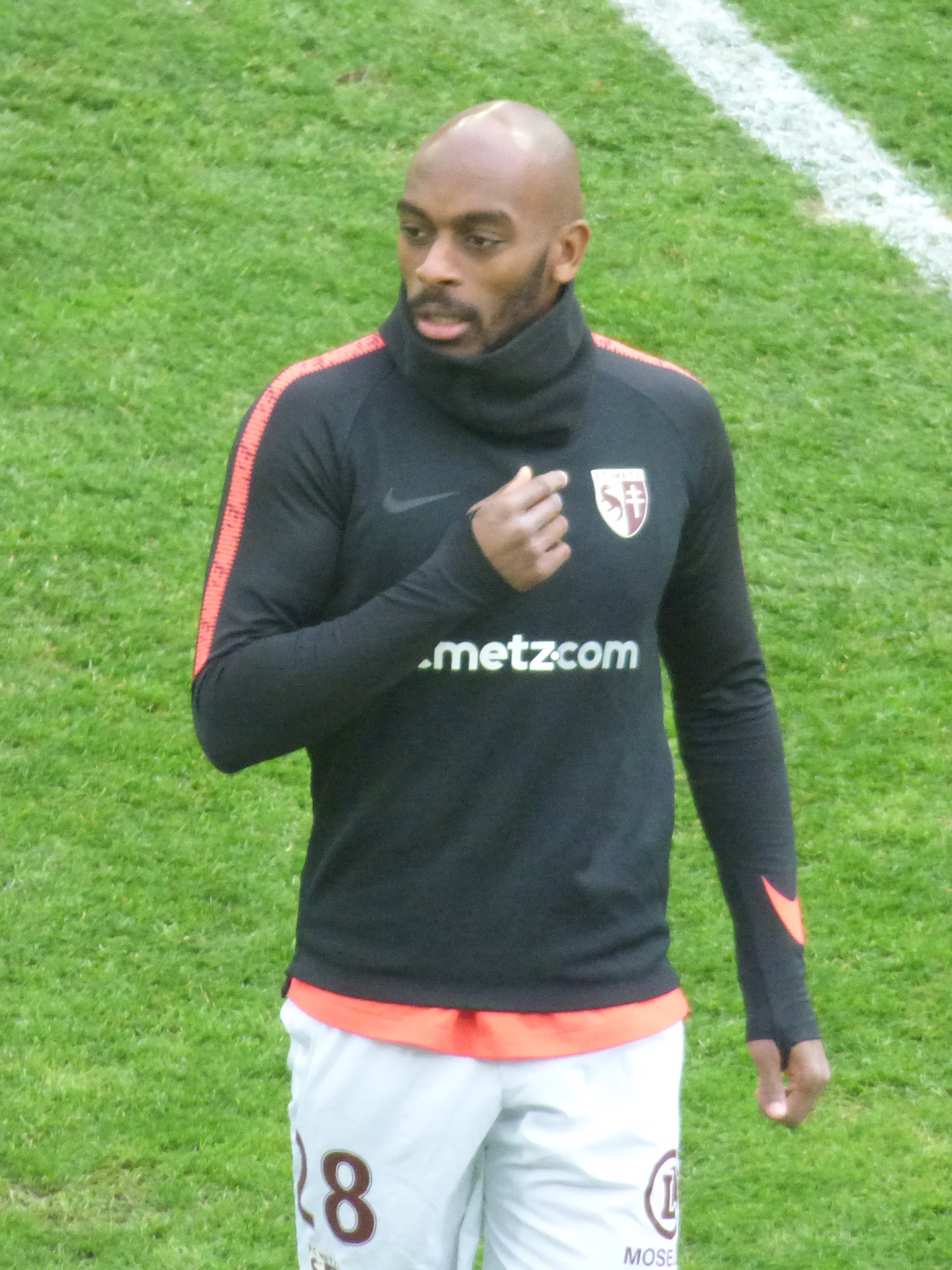
- Rivierez in 2019

Personal information
- Full name: Jonathan Sébastien Rivierez
- Date of birth: 18 May 1989 (age 37)
- Place of birth: Le Blanc-Mesnil, France
- Height: 1.82 m (6 ft 0 in)
- Position: Defender

Senior career*
Years	Team	Apps	(Gls)
2008–2009	Niort	23	(0)
2009–2010	Lille B	25	(0)
2010–2014	Le Havre	117	(1)
2014–2019	Metz	83	(1)
2014–2019	Metz B	14	(1)
2019–2022	Caen	81	(1)
2022–2024	Bourg-Péronnas	29	(1)

International career^{‡}
2022–	Martinique	1	(0)
- * Club domestic league appearances and goals as of 1 July 2024 ‡ National team caps and goals as of 00:03, 31 March 2022 (UTC)

Jonathan Sébastien Rivierez (born 18 May 1989) is a professional footballer who plays as a defender. Born in mainland France, he plays for the Martinique national team.

== Career ==
Rivierez started his career with Niort, making his debut for the club on 30 September 2008 in the 0–1 defeat to Bayonne in the Championnat National. In the summer of 2009, he joined Lille OSC and made 25 appearances for their reserve team before transferring to Le Havre the following year.

On 26 July 2022, Rivierez signed with Bourg-Péronnas.

== International career ==
Born in metropolitan France, Rivierez is of Martiniquais descent. He was called up to represent the Martinique regional team for a pair of friendlies in March 2022. He debuted with Martinique in a friendly 4–3 win over Guadeloupe on 26 March 2022.
