= Guido Milán =

Argentine footballer

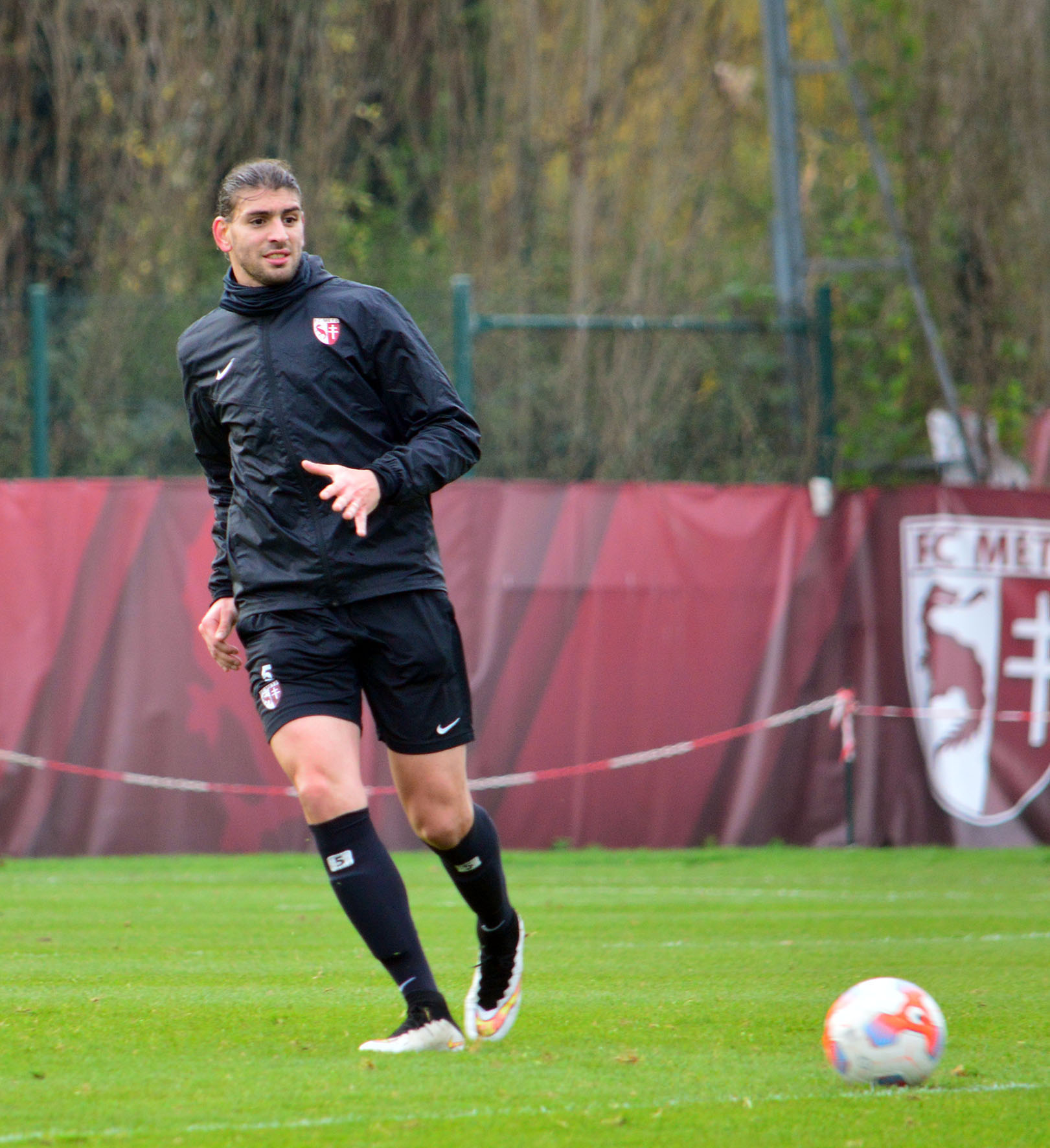

Personal information
- Full name: Guido Leonardo Milán
- Date of birth: July 3, 1987 (age 39)
- Place of birth: Haedo, Argentina
- Height: 1.94 m (6 ft 4 in)
- Position: Centre-back

Team information
- Current team: Gimnasia y Tiro

Youth career
- Deportivo Español

Senior career*
Years	Team	Apps	(Gls)
2006–2010	Deportivo Español		
2010–2011	Gimnasia Jujuy	33	(1)
2011–2012	Atlanta	28	(1)
2012–2017	Metz	103	(4)
2017–2018	Veracruz	23	(0)
2019–2021	Ferro	7	(0)
2021	Gimnasia y Tiro		
2022	Rafaela	16	(0)
2022–	Gimnasia y Tiro	18	(3)
- * Club domestic league appearances and goals as of 15:23, 4 December 2022 (UTC)

Guido Leonardo Milán (born July 3, 1987) is an Argentine professional footballer who plays as a centre-back for Gimnasia y Tiro.
