= Renaud Cohade =

French footballer (born 1984)

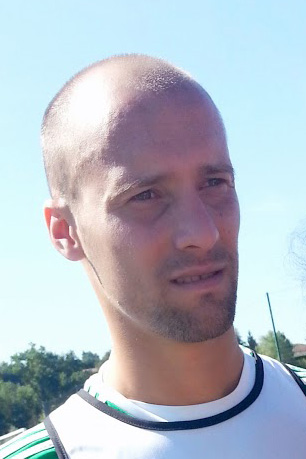
- Cohade at training with Saint-Étienne in 2013

Personal information
- Date of birth: 29 September 1984 (age 42)
- Place of birth: Aubenas, France
- Height: 1.80 m (5 ft 11 in)
- Position: Midfielder

Senior career*
Years	Team	Apps	(Gls)
2001–2004	Nîmes	76	(4)
2004–2005	Bordeaux	23	(0)
2005–2006	→ Sète (loan)	13	(0)
2006–2009	Strasbourg	90	(17)
2009–2012	Valenciennes	98	(8)
2012–2016	Saint-Étienne	107	(6)
2016–2020	Metz	121	(3)
Total		528	(38)
- * Club domestic league appearances and goals

Renaud Cohade (born 29 September 1984) is a French former professional footballer who played as a midfielder.

== Career ==
In July 2016, Cohade signed a three-year contract with FC Metz after playing four seasons for AS Saint-Étienne.

In May 2020, with his Metz contract running out in June, Cohade was linked with a move to Toulouse FC. By January 2021, he was still without a club with Cohade stating he would likely retire.

By March 2022 Cohade had retired from playing.

== Honours ==
Saint-Étienne

- French League Cup: 2012–13
