= Chris Philipps =

Luxembourgish footballer (born 1994)

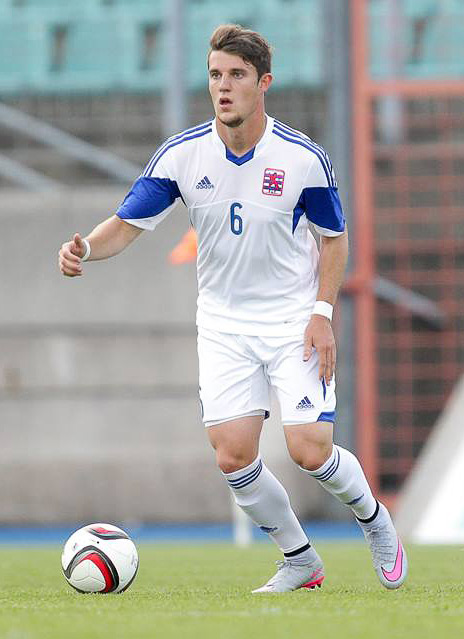

Personal information
- Date of birth: 8 March 1994 (age 32)
- Place of birth: Wiltz, Luxembourg
- Positions: Centre-back; defensive midfielder

Team information
- Current team: Wiltz 71
- Number: 8

Youth career
- Metz

Senior career*
Years	Team	Apps	(Gls)
2012–2017	Metz B	43	(1)
2013–2018	Metz	37	(0)
2015–2016	→ Preußen Münster (loan)	25	(0)
2018–2020	Legia Warsaw	17	(0)
2018–2019	Legia Warsaw II	17	(0)
2020	Lommel	2	(0)
2021–	Wiltz 71	139	(17)

International career^{‡}
2012–	Luxembourg	57	(0)
- * Club domestic league appearances and goals as of 6 June 2026 ‡ National team caps and goals as of 9 June 2024

Chris Philipps (born 8 March 1994) is a Luxembourgish professional footballer who plays for Wiltz 71 as a midfielder.

== Club career ==
Born in Wiltz, Philipps has played club football in France and Germany for Metz B, Metz and SC Preußen Münster. He moved to Polish club Legia Warsaw on 2 February 2018. In the beginning of January 2020, he moved to Belgian Belgian First Division B club Lommel SK. He later returned to Luxembourg with Wiltz 71.

== International career ==
During 2011 and 2012, Philipps competed in qualifying matches for the 2012 UEFA European Under-19 Football Championship and 2013 UEFA European Under-21 Football Championship. He made his senior international debut for Luxembourg in 2012.

== Honours ==
Legia Warsaw

- Ekstraklasa: 2017–18
- Polish Cup: 2017–18
