= David Oberhauser =

French footballer (born 1990)

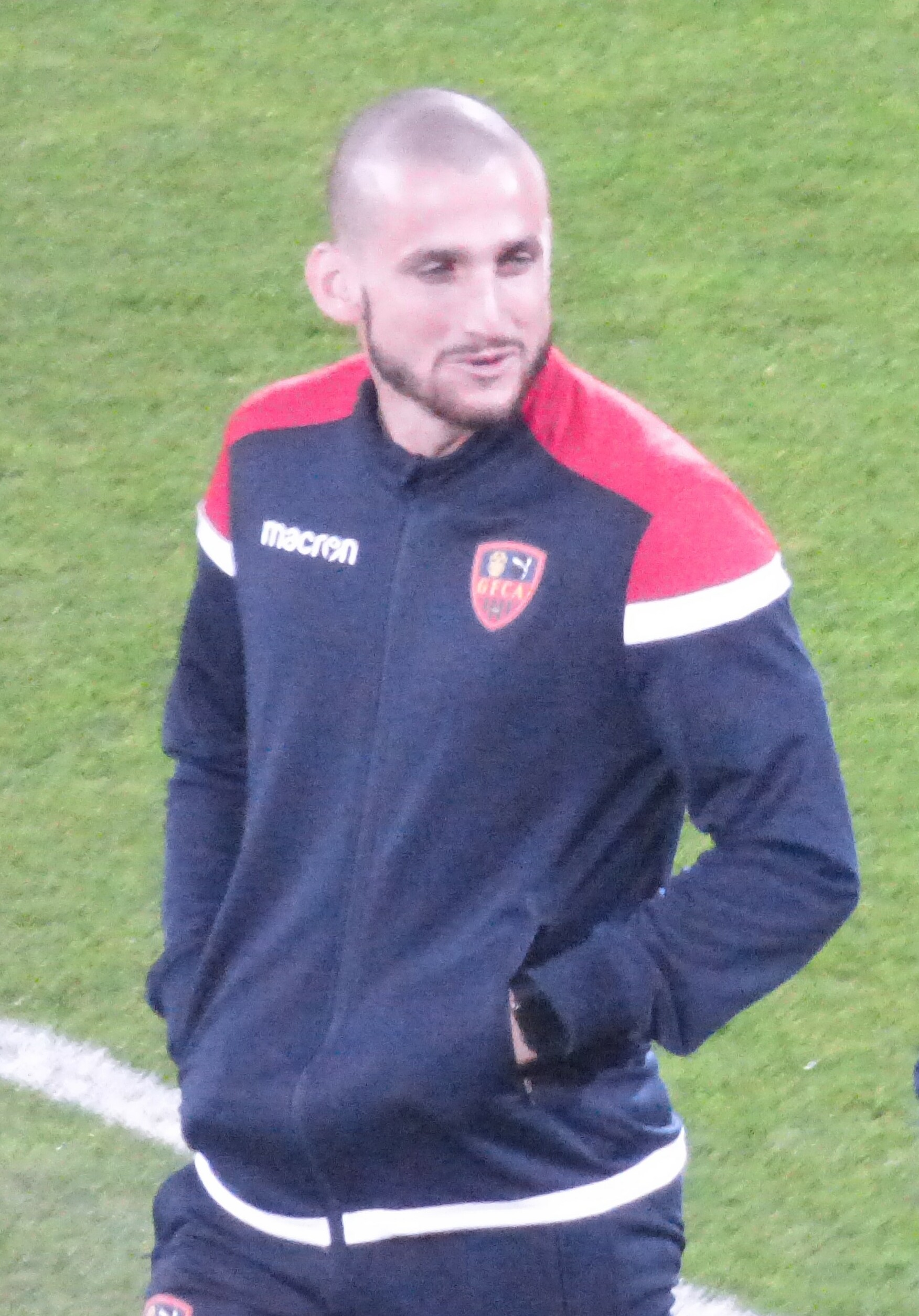
- Oberhauser in 2018

Personal information
- Date of birth: 29 November 1990 (age 35)
- Place of birth: Bitche, France
- Height: 1.86 m (6 ft 1 in)
- Position: Goalkeeper

Senior career*
Years	Team	Apps	(Gls)
2011–2013	Ajaccio	1	(0)
2012	Ajaccio B	5	(0)
2013–2014	UTA Arad	3	(0)
2014–2017	Metz B	20	(0)
2014–2017	Metz	15	(0)
2017–2018	Platanias	2	(0)
2018–2019	Gazélec Ajaccio	31	(0)
2019–2020	Red Star	1	(0)
2020–2021	Le Puy	12	(0)
2021–2022	Metz B	6	(0)
2022–2024	Boulogne	15	(0)
- * Club domestic league appearances and goals

David Oberhauser (born 29 November 1990) is a French former professional footballer who played as a goalkeeper. He is of German descent.

== Club career ==
On 30 August 2021, he returned to Metz on a two-year contract. On 29 August 2022, Oberhauser moved to Boulogne.
