= Fadil Sido =

Burkinabé footballer

Personal information
- Date of birth: April 13, 1993 (age 33)
- Place of birth: Ouagadougou, Burkina Faso
- Height: 1.70 m (5 ft 7 in)
- Position: Attacking midfielder

Senior career*
Years	Team	Apps	(Gls)
2011–2013	Le Mans B	32	(7)
2012–2013	Le Mans	11	(2)
2014–2015	Metz B	44	(9)
2014–2016	Metz	11	(0)

International career
- Burkina Faso U17
- * Club domestic league appearances and goals as of 00:32, 22 August 2016 (UTC)

Fadil Sido (born 13 April 1993) is a Burkinabé football midfielder.

He played in the 2009 FIFA U-17 World Cup.
