= Kévin Lejeune =

French footballer (born 1985)

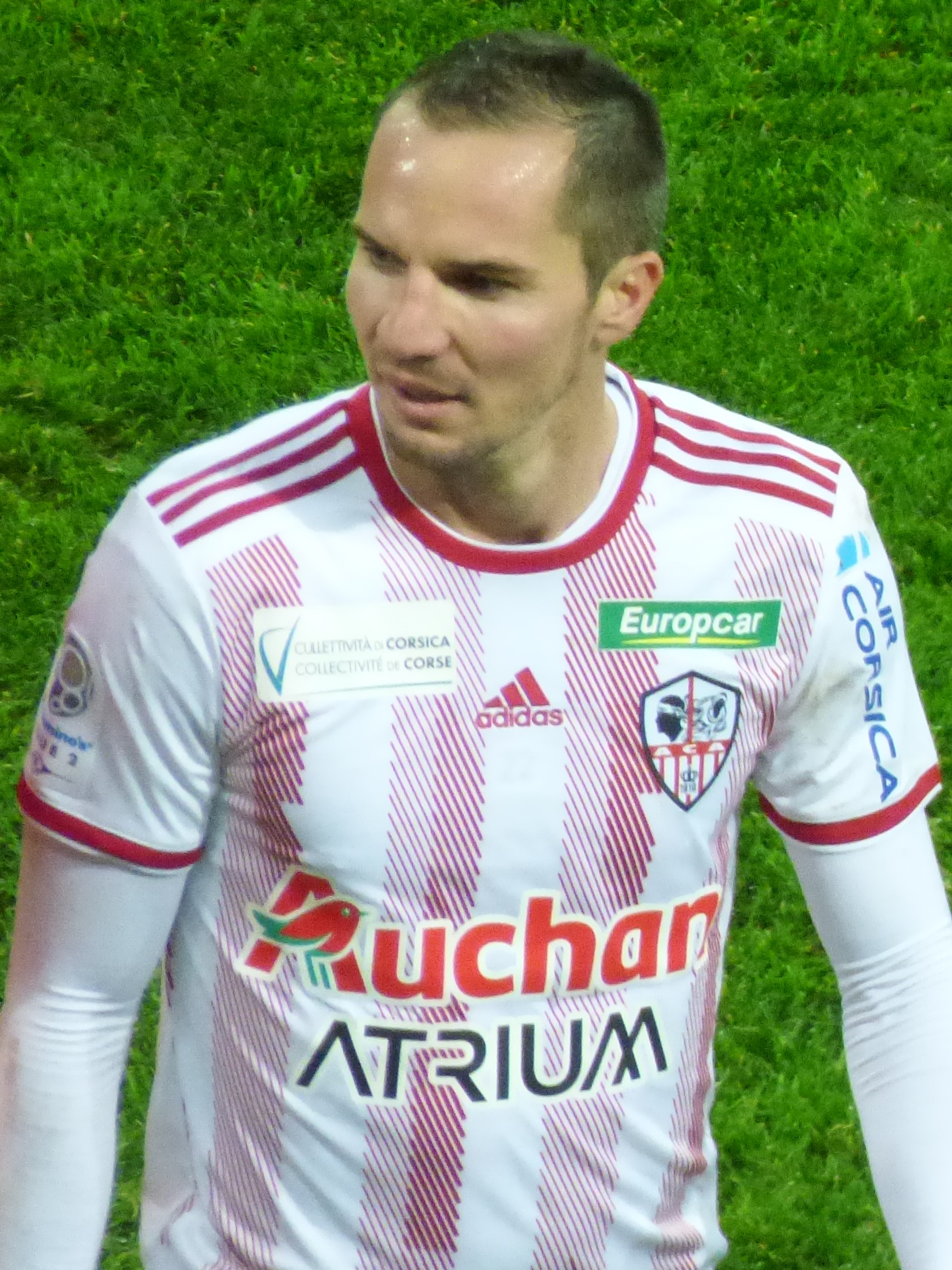
- Lejeune with Ajaccio in 2018

Personal information
- Full name: Kévin Philippe Lejeune
- Date of birth: 22 January 1985 (age 41)
- Place of birth: Cambrai, France
- Height: 1.81 m (5 ft 11 in)
- Position: Left winger

Team information
- Current team: Metz (team manager)

Youth career
- 1992–1999: Montauban FCTG
- 1999–2000: Toulouse Fontaines
- 2000–2006: Auxerre

Senior career*
Years	Team	Apps	(Gls)
2006–2010	Auxerre	84	(7)
2010	→ Nantes (loan)	17	(0)
2010–2012	Tours	67	(5)
2012–2017	Metz	138	(11)
2017–2020	Ajaccio	64	(1)
Total		370	(24)

International career
2002	France U17	6	(0)
2003–2004	France U19	5	(2)
2005	France U21	3	(0)

Managerial career
- 2020–: Metz (team manager)
Medal record
Men's football
Representing France
UEFA European Under-17 Championship
Runner-up	2002 Denmark
- * Club domestic league appearances and goals

Kévin Philippe Lejeune (born 22 January 1985) is a French former professional footballer who played as a left winger and current Team Manager of FC Metz.

Formed at Auxerre where he made his debut in Ligue 1 in 2006, Lejeune was loaned to Nantes before leaving for Ligue 2 club Tours in 2010. Two years later he signed for FC Metz, and won two consecutive promotions from the Championnat National to Ligue 1, extending his contract three times. When it expired in 2017, he joined Ajaccio. After three seasons with the club, he retired from playing.

== Career ==
=== Auxerre ===
Born in Cambrai, Nord, Lejeune began his career in 1998 with Toulouse Fontaines Club before moving to Auxerre in July 2000. He made his debut on 19 November 2006 during a 1–0 Ligue 1 win over Toulouse at home, coming on in added time in place of Luigi Pieroni. He made three more appearances off the bench, and on 26 May 2007 in the last game of the season, he replaced Ireneusz Jeleń in the 35th minute and scored at the end of a 3–1 win at Valenciennes. On 22 September 2007, he was sent off in a 2–0 victory against Marseille at the Stade de l'Abbé-Deschamps.

Over the following two seasons, Lejeune played regularly, but in 2009–10 manager Jean Fernandez preferred players such as Kamel Chafni in his position and he started just once in the first half of the campaign. On 6 January 2010, he joined Ligue 2 club Nantes on loan for the remainder of the season.

=== Tours ===
In July 2010, Lejeune joined Cardiff City on trial, playing 45 minutes of a pre-season 3–0 defeat to Portimonense. Later that month, he moved on a free transfer to Tours of Ligue 2, on a two-year contract.

=== Metz ===
At the conclusion of Lejeune's Tours contract, he signed one of the same duration at Metz in the Championnat National. He played 33 matches as they won promotion as runners-up to Créteil, and scored once in a 2–0 win at Red Star on 12 April 2013. In his second season at the Stade Saint-Symphorien, the Grenats won a second consecutive promotion, this time as champions of Ligue 2. He scored four times, including two at Brest in a 3–0 win on 21 October 2013. In January 2014, he extended his contract by another two years, and signed further one-year extensions in August 2015 and September 2016.

=== Ajaccio ===
Lejeune left Metz on 31 August 2017, for Ajaccio also in Ligue 2. In his first season, he played 25 games as the Corsicans came third, and scored once on 6 April 2018 to conclude a 2–0 win at Châteauroux. Three weeks later, he was sent off in a loss by the same score at Le Havre.

== After retirement ==
After retiring at the end of the 2019-20 season, Lejeune returned to his former club, FC Metz, as a team manager. As of September 2022, Lejeune was still in the same position.
