= List of French football transfers summer 2017 =

This is a list of French football transfers for the 2017 summer transfer window. Only moves featuring Ligue 1 or Ligue 2 are listed.

== Ligue 1 ==
Note: Flags indicate national team as has been defined under FIFA eligibility rules. Players may hold more than one non-FIFA nationality.

=== Amiens SC ===
In:

No.	Pos.	Nation	Player
2	DF	FRA	Prince-Désir Gouano (from (Italy) Atalanta, previously on loan at (Portugal) Vitória de Guimarães)
9	FW	FRA	Brighton Labeau (from AS Monaco)
11	FW	FRA	Jean-Luc Dompé (on loan from (Belgium) Standard Liège, previously on loan at (Belgium) KAS Eupen)
14	MF	COD	Gaël Kakuta (on loan from Hebei China Fortune, previously on loan at (Spain) Deportivo La Coruña)
15	FW	SEN	Moussa Konaté (from (Switzerland) FC Sion)
17	MF	FRA	Madih Talal (from Angers SCO)
20	MF	FRA	Sékou Baradji
24	DF	FRA	Mathieu Bodmer (from EA Guingamp)
25	DF	SEN	Issa Cissokho (from (Italy) Genoa, previously on loan at Angers SCO)
28	FW	CIV	Lacina Traoré (on loan from AS Monaco, previously on loan at (Spain) Sporting de Gijón)
34	MF	RSA	Bongani Zungu (from (Portugal) Vitória de Guimarães)
35	DF	BRA	Danilo Avelar (on loan from (Italy) Torino)
37	MF	TOG	Serge Gakpé (from (Italy) Genoa, previously on loan at (Italy) Chievo Verona)
--	MF	BRA	Nathan (on loan from (England) Chelsea, previously on loan at (Netherlands) Vitesse Arnhem)

Out:

No.	Pos.	Nation	Player
7	MF	FRA	Joachim Eickmayer (to Les Herbiers VF)
9	FW	FRA	Yannick Mamilonne (on loan to US Quevilly-Rouen)
10	FW	ALG	Réda Rabeï (on loan to AS Lyon-Duchère)
11	FW	CIV	Junior Tallo (loan return to Lille OSC)
20	MF	GUI	Richard Soumah (to (Israel) Maccabi Petah Tikva)
22	MF	FRA	Tanguy Ndombele (to Olympique Lyonnais)
23	DF	FRA	Jean Calvé (released)
25	DF	FRA	Jordan Lefort (on loan to US Quevilly-Rouen)
27	FW	FRA	Aboubakar Kamara (to (England) Fulham)
29	DF	FRA	Matthieu Fontaine (to Red Star FC)
—	DF	FRA	Alioune Ba (to Stade Lavallois, previously on loan at US Quevilly-Rouen)

=== Angers SCO ===
In:

No.	Pos.	Nation	Player
9	FW	FRA	Enzo Crivelli (from Girondins de Bordeaux, previously on loan at SC Bastia)
11	FW	CIV	Wilfried Kanga (from Paris Saint-Germain, previously on loan at US Créteil)
12	MF	MLI	Lassana Coulibaly (from SC Bastia)
17	DF	SEN	Saliou Ciss (from Valenciennes FC)
19	FW	BEL	Baptiste Guillaume (from Lille OSC, previously on loan at RC Lens)
21	MF	FRA	Loïc Puyo (from AS Nancy)
23	DF	FRA	Angelo Fulgini (from Valenciennes FC)
27	MF	CIV	Thomas Touré (from Girondins de Bordeaux)
31	MF	ALG	Youcef Belaili (from (Algeria) USM Alger)

Out:

No.	Pos.	Nation	Player
1	GK	SLO	Denis Petrić (to EA Guingamp)
2	FW	FRA	Kévin Bérigaud (loan return to Montpellier HSC)
6	DF	FRA	Grégory Bourillon (to La Berrichonne de Châteauroux)
9	FW	SEN	Famara Diedhiou (to (England) Bristol City)
11	FW	NGR	Dickson Nwakaeme (released)
12	FW	FRA	Yoane Wissa (on loan to AC Ajaccio, previously on loan at Stade Lavallois)
17	MF	SEN	Cheikh N'Doye (to (England) Birmingham City)
19	FW	CIV	Nicolas Pépé (to Lille OSC)
21	DF	FRA	Pablo Martinez (to RC Strasbourg)
22	MF	FRA	Jonathan Bamba (loan return to AS Saint-Étienne)
23	MF	TUN	Jamel Saihi (released)
27	FW	CGO	Fodé Doré (on loan to Clermont Foot)
28	DF	SEN	Issa Cissokho (loan return to (Italy) Genoa)
—	DF	MLI	Kalifa Traoré (released, previously on loan at Les Herbiers VF)
—	DF	FRA	Gabriel Mutombo (on loan to US Orléans, previously on loan at CA Bastia)
—	MF	FRA	Mathias Serin (on loan to USL Dunkerque)
—	MF	FRA	Madih Talal (to Angers SCO)
—	FW	SUI	Goran Karanović (released, previously on loan at FC Sochaux-Montbéliard)

=== FC Girondins de Bordeaux ===
In:

No.	Pos.	Nation	Player
1	GK	FRA	Benoît Costil (from Stade Rennes)
4	DF	SRB	Vukašin Jovanović (from (Russia) Zenit St Petersburg, previously on loan)
5	MF	BRA	Otávio (from (Brazil) Atlético Paranaense)
12	FW	FRA	Nicolas de Préville (from Lille OSC)
15	FW	FRA	Alexandre Mendy (from EA Guingamp)
17	MF	BRA	Matheus Pereira (on loan from (Italy) Juventus, previously on loan at (Italy) Empoli)
19	MF	DEN	Lukas Lerager (from (Belgium) Zulte Waregem)
20	DF	FRA	Youssouf Sabaly (from Paris Saint-Germain, previously on loan)
22	FW	BRA	Jonathan Cafu (from (Bulgaria) Ludogorets Razgrad)

Out:

No.	Pos.	Nation	Player
1	GK	FRA	Cédric Carrasso (to (Turkey) Galatasaray)
4	DF	BRA	Pablo Castro (to (Brazil) Corinthians, previously on loan)
5	DF	FRA	Nicolas Pallois (to FC Nantes)
7	FW	FRA	Jérémy Ménez (to (Turkey) Antalyaspor)
8	MF	URU	Mauro Arambarri (to (Uruguay) Boston River)
9	FW	URU	Diego Rolán (on loan to (Spain) Málaga)
10	MF	CIV	Thomas Touré (to Angers SCO)
12	MF	FRA	Younes Kaabouni (released)
15	MF	MLI	Abdou Traoré (released)
17	MF	ALG	Adam Ounas (to (Italy) Napoli)
19	MF	FRA	Nicolas Maurice-Belay (released)
26	DF	FRA	Frédéric Guilbert (to SM Caen, previously on loan)
28	MF	ARG	Daniel Mancini (on loan to Tours FC)
30	GK	FRA	Paul Bernardoni (on loan to Clermont Foot)
—	DF	CAF	Cédric Yambéré (to Dijon FCO, previously on loan at (Cyprus) APOEL)
—	MF	CMR	Kevin Soni (to (Spain) Girona, previously on loan at FC Pau)
—	MF	FRA	Jorris Romil (to Valenciennes FC)
—	FW	FRA	Enzo Crivelli (to Angers SCO, previously on loan at SC Bastia)
—	FW	SWE	Isaac Kiese Thelin (to (Belgium) RSC Anderlecht, previously on loan)

=== Stade Malherbe Caen ===
In:

No.	Pos.	Nation	Player
5	DF	GUI	Baissama Sankoh (from EA Guingamp)
8	MF	BEL	Stef Peeters (from (Belgium) Sint-Truidense VV)
9	MF	SLO	Jan Repas (from (Slovenia) NK Domžale)
10	MF	MAR	Youssef Ait Bennasser (on loan from AS Monaco, previously on loan at AS Nancy)
13	FW	CIV	Christian Kouakou (loan return from Nîmes Olympique)
17	MF	COD	Jordan Nkololo (loan return from Stade Lavallois)
21	DF	FRA	Frédéric Guilbert (from Girondins de Bordeaux, previously on loan)
22	DF	SEN	Adama Mbengue (from (Senegal) Diambars FC)
24	DF	FRA	Alexander Djiku (from SC Bastia)
30	GK	CGO	Brice Samba (from Olympique de Marseille)

Out:

No.	Pos.	Nation	Player
2	DF	FRA	Nicolas Seube (retired)
5	DF	TUN	Alaeddine Yahia (to AS Nancy)
7	MF	FRA	Yann Karamoh (on loan to (Italy) Internazionale)
8	MF	BEN	Jordan Adeoti (to AJ Auxerre)
10	MF	FRA	Steed Malbranque (retired)
13	DF	TUN	Syam Ben Youssef (to (Turkey) Kasımpaşa)
15	MF	BEN	Emmanuel Imorou (on loan to (Belgium) Cercle Brugge)
17	MF	FRA	Jean-Victor Makengo (to OGC Nice)
21	DF	COM	Chaker Alhadhur (on loan to La Berrichonne de Châteauroux)
22	FW	SEN	Pape Sané (on loan to AJ Auxerre)
24	DF	FRA	Frédéric Guilbert (loan return to Girondins de Bordeaux)
30	GK	FRA	Paul Reulet (on loan to US Boulogne)
—	MF	CIV	Christopher Operi (to La Berrichonne de Châteauroux)
—	FW	CGO	Exauce Ngassaki (to Stade Brestois)

=== Dijon FCO ===
In:

No.	Pos.	Nation	Player
4	DF	SEN	Papy Djilobodji (on loan from (England) Sunderland)
6	DF	NCL	Wesley Lautoa (from FC Lorient)
9	FW	FRA	Wesley Said (from Stade Rennais)
10	MF	TUN	Naïm Sliti (on loan from Lille OSC)
18	DF	CAF	Cédric Yambéré (from Girondins de Bordeaux, previously on loan at (Cyprus) APOEL)
21	MF	FRA	Eden Massouema (from Paris FC)
28	MF	POR	Xeka (on loan from Lille OSC)
29	FW	FRA	Benjamin Jeannot (from FC Lorient)

Out:

No.	Pos.	Nation	Player
3	MF	FRA	Anthony Belmonte (to (Bulgaria) Levski Sofia)
4	DF	FRA	Jordan Lotiès (to (Belgium) KAS Eupen)
7	FW	FRA	Yohann Rivière (to US Créteil)
8	MF	FRA	Pierre Lees-Melou (to OGC Nice)
9	FW	FRA	Loïs Diony (to AS Saint-Étienne)
10	MF	FRA	Jérémie Bela (to (Spain) Albacete)
13	MF	FRA	Marvin Martin (loan return to Lille OSC)
21	DF	MAR	Yunis Abdelhamid (to Stade de Reims)
—	GK	FRA	Enzo Basilio (on loan to Rodez AF, previously on loan at US Quevilly-Rouen)
—	MF	FRA	Jessy Benet (on loan to Grenoble Foot 38, previously on loan at US Avranches)
—	FW	FRA	Charly Dutournier (on loan to US Avranches, previously on loan at US Concarneau)
—	FW	SEN	Mamadou Thiam (to (England) Barnsley FC, previously on loan at Clermont Foot)

=== En Avant de Guingamp ===
In:

No.	Pos.	Nation	Player
3	DF	POR	Pedro Rebocho (from (Portugal) S.L. Benfica, previously on loan at (Portugal) Moreirense)
9	MF	GUI	Abdoul Camara (from (England) Derby County)
16	GK	FRA	Marc-Aurèle Caillard (from Clermont Foot)
18	MF	RSA	Lebogang Phiri (from (Denmark) Brøndby IF)
20	DF	CMR	Felix Eboa Eboa (from Paris Saint-Germain)
21	FW	FRA	Marcus Thuram (from FC Sochaux-Montbéliard)
27	DF	FRA	Franck Tabanou (from (Wales) Swansea City, previously on loan at (Spain) Granada CF)
30	DF	SLO	Denis Petrić (from EA Guingamp)
—	DF	FRA	Cheick Traoré (from La Berrichonne de Châteauroux)

Out:

No.	Pos.	Nation	Player
3	DF	BRA	Marçal (loan return to (Portugal) S.L. Benfica)
4	DF	GUI	Baissama Sankoh (to SM Caen)
7	DF	FRA	Dorian Lévêque (to (Greece) PAOK FC)
9	FW	FRA	Alexandre Mendy (to Girondins de Bordeaux)
12	MF	BEL	Nill De Pauw (to (Belgium) Zulte Waregem)
16	GK	FRA	Théo Guivarch (on loan to US Concarneau)
25	DF	FRA	Reynald Lemaitre (released)
27	DF	FRA	Mathieu Bodmer (to Amiens SC)
30	GK	FRA	Romain Salin (to (Portugal) Sporting CP)
40	GK	HAI	Johnny Placide (to (England) Oldham Athletic)
--	DF	FRA	Cheick Traoré (on loan to La Berrichonne de Châteauroux)
--	MF	FRA	Jérémy Livolant (on loan to US Boulogne)

=== Lille OSC ===
In:

No.	Pos.	Nation	Player
1	GK	SVK	Adam Jakubech (from (Slovakia) Spartak Trnava)
2	DF	FRA	Kevin Malcuit (from AS Saint-Étienne)
8	MF	POR	Xeka (from (Portugal) S.C. Braga, previously on loan)
9	FW	ARG	Ezequiel Ponce (on loan from (Italy) AS Roma, previously on loan at (Spain) Granada CF)
11	FW	BRA	Luiz Araújo (from (Brazil) São Paulo FC)
12	FW	FRA	Nicolas de Préville (from (Belgium) KV Oostende, previously on loan)
14	DF	CIV	Kouadio-Yves Dabila (from AS Monaco)
15	DF	POR	Edgar Ié (from (Portugal) Belenenses)
19	FW	CIV	Nicolas Pépé (from Angers SCO)
20	MF	BRA	Thiago Maia (from (Brazil) Santos)
23	MF	BRA	Thiago Mendes (from (Brazil) São Paulo)
25	DF	FRA	Fodé Ballo-Touré (from Paris Saint-Germain)
30	GK	BFA	Kouakou Hervé Koffi (from (Ivory Coast) ASEC Mimosas)
--	DF	BRA	Caju (on loan from (Brazil) Santos)

Out:

No.	Pos.	Nation	Player
3	DF	MLI	Youssouf Koné (on loan to Stade de Reims)
4	DF	BRA	Gabriel Magalhães (on loan to ES Troyes AC)
8	MF	POR	Xeka (on loan to Dijon FCO)
10	FW	NED	Ricardo Kishna (loan return to (Italy) Lazio)
11	MF	FRA	Eric Bauthéac (to (Australia) Brisbane Roar)
12	FW	FRA	Nicolas de Préville (to Girondins de Bordeaux)
13	DF	ZAM	Stoppila Sunzu (on loan to (Russia) Arsenal Tula, previously on loan)
15	DF	FRA	Julian Palmieri (released)
17	MF	POR	Rony Lopes (loan return to AS Monaco)
18	DF	FRA	Franck Beria (retired)
19	FW	POR	Éder (on loan to (Russia) Lokomotiv Moscow)
24	MF	FRA	Rio Mavuba (to (Czech Republic) Sparta Prague)
25	DF	MNE	Marko Baša (released)
27	MF	TUN	Naïm Sliti (on loan to Dijon FCO)
28	FW	FRA	Martin Terrier (on loan to RC Strasbourg)
30	GK	FRA	Jean Butez (to (Belgium) Royal Excel Mouscron)
34	DF	HAI	Carlens Arcus (to (Belgium) Cercle Brugge)
—	MF	POR	Alexis Araujo (on loan to Gazélec Ajaccio, previously on loan at USL Dunkerque)
—	MF	FRA	Marvin Martin (to Stade de Reims, previously on loan at Dijon FCO)
—	FW	BEL	Baptiste Guillaume (to Angers SCO, previously on loan at RC Lens)
—	FW	RSA	Lebo Mothiba (on loan to Valenciennes FC, previously on loan)
—	FW	FRA	Lenny Nangis (to Valenciennes FC, previously on loan at SC Bastia)
—	FW	CIV	Junior Tallo (released, previously on loan at Amiens SC)

=== Olympique Lyonnais ===
In:

No.	Pos.	Nation	Player
6	DF	BRA	Marcelo (from (Turkey) Beşiktaş)
7	MF	FRA	Clément Grenier (loan return from (Italy) AS Roma)
10	FW	BFA	Bertrand Traoré (from (England) Chelsea, previously on loan at (Netherlands) Ajax)
11	FW	DOM	Mariano Díaz (from (Spain) Real Madrid)
20	DF	BRA	Marçal (from (Portugal) S.L. Benfica, previously on loan at EA Guingamp)
22	DF	FRA	Ferland Mendy (from Havre AC)
23	DF	NED	Kenny Tete (from (Netherlands) Ajax)
24	MF	SEN	Pape Cheikh Diop (from (Spain) Celta Vigo)
28	MF	FRA	Tanguy Ndombele (from Amiens SC)

Out:

No.	Pos.	Nation	Player
3	DF	CMR	Nicolas N'Koulou (on loan to (Italy) Torino)
4	DF	ARG	Emanuel Mammana (to (Russia) Zenit St Petersburg)
8	MF	FRA	Corentin Tolisso (to (Germany) Bayern Munich)
10	FW	FRA	Alexandre Lacazette (to (England) Arsenal)
11	MF	ALG	Rachid Ghezzal (to AS Monaco)
13	DF	FRA	Christophe Jallet (to OGC Nice)
14	MF	ESP	Sergi Darder (on loan to (Spain) Espanyol)
19	FW	FRA	Jean-Philippe Mateta (on loan to Havre AC)
21	MF	FRA	Maxime Gonalons (to (Italy) AS Roma)
22	FW	FRA	Gaëtan Perrin (on loan to US Orléans)
23	DF	FRA	Jordy Gaspar (to Monaco)
26	FW	FRA	Aldo Kalulu (on loan to FC Sochaux, previously on loan at Stade Rennais)
28	MF	FRA	Mathieu Valbuena (to (Turkey) Fenerbahçe)
31	DF	POL	Maciej Rybus (to (Russia) Lokomotiv Moscow)
—	MF	FRA	Olivier Kemen (on loan to Gazélec Ajaccio, previously on loan)
—	MF	FRA	Romain Del Castillo (on loan to Nîmes Olympique, previously on loan at FC Bourg-Péronnas)
—	DF	MAR	Fahd Moufi (to (Portugal) CD Tondela, previously on loan at CS Sedan)

=== Olympique de Marseille ===
In:

No.	Pos.	Nation	Player
5	MF	ARG	Lucas Ocampos (loan return from (Italy) AC Milan)
9	FW	GRE	Kostas Mitroglou (from (Portugal) S.L. Benfica)
13	DF	TUN	Aymen Abdennour (on loan from (Spain) Valencia)
19	MF	BRA	Luiz Gustavo (from (Germany) VfL Wolfsburg)
23	DF	FRA	Adil Rami (from (Spain) Sevilla)
25	DF	FRA	Jordan Amavi (on loan from (England) Aston Villa)
26	MF	FRA	Florian Thauvin (from (England) Newcastle United, previously on loan)
28	FW	FRA	Valère Germain (from AS Monaco)
30	GK	FRA	Steve Mandanda (from (England) Crystal Palace)

Out:

No.	Pos.	Nation	Player
4	DF	NED	Karim Rekik (to (Germany) Hertha BSC)
5	MF	FRA	Abou Diaby (released)
7	MF	FRA	Rémy Cabella (on loan to AS Saint-Étienne)
16	GK	CGO	Brice Samba (to SM Caen)
18	FW	FRA	Bafétimbi Gomis (loan return to (Wales) Swansea City)
19	MF	FRA	William Vainqueur (loan return to (Italy) AS Roma)
20	MF	TUN	Saîf-Eddine Khaoui (on loan to ES Troyes AC)
22	FW	BEL	Aaron Leya Iseka (loan return to (Belgium) RSC Anderlecht)
23	MF	FRA	Zinedine Machach (loan return to Toulouse FC)
25	MF	NZL	Bill Tuiloma (to (United States) Portland Timbers)
28	FW	FRA	Antoine Rabillard (to AS Béziers)
29	FW	FRA	Jérémie Porsan-Clemente (to Montpellier HSC)
—	GK	FRA	Julien Fabri (to Stade Brestois, previously on loan at FC Bourg-Péronnas)
—	DF	FRA	Baptiste Aloé (to Valenciennes FC, previously on loan)
—	DF	FRA	Stéphane Sparagna (to (Portugal) Boavista F.C., previously on loan at AJ Auxerre)

=== FC Metz ===
In:

No.	Pos.	Nation	Player
2	DF	GER	Philipp Wollscheid (from (England) Stoke City, previously on loan at (Germany) VfL Wolfsburg)
5	MF	ARG	Gerónimo Poblete (from (Argentina) CA Colón)
9	FW	FRA	Nolan Roux (from AS Saint-Étienne)
10	MF	ARG	Brian Fernández (on loan from (Argentina) Racing Club, previously on loan at (Argentina) CA Colón)
14	FW	SEN	Ibrahima Niane (from (Senegal) Génération Foot)
17	MF	TOG	Mathieu Dossevi (on loan from (Belgium) Standard Liège)
21	DF	FRA	Moussa Niakhate (from Valenciennes FC)
26	MF	POR	Cafú (from FC Lorient)
29	FW	FRA	Emmanuel Rivière (from (England) Newcastle United, previously on loan at (Spain) Osasuna)
30	GK	FRA	Quentin Beunardeau (from (Belgium) AFC Tubize)

Out:

No.	Pos.	Nation	Player
5	DF	ARG	Guido Milán (to (Mexico) Veracruz)
6	DF	FRA	Simon Falette (to (Germany) Eintracht Frankfurt)
7	MF	FRA	Gauthier Hein (on loan to Tours FC)
9	FW	TUR	Mevlüt Erdinç (loan return to (Germany) Hannover 96)
13	DF	FRA	Franck Signorino (released)
14	MF	CMR	Georges Mandjeck (to (Czech Republic) Sparta Prague)
15	FW	FRA	Thibaut Vion (to Chamois Niortais)
17	FW	SEN	Habib Diallo (on loan to Stade Brestois, previously on loan)
18	FW	MLI	Cheick Diabaté (loan return to (Turkey) Osmanlispor)
22	MF	FRA	Kevin Lejeune (to AC Ajaccio)
26	FW	SEN	Ismaïla Sarr (to Stade Rennais)
30	GK	FRA	David Oberhauser (to (Greece) Platanias)
—	MF	MAR	Hamza Sakhi (on loan to AJ Auxerre, previously on loan at SAS Épinal)
—	FW	BFA	Moustapha Kaboré (on loan to (Belgium) RFC Seraing, previously on loan at CS Sedan)
—	FW	FRA	Boris Mathis (to (England) Everton)

=== AS Monaco ===
In:

No.	Pos.	Nation	Player
4	DF	NED	Terence Kongolo (from (Netherlands) Feyenoord)
7	MF	ALG	Rachid Ghezzal (from Olympique Lyonnais)
10	FW	MNE	Stevan Jovetić (from (Italy) Internazionale, previously on loan at (Spain) Sevilla)
14	FW	SEN	Keita Baldé (from (Italy) Lazio)
15	MF	FRA	Adama Diakhaby (from Stade Rennais)
16	GK	SUI	Diego Benaglio (from (Germany) VfL Wolfsburg)
17	MF	BEL	Youri Tielemans (from (Belgium) RSC Anderlecht)
18	MF	FRA	Soualiho Meïté (from (Belgium) Zulte-Waregem)
20	MF	POR	Rony Lopes (loan return from Lille OSC)
22	FW	ESP	Jordi Mboula (from (Spain) FC Barcelona)
28	MF	MLI	Adama Traoré (loan return from (Portugal) Rio Ave)
--	GK	ESP	Álvaro Fernández (from (Spain) Osasuna)
--	DF	FRA	Jordy Gaspar (from Lyon)

Out:

No.	Pos.	Nation	Player
7	MF	MAR	Nabil Dirar (to (Turkey) Fenerbahçe)
10	MF	POR	Bernardo Silva (to (England) Manchester City)
14	MF	FRA	Tiémoué Bakayoko (to (England) Chelsea)
16	GK	ITA	Morgan De Sanctis (released)
18	FW	FRA	Valère Germain (to Olympique de Marseille)
21	DF	NGR	Elderson Echiejile (to (Turkey) Sivasspor, previously on loan at (Spain) Sporting de Gijón)
23	DF	FRA	Benjamin Mendy (to (England) Manchester City)
29	FW	FRA	Kylian Mbappé (on loan to Paris SG)
31	MF	POR	Gil Dias (on loan to (Italy) Fiorentina, previously on loan at (Portugal) Rio Ave)
34	DF	FRA	Abdou Diallo (to (Germany) Mainz 05)
37	FW	FRA	Irvin Cardona (on loan to (Belgium) Cercle Brugge)
—	DF	FRA	Jordy Gaspar (on loan to (Belgium) Cercle Brugge)
—	MF	MAR	Youssef Aït Bennasser (on loan to SM Caen, previously on loan at AS Nancy)
—	MF	FRA	Jonathan Mexique (on loan to (Belgium) Cercle Brugge, previously on loan at Red Star FC)
—	MF	FRA	Tristan Muyumba (on loan to (Belgium) Cercle Brugge)
—	MF	POR	Rúben Vinagre (on loan to (England) Wolverhampton Wanderers)
—	MF	FRA	Allan Saint-Maximin (to OGC Nice, previously on loan at SC Bastia)
—	FW	FRA	Corentin Jean (to Toulouse FC, previously on loan)
—	FW	CIV	Lacina Traoré (on loan to AS Monaco, previously on loan at (Spain) Sporting de Gijón)

=== Montpellier HSC ===
In:

No.	Pos.	Nation	Player
2	DF	FRA	Ruben Aguilar (from AJ Auxerre)
5	DF	POR	Pedro Mendes (from Stade Rennais)
6	MF	FRA	Junior Sambia (on loan from Chamois Niortais)
9	MF	FRA	Jonathan Ikoné (on loan from Paris Saint-Germain, previously on loan)
11	FW	FRA	Kévin Bérigaud (loan return from Angers SCO)
14	FW	CIV	Giovanni Sio (from Stade Rennais)
17	FW	FRA	Jérémie Porsan-Clemente (from Olympique de Marseille)
27	MF	URU	Facundo Píriz (from (Russia) FC Akhmat Grozny)
40	GK	FRA	Benjamin Lecomte (from FC Lorient)

Out:

No.	Pos.	Nation	Player
2	DF	SEN	Mamadou N'Diaye (to US Avranches)
5	MF	MLI	Yacouba Sylla (loan return to Stade Rennais)
6	MF	FRA	Joris Marveaux (to Gazélec Ajaccio)
8	MF	FRA	Bryan Passi (on loan to Havre AC)
10	MF	ALG	Ryad Boudebouz (to (Spain) Betis)
15	FW	BEN	Steve Mounié (to (England) Huddersfield Town)
16	GK	FRA	Geoffrey Jourdren (to AS Nancy)
25	DF	FRA	Mathieu Deplagne (to ES Troyes AC)
28	DF	COD	Cédric Mongongu (released)
30	GK	FRA	Jonathan Ligali (on loan to USL Dunkerque)

=== FC Nantes ===
In:

No.	Pos.	Nation	Player
4	DF	FRA	Nicolas Pallois (from Girondins de Bordeaux)
12	DF	NGR	Chidozie Awaziem (on loan from (Portugal) FC Porto)
14	MF	BEL	Yassine El Ghanassy (from (Belgium) KV Oostende)
20	MF	BRA	Andrei Girotto (from (Brazil) Chapecoense)
21	MF	SLO	Rene Krhin (on loan from (Spain) Granada CF)
23	MF	BEL	Joris Kayembe (from (Portugal) FC Porto)
26	FW	MLI	Kalifa Coulibaly (from (Belgium) KAA Gent)
30	GK	ROU	Ciprian Tătărușanu (from (Italy) Fiorentina)
—	MF	FRA	Roli Pereira de Sa (from Paris SG)
—	MF	NED	Queensy Menig (from (Netherlands) Ajax Amsterdam, previously on loan at (Netherlands) PEC Zwolle)

Out:

No.	Pos.	Nation	Player
1	GK	FRA	Rémy Riou (to (Turkey) Alanyaspor)
4	DF	VEN	Oswaldo Vizcarrondo (to ES Troyes AC)
14	MF	FRA	Amine Harit (to (Germany) Schalke 04)
18	FW	POL	Mariusz Stępiński (on loan to (Italy) Chievo Verona)
23	MF	POR	Sergio Oliveira (loan return to (Portugal) FC Porto)
27	MF	BEL	Guillaume Gillet (to (Greece) Olympiacos)
—	MF	NED	Queensy Menig (on loan to (England) Oldham Athletic)
—	FW	VEN	Fernando Aristeguieta (to (Venezuela) Caracas FC, previously on loan at (Portugal) CD Nacional)

=== OGC Nice ===
In:

No.	Pos.	Nation	Player
4	DF	BRA	Marlon (on loan from (Spain) FC Barcelona)
5	MF	FRA	Adrien Tameze (from Valenciennes FC)
7	MF	FRA	Allan Saint-Maximin (from AS Monaco, previously on loan at SC Bastia)
8	MF	FRA	Pierre Lees-Melou (from Dijon FCO)
10	MF	NED	Wesley Sneijder (from (Turkey) Galatasaray)
12	DF	SEN	Racine Coly (from (Italy) Brescia)
21	MF	FRA	Nampalys Mendy (on loan from (England) Leicester City)
24	DF	FRA	Christophe Jallet (from Olympique Lyonnais)
27	MF	FRA	Jean-Victor Makengo (from SM Caen)

Out:

No.	Pos.	Nation	Player
1	GK	FRA	Mouez Hassen (on loan to La Berrichonne de Châteauroux, previously on loan at (England) Southampton)
4	DF	FRA	Paul Baysse (to (Spain) Málaga)
5	MF	MAR	Younès Belhanda (loan return to (Ukraine) Dynamo Kyiv)
8	MF	MAR	Mounir Obbadi (released)
13	MF	FRA	Valentin Eysseric (to (Italy) Fiorentina)
21	DF	POR	Ricardo Pereira (loan return to (Portugal) FC Porto)
22	FW	GRE	Anastasios Donis (loan return to (Italy) Juventus)
23	FW	FRA	Alexy Bosetti (to Stade Lavallois)
28	DF	FRA	Olivier Boscagli (on loan to Nîmes Olympique)
29	DF	BRA	Dalbert Henrique (to (Italy) Internazionale)
—	MF	ALG	Saïd Benrahma (on loan to La Berrichonne de Châteauroux, previously on loan at Gazélec Ajaccio)
—	FW	FRA	Dorian Caddy (to US Quevilly-Rouen, previously on loan at Clermont Foot)
—	FW	FRA	Franck Honorat (to Clermont Foot, previously on loan at FC Sochaux-Montbéliard)

=== Paris Saint-Germain F.C. ===
In:

No.	Pos.	Nation	Player
10	FW	BRA	Neymar (from (Spain) FC Barcelona)
17	DF	ESP	Yuri Berchiche (from (Spain) Real Sociedad)
29	FW	FRA	Kylian Mbappé (on loan from AS Monaco)
32	DF	BRA	Dani Alves (from (Italy) Juventus)

Out:

No.	Pos.	Nation	Player
4	MF	POL	Grzegorz Krychowiak (on loan to (England) West Bromwich Albion)
14	MF	FRA	Blaise Matuidi (to (Italy) Juventus)
15	MF	POR	Gonçalo Guedes (on loan to (Spain) Valencia)
17	DF	BRA	Maxwell (retired)
19	DF	CIV	Serge Aurier (to (England) Tottenham Hotspur)
22	FW	ESP	Jesé (on loan to (England) Stoke City, previously on loan at (Spain) Las Palmas)
29	FW	FRA	Jean-Kévin Augustin (to (Germany) RB Leipzig)
30	GK	ITA	Salvatore Sirigu (to (Italy) Torino, previously on loan at (Spain) Osasuna)
—	DF	FRA	Youssouf Sabaly (to Girondins de Bordeaux, previously on loan)
—	DF	FRA	Dylan Batubinsika (to (Belgium) Royal Antwerp)
—	MF	FRA	Roli Pereira de Sal (to FC Nantes)
—	MF	FRA	Jonathan Ikoné (on loan to Montpellier HSC, previously on loan)
—	MF	FRA	Gaëtan Robail (on loan to (Belgium) Cercle Brugge)
—	FW	FRA	Jean-Christophe Bahebeck (on loan to (Netherlands) FC Utrecht, previously on loan at (Italy) Pescara)
—	FW	FRA	Odsonne Edouard (on loan to (Scotland) Celtic Glasgow, previously on loan at Toulouse FC)
—	FW	CIV	Wilfried Kanga (to Angers SCO, previously on loan at US Créteil)

=== Stade Rennais F.C. ===
In:

No.	Pos.	Nation	Player
1	GK	FRA	Abdoulaye Diallo (loan return from (Turkey) Rizespor)
7	FW	SEN	Ismaïla Sarr (from FC Metz)
8	MF	TUN	Wahbi Khazri (on loan from (England) Sunderland)
11	MF	ESP	Brandon Thomas (from (Spain) RCD Mallorca)
14	MF	FRA	Benjamin Bourigeaud (from RC Lens)
17	MF	FRA	Faitout Maouassa (from AS Nancy)
19	FW	FRA	Jordan Tell (from SM Caen)
27	DF	MLI	Hamari Traoré (from Stade de Reims)
33	FW	RSA	Kermit Erasmus (loan return from RC Lens)
40	GK	CZE	Tomáš Koubek (from (Czech Republic) Sparta Prague)
--	FW	FRA	Anthony Ribelin (loan return from Paris FC)

Out:

No.	Pos.	Nation	Player
1	GK	FRA	Benoît Costil (to Girondins de Bordeaux)
5	DF	POR	Pedro Mendes (to Montpellier HSC)
6	MF	SUI	Gélson Fernandes (to (Germany) Eintracht Frankfurt)
8	MF	FRA	Clément Chantome (on loan to RC Lens)
11	FW	FRA	Wesley Said (to Dijon FCO)
13	FW	CIV	Giovanni Sio (to Montpellier HSC)
14	FW	FRA	Aldo Kalulu (loan return to Olympique Lyonnais)
17	DF	ALB	Ermir Lenjani (to (Switzerland) FC Sion)
19	DF	FRA	Dimitri Cavaré (to (England) Barnsley FC)
20	MF	MLI	Yacouba Sylla (on loan to (Greece) Panathinaikos, previously on loan at Montpellier HSC)
22	DF	FRA	Sylvain Armand (retired)
31	MF	FRA	Adama Diakhaby (to AS Monaco)
—	MF	FRA	Denis Will Poha (on loan to US Orléans)

=== AS Saint-Étienne ===
In:

No.	Pos.	Nation	Player
3	DF	GRE	Alexandros Katranis (from (Greece) Atromitos)
8	MF	SEN	Assane Diousse (from (Italy) Empoli)
9	FW	FRA	Loïs Diony (from Dijon FCO)
10	MF	FRA	Rémy Cabella (on loan from Olympique de Marseille)
11	DF	BRA	Gabriel Silva (from (Italy) Udinese)
14	MF	FRA	Jonathan Bamba (loan return from Angers SCO)
15	DF	SUI	Saidy Janko (from (Scotland) Celtic, previously on loan at (England) Barnsley FC)
20	MF	BRA	Hernani (on loan from (Russia) Zenit St Petersburg)

Out:

No.	Pos.	Nation	Player
3	DF	FRA	Pierre-Yves Polomat (on loan to AJ Auxerre)
6	MF	FRA	Jérémy Clément (to AS Nancy)
8	MF	FRA	Benjamin Corgnet (to RC Strasbourg)
9	FW	FRA	Nolan Roux (to FC Metz)
10	MF	MAR	Oussama Tannane (on loan to (Spain) Las Palmas)
11	MF	SEN	Henri Saivet (loan return to (England) Newcastle United)
18	MF	FRA	Fabien Lemoine (to FC Lorient)
25	DF	FRA	Kevin Malcuit (to Lille OSC)
26	FW	POR	Jorginho (on loan to (Portugal) Chaves)
27	FW	SLO	Robert Berić (on loan to (Belgium) RSC Anderlecht)
32	MF	FRA	Arnaud Nordin (on loan to AS Nancy)
—	FW	FRA	Neal Maupay (to (England) Brentford, previously on loan at Stade Brestois)
—	FW	CGO	Dylan Saint-Louis (to Paris FC, previously on loan at Stade Lavallois)

=== RC Strasbourg Alsace ===
In:

No.	Pos.	Nation	Player
2	DF	FRA	Dimitri Foulquier (on loan from (England) Watford)
4	DF	FRA	Pablo Martinez (from Angers SCO)
9	FW	ALG	Idriss Saadi (from (Wales) Cardiff City, previously on loan at (Belgium) KV Kortrijk)
10	MF	FRA	Benjamin Corgnet (from AS Saint-Étienne)
20	FW	FRA	Martin Terrier (on loan from Lille OSC)
26	DF	BFA	Bakary Koné (on loan from (Spain) Málaga)
27	DF	FRA	Kenny Lala (from RC Lens)
28	MF	FRA	Jonas Martin (from (Spain) Betis)
29	FW	CPV	Nuno da Costa (from Valenciennes FC)
30	GK	FRA	Bingourou Kamara (from Tours FC)

Out:

No.	Pos.	Nation	Player
9	FW	BEL	Baptiste Guillaume (loan return to Lille OSC)
14	MF	SEN	Oumar Pouye (to US Créteil, previously on loan at US Quevilly-Rouen)
18	MF	SEN	Mayoro N'Doye (to Tours FC)
20	DF	FRA	Laurent Dos Santos (to Valenciennes FC)
23	DF	BRA	Felipe Saad (to FC Lorient)
24	DF	FRA	Eric Marester (released)
28	MF	FRA	Vincent Gragnic (released)
29	FW	MAR	Khalid Boutaib (to (Turkey) Yeni Malatyaspor)
—	MF	FRA	Abdelhak Belhameur (to US Avranches, previously on loan at US Créteil)
—	MF	FRA	Massiré Kanté (to FC Martigues, previously on loan at CS Sedan)
—	FW	FRA	Hicham Benkaid (to US Orléans)

=== Toulouse FC ===
In:

No.	Pos.	Nation	Player
4	MF	FRA	Yannick Cahuzac (from SC Bastia)
7	MF	FRA	Zinedine Machach (loan return from Olympique de Marseille)
8	FW	FRA	Corentin Jean (from AS Monaco, previously on loan)
9	FW	FRA	Yaya Sanogo (from (England) Arsenal, previously on loan at (England) Charlton Athletic)
15	FW	CIV	Max-Alain Gradel (on loan from (England) AFC Bournemouth)
18	DF	CPV	Steven Fortes (from Havre AC)
25	MF	FRA	Giannelli Imbula (on loan from (England) Stoke City)

Out:

No.	Pos.	Nation	Player
3	DF	GAB	Yrondu Musavu-King (loan return to (Italy) Udinese)
4	MF	MLI	Tongo Doumbia (to (Croatia) Dinamo Zagreb)
7	DF	CIV	Jean-Daniel Akpa Akpro (released)
8	MF	COD	Dodi Lukebakio (loan return to (Belgium) RSC Anderlecht)
9	FW	DEN	Martin Braithwaite (to (England) Middlesbrough)
10	MF	ARG	Óscar Trejo (to (Spain) Rayo Vallecano)
14	MF	FRA	Pantxi Sirieix (retired)
15	DF	SRB	Uroš Spajić (to (Belgium) RSC Anderlecht, previously on loan)
18	FW	FRA	Odsonne Edouard (loan return to Paris Saint-Germain)
22	DF	SRB	Dušan Veškovac (released)
24	DF	SRB	Pavle Ninkov (released)
25	MF	FRA	Jessy Pi (on loan to Stade Brestois)
—	MF	FRA	Mathieu Cafaro (to Stade de Reims)
—	MF	POL	Dominik Furman (to (Poland) Wisła Płock, previously on loan)
—	FW	SRB	Aleksandar Pešić (to (Serbia) Red Star Belgrade, previously on loan at (Italy) Atalanta)

=== Troyes AC ===
In:

No.	Pos.	Nation	Player
3	DF	BRA	Gabriel Magalhães (on loan from Lille OSC)
4	DF	VEN	Oswaldo Vizcarrondo (from FC Nantes)
9	FW	KOR	Suk Hyun-Jun (on loan from (Portugal) FC Porto, previously on loan at (Hungary) Debrecen)
12	DF	FRA	Mathieu Deplagne (from Montpellier HSC)
13	MF	TUN	Saîf-Eddine Khaoui (on loan from Olympique de Marseille)
14	MF	FRA	François Bellugou (from FC Lorient)
28	MF	FRA	Bryan Pelé (from Stade Brestois)

Out:

No.	Pos.	Nation	Player
4	DF	FRA	Johan Martial (to (Israel) Maccabi Petah Tikva)
5	DF	CGO	Randi Goteni (on loan to AS Béziers)
7	FW	FRA	Mour Paye (to US Créteil)
11	DF	BRA	Rincón (released)
14	MF	BRA	Thiago Xavier (to Valenciennes FC)
21	DF	MLI	Mahamadou N'Diaye (released)

== Ligue 2 ==
=== AC Ajaccio ===
In:

No.	Pos.	Nation	Player
6	MF	FRA	Mathieu Coutadeur (from Stade Lavallois)
10	FW	FRA	Yoane Wissa (on loan from Angers SCO, previously on loan at Stade Lavallois)
14	MF	ALB	Qazim Laci (on loan from (Greece) Olympiacos)
15	DF	FRA	Jérôme Hergault (from Red Star FC)
21	DF	FRA	Cédric Avinel (from Clermont Foot)
22	MF	FRA	Kevin Lejeune (from FC Metz)
26	FW	FRA	Ghislain Gimbert (from Havre AC)
27	DF	FRA	Anthony Marin (from Nîmes Olympique)
30	GK	FRA	Jean-Louis Leca (from SC Bastia)
--	MF	FRA	Mathieu Coquin (from Girondins de Bordeaux)
--	MF	FRA	Albert Makiadi (from Girondins de Bordeaux)

Out:

No.	Pos.	Nation	Player
3	DF	FRA	Paul Babiloni (released)
6	DF	SEN	Pape Abou Cissé (loan return to (Greece) Olympiacos)
8	DF	FRA	Laurent Abergel (to AS Nancy)
9	FW	FRA	Ilyes Chaïbi (loan return to AS Monaco)
11	FW	FRA	Mouaad Madri (to RC Lens)
15	MF	MAR	Rayan Frikeche (released)
16	GK	CMR	Jules Goda (to Tours FC)
19	MF	FRA	Alioune Fall (released)
20	DF	FRA	Anthony Lippini (released)
26	DF	FRA	Jordan Pierre-Charles (to Valenciennes FC)
27	DF	COM	Kassim Abdallah (to (Saudi Arabia) Al-Raed)
28	FW	NIG	Moussa Maazou (to RC Lens)

=== AJ Auxerre ===
In:

No.	Pos.	Nation	Player
2	DF	HAI	Carlens Arcus (on loan from (Belgium) Cercle Brugge)
3	DF	FRA	Pierre-Yves Polomat (on loan from AS Saint-Étienne)
4	MF	FRA	Mickael Barreto (from US Orléans)
5	DF	MTN	Abdoul Ba (from RC Lens)
8	MF	BEN	Jordan Adeoti (from SM Caen)
9	FW	SEN	Pape Sané (on loan from SM Caen)
12	MF	MLI	Birama Touré (from (Belgium) Standard Liège, previously on loan)
16	GK	USA	Quentin Westberg (from Tours FC)
17	DF	COM	Benjaloud Youssouf (from US Orléans)
18	FW	GUI	Mohamed Yattara (from (Belgium) Standard Liège, previously on loan)
21	MF	MAR	Hamza Sakhi (on loan from FC Metz, previously on loan at SAS Épinal)
23	DF	SEN	Yaya Sané (on loan from (Turkey) Bursaspor, previously on loan)
26	FW	SLO	Ivan Firer (from (Slovenia) NK Domžale)
28	MF	FRA	Romain Philippoteaux (from FC Lorient)

Out:

No.	Pos.	Nation	Player
2	DF	FRA	Ruben Aguilar (to Montpellier HSC)
4	MF	FRA	Lionel Mathis (retired)
8	MF	FRA	Samed Kilic (released)
11	MF	MTN	Adama Ba (to (Turkey) Gazisehir Gaziantep)
16	GK	FRA	Xavier Lenogue (on loan to FC Pau)
17	DF	FRA	Baba Traoré (to Havre AC)
18	FW	FRA	Gaëtan Courtet (to FC Lorient)
21	DF	FRA	Rémi Fournier (retired)
25	MF	FRA	Romain Montiel (on loan to FC Chambly)
—	MF	CGO	Hardy Binguila (released)

=== Football Bourg-en-Bresse Péronnas 01 ===
In:

No.	Pos.	Nation	Player
4	DF	FRA	Grégoire Amiot (from Stade de Reims)
13	DF	FRA	Pape Paye (from FC Lorient)
14	FW	SEN	Adama Sarr (from Les Herbiers VF)
30	GK	FRA	Gaëtan Deneuve (from Fréjus Saint-Raphaël)

Out:

No.	Pos.	Nation	Player
4	DF	CGO	Bruce Abdoulaye
6	DF	CGO	Clevid Dikamona (to (Greece) Platanias)
7	MF	FRA	Romain Del Castillo (loan return to Olympique Lyonnais)
8	MF	FRA	Jason Berthomier (to Stade Brestois)
27	MF	FRA	Loïc Damour (to (Wales) Cardiff City)
30	GK	FRA	Julien Fabri (loan return to Olympique de Marseille)

=== Stade Brestois 29 ===
In:

No.	Pos.	Nation	Player
3	DF	BEN	David Kiki (from Chamois Niortais)
7	MF	FRA	Jason Berthomier (from FC Bourg-Péronnas)
9	FW	FRA	Kevin Mayi (from (Netherlands) NEC Nijmegen)
11	FW	FRA	Edouard Butin (from Valenciennes FC)
14	DF	FRA	Anthony Weber (from Stade de Reims)
20	FW	SEN	Habib Diallo (on loan from FC Metz, previously on loan)
21	DF	CMR	Jean-Charles Castelletto (from (Belgium) Club Brugge, previously on loan at Red Star FC)
23	MF	FRA	Mathias Autret (from RC Lens)
24	MF	FRA	Jessy Pi (on loan from Toulouse FC)
26	FW	CGO	Exauce Ngassaki (from SM Caen)
30	GK	FRA	Julien Fabri (from Olympique de Marseille, previously on loan at FC Bourg-Péronnas)

Out:

No.	Pos.	Nation	Player
3	DF	FRA	Louis Nganioni (loan return to Olympique Lyonnais)
7	MF	FRA	Valentin Lavigne (loan return to FC Lorient)
8	MF	MLI	Cheick Chérif Doumbia (released, previously on loan at CA Bastia)
10	MF	ITA	Cristian Battocchio (to (Israel) Maccabi Tel Aviv)
11	MF	FRA	Bryan Pelé (to ES Troyes AC)
14	DF	BRA	Luciano Castán (to (Qatar) Al-Khor SC)
21	FW	FRA	Neal Maupay (loan return to AS Saint-Étienne)
23	MF	FRA	Manuel Perez (to Clermont Foot)
28	FW	FRA	Steven Joseph-Monrose (to (Azerbaijan) Gabala FK)
30	GK	FRA	Joan Hartock (to US Quevilly-Rouen)

=== LB Châteauroux ===
In:

No.	Pos.	Nation	Player
2	DF	COM	Chaker Alhadhur (on loan from SM Caen)
5	DF	FRA	Grégory Bourillon (from Angers SCO)
6	MF	SEN	Sidy Sarr (on loan from (Belgium) KV Kortrijk)
10	MF	ALG	Saïd Benrahma (on loan from OGC Nice, previously on loan at Gazélec Ajaccio)
13	FW	FRA	Christophe Mandanne (from AS Nancy)
18	MF	SEN	Fallou Niang (from (Tunisia) CS Sfaxien)
21	MF	CIV	Christopher Operi (on loan from SM Caen)
23	FW	FRA	Yann Mabella (on loan from AS Nancy)
27	DF	FRA	Cheick Traoré (on loan from EA Guingamp)
28	MF	FRA	Maxime Barthelme (from FC Lorient)
40	GK	FRA	Mouez Hassen (on loan from OGC Nice, previously on loan at (England) Southampton)

Out:

No.	Pos.	Nation	Player
6	DF	FRA	Guillaume Dequaire (to Les Herbiers VF)
9	MF	BFA	Souleymane Sawadogo (released)
10	MF	FRA	Adil Lebrun (released)
11	FW	FRA	Jordan Siebatcheu (loan return to Stade de Reims)
13	FW	FRA	Clément Depres (loan return to Nîmes Olympique)
21	DF	FRA	Judicaël Crillon (to FC Pau)
23	MF	CIV	Eric Tié Bi (to US Quevilly-Rouen)
26	MF	FRA	Laurent Héloïse (to FC Chambly)
27	DF	FRA	Cheikh Traoré (to EA Guingamp)
34	DF	CMR	Calvin Mangan (to CS Sedan, previously on loan at SO Romorantin)

=== Clermont Foot ===
In:

No.	Pos.	Nation	Player
2	DF	BUL	Martin Kavdanski (from (Bulgaria) FC Lokomotiv Gorna Oryahovitsa)
3	FW	CGO	Fodé Doré (on loan from Angers SCO)
7	MF	FRA	Nicolas Gavory (from AS Béziers)
9	FW	FRA	Franck Honorat (from OGC Nice, previously on loan at FC Sochaux-Montbéliard)
10	MF	FRA	Manuel Perez (from Stade Brestois)
11	FW	FRA	Alassane N'Diaye (from (Saudi Arabia) Al-Taawoun FC)
20	DF	FRA	Ludovic Soares (from Red Star FC)
23	DF	FRA	Jérôme Phojo (from Les Herbiers VF)
28	MF	FRA	David Douline (from Le Puy Foot)
40	GK	FRA	Paul Bernardoni (on loan from Bordeaux)

Out:

No.	Pos.	Nation	Player
1	GK	FRA	Marc-Aurèle Caillard (to EA Guingamp)
2	DF	FRA	Cyriaque Rivieyran (to Chamois Niortais)
3	DF	FRA	Baptiste Martin (released)
4	DF	FRA	Cédric Avinel (to AC Ajaccio)
6	MF	CMR	Eugène Ekobo (released)
9	FW	SEN	Mamadou Thiam (loan return to Dijon FCO)
10	MF	FRA	Ludovic Genest (to ASF Andrezieux)
11	MF	FRA	Wesley Jobello (to Gazélec Ajaccio)
20	DF	FRA	Jacques Salze (to US Quevilly-Rouen)
22	DF	COD	Brandon Agounon (on loan to US Boulogne)
23	FW	FRA	Dorian Caddy (loan return to OGC Nice)

=== Gazélec Ajaccio ===
In:

No.	Pos.	Nation	Player
1	GK	FRA	Maxime Cassara (from AS Lyon-Duchère)
2	DF	FRA	Grégoire Puel (from Havre AC)
3	DF	SEN	Ousseynou Ba (from (Algeria) JS Kabylie)
6	MF	FRA	Joris Marveaux (from Montpellier HSC)
7	MF	FRA	Steeven Ribery (from US Boulogne)
8	FW	FRA	Romain Armand (from US Orléans)
14	MF	POR	Alexis Araujo (on loan from Lille OSC, previously on loan at USL Dunkerque)
15	DF	FRA	Damien Dumont (from Espérance Pernoise)
19	FW	FRA	David Gomis (from SC Toulon)
20	MF	FRA	Olivier Kemen (on loan from Olympique Lyonnais, previously on loan)
21	MF	FRA	Wesley Jobello (from Clermont Foot)
23	MF	FRA	Julien Anziani (from AC Ajaccio)
24	DF	POL	Damien Perquis (from (England) Nottingham Forest)
28	FW	MLI	Fousseni Diabaté (from EA Guingamp)

Out:

No.	Pos.	Nation	Player
1	GK	FRA	Clément Maury (released)
6	DF	FRA	David Ducourtioux (retired)
10	FW	TUN	Rafik Boujedra (to US Quevilly-Rouen)
15	DF	SEN	Christophe Diedhiou (to (Belgium) Royal Excel Mouscron)
16	GK	FRA	Cyril Fogacci (on loan to AS Poissy)
18	MF	CAF	Amos Youga (to Havre AC)
20	MF	FRA	Louis Poggi (to FC Bastia-Borgo)
21	FW	CIV	Sekou Cissé (to (Cyprus) Anorthosis)
24	FW	COD	John Tshibumbu (to Tours FC)
27	MF	ALG	Saïd Benrahma (loan return to OGC Nice)

=== Le Havre AC ===
In:

No.	Pos.	Nation	Player
1	GK	MLI	Oumar Sissoko (from US Orléans)
3	MF	FRA	Bryan Passi (on loan from Montpellier HSC)
6	MF	MLI	Abdoulaye Keita (from SC Bastia)
9	FW	MLI	Mana Dembélé (loan return from Stade Lavallois)
11	FW	FRA	Jean-Philippe Mateta (on loan from Olympique Lyonnais)
12	FW	CGO	Bevic Moussiti-Oko (from USL Dunkerque)
18	MF	CAF	Amos Youga (from Gazélec Ajaccio)
19	DF	BFA	Yacouba Coulibaly (from (Burkina Faso) RC Bobo Dioulasso)
20	DF	FRA	Baba Traoré (from AJ Auxerre)
23	MF	FRA	Dylan Louiserre (loan return from US Avranches)
26	FW	ALG	Tayeb Meziani (on loan from (Algeria) Paradou AC)
30	GK	FRA	Alexandre Marfaing (from Red Star FC)
—	MF	MAR	Nabil Cherkaoui (from (Belgium) Standard Liège)

Out:

No.	Pos.	Nation	Player
1	GK	FRA	Stephen Milosavljevic (to FC Mulhouse)
2	DF	MAR	Issam Chebake (to (Turkey) Yeni Malatyaspor)
3	DF	FRA	Ferland Mendy (to Olympique Lyonnais)
10	FW	FRA	Mathieu Duhamel (to US Quevilly-Rouen)
17	MF	FRA	Sébastien Salles-Lamonge (loan return to Stade Rennais)
18	DF	CPV	Steven Fortes (to Toulouse FC)
20	DF	FRA	Grégoire Puel (to Gazélec Ajaccio)
26	DF	FRA	Cédric Cambon (to US Orléans)
27	FW	FRA	Ghislain Gimbert (to AC Ajaccio)
30	GK	BEN	Fabien Farnolle (to (Turkey) Yeni Malatyaspor)
—	MF	MAR	Tarik Tissoudali (on loan to (Netherlands) VVV-Venlo, previously on loan at (Netherlands) SC Cambuur)

=== RC Lens ===
In:

No.	Pos.	Nation	Player
5	DF	BRA	Dankler (on loan from (Portugal) Estoril)
7	DF	ESP	Álvaro Lemos (on loan from (Spain) Celta Vigo)
18	MF	MLI	Souleymane Diarra (on loan from (Hungary) Újpest FC)
19	DF	FRA	Frédéric Duplus (from (Belgium) Royal Antwerp)
21	DF	GRE	Christos Tasoulis (on loan from (Greece) Panionios)
22	MF	SRB	Filip Marković (from (Belgium) Royal Excel Mouscron)
23	DF	EGY	Karim Hafez (on loan from (Belgium) Lierse S.K., previously on loan)
24	FW	CRO	Ivan Lendrić (from (Bosnia and Herzegovina) FK Željezničar)
25	FW	NIG	Moussa Maazou (from AC Ajaccio)
27	FW	FRA	Mouaad Madri (from AC Ajaccio)
29	MF	FRA	Clément Chantôme (on loan from Stade Rennais)
--	MF	BFA	Cyrille Bayala (from (Moldova) Sheriff Tiraspol)

Out:

No.	Pos.	Nation	Player
5	DF	MTN	Abdoul Ba (to AJ Auxerre)
7	MF	BFA	Adama Guira (to (Denmark) Aarhus GF)
8	FW	RSA	Kermit Erasmus (loan return to Stade Rennais)
10	FW	CAF	Habib Habibou (to Qatar SC)
18	MF	FRA	Akim Zedadka (released)
19	MF	FRA	Mathias Autret (to Stade Brestois)
21	DF	FRA	Anthony Scaramozzino (to Stade Lavallois)
24	DF	GHA	Daniel Opare (loan return to (Germany) FC Augsburg)
27	DF	FRA	Kenny Lala (to RC Strasbourg)
29	MF	FRA	Benjamin Bourigeaud (to Stade Rennais)
—	DF	FRA	Stéphane Besle (to (Switzerland) FC Aarau, previously on loan)
—	DF	FRA	Maxence Carlier (on loan to (Belgium) AFC Tubize)
—	MF	FRA	Aristote Madiani (to US Quevilly-Rouen, previously on loan at Paris FC)
—	MF	GRE	Viktor Klonaridis (to (Greece) AEK Athens, previously on loan at (Greece) Panathinaikos)
—	MF	FRA	Simon Banza (on loan to (Luxembourg) CS Pétange, previously on loan at AS Béziers)
—	FW	SRB	Miloš Zukanović (to Red Star FC)

=== FC Lorient ===
In:

No.	Pos.	Nation	Player
6	MF	FRA	Fabien Lemoine (from AS Saint-Étienne)
8	MF	FRA	Gaël Danic (from SC Bastia)
11	DF	COM	Faiz Selemani (loan return from Tours FC)
13	DF	BRA	Felipe Saad (from RC Strasbourg)
14	DF	FRA	Lindsay Rose (loan return from SC Bastia)
22	FW	FRA	Gaëtan Courtet (from AJ Auxerre)
24	MF	CMR	Franklin Wadja (from Vendée Fontenay Foot)
26	MF	GAB	Denis Bouanga (loan return from Tours FC)
30	GK	MNE	Danijel Petković (from (Hungary) MTK Budapest)
--	DF	FRA	Mamadou Kamissoko (from Bergerac Périgord FC)

Out:

No.	Pos.	Nation	Player
6	MF	FRA	François Bellugou (to ES Troyes AC)
8	MF	POR	Cafú (to FC Metz)
12	FW	CMR	Benjamin Moukandjo (to (China) Jiangsu Suning)
13	DF	FRA	Michaël Ciani (released)
14	FW	FRA	Jérémie Aliadière (released)
15	DF	FRA	Mathieu Peybernes (on loan to (Turkey) Göztepe)
19	MF	FRA	Romain Philippoteaux (to AJ Auxerre)
22	FW	FRA	Benjamin Jeannot (to Dijon FCO)
23	MF	GHA	Alhassan Wakaso (to (Portugal) Vitória de Guimarães)
24	DF	NCL	Wesley Lautoa (to Dijon FCO)
26	MF	FRA	Issam Ben Khémis (to (England) Doncaster Rovers)
28	MF	FRA	Maxime Barthelme (to La Berrichonne de Châteauroux)
29	DF	FRA	Pape Paye (to FC Bourg-Péronnas)
40	GK	FRA	Benjamin Lecomte (to Montpellier HSC)
—	DF	FRA	Bradley Mazikou (on loan to USL Dunkerque)
—	DF	GAB	Yoann Wachter (released, previously on loan at CS Sedan)
—	MF	FRA	Marvin Gakpa (to US Quevilly-Rouen, previously on loan at AC Ajaccio)
—	MF	FRA	Valentin Lavigne (on loan to Paris FC, previously on loan at Stade Brestois)

=== AS Nancy ===
In:

No.	Pos.	Nation	Player
2	DF	TUN	Alaeddine Yahia (from SM Caen)
10	MF	FRA	Arnaud Nordin (on loan from AS Saint-Étienne)
11	MF	FRA	Jérémy Clément (from AS Saint-Étienne)
18	DF	FRA	Nicolas Saint-Ruf (from SC Bastia)
19	DF	FRA	Laurent Abergel (from AC Ajaccio)
24	FW	SLO	Patrik Eler (from (Austria) Wacker Innsbruck)
30	GK	FRA	Geoffrey Jourdren (from Montpellier HSC)

Out:

No.	Pos.	Nation	Player
5	MF	FRA	Alou Diarra (released)
6	MF	MAR	Youssef Aït Bennasser (loan return to AS Monaco)
9	FW	FRA	Maurice Dalé (to (Turkey) Giresunspor)
10	FW	SEN	Issiar Dia (to (Turkey) Yeni Malatyaspor)
11	FW	FRA	Karim Coulibaly (to (Netherlands) Willem II)
12	FW	FRA	Christophe Mandanne (to La Berrichonne de Châteauroux)
17	MF	FRA	Faitout Maouassa (to Stade Rennais)
18	MF	MTN	Diallo Guidileye (to (Turkey) Gençlerbirliği)
19	MF	FRA	Loic Puyo (to Angers SCO)
22	FW	FRA	Yann Mabella (on loan to La Berrichonne de Châteauroux)
24	DF	URU	Erick Cabaco (loan return to (Uruguay) Nacional)
—	MF	FRA	Michaël Cuisance (to (Germany) Borussia Mönchengladbach)

=== Nîmes Olympique ===
In:

No.	Pos.	Nation	Player
3	DF	ALG	Liassine Cadamuro (from (Switzerland) Servette Genève)
8	MF	FRA	Pierrick Valdivia (from (Belgium) Sint-Truidense VV)
9	FW	FRA	Clément Depres (loan return from La Berrichonne de Châteauroux)
10	MF	FRA	Romain Del Castillo (on loan from Olympique Lyonnais, previously on loan at FC Bourg-Péronnas)
14	FW	FRA	Antonin Bobichon (loan return from CA Bastia)
17	MF	GRE	Panagiotis Vlachodimos (from (Greece) Panathinaikos)
19	FW	TUR	Umut Bozok (from Marseille Consolat)
28	DF	FRA	Olivier Boscagli (on loan from OGC Nice)
30	GK	FRA	Baptiste Valette (from (Belgium) Excelsior Virton)
--	FW	FRA	Quentin Gregorio (from FC Sète)

Out:

No.	Pos.	Nation	Player
5	MF	TUN	Larry Azouni (to (Belgium) KV Kortrijk)
6	DF	FRA	Gaël Angoula (released)
11	FW	FRA	Slimane Sissoko (released)
12	MF	FRA	Florian Fabre (to FC Bastia-Borgo)
13	FW	CIV	Christian Kouakou (loan return to SM Caen)
16	GK	FRA	Gauthier Gallon (to US Orléans)
17	MF	COM	Nasser Chamed (released)
24	DF	CIV	Zié Diabaté (on loan to Chamois Niortais)
25	MF	MAR	Karim Aït-Fana (released)
27	DF	FRA	Anthony Marin (to AC Ajaccio)
28	MF	SEN	Ousmane Cissokho (to US Orléans)

=== Chamois Niortais F.C. ===
In:

No.	Pos.	Nation	Player
2	DF	FRA	Cyriaque Rivieyran (from Clermont Foot)
3	DF	CIV	Zié Diabaté (on loan from Nîmes Olympique)
11	MF	BRA	Pedro Henrique (from AS Béziers)
12	MF	FRA	Antoine Leautey (loan return from US Boulogne)
14	FW	FRA	Thibaut Vion (from FC Metz)
23	DF	FRA	Julien Dacosta (from Olympique de Marseille)
26	MF	FRA	Messaoud Bouardja (loan return from USL Dunkerque)
28	DF	BFA	Issouf Paro (from (South Africa) Santos)
--	MF	FRA	Banfa Diakité (from Balma SC)

Out:

No.	Pos.	Nation	Player
3	DF	BEN	David Kiki (to Stade Brestois)
6	MF	FRA	Junior Sambia (on loan to Montpellier HSC)
11	FW	FRA	Adrien Dabasse (on loan to Les Herbiers VF)
18	FW	FRA	Kevin Rocheteau (on loan to Les Herbiers VF)
20	MF	FRA	Zakaria Grich (on loan to USL Dunkerque)
23	DF	FRA	Tristan Lahaye (released)
25	MF	FRA	Quentin Daubin (on loan to FC Pau)
28	DF	TUN	Dylan Bronn (to (Belgium) KAA Gent)
—	DF	CGO	Fernand Mayembo (to Grenoble Foot 38)

=== US Orléans ===
In:

No.	Pos.	Nation	Player
3	DF	FRA	Cédric Cambon (from Havre AC)
4	DF	FRA	Gabriel Mutombo (on loan from Angers SCO, previously on loan at CA Bastia)
5	DF	FRA	Adrien Monfray (from Stade Lavallois)
6	MF	FRA	Maxime D'Arpino (on loan from Olympique Lyonnais)
7	FW	FRA	Gaëtan Perrin (on loan from Olympique Lyonnais)
12	MF	SEN	Ousmane Cissokho (from Nîmes Olympique)
15	MF	CIV	Issiaka Bamba (from FC Aubervilliers)
18	FW	CIV	Abraham Guié Guié (from (Cyprus) Apollon Limassol)
21	FW	TUN	Mohamed Ben Othman (from (Bulgaria) FC Lokomotiv Gorna Oryahovitsa)
23	DF	FRA	Steeve Furtado (from US Créteil)
26	FW	FRA	Hicham Benkaid (from RC Strasbourg)
28	MF	FRA	Denis Will Poha (on loan from Stade Rennais)
30	GK	FRA	Gauthier Gallon (from Nîmes Olympique)

Out:

No.	Pos.	Nation	Player
3	DF	COD	Joël Sami (to (Thailand) Ratchaburi FC)
4	MF	FRA	Mickael Barreto (to AJ Auxerre)
7	DF	FRA	Adrien Pagerie (to Les Herbiers VF)
9	FW	FRA	Romain Armand (to Gazélec Ajaccio)
11	FW	FRA	Kevin Dupuis (released)
13	FW	TUN	Khaled Ayari (released)
15	DF	COM	Benjaloud Youssouf (to AJ Auxerre)
16	GK	MLI	Oumar Sissoko (to Havre AC)
18	DF	CAF	Manassé Enza-Yamissi (released)
23	MF	FRA	Farid Beziouen (to FC Fleury 91)
26	DF	ALG	Essaid Belkalem (released)

=== Paris FC ===
In:

No.	Pos.	Nation	Player
3	DF	FRA	Thomas Delaine (from Arras)
6	MF	FRA	Martin Mimoun (from SC Bastia)
7	FW	FRA	Rayane Aabid (from AS Béziers)
8	MF	FRA	Redouane Kerrouche (from US Lusitanos)
9	FW	COD	Patrick Etshini (from Entente Sannois Saint-Gratien)
14	MF	FRA	Cyril Mandouki (from US Créteil)
17	DF	FRA	Samuel Yohou (from AS Béziers)
18	FW	FRA	Malik Tchokounté (from USL Dunkerque)
20	MF	ALG	Julien Lopez (from Marseille Consolat)
21	MF	LIE	Guillaume Khous (from JA Drancy)
23	DF	FRA	Souleymane Karamoko (from Entente Sannois Saint-Gratien)
24	MF	CIV	Edmond Akichi (from AS Béziers)
26	FW	CGO	Dylan Saint-Louis (from AS Saint-Étienne, previously on loan at Stade Lavallois)
27	MF	FRA	Valentin Lavigne (on loan from FC Lorient, previously on loan at Stade Brestois)
30	GK	GAB	Didier Ovono (from (Belgium) KV Oostende)

Out:

No.	Pos.	Nation	Player
7	FW	CMR	Rodrigue Bongongui (to Les Herbiers VF)
8	MF	FRA	Thomas Martin (to US Créteil)
9	FW	GUI	Demba Camara (to (Cyprus) Anorthosis)
12	FW	FRA	Jonathan Nanizayamo (to (South Korea) Gangwon FC)
13	DF	HAI	Jean-Jacques Pierre (to US Granville)
14	DF	FRA	Soualio Bakayoko
20	MF	GAB	Gaëtan Missi Mezu
21	MF	FRA	Eden Massouema (to Dijon FCO)
22	MF	FRA	Aristote Madiani (loan return to RC Lens)
23	DF	FRA	Romuald Marie (to Les Herbiers VF)
25	FW	FRA	Anthony Ribelin (loan return to Stade Rennais)
26	DF	FRA	Maka Mary (to SC Bastia)
28	MF	FRA	Jean-Baptiste Pierazzi (to (Cyprus) Alki Oroklini)
30	GK	FRA	Paul Charruau (loan return to SC Bastia)

=== US Quevilly-Rouen ===
In:

No.	Pos.	Nation	Player
4	DF	FRA	Jacques Salze (from Clermont Foot)
8	MF	FRA	Marvin Gakpa (from FC Lorient, previously on loan at AC Ajaccio)
9	FW	FRA	Mathieu Duhamel (from Havre AC)
11	FW	FRA	Ange-Freddy Plumain (from CS Sedan)
15	FW	FRA	Yannick Mamilonne (on loan from Amiens SC)
16	GK	FRA	Antoine Gounet (from (Netherlands) Achilles '29)
18	DF	FRA	Jules Mendy (from Marseille Consolat)
21	MF	CIV	Eric Tié Bi (from La Berrichonne de Châteauroux)
23	FW	FRA	Dorian Caddy (from OGC Nice, previously on loan at Clermont Foot)
24	DF	FRA	Jordan Lefort (on loan from Amiens SC)
25	DF	FRA	Jonathan Clauss (from US Avranches)
26	MF	FRA	Michel Ramon (from AS Béziers)
27	FW	TUN	Rafik Boujedra (from Gazélec Ajaccio)
29	MF	FRA	Aristote Madiani (from RC Lens, previously on loan at Paris FC)
30	GK	FRA	Joan Hartock (from Stade Brestois)

Out:

No.	Pos.	Nation	Player
2	DF	FRA	Cédric Jean-Etienne (released)
16	GK	SLE	Solomon Morris (to FC Dieppe)
21	FW	FRA	Mehdy Guezoui (to Valenciennes FC)
23	FW	FRA	Jérémy Bekhechi (to AS Lyon-Duchère)
25	MF	FRA	Karim Achahbar (loan return to EA Guingamp)
26	DF	FRA	Valentin Sanson (to FC Dieppe)
27	MF	SEN	Oumar Pouye (loan return to RC Strasbourg)
30	GK	FRA	Enzo Basilio (loan return to Dijon FCO)

=== Stade de Reims ===
In:

No.	Pos.	Nation	Player
2	DF	FRA	Hendrick Cakin (from FC Nantes reserve)
3	DF	MLI	Youssouf Koné (on loan from Lille OSC)
4	MF	FRA	Mathieu Cafaro (from Toulouse FC)
5	DF	MAR	Yunis Abdelhamid (from Dijon FCO)
7	MF	FRA	Xavier Chavalerin (from Red Star FC)
8	MF	FRA	Marvin Martin (from Lille OSC, previously on loan at Dijon FCO)
9	FW	GEQ	Anatole Ngamukol (from Red Star FC)
13	MF	FRA	Hassane Kamara (loan return from US Créteil)
19	FW	FRA	Jordan Siebatcheu (loan return from La Berrichonne de Châteauroux)
26	MF	FRA	Nolan Mbemba (from (Portugal) Vitória de Guimarães)

Out:

No.	Pos.	Nation	Player
4	MF	GEO	Jaba Kankava (released)
5	DF	FRA	Grégoire Amiot (to FC Bourg-Péronnas)
7	MF	CPV	Odair Fortes (released)
9	FW	SEN	Ibrahima Baldé (to (Romania) CFR Cluj)
15	DF	TUR	Atila Turan (to (Turkey) Kayserispor)
18	MF	GAB	Frédéric Bulot (released)
19	MF	FRA	Alexi Peuget (to Grenoble Foot 38)
21	MF	FRA	Hugo Rodriguez (retired)
25	DF	FRA	Anthony Weber (to Stade Brestois)
26	MF	COD	Omenuke Mfulu (to Red Star FC)
27	DF	MLI	Hamari Traoré (to Stade Rennais)
28	DF	FRA	Antoine Conte (to (Israel) Beitar Jerusalem, previously on loan)

=== FC Sochaux-Montbéliard ===
In:

No.	Pos.	Nation	Player
3	DF	FRA	Nicolas Senzemba (loan return from FC Pau)
5	DF	MAR	Zakarya Bergdich (from (Spain) Córdoba)
13	DF	GER	Mart Ristl (from (Germany) VfB Stuttgart II)
15	FW	FRA	Aldo Kalulu (on loan from Olympique Lyonnais, previously on loan at Stade Rennais)
20	MF	FRA	Axel Bakayoko (on loan from (Italy) Inter Milan)
21	FW	CIV	Yakou Meïté (on loan from (England) Reading FC)
24	MF	FRA	El Hadji Ba (from (Norway) Stabæk)
29	DF	GER	Patrick Kapp (from (Germany) TSG Hoffenheim II)
30	GK	GHA	Lawrence Ati-Zigi (from (Austria) RB Salzburg, previously on loan at (Austria) FC Liefering)

Out:

No.	Pos.	Nation	Player
1	GK	BEL	Olivier Werner (released)
5	MF	TUN	Mohamed Larbi (to (Turkey) Samsunspor)
8	MF	FRA	Johann Ramaré (to Valenciennes FC)
17	FW	FRA	Marcus Thuram (to EA Guingamp)
21	DF	FRA	Marco Ilaimaharitra (to (Belgium) Royal Charleroi SC)
23	FW	FRA	Franck Honorat (loan return to OGC Nice)
29	FW	SUI	Goran Karanović (loan return to Angers SCO)
30	DF	FRA	Christopher Dilo (released)
—	DF	BRA	Matheus Vivian (released)
—	DF	FRA	Ibrahima Konaté (to (Germany) RB Leipzig)

=== Tours FC ===
In:

No.	Pos.	Nation	Player
6	MF	ARG	Daniel Mancini (on loan from Girondins de Bordeaux)
8	MF	FRA	Gauthier Hein (on loan from FC Metz)
11	MF	FRA	Romain Bayard (from Stade Lavallois)
14	MF	SEN	Mayoro N'Doye (from RC Strasbourg)
15	FW	COD	John Tshibumbu (from Gazélec Ajaccio)
18	FW	COM	Djamel Bakar (from (Belgium) Royal Charleroi SC)
27	MF	ALG	Hameur Bouazza (from (Tunisia) ES Sahel)
28	MF	ALG	Florian Makhedjouf (from Red Star FC)
--	GK	CMR	Jules Goda (from AC Ajaccio)
--	DF	FRA	Aniss El Hriti (from SAS Épinal)

Out:

No.	Pos.	Nation	Player
4	MF	ALG	Ismael Bennacer (loan return to (England) Arsenal)
6	DF	MLI	Ousseynou Cissé (to (England) MK Dons)
8	MF	FRA	Mohamed Maouche (released)
11	MF	GAB	Denis Bouanga (loan return to FC Lorient)
16	GK	USA	Quentin Westberg (to AJ Auxerre)
20	FW	FRA	Geoffrey Malfleury (released)
21	FW	FRA	Toifilou Maoulida (released)
28	DF	COM	Faiz Selemani (loan return to FC Lorient)
30	GK	FRA	Bingourou Kamara (to RC Strasbourg)

=== Valenciennes FC ===
In:

No.	Pos.	Nation	Player
2	DF	FRA	Baptiste Aloé (from Olympique de Marseille, previously on loan)
5	MF	FRA	Johann Ramaré (from FC Sochaux-Montbéliard)
6	MF	BRA	Thiago Xavier (from ES Troyes AC)
14	FW	RSA	Lebo Mothiba (on loan from Lille OSC, previously on loan)
15	DF	FRA	Cherif Quenum (from US Avranches)
18	MF	FRA	Lossémy Karaboué (from (Greece) Levadiakos)
22	FW	FRA	Tony Mauricio (from US Boulogne)
23	FW	FRA	Lenny Nangis (from Lille OSC, previously on loan at SC Bastia)
26	DF	FRA	Jordan Pierre-Charles (from AC Ajaccio)
27	FW	FRA	Mehdy Guezoui (from US Quevilly-Rouen)
28	DF	FRA	Laurent Dos Santos (from RC Strasbourg)
--	MF	FRA	Jorris Romil (from Girondins de Bordeaux)

Out:

No.	Pos.	Nation	Player
2	DF	FRA	Baptiste Aloé (loan return to Olympique de Marseille)
5	MF	FRA	Adrien Tameze (to OGC Nice)
6	DF	FRA	Angelo Fulgini (to Angers SCO)
9	FW	FRA	Edouard Butin (to Stade Brestois)
15	DF	FRA	Moussa Niakhate (to FC Metz)
21	MF	HAI	Andy Faustin (to (Belgium) Zulte-Waregem)
22	DF	SEN	Saliou Ciss (to Angers SCO)
29	FW	CPV	Nuno da Costa (to RC Strasbourg)
—	FW	BFA	Abdoul Kaboré (to US Boulogne)

== See also ==
- 2017–18 Ligue 1
- 2017–18 Ligue 2
