= 2016–17 Coupe de la Ligue =

French League Cup

Tournament details
- Country: France
- Dates: 9 August 2016 – 1 April 2017
- Teams: 44

Final positions
- Champions: Paris Saint-Germain (7th title)
- Runners-up: Monaco

Tournament statistics
- Matches played: 43
- Goals scored: 117 (2.72 per match)
- Attendance: 531,724 (12,366 per match)
- Top goal scorer(s): Edinson Cavani; Gaëtan Laborde (4 goals each)

The 2016–17 Coupe de la Ligue was the 23rd French league cup competition. The competition was organized by the Ligue de Football Professionnel and was open to the 44 professional clubs in France that are managed by the organization.

Paris Saint-Germain were the three-time reigning champions, having defeated Lille 2–1 in the previous season's final, and they successfully defended their title, defeating Monaco 4–1 in the 2017 final.

== First round ==
First round matches were held over 1 day; 9 August 2016. The 12 winners secured places in the second round. All times in Central European Time.

9 August 2016	Reims (2)	2–5	Le Havre (2)	Reims
18:30	Kyei 11'; Siebatcheu 64'		Conte 48' (o.g.); Dembélé 51' (pen.), 54'; Jeanvier 61' (o.g.); Fontaine 66'	Stadium: Stade Auguste Delaune; Attendance: 6,133; Referee: Olivier Thaul

9 August 2016	Strasbourg (2)	1–0	Niort (2)	Strasbourg
18:30	Sacko 32'			Stadium: Stade de la Meinau; Attendance: 10,427; Referee: Alexandre Castro

9 August 2016	Brest (2)	0–0 (5–3 p)	Valenciennes (2)	Brest
18:30				Stadium: Stade Francis-Le Blé; Attendance: 3.427; Referee: Yohann Rouinsard
	Penalties
	Battocchio (penalty scored); Maupay (penalty scored); Castán (penalty scored); Coeff (penalty scored); Grougi (penalty scored)		(penalty scored) Fulgini; (penalty missed) Roudet; (penalty scored) Enza Yamissi; (penalty scored) Néry

9 August 2016	Lens (2)	3–0	Ajaccio (2)	Lens
18:30	Bostock 27'; Fortuné 49', 77'			Stadium: Stade Bollaert-Delelis; Attendance: 15,568; Referee: Aurélien Petit

9 August 2016	Paris FC (3)	1–1 (5–3 p)	Red Star (2)	Paris
18:30	Robail 15'		Missi Mezu 83' (o.g.)	Stadium: Stade Charléty; Attendance: 2,006; Referee: Wilfried Bien
	Penalties
	Gbessi (penalty scored); Marie (penalty scored); Pierazzi (penalty scored); Massouema (penalty scored); Camara (penalty scored)		(penalty scored) Chavalerin; (penalty scored) Makhedjouf; (penalty scored) Bouazza; (penalty missed) Keita

9 August 2016	Orléans (2)	1–0	Tours (2)	Orléans
20:00	Beziouen 45+1'			Stadium: Stade de la Source; Attendance: 3,389; Referee: Stéphane Jochem

9 August 2016	Laval (2)	1–0	Troyes (2)	Laval
20:00	Koné 58'			Stadium: Stade Francis Le Basser; Attendance: 3,251; Referee: William Lavis

9 August 2016	Nîmes (2)	1–1 (1–3 p)	Châteauroux (3)	Nîmes
20:00	Ripart 21'		das Neves 79'	Stadium: Stade des Costières; Attendance: 3,535; Referee: Floris Aubin
	Penalties
	Savanier (penalty scored); Chamed (penalty missed); Ripart (penalty missed); Alioui (penalty missed)		(penalty scored) Altama; (penalty missed) Chergui; (penalty scored) Sangante; (penalty scored) das Neves

9 August 2016	Sochaux (2)	0–0 (4–2 p)	Gazélec Ajaccio (2)	Montbéliard
20:00				Stadium: Stade Auguste Bonal; Attendance: 8,012; Referee: Sylvain Palhies
	Penalties
	Robinet (penalty scored); Fuchs (penalty scored); Martin (penalty scored); Sao (penalty scored)		(penalty scored) Ducourtioux; (penalty missed) M'Changama; (penalty missed) Poggi; (penalty scored) Cissé

9 August 2016	Clermont (2)	2–1	Amiens (2)	Clermont-Ferrand
20:00	Ajorque 8' (pen.); Salze 90+3'		Adénon 90'	Stadium: Stade Gabriel Montpied; Attendance: 1,508; Referee: Jérémy Stinat

9 August 2016	Auxerre (2)	2–2 (5–4 p)	Bourg-Péronnas (2)	Auxerre
20:00	Vincent 11'; Courtet 35'		Heinry 72'; Berthomier 80'	Stadium: Stade de l'Abbé-Deschamps; Attendance: 4,284; Referee: Thomas Léonard
	Penalties
	Courtet (penalty scored); Vincent (penalty scored); Fournier (penalty missed); Mathis (penalty scored); Boucher (penalty scored); Ba (penalty scored)		(penalty scored) Del Castillo; (penalty scored) Berthomier; (penalty scored) Bègue; (penalty scored) Damour; (penalty missed) Heinry; (penalty missed) Boussaha

Créteil (3)	bye
Note: Créteil (3) advanced to the second round after Évian forfeited as they did not participate in league play this season.

Note: The numbers in parentheses are the tier for the team during the 2016–17 season.

== Second round ==
The round featured the 12 winners of the first-round matches. The matches were held over 1 day; 23 August 2016. The 6 winners secured places in the third round. All games in Central European Time.

23 August 2016	Auxerre (2)	2–0	Strasbourg (2)	Auxerre
18:30	Courtet 24'; Dos Santos 90+2' (o.g.)			Stadium: Stade Abbé-Deschamps; Attendance: 3,830; Referee: Amaury Delerue

23 August 2016	Orléans (2)	0–0 (1–4 p)	Laval (2)	Orléans
18:30				Stadium: Stade de la Source; Attendance: 3,094; Referee: Romain Delpech
	Penalties
	Gomis (penalty scored); Beziouen (penalty missed); Bouby (penalty missed)		(penalty scored) Alla; (penalty scored) Monfray; (penalty scored) Afougou; (penalty scored) N'Diaye

23 August 2016	Sochaux (2)	2–0	Brest (2)	Montbéliard
18:30	Honorat 40'; Robinet 77' (pen.)			Stadium: Stade Bonal; Attendance: 7,519; Referee: Wilfried Bien

23 August 2016	Le Havre (2)	2–5	Châteauroux (3)	Le Havre
18:30	Gimbert 35'; Duhamel 83'		Mateta 15', 33', 52'; M'Boné 38'; Boukari 81'	Stadium: Stade Océane; Attendance: 4,970; Referee: Romain Lissorgue

23 August 2016	Lens (2)	0–0 (6–7 p)	Paris FC (3)	Lens
18:30				Stadium: Stade Bollaert-Delelis; Attendance: 15,182; Referee: Jérôme Brisard
	Penalties
	Autret (penalty scored); Sylla (penalty scored); Robert (penalty missed); Chouiar (penalty scored); Beghin (penalty scored); Milville (penalty scored); Ebosse (penalty scored); Chevalier (penalty missed)		(penalty scored) Marie; (penalty scored) Martin; (penalty scored) Pierre; (penalty missed) Massouema; (penalty scored) Camara; (penalty scored) Missi Mezu; (penalty scored) Bakayoko; (penalty scored) Pierazzi

23 August 2016	Clermont (2)	2–1	Créteil (3)	Clermont-Ferrand
18:30	Thiam 45'; Jobello 67'		Niakaté 90+2'	Stadium: Stade Gabriel Montpied; Attendance: 1,529; Referee: Florent Batta

Note: The numbers in parentheses are the tier for the team during the 2016–17 season.

== Third round ==
The Third Round, also known as the Round of 32, featured the 6 winners of the second round matches in addition to 14 Ligue 1 clubs who were not participating in the European competitions. The matches were played 25 and 26 October 2016. All games in Central European Time.

25 October 2016	Laval (2)	0–2	Montpellier (1)	Laval
18:45			Mounié 6'; Berigaud 48'	Stadium: Stade Francis Le Basser; Attendance: 6,330; Referee: Hakim Ben El Hadj

25 October 2016	Nantes (1)	2–1	Angers (1)	Nantes
21:00	Sala 28'; Thomasson 47'		Capelle 51'	Stadium: Stade de la Beaujoire; Attendance: 32,003; Referee: Tony Chapron

26 October 2016	Châteauroux (3)	0–2	Bordeaux (1)	Châteauroux
18:45			Kamano 40'; Ounas 84'	Stadium: Stade Gaston Petit; Attendance: 9,787; Referee: Stéphane Jochem

26 October 2016	Rennes (1)	3–2	Lorient (1)	Rennes
21:05	Pedro Henrique 16', 90+5'; Saïd 59'		Waris 87' (pen.); Lautoa 90+3'	Stadium: Roazhon Park; Attendance: 26,954; Referee: Clément Turpin

26 October 2016	Bastia (1)	1–1 (3–4 p)	Guingamp (1)	Bastia
21:05	Marange 45+2'		Privat 28'	Stadium: Stade Armand Cesari; Attendance: 6,029; Referee: Mikael Lesage
	Penalties
	Diallo (penalty scored); Danic (penalty scored); Bifouma (penalty missed); Bengtsson (penalty missed); Saint-Maximin (penalty scored)		(penalty scored) De Pauw; (penalty scored) Sankoh; (penalty missed) Livolant; (penalty scored) Mané; (penalty scored) Blas

26 October 2016	Nancy (1)	4–2	Caen (1)	Nancy
21:05	Puyo 8', 61'; Mandanne 15', 37'		Makengo 14', 50'	Stadium: Stade Marcel Picot; Attendance: 14,015; Referee: Frank Schneider

26 October 2016	Clermont (2)	1–2	Marseille (1)	Clermont-Ferrand
21:05	Centonze 52'		Machach 45'; Gomis 69'	Stadium: Stade Gabriel Montpied; Attendance: 10,480; Referee: François Letexier

26 October 2016	Dijon (1)	1–1 (4–5 p)	Sochaux (2)	Dijon
21:05	Bahamboula 12'		Karanović 15'	Stadium: Stade Gaston Gérard; Attendance: 7,453; Referee: Amaury Delerue
	Penalties
	Lees-Melou (penalty scored); Amalfitano (penalty scored); Bernard (penalty scored); Gastien (penalty scored); Diony (penalty missed)		(penalty scored) Tardieu; (penalty scored) Ruiz; (penalty scored) Ilaimaharitra; (penalty scored) Sao; (penalty scored) Thuram

26 October 2016	Toulouse (1)	1–0	Auxerre (2)	Toulouse
21:05	Jullien 53'			Stadium: Stadium Municipal; Attendance: 8,300; Referee: Sébastien Moreira

26 October 2016	Paris FC (3)	1–1 (6–7 p)	Metz (1)	Paris
21:05	Missi Mezu 27'		Nguette 65'	Stadium: Stade Charléty; Attendance: 3,321; Referee: Karim Abed
	Penalties
	Ech-Chergui (penalty scored); Marie (penalty missed); Gbessi (penalty scored); Pierazzi (penalty scored); Bakayoko (penalty scored); Bong (penalty scored); Missi Mezu (penalty scored); Nanizayamo (penalty missed)		(penalty scored) Cohade; (penalty scored) Milán; (penalty scored) Falette; (penalty scored) Nguette; (penalty missed) Erdinç; (penalty scored) Diallo; (penalty scored) Doukouré; (penalty scored) Balliu

Note: The numbers in parentheses are the tier for the team during the 2016–17 season.

== Round of 16 ==
The Fourth Round, also known as the Round of 16, featured the 10 winners of the third round matches in addition to 6 Ligue 1 clubs who are participating in the European competitions. The matches were played on 13 and 14 December 2016. All times are CET (UTC+1).

13 December 2016	Nantes (1)	3–1	Montpellier (1)	Nantes
18:45	Sala 18', 43'; Stępiński 62'	Report	Bérigaud 36'	Stadium: Stade de la Beaujoire; Attendance: 16,249; Referee: Ruddy Buquet

13 December 2016	Sochaux (2)	1–1 (4–3 p)	Marseille (1)	Montbéliard
21:00	Sao 36'	Report	Sarr 22'	Stadium: Stade Auguste Bonal; Attendance: 18,248; Referee: Tony Chapron
	Penalties
	Tardieu (penalty missed); Robinet (penalty scored); Ilaimaharitra (penalty scored); Sao (penalty scored); Karanović (penalty scored)		(penalty scored) Thauvin; (penalty scored) Lopez; (penalty scored) Sarr; (penalty missed) Dória; (penalty missed) Leya

14 December 2016	Bordeaux (1)	3–2	Nice (1)	Bordeaux
18:45	Plašil 14'; Laborde 22', 55'	Report	Pléa 42'; Balotelli 83' (pen.)	Stadium: Matmut Atlantique; Attendance: 15,049; Referee: François Letexier

14 December 2016	Monaco (1)	7–0	Rennes (1)	Monaco
21:05	Mbappé 11', 21', 62'; Boschilia 35', 79'; Jean 83'; Cavaré 84' (o.g.)	Report		Stadium: Stade Louis II; Attendance: 5,539; Referee: Frank Schneider

14 December 2016	Metz (1)	1–1 (11–10 p)	Toulouse (1)	Metz
21:05	Mollet 11'	Report	Braithwaite 28' (pen.)	Stadium: Stade Saint-Symphorien; Attendance: 5,876; Referee: Benoît Millot
	Penalties
	Milán (penalty scored); Phillips (penalty scored); Falette (penalty scored); Balliu (penalty scored); Cohade (penalty scored); Nguette (penalty scored); Mandjeck (penalty scored); Diallo (penalty scored); Signorino (penalty scored); Sarr (penalty scored); Oberhauser (penalty scored)		(penalty scored) Toivonen; (penalty scored) Sirieix; (penalty scored) Sylla; (penalty scored) Bodiger; (penalty scored) Braithwaite; (penalty scored) Somalia; (penalty scored) Jullien; (penalty scored) Michelin; (penalty scored) Yago; (penalty scored) Ninkov; (penalty missed) Goicoechea

14 December 2016	Lyon (1)	2–2 (3–4 p)	Guingamp (1)	Décines-Charpieu
21:05	Valbuena 43'; Lacazette 75'	Report	Blas 20'; De Pauw 70'	Stadium: Parc Olympique Lyonnais; Attendance: 17,002; Referee: Benoît Bastien
	Penalties
	Fekir (penalty missed); Mammana (penalty scored); Jallet (penalty scored); Valbuena (penalty missed); Lacazette (penalty scored)		(penalty scored) Giresse; (penalty missed) De Pauw; (penalty scored) Angoua; (penalty scored) Diabaté; (penalty scored) Kerbrat

14 December 2016	Saint-Étienne (1)	0–1	Nancy (1)	Saint-Étienne
21:05		Report	Dalé 18'	Stadium: Stade Geoffroy-Guichard; Attendance: 13,372; Referee: Fredy Fautrel

14 December 2016	Paris Saint-Germain (1)	3–1	Lille (1)	Paris
21:05	Lucas 43' (pen.), 57'; Jesé 69'	Report	Baša 89'	Stadium: Parc des Princes; Attendance: 45,183; Referee: Mikael Lesage

Note: The numbers in parentheses are the tier for the team during the 2016–17 season.

== Quarter-finals ==
The fifth round, also known as the quarter-finals, features the 8 winners of the fourth round matches. The matches were played on 10 and 11 January 2017. All times are CET (UTC+1).

10 January 2017	Nantes (1)	0–2	Nancy (1)	Nantes
18:30		Report	Dalé 31'; Cuffaut 45+3'	Stadium: Stade de la Beaujoire; Attendance: 10,349; Referee: Clément Turpin

10 January 2017	Sochaux (2)	1–1 (3–4 p)	Monaco (1)	Montbéliard
21:00	Andriatsima 16'	Report	Moutinho 83'	Stadium: Stade Auguste Bonal; Attendance: 15,362; Referee: Mikael Lesage
	Penalties
	Andriatsima (penalty scored); Robinet (penalty scored); Ilaimaharitra (penalty missed); Ramaré (penalty scored); Sao (penalty missed)		(penalty scored) Falcao; (penalty scored) Moutinho; (penalty scored) Glik; (penalty scored) Sidibé; (penalty missed) Carrillo

11 January 2017	Bordeaux (1)	3–2	Guingamp (1)	Bordeaux
18:45	Kamano 16'; Laborde 36', 65'	Report	Privat 12'; Benezet 88'	Stadium: Matmut Atlantique; Attendance: 8,900; Referee: Ruddy Buquet

11 January 2017	Paris Saint-Germain (1)	2–0	Metz (1)	Paris
21:05	Thiago Silva 27', 72'	Report		Stadium: Parc des Princes; Attendance: 43,857; Referee: Amaury Delerue

Note: The numbers in parentheses are the tier for the team during the 2016–17 season.

== Semi-finals ==
The Sixth Round, also known as the semi-finals, featured the 4 winners of the quarter-finals matches. The matches were played on 24 and 25 January 2017. All times are CET (UTC+1).

24 January 2017	Bordeaux (1)	1–4	Paris Saint-Germain (1)	Bordeaux
21:00	Rolán 32'	Report	Di María 19', 81'; Cavani 60', 74'	Stadium: Matmut Atlantique; Attendance: 28,862; Referee: Clément Turpin

25 January 2017	Monaco (1)	1–0	Nancy (1)	Monaco
21:00	Falcao 45+2'	Report		Stadium: Stade Louis II; Attendance: 7,699; Referee: Ruddy Buquet

Note: The numbers in parentheses are the tier for the team during the 2016–17 season.

== Final ==
The final was played on 1 April 2017. For the first time since 1998, the final was not played at the Stade de France. PSG won the final beating Monaco 4–1 to claim their 7th League Cup.

1 April 2017
21:00 CEST

Monaco	1–4	Paris Saint-Germain
Lemar 27'	Report	Draxler 4'; Di María 44'; Cavani 54', 90'

Parc Olympique Lyonnais, Décines-Charpieu
Attendance: 57,841
Referee: Frank Schneider

== Top goalscorers ==
Rank	Player	Club	Goals
1	(Uruguay) Edinson Cavani	Paris Saint-Germain	4
1	(France) Gaëtan Laborde	Bordeaux	4
3	(Argentina) Ángel Di María	Paris Saint-Germain	3
3	(France) Jean-Philippe Mateta	Châteauroux	3
3	(France) Kylian Mbappé	Monaco	3
3	(Argentina) Emiliano Sala	Nantes	3
