= Salze =

Salze may refer to:

- Salze (Bega), a river of North Rhine-Westphalia, Germany, tributary of the Bega
- Jacques Salze (born 1987), French footballer
