= Lacazette =

Lacazette is a surname. Notable people with the surname include:

- Alexandre Lacazette (born 1991), French footballer
- Romuald Lacazette (born 1994), French footballer
