= Baba Traoré =

French footballer (born 1992)

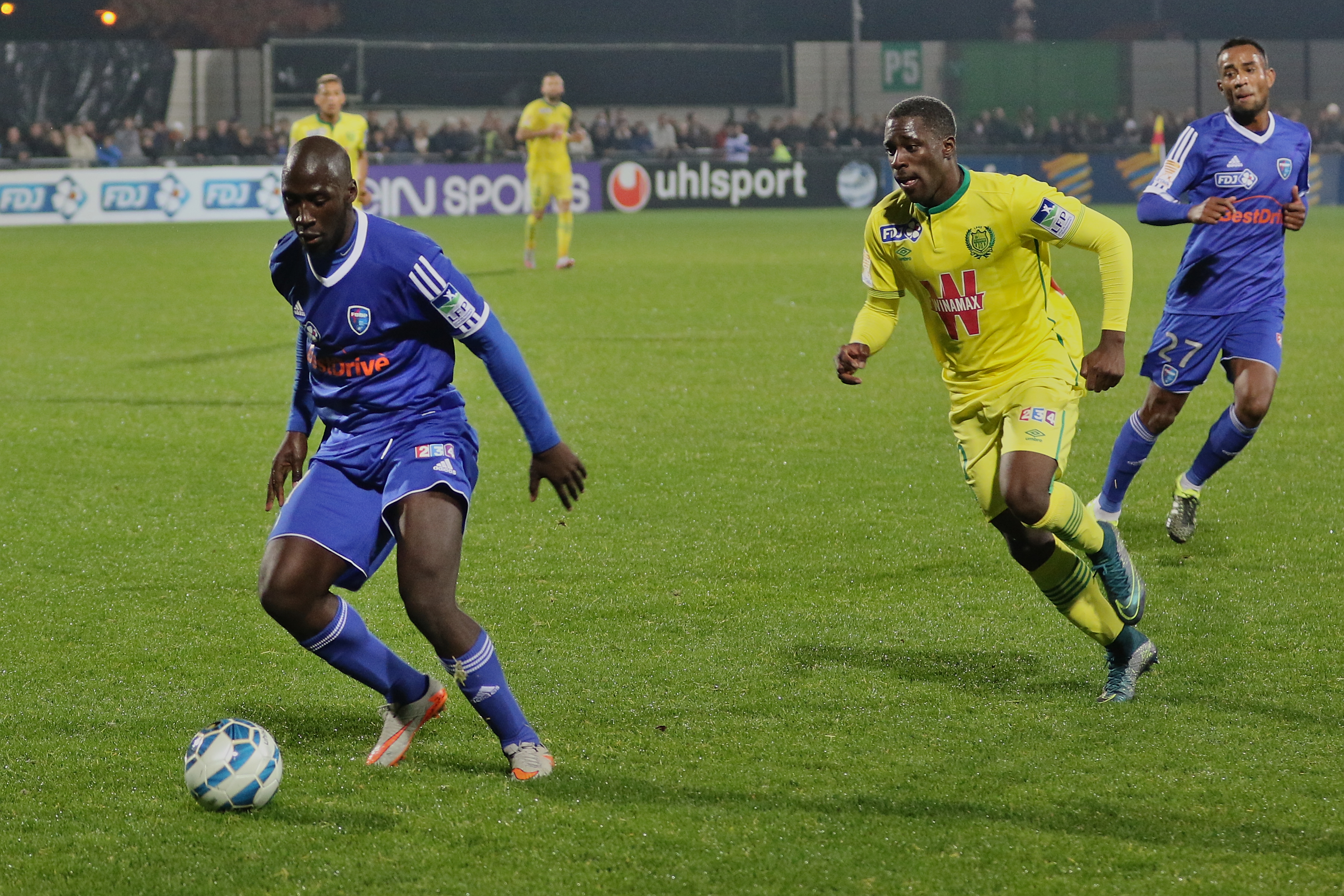
- Baba Traore and Jules Iloki

Personal information
- Date of birth: 13 October 1992 (age 34)
- Place of birth: Pierrefitte-sur-Seine, France
- Height: 1.78 m (5 ft 10 in)
- Position: Left-back

Team information
- Current team: Hyères

Youth career
- Pierrefitte FC

Senior career*
Years	Team	Apps	(Gls)
2012–2013	Châteauroux B	21	(0)
2013–2015	Poiré-sur-Vie B	13	(1)
2013–2015	Poiré-sur-Vie	31	(1)
2015–2016	Bourg-en-Bresse	25	(1)
2016–2017	Auxerre	21	(0)
2017	Auxerre B	4	(0)
2017–2018	Le Havre	13	(0)
2017–2020	Le Havre B	22	(1)
2019	→ Brest (loan)	3	(0)
2019	→ Brest B (loan)	2	(0)
2021–	Hyères	8	(1)
- * Club domestic league appearances and goals as of 21:22, 24 April 2022 (UTC)

Baba Traoré (born 13 October 1992) is a French professional footballer who plays as a left back for Championnat National 1 club Hyères.

== Career ==
In January 2019, Traoré was loaned to Brest from Le Havre until the end of the season.

== Personal life ==
As a youth player, Baba Traoré played along his brother Cheick Traoré, who is also a professional footballer, in his native Pierrefitte-sur-Seine. Traoré holds French and Malian nationalities. He was selected with Malian U21 team for the Toulon tournament in 2016.
