= Moustapha Kaboré =

Burkinabé footballer

Personal information
- Full name: Abdoul Moustapha Kaboré
- Date of birth: 1 January 1996 (age 30)
- Place of birth: Ouagadougou, Burkina Faso
- Height: 1.87 m (6 ft 2 in)
- Position: Forward

Team information
- Current team: Le Touquet

Senior career*
Years	Team	Apps	(Gls)
2015–2018	Metz B	8	(4)
2015–2018	Metz	14	(1)
2016–2017	→ Sedan (loan)	28	(8)
2017–2018	→ L'Entente SSG (loan)	20	(2)
2018	→ Sedan (loan)	9	(1)
2019	Limoges	11	(3)
2019	Croix	8	(1)
2020	Muret	5	(0)
2020–2021	Tirsense	5	(0)
2021	Cinfães	4	(1)
2021–	Le Touquet	16	(3)

International career^{‡}
2017–	Burkina Faso	1	(0)
- * Club domestic league appearances and goals as of 1 July 2022 ‡ National team caps and goals as of 4 June 2017

Abdoul Moustapha Kaboré (born 1 January 1996) is a Burkinabé professional footballer who plays as a forward for Le Touquet.

== Club career ==
In January 2019, he moved to Limoges. He then moved to Iris Club de Croix six months later, before joining Championnat National 3 club AS Muret in January 2020.

== International career ==
Kaboré made his debut for the Burkina Faso national football team in a 3–0 friendly loss to Chile on 2 June 2017.

== Personal life ==
Moustapha is the cousin of another Burkinabé international footballer Charles Kaboré.
