= Kévin das Neves =

French footballer (born 1986)

Personal information
- Date of birth: 8 May 1986 (age 40)
- Place of birth: Clermont-Ferrand, France
- Height: 1.83 m (6 ft 0 in)
- Position: Defender

Youth career
- 2003–2005: Nantes

Senior career*
Years	Team	Apps	(Gls)
2005–2009	Nantes	21	(0)
2009–2010	Boulogne	8	(0)
2011–2015	Le Poiré-sur-Vie	99	(4)
2015–2018	Châteauroux	43	(0)
Total		171	(4)

International career
2007	France U21	1	(0)
- * Club domestic league appearances and goals

Kévin das Neves (born 8 May 1986) is a French former professional footballer who played as a defender. He was capped once for the France under-21 squad. Das Neves is of Portuguese descent through his mother's side and holds Portuguese nationality.

== Career statistics ==
Appearances and goals by club, season and competition
Club	Division	Season	League		Coupe de France		Coupe de la Ligue		Total	
Club	Division	Season	Apps	Goals	App3	Goals	Apps	Goals	Apps	Goals
Nantes	2005–06	Ligue 1	2	0	0	0	0	0	2	0
Nantes	2006–07	Ligue 1	9	0	2	0	0	0	11	0
Nantes	2007–08	Ligue 2	7	0	2	1	0	0	9	1
Nantes	2008–09	Ligue 1	3	0	0	0	0	0	3	0
Nantes	Total		21	0	4	1	0	0	25	1
Boulogne	2009–10	Ligue 1	8	0	0	0	1	0	9	0
Le Poiré-sur-Vie	2011–12	National	24	2	2	1	0	0	26	3
Le Poiré-sur-Vie	2012–13	National	31	2	4	0	0	0	35	2
Le Poiré-sur-Vie	2013–14	National	23	0	0	0	0	0	23	0
Le Poiré-sur-Vie	2014–15	National	21	0	7	2	0	0	28	2
Le Poiré-sur-Vie	Total		99	4	13	3	0	0	112	7
Châteauroux	2015–16	National	27	0	0	0	0	0	27	0
Châteauroux	2016–17	National	8	0	0	0	2	1	10	0
Châteauroux	2017–18	Ligue 2	8	0	2	0	0	0	10	0
Châteauroux	Total		43	0	2	0	2	1	47	1
Career total			171	4	19	4	3	1	193	9
