= Exaucé Ngassaki =

Congolese footballer (born 1997)

Personal information
- Full name: Exaucé Ngassaki Ndongo
- Date of birth: 30 January 1997 (age 29)
- Place of birth: Brazzaville, Republic of the Congo
- Height: 1.80 m (5 ft 11 in)
- Position: Forward

Team information
- Current team: Saint-Colomban Locminé
- Number: 24

Youth career
- Djiri Academy Brazzaville
- 2015–2016: Caen

Senior career*
Years	Team	Apps	(Gls)
2016–2017	Caen II	31	(6)
2017	Caen	1	(0)
2017–2018	Brest II	23	(9)
2017–2018	Brest	0	(0)
2018–2019	Stade Plabennec	23	(6)
2019–2020	Saint-Colomban Locminé	16	(10)
2020–2021	Chamalières	9	(2)
2021–2023	Trélissac	42	(5)
2023–2024	Blois	38	(14)
2025	Fréjus Saint-Raphaël	9	(0)
2025–	Saint-Colomban Locminé	9	(4)
- * Club domestic league appearances and goals as of 4 December 2025

Exaucé Ngassaki Ndongo (born 30 January 1997) is a Congolese professional footballer who plays as a forward for French Championnat National 1 club Saint-Colomban Locminé.

== Club career ==
Ngassaki made his professional debut for Montpellier in a 1–0 Ligue 1 win over Nancy on 21 February 2017.

In July 2019, Ngassaki joined Championnat National 3 Saint-Colomban Locminé.

== International career ==
Ngassaki was first called up to the Republic of the Congo national team for a friendly match against Mauritania on 28 March 2017.
