= Dorian Caddy =

French footballer (born 1995)

Personal information
- Date of birth: 20 March 1995 (age 31)
- Place of birth: Cagnes-sur-Mer, France
- Height: 1.87 m (6 ft 2 in)
- Position: Striker

Youth career
- 2001–2005: Stade Laurentin
- 2005–2016: Nice

Senior career*
Years	Team	Apps	(Gls)
2016–2017	Nice B	67	(21)
2016–2017	Nice	7	(0)
2016–2017	→ Clermont (loan)	15	(4)
2017	→ Clermont B (loan)	2	(0)
2017–2018	Quevilly-Rouen	20	(1)
2017–2018	Quevilly-Rouen B	10	(6)
2018–2020	Rodez	15	(5)
2019–2020	Rodez B	13	(8)
2020–2021	Laval	14	(0)
2021–2022	Martigues	23	(3)

International career
2011	France U16	5	(0)
- * Club domestic league appearances and goals as of 28 May 2022

Dorian Caddy (born 20 March 1995) is a French professional footballer who plays as a striker.

== Club career ==
Caddy is a youth exponent from Nice. He made his Ligue 1 debut on 23 January 2016 against Lorient. He started in the first eleven before he was substituted for Rémi Walter after 62 minutes in a 2–1 home win.

In January 2016, Caddy was promoted to the Nice first team due to good performances with the CFA team.

In November 2016, Caddy joined Ligue 2 club Clermont on loan for the remainder of the 2016–17 season. The following season he joined newly-promoted Quevilly-Rouen.

In the summer of 2018 Caddy signed for Rodez in Championnat National, and helped the club gain promotion to Ligue 2. At the end of that contract he signed for Laval.

== International career ==
Born in metropolitan France, Caddy is of Martiniquais descent. He is a youth international for France.

== Honours ==
Martigues

- Championnat National 2: 2021–22
