= Anthony Marin =

French footballer (born 1989)

Personal information
- Full name: Anthony Marin
- Date of birth: 21 September 1989 (age 37)
- Place of birth: Marseille, France
- Height: 1.87 m (6 ft 2 in)
- Position: Defender

Team information
- Current team: Marseille Endoume

Senior career*
| Years | Team | Apps | (Gls) |
| 2012–2013 | Fréjus Saint-Raphaël | 5 | (0) |
| 2013–2014 | Le Pontet | 20 | (1) |
| 2014–2017 | Nîmes | 46 | (4) |
| 2017–2019 | Ajaccio | 8 | (0) |
| 2019– | Marseille Endoume | 17 | (1) |
- * Club domestic league appearances and goals as of 17:18, 19 September 2019 (UTC)

Anthony Marin (born 21 September 1989) is a French footballer who plays for US Marseille Endoume as a defender.

He has previously played for Fréjus Saint-Raphaël, Le Pontet, Ajaccio and Nîmes.
