= Yannick Mamilonne =

Guadeloupean footballer (born 1992)

Personal information
- Date of birth: 9 February 1992 (age 34)
- Place of birth: Saint-Claude, Guadeloupe
- Height: 1.90 m (6 ft 3 in)
- Position: Forward

Senior career*
Years	Team	Apps	(Gls)
2015–2016	Poissy	27	(18)
2016–2019	Amiens B	6	(1)
2016–2019	Amiens	14	(2)
2017–2018	→ Quevilly-Rouen (loan)	21	(5)
2018–2019	→ Paris FC (loan)	15	(2)
2019–2021	Chambly	9	(0)
2021	C'Chartres	0	(0)
- * Club domestic league appearances and goals as of 24 November 2021

Yannick Mamilonne (born 9 February 1992) is a Guadeloupean professional footballer who plays as a forward.
