= Mayoro N'Doye =

Senegalese footballer

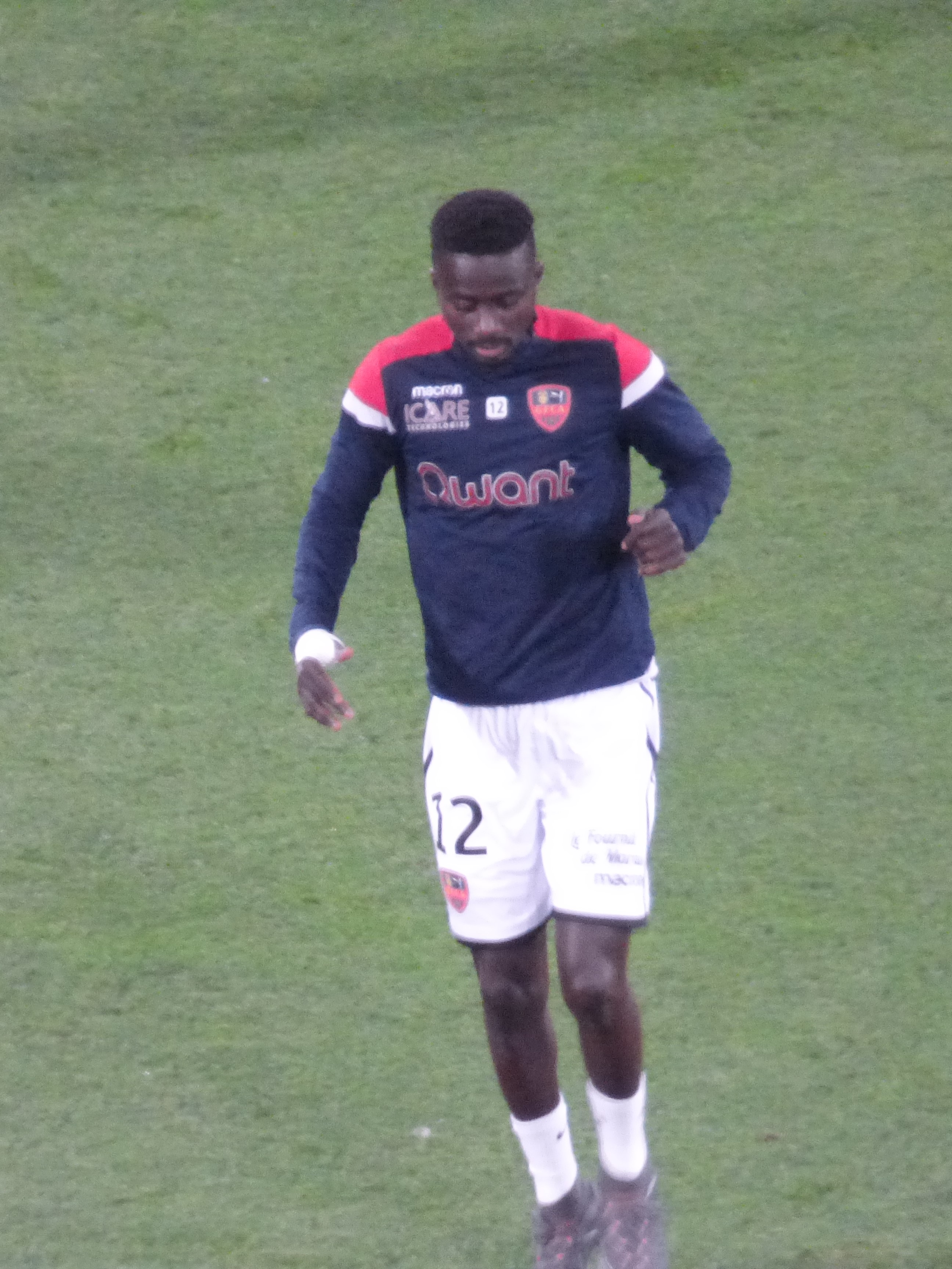
- N'Doye in 2018

Personal information
- Full name: Baye Mayoro N'Doye
- Date of birth: 18 December 1991 (age 34)
- Place of birth: Mbao, Senegal
- Height: 1.76 m (5 ft 9 in)
- Position: Central midfielder

Team information
- Current team: Bourges Foot 18

Senior career*
| Years | Team | Apps | (Gls) |
| 2011–2014 | Metz | 50 | (1) |
| 2014–2017 | Strasbourg | 73 | (4) |
| 2017–2018 | Tours | 28 | (1) |
| 2018–2020 | Gazélec Ajaccio | 54 | (0) |
| 2020–2022 | Red Star | 56 | (3) |
| 2022–2023 | Nancy | 23 | (0) |
| 2023– | Bourges Foot 18 | 5 | (0) |
- * Club domestic league appearances and goals as of 2 December 2023

Mayoro N'Doye (born 18 December 1991) is a Senegalese professional footballer who plays as a central midfielder for French Championnat National 1 club Bourges Foot 18.

== Club career ==
On 23 June 2022, N'Doye signed with Nancy in the French third tier.
