= Rafik Boujedra =

Footballer (born 1993)

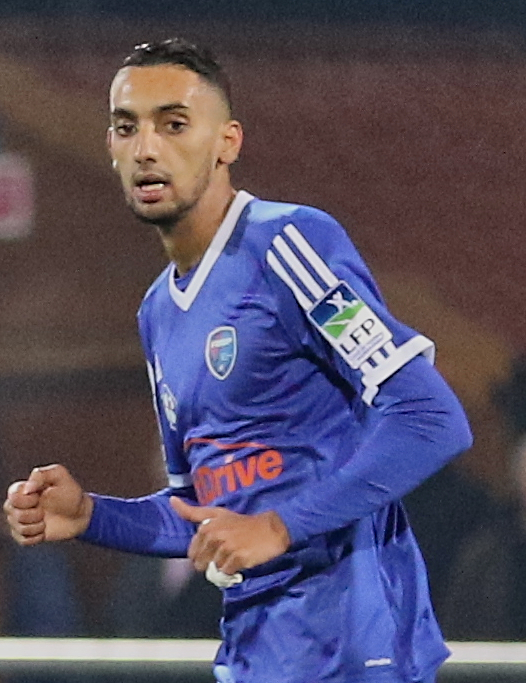
- Boujedra in 2015 with Bourg-en-Bresse

Personal information
- Date of birth: 27 July 1993 (age 33)
- Place of birth: Tournon-sur-Rhône, France
- Height: 1.77 m (5 ft 10 in)
- Position: Attacking midfielder

Team information
- Current team: Valence
- Number: 10

Youth career
- Valence

Senior career*
Years	Team	Apps	(Gls)
2011–2013	Valence	33	(4)
2013–2015	Gazélec Ajaccio	51	(2)
2015–2016	Bourg-en-Bresse (Note: In 2015, FC Bourg-Péronnas was renamed to Football Bourg-en-Bresse Péronnas 01.)	31	(2)
2016–2017	Gazélec Ajaccio	16	(0)
2017	Quevilly-Rouen B	2	(1)
2017–2018	Quevilly-Rouen	23	(0)
2018–2020	Bourg-en-Bresse	46	(3)
2020–2022	Le Puy	14	(0)
2022–	Valence	22	(0)

International career
2013	Tunisia U23	1	(0)
- * Club domestic league appearances and goals as of 1 July 2024 (UTC)

Rafik Boujedra (born 27 July 1993) is a professional footballer who plays as an attacking midfielder for Valence. Born in France, he is a former Tunisia youth international.

== Early life ==
Boujedra was born in Tournon-sur-Rhône, France, to a Tunisian mother. He acquired French nationality on 21 December 2001, through the collective effect of his mother's naturalization.

== Club career ==
After making his debut in the French lower divisions with his hometown club Valence, Boujedra joined Gazélec Ajaccio in 2013, while the club was in the third division. He made his full professional debut a year later, setting-up the second goal in a 2–0 Ligue 2 victory over Valenciennes.

== International career ==
Boujedra was called up to the Tunisia U23 national team for a friendly against Qatar in 2013.

== Honours ==
Le Puy

- Championnat National 2: 2021–22
