= Valentin Lavigne =

French footballer (born 1994)

Personal information
- Date of birth: 4 June 1994 (age 32)
- Place of birth: Toulon, France
- Height: 1.71 m (5 ft 7 in)
- Position: Right midfielder

Team information
- Current team: Fleury
- Number: 17

Youth career
- 2001–2014: Lorient

Senior career*
Years	Team	Apps	(Gls)
2014–2018	Lorient	21	(3)
2016	→ Laval (loan)	8	(0)
2016	→ Brest (loan)	6	(0)
2017–2018	→ Paris FC (loan)	17	(0)
2018–2020	Concarneau	34	(3)
2020–2022	Stade Briochin	44	(11)
2022–	Fleury	94	(13)

International career
2013	France U20	2	(0)
- * Club domestic league appearances and goals as of 23 June 2026

Valentin Lavigne (born 4 June 1994) is a French footballer who plays as a right midfielder for Ligue 3 club Fleury.

== Early life ==
Lavigne was born in Toulon, on the French Riviera. He moved to Lorient, Britanny, at the age of 3, when his father was appointed navigator at the Lann-Bihoué naval air station. He is a youth exponent from FC Lorient where he started playing football at the age of 6.

== Club career ==
He made his Ligue 1 debut on 10 August 2014 against AS Monaco, replacing Yann Jouffre after 81 minutes and scoring the winning goal six minutes later. Lorient won 2–1, their first ever away win at Monaco. In January 2016, Lavigne joined Ligue 2 side Stade Lavallois on loan for the remainder of the 2015–16 season. He went on to play eight league matches for the club. For the 2016–2017 season, he was again loaned out, this time to Brest. He was loaned out again for the 2017–18 season, to Paris FC.

In September 2018 Lavigne departed from Lorient and signed for Championnat National club US Concarneau.

In July 2020, Lavigne signed a one-year contract, with the option of a one-year extension, with newly promoted Championnat national club Stade Briochin.

In June 2022, Lavigne moved to Fleury in the fourth tier.

== Career statistics ==
As of 18 December 2020

Club	Division	Season	League		Cup		League Cup		Total	
Club	Division	Season	Apps	Goals	Apps	Goals	Apps	Goals	Apps	Goals
Lorient B	CFA	2011–12	5	0	—				5	0
Lorient B	CFA	2012–13	18	3	—				18	3
Lorient B	CFA 2	2013–14	24	7	—				24	7
Lorient B	CFA	2014–15	0	0	—				0	0
Lorient B	CFA	2015–16	8	1	—				8	1
Lorient B	Total		55	11	0	0	0	0	55	11
Lorient	Ligue 1	2014–15	15	3	0	0	1	1	16	4
Lorient	Ligue 1	2015–16	6	0	1	0	2	0	9	0
Lorient	Total		21	3	1	0	3	1	25	4
Laval (loan)	Ligue 2	2015–16	8	0	0	0	0	0	8	0
Brest (loan)	Ligue 2	2016–17	22	3	1	0	1	0	24	3
Paris FC (loan)	Ligue 2	2017–18	17	0	1	2	0	0	18	2
Paris FC B (loan)	National 3	2017–18	4	3	—				4	3
Concarneau	National	2018–19	16	0	1	1	—		17	1
Concarneau	National	2019–20	18	3	1	0	—		19	3
Concarneau	Total		34	3	2	1	0	0	36	4
Stade Briochin	National	2020–21	5	1	0	0	—		5	1
Career totals			166	24	5	3	4	1	175	28
