= Chérif Quenum =

French footballer (born 1993)

Personal information
- Full name: Kouame Chérif Quenum
- Date of birth: 5 June 1993 (age 33)
- Place of birth: Orléans, France
- Height: 1.82 m (6 ft 0 in)
- Position: Fullback

Youth career
- 2004–2006: Paris FC
- 2006–2007: Vinennois C.O.
- 2007–2009: CFFP
- 2009–2010: Beauvais
- 2010–2011: US Créteil
- 2011–2015: Orléans

Senior career*
| Years | Team | Apps | (Gls) |
| 2015–2016 | Tarbes | 16 | (0) |
| 2016–2017 | US Avranches II | 15 | (0) |
| 2017 | US Avranches | 10 | (0) |
| 2017–2020 | Valenciennes | 1 | (0) |
| 2019 | → Stade Bordelais (loan) | 12 | (0) |
| 2020–2021 | Bourges 18 | 3 | (0) |
- * Club domestic league appearances and goals as of 30 September 2020

Kouame Chérif Quenum (born 5 June 1993) is a French professional footballer who plays as a fullback.

== Professional career ==
After a steady progression in the lower leagues of France, Quenum signed for Valenciennes FC in Ligue 2 in June 2017. He made his professional debut for Valenciennes in a 4–3 Ligue 2 win over US Orléans on 29 September 2017. In January 2019, he was loaned to Stade Bordelais until the end of the season.

== Personal life ==
Quenum is of Ivorian descent.
