= Thiago Xavier =

Thiago Xavier is a masculine Brazilian given name. Notable people with the name include:

- Thiago Xavier Rodrigues Corrêa, (born 1983) Brazilian footballer
- Thiago Xavier Rosa, (born 1984) Brazilian footballer
