= Éric Tié Bi =

Ivorian footballer (born 1990)

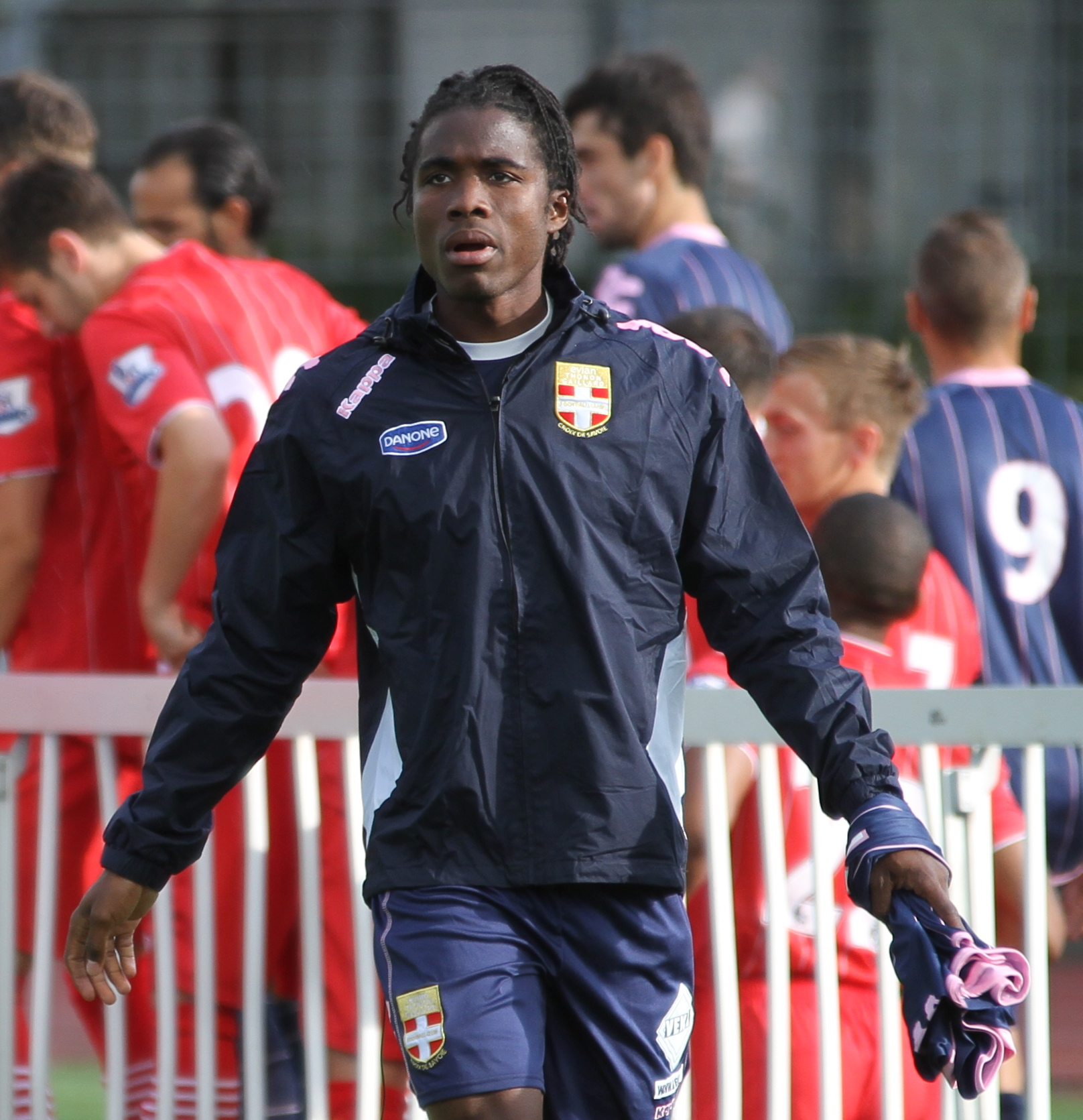

Personal information
- Full name: Éric Tié Bi
- Date of birth: 20 July 1990 (age 36)
- Place of birth: Bédiala, Ivory Coast
- Height: 1.80 m (5 ft 11 in)
- Position: Defensive midfielder

Team information
- Current team: Thonon Évian

Youth career
- 2006–2010: Lyon

Senior career*
| Years | Team | Apps | (Gls) |
| 2010–2014 | Évian | 86 | (0) |
| 2014–2015 | Asteras Tripolis | 12 | (0) |
| 2015–2017 | Brest | 28 | (0) |
| 2017 | Châteauroux | 14 | (0) |
| 2017–2019 | US Quevilly | 25 | (0) |
| 2018–2019 | US Quevilly B | ? | (?) |
| 2020– | Thonon Évian | 2 | (0) |
- * Club domestic league appearances and goals as of 14:32, 14 July 2020 (UTC)

Éric Tié Bi (born 20 July 1990) is an Ivorian professional footballer who plays for French club Thonon Évian as a defensive midfielder.

== Career ==
Tié Bi is a former graduate of the Olympique Lyonnais Reserves and Academy and began his career at the club. He amassed over 50 appearances with the club's Championnat de France amateur team, winning two reserve titles, before departing the club for Évian on a free transfer in May 2010.

Tié Bi made his professional debut on 30 July 2010 in a Coupe de la Ligue match against Strasbourg. He appeared as a substitute in the match, as Évian won the match 5–4 on penalties. He made his league debut a week later in a 2–0 victory over Metz.
