= Stephen Milosavljevic =

French footballer (born 1993)

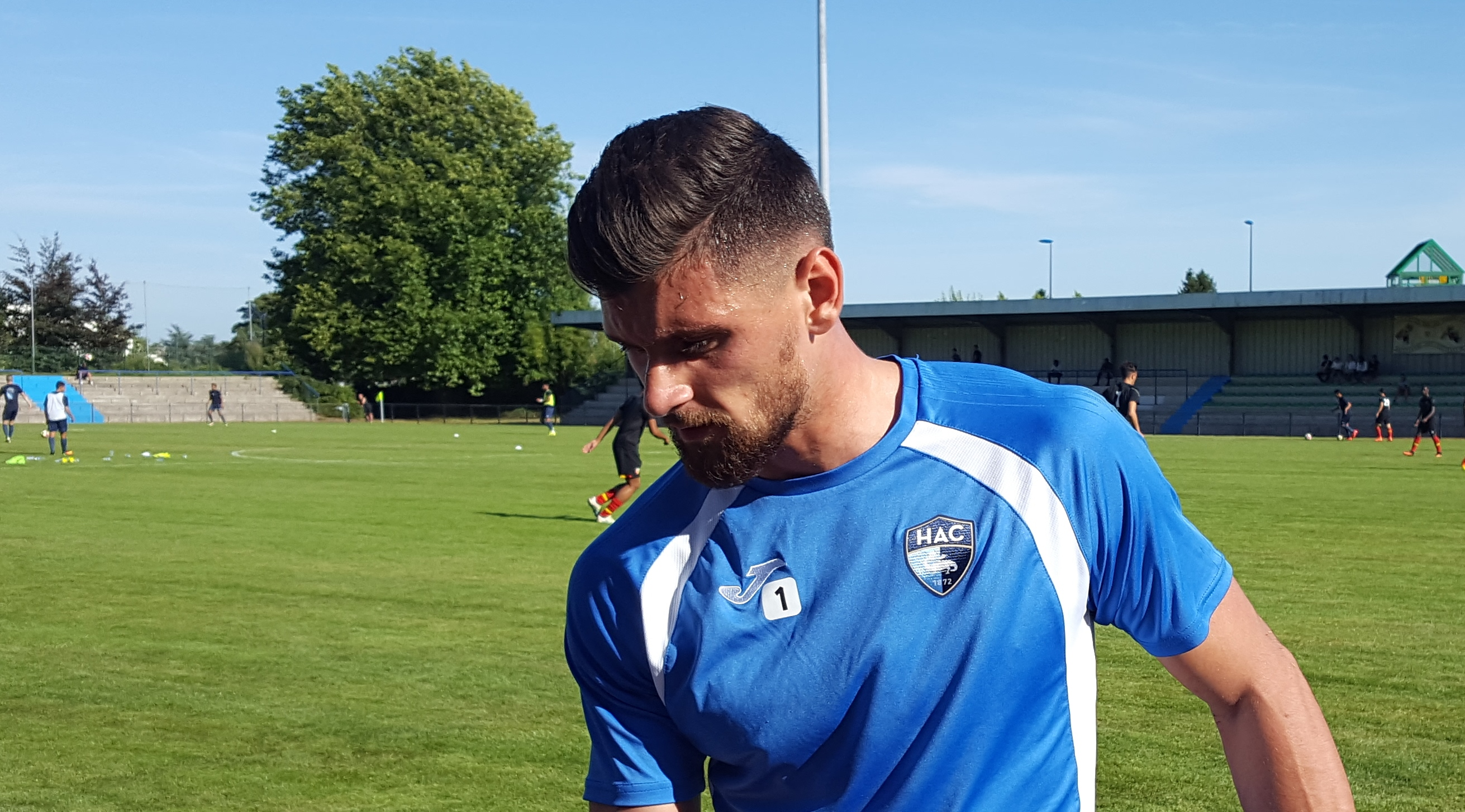
- Milosavljevic in 2016

Personal information
- Date of birth: 22 September 1993 (age 33)
- Place of birth: Mulhouse, France
- Height: 1.80 m (5 ft 11 in)
- Position: Goalkeeper

Youth career
- Châteauroux

Senior career*
Years	Team	Apps	(Gls)
2011–2014	Châteauroux	0	(0)
2012–2014	Châteauroux B	35	(0)
2014–2017	Le Havre	7	(0)
2014–2017	Le Havre B	49	(0)
2017–2018	Mulhouse	12	(0)
2018–2020	Bastia-Borgo	53	(0)
2020–2021	Thaon	1	(0)
2021–2022	Biesheim	6	(0)
- * Club domestic league appearances and goals as of 17:36, 15 June 2023 (UTC)

Stephen Milosavljevic (born 22 September 1993) is a French professional footballer who plays as a goalkeeper. He is of Serbian descent.

== Career ==
Born in Mulhouse, Milosavljevic started playing at Châteauroux where, after playing in the youth team, he became part of the main team in the 2010–11 season. He moved to Le Havre in 2014.
