= Romuald Marie =

French footballer (born 1988)

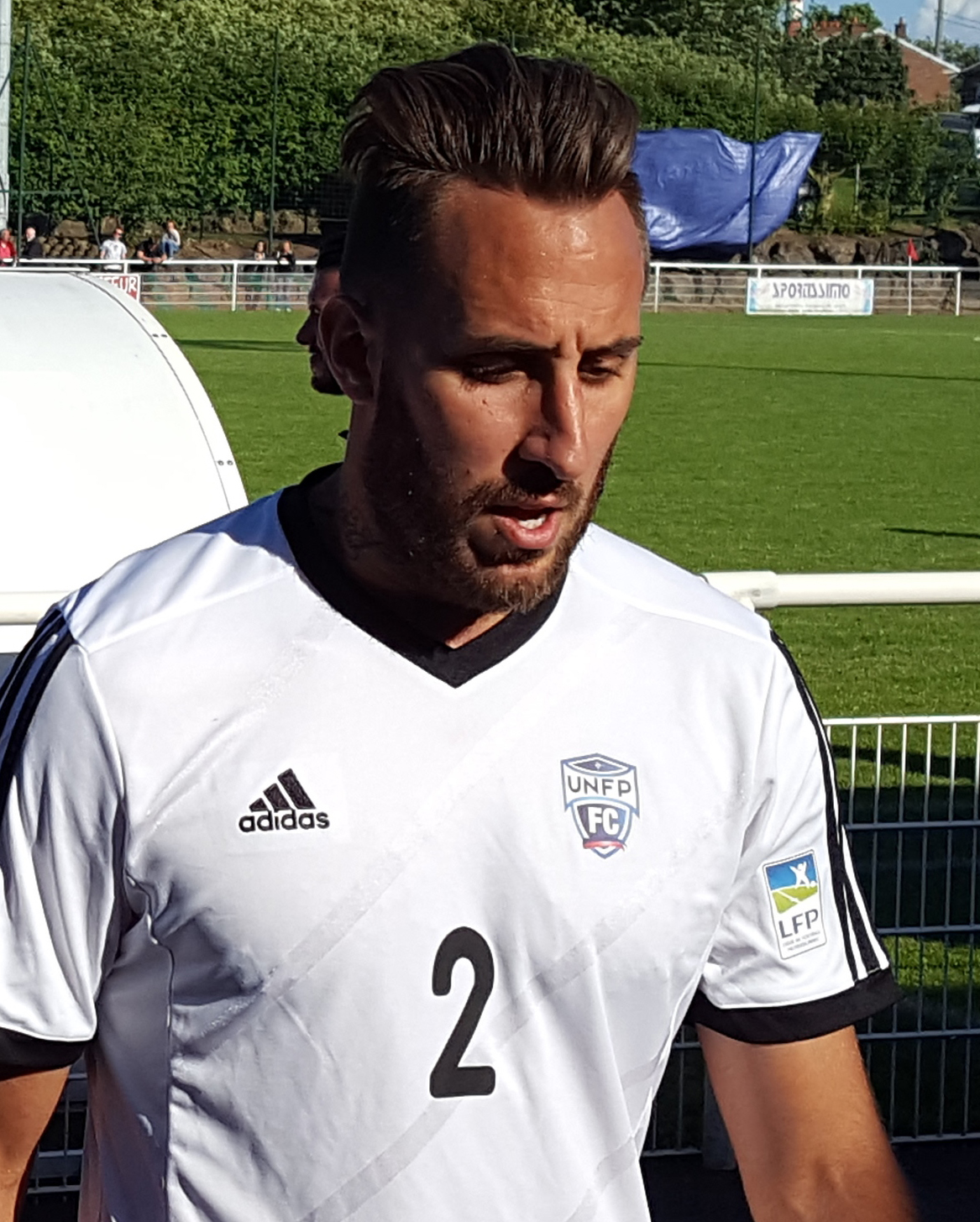
- Marie in July 2016

Personal information
- Date of birth: 19 May 1988 (age 38)
- Place of birth: Longjumeau, France
- Height: 1.82 m (6 ft 0 in)
- Position: Defender

Team information
- Current team: La Châtaigneraie

Youth career
- Strasbourg
- 2006–2008: Rennes

Senior career*
Years	Team	Apps	(Gls)
2008–2010	Cannes	52	(0)
2010–2011	Red Star	20	(0)
2011–2013	Poiré-sur-Vie B	5	(0)
2011–2013	Poiré-sur-Vie	36	(1)
2013–2016	Red Star	70	(2)
2016–2017	Paris FC	27	(1)
2017–2019	Les Herbiers	55	(2)
2019–2021	Annecy FC	27	(0)
2021–2022	Trélissac	22	(1)
2022–2024	La Roche VF	40	(0)
2024–	La Châtaigneraie	10	(0)
- * Club domestic league appearances and goals as of 7 December 2024

Romuald Marie (born 19 May 1988) is a French footballer who plays as a defender for Championnat National 3 club La Châtaigneraie.

== Club career ==
Trained as a youth with Strasbourg and Rennes, Marie spent two seasons with Cannes in the third tier, where he made over 50 league appearances. He signed for Red Star for the first time in October 2010.

Marie spent two seasons at the third tier with Poiré-sur-Vie before returning to Red Star in the summer of 2013. He helped Red Star gain promotion to Ligue 2 during the 2014–15 Championnat National season, and signed professional terms with the club in June 2015. He made his professional debut for the club on 1 December 2015 in a 3–1 win against FC Metz.

In July 2016, Marie moved across Paris to sign for Paris FC. He stayed in the Championnat National the following season with Les Herbiers. At Les Hebiers, he was part of the team that played in the 2018 Coupe de France Final.

In June 2019, Marie signed for Annecy FC.

== Honours ==
Les Herbiers

- Coupe de France runner-up: 2017–18
