= Eden Massouema =

French footballer (born 1997)

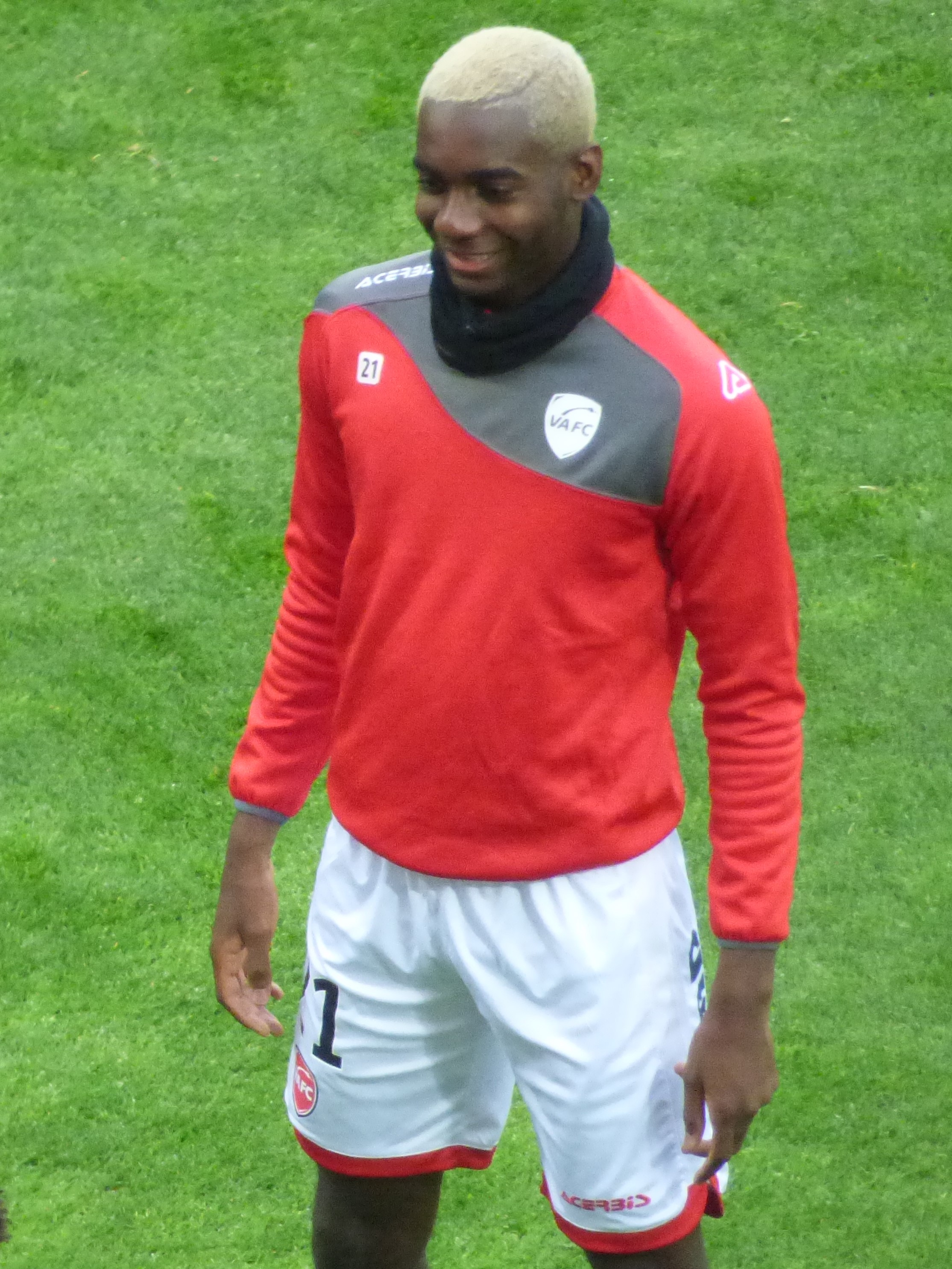
- Massouema in 2019

Personal information
- Date of birth: 29 June 1997 (age 29)
- Place of birth: Villepinte, France
- Height: 1.84 m (6 ft 0 in)
- Position: Midfielder

Team information
- Current team: ASD Polisportiva Gioiosa

Youth career
- 2002–2015: Aulnay-sous-Bois
- 2015: Drancy
- 2015–2016: Paris FC

Senior career*
Years	Team	Apps	(Gls)
2015	Drancy	2	(0)
2015–2017	Paris FC II	11	(0)
2016–2017	Paris FC	25	(0)
2017–2018	Dijon II	9	(0)
2018–2019	Dijon	6	(0)
2018–2019	→ Valenciennes (loan)	24	(0)
2019–2021	Troyes	3	(0)
2019–2021	Troyes II	5	(0)
2022–2023	Paris 13 Atletico		
2023–2024	La Louvière Centre	22	(2)
2025	Olbia	1	(0)
2025–	ASD Polisportiva Gioiosa		
- * Club domestic league appearances and goals as of 03.30, 15 October 2025 (UTC)

Eden Massouema (born 29 June 1997) is a French professional footballer who plays as a midfielder for ASD Polisportiva Gioiosa.

== Club career ==
Massouema arrived at Paris FC in the summer of 2015. He made his professional debut for the club in a 1–1 tie with Red Star on 9 August 2016.

After a successful debut season, Massouema transferred to Dijon in Ligue 1 on 12 June 2017. He made his professional debut for the club in an 8–0 Ligue 1 loss to Paris Saint-Germain on 17 January 2018, coming on as a late sub in the 61st minute.

On 29 December 2021, Massouema signed for Championnat National 2 side Paris 13 Atletico.

== International career ==
Born in France, Massouema has been called up to the Congo national team.

== Career statistics ==
As of 29 December 2021

Appearances and goals by club, season and competition
Club	Season	League			National Cup		League Cup		Other		Total	
Club	Season	Division	Apps	Goals	Apps	Goals	Apps	Goals	Apps	Goals	Apps	Goals
Drancy	2014–15	CFA	2	0	0	0	—		—		2	0
Paris FC II	2015–16	CFA 2	7	0	—		—		—		7	0
Paris FC II	2016–17	CFA 2	4	0	—		—		—		4	0
Paris FC II	Total		11	0	—		—		—		11	0
Paris FC	2016–17	National	25	0	0	0	2	0	2 (Note: Appearances in the Ligue 2 play-offs)	0	29	0
Dijon II	2017–18	National 3	9	0	—		—		—		9	0
Dijon	2017–18	Ligue 1	6	0	0	0	0	0	—		6	0
Valenciennes (loan)	2018–19	Ligue 2	24	0	1	0	1	0	—		26	0
Troyes	2019–20	Ligue 2	3	0	0	0	0	0	—		3	0
Troyes II	2019–20	National 3	5	0	—		—		—		5	0
Paris 13 Atletico	2021–22	National 2	0	0	0	0	—		—		0	0
Career total			85	0	1	0	3	0	2	0	91	0
