= Jacques Salze =

French footballer (born 1987)

Personal information
- Date of birth: April 20, 1987 (age 39)
- Place of birth: Montpellier, France
- Height: 1.85 m (6 ft 1 in)
- Position: Defender

Senior career*
Years	Team	Apps	(Gls)
2005–2006	Cannes		
2006–2009	Créteil	57	(1)
2009–2017	Clermont	147	(7)
2017–2018	Quevilly-Rouen	5	(0)
- * Club domestic league appearances and goals

Jacques Salze (born April 20, 1987) is a retired French professional footballer. He most recently played in Ligue 2 for US Quevilly, having played most of his career with Clermont in that division. After retirement at the end of the 2017–18 season, he trained as a referee with Clermont.
