= List of French football transfers summer 2015 =

This is a list of French football transfers for the 2015 summer transfer window. Only moves featuring Ligue 1 or Ligue 2 are listed.

== Ligue 1 ==
Note: Flags indicate national team as has been defined under FIFA eligibility rules. Players may hold more than one non-FIFA nationality.

=== Angers SCO ===
In:

No.	Pos.	Nation	Player
4	MF	TUN	Bilel Mohsni (free agent)
5	MF	FRA	Thomas Mangani (from (Italy) Chievo Verona)
8	DF	CIV	Ismaël Traoré (from Brest)
10	FW	FRA	Gilles Sunu (from Evian)
11	FW	FRA	Slimane Sissoko (from Vendée Luçon)
14	FW	FRA	Billy Ketkeophomphone (from Tours)
15	MF	FRA	Pierrick Capelle (from Clermont Foot)
17	MF	SEN	Cheikh N'Doye (from Créteil)
19	MF	FRA	Mathias Serin (from Romorantin)
21	DF	FRA	Yoann Andreu (from Gazélec Ajaccio)
22	FW	SUI	Goran Karanović (free agent)
27	FW	CGO	Férébory Doré (free agent)
28	DF	MAR	Romain Saïss (from Le Havre)

Out:

No.	Pos.	Nation	Player
5	DF	FRA	Fabien Boyer (to (Belgium) Kortrijk)
22	FW	FRA	Jonathan Kodjia (to (England) Bristol City)
—	MF	MAR	Rayan Frikeche (to Ajaccio)
—	MF	FRA	Nicolas Pépé (on loan to Orléans)
—	FW	FRA	Jérémy Blayac (to Strasbourg)

=== SC Bastia ===
In:

No.	Pos.	Nation	Player
1	GK	DEN	Jesper Hansen (from Evian)
2	MF	GUI	Sadio Diallo (from Rennes)
6	MF	FRA	Seko Fofana (on loan from (England) Manchester City)
14	MF	ALG	Mehdi Mostefa (from Lorient)
19	MF	FRA	Axel Ngando (from Rennes)
24	DF	MAR	Yassine Jebbour (from Montpellier)
—	FW	CMR	Franck Etoundi (from (Switzerland) Zürich)

Out:

No.	Pos.	Nation	Player
10	MF	ALG	Ryad Boudebouz (to Montpellier)
12	MF	FRA	Christophe Vincent (to Ajaccio)
19	FW	CIV	Giovanni Sio (to Rennes)
—	MF	MTN	Adama Ba (to Auxerre)

=== FC Girondins de Bordeaux ===
In:

No.	Pos.	Nation	Player
2	MF	SRB	Milan Gajić (from (Serbia) OFK Beograd)
4	DF	BRA	Pablo (from (Brazil) Ponte Preta)

Out:

No.	Pos.	Nation	Player
1	GK	SLO	Ažbe Jug (to (Portugal) Sporting CP)
2	DF	BRA	Mariano Ferreira (to (Spain) Sevilla)
—	FW	ARG	Emiliano Sala (to Nantes)

=== SM Caen ===
In:

No.	Pos.	Nation	Player
6	MF	FRA	Jonathan Delaplace (from Lille)
8	FW	FRA	Michaël Nkololo (from Clermont)
9	FW	FRA	Andy Delort (from (England) Wigan Athletic)
10	MF	BDI	Saidi Ntibazonkiza (free agent)
11	MF	FRA	Vincent Bessat (from Nantes)
13	DF	TUN	Syam Ben Youssef (free agent)
14	FW	HAI	Jeff Louis (from (Belgium) Standard Liège)
21	DF	COM	Chaker Alhadhur (from Nantes)
29	DF	FRA	Florian Le Joncour (free agent)

Out:

No.	Pos.	Nation	Player
7	FW	FRA	Mathieu Duhamel (to Le Havre)
10	FW	FRA	Lenny Nangis (to Lille)
11	FW	FRA	Bengali-Fodé Koita (to (England) Blackburn Rovers)
17	MF	FRA	N'Golo Kanté (to (England) Leicester City)
27	MF	FRA	Thomas Lemar (to Monaco)
29	DF	GAB	Yrondu Musavu-King (to (Spain) Granada)

=== Gazélec Ajaccio ===
In:

No.	Pos.	Nation	Player
3	DF	GUI	Issiaga Sylla (on loan from Toulouse)
8	MF	FRA	Jérôme Lemoigne (from Lens)
13	DF	FRA	Alassane Touré (from Tours)
15	DF	SEN	Kader Mangane (free agent)
19	FW	CMR	Jacques Zoua (from (Germany) Hamburg)
22	FW	SEN	Issiar Dia (from (Qatar) Lekhwiya)
23	MF	CRO	Damjan Đoković (from (Italy) Bologna)
29	DF	FRA	Alexandre Coeff (on loan from (Italy) Udinese)

Out:

No.	Pos.	Nation	Player
—	DF	FRA	Yoann Andreu (to Angers)
—	MF	FRA	Florian Fabre (to Nîmes)
—	MF	FRA	Cyriaque Rivieyran (to Clermont Foot)

=== En Avant de Guingamp ===
In:

No.	Pos.	Nation	Player
9	MF	FRA	Nicolas Benezet (from Evian)
11	FW	FRA	Sloan Privat (on loan from (Belgium) Gent)
12	MF	BEL	Nill De Pauw (from (Belgium) Lokeren)
23	FW	FRA	Jimmy Briand (from (Germany) Hannover 96)

Out:

No.	Pos.	Nation	Player
12	FW	FRA	Claudio Beauvue (to Lyon)
—	DF	GUI	Baissama Sankoh (on loan to Brest)
—	FW	MAR	Rachid Alioui (on loan to Laval)

=== Lille OSC ===
In:

No.	Pos.	Nation	Player
5	DF	ARG	Renato Civelli (from (Turkey) Bursaspor)
6	DF	CMR	Ibrahim Amadou (from Nancy)
8	MF	MAR	Mounir Obbadi (from Monaco)
9	FW	FRA	Yassine Benzia (from Lyon)
11	MF	FRA	Éric Bauthéac (from Nice)
12	FW	FRA	Serhou Guirassy (from Laval)
13	DF	ZAM	Stoppila Sunzu (on loan from (China) Shanghai Greenland Shenhua)
14	FW	GHA	Yaw Yeboah (on loan from (England) Manchester City)
15	FW	FRA	Lenny Nangis (from SM Caen)
27	FW	BEL	Baptiste Guillaume (from Lens)
28	FW	CIV	Tallo Gadji (from (Italy) Roma)
40	GK	FRA	Mike Maignan (from PSG)

Out:

No.	Pos.	Nation	Player
5	MF	SEN	Idrissa Gueye (to (England) Aston Villa)
6	MF	FRA	Jonathan Delaplace (to SM Caen)
14	DF	DEN	Simon Kjær (to (Turkey) Fenerbahçe)
22	DF	CZE	David Rozehnal (to (Belgium) Oostende)
26	FW	FRA	Nolan Roux (to Saint-Étienne)
29	FW	CRC	John Jairo Ruiz (on loan to (Ukraine) Dnipro Dnipropetrovsk)
—	MF	MLI	Abdoulay Diaby (to (Belgium) Club Brugge)
—	FW	CGO	Kévin Koubemba (on loan to Brest)
—	FW	CPV	Ryan Mendes (on loan to (England) Nottingham Forest)

=== FC Lorient ===
In:

No.	Pos.	Nation	Player
9	MF	GHA	Abdul Majeed Waris (from (Turkey) Trabzonspor)
23	FW	CIV	Moryké Fofana (from (Norway) Lillestrøm)

Out:

No.	Pos.	Nation	Player
3	DF	POR	Pedrinho (to (Portugal) Rio Ave)
5	MF	ALG	Mehdi Mostefa (to Bastia)
9	FW	GHA	Jordan Ayew (to (England) Aston Villa)
10	MF	FRA	Mathieu Coutadeur (to (Cyprus) AEL Limassol)
15	FW	FRA	Fabien Robert (to (England) Swindon Town)

=== Olympique Lyonnais ===
In:

No.	Pos.	Nation	Player
2	DF	FRA	Mapou Yanga-Mbiwa (from (Italy) Roma)
9	FW	FRA	Claudio Beauvue (from Guingamp)
14	MF	ESP	Sergi Darder (from (Spain) Málaga)
15	DF	FRA	Jeremy Morel (from Marseille)
19	MF	FRA	Mathieu Valbuena (from (Russia) Dynamo Moscow)
20	DF	BRA	Rafael (from (England) Manchester United)
24	MF	FRA	Olivier Kemen (from (England) Newcastle United)

Out:

No.	Pos.	Nation	Player
2	DF	ALG	Mehdi Zeffane (to Stade Rennes)
14	FW	CMR	Clinton N'Jie (to (England) Tottenham Hotspur)
19	FW	GUI	Mohamed Yattara (to (Belgium) Standard Liège)
25	FW	FRA	Yassine Benzia (to Lille)
29	MF	FRA	Farès Bahlouli (to Monaco)
31	DF	FRA	Louis Nganioni (on loan to (Netherlands) Utrecht)

=== Olympique de Marseille ===
In:

No.	Pos.	Nation	Player
2	DF	ESP	Javier Manquillo (on loan from (Spain) Atlético Madrid)
4	DF	NED	Karim Rekik (from (England) Manchester City)
5	MF	FRA	Abou Diaby (free agent)
6	DF	POR	Rolando (from (Portugal) Porto)
7	FW	ARG	Lucas Ocampos (from Monaco)
8	MF	BRA	Lucas Silva (on loan from (Spain) Real Madrid)
10	MF	FRA	Lassana Diarra (free agent)
13	MF	FRA	Rémy Cabella (on loan from (England) Newcastle United)
14	MF	FRA	Georges-Kévin Nkoudou (from Nantes)
16	GK	FRA	Yohann Pelé (from Sochaux)
17	MF	FRA	Bouna Sarr (from Metz)
18	MF	CHI	Mauricio Isla (on loan from (Italy) Juventus)
25	DF	ITA	Paolo De Ceglie (on loan from (Italy) Juventus)
29	MF	CMR	André-Frank Zambo (from Stade Reims)
99	DF	NOR	Eirik Haugan (from (Norway) Molde)

Out:

No.	Pos.	Nation	Player
8	MF	FRA	Mario Lemina (on loan to (Italy) Juventus)
9	FW	FRA	André-Pierre Gignac (to (Mexico) Tigres)
10	FW	GHA	André Ayew (to (Wales) Swansea City)
10	MF	FRA	Florian Thauvin (to (England) Newcastle United)
15	DF	FRA	Jeremy Morel (to Lyon)
16	GK	FRA	Brice Samba (on loan to Nancy)
17	MF	FRA	Dimitri Payet (to (England) West Ham United)
24	DF	FRA	Rod Fanni (to (Qatar) Al-Arabi)
25	MF	FRA	Gianelli Imbula (to (Portugal) Porto)
40	GK	FRA	Julien Fabri (on loan to Bourg-Péronnas)
-	DF	FRA	Laurent Abergel (to Ajaccio)
-	DF	BRA	Dória (on loan to (Spain) Granada)
-	MF	ALG	Foued Kadir (to (Spain) Real Betis)
-	FW	SEN	Modou Sougou (to (England) Sheffield Wednesday)

=== AS Monaco ===
In:

No.	Pos.	Nation	Player
2	DF	BRA	Fabinho (from (Portugal) Rio Ave)
4	DF	POR	Fábio Coentrão (on loan from (Spain) Real Madrid)
11	FW	ARG	Guido Carrillo (from (Argentina) Estudiantes)
12	MF	FRA	Farès Bahlouli (from Lyon)
16	GK	FRA	Paul Nardi (from Nancy)
17	FW	POR	Ivan Cavaleiro (from (Portugal) Benfica)
18	FW	POR	Hélder Costa (on loan from (Portugal) Benfica)
20	MF	CRO	Mario Pašalić (on loan from (England) Chelsea)
22	FW	ITA	Stephan El Shaarawy (on loan from (Italy) Milan)
25	MF	POR	Rony Lopes (from (England) Manchester City)
27	MF	FRA	Thomas Lemar (from SM Caen)
29	MF	BRA	Gabriel Boschilia (from (Brazil) São Paulo)
—	MF	FRA	Allan Saint-Maximin (from Saint-Étienne)
—	FW	FRA	Corentin Jean (from Troyes)

Out:

No.	Pos.	Nation	Player
3	DF	FRA	Layvin Kurzawa (to PSG)
4	DF	ESP	Borja López (on loan to (Portugal) Arouca)
5	DF	TUN	Aymen Abdennour (to (Spain) Valencia)
9	FW	COL	Radamel Falcao (on loan to (England) Chelsea)
9	FW	FRA	Anthony Martial (to (England) Manchester United)
10	FW	BUL	Dimitar Berbatov (released)
17	MF	BEL	Yannick Carrasco (to (Spain) Atlético Madrid)
18	FW	FRA	Valère Germain (on loan to Nice)
22	MF	FRA	Geoffrey Kondogbia (to (Italy) Inter Milan)
25	MF	FRA	Jessy Pi (on loan to Troyes)
26	MF	CMR	Edgar Salli (on loan to (Switzerland) St. Gallen)
29	MF	FRA	Dylan Bahamboula (on loan to Paris)
33	FW	FRA	Aboubakar Kamara (to (Belgium) Kortrjik)
34	DF	FRA	Abdou Diallo (on loan to (Belgium) Zulte Waregem)
40	GK	FRA	Marc-Aurèle Caillard (to Clermont Foot)
-	DF	FRA	Nicolas Isimat-Mirin (to (Netherlands) PSV)
-	MF	FRA	Morgan Kamin (to Evian)
-	MF	GHA	David Mills (on loan to Paris)
-	MF	CGO	Delvin N'Dinga (on loan to (Russia) Lokomotiv Moscow)
-	MF	MAR	Mounir Obbadi (to Lille)
-	MF	ARG	Lucas Ocampos (to Marseille)
—	MF	FRA	Allan Saint-Maximin (on loan to (Germany) Hannover 96)
—	FW	GUI	Tafsir Chérif (to (Portugal) Arouca)
—	FW	FRA	Corentin Jean (on loan to Troyes)
—	FW	ITA	Gaetano Monachello (to (Italy) Atalanta)
—	FW	CAF	Quentin Ngakoutou (on loan to Evian)

=== Montpellier HSC ===
In:

No.	Pos.	Nation	Player
10	MF	ALG	Ryad Boudebouz (from Bastia)
18	DF	ALG	Ramy Bensebaini (on loan from (Algeria) Paradou AC)

Out:

No.	Pos.	Nation	Player
7	FW	FRA	Anthony Mounier (to (Italy) Bologna)
21	DF	MAR	Abdelhamid El Kaoutari (to (Italy) Palermo)
-	DF	MAR	Yassine Jebbour (to Bastia)

=== FC Nantes ===
In:

No.	Pos.	Nation	Player
3	DF	ALB	Ermir Lenjani (on loan from Rennes)
5	DF	ALB	Lorik Cana (from (Italy) Lazio)
9	FW	ISL	Kolbeinn Sigþórsson (from (Netherlands) Ajax)
13	MF	FRA	Wilfried Moimbé (from Brest)
22	FW	ARG	Emiliano Sala (from Bordeaux)

Out:

No.	Pos.	Nation	Player
2	DF	DEN	Kian Hansen (to (Denmark) Midtjylland)
3	DF	SEN	Papy Djilobodji (to (England) Chelsea)
5	DF	FRA	Olivier Veigneau (to (Turkey) Kasımpaşa)
8	MF	FRA	Vincent Bessat (to SM Caen)
9	FW	ISR	Itay Shechter (released)
13	FW	TOG	Serge Gakpé (to (Italy) Genoa)
14	MF	FRA	Georges-Kévin Nkoudou (to Marseille)
22	DF	SEN	Issa Cissokho (to (Italy) Genoa)
24	DF	COM	Chaker Alhadhur (to SM Caen)
25	MF	FRA	Jordan Veretout (to (England) Aston Villa)

=== OGC Nice ===
In:

No.	Pos.	Nation	Player
4	DF	FRA	Paul Baysse (on loan from Saint-Étienne)
6	MF	CIV	Jean Seri (from (Portugal) Paços de Ferreira)
9	FW	FRA	Hatem Ben Arfa (free agent)
10	MF	FRA	Mickaël Le Bihan (from Le Havre)
19	MF	BRA	Wallyson Mallmann (on loan from (Portugal) Sporting)
20	DF	FRA	Maxime Le Marchand (from Le Havre)
23	DF	POR	Ricardo (on loan from (Portugal) Porto)
28	FW	FRA	Valère Germain (on loan from Monaco)

Out:

No.	Pos.	Nation	Player
6	MF	FRA	Didier Digard (to (Spain) Real Betis)
11	MF	FRA	Éric Bauthéac (to Lille)
19	DF	FRA	Jordan Amavi (to (England) Aston Villa)
23	FW	FRA	Alexy Bosetti (on loan to Tours)
30	GK	FRA	Joris Delle (to RC Lens)

=== Paris Saint Germain ===
In:

No.	Pos.	Nation	Player
4	MF	FRA	Benjamin Stambouli (from (England) Tottenham Hotspur)
11	MF	ARG	Ángel Di María (from (England) Manchester United)
16	GK	GER	Kevin Trapp (from (Germany) Eintracht Frankfurt)
19	DF	CIV	Serge Aurier (from Toulouse)
20	DF	FRA	Layvin Kurzawa (from Monaco)

Out:

No.	Pos.	Nation	Player
4	MF	FRA	Yohan Cabaye (to (England) Crystal Palace)
6	DF	FRA	Zoumana Camara (Retired)
16	GK	FRA	Mike Maignan (to Lille)
21	DF	FRA	Lucas Digne (on loan to (Italy) Roma)
—	GK	FRA	Alphonse Areola (on loan to (Spain) Villarreal)
—	MF	FRA	Romain Habran (on loan to Stade Lavallois)
—	MF	BRA	Gustavo Hebling (on loan to (Netherlands) Zwolle)

=== Stade de Reims ===
In:

No.	Pos.	Nation	Player
4	MF	GEO	Jaba Kankava (from (Ukraine) Dnipro Dnipropetrovsk)
18	MF	GAB	Frédéric Bulot (from (Belgium) Standard Liège)
—	MF	GAM	Hassane Kamara (from Châteauroux)

Out:

No.	Pos.	Nation	Player
17	MF	DEN	Mads Albæk (to (Sweden) IFK Göteborg)
—	MF	GAM	Hassane Kamara (on loan to Paris FC)
—	MF	CMR	André-Frank Zambo (to Marseille)
—	FW	FRA	Gaëtan Courtet (to Auxerre)

=== Stade Rennais F.C. ===
In:

No.	Pos.	Nation	Player
2	DF	ALG	Mehdi Zeffane (from Lyon)
5	DF	POR	Pedro Mendes (from (Italy) Parma)
9	MF	FRA	Yoann Gourcuff (free agent)
11	MF	COL	Juan Quintero (on loan from (Portugal) Porto)
13	FW	CIV	Giovanni Sio (from Bastia)
17	FW	FRA	Jeremie Boga (on loan from (England) Chelsea)
20	MF	MLI	Yacouba Sylla (from (England) Aston Villa)
24	DF	FRA	Ludovic Baal (from Lens)

Out:

No.	Pos.	Nation	Player
9	FW	SWE	Ola Toivonen (on loan to (England) Sunderland)
11	FW	AUT	Philipp Hosiner (on loan to (Germany) 1. FC Köln)
13	MF	BEL	Christian Brüls (on loan to (Belgium) Standard Liège)
17	MF	FRA	Vincent Pajot (to Saint-Étienne)
19	DF	ALB	Ermir Lenjani (on loan to Nantes)
23	MF	NOR	Anders Konradsen (to (Norway) Rosenborg)
24	MF	BIH	Sanjin Prcić (on loan to (Italy) Torino)
25	MF	FRA	Zana Allée (to Ajaccio)
28	DF	MKD	Gjoko Zajkov (on loan to (Belgium) Charleroi)
30	GK	FRA	Christopher Dilo (to Dijon)
-	MF	GUI	Sadio Diallo (to Bastia)
-	MF	FRA	Axel Ngando (to Bastia)
-	FW	FRA	Wesley Saïd (on loan to Dijon)

=== AS Saint-Étienne ===
In:

No.	Pos.	Nation	Player
2	DF	FRA	Kévin Théophile-Catherine (from (Wales) Cardiff City)
5	MF	FRA	Vincent Pajot (from Rennes)
9	FW	FRA	Nolan Roux (from Lille)
27	FW	SLO	Robert Berić (from (Austria) Rapid Wien)
32	DF	CMR	Benoît Assou-Ekotto (free agent)
—	MF	LTU	Dovydas Virkšas (from (Lithuania) Atlantas)

Out:

No.	Pos.	Nation	Player
7	FW	CIV	Max Gradel (to (England) Bournemouth)
9	FW	TUR	Mevlüt Erdinç (to (Germany) Hannover 96)
11	FW	FRA	Yohan Mollo (on loan to (Russia) Krylia Sovetov)
12	MF	FRA	Allan Saint-Maximin (to Monaco)
23	DF	FRA	Paul Baysse (on loan to Nice)
27	DF	FRA	Franck Tabanou (to (Wales) Swansea City)

=== Toulouse FC ===
In:

No.	Pos.	Nation	Player
1	GK	URU	Mauro Goicoechea (from (Portugal) Arouca)
19	MF	BRA	Somalia (from (Hungary) Ferencváros)

Out:

No.	Pos.	Nation	Player
1	GK	FRA	Zacharie Boucher (to Auxerre)
5	DF	GUI	Issiaga Sylla (on loan to Ajaccio)
—	DF	CIV	Serge Aurier (to PSG)
—	DF	SRB	Dušan Veškovac (on loan to Troyes)

=== Troyes AC ===
In:

No.	Pos.	Nation	Player
2	DF	FRA	Johan Martial (from Brest)
3	DF	COD	Chris Mavinga (on loan from (Russia) Rubin Kazan)
13	FW	COL	Brayan Perea (on loan from (Italy) Lazio)
23	MF	TUN	Fabien Camus (from (Belgium) Genk)
25	MF	FRA	Jessy Pi (on loan from Monaco)
27	FW	FRA	Corentin Jean (on loan from Monaco)
31	DF	RSA	Anele Ngcongca (on loan from (Belgium) Genk)
32	DF	SRB	Dušan Veškovac (on loan from Toulouse)
—	MF	FRA	Yanis Hamzaoui (from Valenciennes II)

Out:

No.	Pos.	Nation	Player
23	DF	FRA	Lionel Carole (to (Turkey) Galatasaray)
—	DF	FRA	Salimo Sylla (to Auxerre)
—	FW	CMR	Christian Bekamenga (to (Turkey) Karabükspor)
—	FW	FRA	Corentin Jean (to Monaco)

== Ligue 2 ==
=== AC Ajaccio ===
In:

No.	Pos.	Nation	Player
5	DF	FRA	Zakaria Diallo (from Dijon)
9	FW	RUS	Andrei Panyukov (on loan from (Lithuania) Atlantas)
12	DF	CIV	Zié Diabaté (from Dijon)
14	FW	FRA	Julien Toudic (from Bastia)
15	MF	MAR	Rayan Frikeche (from Angers)
17	FW	FRA	Riad Nouri (from Nîmes)
19	DF	FRA	Laurent Abergel (from Marseille)
20	DF	FRA	Anthony Lippini (from Clermont Foot)
22	MF	FRA	Christophe Vincent (from Bastia)
25	MF	FRA	Zana Allée (from Rennes)

Out:

No.	Pos.	Nation	Player
8	MF	FRA	Gary Coulibaly (to (Belgium) Waasland-Beveren)
—	MF	FRA	Benoît Pedretti (to Nancy)

=== AJ Auxerre ===
In:

No.	Pos.	Nation	Player
1	GK	FRA	Zacharie Boucher (from Toulouse)
10	MF	SEN	Mouhamadou Diaw (from Chamois Niortais)
11	MF	MTN	Adama Ba (from Bastia)
18	FW	FRA	Gaëtan Courtet (from Stade Reims)
19	MF	FRA	Alexandre Vincent (Promoted)
21	MF	SEN	Ibrahima Seck (from Créteil)
27	DF	FRA	Salimo Sylla (from Troyes)
30	GK	FRA	Xavier Lenogue (Promoted)

Out:

No.	Pos.	Nation	Player
4	DF	FRA	Jean-Charles Castelletto (to (Belgium) Club Brugge)
9	MF	FRA	Frédéric Sammaritano (to Dijon)
10	FW	FRA	Julien Viale (to Laval)
17	DF	FRA	Karim Djellabi (to Clermont Foot)
30	GK	GUF	Donovan Léon (to Brest)
-	FW	FRA	Sébastien Haller (to (Netherlands) Utrecht)

=== Bourg-Péronnas ===
In:

No.	Pos.	Nation	Player
30	GK	FRA	Julien Fabri (on loan from Marseille)

Out:

No.	Pos.	Nation	Player

=== Stade Brestois 29 ===
In:

No.	Pos.	Nation	Player
1	GK	GUF	Donovan Léon (from Auxerre)
4	DF	CIV	Éric Tié Bi (from (Greece) Asteras Tripolis)
5	DF	GUI	Baissama Sankoh (on loan from Guingamp)
9	FW	NED	Melvin Platje (from (Netherlands) VVV-Venlo)
10	MF	ITA	Cristian Battocchio (from (England) Watford)
15	DF	CIV	Ali Keïta (from Avranches)
17	DF	FRA	Jean-Alain Fanchone (from (Romania) Petrolul Ploıeşti)
20	DF	FRA	Grégory Lorenzi (from (Germany) Jahn Regensburg)
22	FW	CGO	Kévin Koubemba (on loan from Lille)
28	FW	FRA	Steeven Joseph-Monrose (from (Belgium) Genk)

Out:

No.	Pos.	Nation	Player
10	MF	MAR	Chahir Belghazouani (to (Greece) Levadiakos)
13	MF	FRA	Wilfried Moimbé (to Nantes)
—	GK	FRA	Alexis Thébaux (to Paris)
—	DF	FRA	Johan Martial (to Troyes)
—	DF	CIV	Ismaël Traoré (to Angers)
—	DF	FRA	Stéphane Tritz (released)

=== Clermont Foot ===
In:

No.	Pos.	Nation	Player
1	GK	FRA	Marc-Aurèle Caillard (from Monaco)
7	MF	FRA	Farid Boulaya (from Istres)
10	FW	FRA	Ludovic Genest (from Créteil)
17	DF	FRA	Karim Djellabi (from Auxerre)

Out:

No.	Pos.	Nation	Player
15	MF	FRA	Thibault Moulin (to (Belgium) Waasland-Beveren)
29	MF	FRA	Kévin Diogo (on loan to Châteauroux)
39	FW	FRA	Idriss Saadi (to (Wales) Cardiff City)
—	DF	FRA	Anthony Lippini (to Ajaccio)
—	MF	FRA	Pierrick Capelle (to Angers)
—	FW	FRA	Michaël Nkololo (to SM Caen)

=== US Créteil-Lusitanos ===
In:

No.	Pos.	Nation	Player
30	GK	FRA	Maxime Bouveret (from Paris)

Out:

No.	Pos.	Nation	Player
19	FW	FRA	Ludovic Genest (to Clermont Foot)
—	MF	SEN	Cheikh N'Doye (to Angers)
—	MF	SEN	Ibrahima Seck (to Auxerre)
—	FW	CMR	Marcel Essombé (to (Romania) Dinamo București)

=== Dijon FCO ===
In:

No.	Pos.	Nation	Player
1	GK	FRA	Christopher Dilo (from Rennes)
5	DF	FRA	Quentin Bernard (from Chamois Niortais)
6	DF	FRA	Christopher Jullien (on loan from (Germany) Freiburg)
12	FW	FRA	Wesley Saïd (on loan from Rennes)
18	MF	FRA	Frédéric Sammaritano (from Auxerre)
23	MF	FRA	Granddi Ngoyi (on loan from (Italy) Palermo)

Out:

No.	Pos.	Nation	Player
1	GK	FRA	Florent Perraud (released)
19	DF	FRA	Samuel Souprayen (to (Italy) Verona)
—	DF	CIV	Zié Diabaté (to Ajaccio)
—	DF	FRA	Zakaria Diallo (to Ajaccio)
—	MF	MLI	Ousseynou Cissé (to (Spain) Rayo Vallecano)
—	FW	FRA	Grégory Thil (released)

=== Evian Thonon Gaillard F.C. ===
In:

No.	Pos.	Nation	Player
3	DF	BRA	Betão (from (Ukraine) Dynamo Kyiv)
4	DF	GAB	Aaron Appindangoyé (on loan from (Gabon) Mounana)
5	MF	CIV	Blati Touré (on loan from (Spain) Recreativo Huelva)
7	FW	CAF	Quentin Ngakoutou (on loan from Monaco)
10	MF	FRA	Kévin Hoggas (from Belfort)
11	FW	GUI	Sekou Keita (on loan from (Spain) Atlético Madrid B)
15	MF	CIV	Lamine N'Dao (from (Ivory Coast) Kokumbo)
21	MF	BRA	Gustavo Campanharo (on loan from (Brazil) Bragantino)
22	FW	ARG	Hernán Altolaguirre (on loan from (Argentina) Newell's Old Boys)
23	MF	FRA	Morgan Kamin (from Monaco)
28	MF	BRA	Bruno da Cruz (from (Brazil) Itabaiana)
—	DF	CIV	Guillaume Yao (from (Ivory Coast) Kokumbo)

Out:

No.	Pos.	Nation	Player
6	MF	BFA	Djakaridja Koné (to (Turkey) Sivasspor)
15	FW	FRA	Gilles Sunu (to Angers)
18	DF	DEN	Daniel Wass (to (Spain) Celta Vigo)
21	DF	COD	Cédric Mongongu (to (Turkey) Eskişehirspor)
22	DF	FRA	Cédric Cambon (to Le Havre)
23	FW	DEN	Nicki Bille Nielsen (to (Denmark) Esbjerg)
26	DF	DEN	Jesper Juelsgård (to (Denmark) Brøndby)
30	GK	DEN	Jesper Hansen (to Bastia)
—	MF	FRA	Nicolas Benezet (to Guingamp)

=== Stade Lavallois ===
In:

No.	Pos.	Nation	Player
7	FW	MAR	Rachid Alioui (on loan from Guingamp)
9	MF	FRA	Romain Habran (on loan from PSG)
11	MF	CGO	Chris Malonga (from (Switzerland) Lausanne-Sport)
12	DF	FRA	Kévin Afougou (from Châteauroux)
17	FW	FRA	Julien Viale (from Auxerre)
19	FW	FRA	Alassane N'Diaye (from Arles-Avignon)
25	MF	FRA	Erwan Quintin (from Châteauroux)

Out:

No.	Pos.	Nation	Player
5	MF	FRA	Ludovic Guerriero (released)
14	MF	FRA	Maxime Bourgeois (released)
—	FW	FRA	Serhou Guirassy (to Lille)

=== Le Havre AC ===
In:

No.	Pos.	Nation	Player
6	DF	ROU	Costinel Gugu (from (Romania) Târgus Mureș)
10	FW	FRA	Mathieu Duhamel (from SM Caen)
26	DF	FRA	Cédric Cambon (from Evian)
27	FW	FRA	Ghislain Gimbert (from (Belgium) Zulte Waregem)

Out:

No.	Pos.	Nation	Player
—	DF	FRA	Maxime Le Marchand (to Nice)
—	DF	MAR	Romain Saïss (to Angers)
—	MF	FRA	Mickaël Le Bihan (to Nice)

=== RC Lens ===
In:

No.	Pos.	Nation	Player
1	GK	FRA	Joris Delle (from Nice)
3	DF	SRB	Dušan Cvetinović (on loan from (Norway) Haugesund)
10	MF	DEN	Patrick Olsen (free agent)
21	DF	FRA	Anthony Scaramozzino (from (Cyprus) Omonia)
27	DF	FRA	Kenny Lala (from Valenciennes)

Out:

No.	Pos.	Nation	Player
1	GK	FRA	Rudy Riou (to (Belgium) OH Leuven)
4	DF	MAR	Ahmed Kantari (to (Canada) Toronto)
19	FW	BEL	Baptiste Guillaume (to Lille)
21	MF	MAR	Alharbi El Jadeyaoui (to (Azerbaijan) Qarabağ)
24	DF	FRA	Ludovic Baal (to Rennes)
27	DF	FRA	Benjamin Boulenger (to (Belgium) Charleroi)
—	FW	FRA	David Faupala (to (England) Manchester City)

=== FC Metz ===
In:

No.	Pos.	Nation	Player
12	FW	GBS	Amido Baldé (from (Scotland) Celtic)
25	DF	ESP	Iván Balliu (from (Portugal) Arouca)
32	DF	POR	Tiago Gomes (on loan from (Portugal) Braga)
-	FW	ZAM	Emmanuel Mayuka (from (England) Southampton)

Out:

No.	Pos.	Nation	Player
10	MF	FRA	Bouna Sarr (to Marseille)
13	MF	FRA	Florent Malouda (to (India) Delhi Dynamos)
18	DF	FRA	Jérémy Choplin (to Chamois Niortais)
21	MF	ALG	Ahmed Kashi (to (England) Charlton Athletic)

=== AS Nancy ===
In:

No.	Pos.	Nation	Player
18	MF	MTN	Diallo Guidileye (from (Cyprus) AEL Limassol)
19	FW	FRA	Loïc Puyo (from Orléans)
20	DF	MAR	Michaël Chrétien Basser (from Strasbourg)
25	MF	FRA	Benoît Pedretti (from Ajaccio)
30	GK	FRA	Brice Samba (on loan from Marseille)

Out:

No.	Pos.	Nation	Player
20	DF	CMR	Ibrahim Amadou (to Lille)
—	DF	COD	Joël Sami (to (Belgium) Zulte Waregem)

=== Nîmes Olympique ===
In:

No.	Pos.	Nation	Player
12	MF	FRA	Florian Fabre (from Gazélec Ajaccio)

Out:

No.	Pos.	Nation	Player
7	MF	FRA	Mathieu Robail (to Bastia)
21	FW	FRA	Riad Nouri (to Ajaccio)
—	MF	SEN	Mouhamadou Diaw (to Auxerre)

=== Chamois Niortais F.C. ===
In:

No.	Pos.	Nation	Player
3	DF	BEN	David Kiki (from Belfort)
6	DF	FRA	Jérémy Choplin (from Metz)
11	FW	FRA	Adrian Dabasse (from Bordeaux B)
25	DF	FRA	Thomas-Steven Da Veiga (from Monaco B)

Out:

No.	Pos.	Nation	Player
—	DF	FRA	Yoann Barbet (to (England) Brenford)
—	DF	FRA	Quentin Bernard (to Dijon)

=== Paris FC ===
In:

No.	Pos.	Nation	Player
18	MF	GHA	David Mills (on loan from Monaco)
24	MF	FRA	Dylan Bahamboula (on loan from Monaco)
30	GK	FRA	Alexis Thébaux (from Brest)
-	MF	GAM	Hassane Kamara (on loan from Reims)

Out:

No.	Pos.	Nation	Player
—	GK	FRA	Maxime Bouveret (to Créteil)

=== Red Star FC ===
In:

No.	Pos.	Nation	Player
22	MF	FRA	Ange-Freddy Plumain (on loan from (England) Fulham)

Out:

No.	Pos.	Nation	Player

=== FC Sochaux-Montbéliard ===
In:

No.	Pos.	Nation	Player
1	GK	BEL	Olivier Werner (from (Belgium) Cercle Brugge)
4	DF	CMR	Adolphe Teikeu (from (Ukraine) Chornomorest Odesa)
10	MF	ESP	Rubén Rayos (from (Israel) Maccabi Haifa)
18	FW	CIV	Sekou Cissé (on loan from (Belgium) Genk)

Out:

No.	Pos.	Nation	Player
-	GK	FRA	Yohann Pelé (to Marseille)

=== Tours FC ===
In:

No.	Pos.	Nation	Player
14	MF	ALG	Laurent Agouazi (from (Greece) Atromitos)
16	GK	USA	Quentin Westberg (from (Norway) Sarpsborg 08)
23	FW	FRA	Alexy Bosetti (on loan from Nice)

Out:

No.	Pos.	Nation	Player
20	FW	FRA	Billy Ketkeophomphone (to Angers)
27	MF	CIV	Joël Damahou (to (Cyprus) Pafos)
-	DF	FRA	Léo Schwechlen (to (Cyprus) Anorthosis Famagusta)

=== Valenciennes FC ===
In:

No.	Pos.	Nation	Player

Out:

No.	Pos.	Nation	Player
9	FW	NED	Rydell Poepon (to (Azerbaijan) Qarabağ)
21	FW	FRA	Jean-Luc Dompé (to (Belgium) Sint-Truidense)
—	DF	FRA	Kenny Lala (to Lens)

== See also ==
- 2015–16 Ligue 1
- 2015–16 Ligue 2
