= 2014–15 RC Lens season =

Lens
2014–15 season
- Chairman: Gervais Martel
- Manager: Antoine Kombouaré
- Stadium: Stade de la Licorne (temporary); Stade de France (used vs high profile clubs)
- Ligue 1: 20th (relegated)
- Coupe de France: Round of 64
- Coupe de la Ligue: Round of 32
- Top goalscorer: League: Yoann Touzghar (8); All: Yoann Touzghar (8)
- Highest home attendance: At Stade de la Licorne: 11,228 vs Monaco (26 April 2015); At Stade de France: 70,785 vs Paris Saint-Germain (17 October 2014)
- Lowest home attendance: At Stade de la Licorne: 3,848 vs US Creteil (28 October 2014); At Stade de France: 40,112 vs Lille (7 December 2014)
- Average home league attendance: 17,205
Home colours	Away colours

The 2014–15 RC Lens season was the 109th professional season of the club since its creation in 1906. Lens returned to Ligue 1 after a three-year span in the second division. After their promotion however Lens were considered ineligible for their promotion due to a €10 million payment from shareholder Hafiz Mammadov missing in the accounts. This meant that despite their successes in the previous season, Lens would return to Ligue 2 no matter where they finished in the league. Despite their automatic demotion, the club happened to finish the season in 20th which nevertheless warranted relegation.

The club's stadium Stade Bollaert-Delelis was under renovation for the entirety of the season, ahead of the UEFA Euro 2016 tournament in France. Lens instead played the majority of their matches at Stade de la Licorne in Amiens and played four matches against higher-profile league teams at the French national stadium Stade de France in Saint-Denis.

== Players ==
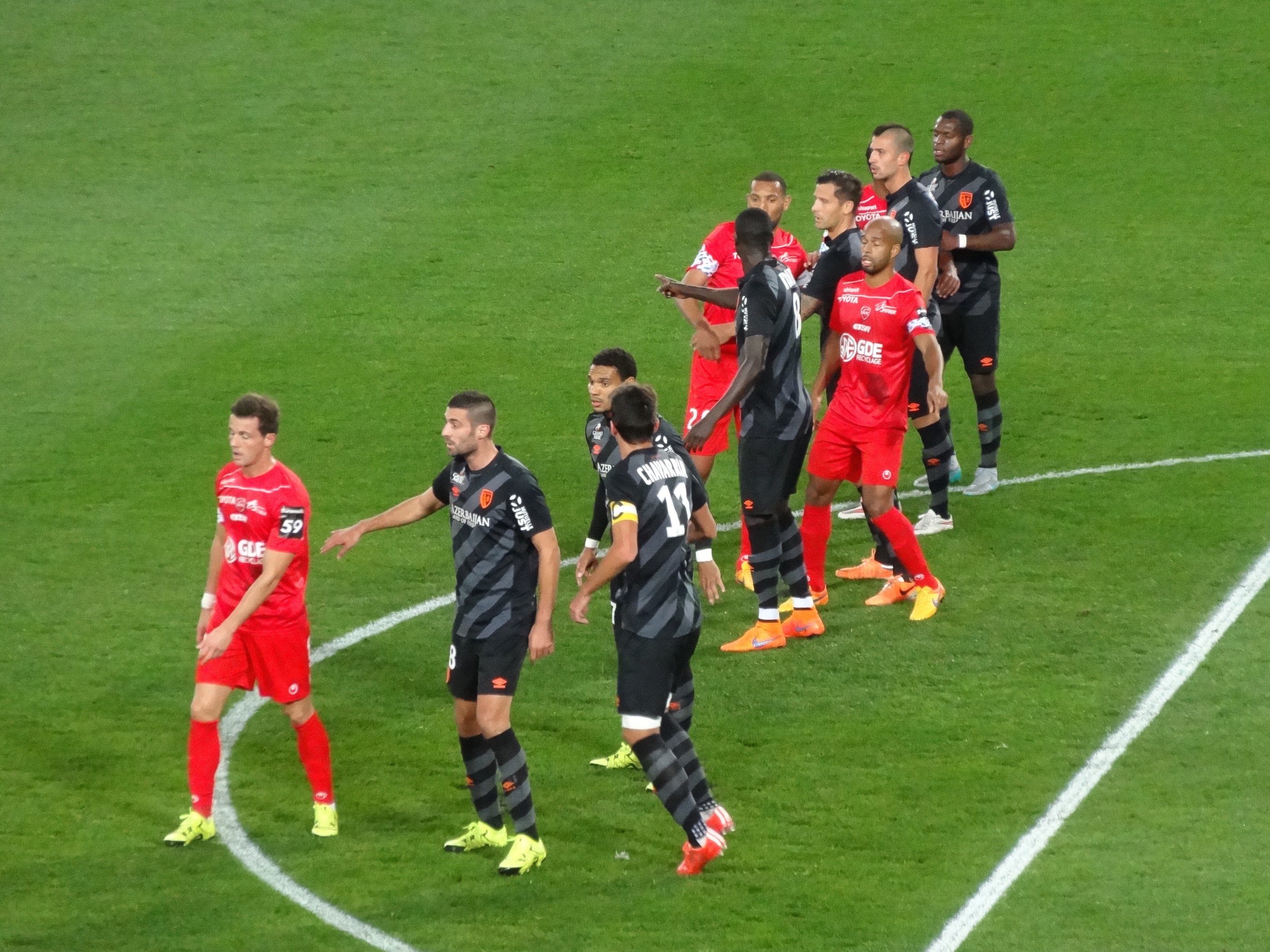
Lens playing away against Valenciennes FC

=== First team squad ===
French teams are limited to four players without EU citizenship. Hence, the squad list includes only the principal nationality of each player; several non-European players on the squad have dual citizenship with an EU country. Also, players from the ACP countries—countries in Africa, the Caribbean, and the Pacific that are signatories to the Cotonou Agreement—are not counted against non-EU quotas due to the Kolpak ruling.

Note: Flags indicate national team as defined under FIFA eligibility rules; some limited exceptions apply. Players may hold more than one non-FIFA nationality.

No.	Pos.	Nation	Player
1	GK	FRA	Rudy Riou
3	DF	FRA	Dimitri Cavaré (on loan from Stade Rennes)
4	DF	MAR	Ahmed Kantari
5	DF	MTN	Abdoul Ba
6	MF	FRA	Jérôme Lemoigne (Captain)
7	FW	FRA	Yoann Touzghar
8	FW	FRA	Aristote Madiani
9	FW	FRA	Adamo Coulibaly
11	FW	ARG	Pablo Chavarria
14	FW	SEN	Deme N'Diaye
15	DF	FRA	Patrick Fradj
18	MF	FRA	Pierrick Valdivia
19	FW	BEL	Baptiste Guillaume
20	MF	MAD	Lalaina Nomenjanahary

No.	Pos.	Nation	Player
21	MF	MAR	Alharbi El Jadeyaoui
22	DF	FRA	Loïck Landre
23	MF	FRA	Wylan Cyprien
24	DF	GUF	Ludovic Baal
25	DF	FRA	Jean-Philippe Gbamin
27	DF	FRA	Benjamin Boulenger
29	MF	FRA	Benjamin Bourigeaud
30	GK	FRA	Samuel Atrous
33	DF	MLI	Boubacar Sylla
34	FW	FRA	El Hadji Malick Seck
35	DF	ENG	Taylor Moore
40	GK	FRA	Valentin Belon
--	DF	FRA	Quentin Lecoeuche

== Competitions ==
=== Ligue 1 ===
==== League table ====
Pos	Team	Pld	W	D	L	GF	GA	GD	Pts	Qualification or relegation
16	Lorient	38	12	7	19	44	50	−6	43	
17	Toulouse	38	12	6	20	43	64	−21	42	
18	Evian (R)	38	11	4	23	41	62	−21	37	Relegation to Ligue 2
19	Metz (R)	38	7	9	22	31	61	−30	30	Relegation to Ligue 2
20	Lens (Note: It was announced on 29 January 2015 that Lens' promotion from Ligue 2 at the end of the 2013–14 season has been ruled invalid, and will thus be automatically relegated to Ligue 2 for the 2015–16 season, regardless of where the team place this season. It has been confirmed by the French Football Federation that the decision of the Administrative Court of Besançon will be appealed.) (D, R)	38	7	8	23	32	61	−29	29	Relegation to Ligue 2

Source: Ligue 1
Rules for classification: 1) points; 2) goal difference; 3) number of goals scored
(D) Disqualified; (R) Relegated

==== Results summary ====
Overall								Home						Away					
Pld	W	D	L	GF	GA	GD	Pts	W	D	L	GF	GA	GD	W	D	L	GF	GA	GD
38	7	8	23	32	61	−29	29	5	4	10	14	24	−10	2	4	13	18	37	−19

Last updated: 13 June 2015.
Source: Competitive matches

==== Results by round ====
Round	1	2	3	4	5	6	7	8	9	10	11	12	13	14	15	16	17	18	19	20	21	22	23	24	25	26	27	28	29	30	31	32	33	34	35	36	37	38
Ground	A	H	A	H	A	H	A	H	A	H	A	A	H	A	H	A	H	A	H	A	H	A	H	A	H	A	H	A	H	H	A	H	A	H	A	H	A	H
Result	L	L	W	W	D	L	L	D	L	L	W	L	L	L	W	L	D	D	W	L	L	D	D	D	L	L	L	L	W	L	L	D	L	L	L	L	L	W
Position	16	18	15	11	9	13	15	14	18	20	16	17	19	20	18	19	18	19	16	19	19	19	19	19	19	19	19	19	19	19	20	19	20	20	20	20	20	20

Source: Ligue1
A = Away; H = Home; W = Win; D = Draw; L = Loss

==== Matches ====
Win Draw Loss

9 August 2014 1	Nantes	1–0	Lens	Nantes
21:00 CEST (UTC+02:00)	Bammou 65'	Report	Bourigeaud (yellow card) 69'	Stadium: Stade de la Beaujoire; Attendance: 27,964; Referee: Sébastien Desiage

16 August 2014 2	Lens	0–1	Guingamp	Amiens
20:00 CEST (UTC+02:00)	Kantari (yellow card) 35'; Valdivia (yellow card) 50'; Chavarria (yellow card) 59'; Lemoigne (yellow card) 79'	Report	Dos Santos (yellow card) 62'; Douniama 90+3'	Stadium: Stade de la Licorne; Attendance: 9,512; Referee: Sébastien Moreira

23 August 2014 3	Lyon	0–1	Lens	Lyon
14:00 CEST (UTC+02:00)	Gonalons (yellow card) 30'	Report	Nomenjanahary 11' (yellow card) 54'; Landre (yellow card) 43'; Cyprien (yellow card) 47'	Stadium: Stade de Gerland; Attendance: 24,636; Referee: Lionel Jaffredo

30 August 2014 4	Lens	4–2	Reims	Amiens
20:00 CEST (UTC+02:00)	Cyprien (yellow card) 27', (goal) 45'; Chavarria 47', (yellow card) 82'; Touzghar 61' (pen.); Coulibaly 87' (pen.)	Report	Mandi 7', (yellow card) 18'; Oniangue (red card) 23'; Signorino (yellow card) 60'; Courtet 80'	Stadium: Stade de la Licorne; Attendance: 9,846; Referee: Benoît Bastien

13 September 2014 5	Bastia	1–1	Lens	Furiani
20:00 CEST (UTC+02:00)	Gillet (yellow card) 47', (goal) 54'	Report	Chavarría 40'; El Jadeyaoui (yellow card) 72'; Lemoigne (yellow card) 77'	Stadium: Stade Armand Cesari; Attendance: 12,474; Referee: Wilfried Bien

21 September 2014 6	Lens	0–1	Saint-Étienne	Amiens
17:00 CEST (UTC+02:00)	Coulibaly (yellow card) 33'; Lemoigne (yellow card) 71'	Report	Mollo (yellow card) 21'; Gradel (yellow card) 78'; Lemoine 82'	Stadium: Stade de la Licorne; Attendance: 11,072; Referee: Saïd Ennjimi

24 September 2014 7	Evian	2–1	Lens	Annecy
19:00 CEST (UTC+02:00)	Wass 10'; Mensah 30'	Report	Touzghar 55'	Stadium: Parc des Sports; Attendance: 9,864; Referee: Frank Schneider

28 September 2014 8	Lens	0–0	Caen	Amiens
17:00 CEST (UTC+02:00)	Valdivia (yellow card) 41'	Report		Stadium: Stade de la Licorne; Attendance: 8,525; Referee: Clément Turpin

4 October 2014 9	Rennes	2–0	Lens	Rennes
20:00 CEST (UTC+02:00)	Diagné (yellow card) 29'; Ntep 54', 84'	Report	Cyprien (yellow card) 61'	Stadium: Stade de la Route de Lorient; Attendance: 18,910; Referee: Sébastien Desiage

17 October 2014 10	Lens	1–3	Paris Saint-Germain	Saint-Denis
20:30 CEST (UTC+02:00)	Coulibaly 10'; Gbamin (yellow card) 9' (yellow-red card) 53'; Lemoigne (yellow card) 27' (yellow-red card) 59'	Report	Cabaye 28'; Maxwell 34'; Cavani 55' (pen.), (yellow card) 56' (yellow-red card) 56'	Stadium: Stade de France; Attendance: 70,785; Referee: Nicolas Rainville

24 October 2014 11	Toulouse	0–2	Lens	Toulouse
20:30 CEST (UTC+02:00)	Grigore (yellow card) 90+2'	Report	El Jadeyaoui 11', (yellow card) 58'; Bourigeaud 27'; Sylla (yellow card) 88'	Stadium: Stadium Municipal; Attendance: 12,105; Referee: Wilfried Bien

2 November 2014 12	Marseille	2–1	Lens	Marseille
16:00 CET (UTC+01:00)	N'Koulou 11'; Romao (yellow card) 23' (yellow-red card) 76'; Thauvin 60'; Mendy (yellow card) 72'; Imbula (yellow card) 81'	Report	Guillaume 31'; Valdivia (yellow card) 79'	Stadium: Stade Vélodrome; Attendance: 52,803; Referee: Bartolomeu Varela

8 November 2014 13	Lens	1–2	Bordeaux	Amiens
17:00 CET (UTC+01:00)	Chavarria (yellow card) 27'; Cyprien (yellow card) 43'; Touzghar 74' (pen.)	Report	Khazri 24'; Diabaté 40'; Touré (yellow card) 50'; Yamberé (yellow card) 68'; Planus (yellow card) 73'	Stadium: Stade de la Licorne; Attendance: 11,037; Referee: Mikael Lesage

22 November 2014 14	Lorient	1–0	Lens	Lorient
20:00 CET (UTC+01:00)	Guerreiro 21'; Ayew (yellow card) 75'	Report	Landre (red card) 15'	Stadium: Stade du Moustoir; Attendance: 13,198; Referee: Amaury Delerue

29 November 2014 15	Lens	2–0	Metz	Amiens
20:00 CET (UTC+01:00)	Kantari (yellow card) 41'; El Jadeyaoui 65'; Bourigeaud 79'	Report	Kashi (yellow card) 40'; Malouda (yellow card) 44'; Maïga (yellow card) 59'	Stadium: Stade de la Licorne; Attendance: 8,922; Referee: Philippe Kalt

2 December 2014 16	Monaco	2–0	Lens	Monaco
21:00 CET (UTC+01:00)	Wallace (red card) 35'; Berbatov 64'; Carrasco 90+3'	Report	Cyprien (yellow card) 59'; Lemoigne (yellow card) 63'	Stadium: Stade Louis II; Attendance: 5,686; Referee: Frank Schneider

7 December 2014 17	Lens	1–1	Lille	Paris
17:00 CET (UTC+01:00)	Kantari (yellow card) 55'; Valdivia (yellow card) 89'; Coulibaly 90+1', (yellow card) 90+2'; Cavaré (yellow card) 90+4'	Report	Gueye 47', (yellow card) 86'	Stadium: Stade de France; Attendance: 40,112; Referee: Ruddy Buquet

13 December 2014 18	Montpellier	3–3	Lens	Montpellier
20:00 CET (UTC+01:00)	Sanson 1'; Barrios 16'; Saihi (yellow card) 50'; Mounier 63', (yellow card) 63'	Report	Valdivia 18'; Sylla (yellow card) 33'; Guillaume 34'; Bourigeaud (yellow card) 56'; Touzghar 80'	Stadium: Altrad Stadium; Attendance: 9,784; Referee: Saïd Ennjimi

19 December 2014 19	Lens	2–0	Nice	Amiens
20:30 CET (UTC+01:00)	Sylla (yellow card) 26'; Cyprien 38'; Lemoigne (yellow card) 72'; Valdivia (yellow card) 73'; Coulibaly 86'	Report	Eysseric (yellow card) 18'; Puel (yellow card) 39'	Stadium: Stade de la Licorne; Attendance: 8,705; Referee: Sébastien Desiage

10 January 2015 20	Guingamp	2–0	Lens	Guingamp
20:00 CET (UTC+01:00)	Mandanne 17'; Sankharé (yellow card) 61'; Beauvue 76' (pen.)	Report	El Jadeyaoui (yellow card) 49'; Valdivia (yellow card) 71'; Sylla (yellow card) 85'	Stadium: Stade du Roudourou; Attendance: 13,520; Referee: Clément Turpin

17 January 2015 21	Lens	0–2	Lyon	Amiens
17:00 CET (UTC+01:00)		Report	Gbamin 22' (o.g.); Lacazette 26' (pen.)	Stadium: Stade de la Licorne; Attendance: 11,173; Referee: Amaury Delerue

25 January 2015 22	Reims	0–0	Lens	Reims
17:00 CET (UTC+01:00)	Bourillon (yellow card) 12'; Tacalfred (yellow card) 36'	Report	Cyprien (yellow card) 17'	Stadium: Stade Auguste Delaune; Attendance: 13,813; Referee: Lionel Jaffredo

31 January 2015 23	Lens	1–1	Bastia	Amiens
20:00 CET (UTC+01:00)	Kantari 80' (pen.); Bourigeaud (yellow card) 87'	Report	Boudebouz 62' (pen.); Squillaci (yellow card) 79'; Romaric (yellow card) 80'	Stadium: Stade de la Licorne; Attendance: 7,985; Referee: Alexandre Castro

6 February 2015 24	Saint-Étienne	3–3	Lens	Saint-Étienne
20:30 CET (UTC+01:00)	N'Guémo 18'; Baysse (yellow card) 27'; Mollo 57'; Hamouma (yellow card) 71'; Erdinç 83'; Lemoine (yellow card) 88'	Summary	Touzghar 60', 69' (pen.); Kantari (yellow card) 72'; Chavarría 77'; Valdivia (yellow card) 88'	Stadium: Stade Geoffroy-Guichard; Attendance: 31,974; Referee: Olivier Thual

14 February 2015 25	Lens	0–2	Evian	Amiens
20:00 CET (UTC+01:00)	Baal (yellow card) 43' (yellow-red card) 90+2'	Report	Duhamel 19', 35'; Sabaly (yellow card) 61'; Abdallah (yellow card) 67'; Wass (red card) 90+2'	Stadium: Stade de la Licorne; Attendance: 7,899; Referee: Ruddy Buquet

21 February 2015 26	Caen	4–1	Lens	Caen
20:00 CET (UTC+01:00)	Féret 7' (pen.); Sala 35', 75'; Bazile 36'; Imorou (yellow card) 38'	Report	El Jadeyaoui 45'; Coulibaly (yellow card) 59'; Valdivia (yellow card) 74'	Stadium: Stade Michel d'Ornano; Attendance: 17,751; Referee: Tony Chapron

28 February 2015 27	Lens	0–1	Rennes	Amiens
20:00 CET (UTC+01:00)	Kantari (yellow card) 62'; Guillaume (yellow card) 69'; El Jadeyaoui (yellow card) 90+1'	Report	Doucouré 36'; Habibou (yellow card) 90'	Stadium: Stade de la Licorne; Attendance: 7,549; Referee: Benoît Millot

7 March 2015 28	Paris Saint-Germain	4–1	Lens	Paris
17:00 CET (UTC+01:00)	David Luiz 44', (yellow card) 90+2'; Ibrahimović 60' (pen.); Matuidi 80'; Pastore 83'	Report	Baal (yellow card) 31'; Nomenjanahary (yellow card) 43'; Touzghar 68'; Gbamin (yellow card) 72'	Stadium: Parc des Princes; Attendance: 46,279; Referee: Wilfried Bien

14 March 2015 29	Lens	1–0	Toulouse	Amiens
20:00 CET (UTC+01:00)	Nomenjanahary (yellow card) 66'; Chavarria 77'; Landre (yellow card) 90'	Report	Grigore (yellow card) 68'	Stadium: Stade de la Licorne; Attendance: 7,494; Referee: Sébastien Desiage

22 March 2015 30	Lens	0–4	Marseille	Saint-Denis
21:00 CET (UTC+01:00)	Valdivia (yellow card) 11'; Gbamin (yellow card) 35'; Lemoigne (yellow card) 66'	Report	Dja Djédjé (yellow card) 22'; Batshuayi 46', 67', 90+3'; Ayew 72'; Imbula (yellow card) 90'	Stadium: Stade de France; Attendance: 70,122; Referee: Fredy Fautrel

4 April 2015 31	Bordeaux	2–1	Lens	Bordeaux
14:00 CEST (UTC+02:00)	Contento (yellow card) 42'; Mariano 80'; Maurice-Belay 90+3'	Report	Chavarria (yellow card) 62', (goal) 86'; Coulibaly (yellow card) 63'	Stadium: Stade Chaban-Delmas; Attendance: 22,407; Referee: Philippe Kalt

12 April 2015 32	Lens	0–0	Lorient	Amiens
17:00 CEST (UTC+02:00)	Madiani (yellow card) 59'; Valdivia (yellow card) 76'; Cyprien (yellow card) 90+4'	Report	Mostefa (yellow card) 69'	Stadium: Stade de la Licorne; Attendance: 7,468; Referee: Sébastien Moreira

18 April 2015 33	Metz	3–1	Lens	Metz
20:00 CEST (UTC+02:00)	Malouda 13'; Bussmann (yellow card) 25'; Sarr 57' (pen.); Maïga 79'	Report	Gbamin (yellow card) 44'; Cyprien (yellow card) 77'; Madiani 89'	Stadium: Stade Saint-Symphorien; Attendance: 16,875; Referee: Frank Schneider

26 April 2015 34	Lens	0–3	Monaco	Amiens
17:00 CEST (UTC+02:00)	Lemoigne (yellow card) 18'; Valdivia (yellow card) 57'; El Jadeyaoui (yellow card) 69'	Report	Fabinho (yellow card) 24'; Carrasco 36'; Martial 44'; Silva 72'	Stadium: Stade de la Licorne; Attendance: 11,228; Referee: Bartolomeu Varela

3 May 2015 35	Lille	3–1	Lens	Villeneuve-d'Ascq
14:00 CEST (UTC+02:00)	Gueye (yellow card) 14'; Boufal 41' (pen.), (yellow card) 79'; Kjær (yellow card) 69'; Sidibé 74'; Origi 90+4'	Report	Chavarria 24'; Touzghar (yellow card) 28'; Landre (yellow card) 40'; Kantari (yellow card) 81'	Stadium: Stade Pierre-Mauroy; Attendance: 41,435; Referee: Tony Chapron

10 May 2015 36	Lens	0–1	Montpellier	Amiens
14:00 CEST (UTC+02:00)	Landre (yellow card) 55' (yellow-red card) 65'	Report	Martin (yellow card) 58'; Tiéné (yellow card) 86'; Mounier 90+2'	Stadium: Stade de la Licorne; Attendance: 8,343; Referee: Mikael Lesage

16 May 2015 37	Nice	2–1	Lens	Nice
21:00 CEST (UTC+02:00)	Amavi 29'; Bodmer (yellow card) 45'; Digard 77'	Report	Touzghar 14'; Cyprien (yellow card) 16'	Stadium: Allianz Riviera; Attendance: 20,185; Referee: Nicolas Rainville

23 May 2015 38	Lens	1–0	Nantes	Amiens
21:00 CEST (UTC+02:00)	Chavarria 5'; Moore (yellow card) 30'; Landre (yellow card) 47'	Report	Deaux (yellow card) 37'; Veretout (yellow card) 90+2'	Stadium: Stade de la Licorne; Attendance: 9,123; Referee: Sébastien Moreira

=== Coupe de la Ligue ===
28 October 2014 Round of 32	Lens	0–2	US Créteil	Amiens
20:00 CEST (UTC+02:00)		Report	Lesage 58', (yellow card) 74'; Esor (yellow card) 60'; Seck (yellow card) 84'; Genest 87'	Stadium: Stade de la Licorne; Attendance: 3,848; Referee: Alexandre Castro

=== Coupe de France ===
4 January 2015 Round of 64	Lens	2–3	Lyon	Amiens
14:15 CET (UTC+01:00)	Lemoigne (yellow card) 21'; Guillaume (yellow card) 26'; El Jadeyaoui 76' (pen.); Coulibaly 90'	Report	Fekir 5'; Lacazette 14' (pen.); Dabo 30'; Tolisso (yellow card) 34'	Stadium: Stade de la Licorne; Referee: Fredy Fautrel
