= Belon (disambiguation) =

Belon or Belón may refer to:

- Riec-sur-Bélon, a commune in the Finistère department of Brittany, France
- Estadio E. Torres Belón, a multi-purpose stadium in Puno, Peru
- María Belón (born 1966), Spanish physician and motivational speaker
- Pierre Belon (1517–1564), French traveller, naturalist, writer and diplomat
- Pierre Belon Lapisse (1762–1809), French military personnel
- Valentin Belon (born 1995), French footballer
- Wojciech Belon (1952–1985), Polish poet, songwriter and folksinger

== See also ==
- Belon'i Tsiribihina, a town and commune in Madagascar
- Belon'i Tsiribihina (district), a district in Menabe, Madagascar
