= Aristote Madiani =

French footballer (born 1995)

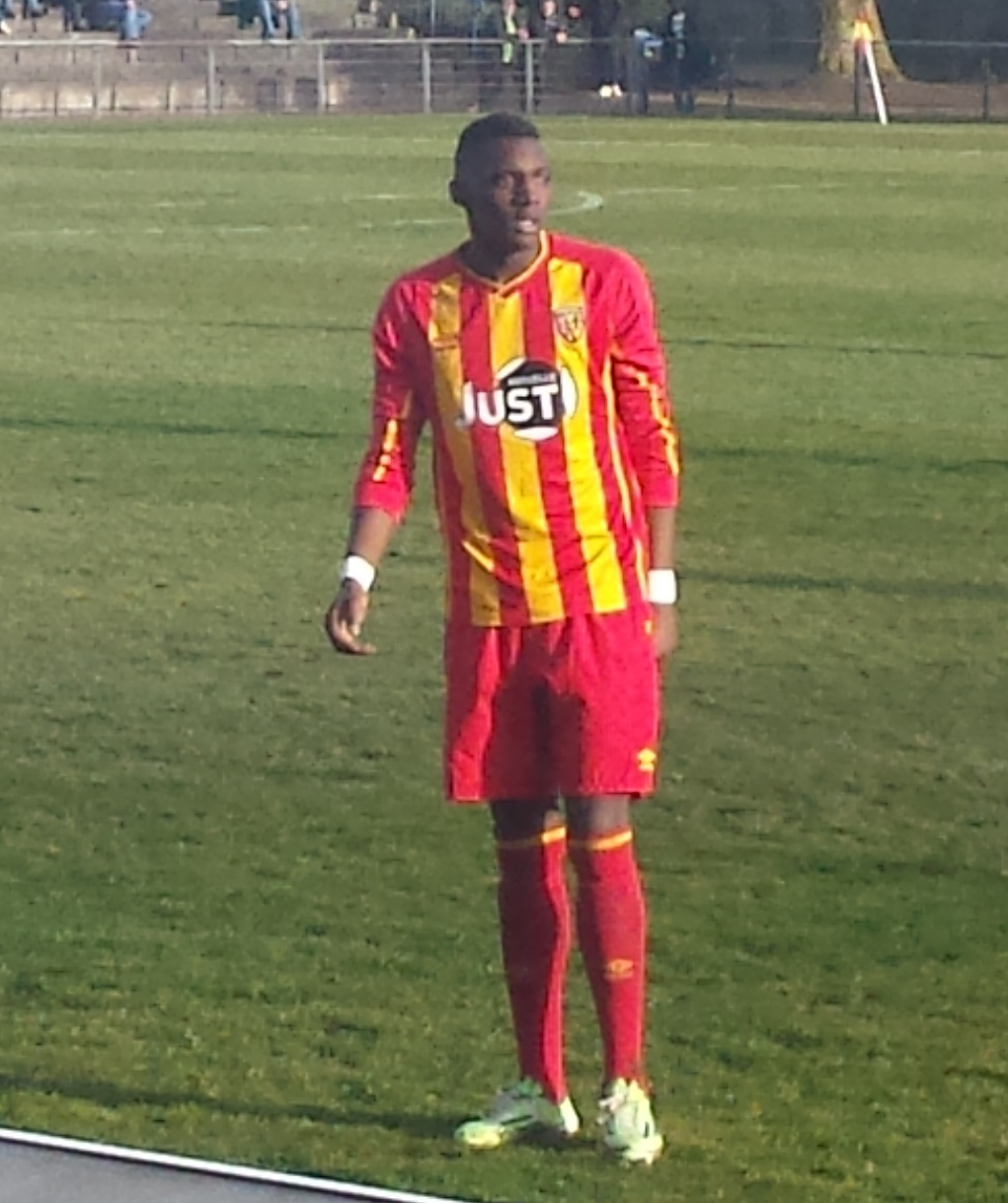
- Madiani in march 2015.

Personal information
- Full name: Aristote Madiani
- Date of birth: 22 August 1995 (age 31)
- Place of birth: La Ferté-sous-Jouarre, France
- Height: 1.85 m (6 ft 1 in)
- Position: Winger

Team information
- Current team: La Louvière Centre

Youth career
- 2010–2014: Lens

Senior career*
Years	Team	Apps	(Gls)
2014–2017	Lens	21	(1)
2016–2017	→ Paris FC (loan)	20	(0)
2017–2018	Quevilly-Rouen	13	(0)
2018–2019	Trikala	1	(0)
2020	Vitosha Bistritsa	1	(0)
2021–2022	IC Croix	15	(0)
2023–2024	FC Blo-Wäiss Medernach		
2024–2025	FC Nueillaubiers		
2025–	La Louvière Centre		

International career
2012	France U18	1	(0)
2015	France U20	2	(0)
- * Club domestic league appearances and goals as of 1 February 2020

Aristote Madiani (born 22 August 1995) is a French footballer who plays as a winger for Belgian Division 2 club La Louvière Centre.

== Club career ==
Madiani is a youth exponent from Lens. He made his Ligue 1 debut at 7 December 2014 against Lille, replacing Boubacar Sylla after 79 minutes in a 1–1 home draw.

On 29 July 2016, it was announced that Madiani would join Paris FC on a season-long loan.

On 14 January 2025, Madiani signed for La Louvière Centre.

== Personal life ==
Madiani is of Congolese descent.

== Career statistics ==
As of end of 2018–19 season

Appearances and goals by club, season and competition
Club	Season	League			Cup		Other		Total	
Club	Season	Division	Apps	Goals	Apps	Goals	Apps	Goals	Apps	Goals
Lens	2014–15	Ligue 1	16	1	0	0	—		16	1
Lens	2015–16	Ligue 2	13	0	1	0	—		14	0
Lens	2016–17	Ligue 2	0	0	0	0	—		0	0
Lens	Total		29	1	1	0	—		30	1
Paris (loan)	2016–17	Championnat National	20	0	3	0	—		23	0
Quevilly-Rouen	2017–18	Ligue 2	13	0	1	0	—		14	0
Trikala	2018–19	Football League	1	0	1	0	—		2	0
Career total			63	1	6	0	0	0	69	1
