= Xavier Lenogue =

Martiniquais footballer (born 1996)

Personal information
- Date of birth: 27 December 1996 (age 29)
- Place of birth: Fort-de-France, Martinique, France
- Height: 1.94 m (6 ft 4 in)
- Position: Goalkeeper

Team information
- Current team: Boulogne
- Number: 1

Youth career
- Auxerre

Senior career*
Years	Team	Apps	(Gls)
2013–2017	Auxerre B	51	(0)
2016–2017	Auxerre	1	(0)
2017–2018	Pau	0	(0)
2017–2018	Pau B	5	(0)
2018–2019	Saint-Pryvé	20	(0)
2019–2023	Sedan	14	(0)
2023–	Boulogne	26	(0)

International career^{‡}
2026–	Martinique	2	(0)
- * Club domestic league appearances and goals as of 12 May 2026 ‡ National team caps and goals as of 28 September 2026

Xavier Lenogue (born 27 December 1996) is a Martiniquais professional footballer who plays as a goalkeeper for Ligue 2 club Boulogne and the Martinique national team.

== Club career ==
Lenogue made his professional debut with Auxerre in a 0–0 draw against Brest.

== International career ==
In March 2022, Lenogue was selected with the Martinique national team.

On 25 September 2026, Lenogue made his debut for the Martinique national team in a 2026–27 CONCACAF Nations League A game against El Salvador.
