= Pierrick Valdivia =

French footballer (born 1988)

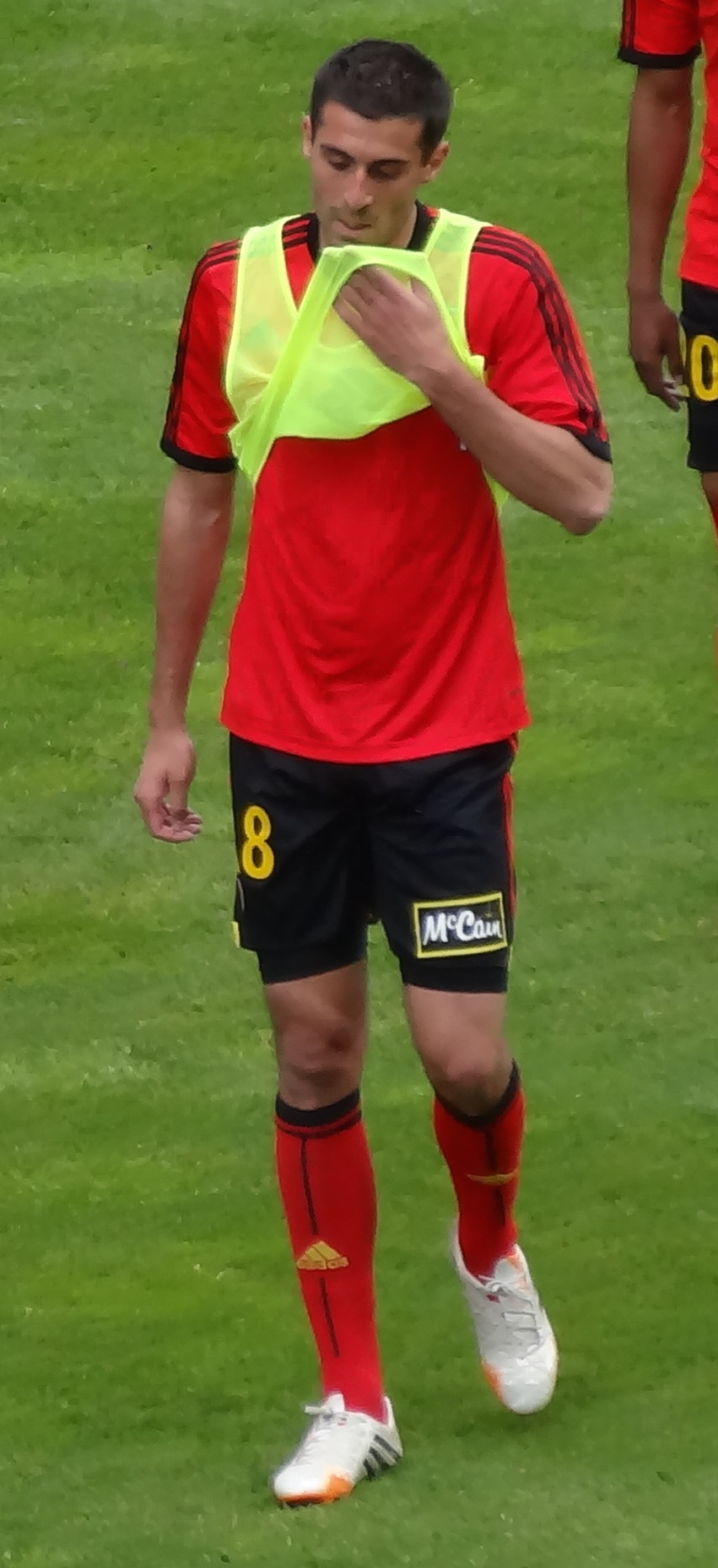

Personal information
- Date of birth: 18 April 1988 (age 38)
- Place of birth: Bron, France
- Height: 1.85 m (6 ft 1 in)
- Position: Midfielder

Youth career
- 1995–2000: Saint-Priest
- 2000–2008: Lyon

Senior career*
Years	Team	Apps	(Gls)
2008–2009	Lyon	0	(0)
2009–2012	Sedan	93	(6)
2012–2016	Lens	112	(15)
2016–2017	Sint-Truidense	13	(0)
2017–2019	Nîmes	34	(0)
2019–2021	Guingamp	21	(0)
- * Club domestic league appearances and goals as of 5 December 2020

Pierrick Valdivia (born 18 April 1988) is a French professional footballer. A former graduate of the Olympique Lyonnais academy, he plays as a midfielder.

== Club career ==
=== Early career ===
Pierrick began his career with amateur side AS Saint-Priest. After a couple of years at the club, Olympique Lyonnais began inquiring for his services. However, after adhering to the advice of his father, Pierrick decided to remain at Saint-Priest for a few more years. Eventually, he moved to Lyon and quickly ascending the ranks in the youth system. Following the 2007–08 season, he signed his first professional contract agreeing to a one-year deal. He was officially promoted to the senior squad for the 2008–09 season and assigned the number 13 shirt.

Though promoted, Pierrick spent the entire season playing in the Championnat de France amateur where he regularly impressed. He appeared in 26 matches scoring 6 goals, which included a hat trick against CA Bastia and a brace against his former club AS Saint-Priest. His impressive play helped the Lyon Reserves finish 1st among professional clubs in their group and also win the entire competition in the playoffs. Unfortunately, due to Lyon's midfield already engulfed with talent, he didn't make one appearance with the professional squad.

=== Sedan ===
Following the expiration of his contract, Pierrick looked for other destinations. He was linked to Ligue 1 club FC Lorient before signing with CS Sedan Ardennes on 9 June 2009 agreeing to a three-year deal. He made his debut for the club on 1 August 2009 in a Coupe de la Ligue match coming on as a substitute in the 90th minute. He play the full extra time session picking up a yellow card in the 108th minute as Sedan won 2–0.

=== Lens ===
In July 2012, Valdivia joined Ligue 2 side RC Lens on a three-year contract.

=== Sint-Truidense ===
In June 2016, it was announced that Valdivia had agreed a three-year contract with Belgian side Sint-Truidense V.V.

== Personal life ==
Valdivia is of Spanish descent, and is a fan of FC Barcelona.
