= Karim Djellabi =

French footballer (born 1983)

Personal information
- Full name: Karim Djellabi
- Date of birth: 31 May 1983 (age 43)
- Place of birth: Épinay-sur-Seine, France
- Height: 1.70 m (5 ft 7 in)
- Position: Left-back

Youth career
- 1994–2002: Angers

Senior career*
Years	Team	Apps	(Gls)
2002–2012	Angers	266	(1)
2013	Nantes	6	(0)
2013–2015	Auxerre	53	(0)
2015–2018	Clermont	67	(0)
Total		392	(1)
- * Club domestic league appearances and goals

Karim Djellabi (born 31 May 1983) is a French former professional footballer who played as a midfielder. Having been formed as a left-winger, he played mainly as left-back.

== Personal life ==
Karim Djellabi was born in Épinay-sur-Seine, in the northern suburbs of Paris. He holds both French and Algerian nationalities.

== Career ==
In summer 2015, Djellabi joined Clermont Foot on a two-year contract.
