= Rayan Frikeche =

Moroccan footballer (born 1991)

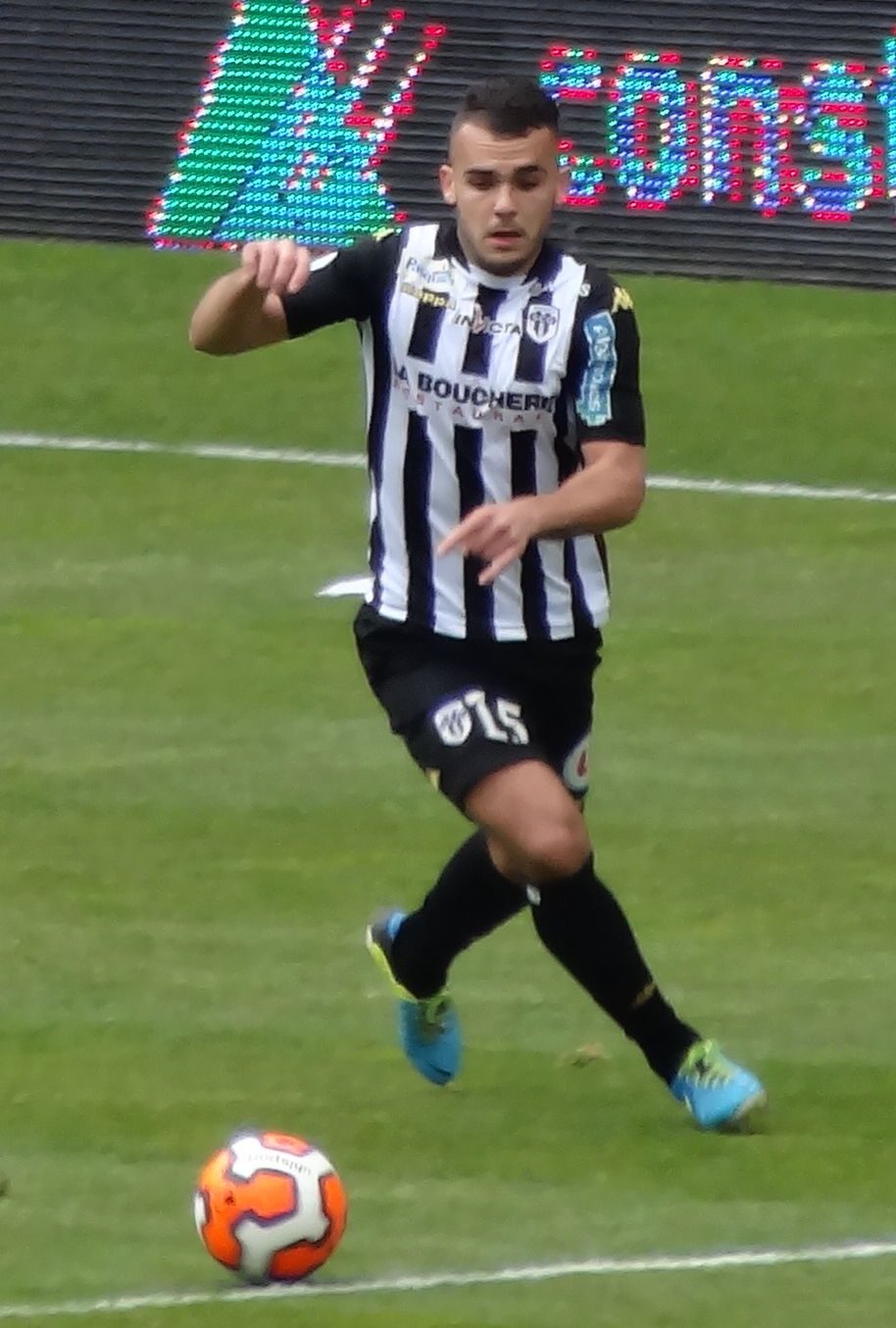

Personal information
- Date of birth: 9 October 1991 (age 35)
- Place of birth: Angers, France
- Height: 1.84 m (6 ft 0 in)
- Position: Defensive midfielder

Team information
- Current team: Wasquehal
- Number: 4

Senior career*
Years	Team	Apps	(Gls)
2011–2015	Angers	98	(10)
2014–2015	Angers B	8	(0)
2015–2017	Ajaccio	51	(1)
2016–2017	Ajaccio B	2	(0)
2017	Lokomotiv Plovdiv	7	(0)
2018	Boulogne B	3	(0)
2018–2022	Boulogne	118	(7)
2023	Sète 34	9	(0)
2023–	Wasquehal	16	(5)

International career
2012	Morocco U23	3	(1)
- * Club domestic league appearances and goals as of 18 May 2024

Rayan Frikeche (born 9 October 1991) is a professional footballer who plays as a defensive midfielder for Championnat National 1 club Wasquehal.

== Early life ==
Frikece was born and raised in Angers to a French mother and a Moroccan father.

== Club career ==
Frikeche started his career with Angers SCO, playing almost 100 Ligue 2 matches before signing for AC Ajaccio in June 2016.

On 27 September 2017, Frikeche signed with Bulgarian club Lokomotiv Plovdiv for 1 1/2 years.

In July 2018, Frikeche returned to France with Championnat National side Boulogne.

== International career ==
Frikeche made his debut for the Morocco national under-23 football team at the 2012 Toulon Tournament on 24 May 2012, in a 4–3 defeat against Mexico national under-23 football team. He was then called up to the squad for the 2012 Olympics.
