= Florian Fabre =

French footballer (born 1987)

Personal information
- Date of birth: 4 February 1987 (age 39)
- Place of birth: Nîmes, France
- Height: 1.74 m (5 ft 8 1/2 in)
- Position: Central midfielder

Team information
- Current team: Pays d'Uzès

Senior career*
Years	Team	Apps	(Gls)
2010–2014	Uzès Pont du Gard	85	(5)
2014–2015	Gazélec Ajaccio	38	(4)
2015–2017	Nîmes	40	(1)
2017–2018	Bastia-Borgo	25	(0)
2018–2019	Tours	19	(1)
2019–	Pays d'Uzès		
- * Club domestic league appearances and goals as of 2 May 2019

Florian Fabre (born 4 February 1987) is a French professional footballer who plays as a midfielder for an amateur side Pays d'Uzès.

== Club career ==
After years in the French lower divisions, Fabre joined Gazélec Ajaccio in January 2014, while the club was in the third division. He made his professional debut in a Ligue 2 victory over Valenciennes in August 2014.

Gazélec Ajaccio gained promotion to Ligue 1 at the end of the 2014–15 season. Fabre however moved on a free transfer to Nîmes Olympique in Ligue 2.
