= Morgan Kamin =

French footballer (born 1994)

Personal information
- Full name: Morgan Kamin
- Date of birth: 23 January 1994 (age 32)
- Place of birth: Saint-Raphaël, France
- Height: 1.75 m (5 ft 9 in)
- Position: Midfielder

Team information
- Current team: FC Foron

Senior career*
Years	Team	Apps	(Gls)
2012–2015	Monaco B	42	(4)
2015–2016	Evian B	2	(0)
2015–2016	Evian	21	(2)
2016–2017	Louhans-Cuiseaux	17	(2)
2017–2018	SC Toulon	19	(2)
2018–2020	Annecy	25	(4)
2020–	Thonon Évian	0	(0)
- * Club domestic league appearances and goals as of 14 July 2020 (UTC)

Morgan Kamin (born 23 January 1994) is a French footballer who plays as a midfielder for Thonon Évian.

== Career statistics ==
As of match played 20 January 2018

Appearances and goals by club, season and competition
Club	Season	League			National Cup		League Cup		Other		Total	
Club	Season	Division	Apps	Goals	Apps	Goals	Apps	Goals	Apps	Goals	Apps	Goals
Monaco II	2012–13	CFA	1	0	—		—		—		1	0
Monaco II	2013–14	CFA	21	2	—		—		—		21	2
Monaco II	2014–15	CFA	20	2	—		—		—		20	2
Monaco II	Total		42	4	—		—		0	0	42	4
Évian TG II	2015–16	CFA 2	2	0	—		—		—		2	0
Évian TG	2015–16	Ligue 2	21	2	1	1	1	0	—		23	3
Louhans-Cuiseaux	2016–17	CFA 2	17	2	2	0	—		—		19	2
Toulon	2017–18	National 2	12	2	0	0	—		—		12	2
Career total			94	10	3	1	1	0	0	0	98	11
