= Rudy Riou =

French footballer (born 1980)

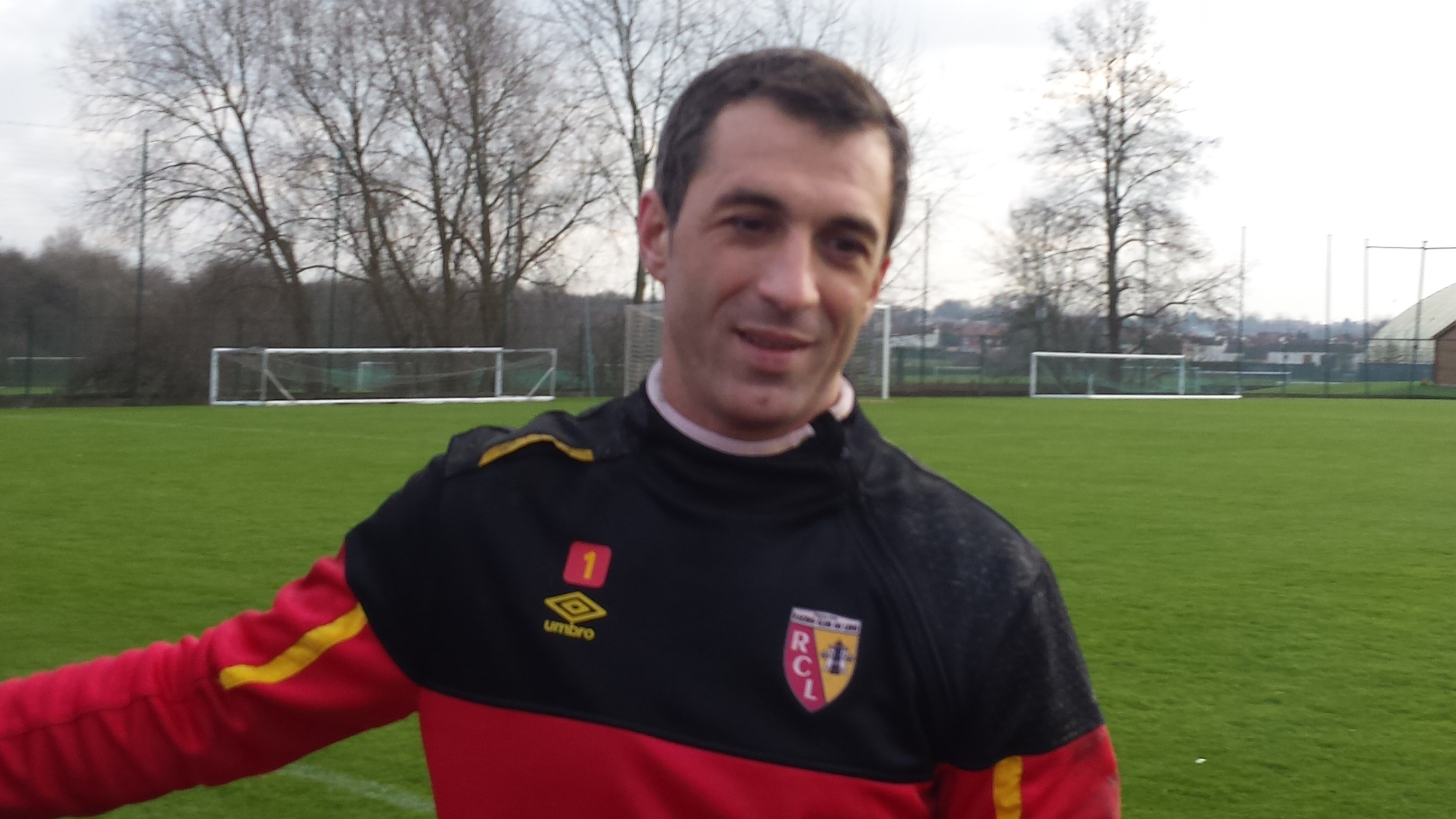
- Riou in 2014

Personal information
- Date of birth: 22 January 1980 (age 46)
- Place of birth: Béziers, France
- Height: 1.85 m (6 ft 1 in)
- Position: Goalkeeper

Team information
- Current team: Toulouse (goalkeeper coach)

Senior career*
| Years | Team | Apps | (Gls) |
| 1999–2004 | Montpellier | 116 | (0) |
| 2004–2007 | Istres | 101 | (0) |
| 2007–2008 | Toulouse | 3 | (0) |
| 2008–2011 | Marseille | 1 | (0) |
| 2011 | Charleroi | 11 | (0) |
| 2011–2012 | Nantes | 33 | (0) |
| 2012–2015 | Lens | 73 | (0) |
| 2015–2016 | OH Leuven | 29 | (0) |
| Total | | 367 | (0) |

Managerial career
- 2016–2018: Fréjus Saint-Raphaël (assistant)
- * Club domestic league appearances and goals

Rudy Riou (born 22 January 1980) is a French former professional footballer who played as a goalkeeper. He is the goalkeeper coach of Toulouse FC.

== Career ==
=== Montpellier ===
Riou made his Ligue 1 début on 31 July 1999, being a key figure in a 2–1 victory over Olympique Lyonnais. He played 20 games for Montpellier before they were relegated. He signed his first professional contract in 2000.

In Ligue 2 he played 18 games and participated in the club's promotion back to Ligue 1. He then spent three seasons in Ligue 1 but at the end of the 2003–04 season he left Montpellier, who were once again relegated to Ligue 2.

=== Istres and Toulouse ===
In 2004 Riou agreed to sign for FC Istres, who were newly promoted to Ligue 1. He remained with FC Istres for three years before they were relegated to National. Riou then went on to sign for Toulouse FC, but rarely featured.

=== Marseille ===
At the beginning of the 2008–2009 season, he moved to Olympique de Marseille to cover for Steve Mandanda, with Cedric Carrasso in turn moving in the opposite direction to Toulouse.

On 29 October 2008, he made his first appearance for the club, replacing Steve Mandanda due to a thigh injury at halftime against Nantes. The match ended 1–1.

=== Charleroi ===
In January 2011 he signed a six-month contract with Sporting Charleroi after being released by Marseille.

=== Nantes ===
After a short spell at Charleroi, Riou signed a three-year contract with FC Nantes on 20 July 2011.

=== OH Leuven ===
In July 2015, free agent Riou signed for OH Leuven. He left the club at the end of season following their relegation to the Belgian First Division B.

== Coaching career ==
After retiring in the summer 2016, Riou immediately started his coaching career at Étoile Fréjus Saint-Raphaël where he was appointed assistant manager to Charles Paquille.

In October 2018 Riou was appointed goalkeeper's coach for the Gabon national team by manager Daniel Cousin. He left the position in March 2019. In October 2019, he was appointed goalkeeper coach under manager Antoine Kombouaré at Toulouse FC.

== Career statistics ==
Appearances and goals by club, season and competition
| Club | Season | League | | | National Cup | | League Cup | | Europe | | Other | | Total | |
| Club | Season | Division | Apps | Goals | Apps | Goals | Apps | Goals | Apps | Goals | Apps | Goals | Apps | Goals |
|---|---|---|---|---|---|---|---|---|---|---|---|---|---|---|
| Montpellier | 1998–99 | Ligue 1 | 0 | 0 | 0 | 0 | 0 | 0 | — | | — | | 0 | 0 |
| Montpellier | 1999–2000 | Ligue 1 | 20 | 0 | 0 | 0 | 1 | 0 | 3 | 0 | — | | 25 | 0 |
| Montpellier | 2000–01 | Ligue 2 | 18 | 0 | 0 | 0 | 0 | 0 | — | | — | | 18 | 0 |
| Montpellier | 2001–02 | Ligue 1 | 19 | 0 | 0 | 0 | 0 | 0 | — | | — | | 19 | 0 |
| Montpellier | 2002–03 | Ligue 1 | 28 | 0 | 0 | 0 | 1 | 0 | — | | — | | 29 | 0 |
| Montpellier | 2003–04 | Ligue 1 | 31 | 0 | 0 | 0 | 1 | 0 | — | | — | | 32 | 0 |
| Montpellier | Total | | 116 | 0 | 0 | 0 | 3 | 0 | 3 | 0 | — | | 122 | 0 |
| Istres | 2004–05 | Ligue 2 | 26 | 0 | 1 | 0 | 0 | 0 | — | | — | | 27 | 0 |
| Istres | 2005–06 | Ligue 2 | 37 | 0 | 1 | 0 | 1 | 0 | — | | — | | 39 | 0 |
| Istres | 2006–07 | Ligue 2 | 38 | 0 | 0 | 0 | 2 | 0 | — | | — | | 40 | 0 |
| Istres | Total | | 101 | 0 | 2 | 0 | 3 | 0 | — | | — | | 106 | 0 |
| Toulouse | 2007–08 | Ligue 1 | 3 | 0 | 0 | 0 | 1 | 0 | 1 | 0 | — | | 5 | 0 |
| Marseille | 2008–09 | Ligue 1 | 1 | 0 | 0 | 0 | 0 | 0 | 0 | 0 | — | | 1 | 0 |
| Marseille | 2009–10 | Ligue 1 | 0 | 0 | 0 | 0 | 0 | 0 | 0 | 0 | — | | 0 | 0 |
| Marseille | 2010–11 | Ligue 1 | 0 | 0 | 0 | 0 | 0 | 0 | 0 | 0 | 0 | 0 | 0 | 0 |
| Marseille | Total | | 1 | 0 | 0 | 0 | 0 | 0 | 0 | 0 | 0 | 0 | 1 | 0 |
| Charleroi | 2010–11 | Belgian Pro League | 11 | 0 | — | | — | | — | | — | | 11 | 0 |
| Nantes | 2011–12 | Ligue 2 | 33 | 0 | 0 | 0 | 1 | 0 | — | | — | | 34 | 0 |
| Lens | 2012–13 | Ligue 2 | 37 | 0 | 6 | 0 | 1 | 0 | — | | — | | 44 | 0 |
| Lens | 2013–14 | Ligue 2 | 4 | 0 | 5 | 0 | 2 | 0 | — | | — | | 11 | 0 |
| Lens | 2014–15 | Ligue 1 | 32 | 0 | 1 | 0 | 0 | 0 | — | | — | | 33 | 0 |
| Lens | Total | | 73 | 0 | 12 | 0 | 3 | 0 | — | | — | | 88 | 0 |
| OH Leuven | 2015–16 | Belgian Pro League | 29 | 0 | 2 | 0 | — | | — | | — | | 31 | 0 |
| Career total | | | 367 | 0 | 16 | 0 | 11 | 0 | 4 | 0 | 0 | 0 | 398 | 0 |

== Honours ==
Montpellier

- UEFA Intertoto Cup: 1999
