= Ludovic Baal =

French Guianan footballer (born 1986)

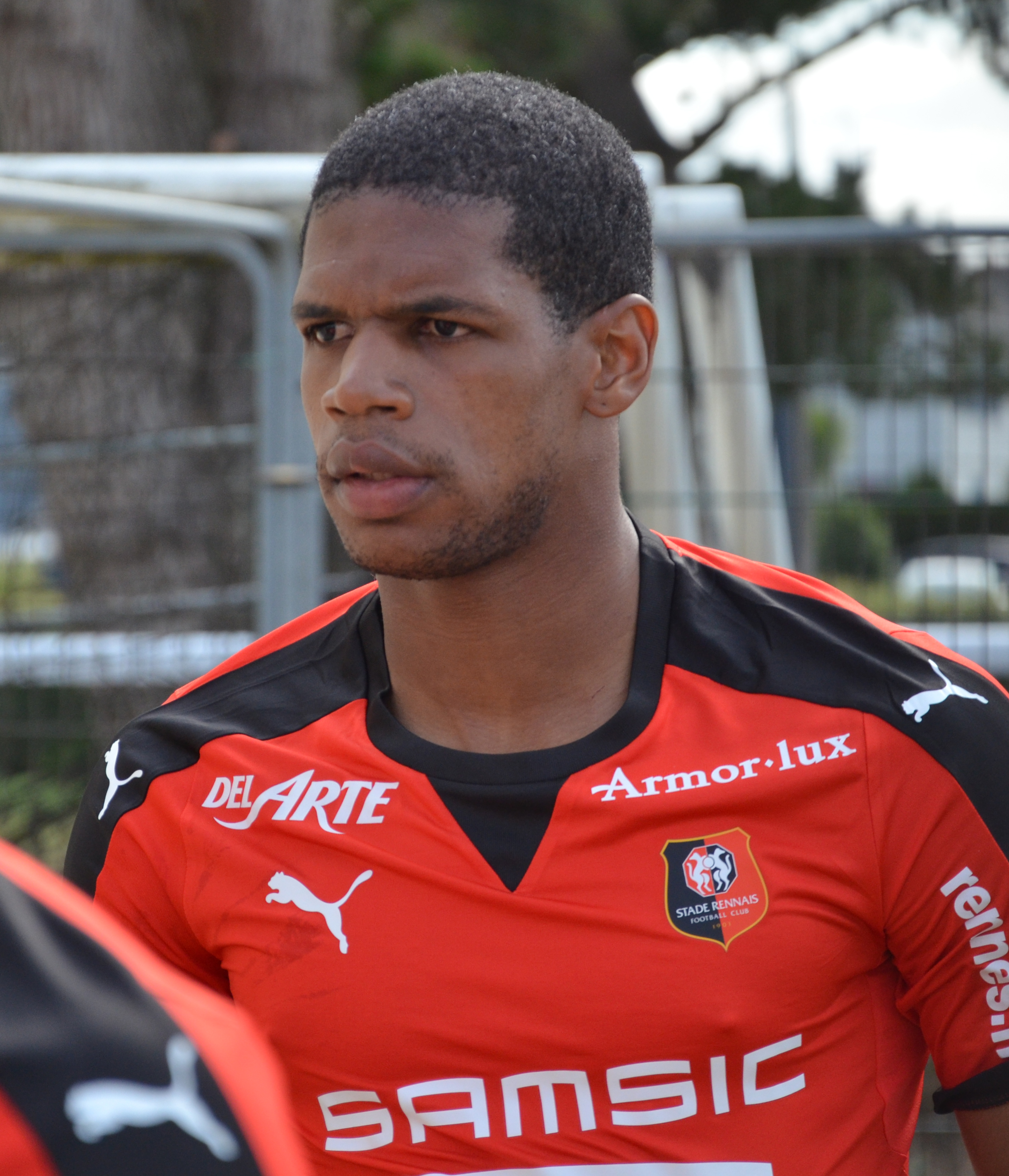
- Baal in 2015

Personal information
- Date of birth: 24 May 1986 (age 40)
- Place of birth: Cayenne, French Guiana, France
- Height: 1.76 m (5 ft 9 in)
- Position: Left-back

Senior career*
Years	Team	Apps	(Gls)
2005–2008	Le Mans B	74	(11)
2007–2011	Le Mans	102	(3)
2011–2015	Lens	130	(2)
2015–2019	Rennes	74	(0)
2016–2019	Rennes B	5	(0)
2019–2021	Brest	18	(0)
2022	Concarneau	11	(0)

International career^{‡}
2012–	French Guiana	32	(3)
- * Club domestic league appearances and goals as of 13 May 2022 ‡ National team caps and goals as of 10 December 2022

Ludovic Baal (born 24 May 1986) is a French Guianan professional footballer who plays as a left-back for the French Guiana team.

== Club career ==
Baal moved from Le Mans to Lens on 10 June 2011. On 12 June 2015, he joined Rennes on a three-year contract. On 1 August 2019, Baal joined Brest. On 14 January 2022, he signed for Concarneau.

== Career statistics ==
=== Club ===
As of 13 May 2022

Appearances and goals by club, season and competition
Club	Season	League			National Cup		League Cup		Other		Total	
Club	Season	Division	Apps	Goals	Apps	Goals	Apps	Goals	Apps	Goals	Apps	Goals
Le Mans	2007–08	Ligue 1	12	1	0	0	0	0	—		12	1
Le Mans	2008–09	Ligue 1	15	0	0	0	0	0	—		15	0
Le Mans	2009–10	Ligue 1	38	0	0	0	1	0	—		39	0
Le Mans	2010–11	Ligue 2	37	2	4	0	1	0	—		42	2
Le Mans	Total		102	3	4	0	2	0	—		108	3
Lens	2011–12	Ligue 2	33	1	0	0	4	1	—		37	2
Lens	2012–13	Ligue 2	33	0	5	0	1	0	—		39	0
Lens	2013–14	Ligue 2	37	1	2	0	2	0	—		41	1
Lens	2014–15	Ligue 1	27	0	1	0	0	0	—		28	0
Lens	Total		130	2	8	0	7	1	—		145	3
Rennes	2015–16	Ligue 1	22	0	0	0	1	0	—		23	0
Rennes	2016–17	Ligue 1	33	0	1	0	1	0	—		35	0
Rennes	2017–18	Ligue 1	17	0	0	0	3	0	—		20	0
Rennes	2018–19	Ligue 1	2	0	0	0	0	0	1 (Note: Appearance in the UEFA Europa League)	0	3	0
Rennes	Total		74	0	1	0	5	0	1	0	81	0
Rennes B	2015–16	CFA 2	1	0	—		—		—		1	0
Rennes B	2017–18	National 2	1	0	—		—		—		1	0
Rennes B	2018–19	National 3	3	0	—		—		—		3	0
Rennes B	Total		5	0	—		—		—		5	0
Brest	2019–20	Ligue 1	11	0	0	0	0	0	—		11	0
Brest	2020–21	Ligue 1	7	0	2	0	—		—		9	0
Brest	Total		18	0	2	0	0	0	—		20	0
Concarneau	2021–22	National	11	0	0	0	—		—		11	0
Career total			340	5	15	0	14	1	1	0	370	6

=== International goals ===
Scores and results list French Guiana's goal tally first.

No	Date	Venue	Opponent	Score	Result	Competition
1.	12 October 2012	Warner Park Sporting Complex, Basseterre, Saint Kitts and Nevis	Anguilla	4–1	4–1	2012 Caribbean Cup qualification
2.	29 March 2016	Stade Municipal Dr. Edmard Lama, Remire-Montjoly, French Guiana	Cuba	1–0	3–0	2017 Caribbean Cup qualification
3.	9 November 2016	Stade Sylvio Cator, Port-au-Prince, Haiti	Haiti	5–2	5–2	2017 Caribbean Cup qualification
