= Florent Perraud =

French footballer (born 1982)

Personal information
- Date of birth: 11 June 1982 (age 44)
- Place of birth: Rillieux-la-Pape, France
- Height: 1.82 m (5 ft 11 1/2 in)
- Position: Goalkeeper

Senior career*
Years	Team	Apps	(Gls)
1998–2004	Saint-Étienne B		
2003–2004	→ Valenciennes (loan)	1	(0)
2004–2009	Dijon	37	(0)
2007–2008	→ Libourne (loan)	12	(0)
2009–2010	FC Gueugnon	17	(0)
2010–2011	SR Colmar	22	(0)
2011–2013	Sedan	26	(0)
2012	Sedan B	3	(0)
2013–2015	Dijon	8	(0)
2013–2015	Dijon B	8	(0)
- * Club domestic league appearances and goals as of 20 May 2015

Florent Perraud (born 11 June 1982) is a French professional footballer.

Perraud played at the professional level in Ligue 2 for Dijon FCO, Libourne and Sedan.
