= Ahmed Kantari =

Moroccan footballer (born 1985)

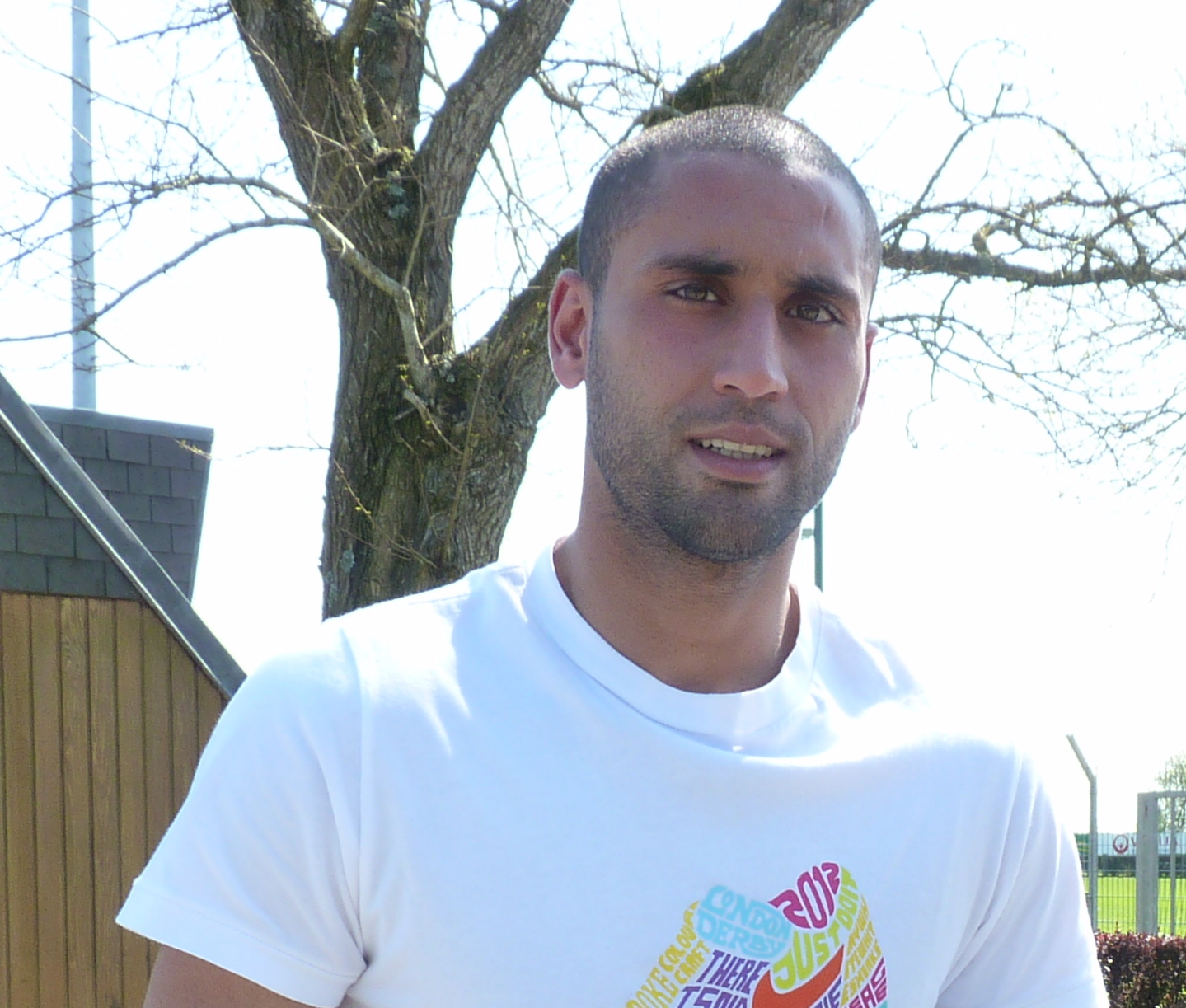
- Kantari in 2010

Personal information
- Date of birth: 28 June 1985 (age 41)
- Place of birth: Blois, France
- Height: 1.85 m (6 ft 1 in)
- Position: Centre-back

Youth career
- Blois Football 41
- Paris Saint-Germain

Senior career*
Years	Team	Apps	(Gls)
2005–2006	Paris Saint-Germain	0	(0)
2006–2008	Strasbourg	8	(0)
2007–2008	→ Brest (loan)	17	(0)
2008–2013	Brest	134	(4)
2013–2015	Lens	59	(2)
2015	Toronto FC	12	(0)
2016–2019	Valenciennes	40	(0)
Total		270	(6)

International career
2005–2006	Morocco U20	1	(0)
2005–2014	Morocco	16	(0)

Managerial career
- 2022–2023: Valenciennes B
- 2023–2024: Valenciennes
- 2025–2026: Nantes
- * Club domestic league appearances and goals

Ahmed Kantari (born 28 June 1985) is a professional football coach and a former player who played as a centre-back. Born in France, he represented Morocco at international level.

== Club career ==
After a ten-year career playing in France with various clubs, Kantari signed with Toronto FC in Major League Soccer.

He was released by Toronto on 13 January 2016.

In late January 2019, at the age of 33, Kantari ended his professional career.

== International career ==
Kantari played for Morocco participating in the 2012 Africa Cup of Nations qualification.

== Coaching career ==
On 26 November 2024, Valenciennes announced that Kantari was suspended as head coach of the club.

On 10 December 2025, he became head coach of Nantes.
