= Alharbi El Jadeyaoui =

French footballer (born 1986)

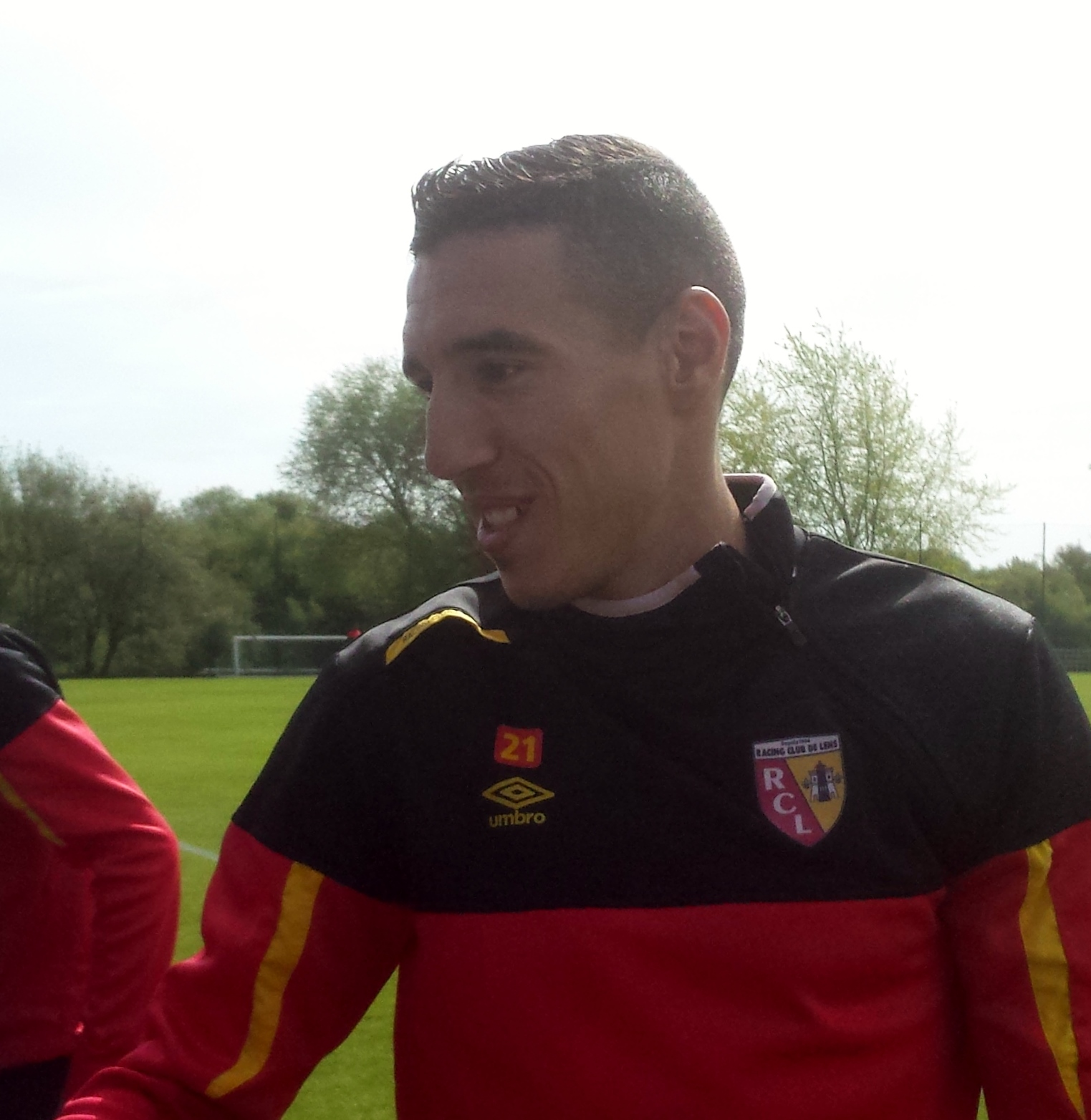
- Alharbi playing for Lens in 2014

Personal information
- Date of birth: 8 August 1986 (age 40)
- Place of birth: Strasbourg, France
- Height: 1.85 m (6 ft 1 in)
- Position: Left winger

Youth career
- AS Beauvais

Senior career*
| Years | Team | Apps | (Gls) |
| 2002–2004 | AS Beauvais | 0 | (0) |
| 2004–2005 | Tours | 8 | (0) |
| 2005–2008 | Châteauroux | 68 | (6) |
| 2008–2009 | Brest | 31 | (6) |
| 2009–2012 | Guingamp | 62 | (7) |
| 2012–2014 | Angers | 42 | (4) |
| 2014–2015 | Lens | 35 | (4) |
| 2015–2016 | Qarabağ | 10 | (1) |
| 2017 | Ratchaburi Mitr Phol | 30 | (5) |
| 2018–2019 | Grenoble | 28 | (0) |
| 2020 | SV Linx | 1 | (0) |

International career
| 2007 | France U20 | 1 | (0) |
| 2013 | Morocco | 1 | (0) |
- * Club domestic league appearances and goals as of 21:54, 23 October 2020 (UTC)

Alharbi El Jadeyaoui (born 8 August 1986) is a footballer who played as a left winger. Born in France, he represented Morocco at international level.

== Career ==
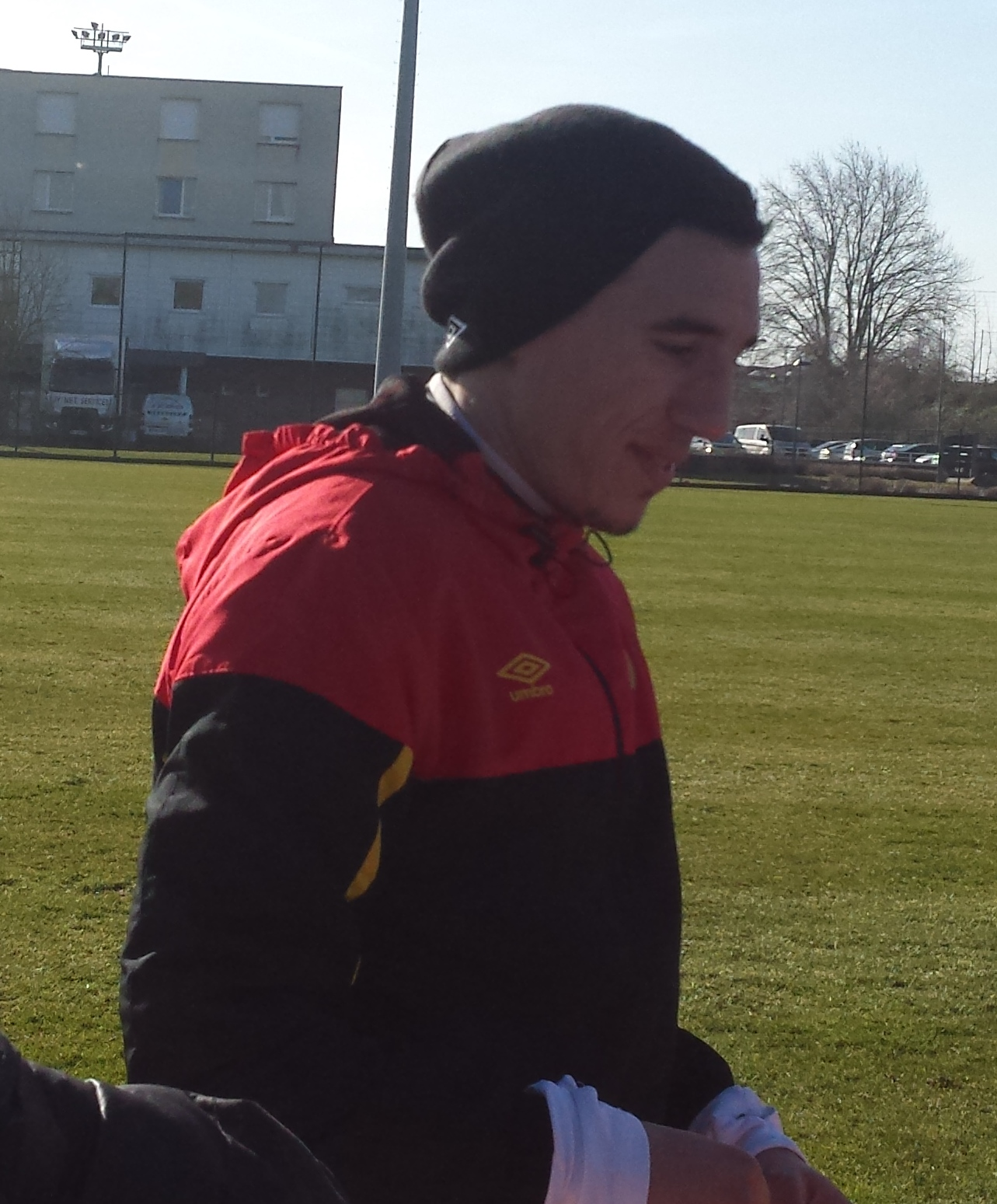
El Jadeyaoui with RC Lens.

El Jadeyaoui was born in Strasbourg.

On 13 July 2009, it was announced by Sky Sports that El-Jadeyaoui had joined English Premier League side Blackburn Rovers for a one-week trial. On 20 July 2009, Guingamp signed the attacking midfielder from Stade Brest on a four-year deal. On 7 August 2013, it was announced that El-Jadeyaoui had joined English Premier League side Arsenal F.C. on a two-day trial.

On 22 January 2014, it was announced that El-Jadeyaoui signed a two-year contract for Ligue 2 side RC Lens.

In June 2015, El-Jadeyaoui moved to Azerbaijan Premier League Champions FK Qarabağ, signing a two-year contract.

On 5 January 2018, El-Jadeyaoui joined Championnat National side Grenoble. In the 2018–19 season, he played only 430 minutes of play in the league (including four starts) and on 25 July 2019 he announced the "end of his adventure" with the Grenoble.

In January 2020, he joined German Oberliga Baden-Württemberg club SV Linx.

== International career ==
El Jadeyaoui was born in France to parents of Moroccan descent. He originally played for France U20 in the 2007 Toulon Tournament. He was then formally capped by Morocco national football team in a 2–1 win over Tanzania on 8 June 2013.

== Career statistics ==
As of match played 11 February 2017

Appearances and goals by club, season and competition
| Club | Season | League | | | National Cup | | League Cup | | Continental | | Other | | Total | |
| Club | Season | Division | Apps | Goals | Apps | Goals | Apps | Goals | Apps | Goals | Apps | Goals | Apps | Goals |
|---|---|---|---|---|---|---|---|---|---|---|---|---|---|---|
| Guingamp | 2009–10 | Ligue 2 | 27 | 2 | | | | | 1 | 0 | 1 | 0 | 29 | 2 |
| Guingamp | 2010–11 | Championnat National | 22 | 5 | 1 | 1 | 2 | 0 | - | | - | | 8 | 0 |
| Guingamp | 2011–12 | Ligue 2 | 12 | 0 | 1 | 0 | 2 | 1 | - | | - | | 8 | 0 |
| Guingamp | Total | | 61 | 7 | 2 | 1 | 4 | 1 | 1 | 0 | 1 | 0 | 69 | 9 |
| Angers | 2012–13 | Ligue 2 | 35 | 4 | 1 | 0 | 2 | 0 | - | | - | | 38 | 4 |
| Angers | 2013–14 | Ligue 2 | 7 | 0 | 1 | 0 | 0 | 0 | - | | - | | 8 | 0 |
| Angers | Total | | 42 | 4 | 2 | 0 | 1 | 0 | - | - | - | - | 45 | 4 |
| Lens | 2013–14 | Ligue 2 | 9 | 1 | 0 | 0 | 0 | 0 | - | | - | | 9 | 1 |
| Lens | 2014–15 | Ligue 1 | 26 | 3 | 1 | 0 | 1 | 0 | - | | - | | 28 | 3 |
| Lens | Total | | 35 | 4 | 1 | 0 | 1 | 0 | - | - | - | - | 37 | 4 |
| Qarabağ | 2015–16 | APL | 9 | 0 | 1 | 0 | - | | 9 | 0 | 0 | 0 | 19 | 0 |
| Qarabağ | 2016–17 | APL | 1 | 1 | 0 | 0 | - | | 1 | 0 | 0 | 0 | 2 | 1 |
| Qarabağ | Total | | 10 | 1 | 1 | 0 | - | - | 10 | 0 | 0 | 0 | 21 | 1 |
| Ratchaburi Mitr Phol | 2017 | Thai Premier League | 5 | 1 | 0 | 0 | - | | - | | - | | 5 | 1 |
| Career total | | | 149 | 16 | 6 | 1 | 6 | 1 | 11 | 0 | 1 | 0 | 173 | 18 |

== Honours ==
Qarabağ FK

- Azerbaijan Premier League (1): 2015–16
- Azerbaijan Cup: (1) 2015–16
