= Boubacar Sylla =

Malian footballer

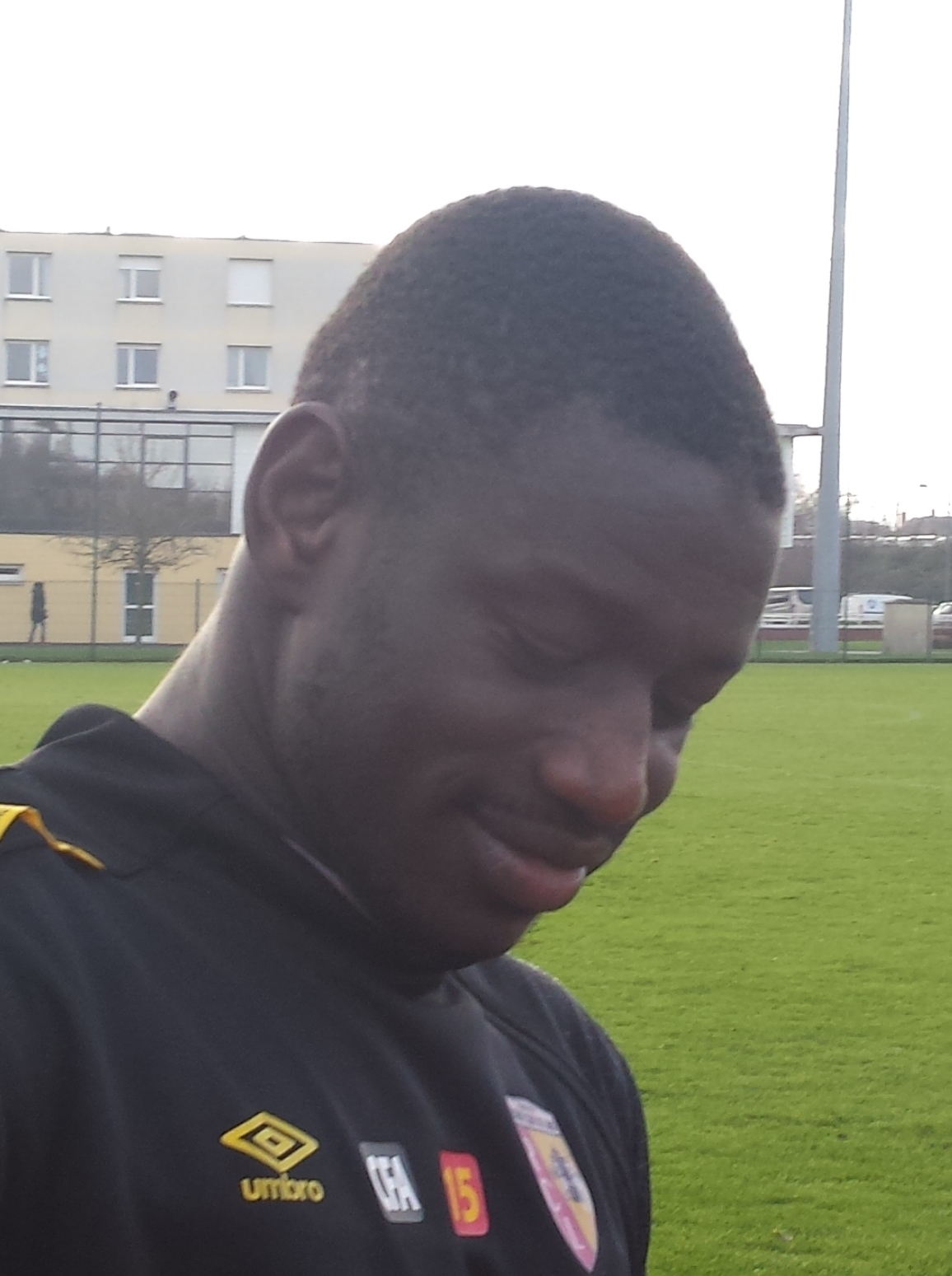
- Sylla in 2014

Personal information
- Date of birth: 17 April 1991 (age 35)
- Place of birth: Bamako, Mali
- Height: 1.77 m (5 ft 10 in)
- Position: Left back

Youth career
- AS Kanu

Senior career*
Years	Team	Apps	(Gls)
2008–2009	Stade Malien	?	(?)
2009–2012	Châteauroux B	19	(0)
2010–2012	Châteauroux	5	(0)
2012	→ Cherbourg (loan)	11	(0)
2012–2014	Lens B	35	(0)
2014–2015	Lens	7	(0)

International career
2011	Mali U20	6	(0)
2014	Mali	1	(1)
- * Club domestic league appearances and goals

Boubacar Sylla (born 17 April 1991) is a Malian former professional footballer who played as a left-back.

== Career ==
Sylla started his career in his home city of Bamako with Stade Malien during the 2008–09 season.

He joined French Ligue 2 side Châteauroux in the summer of 2009, but mostly featured in the reserve side during his first two seasons at the club. He made his professional debut in the 1–0 win against Sedan on 20 May 2011, and kept his place in the team for the following match away at Istres. He went on to make three further first-team appearances during the first half of the 2011–12 season.

On 30 January 2012, it was announced that Sylla had joined Championnat National side Cherbourg on a six-month loan deal, along with Jonathan Kodjia of Reims. Sylla indicated that he hoped to gain from the experience of playing at a lower level.

In September 2012 Sylla joined to the reserve team of Lens. During the 2012–13 CFA season he played in twelve games for RC Lens B. On 10 October 2013, Sylla signed a professional two-year contract with Lens.
