= Valentin Belon =

French professional footballer (born 1995)

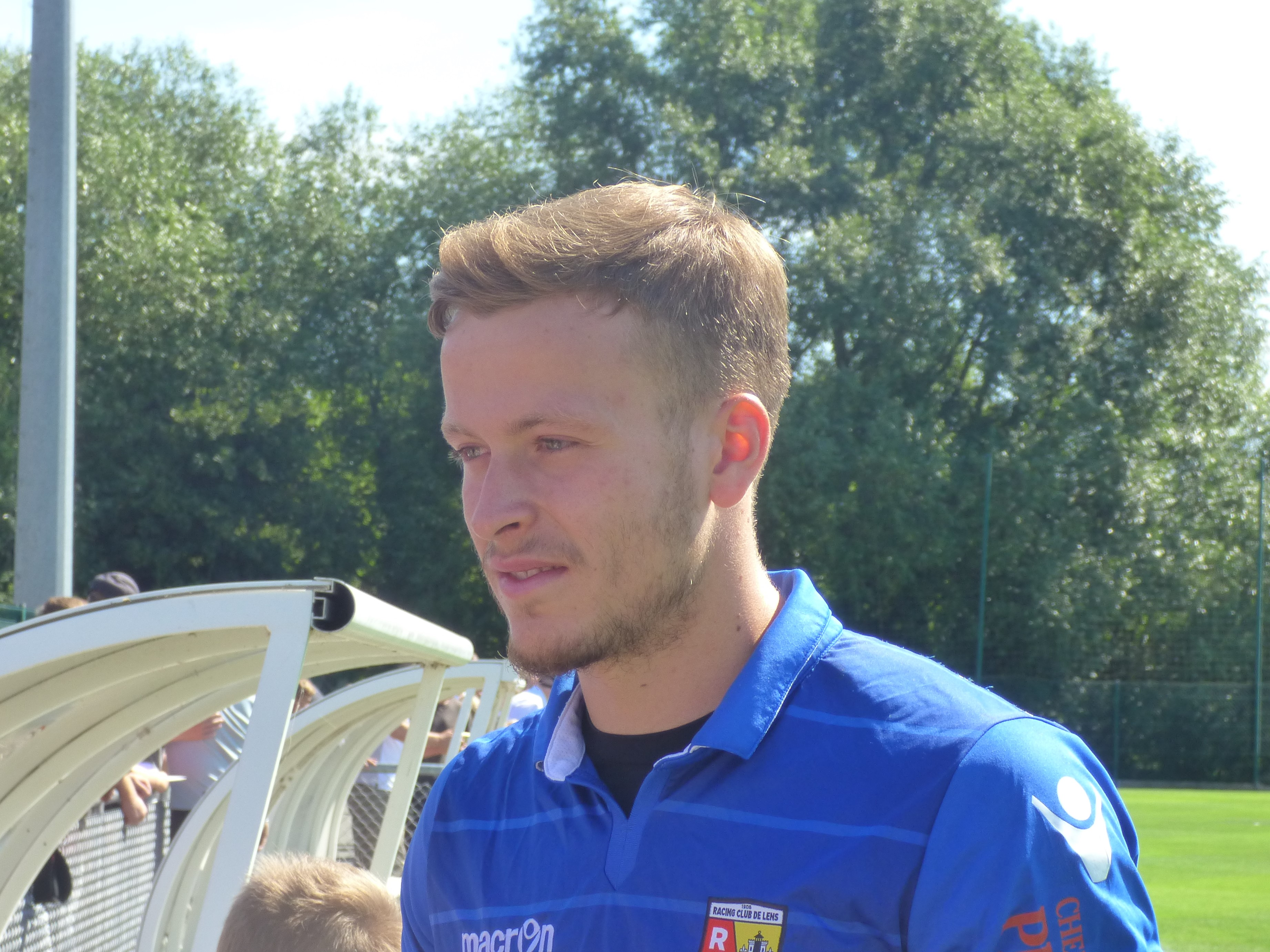
- Belon in 2018

Personal information
- Full name: Valentin Belon
- Date of birth: 5 July 1995 (age 31)
- Place of birth: Béthune, France
- Height: 1.80 m (5 ft 11 in)
- Position: Goalkeeper

Youth career
- –2014: Lens

Senior career*
Years	Team	Apps	(Gls)
2013–2019	Lens II	52	(0)
2014–2021	Lens	9	(0)
2019–2021	→ Laval (loan)	9	(0)
2019–2020	→ Laval II (loan)	5	(0)
- * Club domestic league appearances and goals as of 14:10, 13 August 2021 (UTC)

Valentin Belon (born 5 July 1995) is a French professional footballer who most recently played as a goalkeeper for Ligue 1 club RC Lens. After leaving RC Lens in July 2021, Belon did not join another professional club and later worked in dog training and canine behaviour in Bouches-du-Rhône.

== Club career ==
Belon is a youth exponent from RC Lens. He made his debut for the club on 24 October 2014, in a 2–0 victory against Toulouse. In July 2019 he joined Laval on a season-long loan.
