= 2016–17 Ligue 2 =

78th season of the second-tier football league in France

Ligue 2
- Season: 2016–17
- Champions: Strasbourg
- Promoted: Strasbourg; Amiens; Troyes
- Relegated: Red Star; Laval
- Matches: 380
- Goals: 903 (2.38 per match)
- Top goalscorer: 23 goals Adama Niane, Troyes
- All statistics correct as of 12:59, 25 May 2017 (UTC).

The 2016–17 Ligue 2 (referred to as the Domino's Ligue 2 for sponsorship reasons) season is the 78th season since its establishment. The fixtures were announced on 6 June 2016.

== Teams ==
There are 20 teams in the league, with three promoted teams from Championnat National replacing the three teams that were relegated from Ligue 2 following the 2015–16 season. All clubs that secured Ligue 2 status for the season were subject to approval by the DNCG before becoming eligible to participate.

As of 30 May 2016, the following teams have mathematically achieved qualification for the 2016–17 season. They are listed below in alphabetical order.

- Ajaccio
- Amiens
- Auxerre
- Bourg-en-Bresse
- Brest
- Clermont
- Gazélec Ajaccio
- Laval
- Le Havre
- Lens
- Nîmes
- Niort
- Orléans
- Red Star
- Reims
- Sochaux
- Strasbourg
- Tours
- Troyes
- Valenciennes

== Title & Promotion run ==
Going into the final day of the season, 6 teams had a chance of getting promoted and winning the title. Strasbourg, Brest, Troyes, Lens, Nîmes and Amiens all had a chance at winning the league and gaining promotion.

=== Title run-in ===
All matches were at the same time. The matches were Strasbourg v. Bourg Péronnas, Reims v. Amiens, Nimes v. Laval, Lens v. Niort, Brest v. GFC Ajaccio and Troyes v. Sochaux.

=== The teams last season in Ligue 1 ===
Strasbourg last played in the 2008, Nimes in 1993, Lens in 2015, ESTAC Troyes in 2016 and Brest in 2013. Amiens is still the only team of the five others who never completes the top-tier.

=== Table ===
Pos	Team	Pld	W	D	L	GF	GA	GD	Pts	Promotion or Relegation
1	Strasbourg (Y)	37	18	10	9	61	46	+15	64	Promotion to Ligue 1
2	Amiens (Y)	37	18	9	10	54	37	+17	63	Promotion to Ligue 1
3	Troyes (Y)	37	18	9	10	56	41	+15	63	Qualification to promotion play-offs
4	Lens (Y)	37	17	11	9	57	39	+18	62	
5	Brest (Y)	37	18	8	11	52	42	+10	62	
6	Nîmes (Y)	37	16	13	8	56	39	+17	61	

Source: Ligue 2
Rules for classification: 1) Points; 2) Goal difference; 3) Number of goals scored; 4) Head-to-head goal difference; 5) Fair play points
(Y) Assured of promotion play-offs, but may still get promoted automatically.

=== First Half ===
Lens scored the first goal thanks to Kermit Erasmus against Niort in the 7th minute and climb to the first place. Later, Aboubakar Kamara opened the scoring for Amiens in the 9th minute and took the first place to Lens, Cristian Lopez scored the 2–0 lead for Lens in the 15th minute. At the same time, Kader Mangane opened the scoring for Strasbourg and climb to the first place they will keep permanently. On the 18th minute, an own goal of Bourg-en-Bresse defender Kévin Hoggas will granting a 2–0 lead for the Alsacian club. On 23rd and 40th minutes respectively, Florent Ogier and Florian Tardieu scored goals against Troyes. Earlier, Brest scored three goals in the span of six minutes, which dropped Troyes to fifth place. Yoane Wissa scored for Laval to make it 1-0.

=== As It Stands in Half Time ===
Pos	Team	Pld	W	D	L	GF	GA	GD	Pts	Promotion or Relegation
1	Strasbourg (C, P)	38	19	10	9	63	46	+17	67	Promotion to Ligue 1
2	Amiens (P)	38	19	9	10	55	37	+18	66	Promotion to Ligue 1
3	Lens (Q)	38	18	11	9	59	39	+20	65	Qualification to promotion play-offs
4	Brest	38	19	8	11	55	42	+13	65	
5	Troyes	38	18	9	11	56	43	+13	63	
6	Nîmes	38	16	13	9	56	40	+16	61	

Source: Ligue 2
Rules for classification: 1) Points; 2) Goal difference; 3) Number of goals scored; 4) Head-to-head goal difference; 5) Fair play points
(C) Champions; (P) Promoted; (Q) Qualified for the phase indicated

=== Second Half ===
On the 52nd minute, Olivier Kemen scored for GFC Ajaccio. Sada Thioub scored the equalizer-goal for Reims in the 57th minute. One minute later, Andé Dona Ndoh reduced the score for Niort via a penalty. Two minutes later, Stéphane Darbion reduced the score for Troyes. Two minutes later, Diego Rigonato scored the equalizer-goal for Reims and dropped Amiens to the fourth place, granting a promotion play-off. Habib Diallo scored earlier for Brest following by a goal of Cristian Battocchio in the 72nd minute. Cristian Battocchio scored two goals in the 72nd and 85th minutes respectively. Benjamin Nivet scored the equalizer goal in the 77th minute. On the 87th minute, Téji Tedy Savanier scored the winning goal for Nimes, but Samuel Grandsir scored a vital goal for Troyes that could secure promotion and dropped Lens to promotion play-off. Cristian López scored another goal to Lens in the stoppage time.

=== Last seconds table ===
Pos	Team	Pld	W	D	L	GF	GA	GD	Pts	Promotion or Relegation
1	Strasbourg (C, P)	38	19	10	9	63	47	+16	67	Promotion to Ligue 1
2	Troyes (Y)	38	19	9	10	59	43	+16	66	Promotion to Ligue 1
3	Lens (Y)	38	18	11	9	59	40	+19	65	Qualification to promotion play-offs
4	Brest (Y)	38	19	8	11	58	44	+14	65	
5	Nîmes (Y)	38	17	13	8	58	40	+18	64	
6	Amiens (Y)	38	18	10	10	55	38	+17	64	

Source: Ligue 2
Rules for classification: 1) Points; 2) Goal difference; 3) Number of goals scored; 4) Head-to-head goal difference; 5) Fair play points
(C) Champions; (P) Promoted; (Y) Assured of promotion play-offs, but may still get promoted automatically.

But a dramatical last-minute goal thanks to Amiens striker, Emmanuel Bourgaud in the last minute of the injury time grants Amiens to climb in the second place and earning their first Ligue 1 season ever, it forced Troyes to completes the promotion play-off against Lorient and Lens a fourth place, and a remaining in the second-tier.

=== Final table ===
Pos	Team	Pld	W	D	L	GF	GA	GD	Pts	Promotion or Relegation
1	Strasbourg (C, P)	38	19	10	9	63	47	+16	67	Promotion to Ligue 1
2	Amiens (P)	38	19	9	10	56	38	+18	66	Promotion to Ligue 1
3	Troyes (Q)	38	19	9	10	59	43	+16	66	Qualification to promotion play-offs
4	Lens	38	18	11	9	59	40	+19	65	
5	Brest	38	19	8	11	58	44	+14	65	
6	Nîmes	38	17	13	8	58	40	+18	64	

Source: Ligue 2
Rules for classification: 1) Points; 2) Goal difference; 3) Number of goals scored; 4) Head-to-head goal difference; 5) Fair play points
(C) Champions; (P) Promoted; (Q) Qualified for the phase indicated

=== Outcome ===
After the final matchday, Strasbourg won the title and were promoted alongside Amiens and later, Troyes joined them by beating Lorient. They replaced the latter, AS Nancy Lorraine & SC Bastia, but SC Bastia themselves got demoted to the newly renamed Championnat National 3 after getting relegated to the Championnat National originally because their finances weren’t high enough.

=== Reviews ===
It was the closest title race ever according to a FourFourTwo website.

=== Aftermath ===
On 2023, French channel Remontada uploaded a video about that title race. They also highlighted the winning goal.

== Team changes ==
=== To Ligue 2 ===
Promoted from National

- Strasbourg
- Orléans
- Amiens

Relegated from Ligue 1

- Troyes
- Gazélec Ajaccio
- Reims

=== From Ligue 2 ===
Relegated to National

- Evian TG
- Paris FC
- Créteil

Promoted to Ligue 1

- Nancy
- Dijon
- Metz

=== Stadia and locations ===
Location of teams in 2016–17 Ligue 2

Club	Location	Venue	Capacity
Ajaccio	Ajaccio	Stade François Coty	10,660
Amiens	Amiens	Stade de la Licorne	12,097
Auxerre	Auxerre	Stade de l'Abbé-Deschamps	21,379
Bourg-en-Bresse	Bourg-en-Bresse	Stade Marcel-Verchère	11,400
Brest	Brest	Stade Francis-Le Blé	15,097
Clermont Foot	Clermont-Ferrand	Stade Gabriel Montpied	11,980
Gazélec Ajaccio	Ajaccio	Stade Ange Casanova	6,000
Laval	Laval	Stade Francis Le Basser	18,607
Le Havre	Le Havre	Stade Océane	25,000
Lens	Lens	Stade Bollaert-Delelis	38,223
Nîmes	Nîmes	Stade des Costières	18,482
Niort	Niort	Stade René Gaillard	10,886
Orléans	Orléans	Stade de la Source	7,000
Red Star	Saint-Ouen	Stade Jean-Bouin ^{1}	20,000
Reims	Reims	Stade Auguste Delaune	21,684
Sochaux	Montbéliard	Stade Auguste Bonal	20,000
Strasbourg	Strasbourg	Stade de la Meinau	29,230
Tours	Tours	Stade de la Vallée du Cher	16,247
Troyes	Troyes	Stade de l'Aube	21,684
Valenciennes	Valenciennes	Stade du Hainaut	25,172

- ^{1} Red Star original stadium, Stade Bauer, is not permitted to host professional matches. The club are playing their home games at Stade Jean-Bouin.

=== Personnel and kits ===
Team	Manager^{1}	Captain^{1}	Kit Manufacturer^{1}	Main Sponsor^{1}
Ajaccio	(France) Olivier Pantaloni	(France) Johan Cavalli	adidas	Suite Home
Amiens	(France) Christophe Pélissier	(France) Thomas Monconduit	adidas	Intersport
Auxerre	(France) Cédric Daury	(France) Lionel Mathis	Airness	Remorques LOUALT, Vitrans
Bourg-en-Bresse	(France) Hervé Della Maggiore	(France) Jimmy Nirlo	adidas	BestDrive
Brest	(France) Jean-Marc Furlan	(France) Bruno Grougi	Nike	Quéguiner
Clermont	(France) Corinne Diacre	(Guadeloupe) Cédric Avinel	Patrick	Crédit Mutuel
Gazélec Ajaccio	(France) Jean-Luc Vannuchi	(France) Louis Poggi	Macron	Carrefour, Casino D'Ajaccio
Laval	(France) Thierry Goudet	(Morocco) Hassane Alla	Kappa	Lactel
Le Havre	(France) Oswald Tanchot	(France) Alexandre Bonnet	Joma	Api
Lens	(France) Alain Casanova	(France) Loïck Landre	Umbro	Azerbaijan: Land of Fire
Nîmes	(France) Bernard Blaquart	(France) Mathieu Michel	Puma	Marie Blachère
Niort	(France) Denis Renaud	(France) Alliou Dembélé	Puma	Restaurant Le Billon (home), Cheminées Poujoulat (away)
Orléans	(France) Didier Ollé-Nicolle	(Democratic Republic of the Congo) Joël Sami	Kappa	CTVL
Red Star	(France) Claude Robin	(Gabon) Lloyd Palun	adidas	
Reims	(Armenia) Michel Der Zakarian	(Guadeloupe) Mickaël Tacalfred	Hungaria	Sanei Ascenseurs
Sochaux	(France) Albert Cartier	(France) Johann Ramaré	Lotto	Peugeot
Strasbourg	(France) Thierry Laurey	(France) Ernest Seka	Hummel	es energies
Tours	(France) Gilbert Zoonekynd	(France) Bryan Bergougnoux	Hungaria	Corsicatours
Troyes	(France) Jean-Louis Garcia	(France) Benjamin Nivet	Kappa	Babeau Seguin
Valenciennes	(Bosnia and Herzegovina) Faruk Hadžibegić	(France) Sébastien Roudet	Kipsta	Mutuelle Just

^{1}Subject to change during the season.

=== Managerial changes ===
Team	Outgoing manager	Manner of departure	Date of vacancy	Position in table	Incoming manager	Date of appointment
Reims	(France) David Guion	End of tenure as caretaker	23 May 2016	Pre-season	(Armenia) Michel Der Zakarian	23 May 2016
Gazélec Ajaccio	(France) Thierry Laurey	Mutual consent	25 May 2016	Pre-season	(France) Jean-Luc Vannuchi	27 May 2016
Auxerre	(France) Jean-Luc Vannuchi	End of contract	26 May 2016	Pre-season	(Romania) Viorel Moldovan	26 May 2016
Brest	(France) Alex Dupont	End of contract	30 May 2016	Pre-season	(France) Jean-Marc Furlan	30 May 2016
Strasbourg	(France) Jacky Duguépéroux	Sacked	30 May 2016	Pre-season	(France) Thierry Laurey	31 May 2016
Lens	(New Caledonia) Antoine Kombouaré	Signed by EA Guingamp	30 May 2016	Pre-season	(France) Alain Casanova	12 June 2016
Tours	(Italy) Marco Simone	Sacked	14 June 2016	Pre-season	(France) Fabien Mercadal	17 July 2016
Troyes	(Algeria) Mohamed Bradja	End of tenure as caretaker	30 June 2016	Pre-season	(France) Jean-Louis Garcia	1 July 2016
Auxerre	(Romania) Viorel Moldovan	Sacked	26 September 2016	19th	(France) Cédric Daury	7 October 2016
Le Havre	(United States) Bob Bradley	Signed by Swansea City	3 October 2016	5th	(France) Oswald Tanchot	3 October 2016
Laval	(France) Denis Zanko	Sacked	5 November 2016	14th	(Italy) Marco Simone	7 November 2016
Red Star	(Portugal) Rui Almeida	Sacked	12 December 2016	20th	(France) Claude Robin	10 January 2017
Orléans	(France) Olivier Frapolli	Sacked	28 December 2016	20th	(France) Didier Ollé-Nicolle	28 December 2016
Tours	(France) Fabien Mercadal	Sacked	18 February 2017	20th	(France) Gilbert Zoonekynd	27 March 2017
Laval	(Italy) Marco Simone	Sacked	11 April 2017	20th	(France) Thierry Goudet	12 April 2017

== League table ==
Pos	Team	Pld	W	D	L	GF	GA	GD	Pts	Promotion or Relegation
1	Strasbourg (C, P)	38	19	10	9	63	47	+16	67	Promotion to Ligue 1
2	Amiens (P)	38	19	9	10	56	38	+18	66	Promotion to Ligue 1
3	Troyes (O, P)	38	19	9	10	59	43	+16	66	Qualification to promotion play-offs
4	Lens	38	18	11	9	59	40	+19	65	
5	Brest	38	19	8	11	58	44	+14	65	
6	Nîmes	38	17	13	8	58	40	+18	64	
7	Reims	38	14	13	11	42	39	+3	55	
8	Le Havre	38	14	12	12	39	31	+8	54	
9	Gazélec Ajaccio	38	13	12	13	47	51	−4	51	
10	Niort	38	12	13	13	45	57	−12	49	
11	Ajaccio	38	13	9	16	47	58	−11	48	
12	Clermont Foot	38	11	13	14	46	48	−2	46	
13	Sochaux	38	11	13	14	38	43	−5	46	
14	Valenciennes	38	10	15	13	44	44	0	45	
15	Bourg-Péronnas	38	11	11	16	49	58	−9	44	
16	Tours	38	10	13	15	55	60	−5	43	
17	Auxerre	38	11	10	17	28	40	−12	43	
18	Orléans (Note: On 1 March 2017, the Commission de Contrôle des Clubs Professionnels de la DNCG confirmed a deduction of 4 points from Orléans for failing to adhere with financial reporting obligations.) (O)	38	11	9	18	41	54	−13	38	Qualification to relegation play-offs
19	Red Star (R)	38	8	12	18	36	56	−20	36	Relegation to Championnat National
20	Laval (R)	38	5	15	18	33	52	−19	30	Relegation to Championnat National

Source: Ligue 2
Rules for classification: 1) Points; 2) Goal difference; 3) Number of goals scored; 4) Head-to-head goal difference; 5) Fair play points
(C) Champions; (O) Play-off winners; (P) Promoted; (R) Relegated

== Results ==
Home \ Away	GAZ	ACA	AMI	AUX	BPE	BRS	CLR	LVL	LHA	RCL	NMS	NRT	ORL	RSFC	REI	SOC	RCS	TOU	TRO	VAL
Gazélec Ajaccio		4–1	1–1	2–0	2–3	0–0	4–4	1–1	1–1	0–4	0–2	1–0	2–0	2–1	1–1	0–1	1–1	2–2	3–1	1–0
Ajaccio	1–0		1–1	2–0	3–1	1–1	2–1	1–3	0–0	3–6	1–2	3–1	1–0	1–2	1–0	0–0	2–0	3–2	2–1	3–2
Amiens	4–0	2–1		0–0	2–1	3–0	0–1	3–0	2–0	2–1	1–2	2–0	0–2	0–0	1–1	0–1	4–3	3–1	0–1	0–0
Auxerre	1–2	1–0	1–0		0–2	3–1	0–1	2–0	0–1	1–1	2–0	0–4	0–2	1–0	1–2	0–0	0–2	1–1	2–3	1–1
Bourg-Péronnas	1–0	3–2	2–4	2–4		1–2	1–1	0–0	2–1	0–0	0–1	2–2	0–0	4–1	1–0	0–1	0–0	3–2	2–4	0–2
Brest	6–2	1–2	2–3	1–0	0–0		0–2	3–0	2–0	1–2	2–3	2–3	2–1	0–1	2–1	2–0	2–1	1–1	2–1	3–2
Clermont	3–1	2–1	1–0	0–1	2–3	1–1		1–1	1–3	1–1	2–3	0–1	3–0	0–0	0–1	1–2	0–0	0–0	1–1	1–0
Laval	0–1	1–1	2–2	0–0	2–4	0–1	1–1		0–2	0–1	1–2	1–1	3–1	1–1	5–2	1–1	1–2	1–3	1–0	0–0
Le Havre	1–2	2–0	0–0	1–0	3–0	1–1	0–1	2–0		1–0	1–0	0–0	4–1	1–1	1–1	2–1	0–1	0–2	1–3	2–2
Lens	2–1	1–1	0–1	0–1	1–1	0–2	3–1	2–0	1–0		1–3	3–1	4–2	2–0	1–1	2–1	1–1	2–2	0–0	2–0
Nîmes	1–1	3–1	2–3	0–1	0–0	1–2	1–1	0–0	0–0	0–2		3–0	2–0	2–0	3–0	0–0	2–2	1–1	2–2	1–0
Niort	0–0	1–1	2–1	1–0	3–2	0–3	2–1	2–2	1–1	0–0	1–3		1–0	2–3	0–3	2–0	2–2	1–4	3–2	2–1
Orléans	1–1	2–0	1–2	0–0	1–0	0–1	2–2	2–1	0–1	2–1	2–1	1–1		4–0	2–2	1–0	3–1	0–0	1–1	0–2
Red Star	0–3	2–0	0–1	0–0	4–1	0–3	1–3	1–0	0–0	2–3	3–3	0–1	1–0		0–1	1–1	1–1	3–1	1–2	2–2
Reims	2–0	3–0	1–2	3–0	1–0	1–1	2–1	0–2	1–0	0–2	1–1	1–0	0–2	2–1		0–1	1–1	1–1	2–0	0–0
Sochaux	1–2	1–0	1–2	0–1	1–1	2–2	3–3	1–1	0–1	1–0	2–1	2–2	0–0	2–0	1–1		1–2	2–1	2–3	0–0
Strasbourg	2–0	4–2	1–0	2–1	2–1	4–1	0–2	1–0	2–0	3–1	1–1	3–0	3–2	0–0	1–2	2–0		4–2	2–0	2–4
Tours	0–3	0–0	0–3	2–1	0–2	0–1	3–0	1–1	0–4	2–3	1–3	0–0	3–1	3–1	1–1	3–1	1–3		0–0	4–1
Troyes	1–0	1–2	4–0	1–1	1–0	1–0	1–0	1–0	2–1	1–1	0–0	1–1	4–2	3–2	2–0	1–3	4–0	3–1		2–0
Valenciennes	0–0	1–1	1–1	0–0	3–3	0–1	2–0	2–0	0–0	1–2	2–3	3–1	4–0	0–0	0–0	2–1	2–1	0–4	2–0	

Source: Ligue 2
Legend: Blue = home team win; Yellow = draw; Red = away team win.

== Top scorers ==
As of end of season

Rank	Player	Club	Goals
1	(Mali) Adama Niane	Troyes	23
2	(Morocco) Khalid Boutaïb	Strasbourg	20
3	(Gabon) Denis Bouanga	Tours	16
3	(Spain) Cristian López	Lens	16
5	(Madagascar) Faneva Imà Andriatsima	Sochaux	14
5	(Cameroon) Andé Dona Ndoh	Niort	14
7	(Morocco) Rachid Alioui	Nîmes	13
7	(France) Rémy Dugimont	Clermont	13
9	(France) Neal Maupay	Brest	11
9	(France) Riad Nouri	Ajaccio	11

== Play-offs ==
The 2016–17 season will see the return of a relegation play-off between the 18th placed Ligue 1 team and the 3rd placed team in the Ligue 2 in a two-legged confrontation. The Ligue 2 team will host the first game. Another relegation play-off involves the 18th placed Ligue 2 team and the 3rd placed National team also in two legs.

23 May 2017
20:45

Paris FC	0–1	Orléans
	Report	Sami 49'

Stade Charléty
Referee: Clément Turpin

28 May 2017
18:00

Orléans	1–0	Paris FC
Nabab 75'	Report

Stade de la Source
Referee: Frank Schneider

Orléans won 2–0 on aggregate.

== Attendances ==
No.	Club	Average	Highest
1	Lens	28,996	38,033
2	Strasbourg	17,013	27,503
3	Reims	10,403	18,492
4	Sochaux	9,504	16,037
5	Stade brestois	8,040	12,502
6	Valenciennes	7,905	15,323
7	Amiens	7,897	11,927
8	Havre AC	7,791	10,043
9	ESTAC	7,209	12,093
10	Nîmes	6,614	14,606
11	AJ auxerroise	6,091	12,431
12	Red Star	4,944	10,874
13	Stade lavallois	4,917	8,626
14	Tours	4,551	6,554
15	Orléans	4,262	6,791
16	Chamois niortais	3,705	5,620
17	Clermont	3,280	7,722
18	Gazélec	3,074	4,052
19	Ajaccio	2,744	3,784
20	FBBP	2,493	3,545
