= 2017–18 Ligue 2 =

79th season of the second-tier football league in France

Ligue 2
- Season: 2017–18
- Champions: Reims
- Promoted: Reims; Nîmes
- Relegated: Bourg-Péronnas; Quevilly-Rouen; Tours
- Matches: 380
- Goals: 1,035 (2.72 per match)
- Top goalscorer: 24 goals Umut Bozok, Nîmes
- Biggest home win: Lorient 6–0 Bourg-Péronnas (4 May 2018)
- Biggest away win: Bourg-Péronnas 0–6 Lens (13 October 2017)
- Highest scoring: Bourg-Péronnas 5–4 AC Ajaccio (2 March 2018)
- Highest attendance: 35,520; Lens vs Reims (21 October 2017)
- Lowest attendance: 588; Quevilly-Rouen vs Bourg-Péronnas (11 August 2017)
- Average attendance: 6,484
- All statistics correct as of 21:43, 11 May 2018 (UTC).

The 2017–18 Ligue 2 (referred to as the Domino's Ligue 2 for sponsorship reasons) season was the 79th season since its establishment.

== Teams ==
There are 20 clubs in the league, with three promoted teams from Championnat National replacing the three teams that were relegated from Ligue 2 following the 2016–17 season. All clubs that secured Ligue 2 status for the season were subject to approval by the DNCG before becoming eligible to participate.

=== Team changes ===
Promoted from 2016–17 Championnat National

- Quevilly-Rouen
- Châteauroux
- Paris FC

Relegated from 2016–17 Ligue 1

- Nancy
- Lorient

Promoted to 2017–18 Ligue 1

- Troyes
- Amiens
- Strasbourg

Relegated to 2017–18 Championnat National

- Laval
- Red Star

=== Stadia and locations ===
Location of teams in 2017–18 Ligue 2

| Club | Location | Venue | Capacity |
|---|---|---|---|
| AC Ajaccio | Ajaccio | Stade François Coty | 10,446 |
| Auxerre | Auxerre | Stade de l'Abbé-Deschamps | 21,379 |
| Bourg-Péronnas | Bourg-en-Bresse | Stade Marcel-Verchère | 11,400 |
| Brest | Brest | Stade Francis-Le Blé | 15,097 |
| Châteauroux | Châteauroux | Stade Gaston Petit | 17,173 |
| Clermont Foot | Clermont-Ferrand | Stade Gabriel Montpied | 11,980 |
| Gazélec Ajaccio | Ajaccio | Stade Ange Casanova | 8,000 |
| Le Havre | Le Havre | Stade Océane | 25,000 |
| Lens | Lens | Stade Bollaert-Delelis | 38,223 |
| Lorient | Lorient | Stade du Moustoir | 18,890 |
| Nancy | Tomblaine | Stade Marcel Picot | 20,087 |
| Nîmes | Nîmes | Stade des Costières | 18,482 |
| Niort | Niort | Stade René Gaillard | 10,886 |
| Orléans | Orléans | Stade de la Source | 7,000 |
| Paris FC | Paris | Stade Charléty | 20,000 |
| Quevilly-Rouen | Le Petit-Quevilly | Stade Robert Diochon | 12,018 |
| Reims | Reims | Stade Auguste Delaune | 21,684 |
| Sochaux | Montbéliard | Stade Auguste Bonal | 20,000 |
| Tours | Tours | Stade de la Vallée du Cher | 16,247 |
| Valenciennes | Valenciennes | Stade du Hainaut | 25,172 |

=== Personnel and kits ===
| Team | Manager^{1} | Captain^{1} | Kit Manufacturer^{1} | Main Sponsor^{1} |
|---|---|---|---|---|
| AC Ajaccio | (France) Olivier Pantaloni | (France) Johan Cavalli | Adidas | Corse du Sud |
| Auxerre | (Uruguay) Pablo Correa | (Guadeloupe) Mickaël Tacalfred | Macron | Remorques LOUALT, Vitrans |
| Bourg-Péronnas | (France) Hervé Della Maggiore | (France) Jimmy Nirlo | Adidas | BestDrive |
| Brest | (France) Jean-Marc Furlan | (Martinique) Bruno Grougi | Nike | Quéguiner |
| Châteauroux | (France) Jean-Luc Vasseur | (Cameroon) Yannick M'Bone | Nike | Monin |
| Clermont | (France) Pascal Gastien | (Madagascar) Thomas Fontaine | Patrick | Crédit Mutuel |
| Gazélec Ajaccio | (France) Albert Cartier | (France) Jérémie Bréchet | Macron | Carrefour, Casino D'Ajaccio |
| Le Havre | (France) Oswald Tanchot | (France) Alexandre Bonnet | Joma | Api |
| Lens | (France) Éric Sikora | (France) Clément Chantôme | Umbro | Auchan Retail |
| Lorient | (France) Mickaël Landreau | (France) Vincent Le Goff | Kappa | B&B Hotels, Jean Floc'h |
| Nancy | (France) Didier Tholot | (Morocco) Youssouf Hadji | Nike | Sopalin |
| Nîmes | (France) Bernard Blaquart | (Algeria) Féthi Harek | Puma | Marie Blachère |
| Niort | (France) Jean-Philippe Faure | (France) Alliou Dembélé | Erima | Restaurant Le Billon (home), Cheminées Poujoulat (away) |
| Orléans | (France) Didier Ollé-Nicolle | (France) Matthieu Ligoule | Kappa | CTVL |
| Paris | (France) Fabien Mercadal | (Ivory Coast) Hervé Lybohy | Nike | Vinci |
| Quevilly-Rouen | (France) Emmanuel Da Costa | (Portugal) Stanislas Oliveira | Kappa | Matmut |
| Reims | (France) David Guion | (Cape Verde) Danilson da Cruz | Hungaria | Sanei Ascenseurs |
| Sochaux | (Germany) Peter Zeidler | (France) Florian Tardieu | Lotto | Ledus |
| Tours | (Portugal) Jorge Costa | (France) Bryan Bergougnoux | Kappa | Corsicatours |
| Valenciennes | (France) Réginald Ray | (France) Sébastien Roudet | Kipsta | Mutuelle Just |

^{1}Subject to change during the season.

=== Managerial changes ===
| Team | Outgoing manager | Manner of departure | Date of vacancy | Position in table | Incoming manager | Date of appointment |
|---|---|---|---|---|---|---|
| Reims | (Armenia) Michel Der Zakarian | Signed by Montpellier | 23 May 2017 | Pre-season | (France) David Guion | 25 May 2017 |
| Lorient | (France) Bernard Casoni | Sacked | 30 May 2017 | Pre-season | (France) Mickaël Landreau | 30 May 2017 |
| Sochaux | (France) Albert Cartier | Resigned | 1 June 2017 | Pre-season | (Germany) Peter Zeidler | 2 June 2017 |
| Gazélec Ajaccio | (France) Jean-Luc Vannuchi | Resigned | 26 May 2017 | Pre-season | (France) Albert Cartier | 30 May 2017 |
| Auxerre | (France) Cédric Daury | Appointed as Sporting Director | 1 June 2017 | Pre-season | (France) Francis Gillot | 1 June 2017 |
| Châteauroux | (France) Michel Estevan | Sacked | 1 June 2017 | Pre-season | (France) Jean-Luc Vasseur | 2 June 2017 |
| Lens | (France) Alain Casanova | Sacked | 20 August 2017 | 19th | (France) Éric Sikora | 20 August 2017 |
| Nancy | (Uruguay) Pablo Correa | Sacked | 29 August 2017 | 16th | (France) Vincent Hognon | 30 August 2017 |
| Clermont Foot | (France) Corinne Diacre | Signed by France women | 30 August 2017 | 8th | (France) Pascal Gastien | 1 September 2017 |
| Valenciennes | (Bosnia and Herzegovina) Faruk Hadžibegić | Sacked | 26 September 2017 | 14th | (France) Réginald Ray | 14 October 2017 |
| Tours | (France) Gilbert Zoonekynd | Sacked | 16 October 2017 | 20th | (Portugal) Jorge Costa | 22 November 2017 |
| Auxerre | (France) Francis Gillot | Sacked | 9 December 2017 | 16th | (Uruguay) Pablo Correa | 21 December 2017 |
| Nancy | (France) Vincent Hognon | Sacked | 22 January 2018 | 17th | (France) Patrick Gabriel (caretaker) | 28 January 2018 |
| Niort | (France) Denis Renaud | Sacked | 26 February 2018 | 14th | (France) Jean-Philippe Faure (caretaker) | 26 February 2018 |
| Nancy | (France) Patrick Gabriel (caretaker) | End of caretaker | 3 April 2018 | 18th | (France) Didier Tholot | 3 April 2018 |

== League table ==
| Pos | Team | Pld | W | D | L | GF | GA | GD | Pts | Promotion or Relegation |
|---|---|---|---|---|---|---|---|---|---|---|
| 1 | Reims (C, P) | 38 | 28 | 4 | 6 | 74 | 24 | +50 | 88 | Promotion to Ligue 1 |
| 2 | Nîmes (P) | 38 | 22 | 7 | 9 | 75 | 37 | +38 | 73 | Promotion to Ligue 1 |
| 3 | Ajaccio | 38 | 20 | 8 | 10 | 62 | 43 | +19 | 68 | Qualification to promotion play-offs semi-final |
| 4 | Le Havre | 38 | 19 | 9 | 10 | 53 | 34 | +19 | 66 | Qualification to promotion play-offs quarter-final |
| 5 | Brest | 38 | 18 | 11 | 9 | 58 | 43 | +15 | 65 | Qualification to promotion play-offs quarter-final |
| 6 | Clermont | 38 | 17 | 12 | 9 | 54 | 36 | +18 | 63 | |
| 7 | Lorient | 38 | 18 | 8 | 12 | 61 | 46 | +15 | 62 | |
| 8 | Paris FC | 38 | 16 | 13 | 9 | 46 | 36 | +10 | 61 | |
| 9 | Châteauroux | 38 | 17 | 9 | 12 | 50 | 50 | 0 | 60 | |
| 10 | Sochaux | 38 | 15 | 8 | 15 | 51 | 62 | −11 | 53 | |
| 11 | Auxerre | 38 | 13 | 8 | 17 | 51 | 55 | −4 | 47 | |
| 12 | Orléans | 38 | 12 | 10 | 16 | 52 | 61 | −9 | 46 | |
| 13 | Valenciennes | 38 | 12 | 9 | 17 | 50 | 64 | −14 | 45 | |
| 14 | Lens | 38 | 11 | 10 | 17 | 48 | 49 | −1 | 43 | |
| 15 | Niort | 38 | 11 | 9 | 18 | 47 | 60 | −13 | 42 | |
| 16 | Gazélec Ajaccio | 38 | 11 | 8 | 19 | 35 | 60 | −25 | 41 | |
| 17 | Nancy | 38 | 9 | 11 | 18 | 39 | 54 | −15 | 38 | |
| 18 | Bourg-Péronnas (R) | 38 | 10 | 6 | 22 | 50 | 87 | −37 | 36 | Qualification to relegation play-offs |
| 19 | Quevilly-Rouen (R) | 38 | 9 | 6 | 23 | 45 | 66 | −21 | 33 | Relegation to Championnat National |
| 20 | Tours (R) | 38 | 5 | 8 | 25 | 34 | 68 | −34 | 23 | Relegation to Championnat National |

Source: Ligue 2
Rules for classification: 1) Points; 2) Goal difference; 3) Head-to-head points; 4) Head-to-head goal difference; 5) Head-to-head goals scored; 6) Head-to-head away goals; 7) Goals scored; 8) Away goals scored; 9) Most goals scored in one league match; 10) Fair-play points
(C) Champions; (P) Promoted; (R) Relegated

== Results ==
| Home \ Away | GAZ | ACA | AUX | BPE | BRS | CHA | CLR | LHA | RCL | LOR | NAL | NMS | NRT | ORL | PAR | QUR | REI | SOC | TOU | VAL |
|---|---|---|---|---|---|---|---|---|---|---|---|---|---|---|---|---|---|---|---|---|
| Gazélec Ajaccio | | 0–1 | 3–1 | 1–2 | 1–1 | 2–1 | 2–1 | 1–1 | 1–1 | 0–0 | 2–1 | 2–0 | 0–2 | 1–0 | 0–0 | 1–0 | 1–2 | 0–1 | 3–2 | 3–4 |
| Ajaccio | 2–0 | | 3–1 | 2–0 | 2–1 | 1–2 | 2–1 | 1–0 | 2–0 | 3–2 | 2–0 | 1–4 | 2–2 | 1–1 | 2–0 | 2–0 | 0–1 | 3–2 | 2–1 | 3–0 |
| Auxerre | 0–1 | 1–1 | | 3–1 | 1–2 | 1–2 | 1–2 | 1–1 | 1–0 | 1–0 | 1–1 | 0–0 | 5–0 | 1–3 | 1–1 | 2–1 | 1–4 | 2–0 | 1–1 | 2–0 |
| Bourg-Péronnas | 2–0 | 5–4 | 1–1 | | 2–4 | 3–0 | 0–2 | 2–1 | 0–6 | 2–2 | 3–2 | 2–2 | 0–1 | 4–0 | 1–2 | 3–5 | 0–2 | 2–1 | 1–1 | 1–3 |
| Brest | 0–0 | 2–3 | 1–1 | 3–0 | | 2–3 | 1–0 | 1–0 | 1–1 | 3–0 | 2–1 | 0–2 | 2–0 | 0–1 | 1–1 | 2–0 | 0–0 | 1–0 | 1–3 | 3–1 |
| Châteauroux | 4–1 | 0–2 | 1–2 | 3–1 | 2–2 | | 0–2 | 2–1 | 0–0 | 3–1 | 1–0 | 1–0 | 2–1 | 0–0 | 0–0 | 3–2 | 3–1 | 1–1 | 1–0 | 0–1 |
| Clermont | 1–0 | 1–1 | 1–0 | 4–1 | 1–2 | 1–1 | | 3–0 | 1–0 | 0–2 | 2–0 | 1–1 | 2–2 | 4–2 | 2–2 | 1–1 | 2–1 | 0–2 | 2–0 | 3–0 |
| Le Havre | 2–1 | 2–0 | 4–1 | 0–0 | 1–0 | 1–1 | 2–1 | | 1–0 | 3–2 | 3–0 | 2–1 | 2–1 | 1–1 | 1–1 | 0–2 | 0–0 | 1–0 | 2–0 | 1–0 |
| Lens | 2–0 | 2–0 | 2–1 | 0–1 | 2–4 | 2–1 | 0–1 | 3–3 | | 2–3 | 1–1 | 1–2 | 3–1 | 0–1 | 1–0 | 2–0 | 0–1 | 0–1 | 2–0 | 1–1 |
| Lorient | 4–1 | 2–0 | 1–3 | 6–0 | 4–2 | 3–0 | 1–1 | 1–0 | 1–1 | | 0–0 | 1–2 | 0–0 | 3–1 | 2–0 | 1–1 | 2–1 | 2–1 | 2–0 | 0–1 |
| Nancy | 1–0 | 2–2 | 2–1 | 2–1 | 2–2 | 4–1 | 2–2 | 0–3 | 1–1 | 0–2 | | 0–2 | 0–0 | 3–0 | 0–1 | 1–2 | 0–2 | 2–2 | 3–1 | 3–0 |
| Nîmes | 4–0 | 1–1 | 3–0 | 4–0 | 4–0 | 3–0 | 3–1 | 1–0 | 0–1 | 1–0 | 0–0 | | 1–5 | 4–1 | 2–1 | 4–1 | 0–1 | 0–2 | 2–2 | 1–0 |
| Niort | 4–1 | 0–0 | 2–0 | 2–0 | 0–2 | 2–1 | 1–1 | 0–1 | 2–2 | 1–2 | 0–0 | 1–4 | | 2–3 | 0–2 | 2–1 | 1–2 | 1–1 | 2–1 | 1–2 |
| Orléans | 2–0 | 0–0 | 2–3 | 5–1 | 1–1 | 1–1 | 1–2 | 2–1 | 2–0 | 1–2 | 3–1 | 1–4 | 3–1 | | 1–1 | 2–1 | 0–2 | 3–3 | 1–1 | 3–4 |
| Paris | 0–0 | 2–1 | 2–1 | 2–0 | 0–1 | 0–0 | 0–0 | 0–3 | 2–2 | 1–1 | 2–1 | 2–1 | 0–1 | 1–0 | | 2–0 | 0–3 | 2–0 | 2–0 | 3–2 |
| Quevilly-Rouen | 0–2 | 0–1 | 4–1 | 1–4 | 1–4 | 0–1 | 0–2 | 0–2 | 1–2 | 3–0 | 2–0 | 1–3 | 1–2 | 1–0 | 0–4 | | 1–2 | 1–1 | 4–0 | 2–2 |
| Reims | 5–0 | 1–0 | 2–0 | 3–0 | 0–1 | 4–0 | 1–0 | 0–1 | 3–1 | 0–1 | 3–0 | 2–2 | 3–1 | 2–0 | 1–1 | 2–1 | | 3–0 | 1–0 | 5–1 |
| Sochaux | 4–1 | 1–6 | 0–4 | 2–0 | 1–1 | 1–5 | 1–3 | 3–2 | 3–2 | 0–2 | 1–0 | 2–1 | 2–1 | 3–2 | 1–0 | 0–1 | 2–4 | | 0–0 | 3–1 |
| Tours | 1–2 | 1–3 | 0–2 | 3–2 | 1–2 | 0–1 | 0–0 | 0–3 | 4–2 | 3–1 | 1–2 | 0–4 | 2–1 | 1–1 | 1–2 | 2–2 | 0–1 | 0–1 | | 1–2 |
| Valenciennes | 1–1 | 2–0 | 0–2 | 2–2 | 0–0 | 1–2 | 0–0 | 1–1 | 1–0 | 4–2 | 0–1 | 1–2 | 4–1 | 0–1 | 2–4 | 1–1 | 1–3 | 2–2 | 2–0 | |

Source: Ligue 2
Legend: Blue = home team win; Yellow = draw; Red = away team win.

== Promotion play-offs ==
A promotion play-off competition was held at the end of the season, involving the 3rd, 4th and 5th-placed teams in 2017–18 Ligue 2, and the 18th-placed team in 2017–18 Ligue 1.

The quarter-final was played on 15 May, the semi-final on 18 May and the final on 23 and 27 May 2018.

Quarter-final
4 | Le Havre | 2
5 | Brest | 0

Semi-final
3 | Ajaccio (p) | 2 (5)
4 | Le Havre | 2 (3)

Final
3 | Ajaccio | 0 | 0 | 0
18 | Toulouse | 3 | 1 | 4

=== Quarter-final ===
15 May 2018
20:45

| Le Havre | 2–0 | Brest |
|---|---|---|
| Fontaine 38'; Bonnet 88' |

Stade Océane, Le Havre
Attendance: 13,591
Referee: Benoît Millot

=== Semi-final ===
20 May 2018
19:00

| Ajaccio | 2–2 (a.e.t.) | Le Havre |
|---|---|---|
| Gimbert 16'; Camara 120+5' | Report | Mateta 36', 111' (pen.) |
Penalties
| Selemani (penalty scored); Laçi (penalty scored); Camara (penalty scored); Lejeune (penalty scored); Gimbert (penalty scored) | 5–3 | (penalty missed) Ferhat; (penalty scored) Guitane; (penalty scored) Fontaine; (penalty scored) Gory |

Stade François Coty, Ajaccio
Attendance: 6,541
Referee: Frank Schneider

Notes

1. The date and time of the match was postponed from 18 May after fans of Ajaccio did not let Le Havre's bus reach the stadium.

== Relegation play-offs ==
A relegation play-off was held at the end of the season between the 18th-placed Ligue 2 team and the 3rd-placed team of 2017–18 Championnat National. This was played over two legs on 22 and 27 May 2018.

22 May 2018
20:45

| Grenoble | 2–1 | Bourg-Péronnas |
|---|---|---|
| Sotoca 1'; Elogo (red card) 69'; Belvito 83' | Report | Bègue 45+1' |

Stade des Alpes, Grenoble
Referee: Nicolas Rainville

27 May 2018
18:00

| Bourg-Péronnas | 0–0 | Grenoble |
|---|---|---|
| Sarr (red card) 90+5' | Report |

Stade Marcel-Verchère, Bourg-en-Bresse
Attendance: 4,700
Referee: François Letexier

Grenoble are promoted to 2018–19 Ligue 2

== Top scorers ==
As of 11 May 2018

| Rank | Player | Club | Goals |
|---|---|---|---|
| 1 | (Turkey) Umut Bozok | Nîmes | 24 |
| 2 | (Morocco) Rachid Alioui | Nîmes | 17 |
| 2 | (France) Theoson Siebatcheu | Reims | 17 |
| 2 | (France) Jean-Philippe Mateta | Le Havre | 17 |
| 5 | (Cameroon) Dona Ndoh | Niort | 15 |
| 6 | (France) Ludovic Ajorque | Clermont | 14 |
| 6 | (Argentina) Pablo Chavarría | Reims | 14 |
| 8 | (France) Ghislain Gimbert | Ajaccio | 13 |
| 8 | (France) Riad Nouri | Ajaccio | 13 |
| 10 | (France) Florian Martin | Sochaux | 12 |
| 10 | (France) Yoane Wissa | Ajaccio/Lorient | 12 |
| 10 | (Senegal) Yannick Gomis | Orléans | 12 |
| 10 | (France) Malik Tchokounté | Paris | 12 |

== Attendances ==
| No. | Club | Average |
|---|---|---|
| 1 | Lens | 23,746 |
| 2 | Nancy | 11,850 |
| 3 | Reims | 9,866 |
| 4 | Lorient | 8,564 |
| 5 | Valenciennes | 8,279 |
| 6 | Sochaux | 7,918 |
| 7 | Nîmes | 7,838 |
| 8 | Stade brestois | 7,458 |
| 9 | Havre AC | 7,399 |
| 10 | AJ auxerroise | 6,003 |
| 11 | La Berrichonne | 4,472 |
| 12 | Orléans | 3,997 |
| 13 | Tours | 3,585 |
| 14 | Chamois niortais | 3,480 |
| 15 | Ajaccio | 3,421 |
| 16 | Clermont | 3,369 |
| 17 | Paris FC | 3,070 |
| 18 | Gazélec | 3,011 |
| 19 | FBBP | 2,813 |
| 20 | Quevilly-Rouen | 2,666 |
