= 2014–15 Ligue 2 =

76th season of the second-tier football league in France

Ligue 2
- Season: 2014–15
- Champions: Troyes
- Promoted: Troyes; Gazélec Ajaccio; Angers
- Relegated: Orléans; Châteauroux; Arles-Avignon
- Matches: 380
- Goals: 855 (2.25 per match)
- Top goalscorer: Mickaël Le Bihan (18 goals)
- Highest attendance: 20,136; Troyes 4–1 Châteauroux (22 May 2015)
- Average attendance: 6,159

The 2014–15 Ligue 2 season was the 76th season since its establishment.

== Teams ==
There were three promoted teams from Championnat National, replacing the three teams that were promoted to Ligue 1 following the 2013–14 season. A total of 20 teams competed in the league with three clubs relegated to the third division, the National. All clubs that secured Ligue 2 status for the season were subject to approval by the DNCG before becoming eligible to participate.

On 18 April 2014, Luzenac became the first team to secure a spot in the Ligue 2 following a 1–0 victory over Boulogne-sur-Mer, which gave them an advance on the 4th placed team, Red Star, that couldn't be surpassed in the last games. By gaining promotion for a professional level for the first time in its history, Luzenac, the club of a village of 600 inhabitants in Southern France, became the smallest club in the history of professional football in France. Orléans was the second team to gain promotion to Ligue 2 on 2 May after a 2–0 victory against Paris FC. This marked a return for Orléans in the professional leagues after a twenty-two-years absence. Gazélec Ajaccio was the third and last team to achieve promotion on 9 May 2014. This means that for the first time since the 1997–98 season, a Derby of Ajaccio will be contested between Gazélec and AC Ajaccio.

On 20 April, Ajaccio officially suffered relegation from Ligue 1 after a 2–1 defeat in the Derby Corse against archrivals Bastia. This ended a three-year stint for Ajaccio in Ligue 1. Valenciennes FC were the second team to suffer relegation on 4 May. On 5 June, Luzenac's promotion was revoked by DNCG for financial reasons, but the club decided to appeal.

On 25 June, the DNCG relegated Valenciennes FC to the Championnat National because of their approximate amount of €8 million in debts, this allowing Châteauroux to remain in Ligue 2. On 4 July, DNCG confirmed its denial of Luzenac's promotion despite the appeal, allowing Istres also to remain in Ligue 2. On 11 July the ruling against Valenciennes FC was revoked and FC Istres was once again relegated. Luzenac was found to have an inadequate stadium, thus they were denied promotion. They were also denied re-entry to the Championnat National, so they later entered the regional leagues.

=== Stadia and locations ===
Location of teams in 2014–15 Ligue 2

Club	Location	Venue	Capacity
Ajaccio	Ajaccio	Stade François Coty	10,660
Gazélec Ajaccio	Ajaccio	Stade Ange Casanova	5,000
Angers	Angers	Stade Jean Bouin	17,835
Arles-Avignon	Avignon	Parc des Sports	17,518
Auxerre	Auxerre	Stade de l'Abbé-Deschamps	21,379
Brest	Brest	Stade Francis-Le Blé	15,583
Châteauroux	Châteauroux	Stade Gaston Petit	17,072
Clermont	Clermont-Ferrand	Stade Gabriel Montpied	11,980
Créteil	Créteil	Stade Dominique Duvauchelle	12,150
Dijon	Dijon	Stade Gaston Gérard	16,098
Laval	Laval	Stade Francis Le Basser	18,467
Le Havre	Le Havre	Stade Océane	25,278
Nancy	Tomblaine	Stade Marcel Picot	20,087
Nîmes	Nîmes	Stade des Costières	18,482
Niort	Niort	Stade René Gaillard	10,406
Orléans	Orléans	Stade de la Source	8,000
Sochaux	Montbéliard	Stade Auguste Bonal	20,005
Tours	Tours	Stade de la Vallée du Cher	16,327
Troyes	Troyes	Stade de l'Aube	20,842
Valenciennes	Valenciennes	Stade du Hainaut	25,172

=== Personnel and kits ===
Team	Manager^{1}	Captain^{1}	Kit Manufacturer^{1}	Main Sponsor^{1}
Ajaccio	(France) Olivier Pantaloni	(France) Johan Cavalli	Macron	Suite Home
Gazélec Ajaccio	(France) Thierry Laurey	(France) Louis Poggi	Macron	Carrefour
Angers	(France) Stéphane Moulin	(France) Olivier Auriac	Kappa	Scania
Arles-Avignon	(France) Victor Zvunka	(France) Erwan Quintin	Legea	Groupe Nicollin
Auxerre	(France) Jean-Luc Vannuchi	(France) Sébastien Puygrenier	Airness	Remarques LOUALT, Vitrans
Brest	(France) Alex Dupont	(France) Bruno Grougi	Nike	Quéguiner
Châteauroux	(France) Cédric Daury	(France) Sébastien Roudet	Nike	
Clermont	(France) Corinne Diacre	(Cameroon) Eugène Ekobo	Patrick	Crédit Mutuel
Créteil	(France) Thierry Froger	(France) Jean-Michel Lesage	Nike	SFB Béton, Holcim
Dijon	(France) Olivier Dall'Oglio	(France) Cédric Varrault	Kappa	DVF, Doras, IPS
Laval	(France) Denis Zanko	(France) Anthony Gonçalves	Kappa	Lactel
Le Havre	(France) Thierry Goudet	(France) Yohann Rivière	Nike	Api
Nancy	(Uruguay) Pablo Correa	(France) François Bellugou	Nike	Dane Elec
Nîmes	(France) José Pasqualetti	(France) Toifilou Maoulida	Erreà	Marie Blachère
Niort	(France) Régis Brouard	(Senegal) Mouhamadou Diaw	Puma	Restaurant Le Billon (home), Cheminées Poujoulat (away)
Orléans	(France) Olivier Frapolli	(France) Maxime Brillault	Kappa	CTVL
Sochaux	(France) Olivier Echouafni	(France) Édouard Butin	Lotto	Peugeot
Tours	(France) Gilbert Zoonekynd	(France) Bryan Bergougnoux	Nike	Corsicatours
Troyes	(France) Jean-Marc Furlan	(France) Benjamin Nivet	Kappa	Babeau Seguin, FSE
Valenciennes	(France) David Le Frapper	(Mali) Adama Coulibaly	Uhlsport	GDE Recyclage

^{1}Subject to change during the season.

=== Managerial changes ===
Team	Outgoing manager	Manner of departure	Date of vacancy	Position in table	Replaced by	Date of appointment
Clermont Foot	(France) Régis Brouard	End of contract	16 May 2014	Pre-season	(Portugal) Helena Costa	16 May 2014
Chamois Niortais	(France) Pascal Gastien	End of contract	16 May 2014	Pre-season	(France) Régis Brouard	21 May 2014
Sochaux	(France) Hervé Renard	End of contract	17 May 2014	Pre-season	(France) Olivier Echouafni	17 June 2014
Châteauroux	(France) Jean-Louis Garcia	Resigned	29 May 2014	Pre-season	(France) Pascal Gastien	4 June 2014
Créteil	(France) Jean-Luc Vasseur	Signed by Reims	14 June 2014	Pre-season	(France) Philippe Hinschberger	17 June 2014
Clermont Foot	(Portugal) Helena Costa	Mutual consent	24 June 2014	Pre-season	(France) Corinne Diacre	28 June 2014
Nîmes	(France) René Marsiglia	Mutual consent	24 June 2014	Pre-season	(France) José Pasqualetti	25 June 2014
Valenciennes	(Belgium) Ariël Jacobs	Resigned	11 July 2014	Pre-season	(France) Bernard Casoni	17 July 2014
Arles-Avignon	(France) Franck Dumas	Resigned	22 August 2014	18th	(France) Bruno Irles	22 August 2014
Arles-Avignon	(France) Bruno Irles	Sacked	20 October 2014	19th	(France) Stéphane Crucet	20 October 2014
Ajaccio	(France) Christian Bracconi	Sacked	18 October 2014	12th	(France) Olivier Pantaloni	6 November 2014
Tours	(France) Olivier Pantaloni	Resigned	21 October 2014	20th	(France) Gilbert Zoonekynd	21 October 2014
Créteil	(France) Philippe Hinschberger	Sacked	18 November 2014	18th	(France) Thierry Froger	18 November 2014
Le Havre	(France) Erick Mombaerts	Resigned	10 December 2014	8th	(France) Thierry Goudet	28 December 2014
Arles-Avignon	(France) Stéphane Crucet	Sacked	29 December 2014	20th	(France) Victor Zvunka	1 January 2015
Châteauroux	(France) Pascal Gastien	Sacked	9 February 2015	19th	(France) Cédric Daury	16 February 2015
Valenciennes	(France) Bernard Casoni	Resigned	24 February 2015	17th	(France) David Le Frapper	25 February 2015

== League table ==
Pos	Team	Pld	W	D	L	GF	GA	GD	Pts	Promotion or Relegation
1	Troyes (C, P)	38	24	6	8	61	24	+37	78	Promotion to Ligue 1
2	Gazélec Ajaccio (P)	38	18	11	9	49	37	+12	65	Promotion to Ligue 1
3	Angers (P)	38	18	10	10	47	30	+17	64	Promotion to Ligue 1
4	Dijon	38	17	10	11	44	34	+10	61	
5	Nancy	38	15	13	10	53	39	+14	58	
6	Brest	38	14	15	9	41	27	+14	57	
7	Le Havre	38	14	13	11	47	37	+10	55	
8	Laval	38	11	21	6	41	34	+7	54	
9	Auxerre	38	12	16	10	48	42	+6	52	
10	Sochaux	38	13	13	12	39	37	+2	52	
11	Niort	38	11	17	10	41	42	−1	50	
12	Clermont	38	12	13	13	43	47	−4	49	
13	Nîmes (Note: It was announced on 17 March 2015 that Nîmes would be relegated to the next lower level at the end of the season, as a sanction for match fixing the previous season. The decision was overturned on 20 May 2015.)	38	12	10	16	44	57	−13	46	Relegated in the 17th March 2015 and then readmitted in 20th May 2015.
14	Créteil	38	10	15	13	44	52	−8	45	
15	Tours	38	12	8	18	49	54	−5	44	
16	Valenciennes	38	10	12	16	34	51	−17	42	
17	Ajaccio	38	9	14	15	32	42	−10	41	
18	Orléans (R)	38	9	13	16	36	47	−11	40	Relegation to Championnat National
19	Châteauroux (R)	38	7	11	20	31	63	−32	32	Relegation to Championnat National
20	Arles-Avignon (Note: Administratively relegated to Championnat de France Amateur for failing to guarantee sufficient capital.) (D, R)	38	7	9	22	31	59	−28	30	Relegation to CFA

Source: Ligue 2
Rules for classification: 1) points; 2) goal difference; 3) number of goals scored
(C) Champions; (D) Disqualified; (P) Promoted; (R) Relegated

== Results ==
Home \ Away	ACA	GAZ	ANG	ACAA	AUX	BRS	CHA	CLR	CRE	DIJ	LVL	LHA	NAL	NMS	NRT	ORL	SOC	TOU	TRO	VAL
Ajaccio		0–3	1–1	2–1	1–1	2–1	1–1	1–2	0–1	1–0	0–0	0–1	2–0	0–1	0–0	2–3	0–2	1–0	2–1	2–1
Gazélec Ajaccio	0–2		1–0	3–1	1–1	1–1	1–0	1–1	2–0	2–0	1–0	1–0	1–0	2–0	3–2	3–2	3–0	1–1	0–4	2–0
Angers	1–0	2–0		2–0	0–0	1–2	1–1	3–0	3–0	1–0	2–0	1–0	3–1	3–0	0–0	2–1	0–0	2–0	0–3	0–0
Arles-Avignon	0–0	0–0	1–3		2–4	1–0	0–1	0–0	2–0	0–2	2–3	0–1	1–0	0–1	1–0	4–1	2–2	1–0	0–4	1–2
Auxerre	1–1	0–0	0–1	2–1		0–3	3–1	1–1	2–2	3–0	1–1	2–0	2–2	3–1	1–1	0–1	1–0	2–3	0–1	1–2
Brest	2–1	3–0	0–0	1–0	0–1		3–0	2–1	2–2	0–0	0–0	1–0	2–0	3–1	0–0	1–1	1–1	2–0	2–1	1–0
Châteauroux	0–0	0–2	0–1	1–2	2–1	1–1		3–2	2–2	1–1	1–1	0–0	2–5	2–1	0–1	0–0	1–4	2–1	0–1	3–0
Clermont	1–1	3–4	2–0	3–1	1–1	1–0	3–3		1–0	2–5	0–0	1–0	0–1	3–0	1–1	1–0	0–0	2–2	1–0	0–0
Créteil	3–2	1–1	0–1	2–0	2–2	2–1	3–0	2–2		0–2	1–0	0–0	1–1	2–0	1–1	1–0	1–2	1–4	1–1	0–0
Dijon	3–0	1–1	1–1	1–0	1–0	1–0	0–1	1–0	2–1		1–0	1–1	3–1	4–5	1–0	2–1	1–0	0–3	0–1	1–1
Laval	0–0	0–2	3–2	1–0	1–1	2–2	1–0	3–1	1–1	1–0		1–1	1–1	0–1	1–1	1–1	2–2	2–1	2–1	3–1
Le Havre	2–1	1–1	1–0	2–0	2–1	1–1	1–1	3–1	1–1	1–0	0–1		0–1	2–0	1–1	3–1	1–1	0–1	3–2	3–1
Nancy	2–0	1–0	0–0	1–1	2–1	2–1	6–0	1–2	3–1	1–1	1–1	2–1		0–0	1–2	2–2	1–1	2–1	2–0	0–1
Nîmes	1–1	2–0	3–2	2–2	0–1	0–0	1–0	0–1	0–1	2–2	0–0	3–3	1–1		3–2	0–1	2–1	3–2	1–2	2–0
Niort	1–0	1–1	2–1	1–1	1–1	0–0	3–0	0–0	1–3	1–1	0–3	1–0	1–4	3–2		1–1	0–1	1–1	1–0	3–0
Orléans	1–1	0–1	2–3	1–1	0–0	1–0	1–0	2–1	1–1	0–1	1–1	2–2	0–1	1–1	0–0		1–0	2–1	0–1	0–1
Sochaux	1–1	2–1	1–1	1–0	0–0	0–0	3–0	1–0	2–1	0–1	1–1	0–1	0–2	2–0	2–3	0–1		2–1	0–2	1–1
Tours	0–2	2–1	1–2	2–2	2–3	1–1	1–0	0–1	4–2	0–0	1–1	3–2	1–1	1–2	1–0	4–3	0–1		0–2	1–0
Troyes	2–0	1–1	2–1	4–0	1–2	1–0	4–1	2–0	2–0	1–0	0–0	2–2	1–0	2–0	4–1	1–0	2–0	1–0		0–0
Valenciennes	1–1	2–1	1–0	3–0	1–2	0–1	1–0	2–1	1–1	0–3	2–2	0–4	1–1	2–2	1–3	2–0	1–2	1–2	1–1	

Source: Ligue 2
Legend: Blue = home team win; Yellow = draw; Red = away team win.

== Season statistics ==
=== Top goalscorers ===
As of matches played 22 May 2015

Rank	Player	Club	Goals
1	(France) Mickaël Le Bihan	Le Havre	18
2	(France) Jonathan Kodjia	Angers	15
2	(Ivory Coast) Seydou Koné	Niort	15
4	(Morocco) Youssouf Hadji	Nancy	14
4	(France) Karl Toko Ekambi	Sochaux	14
6	(France) Youssef Adnane	Tours / Brest	13
6	(France) Anthony Le Tallec	Valenciennes	13
8	(France) Nicolas Fauvergue	Ajaccio	12
8	(Mali) Mana Dembélé	Nancy	12
10	(France) Idriss Saadi	Clermont	11
10	(France) Benjamin Nivet	Troyes	11

Source: Official Goalscorers' Standings

== Attendances ==
#	Club	Average
1	Nancy	14,919
2	Troyes	9,659
3	Sochaux	9,290
4	Dijon	8,709
5	Angers	8,622
6	Valenciennes	8,105
7	Stade brestois	7,557
8	Le Havre	7,271
9	AJ auxerroise	6,077
10	Stade lavallois	5,582
11	Tours	5,129
12	Nîmes	5,029
13	Châteauroux	4,975
14	Chamois niortais	4,664
15	Ajaccio	4,182
16	Orléans	4,140
17	Clermont	3,099
18	Créteil	2,433
19	Gazélec	2,308
20	Arles-Avignon	1,397
