= Matthieu Ligoule =

French footballer (born 1983)

Personal information
- Date of birth: 6 March 1983 (age 43)
- Place of birth: Bordeaux, France
- Height: 1.79 m (5 ft 10 in)
- Position: Defensive midfielder

Senior career*
Years	Team	Apps	(Gls)
2001–2010	Libourne-Saint-Seurin	134	(5)
2010–2018	Orléans	205	(4)
Total		339	(9)
- * Club domestic league appearances and goals

Matthieu Ligoule (born 6 March 1983) is a French former professional footballer who played as a defensive midfielder. He played in Ligue 2 with US Orléans and Libourne-Saint-Seurin.

Ligoule's twin brother Sébastien is also a footballer, but has never played at a professional level.

== Career statistics ==
Appearances and goals by club, season and competition
Club	Season	League			Coupe de France		Coupe de la Ligue		Other		Total		Ref.
Club	Season	Division	Apps	Goals	Apps	Goals	Apps	Goals	Apps	Goals	Apps	Goals	Ref.
Libourne-Saint-Seurin	2001–02	CFA Group C					–		–				
Libourne-Saint-Seurin	2002–03	CFA Group D	25	3			–		–		25	3	
Libourne-Saint-Seurin	2003–04	National	1	0			–		–		1	0	
Libourne-Saint-Seurin	2004–05	National	2	0			–		–		2	0	
Libourne-Saint-Seurin	2005–06	National	37	0	2	0	1	0	–		40	0	
Libourne-Saint-Seurin	2006–07	Ligue 2	22	1				0	–		22	1	
Libourne-Saint-Seurin	2007–08	Ligue 2	30	1					–		30	1	
Libourne-Saint-Seurin	2008–09	National	17	0					–		17	0	
Libourne-Saint-Seurin	2009–10	CFA Group C					–		–				
Libourne-Saint-Seurin	Total		134	5	2	0	1	0	0	0	137	5	–
Orléans	2010–11	National	37	2	3	0	–		–		40	2	
Orléans	2011–12	National	32	0	4	0	–		–		36	0	
Orléans	2012–13	National	26	1	0	0	–		–		26	1	
Orléans	2013–14	National	32	1	3	0	–		–		35	1	
Orléans	2014–15	Ligue 2	35	0	2	0	1	0	–		38	0	
Orléans	2015–16	National	11	0	1	0	1	0	–		13	0	
Orléans	2016–17	Ligue 2	29	0	0	0	1	0	2 (Note: Two appearances in relegation playoffs)	0	32	0	
Orléans	2017–18	Ligue 2	3	0	0	0	0	0	–		3	0	
Orléans	Total		205	4	13	0	3	0	2	0	223	4	–
Career total			339	9	15	0	4	0	2	0	360	9	–

== Honours ==
Orléans

- Championnat National: 2013–14
