= Cristian López =

Spanish footballer

Cristian
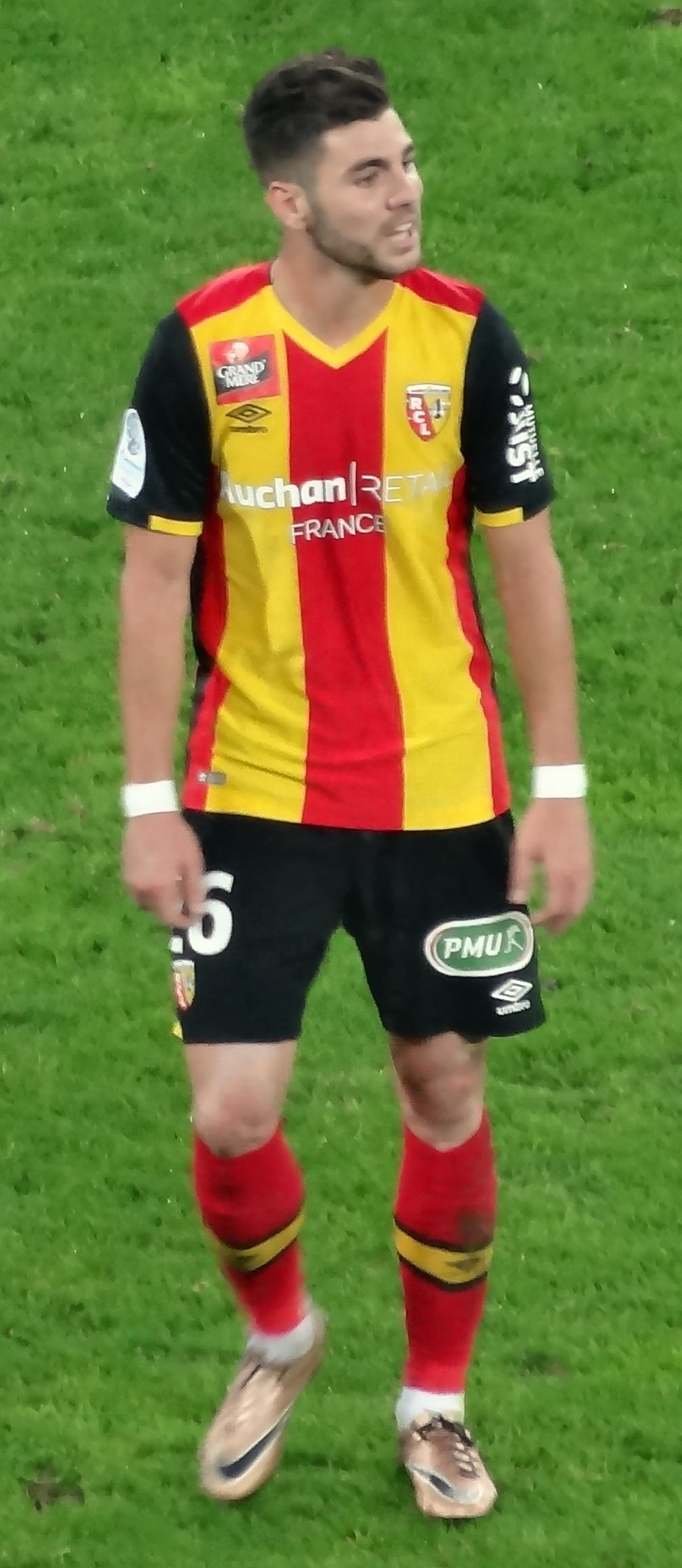
- Cristian with Lens in 2016

Personal information
- Full name: Cristian López Santamaría
- Date of birth: 27 April 1989 (age 37)
- Place of birth: Crevillent, Spain
- Height: 1.85 m (6 ft 1 in)
- Position: Forward

Youth career
- 1999–2002: Crevillente
- 2002–2003: Hércules
- 2003–2007: Crevillente
- 2007–2009: Alicante

Senior career*
Years	Team	Apps	(Gls)
2008–2009	Alicante	8	(2)
2009–2011	Real Madrid B	44	(10)
2011	→ Valencia B (loan)	16	(11)
2011–2012	Valencia B	31	(11)
2012–2013	Atlético Baleares	35	(9)
2013–2014	Huddersfield Town	2	(0)
2013	→ Shrewsbury Town (loan)	5	(1)
2014	→ Northampton Town (loan)	3	(0)
2014–2015	Burgos	36	(13)
2015–2016	CFR Cluj	44	(16)
2016–2018	Lens	63	(26)
2018–2019	Angers	19	(2)
2019–2020	Hatta	12	(5)
2020	Las Palmas	10	(0)
2020–2022	Aris	25	(1)
2021	→ Cartagena (loan)	11	(1)
2022–2023	Eldense	24	(4)
2023–2024	Ceuta	6	(0)
Total		394	(112)
- * Club domestic league appearances and goals

Cristian López Santamaría (born 27 April 1989), known simply as Cristian, is a Spanish former professional footballer who played as a forward.

== Club career ==
=== Alicante ===
Born in Crevillent, Alicante, Valencian Community, Cristian played for several clubs as a youth, including local Crevillente Deportivo and Alicante CF. He made his debut for the latter's first team during the 2007–08 season, as they returned to Segunda División after a 50-year absence.

In the following campaign, Cristian continued playing mostly with the reserves in the Tercera División, with the main squad finally being relegated. He made his division two debut in a game against Hércules CF on 6 June 2009, scoring in a 1–2 local derby home loss.

=== Castilla and Mestalla ===
López signed for Real Madrid Castilla in the summer of 2009, with Real Madrid's reserves in the third division. He finished his first year with ten goals – second-best in the squad – as the team finished eighth in the league.

In January 2011, Cristian signed for Valencia CF's B team in the fourth level, in a season-long loan. He scored in double digits as the Che reserves returned to the third tier at the first attempt, and the move was made permanent in the summer. He added a further 11 goals the following campaign, including four as they won 4–2 at UE Sant Andreu on 13 May 2012.

Cristian spent 2012–13 still in division three, with CD Atlético Baleares. He ranked top scorer for the Palma de Mallorca-based side, scoring twice on 31 March 2013 in a 3–0 home win over city rivals RCD Mallorca B.

=== Huddersfield ===
On 24 July 2013, trialist Cristian played for Huddersfield Town against Real Betis, in a 4–2 friendly loss at the John Smith's Stadium, and he scored in the next pre-season match with Oldham Athletic (3–2 defeat). The following week he signed a one-year deal with the Terriers, taking the number 19 shirt vacated by Alan Lee.

Cristian made his Football League Championship on 3 August 2013, coming on as a substitute in a 1–0 defeat at Nottingham Forest – in the process, he became the club's first ever Spanish player in its 105-year history. On 10 October, however, he joined Football League One side Shrewsbury Town on a month's loan, becoming the first Spaniard to sign for the club. He scored his first goal for them and in English football on the 22nd, in a 1–1 draw against Colchester United at the New Meadow, but returned to Huddersfield on 5 November following an injury crisis to its attacking sector.

On 14 March 2014, López moved to League Two's Northampton Town, on loan for the rest of the season. He was released by Huddersfield in May.

=== Burgos and CFR Cluj ===
On 17 July 2014, Cristian joined Burgos CF in the third tier, eventually helping his team to a mid-table finish. He received a straight red card on 11 October 2014 in a goalless draw at CD Guijuelo, for a 15th-minute high challenge on Juli Ferrer.

Cristian moved abroad for the second time in June 2015, signing with Romanian Liga I's CFR Cluj. He made his top-flight debut on 11 July, replacing Guima for the final 20 minutes of a 2–2 draw at FC Viitorul Constanța in the opening game of the season. A month later, he scored his first goal for the Feroviarii, the game's only at the Stadionul Dr. Constantin Rădulescu against FC Petrolul Ploiești, four minutes after coming on for Leo Beleck.

On 31 August 2015, Cristian recorded a hat-trick in a 3–1 home win over FC Botoșani. The following 17 May, in the final of the Cupa României, he came on at half-time for Tomislav Gomelt and headed a last-minute equaliser as CFR came from behind to draw 2–2 against FC Dinamo București before winning in a penalty shootout.

=== Lens ===
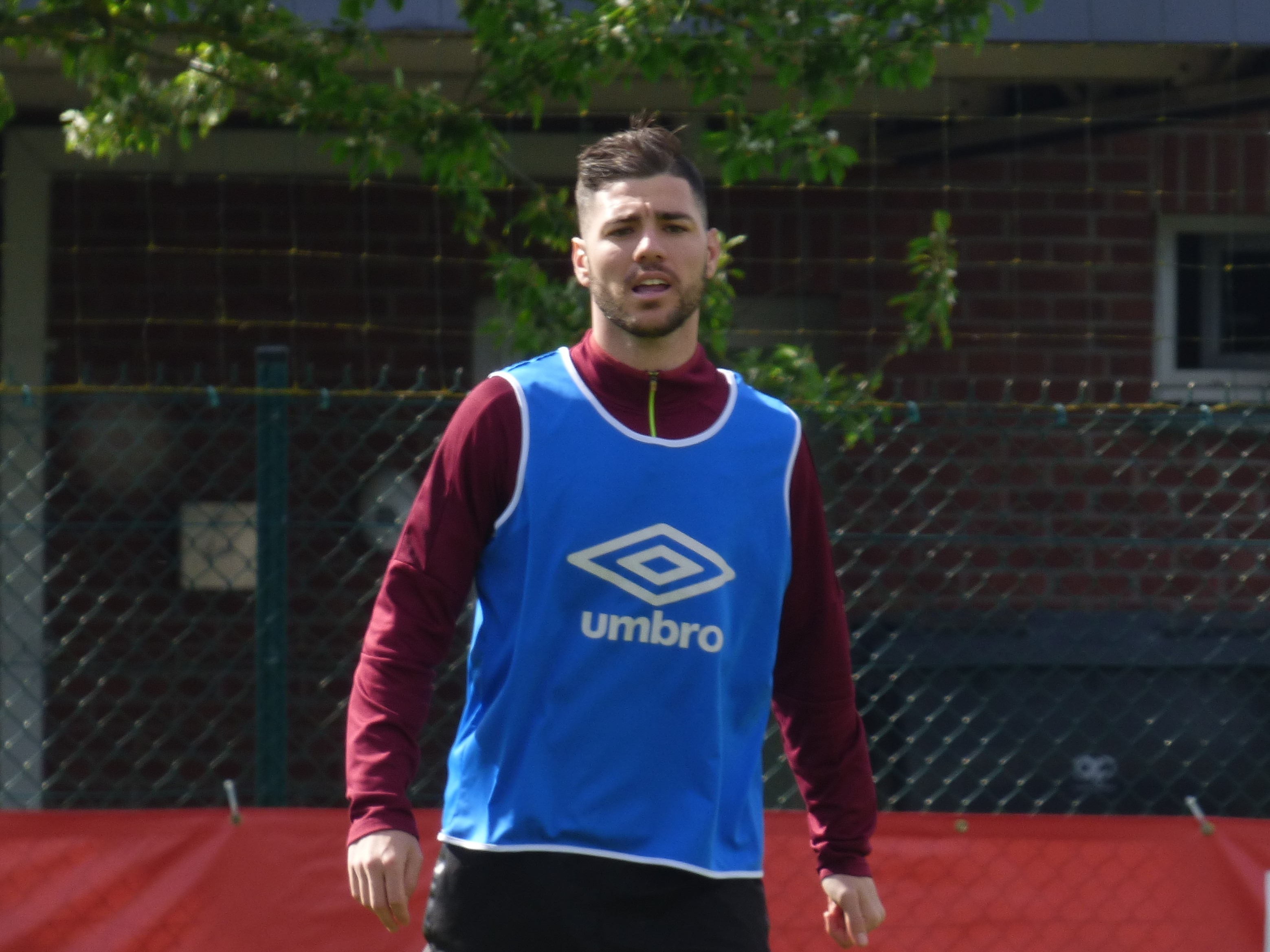
Cristian training with Lens in May 2018

Cristian switched countries again on 31 August 2016, when he joined Ligue 2 club RC Lens on a one-year deal with the option for a second. He made his debut nine days later, replacing Kévin Fortuné for the final ten minutes of a 1–1 home draw with FC Bourg-Pérronas, and scored his first goal on 20 September in a 4–2 victory over US Orléans also at the Stade Bollaert-Delelis. The team finished fourth, one point off promotion, and he was joint-third amongst scorers with 16 goals.

Cristian scored eight times in the first half of the 2017–18 season. He then embarked on a drought which lasted until the final two fixtures against Tours FC and AJ Auxerre, and fans petitioned for him to be given a new contract.

=== Angers ===
On 31 August 2018, the last day of the 2018 summer transfer window, free agent Cristian signed a one-year contract with Angers SCO. His maiden appearance in Ligue 1 took place on 6 October, when he played the last eight minutes of a 2–2 home draw to RC Strasbourg Alsace. He scored his first goal late in same month, but in a 1–2 loss against Olympique Lyonnais.

=== Hatta and Las Palmas ===
On 19 August 2019, Cristian agreed to a one-year deal at UAE Pro-League's Hatta Club. The following 1 March, he signed with Spanish second-division side UD Las Palmas for the rest of the season with the option of one more.

=== Aris ===
Cristian signed a two-year contract with Aris Thessaloniki F.C. on 26 August 2020. He scored in his Super League Greece debut, equalising against PAS Lamia 1964 in an eventual 3–1 home win.

On 1 February 2021, Cristian joined FC Cartagena on loan until 30 June.

=== Eldense ===
On 8 August 2022, López returned to his home country and moved to Primera Federación club CD Eldense. Mainly a backup, he contributed four goals in 27 total matches in his only season, in a return to the second tier after 59 years.

== Career statistics ==
As of match played 2 February 2022

Appearances and goals by club, season and competition
Club	Season	League			Cup		League Cup		Continental		Other		Total	
Club	Season	Division	Apps	Goals	Apps	Goals	Apps	Goals	Apps	Goals	Apps	Goals	Apps	Goals
Alicante	2007–08	Segunda División B	5	0	0	0	—		—		—		5	0
Alicante	2008–09	Segunda División	3	2	0	0	—		—		—		3	2
Alicante	Total		8	2	0	0	—		—		—		8	2
Real Madrid B	2009–10	Segunda División B	33	10	—		—		—		—		33	10
Real Madrid B	2010–11	Segunda División B	11	0	—		—		—		—		11	0
Real Madrid B	Total		44	10	—		—		—		—		44	10
Valencia B (loan)	2011–12	Segunda División B	31	11	—		—		—		—		31	11
Atlético Baleares	2012–13	Segunda División B	35	9	0	0	—		—		—		35	9
Huddersfield Town	2013–14	Championship	2	0	2	0	—		—		—		4	0
Shrewsbury Town (loan)	2013–14	League One	5	1	0	0	—		—		—		5	1
Northampton Town (loan)	2013–14	League Two	3	0	0	0	—		—		—		3	0
Burgos	2014–15	Segunda División B	36	13	0	0	—		—		—		36	13
CFR Cluj	2015–16	Liga I	38	12	3	1	2	1	—		—		43	14
CFR Cluj	2016–17	Liga I	6	4	0	0	1	0	—		1	0	8	4
CFR Cluj	Total		44	16	3	1	3	1	—		1	0	51	18
Lens	2016–17	Ligue 2	30	16	2	1	0	0	—		—		32	17
Lens	2017–18	Ligue 2	33	10	4	4	2	2	—		—		39	16
Lens	Total		63	26	6	5	2	2	—		—		71	33
Angers	2018–19	Ligue 1	19	2	0	0	1	0	—		—		20	2
Hatta	2019–20	UAE Pro League	12	5	0	0	—		—		—		12	5
Las Palmas	2019–20	Segunda División	10	0	—		—		—		—		10	0
Aris	2020–21	Super League Greece	18	1	0	0	—		1	0	—		19	1
Aris	2021–22	Super League Greece	7	0	2	0	—		—		—		9	0
Aris	Total		25	1	2	0	—		1	0	—		28	1
Career total			337	96	13	6	6	3	1	0	1	0	358	105

== Honours ==
Valencia B

- Tercera División: 2010–11

CFR Cluj

- Cupa României: 2015–16
