= Alliou Dembélé =

French footballer (born 1988)

Personal information
- Date of birth: 1 February 1988 (age 38)
- Place of birth: Cergy-Pontoise, France
- Height: 1.68 m (5 ft 6 in)
- Position: Midfielder

Team information
- Current team: Virton
- Number: 13

Youth career
- Paris Saint-Germain

Senior career*
Years	Team	Apps	(Gls)
2009–2011	RC France		
2011–2013	Épinal	55	(0)
2013–2014	Gazélec Ajaccio	23	(3)
2014–2015	Boulogne	32	(3)
2015–2016	Bourg-Péronnas	38	(1)
2016–2018	Niort	69	(1)
2018–2019	Ajaccio	16	(0)
2019–2021	Laval	53	(1)
2021–2022	Stade Briochin	17	(1)
2022–2023	Bourg-Péronnas	39	(1)
2023	Amiens B		
2024	Cholet	18	(1)
2024–2025	Andrézieux	24	(0)
2025–	Virton	28	(0)
- * Club domestic league appearances and goals as of 28 June 2026

Alliou Dembélé (born 1 February 1988) is a French footballer who plays as a midfielder for Virton.

== Career ==
On 26 January 2022, Dembélé returned to Bourg-en-Bresse on a 18-months contract.

On 10 July 2024, Dembélé signed for Championnat National 2 club Andrézieux.

== Personal life ==
Alliou Dembélé is of Malian descent. He was born in Cergy-Pontoise, France and has French nationality.

== Career statistics ==
As of match played 27 August 2021

Appearances and goals by club, season and competition
Club	Season	League			Coupe de France		Coupe de la Ligue		Total	
Club	Season	Division	Apps	Goals	Apps	Goals	Apps	Goals	Apps	Goals
Épinal	2011–12	Championnat National	21	0	0	0	—		21	0
Épinal	2012–13	Championnat National	34	0	3	0	—		37	0
Épinal	Total		55	0	3	0	0	0	58	0
Gazélec Ajaccio	2013–14	Championnat National	23	3	0	0	1	0	24	3
Boulogne	2014–15	Championnat National	32	3	5	0	—		37	3
Bourg-en-Bresse	2015–16	Ligue 2	38	1	3	0	4	0	45	1
Niort	2016–17	Ligue 2	35	1	4	0	0	0	39	1
Niort	2017–18	Ligue 2	34	0	3	0	1	0	38	0
Niort	Total		69	1	7	0	1	0	77	1
Gazélec Ajaccio	2018–19	Ligue 2	16	0	1	0	2	0	19	0
Laval	2019–20	Championnat National	23	0	1	0	—		24	0
Laval	2020–21	Championnat National	30	1	2	0	—		32	1
Laval	Total		53	1	3	0	0	0	56	1
Stade Briochin	2021–22	Championnat National	4	0	0	0	—		4	0
Career total			290	9	22	0	8	0	320	9
