= David Guion =

French footballer and manager (born 1967)

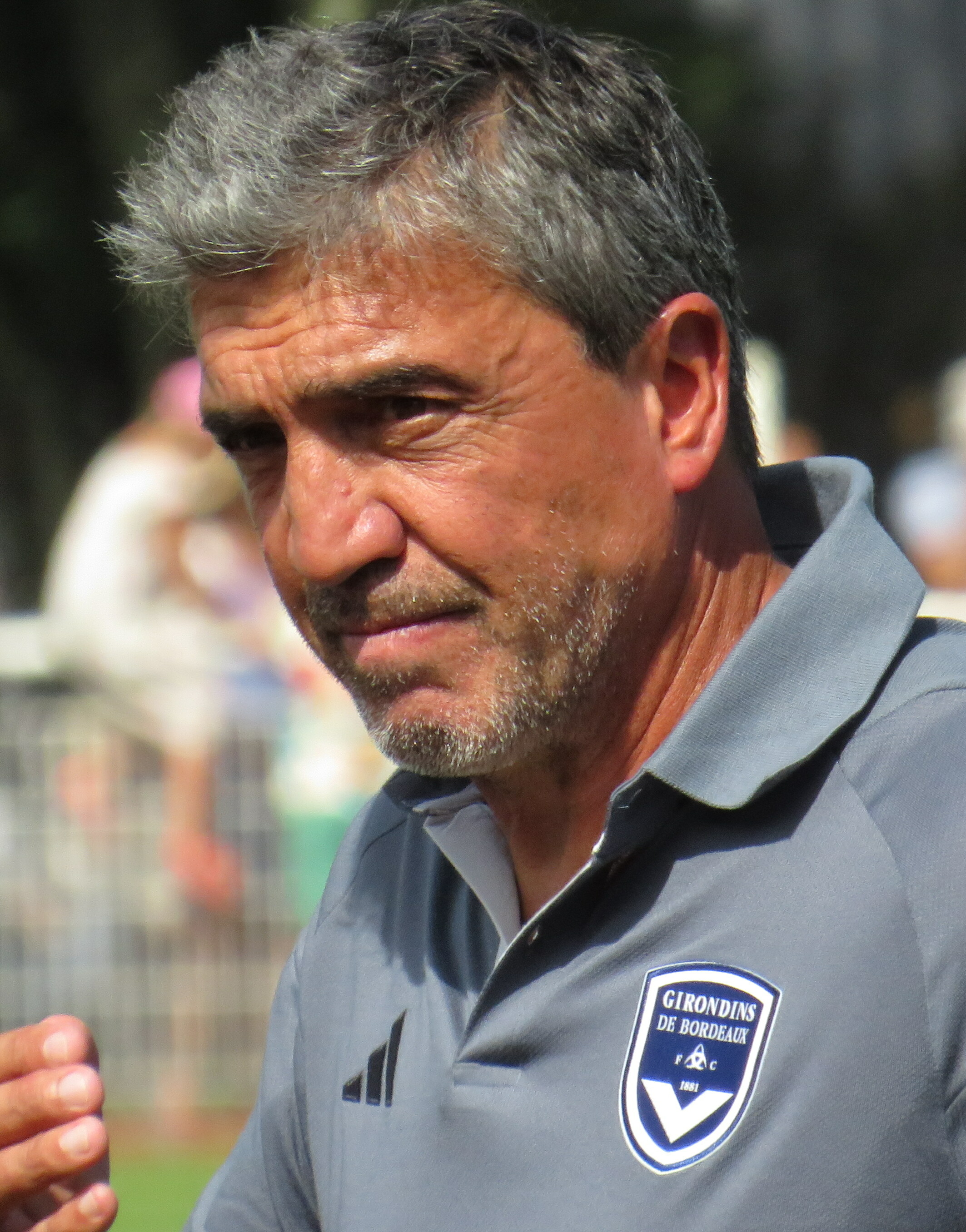
- Guion as Bordeaux manager in 2023

Personal information
- Date of birth: 30 September 1967 (age 59)
- Place of birth: Le Mans, France
- Height: 1.77 m (5 ft 10 in)
- Position: Defender

Team information
- Current team: Clermont (manager)

Senior career*
Years	Team	Apps	(Gls)
1983–1988	Lille B	88	(1)
1988–1991	Lille	51	(0)
1991–1994	Angers	90	(1)
1994–1995	Sedan	26	(1)
1995–1997	Mulhouse	60	(1)
1997–1999	Red Star	69	(1)
1999–2001	Istres	71	(3)
Total		455	(8)

Managerial career
- 2010–2011: Chambéry
- 2011–2012: Cannes
- 2012: Boulogne (assistant)
- 2012–2017: Reims (youth)
- 2012–2017: Reims B
- 2016: Reims (caretaker)
- 2017–2021: Reims
- 2022–2023: Bordeaux
- 2023–2024: Troyes
- 2026–: Clermont
- * Club domestic league appearances and goals

David Guion (born 30 September 1967) is a French professional football manager and former player who played as a defender. He is the manager of Ligue 2 club Clermont.

== Early life ==
Guion was born in Le Mans, Sarthe.

== Club career ==
Guion began his playing career in the B team at Lille in 1983. He went on to represent the Lille first team, making 51 appearances between 1988 and 1991. Guion then spent three seasons with Angers, where he played 88 league matches and scored once. He was also a part of the team that won promotion to Ligue 1 in 1993. He returned to Ligue 2 in 1994 with Sedan and went on to play for Mulhouse and Red Star 93, before ending his career with Istres in 2001.

== Managerial career ==
Guion was appointed manager of Chambéry in the summer of 2010, and led the team to promotion to the Championnat de France amateur in his first season in charge. He was subsequently hired by Cannes in June 2011, but left the club in January 2012 after winning only 5 of his first 13 games as manager. Guion was appointed as assistant manager under Pascal Plancque at Boulogne the following month.

On 6 December 2023, Guion was hired by Troyes in Ligue 2.

On 24 June 2026, Guion signed a two-year contract with Ligue 2 club Clermont.

== Managerial statistics ==
As of match played 20 November 2026

Managerial record by team and tenure
Team	From	To	Record							
Team	From	To	G	W	D	L	GF	GA	GD	Win %
Chambéry	1 July 2010	8 June 2011	40	28	6	6	93	34	+59	70.00
Cannes	1 July 2011	1 January 2012	13	5	3	5	19	16	+3	38.46
Reims	23 April 2016	30 June 2016	3	1	0	2	6	5	+1	33.33
Reims	22 May 2017	25 May 2021	157	65	51	41	199	158	+41	41.40
Bordeaux	17 February 2022	7 October 2023	65	27	17	21	82	76	+6	41.54
Troyes	6 December 2023	6 August 2024	21	5	7	9	23	33	−10	23.81
Clermont	24 June 2026	present	14	2	8	4	18	19	−1	14.29
Total			313	133	92	88	441	339	+102	42.49

== Honours ==
=== Player ===
Angers

- Division 2 Group B: 1992–93

=== Manager ===
Chambéry

- Championnat de France Amateur 2 Group D: 2010–11

Reims

- Ligue Champagne-Ardenne: 2012–13
- Championnat de France Amateur 2: 2015–16
- Ligue 2: 2017–18

Individual

- Ligue 2 Manager of the Year: 2017–18
