= Bernard Blaquart =

French footballer (born 1957)

Personal information
- Date of birth: 16 August 1957 (age 69)
- Place of birth: Roumazières-Loubert, France
- Height: 1.74 m (5 ft 9 in)
- Position: Forward

Senior career*
Years	Team	Apps	(Gls)
1976–1981	Bordeaux	52	(5)
1978–1979	→ Toulouse (loan)	23	(0)
1981–1983	Toulon	14	(2)
1983–1984	Stade Français	5	(0)
Total		94	(7)

Managerial career
- 1984–1991: Lunel
- 1992–1994: Nord Lozère
- 1994–1995: Montluçon
- 1996–1998: Perrier Verzège
- 1998–2004: Lunel
- 2006: Grenoble
- 2012–2013: Tours
- 2015–2020: Nîmes
- * Club domestic league appearances and goals

Bernard Blaquart (born 16 August 1957) is a French former professional footballer who was most recently the manager of Ligue 1 side Nîmes Olympique. During his playing career he represented Bordeaux, Toulouse, Toulon and Stade Français, making almost 100 appearances in the top two divisions of French football.

Following his retirement from playing, Blaquart moved into management and coached a number of lower-league clubs including Lunel and Montluçon before joining Ligue 2 outfit Grenoble as reserve team manager in 2004. He was appointed as manager of the senior team for the last 8 matches of the 2005–06 season following the departure of Thierry Goudet to Brest, and led the side to a 10th-place finish before returning to his post with the reserves. In 2008, he became Head of Youth Development at Grenoble and held the position for two years before taking up a similar role at Tours. In August 2012, he was given the manager's job at Tours on a full-time basis, replacing the outgoing German coach Peter Zeidler.
