= Olivier Frapolli =

French footballer and manager (born 1971)

Personal information
- Date of birth: 27 September 1971 (age 55)
- Place of birth: Hyères, France
- Height: 1.83 m (6 ft 0 in)
- Position: Sweeper

Team information
- Current team: Grenoble (manager)

Youth career
- 1978–1984: Vitrolles
- 1984–1988: Aix-en-Provence
- 1988–1991: Toulouse

Senior career*
Years	Team	Apps	(Gls)
1991–1996	Toulouse	54	(0)
1994–1995	→ Perpignan (loan)	32	(1)
1995–1996	→ Stade Poitevin (loan)	33	(0)
1996–1999	Beauvais Oise	118	(1)
1999–2001	Martigues	60	(1)
2001–2004	Créteil	61	(1)

International career
1993	France U21	3	(0)

Managerial career
- 2003–2006: Créteil II
- 2006: Créteil (interim)
- 2008–2009: Créteil
- 2010: Sénart-Moissy
- 2011–2012: Orléans II
- 2012–2016: Orléans
- 2017–2019: Boulogne
- 2019–2026: Laval
- 2026–: Grenoble
- * Club domestic league appearances and goals

Olivier Frapolli (born 27 September 1971) is a French professional football manager and former player who is the manager of Ligue 2 club Grenoble.

== Club career ==
Frapolli began playing football at the age of 5 and went through the youth academy in Aix-en-Provence. As a youth, he often played against Zinedine Zidane in regional tournaments before playing together representing the Mediterranean leagues. He joined Toulouse's youth academy in 1988, which was noted for its strong youth development. He roomed with Fabien Barthez at their training center. He was promoted to Toulouse's senior team in 1992 and made 50 appearances in Division 1.

In the 1993–94 season, Toulouse was relegated, and Frapolli was not in his coach's plans. He agreed to join Perpignan on loan in the Ligue 2 in 1994, and then to Stade Poitevin the following season. He moved to Beauvais Oise from 1996 to 1999 and then Martigues for a couple of seasons. He joined Créteil on 6 June 2001 and ended his career with them in 2004.

== International career ==
Frapolli was a youth international for France, having represented the France U21 in 1993.

== Managerial career ==
On 20 April 2003, Frapolli started the process of earning his coaching badges in France. In the tail-end of his career, he was demoted to the reserves of Créteil, and became their captain and then player-manager in December 2003. He helped Créteil II win the 2005-2006 Championnat de France Amateur 2. On 16 September 2006, he was named the interim manager at the senior Créteil side for 4 games after Albert Rust was sacked. He was thereafter named assistant at Créteil for 2 years under Artur Jorge and then Thierry Goudet. In April 2008, Goudet was sacked and Frapolli was named manager in the Championnat National.

In June 2009, he almost joined FC Fleury 91 but had to pull out due to family emergency. He became supervisor at Cannes for 6 months after in 2009. He became manager at Sénart-Moissy in 2010, helping them avoid relegation in the Championnat de France Amateur 2 and win a regional Parisian trophy.

In June 2010, he was named Yann Lachuer's assistant at the Ligue 2 club Orléans. He was named the coach of their reserves in the 2011–12 season, and then was named coach of the senior team in the summer of 2012 when Lachuer was sacked. He helped the club win the 2013–14 Championnat National and achieve promotion to the Ligue 2 for the first time in 22 years, and was named the Coach of the Season by the managers of the league. The team was relegated from Ligue 2 the following season, finishing in 18th. He extended his contract with Orléans on 25 May 2016 for 2 years, keeping his club's confidence, on the condition that he reachieved promotion to the Ligue 2. He again achieved promotion in the 2015–16 season, coming in second place to Strasbourg. In December 2016, he was sacked after a bad start to the Ligue 2, but was recognized for his ability to scout players.

In the summer of 2017, he moved to Boulogne in the Championnat National until 2019. In May 2019, he was controversially poached by Laval and signed a 2-year contract. After a couple difficult seasons, he helped Laval win 2021–22 Championnat National and achieved promotion into the Ligue 2 once more, and was again named Manager of the Season.

On 11 June 2026, Frapolli was hired by Grenoble in Ligue 2.

== Personal life ==
Frapolli wished to become an architect as a youth, and hoped to play football secondarily. He graduated with a Baccalauréat économique et social, and then received a Brevet d'État d'éducateur sportif in 1989. He has three children.

== Honours ==
Créteil II

- Championnat de France Amateur 2 : 2005–06

Orléans

- Championnat National: 2013–14

Laval

- Championnat National: 2021–22
