= Fabien Mercadal =

French footballer and manager (born 1972)

Personal information
- Date of birth: 29 February 1972 (age 54)
- Place of birth: Manosque, France
- Position: Defender

Team information
- Current team: Martinique (head coach)

Senior career*
Years	Team	Apps	(Gls)
1989–1991	AC Digne		
1991–1994	Marseille B		
1994–1995	Gap		
1995–1997	Évry FC		
1997–1999	Saint-Georges		
1999–2000	Gap		
2000–2002	Manosque		
2002–2004	Gap		

Managerial career
- 2004–2005: Gap (assistant)
- 2005–2008: Gap
- 2008–2012: Amiens (assistant)
- 2012–2016: Dunkerque
- 2016–2017: Tours
- 2017–2018: Paris FC
- 2018–2019: Caen
- 2019: Cercle Brugge
- 2020–2021: Dunkerque
- 2022: Quevilly-Rouen
- 2025–: Martinique
- * Club domestic league appearances and goals

Fabien Mercadal (born 29 February 1972) is a French former professional football manager and former player who played as a defender. He is currently the head coach of Martinique national football team.

After an amateur playing career, he began managing in the fourth tier with Gap, going on to spend one season in Ligue 1 with Caen in 2018–19. He also led Tours, Paris FC, Dunkerque and Quevilly-Rouen in Ligue 2 and had a brief spell in the Belgian First Division A with Cercle Brugge.

== Playing career ==
Mercadal was born in Manosque, Alpes-de-Haute-Provence, to a Corsican father who had played in Division 3 for AJ Auxerre. Mercadal himself was in the youth ranks of Olympique de Marseille but suffered an injury that limited him to playing in the third and fourth divisions.

== Managerial career ==
=== Early years and Tours ===
Mercadal began his managerial career as an assistant at his final playing club, Gap FC, before being their head coach between 2005 and 2008 in the fourth-tier Championnat de France Amateur. For the next four years he was assistant at Amiens SC in Ligue 2 and the Championnat National; he was interim manager on 23 October 2009 in a 1–0 loss at ES Troyes AC. Known for his passion, he vomited after defeat in his early career.

In June 2012, Mercadal was hired at fourth-tier USL Dunkerque, winning promotion in his first season. After coming 5th, 6th and 6th in the third tier, he was appointed at Tours FC in Ligue 2 in June 2016. He drew 0–0 at home to Ajaccio on his professional career debut on 29 July, and was dismissed on 18 February 2017 with his team in last.

=== Paris FC ===
Mercadal found another job in Ligue 2 in June 2017, being hired by Paris FC, who had been restored to the division after the administrative relegation of SC Bastia. He came 8th in his one season at the Stade Charléty, and was eliminated from the eighth round of the Coupe de France 3–2 at third-tier Entente SSG.

=== Caen ===
On 8 June 2018, Mercadal was announced as the manager of Ligue 1 side Stade Malherbe Caen on a three-year deal, with Paris FC being compensated for the last year of his contract. His top-flight debut on 12 August was a 3–0 loss at reigning champions Paris Saint-Germain FC. His team reached the quarter-finals of the Coupe de France via a 7–5 win at Bastia on 5 February 2019. He left by mutual consent on 25 May, after a 1–0 home loss to FC Girondins de Bordeaux on the final day and relegation to Ligue 2.

=== Cercle Brugge and Ligue 2 return ===
In July 2019, Mercadal was hired in the first foreign job of his career, at Cercle Brugge K.S.V. in the Belgian First Division A. He was fired on 7 October after losing nine of ten league games and losing 1–0 at home to fourth-tier R.U.S. Rebecquoise in the sixth round of the Belgian Cup.

On 16 May 2020, Mercadal returned to Dunkerque on a two-year contract, with the team newly promoted to Ligue 2. Having avoided the relegation play-off on goal difference in his one season back at the Stade Marcel-Tribut, he left by mutual consent.

Mercadal returned to work in Ligue 2 on 4 January 2022 at Quevilly-Rouen, signing an 18-month deal at the 11th-placed club. In May he received a four-match ban, of which two were suspended, for an obscene gesture on his return to Caen. He left for personal reasons at the end of the month.

== Managerial statistics ==
As of match played 5 October 2019

Managerial record by team and tenure
Team	Nat	From	To	Record							
Team	Nat	From	To	G	W	D	L	GF	GA	GD	Win %
Gap	(France)	1 July 2005	1 July 2008	104	42	38	24	150	110	+40	40.38
Dunkerque	(France)	3 June 2012	7 June 2016	155	73	45	37	227	142	+85	47.10
Tours	(France)	13 June 2016	18 February 2017	27	4	9	14	30	45	−15	14.81
Paris FC	(France)	21 June 2017	2 June 2018	42	17	14	11	51	41	+10	40.48
Caen	(France)	8 June 2018	25 May 2019	43	9	13	21	40	62	−22	20.93
Cercle Brugge	(Belgium)	19 June 2019	7 October 2019	11	1	0	10	8	28	−20	9.09
Total				382	146	119	117	506	428	+78	38.22
