= Hervé Della Maggiore =

French footballer and coach (born 1972)

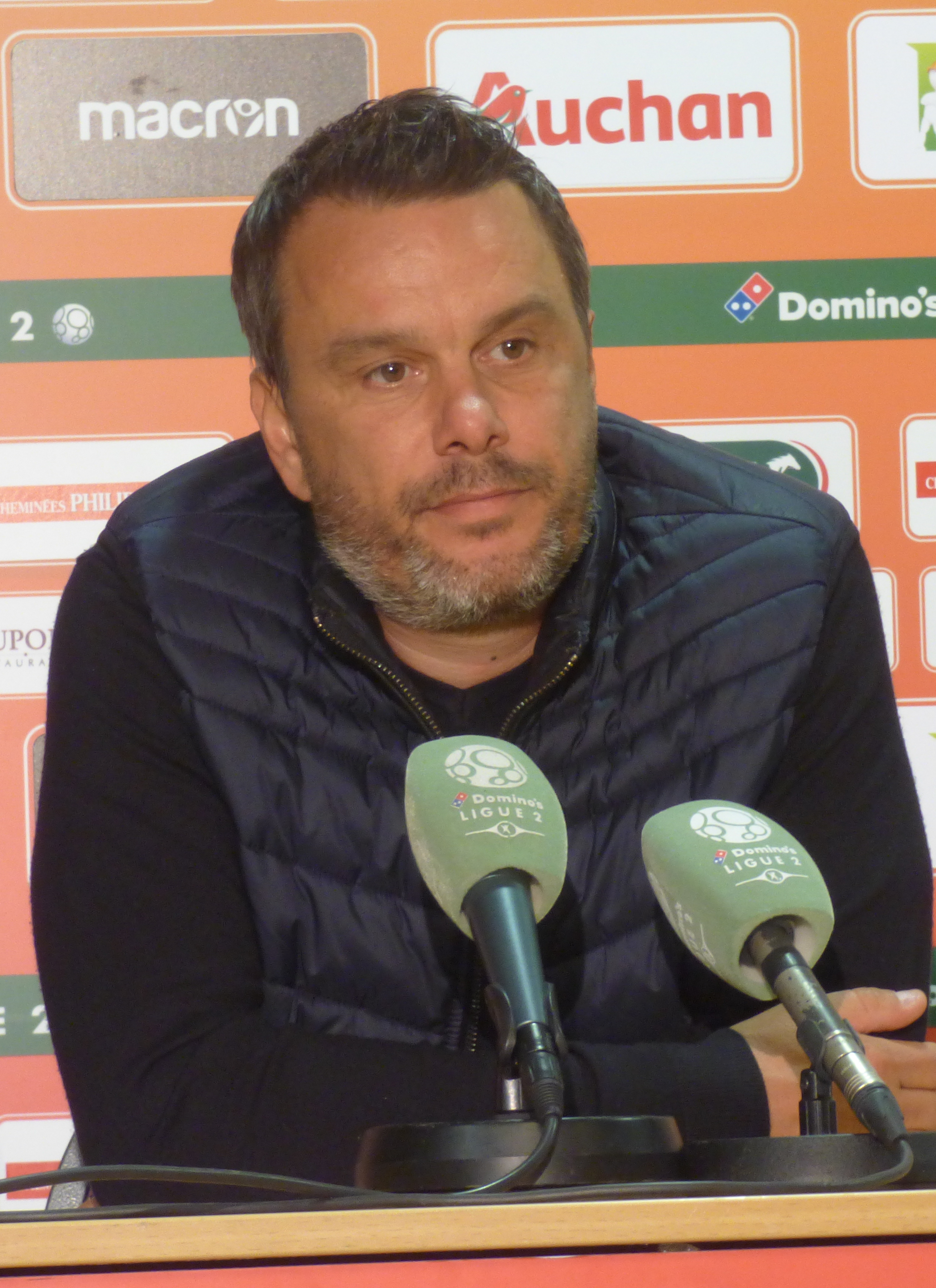
- Della Maggiore in 2018

Personal information
- Date of birth: 17 August 1972 (age 54)
- Place of birth: Rillieux-la-Pape, France
- Height: 1.79 m (5 ft 10 in)
- Position: Midfielder

Team information
- Current team: Orléans (manager)

Youth career
- Lyon

Senior career*
Years	Team	Apps	(Gls)
1995–1996	Lyon-Duchère		
1996–2000	Saint-Priest		
2000–2002	Ain Sud		

Managerial career
- 2008–2018: Bourg-en-Bresse
- 2018–2019: Gazélec Ajaccio
- 2021–2023: Villefranche
- 2023–2024: Bourg-en-Bresse (director)
- 2024: Bourg-en-Bresse
- 2024–: Orléans
- * Club domestic league appearances and goals

Hervé Della Maggiore (born 17 August 1972) is a French football coach and a former midfielder. He is the manager of Ligue 3 club Orléans.

== Managerial career ==
Della Maggiore was a youth product of Olympique Lyonnais, and had an unassuming career as a semi-amateur footballer. Della Maggiore began his managerial career with Bourg-en-Bresse in 2008, when the team played in the Championnat National 3, the fifth division in French football. During his tenure, he helped Bourg-en-Bresse reach the Ligue 2, becoming the first team in the Ain département in France to do so.

He left Bourg-en-Bresse after the club were relegated to the Championnat National in 2018.

In October 2018, he joined Gazélec Ajaccio as the new manager. He left at the end of the 2018–19 season after the club lost the Ligue 2 relegation play-off and were relegated to Championnat National.

On 11 February 2021, he was named as the new coach of Villefranche in the Championnat National

On 13 June 2024, Della Maggiore signed a two-year contract with Orléans.

== Managerial statistics ==
As of match played 4 February 2019

Managerial record by team and tenure
Team	Nat	From	To	Record							
Team	Nat	From	To	G	W	D	L	GF	GA	GD	Win %
Bourg-en-Bresse	(France)	6 June 2008	3 June 2018	397	159	102	136	562	534	+28	40.05
Gazélec Ajaccio	(France)	15 October 2018	Present	16	6	3	7	12	20	−8	37.50
Total				413	165	105	143	574	554	+20	39.95

== Personal life ==
Della Maggiore was born in Lyon to an affluent Italian family.
