= Jimmy Nirlo =

French footballer (born 1988)

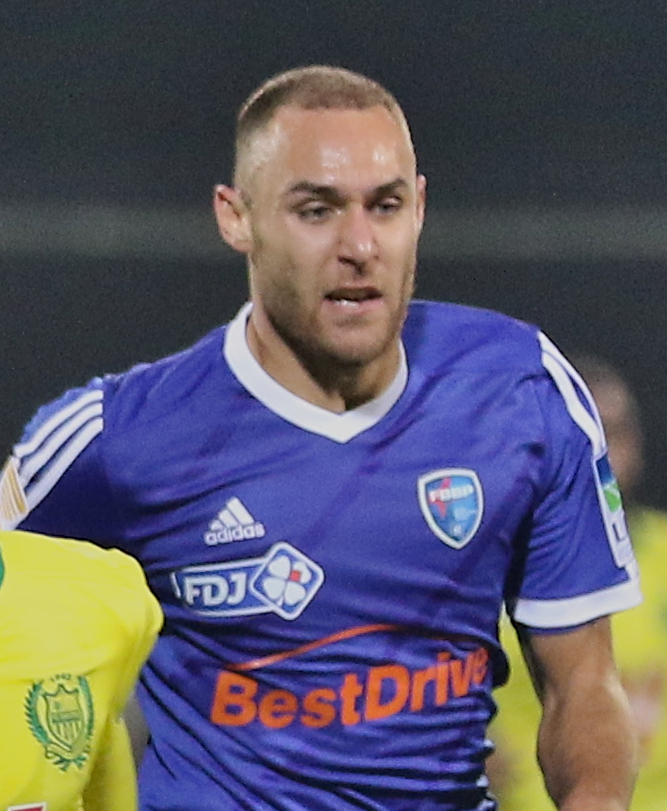
- Jimmy Nirlo in 2015

Personal information
- Date of birth: 23 August 1988 (age 38)
- Place of birth: Oyonnax, France
- Height: 1.83 m (6 ft 0 in)
- Position: Midfielder

Team information
- Current team: Bourgoin-Jallieu
- Number: 15

Senior career*
Years	Team	Apps	(Gls)
2005–2006	Jura Sud	27	(3)
2006–2009	Rennes	0	(0)
2009	Veria		
2009–2011	Pacy-sur-Eure	68	(1)
2011–2012	Créteil	35	(2)
2012–2013	Bourg-Péronnas	31	(1)
2013	Le Poiré-sur-Vie	7	(0)
2013–2021	Bourg-Péronnas	244	(4)
2021–2023	Villefranche	57	(6)
2023–	Bourgoin-Jallieu	3	(0)
- * Club domestic league appearances and goals as of 7 October 2023

Jimmy Nirlo (born 23 August 1988) is a French professional footballer who plays for Bourgoin-Jallieu as a midfielder.

== Club career ==
On 27 May 2021, he signed with Villefranche.

On 23 June 2023, Nirlo joined Bourgoin-Jallieu in Championnat National 2.
