= US Orléans =

French association football club

Orléans
- Full name: Union Sportive Orléans Loiret Football
- Nicknames: USO; Les Guêpes (The Wasps)
- Founded: 1976; 50 years ago 1889; 137 years ago as Arago Sport Orléanais
- Ground: Stade de la Source, Orléans
- Capacity: 7,533
- Chairman: Cyril Courtin
- Manager: Hervé Della Maggiore
- League: Ligue 3
- 2025–26: Championnat National, 6th of 17
- Website: orleansloiretfoot.com
Home colours	Away colours

Union Sportive Orléans Loiret Football (pronounced [ynjɔ̃ spɔʁtiv ɔʁleɑ̃]; commonly referred to as US Orléans, Orléans or simply, USO; pronounced [y.ɛs.o]) is a French association football club based in Orléans. The club was founded in 1976 and currently play in Championnat National after being relegated from the prematurely-ended 2019–20 Ligue 2. Orléans plays its home matches at the Stade de la Source located within the city.

== History ==
The club was originally called Arago Sport Orléanais and founded as the football section of a general sports club in the city. In 1976, the club adopted its current name and turned professional in 1980. The club is based at the modern 5,000 capacity all-seated Stade de la Source. The club's record attendance was 11,680 against AS Monaco in 1989 and its colours are red and yellow.

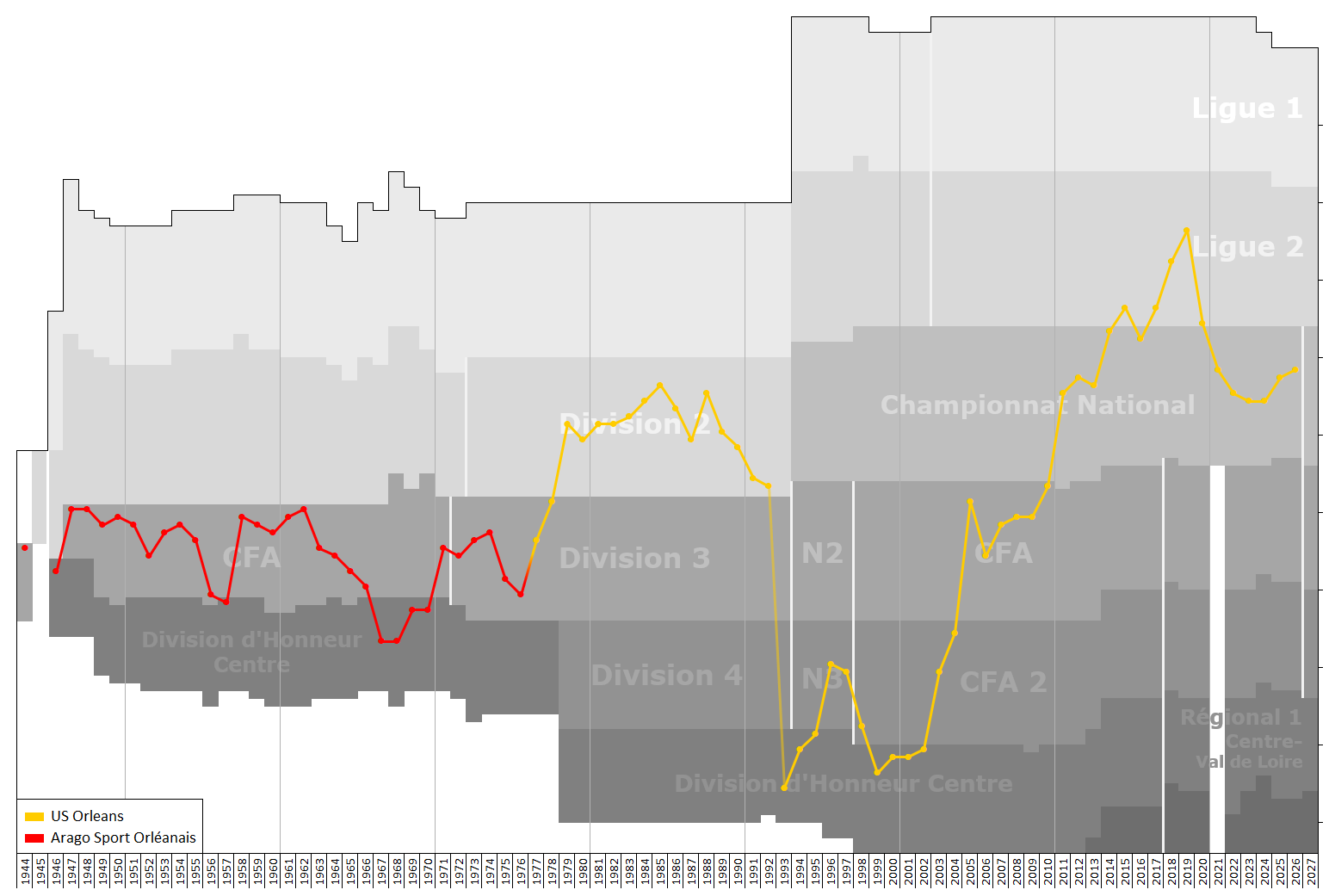
Historical league performance chart of US Orléans

=== Recent history ===
In the 2013–14 Championnat National season Orléans finished as champions, returning to the second tier for the first time since 1991–92 season.

In the 2014–15 season, they were relegated back to the Championnat National, only to be promoted back to the Ligue 2 the following season. The 2016–17 season saw Orléans finish 18th, whilst they finished 12th in the 2017–18 season. They finished 8th in the 2018–19 season.

== Honours ==
- Championnat National
  - Winners (1): 2013–14
- Championnat de France amateur
  - Winners (1): 2009–10 (Group D)
- Coupe de France
  - Runners-up (1): 1980

== Players ==
=== Current squad ===
As of 5 September 2026.

Note: Flags indicate national team as defined under FIFA eligibility rules; some limited exceptions apply. Players may hold more than one non-FIFA nationality.

No.	Pos.	Nation	Player
1	GK	GUF	Fei-Hong Faham
4	DF	FRA	Enzo Balenga
5	DF	FRA	Mamadou Sylla
6	MF	FRA	Hugo Aubourg
7	MF	FRA	Mamadou Diako
8	MF	FRA	Abou Ba
9	FW	HAI	Mondy Prunier
10	MF	LIE	Guillaume Khous
11	MF	FRA	Grégory Berthier
12	DF	FRA	Mathéo Guiheneuf
14	MF	FRA	Youness Aouladzian

No.	Pos.	Nation	Player
17	DF	FRA	Boubacar Diakhaby
19	FW	FRA	Robin Legendre
20	MF	FRA	Belkacem Dali-Amar
21	MF	FRA	Lilian Raillot
23	DF	FRA	Jad Koembo
24	DF	FRA	Ismaël Dramé
25	FW	SEN	Idrissa Seydi
26	FW	FRA	Adam Ribeiro
27	DF	FRA	Marius Lemaître
29	DF	GAB	Johann Obiang
40	GK	CMR	Stéphan Moussima

=== Notable players ===
Below are the notable former players who have represented Orléans in league and international competition since the club's foundation in 1976. To appear in the section below, a player must have played in at least 80 official matches for the club or have represented their respective national team during their stint at the club or after the player's departure.

- (Chad) Marius Mbaiam
- (France) Bruno Germain
- (France) Jacky Lemée
- (France) Gaëtan Perrin
- (France) Florian Thauvin (youth)
- (France) Cyril Théréau
- (France) Jules Vandooren
- (Luxembourg) Robby Langers
- (Romania) Laszlo Bölöni
- (Serbia) Milan Ćalasan
- (Ivory Coast) Nicolas Pépé

== Managers ==
- (France) Jacques Lemée (1977–88)
- (France) Jean-Pierre Destrumelle (1989–91)
- (France) Henri Atamaniuk (1991–92)
- (France) Jacques Lemée (1994–97)
- (France) Bruno Steck (2004–06)
- (France) Yann Lachuer (2009–12)
- (France) Olivier Frapolli (2012–16)
- (France) Didier Olle-Nicolle (2016–20)
- (France) Cyril Carrière (2020)
- (France) Gilbert Zoonekynd (2020)
- (France) Claude Robin (2020–21)
- (France) Xavier Collin (2021–22)
- (France) Nicolas Usaï (2022–23)
- (France) Bernard Casoni (2023–)
