= Didier Ollé-Nicolle =

French footballer and manager (born 1961)

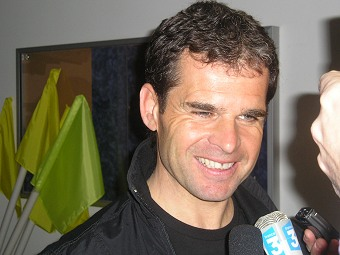

Personal information
- Date of birth: 2 September 1961 (age 65)
- Place of birth: Belley, France
- Position: Defender

Youth career
- 1968–1977: Auray
- 1977–1979: Angers

Senior career*
Years	Team	Apps	(Gls)
1979–1984	Angers		
1984–1990	Chambéry		
1990–1991	Raon-l'Étape		

Managerial career
- 1990–1999: Raon-l'Étape
- 2000–2003: Valenciennes
- 2003–2005: Nîmes
- 2005–2006: Châteauroux
- 2006–2009: Clermont
- 2009–2010: Nice
- 2010–2011: Neuchâtel Xamax
- 2011: Apollon Limassol
- 2011–2012: USM Alger
- 2012–2013: Rouen
- 2014: Benin
- 2015–2016: Colmar
- 2016–2020: Orléans
- 2020–2021: Le Mans
- 2021–2022: Paris Saint-Germain
- * Club domestic league appearances and goals

Didier Ollé-Nicolle (born 2 September 1961) is a French football manager and former player who played as a defender. He most recently managed Division 1 Féminine side Paris Saint-Germain Féminine.

== Club career ==
Ollé-Nicolle was born in Belley, Ain. He had a modest playing career in French lower leagues for Angers, Chambéry and Raon-l'Étape. He primarily played as a defender.

== Managerial career ==
Ollé-Nicolle coached Raon-l'Étape, Valenciennes, Nîmes, Châteauroux. He has managing in Ligue 1 at OGC Nice, as of 1 July 2009 and on 9 March 2010, Nice decided to sack him and put the team into the hands of Eric Roy, René Marsiglia and Frédéric Gioria.

In September 2010, he was named Neuchâtel Xamax manager. He was sacked after a 4–1 home defeat against FC Thun on 11 May 2011, leaving the Swiss Cup finalist two points clear of relegation with three games left.

In July 2011, he was hired as manager for Apollon Limassol, a Cypriot team considered to be one of the strong teams on the island of Cyprus, with lot of supporters but with many economic and staffing issues surrounding the team in 2011. Didier Nicolle appeared to be the most appropriate manager after short-listing some others, to help the team regain its prestige and return to the path of titles and glory.

On 10 November 2011, Ollé-Nicolle was appointed as manager of Algerian Ligue Professionnelle 1 side USM Alger, signing a two-year contract with the club.

On 24 May 2012, it was confirmed Ollé-Nicolle would take charge as the coach of Championnat National side FC Rouen for the 2012–13 season.

In March 2014, Ollé-Nicolle was named the head coach of the Benin national team on a two-year contract. He departed the role in November 2014.

In March 2015, he was named as head coach of SR Colmar in the third tier of French football.

In 2016, he became the new manager of US Orléans. In February 2020, with the club at the bottom of the Ligue 2 table, he was sacked.

On 1 June 2020 he was announced as the new head coach of Le Mans FC. After finishing 4th in the 2020–21 Championnat National, it was announced that he was leaving his position.

On 27 September 2023, a criminal investigation was opened against Ollé-Nicolle, with Kadidiatou Diani accusing him of sexual assault.
