= Louis Poggi (footballer) =

French footballer (born 1984)

Personal information
- Date of birth: 18 June 1984 (age 42)
- Place of birth: Bastia, France
- Height: 1.73 m (5 ft 8 in)
- Position: Midfielder

Senior career*
Years	Team	Apps	(Gls)
2001–2005	Gazélec Ajaccio	93	(5)
2005–2007	Toulon	62	(0)
2008–2017	Gazélec Ajaccio	246	(22)
2017–2018	Bastia-Borgo	27	(4)
2018–2019	Bastia	22	(4)
2019–2021	AJ Biguglia		
2021–2022	AS Santa-Reparata		
2022–2024	Gazélec Ajaccio	7+ (Note: Statistics are unknown for the 2023–24 season.)	(0+)
Total		457+	(35+)

International career
2012	Corsica	1	(0)
- * Club domestic league appearances and goals

Louis Poggi (born 18 June 1984) is a French former professional footballer who played as a midfielder.
