= Lactel =

French brand of organic milk products

- Industry: Milk Products

Lactel is a brand of French company Lactalis specializing in organic milk products.

In August 2017, Lactel celebrated its 50th anniversary by launching a collector's edition signed by Mary Gribouille on its Lactel Vitamin D range. In November 2017, Lactel launched semi-skimmed milk "the call of the meadows".

In 2018, Lactalis acquired the Nestlé dairy business in Malaysia in a $40 million deal with the entire Nestlé chilled dairy products in the country being rebranded to Lactel by the following year.

In 2020, Lactel 1 litre UHT toned milk was officially launched in India following its entry to the country dairy market since early 2014.

== Gallery ==
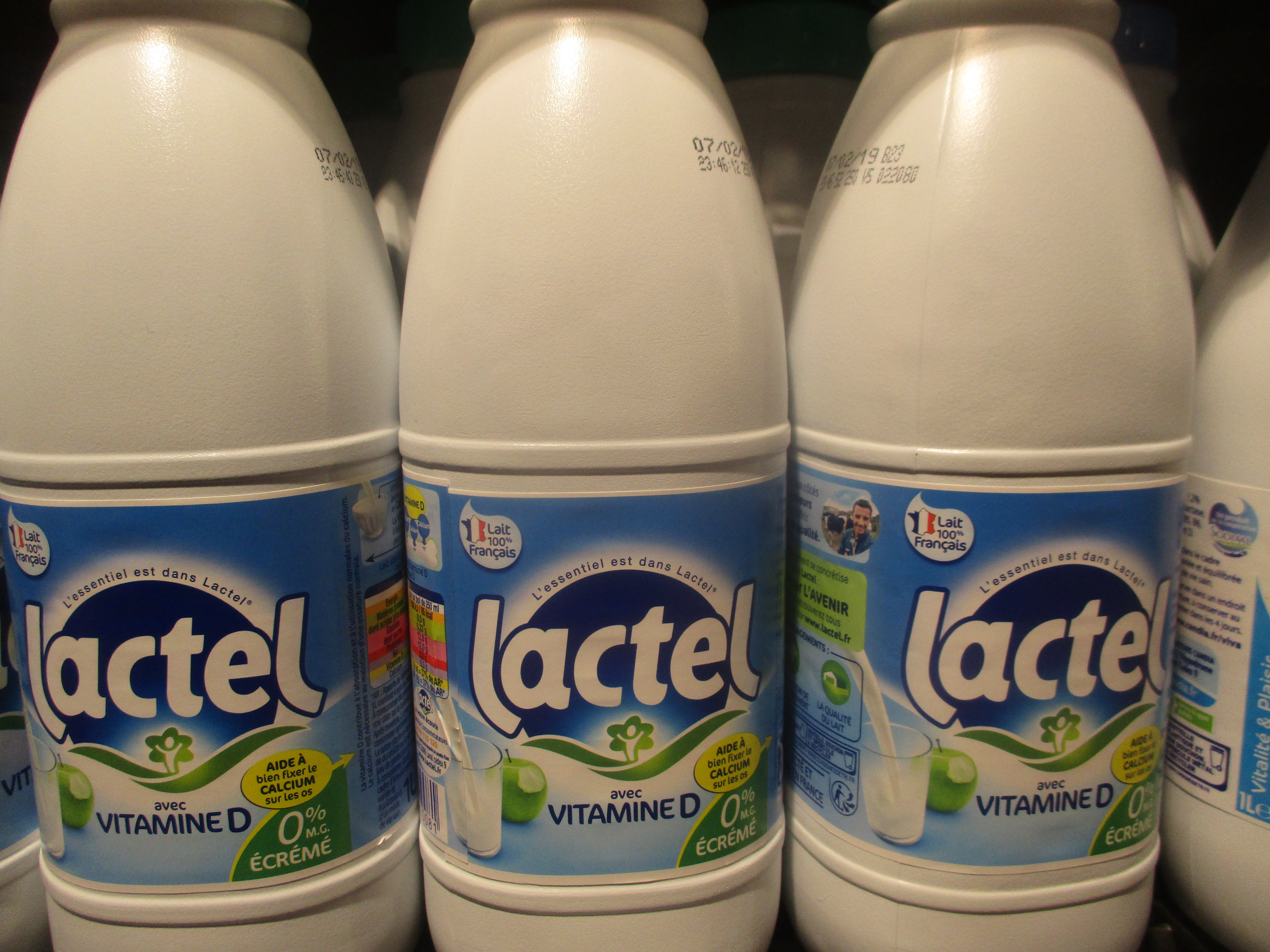
Lactel Milk bottles
