= Albert Cartier =

French footballer (born 1960)

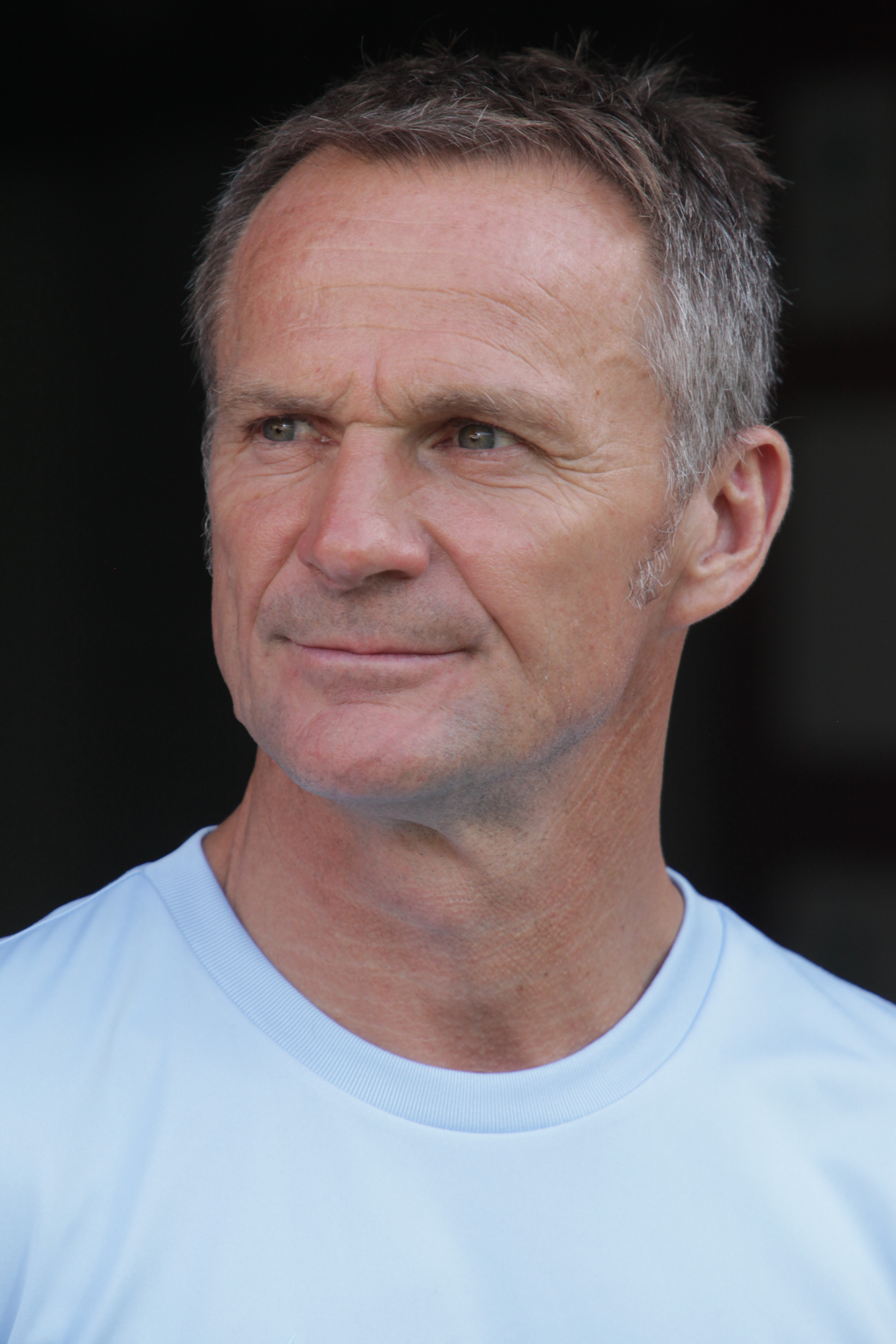
- Cartier in 2013

Personal information
- Full name: Albert Pierre Maurice Marie Cartier
- Date of birth: 22 November 1960 (age 65)
- Place of birth: Vesoul, France
- Height: 1.82 m (6 ft 0 in)
- Position: Defender

Senior career*
Years	Team	Apps	(Gls)
1980–1987	Nancy	176	(2)
1987–1995	Metz	227	(7)
Total		403	(9)

Managerial career
- 1995–2000: Metz (assistant coach)
- 2000–2002: Metz
- 2002–2004: Gueugnon
- 2004–2005: La Louvière
- 2005–2008: Brussels
- 2008: Mons
- 2008–2009: Tubize
- 2009: Panthrakikos
- 2010–2011: Eupen
- 2012–2015: Metz
- 2015–2017: Sochaux
- 2017–2018: Gazélec Ajaccio
- 2021: Bastia-Borgo
- 2022–2023: Nancy
- * Club domestic league appearances and goals

Albert Pierre Maurice Marie Cartier (born 22 November 1960) is a French professional football manager and former player.

== Coaching career ==
Cartier was fired by FC Brussels in January 2008 for bad results and did not reach a new agreement with RAEC Mons.

On 12 January 2010, the French coach left Panthrakikos.

In September 2010, Cartier became the new coach of K.A.S. Eupen, a team from the Belgian league

In June 2012, he signed a two-year contract with his former team FC Metz, which was relegated for the first time in its history to Championnat National, the third level of French football. The 2012–13 season proved to be a success, as the team was promoted to Ligue 2. For 2013–14 season, the initial goal was to secure a mid-table position. The results far exceeded the expectations. Metz took the lead on Day 9, and never gave it up, ending Ligue 2 champion with a wide margin of 11 points to the second, and being therefore promoted to Ligue 1. His peers elected him best Ligue 2 coach for the season. On 20 May 2014, he signed for two more years with Metz.

Cartier was announced as presumptive manager of Tunisian team Étoile Sportive du Sahel in October 2019, but the management committee changed direction at the last minute.

In March 2021, Cartier was announced as the head coach of FC Bastia-Borgo in the French Championnat National. He was fired by Bastia-Borgo on 4 November 2021 due to poor results, with five draws and seven losses in the first 12 games of the 2021–22 season.
