= Cédric Daury =

French footballer and manager (1969–2024)

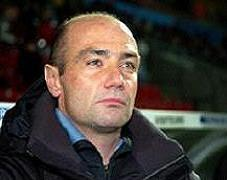
- Daury as Châteauroux manager in 2007

Personal information
- Date of birth: 19 October 1969
- Place of birth: Meudon, France
- Date of death: 12 August 2024 (aged 54)
- Place of death: Tours, France
- Height: 1.80 m (5 ft 11 in)
- Positions: Midfielder; striker

Youth career
- 1978–1982: Courcouronnes
- 1982–1986: Viry-Châtillon
- 1986–1988: Reims

Senior career*
Years	Team	Apps	(Gls)
1988–1990	Reims	10	(0)
1990–1994	Angers	134	(37)
1994–1996	Le Havre	68	(12)
1996–1997	Cannes	31	(3)
1997–1998	Laval	18	(0)
1998–2001	Châteauroux	68	(4)
Total		329	(56)

International career
1991	France U21	2	(0)

Managerial career
- 2003–2006: Châteauroux (reserves)
- 2006–2008: Châteauroux
- 2009–2012: Le Havre
- 2015–2016: Châteauroux
- 2016–2017: Auxerre
- 2019: Auxerre (interim)
- * Club domestic league appearances and goals

Cédric Daury (French pronunciation: [sedʁik doʁi]; 19 October 1969 – 12 August 2024) was a French football manager and player. He was the sporting director of Auxerre.

== Club career ==
Daury played as a midfielder and striker, for Ligue 1 and Ligue 2 clubs Reims, Angers, Le Havre, Cannes, Laval and Châteauroux.

== International career ==
Daury represented France at under-21 level.

== Managerial career ==
Daury began his coaching career with Châteauroux's youth teams, before managing the first team from 2006 to 2008. In June 2009, he became Le Havre's manager, replacing Frédéric Hantz, Daury signed a two-year deal.

== Death ==
Daury died in Tours on 12 August 2024, at the age of 54.
