= Sébastien Roudet =

French footballer (born 1981)

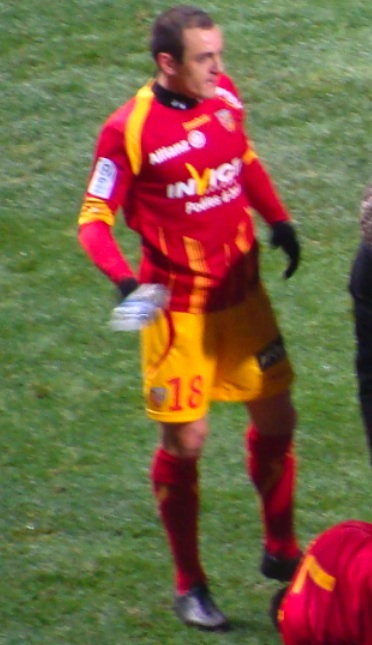
- Roudet with Lens

Personal information
- Date of birth: 16 June 1981 (age 45)
- Place of birth: Montluçon, France
- Height: 1.74 m (5 ft 9 in)
- Position: Midfielder

Youth career
- Châteauroux

Senior career*
Years	Team	Apps	(Gls)
1998–2004	Châteauroux	158	(27)
2004–2006	Nice	53	(5)
2006–2008	Valenciennes	60	(8)
2008–2011	Lens	80	(9)
2011–2014	Sochaux	81	(5)
2014–2015	Châteauroux	25	(2)
2015–2019	Valenciennes	95	(15)
Total		552	(71)
- * Club domestic league appearances and goals

Sébastien Roudet (born 16 June 1981) is a French former professional football midfielder.
