= Stade de la Source =

Football stadium in Orléans, France

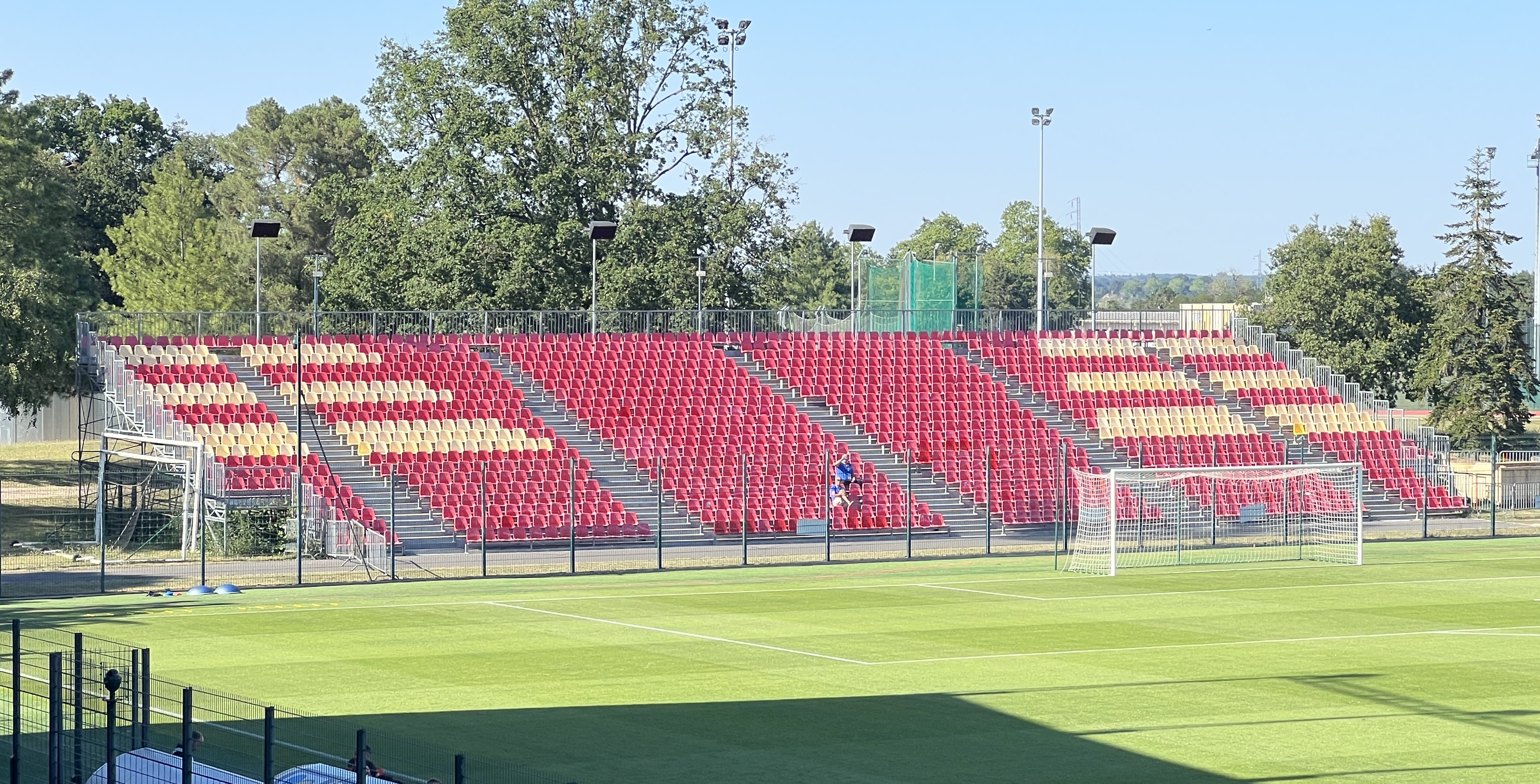
- Interactive map of Stade de la Source
- Location: Orléans, France
- Coordinates: 47°50′25″N 1°56′28″E
- Owner: City of Orléans
- Operator: US Orléans
- Capacity: 7,533
- Surface: grass

Construction
- Opened: 1976
- Renovated: 2011, 2014, 2015

Tenant
- US Orléans (1976–present)

Stade de la Source (pronounced [stad də la suʁs]) is a football stadium in Orléans, France. It is the current home of US Orléans. The stadium is able to hold 7,533 people and was opened in 1976.
