= Bruno Grougi =

Martiniquais footballer (born 1983)

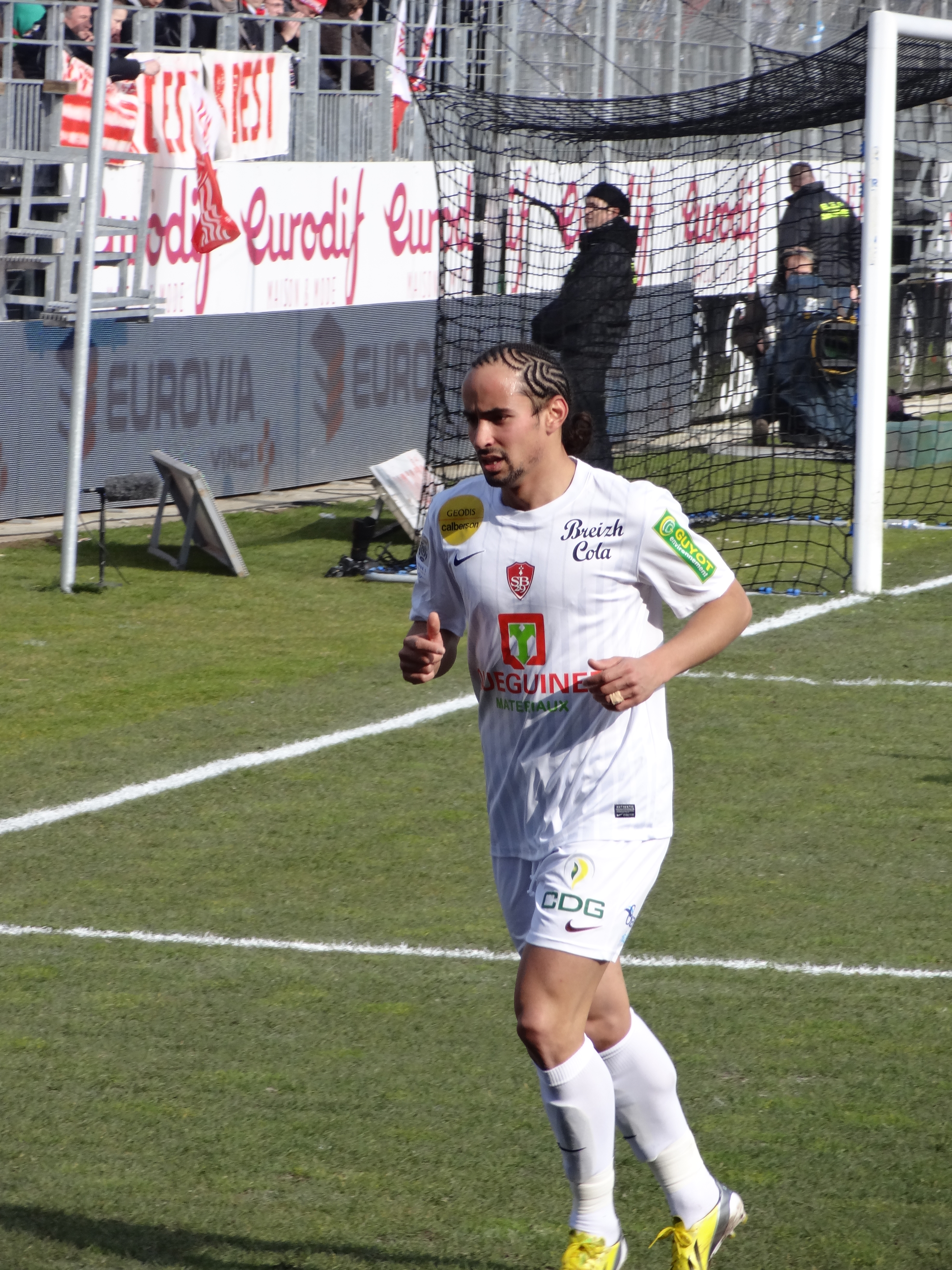
- Grougi with Brest in 2013

Personal information
- Date of birth: 26 April 1983 (age 43)
- Place of birth: Caen, France
- Height: 1.73 m (5 ft 8 in)
- Position: Midfielder

Team information
- Current team: Brest (assistant manager)

Senior career*
Years	Team	Apps	(Gls)
2001–2006	Caen	40	(0)
2004–2005	→ Cherbourg (loan)	33	(5)
2006–2009	Clermont	101	(19)
2009–2018	Brest	277	(50)
Total		451	(74)

International career
2000–2001	France U18	11	(3)
2001–2002	France U19	13	(2)
2016–2018	Martinique	3	(1)

Managerial career
- 2022–2023: Brest (caretaker)
- * Club domestic league appearances and goals

Bruno Grougi (born 26 April 1983) is a French former professional footballer who played as a midfielder. After playing for France youth teams, he made three appearances for the Martinique national team.

== Career statistics ==
Scores and results list Martinique's goal tally first, score column indicates score after each Grougi goal.

List of international goals scored by Bruno Grougi
No.	Date	Venue	Cap	Opponent	Score	Result	Competition
1	7 June 2016	Windsor Park, Roseau, Dominica	2	Dominica	3–0	4–0	2017 Caribbean Cup qualification
