= Gilbert Zoonekynd =

French footballer and coach

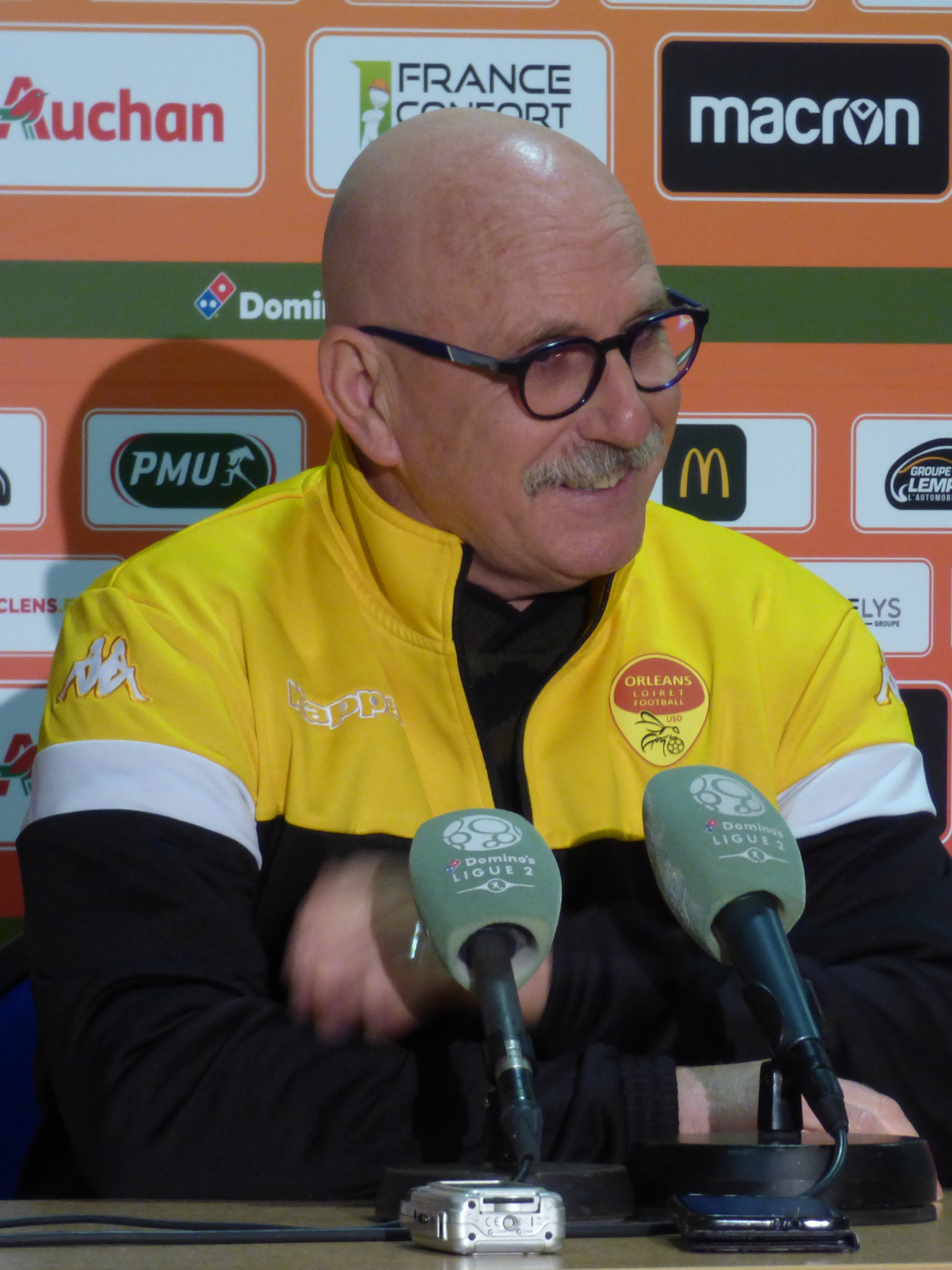
- Zoonekynd in March 2020

Personal information
- Full name: Gilbert Zoonekynd
- Date of birth: October 4, 1956 (age 70)
- Place of birth: Fort-Mardyck, Nord, France
- Height: 1.71 m (5 ft 7 in)
- Position: Midfielder

Team information
- Current team: US Orléans (academy director)

Senior career*
Years	Team	Apps	(Gls)
1973–1981	US Dunkerque		
1981–1983	Limoges FC		
1983–1984	FC Gueugnon		
1984–1986	FC Montceau Bourgogne		
1986–1988	US Boulogne		

Managerial career
- 1986–1988: US Boulogne
- 1990–1992: FC Flers
- 1992–1993: CA Propriano
- 1996–1997: SAS Épinal
- 2014–2015: Tours FC
- 2017: Tours FC
- 2020: US Orléans
- * Club domestic league appearances and goals

Gilbert Zoonekynd (born 4 October 1956) is a French former professional footballer and coach. A midfielder during the 1970s and 1980s, he made more than 200 appearances for US Dunkerque before continuing his career with Limoges FC, FC Gueugnon and FC Montceau Bourgogne. After retiring as a player, he became a coach.

== Career ==
Zoonekynd began his professional career with US Dunkerque. He then joined Limoges FC in 1981, followed by a season with FC Gueugnon in 1983–1984 and two seasons with FC Montceau Bourgogne. He finished his playing career at US Boulogne, where he also began coaching.

== Coaching career ==
While still a player at US Boulogne, Zoonekynd served as player‑coach from 1986 to 1988. He then went on to manage FC Flers (1990–1992) and CA Propriano (1992–1993). In the 1996-97 season he become Épinal’s head coach.

In 2014, he became assistant coach at Tours FC and later served as co‑manager during the 2014–15 season. After Tours avoided relegation, he was replaced at the end of the campaign.

Zoonekynd returned as manager of Tours FC in March 2017, successfully keeping the club in Ligue 2 before being dismissed in October 2017.
