= Thierry Goudet =

French football manager (born 1962)

Personal information
- Date of birth: 11 November 1962 (age 63)
- Place of birth: Château-Gontier, France
- Height: 1.66 m (5 ft 5 in)
- Position: Midfielder

Youth career
- Ernée
- 1978–1980: Laval

Senior career*
Years	Team	Apps	(Gls)
1980–1986	Laval	189	(24)
1986–1988	Brest	76	(3)
1988–1991	Rennes	84	(3)
1991–1993	Le Havre	56	(1)
1993–1994	Laval	22	(1)
Total		427	(32)

Managerial career
- 1994–1997: Bonchamps-lès-Laval
- 1997–2000: Thouars
- 2000–2004: Le Mans
- 2004–2006: Grenoble
- 2006: Brest
- 2007–2008: Créteil
- 2010–2011: Changé
- 2014–2015: Le Havre
- 2016: AFC Tubize
- 2017: Laval
- * Club domestic league appearances and goals

Thierry Goudet (born 11 November 1962) is a football coach and former player who played as a midfielder and most recently managed Laval.
