= 2012–13 Championnat National =

Championnat National
- Season: 2012–13
- Promoted: Créteil; Metz; CA Bastia
- Relegated: Rouen; Épinal; Cherbourg; Quevilly
- Matches: 380
- Goals: 907 (2.39 per match)
- Top goalscorer: Romain Pastorelli (26 goals)
- Biggest home win: Boulogne-sur-Mer 5–0 Red Star (19 October 2012)
- Biggest away win: Quevilly 0–5 Vannes (2 February 2013)
- Highest scoring: Quevilly 3–6 Metz (31 August 2012)
- Longest winning run: 8 games Créteil (14 September – 9 November)
- Longest unbeaten run: 11 games Fréjus (15 March – 11 May)
- Longest winless run: 25 games Quevilly (3 August – 9 March)
- Longest losing run: 8 games Bourg-Péronnas (29 March – 11 May)

The 2012–13 Championnat National season was the 15th season since its establishment. The previous season's champions were Nîmes. The league schedule was announced in May 2012 and the fixtures were determined on 7 July. The season began on 3 August and ended on 24 May 2013. The winter break took place from 23 December to 12 January 2013.

== Teams ==
There were four promoted teams from the Championnat de France amateur, replacing the four teams that were relegated from the Championnat National following the 2011–12 season. There were also three teams relegated from Ligue 2, the second division in France, replacing the clubs that were promoted to Ligue 2 from National for the 2012–13 season. A total of 20 teams competed in the league. Due to a 2010 federation ruling, beginning with the 2013–14 season, the Championnat National will downsize to 18 teams. Therefore, six clubs will suffer relegation to the fourth division, Championnat de France amateur in the 2012–13 season. All clubs that secured National status for the season were subject to approval by the DNCG before becoming eligible to participate.

Amiens was the first club to suffer relegation to the Championnat National in the 2011–12 Ligue 2 season. The club's drop was confirmed on 27 April 2012 following the team's 5–0 loss to Nantes. Amiens returned to the third division after only one season in Ligue 2. Two weeks later, Boulogne relegation to National was confirmed following the club's 2–1 defeat to Angers. Boulogne returned to the amateur level after five seasons playing at the professional level; included in those five years was a year's stint in Ligue 1. On the final day of the 2011–12 Ligue 2 season, Metz became the final club to fall to the third division following a 1–1 draw with Tours. Metz played in the Championnat National for the first time in club history having never appeared below Ligue 2 since the inception of professionalism in 1932.

On 18 May 2012, Uzès Pont du Gard became the first club from the Championnat de France amateur to earn promotion to the third division following a 1–0 win over Béziers. The club appeared in the Championnat National for the first time in its history. On the final day of the Championnat de France amateur season, CA Bastia, Bourg-Péronnas, and Carquefou all earned promotion to National after achieving positive results that made it impossible for the second-placed club in their respective groups to surpass them. Like Uzès, CA Bastia made its debut in the third division, while Carquefou and Bourg-Péronnas returned to the league after extended stays below the third division.

=== DNCG rulings ===
On 12 June 2012, following a preliminary review of each club's administrative and financial accounts in the Championnat National, the DNCG ruled that Cherbourg would be relegated to the Championnat de France amateur due to the club possessing a financial debt of €200,000. Following the announcement, Cherbourg president Gérard Gohel announced that the club would appeal the decision. On 5 July, the DNCG reversed its decision to relegate Cherbourg after the club gained the €200,000 required to remain in the division.

=== Stadia and locations ===
Location of teams in 2012–13 Championnat National

Club	Location	Venue	Capacity	Average attendance^{1}
Amiens	Amiens	Stade de la Licorne	12,097	5644
Boulogne	Boulogne-sur-Mer	Stade de la Libération	15,004	3541
Bourg-Péronnas	Péronnas	Stade Municipal de Péronnas	3,500	1472
CA Bastia	Bastia	Stade Erbajolo	2,000	569
Carquefou	Carquefou	Stade du Moulin Boisseau	2,500	1258
Cherbourg	Cherbourg-Octeville	Stade Maurice Postaire	7,000	802
Colmar	Colmar	Colmar Stadium	7,000	1916
Créteil	Créteil	Stade Dominique Duvauchelle	12,150	945
Épinal	Épinal	Stade de la Colombière	8,000	859
Fréjus	Fréjus	Stade Pourcin	2,500	1368
Le Poiré-sur-Vie	Le Poiré-sur-Vie	Stade de l'Idonnière	1,950	2405
Luzenac	Luzenac	Stade Paul Fédou	1,000	718
Metz	Metz	Stade Saint-Symphorien	26,700	8665
Orléans	Orléans	Stade de la Source	6,000	1565
Paris	Paris	Stade Sébastien Charléty	20,000	294
Quevilly	Le Petit-Quevilly	Stade Lozai	2,500	733
Red Star	Saint-Ouen	Stade Bauer	10,000	1147
Rouen	Rouen	Stade Robert Diochon	10,000	2727
Uzès Pont du Gard	Uzès	Stade Pautex	2,500	658
Vannes	Vannes	Stade de la Rabine	8,000	2426

^{1}Source:

=== Personnel and kits ===
Note: Flags indicate national team as has been defined under FIFA eligibility rules. Players and managers may hold more than one non-FIFA nationality.

Team	Manager^{1}	Captain^{1}	Kit Manufacturer^{1}	Main Sponsor^{1}
Amiens	Francis De Taddeo	Thomas Mienniel	Kappa	Amiens Métropole
Boulogne	Georges Tournay	Guillaume Loriot	Uhlsport	Boostyle
Bourg-Péronnas	Hervé Della Maggiore	Yannick Goyon	Lotto	Relais Pneus
CA Bastia	Stéphane Rossi	Rémy Arnoux	Erreà	Corsicatour
Carquefou	Denis Renaud	Sébastien Le Paih	Duarig	Jacques Métay
Cherbourg	Jean-Marie Huriez	Loïc Binet	Nike	Maîtres Laitiers du Cotentin
Colmar	Damien Ott	Sylvain Meslien	Nike	Patrick Sports
Créteil	Jean-Luc Vasseur	Sebastien Gondouin	Nike	SFB Béton
Épinal	Fabien Tossot	Abdellah Asbabou	Nike	Fromages Ermitage
Fréjus	Michel Estevan	Vincent Fernandez	Lotto	Géant
Le Poiré-sur-Vie	Oswald Tanchot	Ludovic Pallier	Nike	Yves Cougnaud
Luzenac	Christophe Pélissier	Sébastien Mignotte	Erreà	Groupe Scopelec
Metz	Albert Cartier	Gregory Proment	Nike	Moselle
Orléans	Yann Lachuer	Yozip Lemée	Umbro	CTVL
Paris	Alexandre Monier	Ibrahima Fayé	Nike	Nexity
Quevilly	Laurent Hatton	Frédéric Weis	Nike	Matmut
Red Star	Vincent Doukantié	Bertrand Abissonono	Adidas	
Rouen	Didier Ollé-Nicolle	Pierre Vignaud	Hummel	Promaritime International
Uzès Pont du Gard	Samuel Cruz	Florian Fabre	Duarig	Carrefour
Vannes	Stéphane Le Mignan	Patrick Leugueun	Adidas	Breizh Cola

^{1} Subject to change prior to the start of the season.

=== Managerial changes ===
Team	Outgoing head coach	Manner of departure	Date of vacancy	Position in table	Incoming head coach	Date of appointment	Position in table
Rouen	Emmanuel Da Costa	Mutual consent	18 May 2012	Off-season	Didier Ollé-Nicolle	30 May 2012	Off-season
Quevilly	Régis Brouard	Joined Clermont	30 May 2012	Off-season	Laurent Hatton	6 June 2012	Off-season
Paris	Alain MBoma	Resigned	18 May 2012	Off-season	Olivier Guillou	22 June 2012	Off-season
Boulogne	Pascal Plancque	Mutual consent	7 June 2012	Off-season	Georges Tournay	23 June 2012	Off-season
Fréjus Saint-Raphaël	Charly Paquille	Mutual consent	18 May 2012	Off-season	Michel Estevan	1 July 2012	Off-season
Amiens	Ludovic Batelli	Resigned	30 June 2012	Off-season	Francis De Taddeo	1 July 2012	Off-season
Paris	Olivier Guillou	Fired	5 October 2012	18th	Alexandre Monier	5 October 2012	18th

== League table ==
Pos	Team	Pld	W	D	L	GF	GA	GD	Pts	Promotion or Relegation
1	Créteil (C, P)	38	23	7	8	68	44	+24	76	Promotion to Ligue 2
2	Metz (P)	38	20	10	8	62	37	+25	70	Promotion to Ligue 2
3	CA Bastia (P)	38	18	7	13	56	51	+5	61	Promotion to Ligue 2
4	Fréjus	38	16	12	10	52	43	+9	60	
5	Rouen (R, R)	38	18	8	12	50	37	+13	59	Relegation to Division d'Honneur (Note: Rouen was administratively relegated by DNCG due to serious financial trouble of their management company.)
6	Le Poiré-sur-Vie	38	15	12	11	47	35	+12	57	
7	Carquefou	38	15	12	11	53	35	+18	57	
8	Orléans	38	16	9	13	43	40	+3	57	
9	Amiens	38	14	12	12	48	38	+10	54	
10	Vannes	38	12	15	11	45	34	+11	51	
11	Colmar	38	13	11	14	43	45	−2	50	
12	Luzenac	38	12	12	14	43	47	−4	48	
13	Boulogne	38	11	14	13	46	44	+2	47	
14	Red Star	38	11	13	14	34	45	−11	46	
15	Bourg-Péronnas	38	12	9	17	28	40	−12	45	
16	Uzès Pont du Gard	38	10	13	15	31	47	−16	43	
17	Paris	38	8	16	14	38	56	−18	40	
18	Épinal (R)	38	8	15	15	45	56	−11	39	Relegation to Championnat de France amateur
19	Cherbourg (R)	38	9	12	17	41	59	−18	39	Relegation to Championnat de France amateur
20	Quevilly (R)	38	4	11	23	34	74	−40	23	Relegation to Championnat de France amateur

Source: French Football Federation
Rules for classification: 1) points; 2) goal difference; 3) number of goals scored.
(C) Champions; (P) Promoted; (R) Relegated

== Results ==
Home \ Away	AMI	BOU	BPE	CAB	CQF	CHB	COL	CRE	EPI	FRE	LPV	LUZ	MET	ORL	PAR	QUE	RSFC	ROU	UZE	VAN
Amiens		0–2	0–0	3–0	1–1	1–1	1–1	1–4	3–1	0–1	3–0	0–1	1–1	3–0	3–2	1–2	1–0	1–0	1–2	0–1
Boulogne	1–1		1–0	4–1	2–1	2–0	0–0	1–2	2–2	0–1	0–0	1–0	1–0	1–2	0–0	2–2	5–0	1–1	2–2	0–3
Bourg-Péronnas	0–2	0–0		1–1	1–2	2–1	1–0	1–1	2–1	0–1	0–2	1–0	1–2	1–0	1–1	0–1	0–0	0–2	2–3	0–0
CA Bastia	1–0	1–0	4–0		2–1	3–0	1–2	2–1	2–1	2–2	2–1	3–1	2–1	3–2	1–2	1–1	5–1	5–3	1–0	2–1
Carquefou	1–1	3–0	0–1	5–0		2–0	3–2	4–0	1–0	2–1	1–1	0–2	4–1	2–2	0–0	4–0	2–2	0–0	2–1	0–0
Cherbourg	0–3	0–3	0–3	1–1	0–1		1–1	0–0	2–2	2–2	1–0	2–3	1–2	1–1	0–1	1–0	1–0	4–3	3–1	2–1
Colmar	1–4	0–1	1–2	0–1	1–0	1–0		1–2	1–2	0–1	1–0	1–1	0–0	0–0	2–0	2–1	0–0	3–2	1–1	3–2
Créteil	1–1	2–1	3–1	2–0	2–1	2–0	0–3		0–2	3–0	4–1	2–1	2–0	1–2	1–1	3–0	2–2	1–0	4–1	2–1
Épinal	2–2	1–1	3–2	2–0	0–2	1–1	1–3	1–2		0–2	3–3	0–0	1–0	0–0	2–2	2–2	2–1	1–1	0–1	1–1
Fréjus	2–0	1–2	0–1	3–1	1–1	2–2	3–1	1–0	2–2		1–0	3–1	1–1	0–0	1–1	1–0	4–0	1–1	0–1	2–1
Le Poiré-sur-Vie	0–1	2–1	0–0	0–0	3–1	3–0	1–2	1–2	2–0	0–0		1–1	1–1	2–0	2–0	3–1	4–1	4–1	0–0	1–2
Luzenac	0–1	1–0	2–0	1–1	0–0	3–3	1–1	0–0	0–2	4–2	0–1		2–2	2–1	4–0	1–0	0–0	3–1	2–0	1–4
Metz	3–1	2–1	2–0	1–1	2–0	1–3	1–1	3–1	2–0	3–0	2–0	1–0		2–4	3–0	2–0	1–1	1–0	3–0	1–1
Orléans	0–2	2–0	0–1	1–0	1–2	2–1	2–1	2–5	2–1	4–1	0–0	1–0	0–2		1–2	4–1	2–1	1–0	2–0	0–1
Paris	2–3	1–1	2–1	0–1	0–0	0–4	2–1	0–3	2–2	1–2	1–1	2–2	0–2	1–0		5–1	0–0	1–0	1–2	2–2
Quevilly	0–0	2–2	0–1	1–3	1–0	0–0	1–2	2–3	1–1	1–4	1–2	1–2	3–6	0–1	2–2		1–1	1–1	1–0	0–5
Red Star	1–0	2–2	0–1	1–0	2–1	3–0	3–0	0–1	2–0	2–1	0–1	1–0	0–2	0–0	2–0	2–1		1–0	1–1	0–0
Rouen	1–0	3–1	1–0	3–2	2–1	1–0	1–2	3–0	2–1	1–0	1–1	4–0	1–0	0–0	0–0	1–0	2–0		3–0	1–0
Uzès Pont du Gard	1–1	1–1	1–0	1–0	0–2	1–1	1–0	1–2	0–2	1–1	0–2	1–1	1–1	0–0	2–0	1–1	2–1	0–1		0–0
Vannes	1–1	2–1	0–0	1–0	0–0	1–2	1–1	2–2	2–0	1–1	0–1	3–0	1–2	0–1	1–1	2–1	0–0	0–2	1–0	

Source: French Football Federation
Legend: Blue = home team win; Yellow = draw; Red = away team win.

== Season statistics ==
=== Top goalscorers ===
Rank	Player	Club	Goals
1	Romain Pastorelli	CA Bastia	26
2	Diafra Sakho	Metz	19
2	Emiliano Sala	Orléans	19
4	Christian Bekamenga	Carquefou	17
4	Kévin Lefaix	Le Poiré-sur-Vie	17
6	Oussoumane Fofana	Quevilly	15
6	Mathieu Scarpelli	Fréjus	15
8	Faneva Imà Andriatsima	Créteil	14
8	Florian Martin	Carquefou	14
10	Samir Benmeziane	Uzès Pont du Gard	13

Source: Official Goalscorers' Standings
