= 2012–13 in French football =

Football in France
- Season: 2012–13

Men's football
- Ligue 1: Paris Saint-Germain
- Ligue 2: Monaco
- Championnat National: Créteil
- Coupe de France: Bordeaux
- Coupe de la Ligue: Saint-Étienne
- Trophée des Champions: Lyon

Women's football
- Division 1: Lyon
- Coupe de France: Lyon

The 2012–13 season was the 108th overall season of football and the 80th season of competitive professional football in France.

The France men's national team began play on 15 August 2012, contesting a friendly match against Uruguay. The team also began contesting qualification matches for the 2014 FIFA World Cup. The men's youth international teams also began playing qualification matches for their yearly European Championship tournament. Les Espoirs concluded its qualification campaign for the 2013 UEFA European Under-21 Football Championship, while the under-19 and under-17 teams played qualification matches for the 2013 UEFA European Under-19 Football Championship and 2013 UEFA European Under-17 Football Championship, respectively.

Similarly, the women's team concluded its qualification campaign for UEFA Women's Euro 2013.

== Broadcast rights ==
On 23 June 2011, the Ligue de Football Professionnel (LFP) confirmed that French television channel Canal+ had acquired four television packages for the next four seasons beginning with the 2012–13 and ending with the 2015–16 season. The organization also announced that independent broadcaster Al Jazeera had acquired two packages. The combined deals are valued at €510 million per season.

== Schedule ==
To coincide with the new television rights deal, the LFP announced that the match days would be re-arranged. Beginning with the 2012–13 season, there will be one match played on Friday night at 21:00. On Saturday, a match will be contested at 17:00. At 19:00, four matches will be played and that will be followed by a match at 21:00. On Sunday, the early match will be played at 14:00. This will be followed by a match at 19:00. Finally, at 21:00, the match day will conclude with the showcase match.

== Supercup in the United States ==
On 5 April 2012, the LFP announced that, for the fourth consecutive season, the Trophée des champions will be held on international soil. The match will be played in Harrison, New Jersey, at the Red Bull Arena and will be contested by the winner of Ligue 1 and the winner of the Coupe de France. The match will be played on 28 July 2012. Like the previous three years, the idea will be to promote French football abroad, but this time more specifically in the United States.

== DNCG rulings ==
=== Ligue 2 ===
On 11 July 2012, following a preliminary review of each club's administrative and financial accounts in Ligue 2, the DNCG ruled that Le Mans would be relegated to the Championnat National. Following the announcement, Le Mans club president Henri Legarda announced that the club would appeal the decision, stating the "shareholders will play their part and the club will go after every possible step to restore its rightful place in the sport".

=== National ===
On 12 June 2012, following a preliminary review of each club's administrative and financial accounts in the Championnat National, the DNCG ruled that Cherbourg would be relegated to the Championnat de France amateur due to the club possessing a financial debt of €200,000. Following the announcement, Cherbourg president Gérard Gohel announced that the club would appeal the decision. On 5 July, the DNCG reversed its decision to relegate Cherbourg after the club gained the €200,000 required to remain in the division.

== Managerial changes ==
=== Ligue 1 ===
Team	Outgoing head coach	Manner of departure	Date of vacancy	Position in table	Incoming head coach	Date of appointment	Position in table
Nice	(France) René Marsiglia	Fired	21 May 2012	Off-season	(France) Claude Puel	24 May 2012	Off-season
Brest	(France) Corentin Martins	Mutual consent	31 May 2012	Off-season	(France) Landry Chauvin	31 May 2012	Off-season
Ajaccio	(France) Olivier Pantaloni	Resigned	14 June 2012	Off-season	(France) Alex Dupont	22 June 2012	Off-season
Marseille	(France) Didier Deschamps	Mutual consent	2 July 2012	Off-season	(France) Elie Baup	4 July 2012	Off-season
Evian	(Uruguay) Pablo Correa	Sacked	3 September 2012	18th	(France) Pascal Dupraz	3 September 2012	18th
Ajaccio	(France) Alex Dupont	Sacked	17 December 2012	14th	(France) Albert Emon	21 December 2012	14th
Nancy	(France) Jean Fernandez	Resigned	10 January 2013	20th	(France) Patrick Gabriel	11 January 2013	20th
Brest	(France) Landry Chauvin	Sacked	2 April 2013	18th	(France) Corentin Martins	4 April 2013	18th

=== Ligue 2 ===
Team	Outgoing head coach	Manner of departure	Date of vacancy	Position in table	Incoming head coach	Date of appointment	Position in table
Monaco	(Italy) Marco Simone	Fired	19 May 2012	Off-season	(Italy) Claudio Ranieri	30 May 2012	Off-season
Dijon	(France) Patrice Carteron	Mutual consent	24 May 2012	Off-season	(France) Olivier Dall'Oglio	1 June 2012	Off-season
Nîmes	(France) Thierry Froger	End of contract	25 May 2012	Off-season	(France) Victor Zvunka	1 June 2012	Off-season
Nantes	(France) Landry Chauvin	Joined Brest	31 May 2012	Off-season	(Armenia) Michel Der Zakarian	1 June 2012	Off-season
Clermont	(Armenia) Michel Der Zakarian	Resigned	30 May 2012	Off-season	(France) Régis Brouard	7 June 2012	Off-season
Caen	(France) Franck Dumas	Resigned	13 June 2012	Off-season	(France) Patrice Garande	18 June 2012	Off-season
Gazélec Ajaccio	(France) Dominique Veilex	Mutual consent	1 August 2012	15th	(France) Jean-Michel Cavalli	6 August 2012	18th
Tours	(Germany) Peter Zeidler	Fired	21 August 2012	20th	(France) Bernard Blaquart	21 August 2012	20th
Lens	(France) Jean-Louis Garcia	Fired	24 September 2012	15th	(France) Éric Sikora	24 September 2012	15th
Arles-Avignon	(France) Thierry Laurey	Fired	3 November 2012	18th	(France) Pierre Mosca (interim)	3 November 2012	18th
Le Havre	(France) Cédric Daury	Fired	12 November 2012	16th	(France) Erick Mombaerts	21 December 2012	9th
Auxerre	(France) Jean-Guy Wallemme	Mutual consent	2 December 2012	15th	(France) Bernard Casoni	3 December 2012	15th
Arles-Avignon	(France) Pierre Mosca (interim)	End of interim spell	11 February 2013	17th	(France) Noël Tosi	11 February 2013	17th
Gazélec Ajaccio	(France) Jean-Michel Cavalli	Fired	15 February 2013	19th	(France) Thierry Laurey	19 February 2013	19th
Le Mans	(France) Denis Zanko	Fired	24 April 2013	18th	(France) Régis Beunardeau	24 April 2013	18th

=== National ===
Team	Outgoing head coach	Manner of departure	Date of vacancy	Position in table	Incoming head coach	Date of appointment	Position in table
Rouen	(France) Emmanuel Da Costa	Mutual consent	18 May 2012	Off-season	(France) Didier Ollé-Nicolle	30 May 2012	Off-season
Quevilly	(France) Régis Brouard	Joined Clermont	30 May 2012	Off-season	(France) Laurent Hatton	6 June 2012	Off-season
Paris	(Cameroon) Alain Mboma	Resigned	18 May 2012	Off-season	(France) Olivier Guillou	22 June 2012	Off-season
Boulogne	(France) Pascal Plancque	Mutual consent	7 June 2012	Off-season	(France) Georges Tournay	23 June 2012	Off-season
Fréjus Saint-Raphaël	(France) Charly Paquille	Mutual consent	18 May 2012	Off-season	(France) Michel Estevan	1 July 2012	Off-season
Amiens	(France) Ludovic Batelli	Resigned	30 June 2012	Off-season	(France) Francis De Taddeo	1 July 2012	Off-season
Paris	(France) Olivier Guillou	Fired	5 October 2012	18th	(France) Alexandre Monier	5 October 2012	18th

== Competitions ==
Competition	Winner	Details	Match Report
Ligue 1	Paris Saint-Germain	2012–13 Ligue 1	
Ligue 2	Monaco	2012–13 Ligue 2	
Championnat National	US Créteil	2012–13 Championnat National	
Championnat de France amateur	USL Dunkerque	2012–13 Championnat de France Amateur Group A	
Championnat de France amateur	US Raon-l'Étape	2012–13 Championnat de France Amateur Group B	
Championnat de France amateur	US Colomiers	2012–13 Championnat de France Amateur Group C	
Championnat de France amateur	Vendée Luçon	2012–13 Championnat de France Amateur Group D	
Championnat de France amateur 2		2012–13 Championnat de France amateur 2	
Division 1 Féminine	Olympique Lyonnais	2012–13 Division 1 Féminine	
Coupe de France	Girondins de Bordeaux	2012–13 Coupe de France	
Coupe de la Ligue	Saint-Étienne	2012–13 Coupe de la Ligue	Report
Coupe de France Féminine		2012–13 Coupe de France Féminine	
Coupe Gambardella	Girondins de Bordeaux	2012–13 Coupe Gambardella	
Trophée des Champions	Olympique Lyonnais	2012 Trophée des Champions	

=== International competitions ===
==== Men's ====
Team / Competition	UEFA Champions League	UEFA Europa League
Montpellier	Group stage Eliminated	Did not qualify
Paris Saint-Germain	Quarter-finals eliminated by (Spain) Barcelona	Did not qualify
Lille	Group stage Eliminated	Did not qualify
Lyon	Did not qualify	Round of 32 eliminated by (England) Tottenham Hotspur
Bordeaux	Did not qualify	Round of 16 eliminated by (Portugal) Benfica
Marseille	Did not qualify	Group stage Eliminated

==== Women's ====
Team / Competition	UEFA Women's Champions League
Lyon	Runner-up eliminated by (Germany) VfL Wolfsburg
Juvisy	Semifinals eliminated by (France) Lyon

== National teams ==
=== France ===
Friendly

15 August 2012	France	0 – 0	Uruguay	Stade Océane, Le Havre
20:45 CEST		Report		Attendance: 25,000; Referee: Daniele Orsato (Italy)

12 October 2012	France	0 – 1	Japan	Stade de France, Saint-Denis
21:00 CET		Report	Kagawa 86'	Attendance: 60,205; Referee: William Collum (Scotland)

14 November 2012	Italy	1 – 2	France	Stadio Ennio Tardini, Parma
20:50 CET	El Shaarawy 35'	Report	Valbuena 37'; Gomis 67'	Attendance: 20000; Referee: Alberto Undiano Mallenco (Spain)

6 February 2013	France	1 – 2	Germany	Stade de France
21:00	Valbuena 44'	Summary	Müller 51'; Khedira 74'	Attendance: 75,000; Referee: (Italy) Paolo Mazzoleni

5 June 2013	Uruguay	1 – 0	France	Estadio Centenario
21:00	Suárez 50'			Attendance: 35,000; Referee: Julio César Quintana (Paraguay

9 June 2013	Brazil	3 – 0	France	Arena do Grêmio
21:00	Oscar 54'; Neymar 85'; Lucas 90'			Attendance: 51,919; Referee: Víctor Hugo Carrillo Peru

2014 FIFA World Cup qualification

Group Stage; 7 September 2012	Finland	0 – 1	France	Helsinki Olympic Stadium, Helsinki
20:30 CEST		Report	Diaby 20'	Referee: Craig Thomson (Scotland)

Group Stage; 11 September 2012	France	3 – 1	Belarus	Stade de France, Saint-Denis
21:00 CEST	Capoue 49'; Jallet 68'; Ribéry 80'	Report	Putsila 72'	Referee: Hüseyin Göçek (Turkey)

Group Stage; 16 October 2012	Spain	1 – 1	France	Vicente Calderón Stadium, Madrid
21:00 CET	Ramos 24'	Report	Giroud 90+4'	Referee: Felix Brych (Germany)

Group Stage; 22 March 2013	France	3 – 1	Georgia	Stade de France
21:00	Giroud 45+1'; Valbuena 47'; Ribéry 61'	Summary	Kobakhidze 71'; Amisulashvili (yellow card) 79'	Attendance: 77,000; Referee: (Croatia) Ivan Bebek

Group Stage; 26 March 2013	France	0 – 1	Spain	Stade de France
21:00	Cabaye (yellow card) 54'; Matuidi (yellow card) 68'; Pogba (yellow card) 77' (yellow-red card) 78'	Summary	Xavi (yellow card) 32'; Pedro 58'; Fàbregas (yellow card) 78'; Arbeloa (yellow card) 86'	Attendance: 80,000; Referee: (Hungary) Viktor Kassai

Last updated: 16 October 2012
Source: French Football Federation

=== France (women's) ===
UEFA Women's Euro 2013 qualification

Group Stage; 15 September 2012	France	4 – 0	Republic of Ireland	Stade du Roudourou, Guingamp
20:50 CEST	Thomis 8'; Le Sommer 12', 43'; Morel 86'	Report		Referee: Mihaela Gurdon Basimamović (Croatia)

Group Stage; 19 September 2012	Scotland	0 – 5	France	Tynecastle Stadium, Edinburgh
20:45 CEST		Report	Delie 17', 72'; Le Sommer 34', 66'; Nécib 64'	Referee: Silvia Tea Spinelli (Italy)

Friendly

20 October 2012	France	2 – 2	England	Stade Sébastien Charléty, Paris
20:50 CEST	Delie 59', 83'	Report	Houghton 34'; Scott 39'	Attendance: 5,914; Referee: Silvia Tea Spinelli (Italy)

24 October 2012	Netherlands	1 – 1	France	Philips Stadion, Eindhoven
19:00 CEST	Spitse 61'	Report	Le Sommer 89'	Attendance: 1,500; Referee: Maarten Ketting (Netherlands)

29 November 2012	Germany	1 – 1	France	Erdgas Sportpark
15:15 CEST		Summary

13 February 2013	France	3 – 3	Germany	Stade de la Meinau
	Nécib 15', 22'; Delie 53'		Schmidt 12'; Kessler 66', 81'	Attendance: 15,888; Referee: Pernilla Larsson

6 March 2013	France	2–2	Brazil	Stade Marcel-Picot, Nancy
	Le Sommer 57'; Thiney 86' (pen.)	Report	Giovania 32', 79'	Attendance: 16,752; Referee: Alexandra Ihringova

9 March 2013	France	1–1	Brazil	Stade Robert-Diochon, Le Petit-Quevilly
	Nécib 96'	Report	Georges 48' (o.g.)	Attendance: 6,884; Referee: Simona Ghisletta

4 April 2013	France	1–1	Canada	Stade du Ray, Nice
	Thomis 45'	Report	Kyle 95'	Attendance: 5,583; Referee: Jana Adamkova

1 June 2013	France	3–0	Finland	Stade du Hainaut, Valenciennes
	Delie 32', 59'; Thiney 37'	Report		Attendance: 11,417; Referee: Sandra Braz Bastos

Last updated: 7 August 2014
Source: French Football Federation

=== France U-21 ===
2013 UEFA European Under-21 Football Championship qualification

7 September 2012	Slovakia	2 – 1	France	NTC Senec, Senec
18:45 CEST	Žilák 21'; Oršula 67'	Report	Varane 4'	Referee: Steven McLean (Scotland)

Friendly

10 September 2012	France	4 – 0	Chile	Stade Marcel-Deflandre, La Rochelle
20:50 CET	Knockaert 53'; Fofana 66'; Lacazette 77'; Cabella 87'	Report		Referee: Félix Zwayer (Germany)

2013 UEFA European Under-21 Football Championship qualification playoffs

12 October 2012	France	1 – 0	Norway	Stade Océane, Le Havre
18:45 CEST	Varane 22'	Report		Referee: Kristo Tohver (Estonia)

16 October 2012	Norway	5 – 3	France	Marienlyst Stadion, Drammen
18:00 CEST	Singh 13' (pen.); Nielsen 19'; Rogne 27'; Konradsen 57'; Berget 66'	Report	Guilavogui 29'; Lacazette 84'; Griezmann 87'	Referee: Paolo Valeri (Italy)

Last updated: 16 October 2012
Source: French Football Federation U-21 Schedule

=== France U-20 ===
Four Nations Tournament

7 September 2012	China	0 – 0	France	Qinhuangdao Stadium, Qinhuangdao
13:30 CET		Report

9 September 2012	France	3 – 1	North Korea	Qinhuangdao Stadium, Qinhuangdao
10:00 CET	Plea 47', 69'; Pogba 57'	Report	88'

11 September 2012	France	3 – 1	Mexico	Qinhuangdao Stadium, Qinhuangdao
10:00 CET	Ngando 35'; Plea 63'; Bosetti 73'	Report	Romo 85'

Friendly

13 November 2012	France	2 – 0	Ukraine	TBD, Mont-de-Marsan
	Veretout 30'; Thavin 57'		Budkivskiy 22'

5 February 2013	France	2 – 0	Portugal	Stade Dominique Duvauchelle, Créteil
		Report		Attendance: 5,000

21 March 2013	France	3 – 1	Denmark	Stade de la Vallée du Cher, Tours
	Digne 5'; Thauvin 35'; Doucouré 53'	[www.fff.fr/equipes-de-france/4/u20/matchs/1680/2013-03-21/france-danemark Report]	Brock-Madsen 25'	Attendance: 2,600

25 March 2013	France	3 – 0	Romania	Stade des Allées, Blois
	Bahebeck 2'; Thauvin 52', 84'	[www.fff.fr/equipes-de-france/4/u20/matchs/1681/2013-03-25/france-roumanie Report]

Last updated: 24 October 2012
Source: French Football Federation U-20 Schedule

=== France U-19 ===
Friendly

8 September 2012	Switzerland	0 – 1	France	Stade de la Fontenette, Carouge
18:00 CET			Rodrigues 80'

14 November 2012	Germany	3 – 0	France	Rheinstadion, Kehl
		[www.fff.fr/equipes-de-france/6/u19/matchs/1659/2012-11-14/allemagne-france Report]

5 February 2013	Croatia	2 – 2	France	Gradski Stadium, Umag
		Report

21 March 2013	France	1 – 1	Denmark	Stade Jacques Fourroux, Auch
		Report

23 March 2013	France	2 – 0	Sweden	Stade Jacques Fourroux, Auch
		Report

2013 UEFA European Under-19 Football Championship First Round qualification

11 October 2012	France	2 – 1	Israel	Complexo Desportivo De Anadia, Anadia
16:00 CET	Sacko 27'; Laporte 74'	Report	Raiyan 8'	Referee: Pavle Radovanović (Montenegro)

13 October 2012	France	6 – 0	Latvia	Estádio Municipal Dr. Américo Couto, Mealhada
16:00 CET	Rabiot 8'; Rougeaux 55'; Benzia 63'; Nguette 66'; Haller 79'; Sacko 90+1'	Report		Referee: Pavle Radovanović (Montenegro)

16 October 2012	Portugal	2 – 2	France	Estádio Municipal Sérgio Conceição, Coimbra
17:00 CET	Lopes 41'; Mané 46'	Report	Rougeaux 13'; Benzia 53'	Referee: Steven McLean (Scotland)

Last updated: 24 October 2012
Source: French Football Federation U-19 Schedule

=== France U-18 ===
Friendly

6 September 2012	Austria	1 – 4	France	Schubertk Stadium, Melk
18:30 CET	64'	Report	Rabiot 18'; Bahlouli 47'; Martial 74'; Labidi 85'

19 March 2013	France	4 – 0	United States	Stade Pierre Pibarot, Clairefontaine-en-Yvelines
		Report

22 March 2013	Germany	2 – 3	France	Meppen
		Report

15 May 2013	France	2 – 0	Switzerland	Boé
		Report

2012 Tournio de Limoges

31 October 2012	France	4 – 0	Uruguay	Stade Beaublanc, Limoges
19:00 CET

2 November 2012	France	5 – 1	Norway	Stade Beaublanc, Limoges
19:00 CET

4 November 2012	France	1 – 1	Portugal	Stade Beaublanc, Limoges
19:00 CET

Last updated: 24 October 2012
Source: French Football Federation U-18 Schedule

=== France U-17 ===
2013 UEFA European Under-17 Football Championship First Round qualification

24 September 2012	France	3 – 1	Bosnia and Herzegovina	Asim Ferhatović Hase Stadium, Sarajevo
15:00 CET	Cornet 15'; Coman 61'; Coulibaly 73'	Report	Radovac 32'	Referee: Aleksandr Gauzer (Kazakhstan)

26 September 2012	Slovenia	1 – 0	France	Gradski SRC Slavija Stadium, Sarajevo
15:00 CET	Ožbolt 42' (pen.)	Report		Referee: Aleksandr Gauzer (Kazakhstan)

29 September 2012	France	2 – 2	Greece	Gradski SRC Slavija Stadium, Sarajevo
15:00 CET	Pereira de Sa 49'; Cornet 80+2'	Report	Donis 75'; Saliakas 80'	Referee: Eiko Saar (Estonia)

2013 UEFA European Under-17 Championship elite round

21 March 2013	Belgium	1 – 4	France	Stadion Hrvatski vitezovi, Dugopolje
15:00 CET	Schrijvers 64'	Report	Maupay 12', 33'; Coman 20'; Cornet 79'	Referee: Kevin Azzopardi (Malta)

23 March 2013	Croatia	1 – 0	France	Igralište Blato, Stobreč
15:00 CET	Coulibaly 7' (o.g.)	Report		Referee: Christian Dingert (Germany)

26 March 2013	France	3 – 2	Spain	Stadion Pricviće, Žrnovnica
15:00 CET	Coulibaly 10'; Cornet 20'; Houri 79'	Report	Núñez 28'; Chirivella 72' (pen.)	Referee: Christian Dingert (Germany)

Friendly

30 October 2012	France	1 – 0	Romania	Stade Saint-Jean, Anglet
18:00 CET		Report

1 November 2012	France	2 – 0	Romania	Complexe Sportif de Lons, Lons
15:00 CET		Report

29 January 2013	Israel	0 – 2	France	National Complex, Shefayim
		Report

31 January 2013	Israel	0 – 3	France	National Complex, Shefayim
		Report

Last updated: 26 March 2013
Source: Federation U-17 Schedule

=== France U-16 ===
Friendly

18 September 2012	Wales	0 – 6	France	Stebonheath Park, Llanelli
21:00 CET		Report	Faupala 15'; Boga 30'; Labissière 49'; Epaillard 55'; Aye 61', 65'

20 September 2012	Wales	0 – 1	France	Jenner Park Stadium, Barry
12:00 CET		Report	Epaillard 12'

5 March 2013	Romania	4 – 2	France	Centre National du football, Mogoșoaia
		Report

7 March 2013	Romania	2 – 2	France	Centre National du football, Mogoșoaia
		[www.fff.fr/equipes-de-france/12/u16/matchs/1704/2013-03-07/roumanie-france Report]

13 April 2013	France	3 – 2	Czech Republic	Las Rozas de Madrid
		Report

14 April 2013	Italy	3 – 2	France	Las Rozas de Madrid
		Report

16 April 2013	Spain	1 – 0	France	Las Rozas de Madrid
		Report

4 June 2013	Germany	2 – 2	France	Olympiastadion, Berlin
		Report

2012 Tournoi du Val-de-Marne

30 October 2012	France	3 – 0	Norway	Parc des Sports, Maisons-Alfort
14:00 CET	Ntambwe 15'; Faupala 21'; Sagun 67'	Report

1 November 2012	France	1 – 0	Croatia	Stade Jean Bouin, Choisy-le-Roi
16:00 CET	Onguene 40'	Report

3 November 2012	France	1 – 0	Netherlands	Complexe Sportif Léo-Lagrange, Bonneuil-sur-Marne
16:00 CET	Prohouly 17'	Report

2013 Aegean Cup

21 January 2013	France	3 – 2	Belgium	7 Eylül Stadium, Turgutlu
		Report

22 January 2013	France	1 – 0	Ukraine	Ilçe Stadium, Kula
		Report

24 January 2013	France	3 – 1	Czech Republic	Ilçe Stadium, Kula
		Report

26 January 2013	Turkey	1 – 1	France	Ilçe Stadium, Akhisar
		Report

2013 Montaigu Tournament

26 March 2013	France	2 – 2	Turkey	Montaigu
	Pendant 25'; Tell 80+2'	Report	41' Polat; 66' Hakan

28 March 2013	France	2 – 3	Japan	Montaigu
	Tell 15'; Augustin 21'	[www.fff.fr/equipes-de-france/12/u16/matchs/1714/2013-03-28/france-japon Report]	6' Goddard; 22', 70' Sugimori

28 March 2013	France	4 – 1	Portugal	Montaigu
	St Maximin 35'; Pendant 42'; Makiadi 58'; Tell 70'	Report	6' (pen.) Delgado

1 April 2013	Germany	1 – 2	France	Montaigu
	Fiore Tapia 65'	Report	36' Augustin; 72' Sabri Toufiqui

Last updated: 4 June 2013
Source: French Football Federation U-16 Schedule
