= 2015–16 Ligue 2 =

77th season of the second-tier football league in France

Ligue 2
- Season: 2015–16
- Champions: Nancy
- Promoted: Nancy; Dijon; Metz
- Relegated: Évian; Créteil; Paris
- Matches: 380
- Goals: 875 (2.3 per match)
- Top goalscorer: Famara Diédhiou (Clermont) (21 goals)
- Longest winning run: 6 games Dijon
- Longest unbeaten run: 15 games Dijon
- Longest winless run: 28 games Paris
- Longest losing run: 5 games Évian
- Highest attendance: 36,254; Lens - Valenciennes
- Average attendance: 7,118

The 2015–16 Ligue 2 season was the 77th season since its establishment.

== Teams ==
There are 20 clubs in the league, with three promoted teams from Championnat National replacing the three teams that were relegated to the same level, and three relegated teams from Ligue 1 replacing the three teams that were promoted to the same level. All clubs that secured Ligue 2 status for the season were subject to approval by the DNCG before becoming eligible to participate.

The first team to officially join the division for the 2015–16 was Lens, who were relegated from Ligue 1 on 2 May 2015 as results on the day went against them. They were joined a week later by Metz, after a 4–0 home defeat against Lorient. The last relegated club were Evian after a 2-1 defeat on 16 May 2015.

Red Star were the first team promoted from National, after a 4–0 victory against Istres on 8 May 2015, marking their return to the professional levels after sixteen years in the amateur leagues. Paris FC and Bourg-Péronnas only gained the right to promote on the last day of the season, when Paris FC drew 0–0 against CA Bastia and Bourg-Péronnas won 1–0 against Boulogne.

Only 2 teams were planned to be promoted and relegated this season but the decision was later overturned by an appeal to the Conseil d'État and the French Football Federation.

=== Stadia and locations ===
Location of teams in 2015–16 Ligue 2

Club	Location	Venue	Capacity
Ajaccio	Ajaccio	Stade François Coty	10,660
Auxerre	Auxerre	Stade de l'Abbé-Deschamps	21,379
Bourg-en-Bresse	Bourg-en-Bresse	Stade Marcel-Verchère^{1}	11,400
Brest	Brest	Stade Francis-Le Blé	15,097
Clermont Foot	Clermont-Ferrand	Stade Gabriel Montpied	11,980
Créteil	Créteil	Stade Dominique Duvauchelle	12,050
Dijon	Dijon	Stade Gaston Gérard	16,098
Évian	Annecy	Parc des Sports	15,660
Laval	Laval	Stade Francis Le Basser	18,607
Le Havre	Le Havre	Stade Océane	25,000
Lens	Lens	Stade Bollaert-Delelis	35,000
Metz	Metz	Stade Saint-Symphorien	24,500
Nancy	Tomblaine	Stade Marcel Picot	20,087
Nîmes	Nîmes	Stade des Costières	18,482
Niort	Niort	Stade René Gaillard	10,886
Paris	Paris	Stade Sébastien Charléty	20,000
Red Star	Saint-Ouen	Stade Pierre Brisson^{2}	10,178
Sochaux	Montbéliard	Stade Auguste Bonal	20,000
Tours	Tours	Stade de la Vallée du Cher	16,247
Valenciennes	Valenciennes	Stade du Hainaut	25,172

- ^{1} Bourg-Péronnas original stadium, Stade Municipal de Péronnas, is not homologated to host professional matches. The club will play its home games in Bourg-en-Bresse at Stade Marcel-Verchère, home stadium of the Bressane rugby union team, after the stadium's renovation. Bourg-Péronnas will play its first games at Stade Jean Laville in Gueugnon.
- ^{2} Red Star original stadium, Stade Bauer, is not homologated to host professional matches. The club will play its home games at Stade Pierre Brisson in Beauvais. Additionally, Red Star will host a number of games to be determined later at Stade de France in Saint-Denis.

=== Personnel and kits ===
Team	Manager^{1}	Captain^{1}	Kit Manufacturer^{1}	Main Sponsor^{1}
Ajaccio	(France) Olivier Pantaloni	(France) Johan Cavalli	Macron	Suite Home
Auxerre	(France) Jean-Luc Vannuchi	(France) Sébastien Puygrenier	Airness	Remarques LOUALT, Vitrans
Bourg-en-Bresse	(France) Hervé Della Maggiore	(France) Yannick Goyon	adidas	BestDrive
Brest	(France) Alex Dupont	(France) Bruno Grougi	Nike	Quéguiner
Clermont	(France) Corinne Diacre	(Guadeloupe) Cédric Avinel	Patrick	Crédit Mutuel
Créteil	(France) Laurent Roussey	(France) Jean-Michel Lesage	adidas	SFB Béton, Holcim
Dijon	(France) Olivier Dall'Oglio	(France) Cédric Varrault	Kappa	DVF, Doras, IPS
Evian	(France) Romain Revelli	(France) Olivier Sorlin	Kappa	MSC Croisières
Laval	(France) Denis Zanko	(France) Anthony Gonçalves	Kappa	Lactel
Le Havre	(United States) Bob Bradley	(France) Yohann Rivière	Nike	Api
Lens	(New Caledonia) Antoine Kombouaré	(Argentina) Pablo Chavarría	Umbro	Azerbaijan: Land of Fire
Metz	(France) Philippe Hinschberger	(France) Kevin Lejeune	Nike	Moselle|
Nancy	(Uruguay) Pablo Correa	(Morocco) Youssouf Hadji	Nike	Dane Elec
Nîmes	(France) Bernard Blaquart	(France) Toifilou Maoulida	Erreà	Marie Blachère
Niort	(France) Denis Renaud	(France) Jimmy Roye	Puma	Restaurant Le Billon (home), Cheminées Poujoulat (away)
Paris	(France) Jean-Luc Vasseur	(Ivory Coast) Hervé Libohy	Nike	Vinci
Red Star	(Portugal) Rui Almeida	(France) Vincent Planté	adidas	
Sochaux	(France) Albert Cartier	(Brazil) Matheus Vivian	Lotto	Peugeot
Tours	(Italy) Marco Simone	(France) Bryan Bergougnoux	Nike	Corsicatours
Valenciennes	(Bosnia and Herzegovina) Faruk Hadžibegić	(France) Yunis Abdelhamid	Uhlsport	GDE Recyclage

^{1}Subject to change during the season.

=== Managerial changes ===
Team	Outgoing manager	Manner of departure	Date of vacancy	Position in table	Incoming manager	Date of appointment
Paris FC	(France) Christophe Taine	Mutual consent	4 June 2015	Pre-season	(France) Denis Renaud	5 June 2015
Red Star	(France) Sébastien Robert	Mutual consent	6 June 2015	Pre-season	(Portugal) Rui Almeida	12 June 2015
FC Metz	(France) Albert Cartier	Mutual consent	16 June 2015	Pre-season	(Belgium) José Riga	16 June 2015
Tours	(France) Gilbert Zoonekynd	Mutual consent	25 June 2015	Pre-season	(Italy) Marco Simone	25 June 2015
Evian	(France) Pascal Dupraz	Mutual consent	11 July 2015	Pre-season	(Bosnia and Herzegovina) Safet Sušić	11 July 2015
Sochaux	(France) Olivier Echouafni	Sacked	12 September 2015	18th	(France) Albert Cartier	3 October 2015
Le Havre AC	(France) Thierry Goudet	Sacked	28 September 2015	15th	(United States) Bob Bradley	10 November 2015
Nîmes	(France) José Pasqualetti	Resigned	21 November 2015	20th	(France) Bernard Blaquart	1 December 2015
Paris FC	(France) Denis Renaud	Sacked	28 November 2015	18th	(France) Jean-Luc Vasseur	29 November 2015
Créteil	(France) Thierry Froger	Sacked	9 December 2015	14th	(France) Laurent Roussey	9 December 2015
FC Metz	(Belgium) José Riga	Mutual consent	23 December 2015	6th	(France) Philippe Hinschberger	24 December 2015
Valenciennes	(France) David Le Frapper	Sacked	28 December 2015	17th	(Bosnia and Herzegovina) Faruk Hadžibegić	15 January 2016
Evian	(Bosnia and Herzegovina) Safet Sušić	Sacked	11 January 2016	13th	(France) Romain Revelli	11 January 2016
Niort	(France) Régis Brouard	Sacked	29 February 2016	17th	(France) Denis Renaud	9 May 2016

== League table ==
Pos	Team	Pld	W	D	L	GF	GA	GD	Pts	Promotion or Relegation
1	Nancy (C, P)	38	21	11	6	60	32	+28	74	Promotion to Ligue 1
2	Dijon (P)	38	20	10	8	62	36	+26	70	Promotion to Ligue 1
3	Metz (P)	38	19	8	11	54	39	+15	65	Promotion to Ligue 1
4	Le Havre	38	19	8	11	52	37	+15	65	
5	Red Star	38	18	10	10	43	38	+5	64	
6	Lens	38	15	13	10	39	35	+4	58	
7	Clermont Foot	38	16	10	12	56	53	+3	58	
8	Auxerre	38	15	10	13	47	46	+1	55	
9	Tours	38	11	14	13	36	41	−5	47	
10	Brest	38	12	11	15	34	41	−7	47	
11	Bourg-en-Bresse	38	13	8	17	47	59	−12	47	
12	Valenciennes	38	10	14	14	39	43	−4	44	
13	Laval	38	9	17	12	35	42	−7	44	
14	Nîmes (Note: Nîmes was docked 8 points for match fixing in the 2013–14 season.)	38	13	12	13	50	52	−2	43	
15	Sochaux	38	9	15	14	34	36	−2	42	
16	Niort	38	8	18	12	38	45	−7	42	
17	Ajaccio	38	9	15	14	34	42	−8	42	
18	Evian (Note: Evian was demoted due to financial difficulties.) (R, D)	38	9	12	17	41	41	0	39	Demotion to Division d'Honneur Régionale
19	Créteil (R)	38	8	10	20	42	66	−24	34	Relegation to Championnat National
20	Paris FC (R)	38	4	18	16	32	51	−19	30	Relegation to Championnat National

Source: Ligue 2
Rules for classification: 1) points; 2) goal difference; 3) number of goals scored; 4) head-to-head goal difference; 5) fair play points
(C) Champions; (D) Disqualified; (P) Promoted; (R) Relegated

== Results ==
Home \ Away	ACA	AUX	BPE	BRE	CLE	CRE	DIJ	ETG	LAV	HAC	LEN	MET	NAL	NIM	NIO	PFC	RS	SOC	TOU	VAL
Ajaccio	—	1–0	2–0	2–1	3–1	3–0	0–0	1–1	0–0	1–1	1–1	0–1	2–1	2–0	2–0	0–0	1–2	0–2	1–2	1–1
Auxerre	0–0	—	1–2	0–0	1–0	3–1	2–0	3–1	2–3	1–3	1–2	4–0	2–2	1–0	1–1	2–0	0–1	2–1	2–1	1–1
Bourg-en-Bresse	3–0	1–1	—	3–1	1–2	5–1	2–1	0–2	0–0	1–3	2–1	0–3	2–0	4–2	2–1	4–1	0–1	2–1	0–2	0–0
Brest	1–0	0–0	2–1	—	1–2	2–1	0–0	0–2	0–0	0–0	2–1	1–1	1–1	2–0	1–1	1–0	0–1	1–0	3–0	1–2
Clermont Foot	2–1	1–2	3–2	2–0	—	1–0	2–3	4–1	4–1	2–1	2–2	2–1	1–2	1–0	2–1	1–1	0–2	0–0	0–1	2–0
Créteil	2–2	1–0	2–1	0–2	0–3	—	0–1	0–0	0–0	2–1	1–1	1–2	0–3	1–2	2–3	0–0	2–4	1–1	2–2	0–1
Dijon	2–0	0–0	3–0	3–1	4–1	4–1	—	1–3	2–0	2–1	2–0	0–4	0–0	0–1	3–0	3–0	0–0	2–2	3–0	1–0
Evian Thonon Gaillard	0–2	4–0	1–1	0–2	2–2	1–2	1–2	—	0–0	1–1	2–1	0–1	0–1	4–1	0–0	1–0	0–1	0–0	0–0	4–0
Laval	0–0	4–1	1–3	2–0	1–1	3–2	2–2	2–1	—	0–1	1–1	0–1	0–1	3–2	0–0	3–1	2–1	1–2	1–1	0–3
Le Havre	1–0	1–0	5–0	0–0	0–1	1–0	0–2	3–2	2–0	—	2–0	1–1	1–3	3–1	0–0	2–1	0–2	2–1	2–0	3–2
Lens	2–0	3–0	2–0	2–0	1–1	1–1	1–1	1–0	1–1	0–4	—	1–0	1–0	1–0	1–1	0–1	1–1	1–0	1–1	0–1
Metz	3–2	0–1	5–0	2–2	2–2	2–1	1–2	2–1	1–0	0–1	0–0	—	0–0	1–2	2–0	2–1	2–0	1–0	2–1	2–0
Nancy	3–0	0–1	3–1	3–0	3–1	1–0	3–1	1–0	1–0	3–1	1–0	2–2	—	3–4	1–1	3–2	2–0	1–0	0–0	1–0
Nîmes	0–0	2–1	1–1	2–0	6–2	1–3	1–1	0–0	1–1	2–2	4–2	2–1	2–2	—	1–0	1–1	1–1	0–2	2–1	2–0
Niort	3–1	2–3	0–0	1–2	1–1	4–2	2–2	0–3	0–1	0–0	0–1	1–1	0–0	1–0	—	2–1	0–0	1–1	0–0	0–1
Paris	0–0	2–2	2–0	1–1	0–0	2–2	0–3	0–0	1–1	3–0	0–1	1–2	1–1	0–0	1–1	—	0–1	0–0	1–3	1–4
Red Star	1–1	0–2	1–0	1–0	2–1	0–1	3–2	2–2	2–0	2–1	1–2	3–1	0–1	1–0	0–2	2–4	—	0–0	1–1	1–5
Sochaux	3–0	2–3	1–1	2–1	2–0	0–3	0–1	1–0	0–0	1–0	0–0	0–1	2–2	0–0	2–3	1–1	1–2	—	0–0	1–0
Tours	1–1	3–1	0–1	2–1	1–1	1–2	1–0	2–1	1–1	0–1	0–1	2–0	2–5	1–2	1–2	0–0	0–0	1–0	—	1–0
Valenciennes	1–1	0–0	1–1	0–1	1–2	2–2	1–3	1–0	0–0	0–1	0–1	2–1	1–0	2–2	3–3	1–1	0–0	2–2	0–0	—

Source: Ligue 2
Legend: Blue = home team win; Yellow = draw; Red = away team win.
For upcoming matches, an "a" indicates there is an article about the rivalry between the two participants.

== Season statistics ==
=== Top goalscorers ===
As of matches played on 13 May 2016.

Rank	Player	Club	Goals
1	(Senegal) Famara Diédhiou	Clermont	21
2	(France) Lys Mousset	Le Havre	14
3	(France) Maurice Dalé	Nancy	13
3	(Cameroon) Ande Dona Ndoh	Niort	13
5	(Senegal) Pape Sané	Bourg-Pérronas	12
5	(France) Yeni Ngbakoto	Metz	12

Source: Official Goalscorers' Standings

== Attendances ==
#	Club	Average
1	Lens	26,393
2	Nancy	15,108
3	Metz	13,279
4	Sochaux	8,942
5	Valenciennes	8,805
6	Dijon	8,108
7	Le Havre	7,620
8	Nîmes	6,891
9	Stade brestois	6,887
10	Stade lavallois	5,442
11	AJ auxerroise	5,381
12	Tours	4,969
13	Évian	4,015
14	Clermont	3,865
15	Chamois niortais	3,803
16	Ajaccio	3,322
17	Paris FC	3,227
18	Créteil	2,273
19	FBBP	2,112
20	Red Star	1,914
