= 2011–12 Olympique de Marseille season =

Marseille
2011–12 season
- Chairman: Vincent Labrune
- Manager: Didier Deschamps
- Ground: Stade Vélodrome
- Ligue 1: 10th
- Coupe de France: Quarter-finals
- Coupe de la Ligue: Winners
- Trophée des Champions: Winners
- UEFA Champions League: Quarter-finals
- Top goalscorer: League: Loïc Rémy (12); All: Loïc Rémy (20)
- Highest home attendance: 41,512 (27 November vs PSG, Ligue 1)
- Lowest home attendance: 12,567 (1 February vs Nice, Coupe de la Ligue)
Home colours	Away colours	Third colours

The 2011–12 season of Olympique de Marseille (OM) was the club's 62nd season in the Ligue 1. They participated in five competitions Ligue 1, UEFA Champions League, Coupe de France, Coupe de la Ligue and the Trophée des Champions, winning the last two.

== Key Events ==
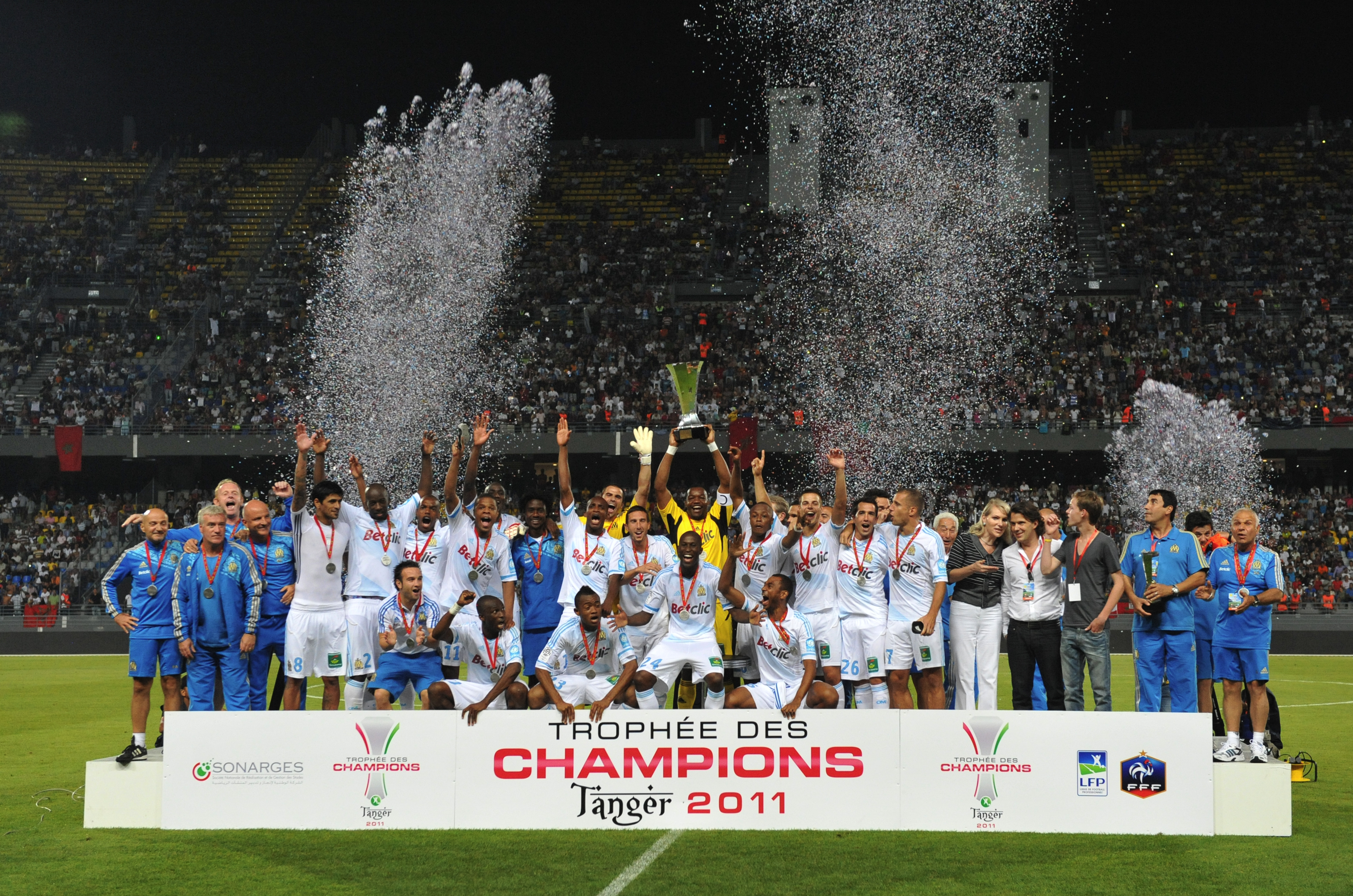
Marseille won the 2011 Trophée des champions.

- 21 May 2011: After months of speculation, Taye Taiwo joined Milan on a free transfer.
- 19 June 2011: Left-back Jérémy Morel joined OM from Lorient for a fee of €2.5 million.
- 29 June 2011: after the loss of Taye Taiwo, OM picked up Nicolas Nkoulou from Monaco for a reported €3.5 million.
- 4 July 2011: Defensive midfielder Alou Diarra joined for an undisclosed fee from Bordeaux. Diarra put pen to paper on a three-year deal.
- 21 July 2011: Argentine International left-back Gabriel Heinze left for Serie A club Roma. Roma picked up Heinze on a free transfer and signed him to a what is believed to be a one-year contract.
- 27 July 2011: In what turned out to be a nine-goal thriller, Marseille beat out competition Lille to win the 2011 Trophée des Champions 5–4. The game ended with two very late penalties converted by André Ayew. This is now the second year in a row that Marseille have won the Trophy.

== Players ==
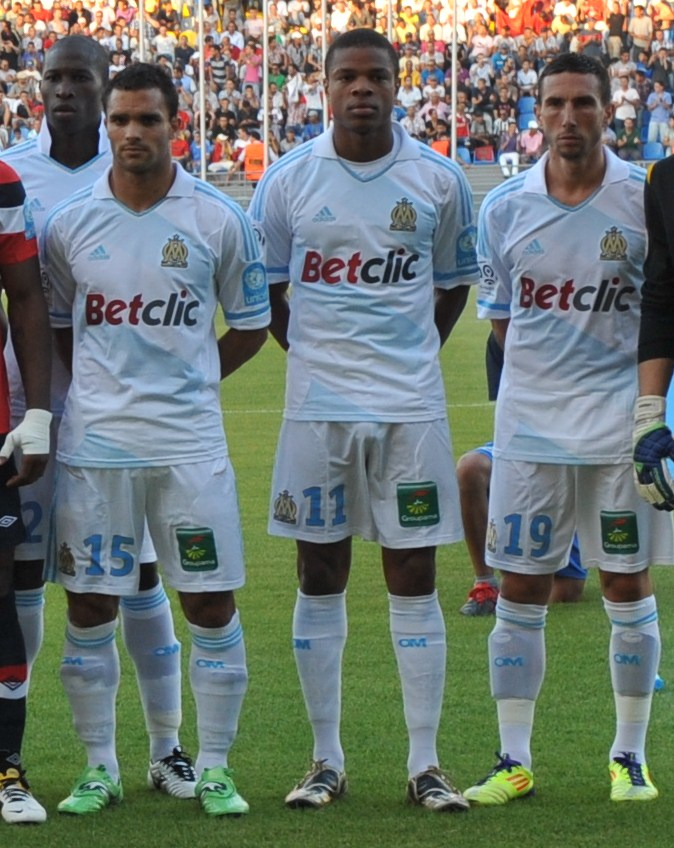
Rod Fanni, Jérémy Morel, Loïc Rémy and Morgan Amalfitano playing in the 2011 Trophée des champions.

=== First team squad ===
Updated 30 January 2012.

Note: Flags indicate national team as defined under FIFA eligibility rules; some limited exceptions apply. Players may hold more than one non-FIFA nationality.

No.	Pos.	Nation	Player
1	GK	FRA	Gennaro Bracigliano
2	DF	ESP	César Azpilicueta
3	DF	CMR	Nicolas Nkoulou
4	MF	FRA	Alou Diarra
7	MF	FRA	Benoît Cheyrou
9	FW	BRA	Brandão
10	FW	FRA	André-Pierre Gignac
11	FW	FRA	Loïc Rémy
12	MF	BFA	Charles Kaboré
13	DF	MLI	Djimi Traoré
15	DF	FRA	Jérémy Morel
16	GK	BRA	Elinton Andrade

No.	Pos.	Nation	Player
17	DF	CMR	Stéphane Mbia
18	MF	FRA	Morgan Amalfitano
20	FW	GHA	André Ayew
21	DF	SEN	Souleymane Diawara
23	FW	GHA	Jordan Ayew
24	DF	FRA	Rod Fanni
25	FW	FRA	Billel Omrani
26	DF	FRA	Jean-Philippe Sabo
28	MF	FRA	Mathieu Valbuena
29	FW	FRA	Chris Gadi
30	GK	FRA	Steve Mandanda (captain)
33	DF	FRA	Gérard Roland
40	GK	CMR	Jules Goda

=== Squad statistics ===
Appearances (subbed on), goals (own Goals)
yellow cards (double Yellow cards), red cards
Statistics accurate as of 8 August 2011

No.	Pos.	Name	League		Cups		Europe		Total		Discipline	
No.	Pos.	Name	Apps	Goals	Apps	Goals	Apps	Goals	Apps	Goals	Yellow card	Red card
1	GK	(France) Gennaro Bracigliano	0	0	2	0	0	0	2	0	0	0
2	DF	(Spain) César Azpilicueta	16(1)	0	3	0	4	0	23(1)	0	4	0
3	DF	(Cameroon) Nicolas Nkoulou	17	0	2(1)	0	6	0	25(1)	0	4	0
4	MF	(France) Alou Diarra	16(3)	1	1(1)	0	6	0	24(4)	1	8	0
7	MF	(France) Benoît Cheyrou	13(3)	3	2	1	4(1)	0	20(4)	4	3	0
8	MF	(Argentina) Lucho González	14(5)	2	4	0	4(2)	1	23(7)	3	1	0
9	FW	(Brazil) Brandão	0(2)	0	1	1	0	0	1(2)	1	0	0
10	FW	(France) André-Pierre Gignac	1(8)	0	1	1	0(3)	0	2(11)	1	3	0
11	FW	(France) Loïc Rémy	20	9	4(2)	4	6	2	29(2)	16	2	0
12	MF	(Burkina Faso) Charles Kaboré	5(6)	0	2	0	2(2)	0	9(9)	0	1	1
13	DF	(Mali) Djimi Traoré	3(3)	0	3(1)	0	3	0	9(4)	0	0	0
15	MF	(France) Jérémy Morel	19	0	3	0	4	0	27	1	6	0
16	GK	(Brazil) Elinton Andrade	0	0	0	0	0	0	0	0	0	0
17	MF	(Cameroon) Stéphane Mbia	7	1	2	0	1(1)	0	11(1)	1	6	0
18	MF	(France) Morgan Amalfitano	15(3)	1	3	1	2(3)	0	21(6)	2	7	0
20	FW	(Ghana) André Ayew	16(1)	6	1	1	5	3	23(1)	13	6	0
21	DF	(Senegal) Souleymane Diawara	17	1	1	0	6	0	25	1	3	0
23	FW	(Ghana) Jordan Ayew	6(13)	2	2	3	2(3)	0	10(17)	5	6	1
24	DF	(France) Rod Fanni	10(3)	0	3	0	1(1)	0	15(4)	0	1	2
25	FW	(France) Billel Omrani	0(1)	0	0(2)	0	0	0	0(3)	0	0	0
26	DF	(France) Jean-Philippe Sabo	0(1)	0	1(2)	0	0(1)	0	1(4)	0	0	0
28	MF	(France) Mathieu Valbuena	15(4)	4	3(1)	3	4(1)	1	22(6)	8	6	0
30	GK	(France) Steve Mandanda	21	0	2	0	6	0	30	0	1	0

== Transfers ==
=== In ===
Squad #	Position	Player	Transferred From	Date	Fee	Source	Notes
18	MF	(France) Morgan Amalfitano	(France) Lorient	9 June 2011	Free		
15	DF	(France) Jérémy Morel	(France) Lorient	19 June 2011	€2.5 million		
3	DF	(Cameroon) Nicolas Nkoulou	(France) Monaco	29 June 2011	€3.5 million		
4	MF	(France) Alou Diarra	(France) Bordeaux	4 July 2011	Undisclosed		
1	GK	(France) Gennaro Bracigliano	(France) Nancy	5 July 2011	Free		

=== Out ===
Squad #	Position	Player	Transferred To	Date	Fee	Source	Notes
3	DF	(Nigeria) Taye Taiwo	(Italy) Milan	21 May 2011	Free		
5	DF	(Brazil) Hilton	(France) Montpellier	2 August 2011	Free		
20	DF	(Cameroon) Charley Fomen	(France) Clermont	4 August 2011	Free		
18	MF	(France) Fabrice Abriel	(France) Nice	4 August 2011	Free		
19	DF	(Argentina) Gabriel Heinze	(Italy) Roma	21 July 2011	Free		

=== Loan In ===
Squad #	Position	Player	Loan From	Date	Source	Notes

=== Loan out ===
Squad #	Position	Player	Loan To	Date	Source	Notes
	MF	(Togo) Senah Mango	(France) Monaco	30 June 2011		Until end of 2011–12 season
14	DF	(Senegal) Leyti N'Diaye	(France) Ajaccio	11 July 2011		Until end of 2011–12 season
9	FW	(Brazil) Brandão	(Brazil) Cruzeiro	19 March 2011		Until March 2012
23	MF	(Gabon) Alexander N'Doumbou	(France) Orléans	10 August 2011		Until June 2012

== Competitions ==
=== Pre-season and friendlies ===
Last updated: 11 August 2011
Source: soccervista

8 July 2011 Friendly	Vannes OC	0–1	Marseille	Vannes
17:00UTC		Report	Morel 88'	Stadium: Stade de la Rabine; Attendance: 4,289; Referee: Lionel Jaffredo

15 July 2011 Friendly	Marseille	0–1	Montpellier	Martigues
17:00UTC		Report	Belhanda 19'	Stadium: Stade Francis Turcan; Attendance: 3,500; Referee: Hervé Piccirillo

20 July 2011 Friendly	Marseille	1–0	Real Betis	Bayonne
18:30UTC	Valbuena 54'	Report		Stadium: Stade Jean Dauger; Attendance: 3,000; Referee: Saïd Ennjimi

23 July 2011 Friendly	Marseille	1–2	Udinese	Bayonne
16:00UTC	Chris Gadi 50'	Report	Fabbrini 33'; Di Natale 68'	Stadium: Stade Jean Dauger; Referee: Hervé Piccirillo

2 August 2011 Friendly	Manchester United XI	2–8	Marseille	Stade Louis II, Monaco
18:45UTC	Welbeck 37'; Cleverley 39'	Report	15' Nkoulou; 34', 61' J. Ayew; 48', 83' Cheyrou; 60' Diarra; 71', 80' Rémy	Attendance: 10,000; Referee: Laurent Duhamel

=== Trophée des Champions ===
Last updated:11 August 2011
Source:Scoresway

27 July 2011	Marseille	5–4	Lille	Tangier, Morocco
18:45UTC	Morel (yellow card) 8', (goal) 85'; A. Ayew 71', 90' (pen.), 90+5' (pen.); Rémy 87'	Report	Balmont 9'; Chedjou (yellow card) 40' (yellow-red card) 90'; Hazard 57'; Sow 72'; Baša 90'; Pedretti (yellow card) 90'	Stadium: Stade de Tanger; Referee: Bouchaib El Ahrach

=== Ligue 1 ===
==== League table ====
Pos	Team	Pld	W	D	L	GF	GA	GD	Pts	Qualification or relegation
8	Toulouse	38	15	11	12	37	34	+3	56	
9	Evian	38	13	11	14	54	55	−1	50	
10	Marseille	38	12	12	14	45	41	+4	48	Qualification to Europa League third qualifying round (Note: Marseille, as winners of the 2011–12 Coupe de la Ligue, qualified for the third qualifying round of 2012–13 UEFA Europa League.)
11	Nancy	38	11	12	15	38	48	−10	45	
12	Valenciennes	38	12	7	19	40	50	−10	43	

Source: Ligue 1
Rules for classification: 1) points; 2) goal difference; 3) number of goals scored.

==== Results summary ====
Overall								Home						Away					
Pld	W	D	L	GF	GA	GD	Pts	W	D	L	GF	GA	GD	W	D	L	GF	GA	GD
38	12	12	14	45	41	+4	48	8	7	4	26	15	+11	4	5	10	19	26	−7

Source: soccerway.com

==== Results by round ====
Round	1	2	3	4	5	6	7	8	9	10	11	12	13	14	15	16	17	18	19	20	21	22	23	24	25	26	27	28	29	30	31	32	33	34	35	36	37	38
Ground	H	A	H	A	H	A	H	A	H	A	H	A	H	A	H	A	H	A	H	A	H	A	H	A	H	A	H	A	H	A	H	H	A	A	H	A	H	A
Result	D	D	D	L	L	L	W	D	D	D	W	W	W	L	W	W	D	W	W	W	W	D	L	D	L	L	L	L	D	L	L	D	L	L	W	D	W	L
Position	8	9	12	16	17	20	15	13	13	15	12	9	8	10	9	7	8	8	6	6	5	5	7	5	8	8	8	9	9	9	9	10	10	11	10	10	10	10

Source: Fixtures and Results
A = Away; H = Home; W = Win; D = Draw; L = Loss

==== Matches ====
Last updated: 15 August 2011
Source: Olympique de Marseille
Note: Ligue 1 fixtures not posted due to copyright

6 August 2011 1	Marseille	2–2	Sochaux	Marseille
19:00UTC	Mbia (yellow card) 16'; González 38'; Rémy 74'	Report	Corchia (yellow card) 20'; Martin (yellow card) 31', (goal) 58'; Nogueira 70'; Peybernes (yellow card) 90+1'	Stadium: Stade Vélodrome; Attendance: 41,102; Referee: Armando Castro

14 August 2011 2	Auxerre	2–2	Marseille	Auxerre
15:00UTC	Grichting (yellow card) 26'; Traoré (yellow card) 28', (goal) 46'; Oliech (yellow card) 32'; N'Dinga (yellow card) 71'; Contout 81'; Dudka (yellow card) 83'	Report	Rémy 3'; Morel (yellow card) 20'; A. Ayew 43'; Valbuena (yellow card) 53'	Stadium: Stade de l'Abbé-Deschamps; Attendance: 19,342; Referee: Lionel Jaffredo

21 August 2011 3	Marseille	0–0	Saint-Étienne	Marseille
18:00UTC	Azpilicueta (yellow card) 22'	Report	Mignot (yellow card) 54' (red card) 85'; Clément (yellow card) 62'; Marchal (yellow card) 62'; Lemoine (yellow card) 74'	Stadium: Stade Vélodrome; Attendance: 41,493; Referee: Phillippe Kalt

28 August 2011 4	Lille	3–2	Marseille	Villeneuve-d'Ascq
20:00UTC	Sow 15', 75' (pen.); Mavuba (yellow card) 31'; Chedjou 66'; Gueye (yellow card) 79'	Report	A. Ayew (yellow card) 35'; Valbuena 57', 63', (yellow card) 63'; Fanni (yellow card) 74'; J. Ayew (yellow card) 90+2'	Stadium: Stadium Nord Lille Métropole; Attendance: 17,921; Referee: Clément Turpin

28 August 2011 5	Marseille	0–1	Stade Rennais	Marseille
20:00UTC	Azpilicueta (yellow card) 19'; Diawara (yellow card) 32'	Report	Mangane (yellow card) 36'; Féret (yellow card) 43'; Pajot (yellow card) 50'; Théophile-Catherine (yellow card) 73'; Kembo Ekoko 76'	Stadium: Stade Vélodrome; Attendance: 40,628; Referee: Ruddy Buquet

18 September 2011 6	Lyon	2–0	Marseille	Lyon
20:00UTC	Gomis 17'; Bastos 29'	Report	Diarra (yellow card) 26'; González (yellow card) 63'; Amalfitano (yellow card) 75'	Stadium: Stade de Gerland; Attendance: 38,010; Referee: Laurent Duhamel

21 September 2011 7	Marseille	2–0	Evian	Marseille
18:00UTC	Rémy 25', 74', (yellow card) 80'; Amalfitano (yellow card) 37'; Diarra (yellow card) 81'	Report	Rippert (yellow card) 24' (red card) 43'; Govou (yellow card) 53'; Sorlin (yellow card) 69'; Barbosa (yellow card) 76'; Cambon (yellow card) 90+1'	Stadium: Stade Vélodrome; Attendance: 39,357; Referee: Bartolomeu Varela

24 September 2011 8	Valenciennes	1–1	Marseille	Valenciennes
18:00UTC	Ducourtioux (yellow card) 14'; Bong (yellow card) 24'; Saez 90+2'	Report	Diawara 16'; Valbuena (yellow card) 30'; Fanni (red card) 45+4'; Azpilicueta (yellow card) 75'; Mandanda (yellow card) 85'; Nkoulou (yellow card) 90+1'	Stadium: Stade du Hainaut; Attendance: 21,642; Referee: Nicolas Rainville

2 October 2011 9	Marseille	1–1	Brest	Marseille
17:00UTC	A. Ayew 19'; Diarra (yellow card) 34'	Report	Poyet 5', (yellow card) 35'	Stadium: Stade Vélodrome; Attendance: 39,598; Referee: Tony Chapron

15 October 2011 10	Toulouse	0–0	Marseille	Toulouse
19:00UTC	Capoue (yellow card) 13' (yellow-red card) 90+1'; M'Bengue (yellow card) 68'; Braaten (yellow card) 72'	Report	Cheyrou (yellow card) 32'; Kaboré (yellow card) 53' (yellow-red card) 58'; A. Ayew (yellow card) 77'; Gignac (yellow card) 89'	Stadium: Stadium Municipal; Attendance: 30,082; Referee: Antony Gautier

22 October 2011 11	Marseille	2–0	Ajaccio	Marseille
19:00UTC	A. Ayew 30', 50'; Diarra (yellow card) 70'; Amalfitano (yellow card) 90+3'	Report	Maire (yellow card) 51'; Socrier (yellow card) 90+2'	Stadium: Stade Vélodrome; Attendance: 39,786; Referee: Stéphane Lannoy

29 October 2011 12	Dijon	2–3	Marseille	Dijon
19:00UTC	Marcq (yellow card) 11'; Guerbert (yellow card) 39'; Jovial 46'; Corgnet 63'	Report	Rémy 1'; Cheyrou 12', (yellow card) 41'; Amalfitano (yellow card) 31'; Morel (yellow card) 60'; Diarra 82'	Stadium: Stade Gaston Gérard; Attendance: 15,081; Referee: Philippe Malige

6 November 2011 13	Marseille	2–0	Nice	Marseille
17:00UTC	Gignac (yellow card) 22'; J. Ayew 72'; Rémy 90+5' (pen.)	Report	Coulibaly (yellow card) 27'; Diakité (yellow card) 55'; Abriel (yellow card) 59'; Clerc (yellow card) 87'	Stadium: Stade Vélodrome; Attendance: 39,716; Referee: Alexandre Castro

19 November 2011 14	Montpellier	1–0	Marseille	Montpellier
21:00UTC	Saihi (yellow card) 14'; Stambouli (yellow card) 40'; Marveaux (yellow card) 53'; Diawara 62' (o.g.)	Report	Diawara (yellow card) 26'; A. Ayew (yellow card) 61'	Stadium: Stade de la Mosson; Attendance: 26,241; Referee: Tony Chapron

27 November 2011 15	Marseille	3–0	Paris Saint-Germain	Marseille
21:00UTC	Rémy 9'; Mbia (yellow card) 13'; J. Ayew (yellow card) 57'; Amalfitano (yellow card) 63', (goal) 65'; A. Ayew 84'	Report	Armand (yellow card) 45+1'; Sakho (yellow card) 57'	Stadium: Stade Vélodrome; Attendance: 41,512; Referee: Lionel Jaffredo

2 December 2011 16	Caen	1–2	Marseille	Caen
20:00UTC	Proment (yellow card) 12'; Frau 23' (pen.); Heurtaux (yellow card) 55'	Report	A. Ayew 21', (yellow card) 61'; Mbia (yellow card) 25'; J. Ayew 52'	Stadium: Stade Michel d'Ornano; Attendance: 20,470; Referee: Jean Cailleux

10 December 2011 17	Marseille	0–0	Bordeaux	Marseille
20:00	Valbuena (yellow card) 37'; Cheyrou (yellow card) 47'; Azpilicueta (yellow card) 83'	Summary	Henrique (yellow card) 27'; Plašil (yellow card) 43'; Sané (yellow card) 90+3'	Stadium: Stade Vélodrome; Attendance: 40,446; Referee: Herve Piccirillo

17 December 2011 18	Marseille	2–1	Lorient	Marseille
19:00	Nkoulou (yellow card) 18'; Valbuena 84'; Cheyrou 90+4'	Summary	Romao (yellow card) 19' (yellow-red card) 90+3'; Koné (red card) 33'; Audard (yellow card) 72'; Emeghara 77', (yellow card) 85'	Stadium: Stade Vélodrome; Attendance: 40,080; Referee: Nicolas Rainville

20 December 2011 19	Nancy	1–3	Marseille	Tomblaine
21:00	Lemaître 37'; Niculae (yellow card) 61'; Bakar (yellow card) 68'; Loties (yellow card) 70'	Summary	Mbia (yellow card) 7', (goal) 41'; Valbuena 19'; Amalfitano (yellow card) 53'; González 90+1'	Stadium: Stade Marcel Picot; Attendance: 19,304; Referee: Stéphane Lannoy

15 January 2012 20	Marseille	2–0	Lille	Marseille
21:00	Morel (yellow card) 27'; Rémy 62', 83'; Valbuena (yellow card) 72'; Diarra (yellow card) 81'	Summary		Stadium: Stade Vélodrome; Attendance: 41,279; Referee: Ruddy Buquet

29 January 2012 21	Rennes	1–2	Marseille	Rennes
21:00	Doumbia 15', (yellow card) 59'; Montaño (yellow card) 51'; Apam (yellow card) 84'	Summary	Apam 45' (o.g.); Diarra (yellow card) 68'; Cheyrou 77'	Stadium: Stade de la Route de Lorient; Attendance: 28,802; Referee: Alexandre Castro

5 February 2012 22	Marseille	2–2	Lyon	Marseille
21:00	Diawara (yellow card) 11'; Cheyrou 16'; Brandão 34'	Summary	Gomis 36'; Koné (yellow card) 39'; Diawara 45' (o.g.); Umtiti (yellow card) 65'; Briand (yellow card) 86'	Stadium: Stade Vélodrome; Attendance: 41,474; Referee: Antony Gautier

6 March 2012 23	Evian	2–0	Marseille	Annecy
18:30	Leroy 15', 16'; Wass (yellow card) 75'	Summary	Nkoulou (yellow card) 50'	Stadium: Parc des Sports; Attendance: 14,920; Referee: Philippe Kalt

18 February 2012 24	Marseille	1–1	Valenciennes	Marseille
21:00	Diarra 16'; Nkoulou (yellow card) 66'	Summary	Schmitz (yellow card) 30'; Gil 51'; Sánchez (yellow card) 65'; Saez (yellow card) 85'	Stadium: Stade Vélodrome; Attendance: 41,055; Referee: Said Ennjimi

26 February 2012 25	Brest	1–0	Marseille	Brest
17:00	Baysse 17'; Lesoimier (yellow card) 60'	Summary	Kaboré (yellow card) 53'; Azpilicueta (yellow card) 79'	Stadium: Stade Francis-Le Blé; Attendance: 15,096; Referee: Ruddy Buquet

3 March 2012 26	Marseille	0–1	Toulouse	Marseille
19:00	Mandanda (yellow card) 56'	Summary	Capoue (yellow card) 15'; Tabanou (yellow card) 25'; Regattin (yellow card) 56'; Abdennour 66'	Stadium: Stade Vélodrome; Attendance: 40,189; Referee: Lionel Jaffredo

9 March 2012 27	Ajaccio	1–0	Marseille	Ajaccio
20:00	Mostefa (yellow card) 66'; Cavalli (yellow card) 71'; Bouhours (yellow card) 71'; André 89'; Lippini (yellow card) 90+2'; Ochoa (yellow card) 90+3'	Summary	Amalfitano (yellow card) 45'; Valbuena (yellow card) 90+2'	Stadium: Stade François Coty; Attendance: 7,830; Referee: Laurent Duhamel

17 March 2012 28	Marseille	1–2	Dijon	Marseille
19:00	Mbia (yellow card) 6'; Rémy 12' (pen.); Amalfitano (yellow card) 29'; Nkoulou (red card) 78'	Summary	Sankhare (yellow card) 15', (goal) 24'; Kumordzi (yellow card) 42'; Kakuta 79' (pen.)	Stadium: Stade Vélodrome; Attendance: 40,445; Referee: Nicolas Rainville

24 March 2012 29	Nice	1–1	Marseille	Nice
19:00	Civelli (yellow card) 23'; Digard (yellow card) 75'; Monzón 76' (pen.); Grandin (yellow card) 84'	Summary	Kaboré (yellow card) 22' (yellow-red card) 45+2'; A. Ayew 56'; Brandão (yellow card) 75'; Cheyrou (yellow card) 78'	Stadium: Stade Municipal du Ray; Attendance: 11,727; Referee: Saïd Ennjimi

8 April 2012 30	Paris Saint-Germain	2–1	Marseille	Paris
20:00	Ménez 6'; Sissoko (yellow card) 11' (yellow-red card) 85'; Alex 61'; Biševac (yellow card) 84'	Report	Valbuena (yellow card) 12'; A. Ayew 60'; Brandão (yellow card) 84'	Stadium: Parc des Princes; Attendance: 46,252; Referee: Antony Gautier

11 April 2012 31	Marseille	1–3	Montpellier	Marseille
17:00	Traoré (yellow card) 6'; Diarra (yellow card) 29'; Mbia 33'; Cheyrou (yellow card) 50'; A. Ayew (yellow card) 77'	Report	Belhanda 7' (pen.), 71'; Saihi (yellow card) 48'; Giroud 49'	Stadium: Stade Vélodrome; Attendance: 41,519; Referee: Clement Turpin

18 April 2012 32	Marseille	1–1	Caen	Marseille
17:30	Rémy 27' (pen.); Kaboré (yellow card) 90+1'	Report	Bulot 11'; Proment (yellow card) 38'; Vandam (yellow card) 52'	Stadium: Stade Vélodrome; Attendance: 39,261; Referee: Phillippe Kalt

21 April 2012 33	Bordeaux	2–1	Marseille	Bordeaux
20:00	Jussiê 1', 29' (yellow card) 64'; Sané (yellow card) 36'; Gouffran (yellow card) 81'	Report	Ayew (yellow card) 36'; Gignac (yellow card) 47'; Ayew 56'; Brandão (yellow card) 88'	Stadium: Stade Jacques Chaban-Delmas; Attendance: 31,440; Referee: Tony Chapron

27 April 2012 34	Lorient	2–1	Marseille	Lorient
21:00	Mvuemba 41' (pen.); Le Lan (yellow card) 45'; Monnet-Paquet 53'	Report	Ayew (yellow card) 45'; Amalfitano (yellow card) 67'; Nkoulou (yellow card) 69'; Valbuena 78'	Stadium: Stade du Moustoir; Attendance: 15,945; Referee: Phillippe Malige

2 May 2012 35	Marseille	1–0	Nancy	Marseille
19:00	Rémy 31'	Report	André Luiz (yellow card) 57'; Sami (red card) 90+4'	Stadium: Stade Vélodrome; Attendance: 39,430; Referee: Bartolomeu Varela

7 May 2012 36	Saint-Étienne	0–0	Marseille	Saint-Étienne
19:00		Report		Stadium: Stade Geoffroy-Guichard; Attendance: 22,422; Referee: Laurent Duhamel

12 May 2012 37	Marseille	3–0	Auxerre	Marseille
20:00	Fanni 33'; Azpilicueta 54'; Gignac 90'	Report		Stadium: Stade Vélodrome; Attendance: 40,087; Referee: Lionel Jaffredo

20 May 2012 38	Sochaux	1–0	Marseille	Montbéliard
20:00	Boudebouz 56'	Report	Mbia (red card) 85'	Stadium: Stade Auguste-Bonal; Attendance: 18,636; Referee: Tony Chapron

=== Coupe de France ===
7 January 2012 Round of 64	Red Star	0–5	Marseille	Saint Denis
20:45 GMT		Report	J. Ayew 43', 90+1'; Valbuena 64'; A. Ayew 82'; Cheyrou 87'	Stadium: Stade de France; Attendance: 50,892; Referee: Saïd Ennjimi

22 January 2012 Round of 32	Marseille	3–1	Le Havre	Marseille
20:45 GMT	Brandão 64'; Amalfitano 104'; Rémy 120+1'	Report	Mendes 6'	Stadium: Stade Vélodrome; Attendance: 12,999; Referee: Lionel Jaffredo

15 February 2012 Round of 16	Bourg-Péronnas	1–3	Marseille	Saint-Étienne
17:00 GMT	Diaby 78'; Goyon (yellow card) 86'	Report	Brandão 28', 45+1'; J. Ayew 54'	Stadium: Stade Geoffroy-Guichard; Attendance: 8,837; Referee: Philippe Malige

20 March 2012 Quarter-finals	Quevilly	3–2 (a.e.t.)	Marseille	Caen
19:30 GMT	Valéro 6'; Vanoukia (yellow card) 61'; Beaugrard (yellow card) 90'; Ayina 111', 118'	Report	Diawara (yellow card) 63'; Rémy 85', 113', (yellow card) 90'	Stadium: Stade Michel d'Ornano; Referee: Jean Cailleux

=== Coupe de la Ligue ===
25 October 2011 Round of 16	Marseille	4–0	Lens	Marseille
20:45	Gignac 14'; J. Ayew (yellow card) 35', (goal) 68'; Nkoulou (yellow card) 57'; Rémy 82', 90'		Dermont (yellow card) 65'; Baal (yellow card) 81'	Stadium: Stade Vélodrome; Attendance: 17,972; Referee: Wilfried Bien

10 January 2012 Quarter-finals	Caen	0–3	Marseille	Caen
20:45	Nabab (yellow card) 68'	Report	Valbuena 7', 52'; Rémy 21'; Mbia (yellow card) 69'; Nkoulou (yellow card) 69'	Stadium: Stade Michel d'Ornano; Attendance: 15,674; Referee: Antony Gautier

1 February 2012 Semi-finals	Marseille	2–1	Nice	Marseille
20:50	Rémy 16'; Brandão (yellow card) 45+1', (goal) 57'; Valbuena (yellow card) 49' (yellow-red card) 64'	Report	Mounier 44'; Dja Djedje (red card) 83'	Stadium: Stade Vélodrome; Attendance: 12,567; Referee: Clement Turpin

14 April 2012 Final	Lyon	0–1 (a.e.t.)	Marseille	Paris
20:00	Briand (yellow card) 25'; Lovren (yellow card) 55' (yellow-red card) 119'; Gomis (yellow card) 92'; Lacazette (yellow card) 120+1'	Report	Diarra (yellow card) 16'; Mbia (yellow card) 51'; Rémy (yellow card) 93'; Brandão 105'; Nkoulou (yellow card) 119'	Stadium: Stade de France; Attendance: 78,877; Referee: Stephane Lannoy

=== UEFA Champions League ===
==== Group stage ====
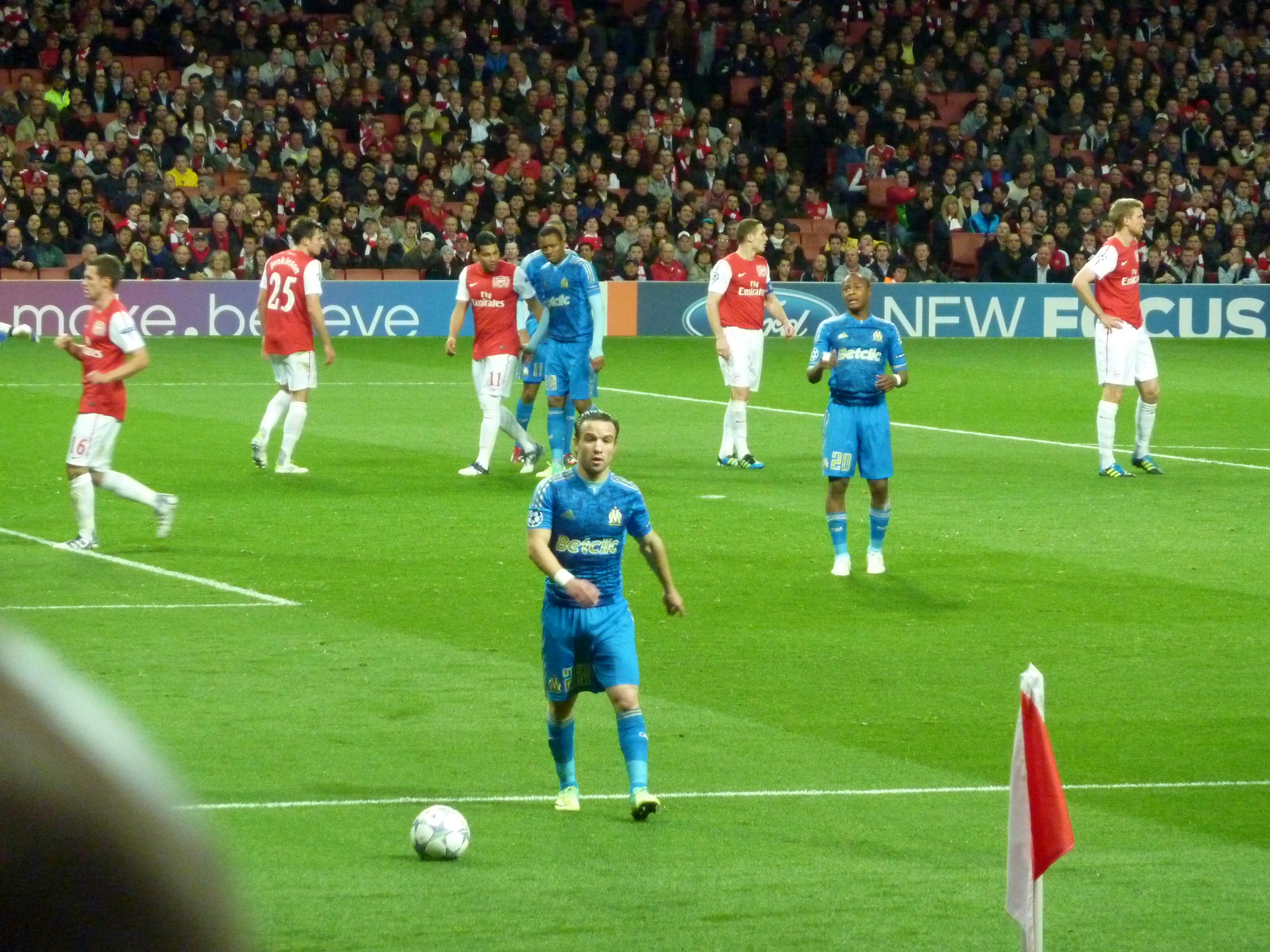
Olympique de Marseille playing against Arsenal.

Pos	Team	Pld	W	D	L	GF	GA	GD	Pts	Qualification
1	(England) Arsenal	6	3	2	1	7	6	+1	11	Advance to knockout phase
2	(France) Marseille	6	3	1	2	7	4	+3	10	Advance to knockout phase
3	(Greece) Olympiacos	6	3	0	3	8	6	+2	9	Transfer to Europa League
4	(Germany) Borussia Dortmund	6	1	1	4	6	12	−6	4	

Source: Soccerway

13 September 2011 1	Olympiacos (Greece)	0–1	(France) Marseille	Piraeus, Greece
20:45 CEST	Mirallas (yellow card) 61'; Papadopoulos (yellow card) 90'	Report	González 51'; Morel (yellow card) 71'; Amalfitano (yellow card) 86'; J. Ayew (yellow card) 90'	Stadium: Karaiskakis Stadium; Attendance: 30,040; Referee: Pedro Proença (Portugal)

28 September 2011 2	Marseille (France)	3–0	(Germany) Borussia Dortmund	Marseille, France
20:45 CEST	A. Ayew 20', 69' (pen.); Morel (yellow card) 60'; Rémy 62'; J. Ayew (yellow card) 79' (yellow-red card) 90+3'	Report	Hummels (yellow card) 58'	Stadium: Stade Vélodrome; Attendance: 26,142; Referee: Jonas Eriksson (Sweden)

19 October 2011 3	Marseille (France)	0–1	(England) Arsenal	Marseille, France
20:45 CEST	A. Ayew (yellow card) 14'; Diawara (yellow card) 49'; Gignac (yellow card) 83'	Report	Song (yellow card) 4'; Santos (yellow card) 16'; Djourou (yellow card) 74'; Ramsey 90+2'	Stadium: Stade Vélodrome; Attendance: 33,258; Referee: Damir Skomina (Slovenia)

1 November 2011 4	Arsenal (England)	0–0	(France) Marseille	London, England
20:45 GMT	Rosický (yellow card) 85'	Report	Diarra (yellow card) 40'	Stadium: Emirates Stadium; Attendance: 59,961; Referee: Paolo Tagliavento (Italy)

23 November 2011 5	Marseille (France)	0–1	(Greece) Olympiacos	Marseille, France
20:45 GMT	Rémy (yellow card) 34'	Report	Torosidis (yellow card) 27'; Fetfatzidis 82'	Stadium: Stade Vélodrome; Attendance: 25,392; Referee: Nicola Rizzoli (Italy)

6 December 2011 6	Borussia Dortmund (Germany)	2–3	(France) Marseille	Dortmund, Germany
20:45 GMT	Błaszczykowski 23'; Hummels 32' (pen.); Santana (yellow card) 68'	Report	Mbia (yellow card) 29'; Amalfitano (yellow card) 44'; Rémy 45+4'; A. Ayew (yellow card) 73', (goal) 85'; Diarra (yellow card) 75'; Valbuena (yellow card) 82', (goal) 87'	Stadium: Signal Iduna Park; Attendance: 65,000; Referee: Howard Webb (England)

==== Knockout phase ====
===== Round of 16 =====
22 February 2012 First leg	Marseille (France)	1–0	(Italy) Internazionale	Marseille, France
20:45	Diawara (yellow card) 74'; A. Ayew 90+3'	Report	Stanković (yellow card) 58'; Zárate (yellow card) 60'; Chivu (yellow card) 67'	Stadium: Stade Vélodrome; Attendance: 37,646; Referee: Cüneyt Çakır (Turkey)

13 March 2012 Second leg	Internazionale (Italy)	2–1 (2–2 agg.)	(France) Marseille	Milan, Italy
20:45	Zanetti (yellow card) 24'; Samuel (yellow card) 53'; Milito 75'; Stanković (yellow card) 90'; Pazzini 90+6' (pen.)	Report	Diawara (yellow card) 67'; Brandão 90+2'; Mandanda (yellow card) 68' (yellow-red card) 90+3'	Stadium: San Siro; Attendance: 62,632; Referee: Pedro Proença (Portugal)

===== Quarter-finals =====
28 March 2012 First leg	Marseille (France)	0–2	(Germany) Bayern Munich	Marseille, France
20:45	Diarra (yellow card) 34'; Mbia (yellow card) 64'	Report	Kroos (yellow card) 32'; Lahm (yellow card) 32'; Luiz Gustavo (yellow card) 36'; Gómez 44'; Robben 69'; Schweinsteiger (yellow card) 82'; Alaba (yellow card) 89'	Stadium: Stade Vélodrome; Attendance: 31,683; Referee: Carlos Velasco Carballo (Spain)

3 April 2012 Second leg	Bayern Munich (Germany)	2–0 (4–0 agg.)	(France) Marseille	Munich, Germany
20:45	Olić 13', 37'; Alaba (yellow card) 64'	Report	Mbia (yellow card) 37'	Stadium: Allianz Arena; Attendance: 66,000; Referee: Svein Oddvar Moen (Norway)

== Olympique de Marseille Reserves ==
=== Reserve squad ===
Note: Flags indicate national team as defined under FIFA eligibility rules; some limited exceptions apply. Players may hold more than one non-FIFA nationality.

No.	Pos.	Nation	Player
—	GK	MAR	Samir Kouakbi
—	GK	SLO	Brice Krizman
—	DF	FRA	Fabien Barrillon
—	DF	ARM	Varanth Bezdikian
—	DF	FRA	Sébastien Bregand
—	DF	ARG	Sébastien Fischetti
—	DF	CPV	Raphaël Lopes
—	DF	TOG	Senah Mango
—	DF	GLP	Thierry Rodríguez
—	MF	FRA	Landing Bodian
—	MF	FRA	Olivier Cano
—	MF	ARG	Gaëtan D'Acunto
—	MF	BIH	Mathias Guedj

No.	Pos.	Nation	Player
—	MF	ALG	Cédric Hachani
—	MF	SEN	Daouda Haidari
—	MF	CRO	Niko Maričić
—	MF	FRA	Anthony Marin
—	MF	IRI	Ahmad Nouri
—	MF	TUN	Driss Sahraoui
—	FW	GHA	Jordan Ayew
—	FW	FRA	Thierry Batret
—	FW	CPV	Nicolas Crus
—	FW	CPV	Riad Dob
—	FW	FRA	Chris Gadi
—	FW	FRA	Noël Sciortino
—	FW	GEO	Gurami Enukidze

== See also ==
- OM.net
