= Joinel =

Joinel is a surname. Notable people with the surname include:

- Alban Joinel (born 1979), French footballer
- Jean-Luc Joinel (born 1953), French rugby union player
