= Denis Renaud =

French football manager (born 1974)

Personal information
- Date of birth: 20 September 1974 (age 52)
- Place of birth: Nantes, France
- Position: Defender

Youth career
- –1991: Nantes

Senior career*
Years	Team	Apps	(Gls)
1991–1992	Cholet		
1992–1994	Vertou		

Managerial career
- 1996–2001: La Haye-Fouassière
- 2001–2002: Vertou
- 2002–2014: Carquefou
- 2015: Paris
- 2016–2018: Chamois Niortais
- * Club domestic league appearances and goals

Denis Renaud (born 20 September 1974) is a French football manager. Following a modest playing career, he took up his first managerial position at the age of 22. After a brief spell at Vertou, Renaud spent 12 seasons at Carquefou, leading the team to three promotions during his reign. His first taste of professional football management came in 2015 when he was appointed manager of Paris.

== Playing career ==
Renaud came through the youth system at his hometown club, Nantes, but never broke into the senior team. After playing several games for the reserve side during the 1990–91 season, he transferred to Championnat de France Amateur (CFA) club Cholet in the summer of 1991. He stayed there for just one season before joining Vertou, where he played for two seasons before retiring from playing in 1994 to take up studies in physical education.

== Managerial career ==
After almost becoming a teacher, Renaud began his managerial career at the age of 22 when he joined French lower-league club La Haye-Fouassière. In 2001, he returned to his former club Vertou as manager, but left after one season to join Carquefou. While at Carquefou he guided the team to promotion to the CFA twice, in 2004 and again in 2009. In 2008 the team reached the quarter-finals of the Coupe de France, beating established sides including Marseille before being knocked out by Paris Saint-Germain. A highly successful 2011–12 season in which the team amassed 105 points saw the club promoted to the Championnat National, the third tier of French football, for the first time in their history. Carquefou spent two seasons in the division before being demoted to the regional leagues after experiencing financial difficulties, signalling the end of Renaud's reign.

On 5 June 2015, Renaud was appointed manager of newly promoted Ligue 2 side Paris FC, replacing Christophe Taine. Under his guidance, the team won only one of their first sixteen games of the season, a 3–0 home victory against Le Havre. On 28 November 2015, Renaud was dismissed from his post and replaced by Jean-Luc Vasseur. After spending several months without a job, it was announced on 9 May 2016 that Renaud would take up the position of head coach at Chamois Niortais following the departure of Régis Brouard.
