= Charles Elyan Costes =

French footballer (born 2002)

Personal information
- Date of birth: 16 September 2002 (age 24)
- Place of birth: France
- Height: 1.78 m (5 ft 10 in)
- Position: Winger

Team information
- Current team: FC 93
- Number: 14

Senior career*
Years	Team	Apps	(Gls)
2019–2023	Dijon II	11	(0)
2021	Dijon	22	(2)
2023–	FC 93	4	(1)
- * Club domestic league appearances and goals as of 16 September 2023

Charles Elyan Costes (born 16 September 2002) is a French professional footballer who plays as a winger for Championnat National 1 club FC 93.

== Career ==
On 5 February 2019, Costes signed with Dijon. He made his professional debut with Dijon in a 1–0 Ligue 1 win over Saint-Étienne on 23 May 2021.
