= Loïc Guillon =

French footballer (born 1982)

Personal information
- Full name: Loïc Guillon
- Date of birth: 11 January 1982 (age 44)
- Place of birth: Limoges, France
- Height: 1.86 m (6 ft 1 in)
- Position: Defender

Team information
- Current team: Vertou

Senior career*
Years	Team	Apps	(Gls)
2001–2009	Nantes	139	(3)
2009–2011	Vannes	34	(0)
2011–2014	Carquefou	80	(4)
2014–2015	Angers	15	(0)
2015–2016	Luçon	29	(2)
2016–	Vertou	45	(1)
- * Club domestic league appearances and goals as of 21:32, 8 August 2018 (UTC)

Loïc Guillon (born 11 January 1982) is a French football defender, currently playing for French team Luçon.

== Career ==
Guillon began his career with FC Nantes and joined Vannes OC in July 2009.
