= Romain Pastorelli =

French professional footballer (born 1983)

Personal information
- Date of birth: March 25, 1983 (age 43)
- Place of birth: Cagnes-sur-Mer, France
- Height: 1.80 m (5 ft 11 in)
- Position: Striker

Team information
- Current team: AS Furiani-Agliani
- Number: 18

Youth career
- Nice
- Cannes

Senior career*
Years	Team	Apps	(Gls)
2002–2003	Saint-Raphaël	7	(1)
2003–2004	Vence		
2004–2006	Gazélec Ajaccio	43	(5)
2006–2008	Fréjus	52	(25)
2008–2009	Cassis Carnoux	35	(10)
2009–2010	Hyères	37	(10)
2010–2014	CA Bastia	112	(65)
2014–2018	AS Furiani-Agliani	51	(26)
2018–2021	Gallia Club Lucciana	51	(26)
- * Club domestic league appearances and goals as of 12:58, 17 November 2017 (UTC)

Romain Pastorelli (born 25 March 1983 in Cagnes-sur-Mer) is a French professional footballer who currently plays for AS Furiani-Agliani in Championnat National 1. He previously played professionally for CA Bastia in Ligue 2

== Club career ==
Pastorelli started his career in the French lower leagues, mainly playing in the South of France. In 2013, he gained promotion to the Ligue 2 with CA Bastia, while becoming the top scorer in the league.

He then made his professional debut in August 2013, in an away defeat against Lens. His first professional goal came two games later, on 16 August 2013, when he converted a penalty in the 1–1 draw at FC Istres.

Pastorelli moved to Corsican amateur side AS Furiani-Agliani on 8 November 2014.
