= Emmanuel Corrèze =

French footballer (born 1982)

Personal information
- Date of birth: 9 March 1982 (age 44)
- Place of birth: Arles, France
- Height: 1.78 m (5 ft 10 in)
- Position: Midfielder

Senior career*
| Years | Team | Apps | (Gls) |
| 1999–2003 | Marseille B | 40 | (6) |
| 2003–2004 | Gazélec Ajaccio | 14 | (1) |
| 2004 | Germinal Beerschot | 1 | (0) |
| 2004–2009 | Arles | 69 | (2) |
| 2009–2011 | Arles-Avignon | 29 | (0) |
| 2011–2014 | Nîmes | 11 | (1) |
- * Club domestic league appearances and goals

Emmanuel Corrèze (born 9 March 1982) is a retired French professional footballer who played as midfielder.
