= Sacha Clémence =

French footballer (born 1988)

Personal information
- Date of birth: 1 June 1988 (age 38)
- Place of birth: Dijon, France
- Height: 1.85 m (6 ft 1 in)
- Position: Forward

Youth career
- Bordeaux

Senior career*
Years	Team	Apps	(Gls)
2010–2011	Carquefou	1	(0)
2011–2012	Vannes	0	(0)
2012–2013	Saint-Colomban Locminé	24	(16)
2013–2014	Carquefou	33	(11)
2014–2015	Angers	28	(5)
2014–2015	Angers B	4	(1)
2015–2016	Creteil	14	(3)
2016–2018	Tours	44	(2)
2018–2019	Dunărea Călărași	7	(0)
2019–2021	US Lège Cap-Ferret	9	(2)
- * Club domestic league appearances and goals as of 11:25, 13 June 2024 (UTC)

Sacha Clémence (born 1 June 1988) is a French professional footballer who plays as a forward.

== Career ==
After making his debut in the French lower divisions, Clémence joined Ligue 2 side Angers SCO in 2014. He made his full professional debut a few weeks later, coming on the pitch in the second half of a 3–2 defeat against Nîmes Olympique in August 2014.
