= Sébastien Le Paih =

French footballer (born 1974)

Personal information
- Date of birth: 4 November 1974 (age 51)
- Place of birth: Nantes, France
- Height: 1.80 m (5 ft 11 in)
- Position: Midfielder

Senior career*
Years	Team	Apps	(Gls)
1991–1998	Nantes (B team)	36	(2)
1995–1998	Nantes	3	(0)
1996–1997	→ Le Mans (loan)	19	(0)
1997–1998	→ Lorient (loan)	7	(0)
1998–2002	Angers SCO	87	(5)
2002–2004	SO Romorantin	48	(2)
2004–2005	Croix-de-Savoie	33	(3)
2005–2012	Carquefou	106	(3)
- * Club domestic league appearances and goals as of 18:44, 27 November 2009 (UTC)

Sébastien Le Paih (born 4 November 1974) was a French professional football player.

He played on the professional level in Ligue 1 for FC Nantes and Ligue 2 for Le Mans Union Club 72, FC Lorient and Angers SCO. At age 33, Le Paih captained amateurs USJA Carquefou to the quarter-finals of the 2007–08 Coupe de France.
