= Gérard Roland (footballer) =

French footballer (born 1981)

Personal information
- Full name: Gérard Georges Sylvain Roland
- Date of birth: April 5, 1981 (age 45)
- Place of birth: Bordeaux, France
- Height: 1.86 m (6 ft 1 in)
- Position: Left back

Team information
- Current team: Marseille B

Youth career
- 1994–1997: Bordeaux

Senior career*
Years	Team	Apps	(Gls)
1997–2001	Bordeaux B	?	(?)
2001–2002	Varzim	8	(0)
2002–2004	Langon-Castets	33	(0)
2004–2008	Beauvais	124	(1)
2008–2010	Bayonne	69	(2)
2010–	Marseille B	24	(2)
- * Club domestic league appearances and goals as of 1 August 2011

Gérard Georges Sylvain Roland (born 5 April 1981) is a French footballer who plays for Olympique de Marseille B as a left defender.

== Football career ==
Roland started his career with local FC Girondins de Bordeaux, but could only appear for the reserves during four seasons. In 2001–02, he had his first taste of top flight football, being sparingly used by Varzim S.C. (114 minutes, only one start) as the club retained its Primeira Liga status in Portugal.

Subsequently, Roland returned to his country, playing two years in the regional leagues with Langon Castets Football Club then signing with AS Beauvais Oise, with which he appeared in the Championnat National in his last two seasons. In 2008, he moved to Aviron Bayonnais FC, in the same level.

On 15 August 2010, Roland signed with Olympique de Marseille, being assigned to its B team.
