= Romain Revelli =

French footballer and manager (born 1977)

Personal information
- Date of birth: 22 August 1977 (age 49)
- Place of birth: Saint-Chamond, France
- Position: Defensive midfielder

Senior career*
Years	Team	Apps	(Gls)
1995–1998	Saint-Étienne B		
1998–2001	Le Puy		

Managerial career
- 2007–2011: Saint-Étienne (youth)
- 2011–2015: Saint-Étienne (assistant)
- 2015–2016: Évian (assistant)
- 2016: Évian
- 2017–2018: Andrézieux
- 2018–2019: Cholet
- 2019–2021: Andrézieux
- 2021–2023: Dunkerque
- 2023–2024: Villefranche
- * Club domestic league appearances and goals

Romain Revelli (born 22 August 1977) is a French professional football manager and former player. As a player, he was a defensive midfielder.

== Playing career ==
A true "child of Les Verts", Revelli began his playing career at Saint-Étienne; he played for the club's B team from 1995 to 1998 before switching over to Le Puy for the three final years of his career. He voluntarily retired from football in 2001, before the age of 25, in order to become a football manager.

== Managerial career ==
After passing through Haute-Loire, Revelli became a youth team coach for Saint-Étienne in 2007. He initially worked as the manager of the under-17 squad, and later coached the under-19s of the club. In 2011, Revelli was called by Christophe Galtier, ASSE manager since 2009, to become his assistant. He subsequently held the position of assistant coach at Saint-Étienne for four years, being on the bench for over 100 Ligue 1 matches. In 2015, Revelli became the assistant manager of Ligue 2 club Évian. The following year, he became head coach, but only until the club's liquidation in 2016.

In 2017, Revelli returned to his home region, becoming the head coach of Andrézieux. He then would go on to coach Cholet from 2018 to 2019 before returning to Andrézieux. In May 2021, he was appointed as head coach by Ligue 2 club Dunkerque, signing a two-year contract. He leave from the club in the end of 2022–23 season. Revelli appointment manager of Championnat National club, Villefranche from 2023–24 season.

== Personal life ==
Romain's brother Christophe was also a footballer. They played together at Saint-Étienne.
