= FC 93 Bobigny-Bagnolet-Gagny =

Football club based in Bobigny, France

FC 93
- Full name: Football Club 93 Bobigny-Bagnolet-Gagny
- Nickname: FC 93 BBG
- Founded: 2013 (as AF Bobigny); 2020 (as FC 93)
- Ground: Auguste Delaune, Bobigny
- Capacity: 406 (seated)
- Chairman: Mahamadou Niakaté
- Manager: Christophe Taine
- League: National 2 Group C
- 2023–24: National 2 Group D, 4th of 14
- Website: https://fc93.fr
Home colours	Away colours

Football Club 93 Bobigny-Bagnolet-Gagny (French pronunciation: [futbol klœb katʁə.vɛ̃.tʁɛz bɔbiɲi baɲɔlɛ ɡaɲi]), sometimes shortened to FC Bobigny-Bagnolet-Gagny and commonly called Football Club 93 or FC 93, is a French football club based in Bobigny in île-de-France's Seine-Saint-Denis department. The club was founded in 2013 as Académie de Football Bobigny by the de-merger of the football section of the multi-sport organisation Athlétic Club de Bobigny. It took its current name in 2020, after merging with local clubs Bagnolet Académie and USM Gagny. As of the 2024–25 season, the club plays in Championnat National 2, the fourth level of French football, having won back-to-back promotion in 2017 and 2018.

The club reached the round of 64 of the 2014–15 Coupe de France, losing 3–0 to Ligue 1 side Evian.

== Notable players ==
- (France) Gady Beyuku (youth)
- (France) Oumar Camara (youth)
- (France) Odsonne Édouard (youth)
- (France) Axel Tape (youth)
