= Alban Joinel =

French footballer (born 1979)

Personal information
- Date of birth: 14 September 1979 (age 47)
- Place of birth: Sarlat-la-Canéda, France
- Height: 1.79 m (5 ft 10 in)
- Position: Goalkeeper

Senior career*
Years	Team	Apps	(Gls)
1998–2002	Brive		
2002–2003	Angoulême		
2003–2005	Châtellerault		
2005–2006	Poitiers		
2006–2008	Carquefou		
2008–2011	Lorient	1	(0)
2011–2014	Carquefou	75	(0)
- * Club domestic league appearances and goals

Alban Joinel (born 14 September 1979) is a French former professional footballer who played as a goalkeeper. During a long playing career, Joinel represented numerous clubs in the French lower league. He also had a spell with Lorient between 2008 and 2011 where he made one appearance in Ligue 1, playing in the 0–1 home defeat against Nice on 8 November 2008.
