= Georges Tournay =

French footballer (born 1960)

Personal information
- Date of birth: 6 October 1960 (age 66)
- Place of birth: Cambrai, France
- Height: 1.74 m (5 ft 9 in)
- Position: Forward

Senior career*
| Years | Team | Apps | (Gls) |
| 1976–1977 | Cambrai | | |
| 1977–1983 | Lens | 18 | (0) |
| 1983–1985 | Abbeville | 55 | (8) |
| 1985–1992 | Louhans-Cuiseaux | 159 | (16) |

Managerial career
- 2001: Lens
- 2012–2013: Boulogne
- * Club domestic league appearances and goals

Georges Tournay (born 6 October 1960) is a French football manager and former player who most recently managed Championnat National side US Boulogne. During his career he played as a forward for Cambrai, Lens, Abbeville and Louhans-Cuiseaux and made over 200 league appearances in total. After retiring in 1992 he became manager of the Lens C team and was then named reserve team coach two years later. Between 1999 and 2005, Tournay was the assistant manager at Lens, and had a four-month spell in charge of the first team between February 2001 and June 2001. He later worked as the head of youth development at the club before returning to the assistant manager post under László Bölöni in January 2011.

Tournay was hired as head coach of Boulogne on 23 June 2012. He was selected ahed of former Neuchâtel Xamax manager François Ciccolini and Carquefou trainer Denis Renaud.
