= Albert Makiadi =

French footballer (born 1997)

Personal information
- Full name: Albert Antoine Alexis Norbert Makiadi
- Date of birth: 11 July 1997 (age 29)
- Place of birth: Bordeaux, France
- Height: 1.74 m (5 ft 9 in)
- Position: Wing-back

Team information
- Current team: Arendal
- Number: 14

Youth career
- 2003–2009: RC Chambery
- 2009–2017: Bordeaux

Senior career*
Years	Team	Apps	(Gls)
2015–2017	Bordeaux II	24	(0)
2017–2019	Ajaccio II	24	(6)
2017	Ajaccio	1	(0)
2019–2023	Kvik Halden	82	(18)
2023–	Arendal	11	(5)

International career^{‡}
2013	France U16	8	(1)
- * Club domestic league appearances and goals as of 1 December 2023 ‡ National team caps and goals as of 04:46, 13 April 2021 (UTC)

Albert Antoine Alexis Norbert Makiadi (born 11 July 1997) is a French professional footballer who plays as a wing-back for Norwegian club Arendal.

== Club career ==
Makiadi signed Ajaccio on 17 July 2017, after developing in the Bordeaux academy. Makiadi made his debut for Ajaccio in a 2–1 Ligue 2 loss to Châteauroux on 3 November 2017.

After a trial at Norwegian club Kvik Halden, Makiadi signed a one-year contract with the club on 1 February 2019.

In August 2023, Makiadi moved to Arendal, on a contract that expires at the end of 2024.

== International career ==
Born in France, Makiadi is of Congolese descent. Makiadi is a youth international for France.
