= AC Arlésien =

Arles
- Full name: Athlétic Club Arlésien
- Nickname: Les Lions (The Lions)
- Founded: 1913; 113 years ago
- Ground: Stade Fernand-Fournier
- Capacity: 2,500
- Head coach: Michel Estevan
- League: Régional 1 Méditerranée
- 2022–23: Unknown

Athlétic Club Arlésien (French pronunciation: [aʁl-aviɲɔ̃]; commonly referred to as Arlésien or simply Arles) is a French association football club originally based in Arles. The club was founded in 1912 as a result of a merger and was formerly known as Athlétic Club Arles, but in 2010, moved to the nearby commune of Avignon and adopted the name of AC Arles-Avignon. Athlétic Club Arlésien last played at a professional capacity in the Championnat de France Amateur, the fourth division in French football; it previously gained four promotions in five seasons to reach Ligue 1 in 2010. They were later relegated after one season.

When the club was named Arles-Avignon, they played their home matches at the Parc des Sports in nearby Avignon. The team was managed by former football player Franck Dumas and captained by defender Sébastien Cantini, who joined the club in 2012 after a five-year stint in Italy. In France, it was commonplace to describe Arles-Avignon as an overachieving club primarily due to succeeding despite limited resources. Arles-Avignon's highest honour was winning its group in the Championnat de France amateur, the fourth level of French football, in 2007. Regionally, the club has won the Division Honneur Sud-Est Ouest three times, and its reserve team are the current defending champions of the Méditerranée Division Honneur Régionale.

Arles-Avignon was known locally as Les Lions (The Lions) and incorporated the nickname into a multitude of club's fixtures, most notably its crest. After merging with Avignon, the club unveiled its new crest on 4 June 2009. The crest combined both elements of each club's predecessors, and inscribed on the crest is Pays d'Arles Grand Avignon, which pays tribute to the inhabitants of the city of Arles and Grand Avignon, the metropolitan area that encompasses the commune of Avignon. In 2010, the club changed its crest again to coincide with its promotion to Ligue 1.

== History ==
Athlétic Club Arles-Avignon was founded on 19 December 1912 under the name Athletic Club Arlésien as a result of a merger between three local clubs: La Pédale Joyeuse, Arles Auto-Vélo, and Arles Sports. The spent its early years playing in the Ligue du Sud-Est. To remain financially sound due to the onset of World War II, Arles merged with two clubs; Club Ouvrier and Sports cheminots with the new club retaining Arles' previous name. After the war, in 1954, the club reached the Championnat de France amateur under the leadership of manager Louis Pons. In 1960, Arles went through another merger, this time with local club Jeunesse Sportive Arlés. The merger was influenced by Honoré Autier, a former football player for FC Sète. In the Arles' ensuing season, the club fell back to the Ligue du Sud-Est, and after four attempts, returned to the Championnat de France amateur in 1965.

In the 1970s, Arles reached the second division of French football and, in its inaugural appearance in the 1970–71 season, finished 13th in its group. The club spent another three seasons in the league before falling to Division 3 in 1974. Arles returned to Division 2 in 1977, but after two seasons, were back in Division 3. In the 1980s, the club fell to Division 4. In 1992, under the tutelage of manager Jean-Louis Sanz, Arles earned promotion to the Championnat National and were inaugural members of the new league. The club played in the league for four seasons before earning promotion to the Championnat de France amateur 2. In 1999, Arles finished first in its group and were, subsequently, promoted to the Championnat de France amateur. The appearance in the fourth division was brief and, in 2002, Arles were back in the fifth division.

In 2005, Arles embarked on a magical run, which concluded with the club earning promotion to Ligue 1. From 2005–2010, the club achieved promotions in four of the five football seasons. In 2005, the club finished third in its group in the CFA 2. However, because the club's that finished ahead of them were reserve teams of professional club, Arles were allowed ascension to the CFA. In the ensuing season, Arles won its group in the CFA and were promoted back to National. After finishing the 2007–08 season mid-table, Arles surprised many by finishing third in the league, thus going up to Ligue 2. Just after earning promotion to Ligue 2, Arles confirmed that the club was leaving the Stade Fernand Fournier to move into the Parc des Sports in nearby Avignon, a bigger and more modern venue. The club, subsequently, changed its name to its current form and adopted a new crest.

The club was initially not allowed to participate in Ligue 2 after the DNCG ruled the club ineligible due to irregularities in the club's financial accounts. However, following an appeal, the DNCG reversed its decision reinstating Arles' Ligue 2 status and also the club's professional status. In the club's return to the second division after over 35 years, Arles-Avignon against stunned French football enthusiasts by finishing third in the league. The club's final position was secured on the final day. Arles-Avignon was among four clubs battling for the final promotion spot and secured the position after a win over Clermont, who was one of the clubs fighting for the final spot.

In the Arles-Avignon's debut in Ligue 1, the club struggled losing its first eight matches. The club's first point in the league came in its ninth attempt in a 0–0 draw in Brest. The following week, Arles-Avignon recorded a surprising 0–0 draw with Lyon and, two weeks later, earned the club's first Ligue 1 win; a 3–2 victory over Caen. Arles-Avignon were relegated from Ligue 1 having won just three matches all season in their maiden campaign in the top flight.

On 10 July 2015, DNCG announced that Arles-Avignon was administratively relegated to Championnat de France Amateur from Ligue 2 for failing to guarantee sufficient capital. It was subsequently dissolved during the season. In recent years, Arles dropped Avignon from their name and left the Parc des Sports ground in the city, moving to the Stade Fernand-Fournier ground. AC Arlésien currently play in the Régional 1 Méditerranée league after gaining promotion from Régional 2 Méditerranée.

== Players ==
=== Notable players ===
Below are the notable former and current players who have represented Arles-Avignon and its predecessors league and international competition since the club's foundation in 1912. To appear in the section below, a player must have either played in at least 80 official matches for the club or represented their country's national team either while playing for Arles-Avignon or after departing the club.

For a complete list of Arles-Avignon players, see: Category:AC Arles-Avignon players.

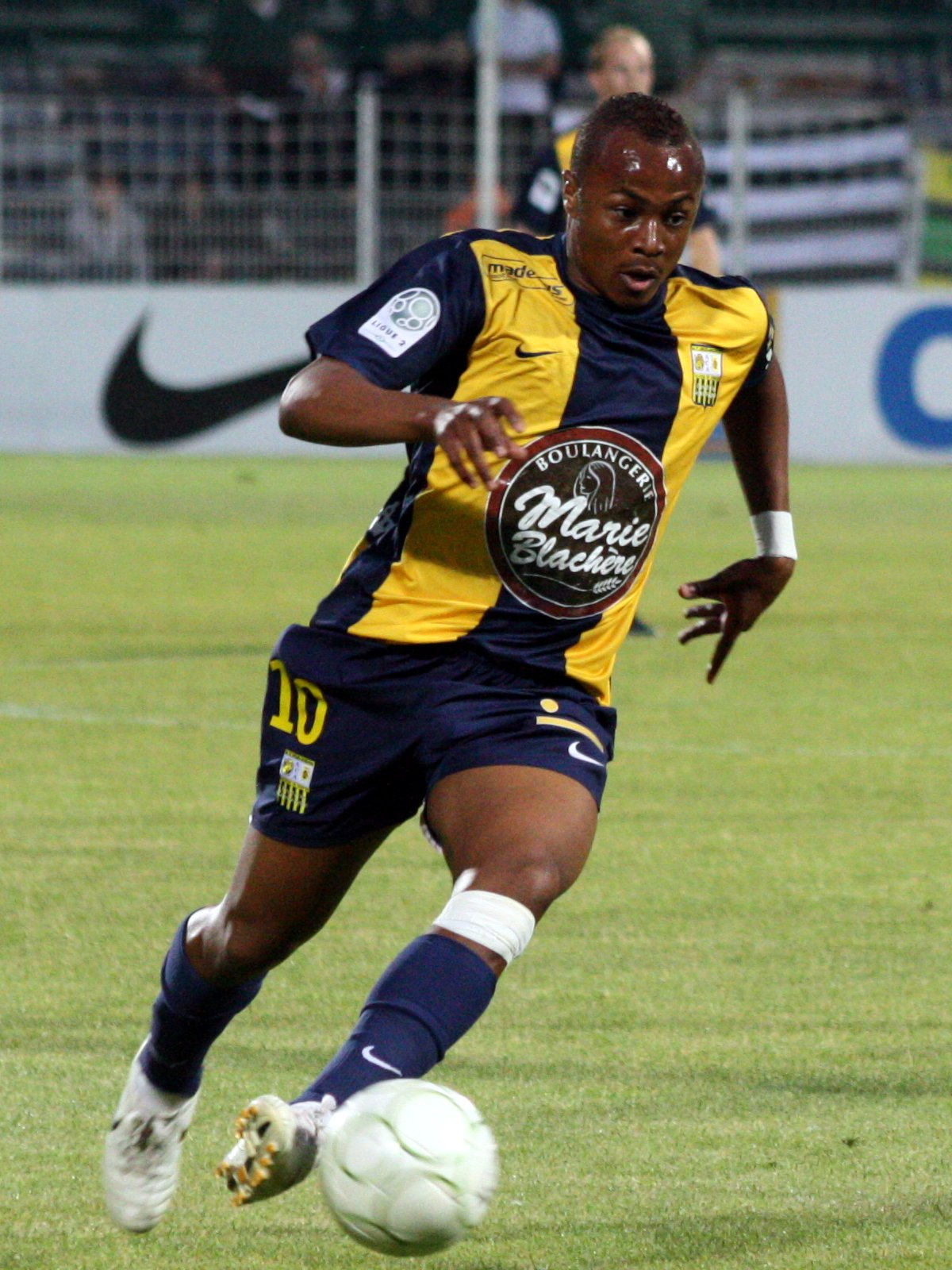
André Ayew helped Arles achieving promotion to the Ligue 1.

- (France) Michel Estevan
- (France) René Exbrayat
- (France) Jean-Charles Cirilli
- (France) Emmanuel Corrèze
- (France) Christian Payan
- (France) Benjamin Psaume
- (France) Vincent Dyduch
- (France) Djibril Cissé
- (France) Gaël Givet
- (France) Rémy Cabella
- (Greece) Angelos Charisteas
- (Greece) Angelos Basinas
- (Algeria) Hamer Bouazza
- (Algeria) Ismaël Bennacer
- (Ghana) André Ayew
- (Guinea) Bobo Baldé
- (Guinea) Kaba Diawara
- (Guinea) Naby Yattara
- (Senegal) Deme N'Diaye
- (Senegal) Mamadou Niang
- (Cameroon) Allan Nyom

== Management and staff ==
- President: Marcel Salerno
- Manager:
- Assistant manager:

== Honours ==
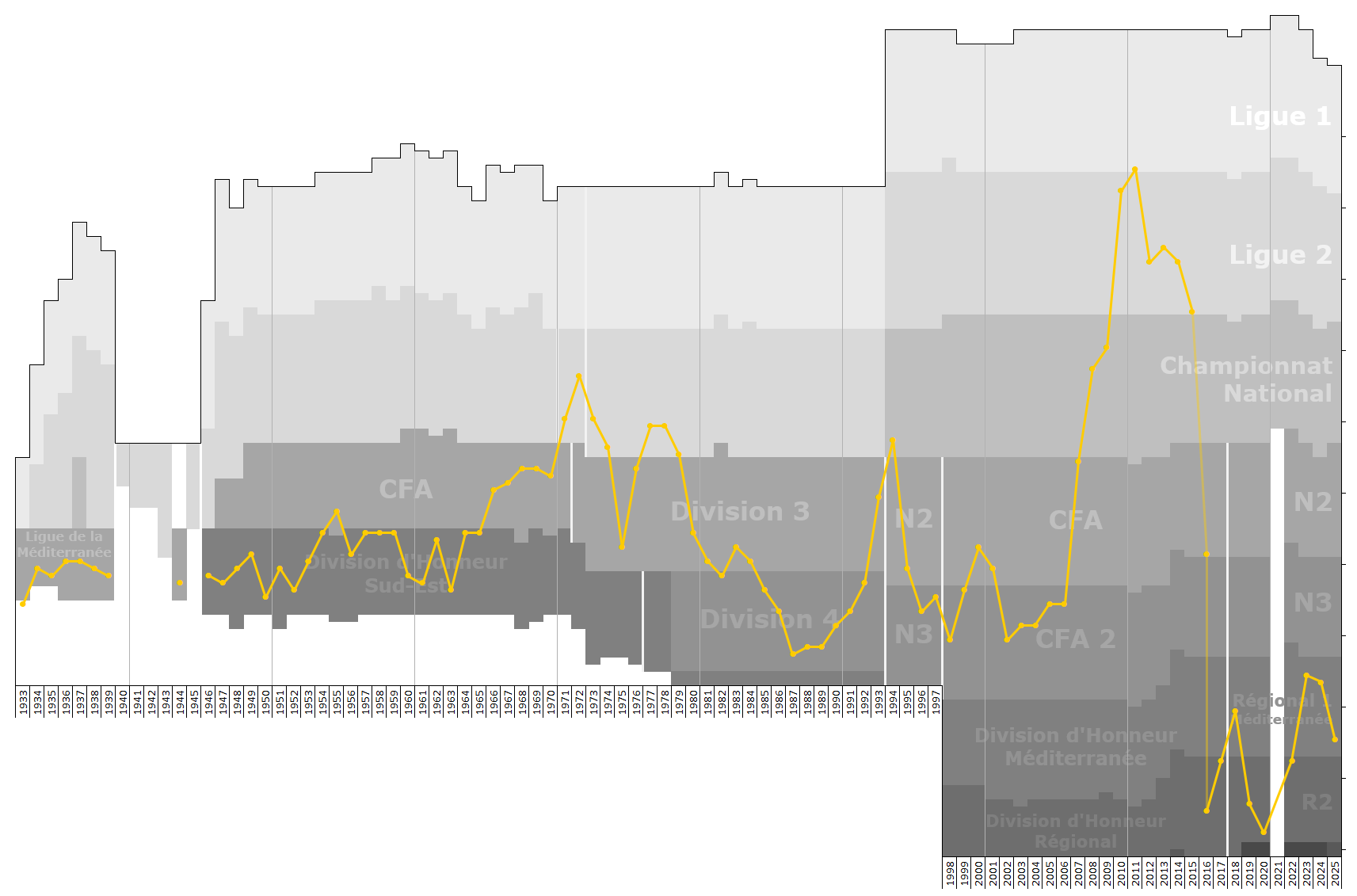
Historical league performance chart of AC Arlésien

- Championnat de France amateur
  - Winners (1): 2007 (Group B)
- Championnat de France amateur 2
  - Winners (1); 1999 (Group D)
- Division Honneur Sud-Est Ouest
  - Champions (3): 1957, 1964, 1965
- Division Honneur Sud-Est Languedoc
  - Champions (3): 1954, 1958, 1959
- Division Honneur Régionale (Méditerranée)
  - Champions (1): 2010
- Coupe de Provence
  - Champions (2): 1943, 1985
  - Runners-up (2): 1977, 2010
