= Christophe Taine =

French footballer and manager (born 1973)

Personal information
- Full name: Christophe Taine
- Date of birth: 12 December 1973 (age 52)
- Place of birth: Caudry, France
- Height: 1.75 m (5 ft 9 in)
- Position: Attacking midfielder

Team information
- Current team: FC 93 (manager)

Senior career*
Years	Team	Apps	(Gls)
1993–1994	Beauvais	4	(0)
1994	Fécamp	15	(6)
1994–1995	Troyes	27	(14)
1995–1996	Amiens SC	22	(2)
1996–1997	Paris FC	13	(7)
1997	Levallois	14	(3)
1997–1998	Sedan	25	(4)
1998–1999	Istres	23	(2)
1999	Limoges	9	(5)
1999–2000	Levallois	?	(?)
2000–2001	Noisy-le-Sec	21	(1)
2001–2002	Abbeville	8	(0)
2002–2003	Jura Sud	17	(0)
2003–2004	Vesoul Haute-Saône	3	(0)
2004–2005	AC Amiens	?	(?)

Managerial career
- 2008–2010: Franconville
- 2010–2011: Ararat Issy
- 2011–2012: UJA Paris
- 2012: UJA Maccabi
- 2013: UJA Paris
- 2013–2015: Paris FC
- 2015: ASA Issy (women)
- 2017–2018: Bastia-Borgo
- 2018–2019: Fleury
- 2019–2020: Évreux
- 2021–2022: Muret
- 2022–: FC 93
- * Club domestic league appearances and goals

Christophe Taine (born 12 December 1973) is a French professional football manager and former player who is the head coach of Championnat National 1 club FC 93. As a player, he was an attacking midfielder.

== Managerial career ==
Formerly, Taine had been the head coach of Fleury, and in January 2019, he was put in charge of setting up the youth academy at the club.

On 10 June 2022, Taine was appointed as head coach of Championnat National 2 side FC 93.
