= Olivier Guillou =

French football manager (1964–2015)

Personal information
- Date of birth: 14 March 1964
- Place of birth: France
- Date of death: 11 November 2015 (aged 51)
- Place of death: Belgium

Senior career*
Years	Team	Apps	(Gls)
- Beaune
- Ancenis
- Saint-Nazaire

Managerial career
- 2011–2012: Paradou AC
- 2012: Paris
- 2015: Lierse
- * Club domestic league appearances and goals

Olivier Guillou (14 March 1964 – 11 November 2015) was a French football manager. He notably managed Belgian Pro League club Lierse during the 2014–15 season and was a co-founder of the JMG Academy.

== Personal life ==
Guillou was the nephew of French international footballer Jean-Marc Guillou. During his life, he lived in numerous countries including Algeria, Ivory Coast and Madagascar.

On 11 November 2015, Guillou died of a heart attack while on a trip to Belgium, aged 51.

== Coaching career ==
Between 1992 and 1998, Guillou worked in the youth setup at Nice. Together with his uncle, he founded the JMG Academy in partnership with Algerian club Paradou AC, where he was also manager during the 2011–12 season. He left Algeria in 2012 to take up the manager's post at French Championnat National side Paris. However, his tenure was brief and he was replaced by his assistant Alexandre Monier in October that same year.

In January 2015, Guillou was appointed manager of Belgian Pro League side Lierse following the departure of Slaviša Stojanović. Tasked with keeping the club in the top tier of Belgian football, Guillou won 7 of his 17 matches in charge but was unable to prevent relegation and subsequently left the club. Until his death, he remained involved with the JMG Academy.
