= Laurent Hatton =

French association football player and manager

Personal information
- Date of birth: 28 September 1962 (age 64)
- Place of birth: Pacy-sur-Eure, France

Managerial career
- Years: Team
- 1988-2001: Pacy Ménilless
- 2004-2005: Al-Rayyan (Qatar) (youth)
- 2007-2011: Pacy Ménilless
- 2012: Quevilly-Rouen
- 2015-2017: Guinea (assistant)
- 2017: Persikabo 1973
- 2017-2019: Poissy

Laurent Hatton (born 28 September 1962) is a French football manager who is last known to have managed Poissy.

== Career ==
In 1988, Hatton was appointed manager of French sixth division side Pacy Ménilless, helping them earn promotion to the French third division. In 2004, he was appointed youth manager of Al-Rayyan in Qatar. In 2007, he returned to French fourth division club Pacy Ménilless, helping them earn promotion to the French third division. In 2012, Hatton was appointed manager of Quevilly-Rouen in the French third division. In 2015, he was appointed assistant manager of Guinea, where he said, ¨The selection is made by the federation but not by the coaches.¨ In 2017, Hatton was appointed manager of Indonesian team Persikabo 1973. In 2017, he was appointed manager of Poissy in France.
