= Michel Estevan =

French footballer (born 1961)

Personal information
- Date of birth: 28 September 1961 (age 65)
- Place of birth: Algiers, French Algeria
- Position: Midfielder

Youth career
- 1972–1978: FC Tarascon

Senior career*
Years	Team	Apps	(Gls)
1978–1980	Arles		
1980–1982	Nîmes		
1982–1984	Arles		
1984–1987	Sète		
1987–1991	Avignon		
1991–1994	Stade Beaucairois		

Managerial career
- 1991–2002: Stade Beaucairois
- 2002–2003: Martigues
- 2004: Martigues
- 2005–2010: Arles-Avignon
- 2010–2011: Boulogne
- 2012–2015: Fréjus Saint-Raphaël
- 2016–2017: Châteauroux
- 2017–2019: UMS Montélimar
- 2019: Tours
- 2021–: Arles
- * Club domestic league appearances and goals

Michel Estevan (born 28 September 1961) is a French football manager and former player.

== Playing career ==
Estevan spent his playing career as a midfielder in the lower ranks of French football, making his professional debut in 1980 with Arles. After several years around France, he joined amateurs Stade Beaucairois in 1991 as a player-manager.

== Coaching career ==
After three years with amateurs Stade Beaucairois as a player-manager (from 1991 to 1994), Estevan focused solely on his coaching duties, and managed to guide his club to win promotion to the Championnat National (third tier) in 2002. He left thereafter to join Martigues with little success (also because of financial issues), and in 2005 he was appointed head coach of his former club Arles, who were playing amateurs in the Championnat de France amateur 2 at the time of his signing.

Estevan led AC Arles-Avignon from the Championnat de France amateur 2, the fifth division of French football, to the first division Ligue 1 before being relieved from his position on 30 June 2010. On 7 July, after meeting with the club's chairmen, Estevan was retained by the club despite being sacked the previous week. Eventually he was sacked by the club on 17 September.

With Arles, Estevan achieved an incredible feat of winning four promotions in his five seasons in charge, of which the latest one was probably the most surprising, as he achieved third place in the club's first season in Ligue 2 (with the club now named AC Arles-Avignon), thus winning promotion to the French top flight despite having the lowest budget in the league. Such results awarded him comparisons to French managing legends Guy Roux and Michel Le Milinaire, the only ones who had managed to win four promotions in five seasons before Estevan.
