= USJA Carquefou =

Association football club

Coordinates: 47.284706°N 1.482268°W

Carquefou
- Full name: Union Sportive de la Jeanne d’Arc de Carquefou
- Nickname(s): Les Verts et Blancs (The Green and Whites)
- Founded: 1942
- Ground: Stade du Moulin-Boisseau, Carquefou
- Capacity: 3,500
- Chairman: Michel Auray
- Manager: Denis Renaud
- League: National
- 2012-13: Championnat National, 6th
Home colours	Away colours

USJA Carquefou is a French football team currently playing in Championnat National based in Carquefou, Loire-Atlantique.

== History ==
The club was founded in 1942 as merger of two local clubs, Union Sportive de Carquefou and Jeanne d'Arc de Carquefou, the latter being a sports team whose football section was founded three years earlier.

During the 2007–2008 season, Carquefou had a very successful Coupe de France campaign, reaching the quarter-finals in the competition after having defeated Olympique Marseille in the round of 16 despite the club's amateur status. Carquefou continued successes and promoted to CFA after winning Group G of CFA 2 in 2008–2009 season. Carquefou finally won Group D of CFA and promoted to Championnat National once in 2011–12 season.

== Current squad ==
Note: Flags indicate national team as defined under FIFA eligibility rules; some limited exceptions apply. Players may hold more than one non-FIFA nationality.

No.	Pos.	Nation	Player
1	GK	(France) FRA	Alexandre Bouchard
2	DF	(France) FRA	Marc Fachan
3	DF	(France) FRA	Philippe Billy
5	MF	(France) FRA	Vincent Durand
6	MF	(France) FRA	Damien Fachan
7	FW	(Republic of the Congo) CGO	Rahavi Kifoueti
8	MF	(France) FRA	Steven Pinto-Borges
9	FW	(France) FRA	Sacha Clemence
10	MF	(Morocco) MAR	Hamza Hafidi
11	FW	(France) FRA	Florian Jégu
12	MF	(Gabon) GAB	Merlin Tandjigora
14	DF	(France) FRA	Romain Gravelaine
15	DF	(France) FRA	Arnaud Maire

No.	Pos.	Nation	Player
16	GK	(France) FRA	Alban Joinel
17	FW	(Cameroon) CMR	Jean-Pierre N'Samé
18	FW	(Gabon) GAB	Fabrice Do Marcolino
19	FW	(France) FRA	Lassana Doucouré
20	DF	(France) FRA	Yoann David
21	DF	(Democratic Republic of the Congo) COD	Hérita Ilunga
24	DF	(France) FRA	Loïc Guillon
25	FW	(Ivory Coast) CIV	Henry Gbizié
27	DF	(France) FRA	Pierre Gibaud
28	FW	(France) FRA	Aurélien Gazeau
30	GK	(France) FRA	Charles Cieslinsky
31	GK	(France) FRA	Valentin Prevost

== Reserve squad ==
The Reserve team played in the DH Atlantique.

Note: Flags indicate national team as defined under FIFA eligibility rules; some limited exceptions apply. Players may hold more than one non-FIFA nationality.

No.	Pos.	Nation	Player
—	GK	(France) FRA	David Alexandre Denieul
—	GK	(France) FRA	Loïc Vincent
—	DF	(France) FRA	Kessim Badri
—	DF	(France) FRA	Valentin Broudic
—	DF	(France) FRA	Romain Fromentin
—	DF	(France) FRA	François Guihard
—	DF	(France) FRA	Maxime Ranguilla
—	DF	(France) FRA	Philippe Nana Tonzi
—	DF	(France) FRA	David Vespuce

No.	Pos.	Nation	Player
—	MF	(France) FRA	David Bénéfix
—	MF	(France) FRA	Bastien Clavaud
—	MF	(France) FRA	Sébastien Delatouche
—	MF	(France) FRA	Pierre Marceul
—	MF	(France) FRA	Karim Merbah
—	MF	(France) FRA	Jean Philippe Roussel
—	FW	(France) FRA	Thomas Audren
—	FW	(France) FRA	Erwan Bertray
