= Yannick Goyon =

French footballer (born 1981)

Personal information
- Date of birth: 22 June 1981 (age 45)
- Place of birth: Mâcon, France
- Height: 1.83 m (6 ft 0 in)
- Position: Defender

Senior career*
Years	Team	Apps	(Gls)
1999–2001	Bourg-Péronnas	42	(1)
2001–2002	Limoges	23	(1)
2002–2004	Orléans		
2004–2007	Jura Sud	94	(2)
2007–2010	Besançon	63	(5)
2010–2016	Bourg-Péronnas	142	(4)
- * Club domestic league appearances and goals as of 00:22, 7 February 2018 (UTC)

Yannick Goyon (born 22 June 1981) is a retired French professional footballer who played as a defender.

Since making his senior debut with Bourg-Péronnas in the 1999–2000 season, Goyon has played for a number of clubs in the French lower leagues, including Limoges, Orléans, Jura Sud and Besançon. In 2015, during his second spell with the club, he was part of the Bourg-Péronnas side that won promotion to Ligue 2 for the first time in their history.
