= Régis Brouard =

French footballer and manager (born 1967)

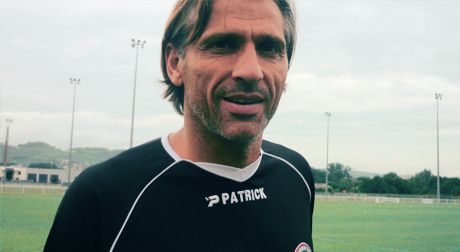
- Brouard as Clermont manager

Personal information
- Date of birth: 17 January 1967 (age 59)
- Place of birth: Antony, France
- Height: 1.83 m (6 ft 0 in)
- Position: Midfielder

Team information
- Current team: Rouen (Manager)

Senior career*
Years	Team	Apps	(Gls)
1985–1990	Rodez	127	(12)
1990–1992	Montpellier	9	(0)
1992–1994	Bourges	61	(8)
1994–1996	Chamois Niortais	65	(10)
1996–1997	Red Star	33	(14)
1997–1999	Caen	61	(9)
1999–2001	Nîmes	56	(4)
2001–2003	Cannes	40	(4)
Total		452	(61)

Managerial career
- 2003–2005: Rodez
- 2005–2007: Nîmes
- 2008–2012: US Quevilly
- 2012–2014: Clermont
- 2014–2016: Chamois Niortais
- 2016–2017: A.F.C. Tubize
- 2017–2018: Red Star
- 2019–2021: Racing-Union
- 2021–2024: Bastia
- 2024–: Rouen
- * Club domestic league appearances and goals

Régis Brouard (born 17 January 1967) is a French football manager and former professional player who manages Rouen. He played as a midfielder.

== Coaching career ==
Brouard was appointed as head coach of Red Star, newly relegated to the French third tier, for the 2017–18 season. He was fired by Red Star on 29 October 2018. He led the club to promotion to second tier and National title after one season in charge.

In August 2019, he joined Luxembourgish club Racing FC Union Luxembourg, signing a two-year contract. His stated aim was to win the championship.

On 2 October 2021, Brouard was hired by Ligue 2 club Bastia.

On 4 November 2024 he was named as the new manager of French club FC Rouen.
