= 2019–20 Coupe de la Ligue =

French League Cup

Tournament details
- Country: France
- Dates: 26 July 2019 – 31 July 2020

Final positions
- Champions: Paris Saint-Germain (9th title)
- Runners-up: Lyon

Tournament statistics
- Matches played: 44
- Goals scored: 132 (3 per match)
- Top goal scorer(s): Mauro Icardi; Livio Nabab; Moses Simon (3 goals each)

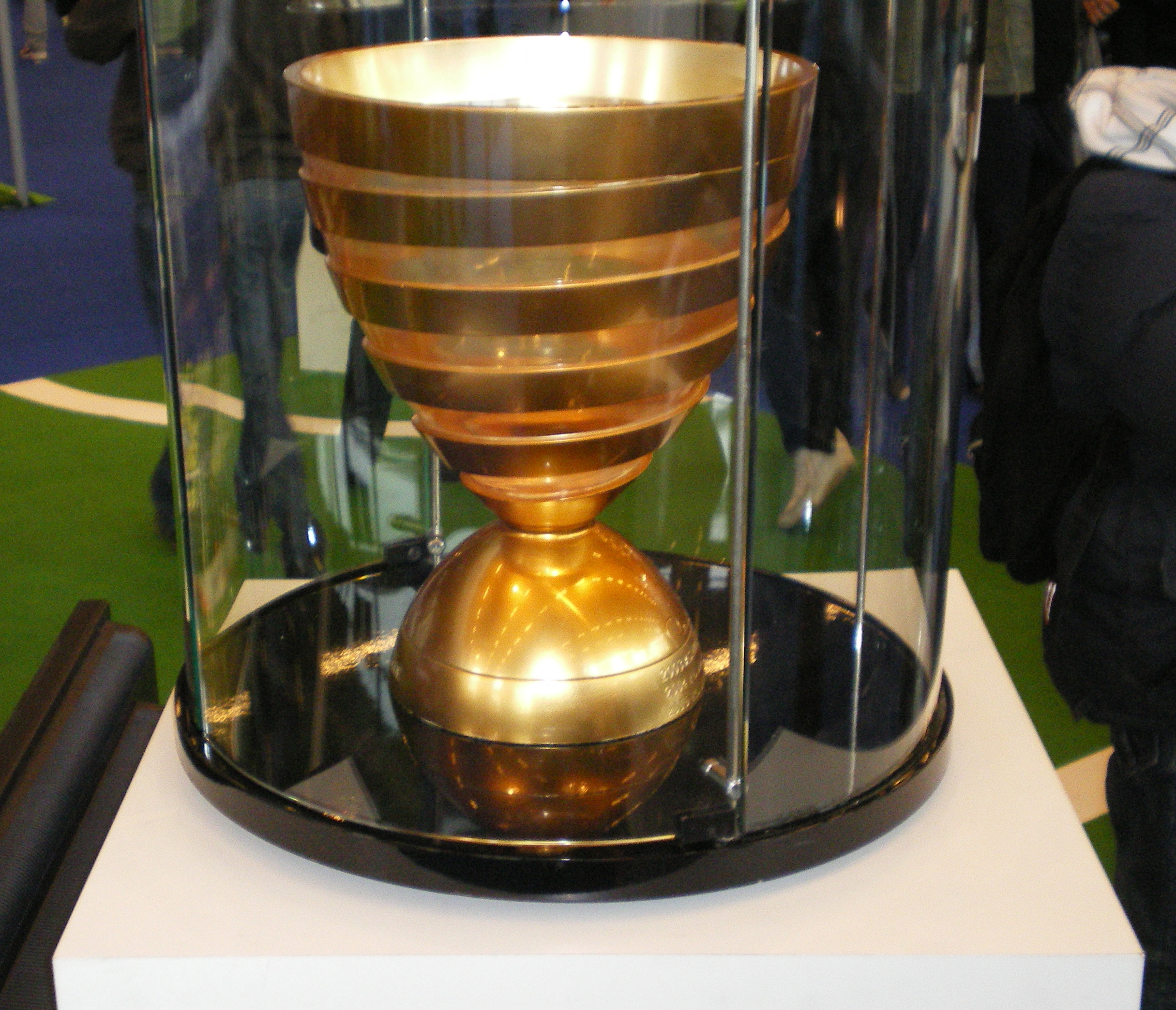
The trophy of the competition.

The 2019–20 Coupe de la Ligue, also known as Coupe de la Ligue BKT for sponsorship reasons, was the 26th and final edition of the league cup competition held in France. The competition began with the preliminary round on 26 July 2019.

Strasbourg were the defending champions after defeating Guingamp in the final of the previous edition, but were eliminated in the quarter-finals in a penalty shoot-out to Reims after a goalless draw.

On 18 September 2019, the Ligue de Football Professionnel voted to suspend the competition indefinitely following the 2019–20 edition, in order to "reduce the season schedule".

On 28 April 2020, Prime Minister Edouard Philippe announced all sporting events in France would be cancelled until September. On 26 June, the FFF announced that the final was rescheduled to 31 July.

Paris Saint-Germain won their ninth Coupe de la Ligue title following a 6–5 win on penalties over Lyon in the final.

== Preliminary round ==
A preliminary round match was played on 26 July 2019.

| 26 July 2019 | Bourg-Péronnas (3) | 1–0 | Quevilly-Rouen (3) | Bourg-en-Bresse |
| 18:45 CEST | Lacour 19' | Report | | Stadium: Stade Marcel-Verchère; Attendance: 368; Referee: Bartolomeu Varela |

== First round ==
Twelve first round matches were played on 13 August 2019.

| 13 August 2019 | Lorient (2) | 1–2 | Le Mans (2) | Lorient |
| 18:45 CEST | Hamel 83' | Report | Moussiti-Oko 42'; Diarra 62' | Stadium: Stade du Moustoir; Attendance: 7,454; Referee: Alexandre Perreau Niel |

| 13 August 2019 | Clermont (2) | 1–1 (4–3 p) | Le Havre (2) | Clermont-Ferrand |
| 20:00 CEST | N'Diaye 22' (pen.) | Report | Dzabana 6' | Stadium: Stade Gabriel Montpied; Attendance: 1,785; Referee: Cédric Dos Santos |
| | Penalties |
| | Grbic (penalty scored); Donisa (penalty scored); González (penalty missed); Gastien (penalty scored); N'Simba (penalty scored) | | (penalty scored) Abdelli; (penalty scored) Dzabana; (penalty missed) Fontaine; (penalty scored) Bazile; (penalty missed) Basque |

| 13 August 2019 | Grenoble (2) | 1–1 (4–3 p) | Rodez (2) | Grenoble |
| 20:00 CEST | Semedo 43' | Report | Ouhafsa 76' (pen.) | Stadium: Stade des Alpes; Attendance: 2,265; Referee: Gaël Angoula |
| | Penalties |
| | Tinhan (penalty scored); M'Changama (penalty scored); Vandenabeele (penalty scored); Djitté (penalty missed); Elogo (penalty scored) | | (penalty scored) Dieng; (penalty scored) Maanane; (penalty scored) Ouhafsa; (penalty missed) Poujol; (penalty missed) Ouammou |

| 13 August 2019 | Gazélec Ajaccio (3) | 2–0 | Chambly (2) | Ajaccio |
| 20:00 CEST | Beusnard 8' (pen.); Kyei 90' | Report | | Stadium: Stade Ange Casanova; Referee: Eric Wattellier |

| 13 August 2019 | Paris FC (2) | 2–1 | Sochaux (2) | Paris |
| 20:00 CEST | Abdeldjelil 56'; Pitroipa 77' (pen.) | Report | Lasme 36' | Stadium: Stade Sébastien Charléty; Attendance: 1,012; Referee: Aurélien Petit |

| 13 August 2019 | Niort (2) | 3–1 | Châteauroux (2) | Niort |
| 20:00 CEST | Konaté 45'; Koyalipou 83'; Leautey 90' | Report | Diarra 9' | Stadium: Stade René Gaillard; Attendance: 2,191; Referee: Rémi Landry |

| 13 August 2019 | Caen (2) | 0–1 | Nancy (2) | Caen |
| 20:00 CEST | | Report | Gueye 64' | Stadium: Stade Michel d'Ornano; Attendance: 7,807; Referee: Nicolas Rainville |

| 13 August 2019 | Ajaccio (2) | 4–1 | Valenciennes (2) | Ajaccio |
| 20:00 CEST | Laçi 9'; Tramoni 42'; Mendes 45'; Lejeune 81' | Report | Ntim 59' | Stadium: Stade François Coty; Attendance: 1,815; Referee: Bastien Dechepy |

| 13 August 2019 | Auxerre (2) | 0–0 (5–6 p) | Béziers (3) | Auxerre |
| 20:00 CEST | | Report | | Stadium: Stade de l'Abbé-Deschamps; Attendance: 4,218; Referee: Romain Lissorgue |
| | Penalties |
| | Dugimont (penalty scored); Bellugou (penalty scored); Marcelin (penalty scored); Bernard (penalty missed); Touré (penalty scored); Begraoui (penalty scored); Coeff (penalty missed) | | (penalty scored) Montiel; (penalty scored) El Hamzaoui; (penalty scored) Elissalt; (penalty scored) Fumu Tamuzo; (penalty missed) Ammour; (penalty scored) Testud; (penalty scored) Mostefa |

| 13 August 2019 | Orléans (2) | 4–1 | Guingamp (2) | Orléans |
| 20:00 CEST | Sorbon 27' (o.g.); Perrin 34'; Benkaid 84', 90' | Report | Roux 79' | Stadium: Stade de la Source; Attendance: 3,781; Referee: Florent Batta |

| 13 August 2019 | Bourg-Péronnas (3) | 2–2 (7–6 p) | Red Star (3) | Bourg-en-Bresse |
| 20:00 CEST | Nabab 51', 79' | Report | Chahiri 28', 43' | Stadium: Stade Marcel-Verchère; Attendance: 878; Referee: Thierry Bouille |
| | Penalties |
| | Lacour (penalty scored); Romany (penalty scored); Lemb (penalty missed); Irep (penalty scored); Sacko (penalty scored); Nirlo (penalty scored); Boujedra (penalty scored); Perradin (penalty scored) | | (penalty missed) Sao; (penalty scored) Goujon; (penalty scored) Chemlal; (penalty scored) Baradji; (penalty scored) Hamache; (penalty scored) Roye; (penalty scored) Arab; (penalty missed) Mendy |

| 13 August 2019 | Troyes (2) | 1–2 | Lens (2) | Troyes |
| 21:05 CEST | Kouyaté 10' | Report | Sene 75'; Banza 84' | Stadium: Stade de l'Aube; Attendance: 3,160; Referee: Bartolomeu Varela |

== Second round ==
Six second round matches were played on 27 August 2019.

| 27 August 2019 | Bourg-Péronnas (3) | 1–1 (6–5 p) | Béziers (3) | Bourg-en-Bresse |
| 20:00 CEST | Nabab 40' | Report | Morante 90+2' | Stadium: Stade Marcel-Verchère; Attendance: 809; Referee: Bastien Dechepy |
| | Penalties |
| | Khous (penalty scored); Sacko (penalty scored); Lemb (penalty scored); Romany (penalty scored); Nabab (penalty scored); Perradin (penalty scored) | | (penalty scored) Montiel; (penalty scored) El Hamzaoui; (penalty scored) Ammour; (penalty scored) Tacalfred; (penalty scored) Testud; (penalty missed) Mostefa |

| 27 August 2019 | Nancy (2) | 1–0 | Ajaccio (2) | Tomblaine |
| 18:45 CEST | Dembélé 67' | Report | | Stadium: Stade Marcel Picot; Attendance: 5,071; Referee: Arnaud Baert |

| 27 August 2019 | Lens (2) | 2–2 (5–4 p) | Clermont (2) | Lens |
| 21:05 CEST | Sotoca 43'; Mesloub 61' (pen.) | Report | Rajot 12'; González 48' | Stadium: Stade Bollaert-Delelis; Attendance: 11,909; Referee: Benjamin Lepaysant |
| | Penalties |
| | Boli (penalty scored); Sotoca (penalty missed); Mauricio (penalty scored); Banza (penalty scored); Gillet (penalty scored); Traoré (penalty scored) | | (penalty scored) Grbić; (penalty scored) Donisa; (penalty scored) Rajot; (penalty missed) N'Diaye; (penalty scored) N'Simba; (penalty missed) Magnin |

| 27 August 2019 | Le Mans (2) | 2–2 (8–7 p) | Orléans (2) | Le Mans |
| 20:00 CEST | Moussiti-Oko 85'; Lemonnier 90' | Report | Scheidler 7', 53' | Stadium: MMArena; Attendance: 6,422; Referee: Aurélien Petit |
| | Penalties |
| | Créhin (penalty scored); Lévêque (penalty scored); Maziz (penalty scored); Manzala (penalty missed); Moussiti-Oko (penalty scored); Lemonnier (penalty scored); Boé-Kane (penalty scored); Vardin (penalty missed); Musavu-King (penalty scored); Boissier (penalty scored) | | (penalty scored) Thill; (penalty scored) Demoncy; (penalty missed) D'Arpino; (penalty scored) Benkaid; (penalty scored) Perrin; (penalty scored) Luzayadio; (penalty scored) Mutombo; (penalty missed) Lopy; (penalty scored) Talal; (penalty missed) Thiam |

| 27 August 2019 | Niort (2) | 0–0 (5–4 p) | Grenoble (2) | Niort |
| 20:00 CEST | | Report | | Stadium: Stade René Gaillard; Attendance: 2,372; Referee: Mehdi Mokhtari |
| | Penalties |
| | Jacob (penalty scored); Louiserre (penalty scored); Bena (penalty scored); Kemen (penalty scored); Koyalipou (penalty scored) | | (penalty scored) Tinhan; (penalty scored) M'Changama; (penalty scored) Monfray; (penalty scored) Ondaan; (penalty missed) Brun |

| 27 August 2019 | Gazélec Ajaccio (3) | 1–1 (5–6 p) | Paris FC (2) | Ajaccio |
| 20:00 CEST | Kanté 89' (o.g.) | Report | Sarr 75' | Stadium: Stade Ange Casanova; Attendance: 1,515; Referee: Sylvain Palhies |
| | Penalties |
| | Beusnard (penalty scored); Piechocki (penalty missed); Pollet (penalty scored); Anziani (penalty scored); Pierazzi (penalty scored); Pineau (penalty scored); Lebon (penalty missed) | | (penalty scored) Mandouki; (penalty scored) Abdeldjelil; (penalty scored) Martin; (penalty missed) Abdi; (penalty scored) Nomenjanahary; (penalty scored) Saad; (penalty scored) Kanté |

== Third round ==
The draw for the third round of matches was held on 19 September 2019.

| 29 October 2019 | Nîmes (1) | 3–0 | Lens (2) | Nîmes |
| 18:45 CET | Sene 24' (o.g.); Sainte-Luce 39'; Stojanovski 87' (pen.) | Report | | Stadium: Stade des Costières; Attendance: 6,284; Referee: Frank Schneider |

| 29 October 2019 | Bordeaux (1) | 2–0 | Dijon (1) | Bordeaux |
| 21:05 CET | Maja 8'; De Préville 90+4' | Report | | Stadium: Matmut Atlantique; Attendance: 11,391; Referee: Thomas Léonard |

| 30 October 2019 | Le Mans (2) | 3–2 | Nice (1) | Le Mans |
| 18:45 CET | Créhin 1'; Lemonnier 13'; Kanté 16' | Report | Cyprien 15' (pen.); Lees-Melou 18' | Stadium: MMArena; Attendance: 12,260; Referee: Benoît Millot |

| 30 October 2019 | Nantes (1) | 8–0 | Paris FC (2) | Nantes |
| 21:05 CET | Simon 22', 35', 43'; Youan 30'; Blas 36', 63'; Louza 47'; Abeid 84' | Report | | Stadium: Stade de la Beaujoire; Attendance: 15,475; Referee: Jérémy Stinat |

| 30 October 2019 | Metz (1) | 1–1 (3–4 p) | Brest (1) | Metz |
| 21:05 CET | Niane 23' | Report | Cardona 57' | Stadium: Stade Saint-Symphorien; Attendance: 5,262; Referee: Jérôme Brisard |
| | Penalties |
| | Niane (penalty scored); Nguette (penalty missed); N'Doram (penalty scored); Traoré (penalty scored); Boulaya (penalty missed) | | (penalty scored) Cardona; (penalty scored) Diallo; (penalty missed) Chardonnet; (penalty scored) Court; (penalty scored) Battocchio |

| 30 October 2019 | Monaco (1) | 2–1 | Marseille (1) | Monaco |
| 21:05 CET | Augustin 25'; Aguilar 40' | Report | Lecomte 77' (o.g.) | Stadium: Stade Louis II; Attendance: 9,883; Referee: Mikael Lesage |

| 30 October 2019 | Reims (1) | 2–1 | Bourg-Péronnas (3) | Reims |
| 21:05 CET | Kutesa 14'; Doumbia 36' | Report | Matam 74' | Stadium: Stade Auguste-Delaune; Attendance: 5,479; Referee: Eric Wattellier |

| 30 October 2019 | Montpellier (1) | 3–2 | Nancy (2) | Montpellier |
| 21:05 CET | Mollet 13'; Delort 21'; Chotard 76' | Report | Vagner 60'; Lybohy 90' | Stadium: Stade de la Mosson; Attendance: 7,655; Referee: Hakim Ben El Hadj |

| 30 October 2019 | Amiens (1) | 3–2 | Angers (1) | Amiens |
| 21:05 CET | Otero 47'; Cornette 50'; Blin 90+5' | Report | Bahoken 44'; Kanga 83' | Stadium: Stade de la Licorne; Attendance: 5,217; Referee: François Letexier |

| 30 October 2019 | Niort (2) | 1–2 | Toulouse (1) | Niort |
| 21:05 CET | Sissoko 11' (pen.) | Report | Gradel 52'; Sanogo 81' | Stadium: Stade René Gaillard; Attendance: 3,443; Referee: Florent Batta |

== Round of 16 ==
The draw for the Round of 16 matches was held on 12 November 2019.

| 17 December 2019 | Reims (1) | 1–0 | Montpellier (1) | Reims |
| 18:45 CET | Cafaro 78' (pen.) | Report | | Stadium: Stade Auguste-Delaune; Attendance: 4,606; Referee: Willy Delajod |

| 17 December 2019 | Monaco (1) | 0–3 | Lille (1) | Monaco |
| 21:05 CET | | Report | Osimhen 19'; Rémy 45+2', 86' | Stadium: Stade Louis II; Attendance: 5,384; Referee: Johan Hamel |

| 18 December 2019 | Lyon (1) | 4–1 | Toulouse (1) | Décines-Charpieu |
| 18:45 CET | Traoré 2', 57'; Jean Lucas 17'; Terrier 90+1' | Report | Koné 48' | Stadium: Parc Olympique Lyonnais; Attendance: 21,902; Referee: Thomas Leonard |

| 18 December 2019 | Le Mans (2) | 1–4 | Paris Saint-Germain (1) | Le Mans |
| 21:05 CET | Manzala 53' | Report | Sarabia 21'; Choupo-Moting 40'; Mbappé 41'; Di María 47' | Stadium: MMArena; Attendance: 24,425; Referee: Hakim Ben El Hadj |

| 18 December 2019 | Amiens (1) | 3–2 | Rennes (1) | Amiens |
| 21:05 CET | Zungu 35'; Mendoza 42'; Monconduit 90+1' | Report | Bourigeaud 27' (pen.); Hunou 73' | Stadium: Stade de la Licorne; Attendance: 4,883; Referee: Stéphanie Frappart |

| 18 December 2019 | Nantes (1) | 0–1 | Strasbourg (1) | Nantes |
| 21:05 CET | | Report | Da Costa 78' | Stadium: Stade de la Beaujoire; Attendance: 9,565; Referee: Eric Wattellier |

| 18 December 2019 | Nîmes (1) | 1–2 | Saint-Étienne (1) | Nîmes |
| 21:05 CET | Stojanovski 68' | Report | Benkhedim 38'; Edmilson 50' | Stadium: Stade des Costières; Attendance: 4,240; Referee: Antony Gautier |

| 18 December 2019 | Brest (1) | 2–0 | Bordeaux (1) | Brest |
| 21:05 CET | Grandsir 50'; Charbonnier 63' | Report | | Stadium: Stade Francis-Le Blé; Attendance: 5,434; Referee: Jérémie Pignard |

== Quarter-finals ==
The draw for the quarter-final matches was held on 18 December 2019.

| 7 January 2020 | Reims (1) | 0–0 (4–2 p) | Strasbourg (1) | Reims |
| 21:00 CET | | Report | | Stadium: Stade Auguste-Delaune; Attendance: 10,202; Referee: François Letexier |
| | Penalties |
| | Donis (penalty missed); Oudin (penalty scored); Disasi (penalty scored); Kamara (penalty scored); Abdelhamid (penalty scored) | | (penalty scored) Djiku; (penalty scored) Ajorque; (penalty missed) Bellegarde; (penalty missed) Corgnet |

| 8 January 2020 | Lyon (1) | 3–1 | Brest (1) | Décines-Charpieu |
| 18:45 CET | Dembélé 19'; Aouar 55'; Jean Lucas 90+1' | Report | Grandsir 85' | Stadium: Parc Olympique Lyonnais; Attendance: 20,096; Referee: Jérôme Brisard |

| 8 January 2020 | Lille (1) | 2–0 | Amiens (1) | Villeneuve-d'Ascq |
| 21:05 CET | Luiz Araújo 50'; Osimhen 58' | Report | | Stadium: Stade Pierre-Mauroy; Attendance: 19,029; Referee: Benoît Bastien |

| 8 January 2020 | Paris Saint-Germain (1) | 6–1 | Saint-Étienne (1) | Paris |
| 21:05 CET | Icardi 2', 49', 57'; Neymar 39'; Moulin 44' (o.g.); Mbappé 67' | Report | Cabaye 71' | Stadium: Parc des Princes; Attendance: 47,677; Referee: Clément Turpin |

== Semi-finals ==
The draw for the semi-final matches was held on 9 January 2020.

| 21 January 2020 | Lyon (1) | 2–2 (4–3 p) | Lille (1) | Décines-Charpieu |
| 21:10 CET | Dembélé 17' (pen.); Aouar 85' | Report | Sanches 12'; Rémy 90+3' (pen.) | Stadium: Parc Olympique Lyonnais; Attendance: 35,248; Referee: Benoît Millot |
| | Penalties |
| | Dembélé (penalty scored); Terrier (penalty scored); Cornet (penalty scored); T. Mendes (penalty scored) | | (penalty missed) Bamba; (penalty scored) Rémy; (penalty scored) André; (penalty scored) Osimhen; (penalty missed) Sanches |

| 22 January 2020 | Reims (1) | 0–3 | Paris Saint-Germain (1) | Reims |
| 21:00 CET | | Report | Marquinhos 9'; Konan 31' (o.g.); Kouassi 77' | Stadium: Stade Auguste-Delaune; Attendance: 20,437; Referee: Mikael Lesage |

== Final ==
The final was originally scheduled for 4 April 2020 but was postponed due to concerns over the COVID-19 pandemic.

31 July 2020
21:10 CEST

| Paris Saint-Germain | 0–0 (a.e.t.) | Lyon |
|---|---|---|
| | Report |
Penalties
| Di María (penalty scored); Verratti (penalty scored); Paredes (penalty scored); Herrera (penalty scored); Neymar (penalty scored); Sarabia (penalty scored) | 6–5 | (penalty scored) Andersen; (penalty scored) Toko Ekambi; (penalty scored) Caqueret; (penalty scored) Mendes; (penalty scored) Aouar; (penalty missed) Traoré |

Stade de France, Saint-Denis
Attendance: 3,500 (Note: The final was played in front of 3,500 spectators due to the COVID-19 pandemic in France.)
Referee: Jérôme Brisard

== See also ==
- 2019–20 Ligue 1
- 2019–20 Ligue 2
