= 2017–18 Stade de Reims season =

Stade de Reims
2017–18 season
- President: Jean-Pierre Caillot
- Head coach: David Guion
- Stadium: Stade Auguste-Delaune
- Ligue 2: 1st (promoted)
- Coupe de France: Eighth round
- Coupe de la Ligue: Second round
- Top goalscorer: League: Theoson-Jordan Siebatcheu (17); All: Theoson-Jordan Siebatcheu (18)
Home colours	Away colours

The 2017–18 season was the 88th season in the existence of Stade de Reims and the club's second consecutive season in the second division of French football. In addition to the domestic league, Reims participated in this season's editions of the Coupe de France and the Coupe de la Ligue.

== Players ==
=== First-team squad ===
As of 27 February 2018.

Note: Flags indicate national team as defined under FIFA eligibility rules; some limited exceptions apply. Players may hold more than one non-FIFA nationality.

No.	Pos.	Nation	Player
1	GK	FRA	Johann Carrasso
2	DF	FRA	Hendrick Cakin
4	MF	FRA	Mathieu Cafaro
5	DF	MAR	Yunis Abdelhamid
7	MF	FRA	Xavier Chavalerin
8	MF	FRA	Marvin Martin
9	FW	GEQ	Anatole Ngamukol
10	MF	BRA	Diego Rigonato
11	FW	FRA	Grejohn Kyei
12	FW	ARG	Pablo Chavarría
13	MF	GAM	Hassane Kamara
14	MF	FRA	Grégory Berthier
15	DF	FRA	Romain Métanire
16	GK	GBS	Edouard Mendy
17	MF	FRA	Aly Ndom

No.	Pos.	Nation	Player
18	FW	FRA	Rémi Oudin
19	FW	FRA	Theoson Siebatcheu
20	DF	FRA	Samuel Bouhours
21	MF	CPV	Danilson da Cruz
23	DF	FRA	Julian Jeanvier
24	DF	FRA	Lenny Vallier
25	DF	FRA	Yohan Roche
26	MF	COD	Nolan Mbemba
27	DF	CMR	Moussa Bana
28	MF	FRA	Virgile Piechocki
29	DF	FRA	Patrick Bahanack
30	GK	FRA	Nicolas Lemaître
33	DF	FRA	Axel Disasi
—	FW	FRA	Steve Shamal

== Transfers ==
=== In ===
No.	Pos	Player	Transferred from	Fee	Date	Source
2	DF	(France) Hendrick Cakin	(France) FC Nantes reserve	Free transfer	28 June 2017	
4	MF	(France) Mathieu Cafaro	Free agent	Undisclosed	1 July 2017	
5	DF	(Morocco) Yunis Abdelhamid	(France) Dijon	Undisclosed	1 July 2017	
3	DF	(Mali) Youssouf Koné	(France) Lille	Loan	5 July 2017	

== Competitions ==
=== Overview ===
Competition	First match	Last match	Starting round	Final position	Record							
Competition	First match	Last match	Starting round	Final position	Pld	W	D	L	GF	GA	GD	Win %
Ligue 2	28 July 2017	11 May 2018	Matchday 1	Winners	38	28	4	6	74	24	+50	73.68
Coupe de France	12 November 2017	3 December 2017	Seventh round	Eighth round	2	1	0	1	4	3	+1	50.00
Coupe de la Ligue	8 August 2017	22 August 2017	First round	Second round	2	1	0	1	1	3	−2	50.00
Total					42	30	4	8	79	30	+49	71.43

Source: Soccerway

=== Ligue 2 ===
==== League table ====
Pos	Team	Pld	W	D	L	GF	GA	GD	Pts	Promotion or Relegation
1	Reims (C, P)	38	28	4	6	74	24	+50	88	Promotion to Ligue 1
2	Nîmes (P)	38	22	7	9	75	37	+38	73	Promotion to Ligue 1
3	Ajaccio	38	20	8	10	62	43	+19	68	Qualification to promotion play-offs semi-final
4	Le Havre	38	19	9	10	53	34	+19	66	Qualification to promotion play-offs quarter-final
5	Brest	38	18	11	9	58	43	+15	65	Qualification to promotion play-offs quarter-final

Source: Ligue 2
Rules for classification: 1) Points; 2) Goal difference; 3) Head-to-head points; 4) Head-to-head goal difference; 5) Head-to-head goals scored; 6) Head-to-head away goals; 7) Goals scored; 8) Away goals scored; 9) Most goals scored in one league match; 10) Fair-play points
(C) Champions; (P) Promoted

==== Results summary ====
Overall								Home						Away					
Pld	W	D	L	GF	GA	GD	Pts	W	D	L	GF	GA	GD	W	D	L	GF	GA	GD
38	28	4	6	74	24	+50	88	14	2	3	41	10	+31	14	2	3	33	14	+19

Source: Ligue 2

==== Results by round ====
Round	1	2	3	4	5	6	7	8	9	10	11	12	13	14	15	16	17	18	19	20	21	22	23	24	25	26	27	28	29	30	31	32	33	34	35	36	37	38
Ground	A	H	A	H	A	H	A	H	A	H	A	A	H	A	H	A	H	A	H	A	H	A	H	A	H	A	H	A	H	H	A	H	A	H	A	H	A	H
Result	W	W	W	W	L	L	W	W	W	W	L	W	W	D	D	W	W	W	W	W	W	W	L	D	W	W	W	L	W	W	W	L	W	W	W	W	W	D
Position	5	2	2	2	2	3	2	1	1	1	1	1	1	1	1	1	1	1	1	1	1	1	1	1	1	1	1	1	1	1	1	1	1	1	1	1	1	1

Source: Ligue 2
A = Away; H = Home; W = Win; D = Draw; L = Loss

==== Matches ====
28 July 2017 1	Nîmes	0–1	Reims	Nîmes
CEST (UTC+2)				Stadium: Stade des Costières

5 August 2017 2	Reims	2–0	Orléans	Reims
CEST (UTC+2)				Stadium: Stade Auguste-Delaune

11 August 2017 3	Tours	0–1	Reims	Tours
CEST (UTC+2)				Stadium: Stade de la Vallée du Cher

18 August 2017 4	Reims	3–0	Bourg-Péronnas	Reims
CEST (UTC+2)				Stadium: Stade Auguste-Delaune

26 August 2017 5	Lorient	2–1	Reims	Lorient
CEST (UTC+2)				Stadium: Stade du Moustoir

11 September 2017 6	Reims	0–1	Brest	Reims
CEST (UTC+2)				Stadium: Stade Auguste-Delaune

16 September 2017 7	Sochaux	2–4	Reims	Montbéliard
CEST (UTC+2)				Stadium: Stade Auguste Bonal

19 September 2017 8	Reims	5–0	Gazélec Ajaccio	Reims
CEST (UTC+2)				Stadium: Stade Auguste-Delaune

22 September 2017 9	Quevilly-Rouen	1–2	Reims	Le Petit-Quevilly
CEST (UTC+2)				Stadium: Stade Robert Diochon

30 September 2017 10	Reims	1–0	Clermont	Reims
CEST (UTC+2)				Stadium: Stade Auguste-Delaune

13 October 2017 11	Châteauroux	3–1	Reims	Châteauroux
CEST (UTC+2)				Stadium: Stade Gaston Petit

21 October 2017 12	Lens	0–1	Reims	Lens
CEST (UTC+2)				Stadium: Stade Bollaert-Delelis

28 October 2017 13	Reims	3–0	Nancy	Reims
CET (UTC+1)				Stadium: Stade Auguste-Delaune

6 November 2017 14	Le Havre	0–0	Lens	Le Havre
CET (UTC+1)				Stadium: Stade Océane

17 November 2017 15	Reims	1–1	Paris FC	Reims
CET (UTC+1)				Stadium: Stade Auguste-Delaune

24 November 2017 16	Ajaccio	0–1	Reims	Ajaccio
CET (UTC+1)				Stadium: Stade François Coty

27 November 2017 17	Reims	2–0	Auxerre	Reims
CET (UTC+1)				Stadium: Stade Auguste-Delaune

8 December 2017 18	Niort	1–2	Reims	Niort
CET (UTC+1)				Stadium: Stade René Gaillard

16 December 2017 19	Reims	5–1	Valenciennes	Reims
CET (UTC+1)				Stadium: Stade Auguste-Delaune

12 January 2018 20	Orléans	0–2	Reims	Orléans
CET (UTC+1)				Stadium: Stade de la Source

16 January 2018 21	Reims	1–0	Tours	Reims
CET (UTC+1)				Stadium: Stade Auguste-Delaune

19 January 2018 22	Bourg-Péronnas	0–2	Reims	Bourg-en-Bresse
CET (UTC+1)				Stadium: Stade Marcel-Verchère

29 January 2018 23	Reims	0–1	Lorient	Reims
CET (UTC+1)				Stadium: Stade Auguste-Delaune

5 February 2018 24	Brest	0–0	Reims	Best
CET (UTC+1)				Stadium: Stade Francis-Le Blé

9 February 2018 25	Reims	3–0	Sochaux	Reims
CET (UTC+1)				Stadium: Stade Auguste-Delaune

16 February 2018 26	Gazélec Ajaccio	1–2	Reims	Ajaccio
CET (UTC+1)				Stadium: Stade Ange Casanova

23 February 2018 27	Reims	2–1	Quevilly-Rouen	Reims
CET (UTC+1)				Stadium: Stade Auguste-Delaune

2 March 2018 28	Clermont	2–1	Reims	Clermont-Ferrand
CET (UTC+1)				Stadium: Stade Gabriel Montpied

9 March 2018 29	Reims	4–0	Châteauroux	Reims
CET (UTC+1)				Stadium: Stade Auguste-Delaune

17 March 2018 30	Reims	3–1	Lens	Reims
CET (UTC+1)				Stadium: Stade Auguste-Delaune

31 March 2018 31	Nancy	0–2	Reims	Tomblaine
CEST (UTC+2)				Stadium: Stade Marcel Picot

14 April 2018 33	Paris FC	0–3	Reims	Paris
CEST (UTC+2)				Stadium: Stade Sébastien Charléty

20 April 2018 34	Reims	1–0	Ajaccio	Reims
CEST (UTC+2)				Stadium: Stade Auguste-Delaune

24 April 2018 35	Auxerre	1–4	Reims	Auxerre
CEST (UTC+2)				Stadium: Stade Abbé-Deschamps

27 April 2018 36	Reims	3–1	Niort	Reims
CEST (UTC+2)				Stadium: Stade Auguste-Delaune

30 April 2018 32	Reims	0–1	Le Havre	Reims
CET (UTC+1)				Stadium: Stade Auguste-Delaune

4 May 2018 37	Valenciennes	1–3	Reims	Valenciennes
CEST (UTC+2)				Stadium: Stade du Hainaut

11 May 2018 38	Reims	2–2	Nîmes	Reims
CEST (UTC+2)				Stadium: Stade Auguste-Delaune

=== Coupe de France ===
12 November 2017 Seventh round	FC Geispolsheim 01	0–2	Reims	Geispolsheim
14:30 CET (UTC+1)			Ngamukol 19'; Siebatcheu 73'	Stadium: Centre Sportif Geispolsheim; Attendance: 2,200; Referee: Thierry Bouille

3 December 2017 Eighth round	Lens	3–2 (a.e.t.)	Reims	Lens
13:45 CET (UTC+1)	Zoubir 32'; Cristian López 101', 115' (pen.)		Ndom 68'; Oudin 110'	Stadium: Stade Bollaert-Delelis; Attendance: 11,542; Referee: Johan Hamel

=== Coupe de la Ligue ===
8 August 2017 First round	Bourg-Péronnas	0–1	Reims	Bourg-en-Bresse
20:00 CEST (UTC+2)				Stadium: Stade Marcel-Verchère; Attendance: 1,425; Referee: William Lavis

22 August 2017 Second round	Valenciennes	3–0	Reims	Valenciennes
21:00 CEST (UTC+2)				Stadium: Stade du Hainaut; Attendance: 4,113; Referee: Sylvain Palhies
