= Rabuel =

Rabuel is a surname. Notable people with the surname include:

- Claude Rabuel (1669–1729), French Jesuit mathematician
- Mattéo Rabuel (born 2000), French footballer
- Nicolas Rabuel (born 1978), French football manager and former player
