= 2022–23 Ligue 2 =

Ligue 2
- Season: 2022–23
- Dates: 30 July 2022 – 5 June 2023
- Champions: Le Havre
- Promoted: Le Havre; Metz
- Relegated: Sochaux; Dijon; Niort; Nîmes
- Matches: 370
- Goals: 890 (2.41 per match)
- Top goalscorer: Georges Mikautadze (23 goals)
- Biggest home win: Saint-Étienne 5–0 Bastia (30 August 2022); Dijon 5–0 Laval (26 December 2022)
- Biggest away win: Saint-Étienne 0–6 Le Havre (20 August 2022)
- Highest scoring: Metz 3–6 Guingamp (12 September 2022); Valenciennes 4–5 Paris (1 April 2023)
- Longest winning run: Sochaux (6 matches)
- Longest unbeaten run: Metz (25 matches)
- Longest winless run: Dijon (10 matches)
- Longest losing run: Sochaux (8 matches)

The 2022–23 Ligue 2, commonly known as 2022–23 Ligue 2 BKT for sponsorship reasons, was the 84th season of Ligue 2. It began on 30 July 2022 and ended on 5 June 2023. The league had a break from 12 November to 27 December due to the FIFA World Cup. Two clubs were to be promoted to Ligue 1 at the end of the season as the number of clubs in Ligue 1 was set to be reduced from 20 to 18 for the 2023–24 season. As a result, there were no play-offs held after the end of the regular season.

== Teams ==
=== Team changes ===
▲ from Championnat National	▲ to Ligue 1	▼ from Ligue 1	▼ to Championnat National
Laval; Annecy	Toulouse; Ajaccio; Auxerre	Saint-Étienne; Metz; Bordeaux	Dunkerque; Nancy

=== Stadiums and locations ===
=
Location of teams in 2022–23 Ligue 2

Club	Location	Venue	Capacity
Amiens	Amiens	Stade de la Licorne	12,097
Annecy	Annecy	Parc des Sports	15,660
Bastia	Bastia	Stade Armand Cesari	16,078
Bordeaux	Bordeaux	Matmut Atlantique	42,115
Caen	Caen	Stade Michel d'Ornano	21,215
Dijon	Dijon	Stade Gaston Gérard	15,995
Grenoble	Grenoble	Stade des Alpes	20,068
Guingamp	Guingamp	Stade de Roudourou	18,378
Laval	Laval	Stade Francis Le Basser	18,607
Le Havre	Le Havre	Stade Océane	25,178
Metz	Longeville-lès-Metz	Stade Saint-Symphorien	25,636
Nîmes	Nîmes	Stade des Costières	18,482
Niort	Niort	Stade René Gaillard	10,886
Paris	Paris	Stade Charléty	19,151
Pau	Pau	Nouste Camp	4,031
Quevilly-Rouen	Rouen	Stade Robert Diochon	12,018
Rodez	Rodez	Stade Paul-Lignon	5,955
Saint-Étienne	Saint-Étienne	Stade Geoffroy-Guichard	42,000
Sochaux	Montbéliard	Stade Auguste Bonal	20,005
Valenciennes	Valenciennes	Stade du Hainaut	25,172

=== Personnel and kits ===
Team	Manager	Captain	Kit manufacturer	Sponsors (front)	Sponsors (back)	Sponsors (sleeve)	Sponsors (shorts)	Sponsors (socks)
Amiens	(France) Patrice Descamps (interim)	(France) Régis Gurtner	Puma	Intersport, Igol Lubrifiants, Gueudet	Igol Lubrifiants	None	Amiens Métropole, E.Leclerc Rivery	None
Annecy	(France) Laurent Guyot	(France) Jean-Jacques Rocchi	Adidas	MSC Cruises, Mediaco Vrac, Sogimm	Annecy, Nissan Groupe Maurin	Tissier Technique	LP Charpente	None
Bastia	(France) Régis Brouard	(France) Christophe Vincent	Adidas	Oscaro Power, Corsica Ferries, Madewis, Roncaglia Blanchisserie, Collectivité de Corse, Olivier Bleu, Smart Good Things	Payfoot, ESSE, Madewis	Coviag	Capembal, Centre Auto JW, JW Rent	None
Bordeaux	(France) David Guion	(France) Yoann Barbet	Adidas	Crédit Mutuel du Sud-Ouest, Groupe Vital	MAT IN BAT, Bistro Régent	Cupra	Vigier Groupe	None
Caen	(France) Stéphane Moulin	(France) Romain Thomas	Kappa	Starwash (H)/Saint James (A), Künkel, Thalazur	Imprimerie NII, Guilloux	Sofrilog	Crédit Agricole Normandie, Printngo Publicité	None
Dijon	(France) Pascal Dupraz	(France) Daniel Congré	Lotto	Groupe Roger Martin, Dijonnaise de Voies Ferrées, Suez	Dijon - Cité internationale de la gastronomie et du vin, LCR	Leader Intérim	Chopard Groupe Automobile, Dalkia	Caisse d'Epargne
Grenoble	(France) Vincent Hognon	(France) Brice Maubleu	Nike	Vinci Immobilier (H)/Carrefour (A), Smart Good Things	SEMPA, Le Cabanon en Provence	None	Groupe ABC, LCR	None
Guingamp	(France) Stéphane Dumont	(France) Jérémy Livolant	Umbro	Celtigel, Creactuel, Breizh Cola, Union d'Experts, Ballay	Jardiman, Vital Concept	Cafés Coïc	Bernard Jarnoux Crêpier, Tibbloc	None
Laval	(France) Olivier Frapolli	(France) Jimmy Roye	Kappa	Lactel, La Mayenne Le Département, Laval Agglo	V and B Cave & Bar, Groupe Lucas, Mayenne	Groupe Actual	Laval Agglo, SEPAL, Aropiz	None
Le Havre	(Slovenia) Luka Elsner	(Algeria) Victor Lekhal	Joma	Siemens Gamesa, SIM Emploi, SOL'S	SOL'S	None	None	None
Metz	(Romania) László Bölöni	(France) Matthieu Udol	Kappa	Car Avenue (H), MOSL Mosselle Sans Limite, Malezieux, Axia Interim	Technitoit, Nacon	Eurométropole de Metz	E.Leclerc Moselle, LCR	None
Nîmes	(France) Frédéric Bompard	(France) Benoît Poulain	Kipsta	Bastide Médical, Nîmes	Decathlon Nîmes	Carré Sud	Nîmes Métropole	None
Niort	(France) Bernard Simondi	(Burkina Faso) Charles Kaboré	Kappa	Cheminées Poujoulat, Solnet (H)/Open Energie (A)	Niort Agglo	None	None	None
Paris	(France) Thierry Laurey	(Martinique) Cyril Mandouki	Adidas	Bahrain Victorious, Lycamobile, Bpifrance	Vinci	None	VBET	None
Pau	(France) Didier Tholot	(France) Antoine Batisse	Puma	Mansion Sports, Iroise Bellevie, Pau, Casino de Pau, Intersport	Arobase Intérim, Brico Fenêtre	BulluxServices	Übi Care, Mansion Sports	None
Quevilly-Rouen	(France) Olivier Echouafni	(France) Alexandre Bonnet	Kappa	Matmut, SATEB, Métropole Rouen Normandie, TPR, Intersport	Maisons France Confort	None	Volkswagen Blet	None
Rodez	(France) Didier Santini	(France) Rémy Boissier	Adidas	Maxoutil, E.Leclerc	JeanStation, Thermatic, Ville de Rodez, Aveyron, Rodez Agglomération, Occitanie	aveyron.fr	Intersport, Maxoutil	None
Saint-Étienne	(France) Laurent Batlles	(France) Anthony Briançon	Hummel	Smart Good Things, Loire, BYmyCAR, Atrihome	Saint-Étienne La Métropole, ZEbet	Kelyps Intérim	Aésio Mutuelle, Desjoyaux	None
Sochaux	(France) Pierre-Alain Frau (interim)	(France) Gaëtan Weissbeck	Nike	Nedey Automobiles, Région Bourgogne-Franche-Comté, Crédit Agricole Franche-Comté	Pays de Montbéliard Agglomération	Néolia	idverde, Doubs	None
Valenciennes	(Morocco) Ahmed Kantari (interim)	(France) Mathieu Debuchy	Acerbis	F&VL (H)/TSR (A & 3), Ford, Groupe Dhollande, Spefinox	TSR (H)/F&VL (A & 3)	Match Worn Shirt	LCR, OCAD	None

== Managerial changes ==
Team	Outgoing manager	Manner of departure	Date of vacancy	Position in table	Incoming manager	Date of appointment
Dijon	(France) Patrice Garande	Mutual consent	14 May 2022	Pre-season	(Senegal) Omar Daf	17 June 2022
Valenciennes	(France) Christophe Delmotte	Returned to first-team duties	20 May 2022	Pre-season	(France) Nicolas Rabuel	3 June 2022
Quevilly-Rouen	(France) Fabien Mercadal	Resigned	30 May 2022	Pre-season	(France) Olivier Echouafni	8 June 2022
Saint-Étienne	(France) Pascal Dupraz	End of contract	2 June 2022	Pre-season	(France) Laurent Batlles	3 June 2022
FC Metz	(France) Frédéric Antonetti	Mutual consent	7 June 2022	Pre-season	(Romania) László Bölöni	16 June 2022
Le Havre	(France) Paul Le Guen	Sacked	16 June 2022	Pre-season	(Slovenia) Luka Elsner	20 June 2022
Sochaux	(Senegal) Omar Daf	Signed by Dijon FCO	17 June 2022	Pre-season	(France) Olivier Guégan	25 June 2022
Niort	(France) Sébastien Desabre	Signed by DR Congo	7 August 2022	11th	(Cameroon) Andé Dona Ndoh (interim)	5 July 2022
Niort	(Cameroon) Andé Dona Ndoh	End of interim spell	4 September 2022	16th	(Portugal) Rui Almeida	4 September 2022
Rodez	(France) Laurent Peyrelade	Sacked	8 November 2022	18th	(France) Emmerick Darbelet (interim)	8 November 2022
Nîmes	(France) Nicolas Usaï	Mutual consent	16 November 2022	17th	(France) Frédéric Bompard	21 November 2022
Rodez	(France) Emmerick Darbelet	End of interim spell	28 November 2022	18th	(France) Didier Santini	28 November 2022
Niort	(Portugal) Rui Almeida	Mutual consent	1 February 2023	20th	(Benin) Oumar Tchomogo (interim)	2 February 2023
Niort	(Benin) Oumar Tchomogo	End of interim duties	9 March 2023	20th	(France) Bernard Simondi	9 March 2023
Dijon	(Senegal) Omar Daf	Sacked	3 April 2023	19th	(France) Pascal Dupraz	3 April 2023
Amiens	(France) Philippe Hinschberger	Sacked	3 April 2023	11th	(France) Patrice Descamps (interim)	3 April 2023
Valenciennes	(France) Nicolas Rabuel	Sacked	13 April 2023	16th	(Morocco) Ahmed Kantari (interim)	13 April 2023
Sochaux	(France) Olivier Guégan	Sacked	17 May 2023	6th	(France) Pierre-Alain Frau (interim)	17 May 2023

== League table ==
Pos	Team	Pld	W	D	L	GF	GA	GD	Pts	Promotion or Relegation
1	Le Havre (C, P)	38	20	15	3	46	19	+27	75	Promotion to Ligue 1
2	Metz (P)	38	20	12	6	61	33	+28	72	Promotion to Ligue 1
3	Bordeaux	38	20	9	9	51	28	+23	69	
4	Bastia	38	17	9	12	52	45	+7	60	
5	Caen	38	16	11	11	52	43	+9	59	
6	Guingamp	38	15	10	13	51	46	+5	55	
7	Paris FC	38	15	10	13	45	43	+2	55	
8	Saint-Étienne	38	15	11	12	63	57	+6	53 (Note: Saint-Étienne were deducted three points for a pitch invasion during their relegation play-off the previous season.)	
9	Sochaux (D, R)	38	15	7	16	54	41	+13	52	Relegation to Championnat National
10	Grenoble	38	14	9	15	33	36	−3	51	
11	Quevilly-Rouen	38	12	14	12	47	49	−2	50	
12	Amiens	38	13	8	17	40	52	−12	47	
13	Pau	38	12	11	15	40	52	−12	47	
14	Rodez	38	11	13	14	39	44	−5	46	
15	Laval	38	14	4	20	44	56	−12	46	
16	Valenciennes	38	10	15	13	42	49	−7	45	
17	Annecy	38	11	12	15	39	51	−12	45	Spared from relegation
18	Dijon (R)	38	10	12	16	38	43	−5	42	Relegation to Championnat National
19	Nîmes (R)	38	10	6	22	44	62	−18	36	Relegation to Championnat National
20	Niort (R)	38	7	8	23	35	67	−32	29	Relegation to Championnat National

Source: Ligue 2
Rules for classification: 1) Points; 2) Goal difference; 3) Number of goals scored; 4) Head-to-head goal difference; 5) Fair play points
(C) Champions; (D) Disqualified; (P) Promoted; (R) Relegated

=== Positions by round ===
The table lists the positions of teams after each week of matches. In order to preserve chronological evolvements, any postponed matches are not included to the round at which they were originally scheduled, but added to the full round they were played immediately afterwards.

Team ╲ Round	1	2	3	4	5	6	7	8	9	10	11	12	13	14	15	16	17	18	19	20	21	22	23	24	25	26	27	28	29	30	31	32	33	34	35	36	37	38
Le Havre	7	15	15	10	10	8	4	2	2	4	3	2	2	1	1	1	1	1	1	1	1	1	1	1	1	1	1	1	1	1	1	1	1	1	1	1	1	1
Metz	2	8	5	5	7	5	7	8	10	9	10	11	12	11	8	10	6	4	3	4	5	4	4	4	4	4	4	4	3	4	3	3	3	3	3	3	2	2
Bordeaux	12	3	2	3	5	2	1	4	3	1	1	1	1	2	2	3	2	2	2	2	3	3	3	2	2	2	2	2	2	2	2	2	2	2	2	2	3	3
Bastia	17	9	4	8	11	15	11	11	8	7	9	9	9	12	14	13	11	11	7	5	4	6	7	8	8	5	5	5	5	5	5	6	4	4	4	4	4	4
Caen	6	2	3	1	1	1	5	3	6	8	6	8	7	7	5	7	7	8	9	8	8	8	8	6	5	6	7	6	6	7	6	5	6	6	5	5	5	5
Sochaux	9	16	17	14	6	6	3	1	1	3	4	3	3	4	3	2	3	3	4	3	2	2	2	3	3	3	3	3	4	3	4	4	5	5	6	6	6	9
Guingamp	1	1	1	7	3	7	9	6	5	5	7	7	8	8	11	8	12	12	13	10	11	13	11	11	12	11	10	9	10	12	10	11	9	11	9	10	7	6
Paris FC	14	5	9	11	13	11	13	10	12	10	11	10	10	9	12	9	10	7	8	11	13	12	10	12	9	10	9	10	8	9	11	9	10	9	10	7	8	7
Grenoble	13	7	12	13	15	10	10	13	9	11	8	6	5	3	4	4	5	6	5	7	7	5	5	5	7	8	6	7	7	6	7	7	7	7	7	8	9	10
Saint-Étienne	20	20	20	20	20	19	19	15	18	18	18	19	18	19	20	20	20	20	20	19	19	18	16	15	15	14	13	12	12	11	9	10	11	10	11	9	10	8
Quevilly-Rouen	10	14	14	16	12	14	15	17	19	15	12	12	13	15	13	11	8	9	10	9	10	9	6	7	6	7	8	8	9	8	8	8	8	8	8	11	11	11
Amiens	18	12	7	2	4	4	2	5	4	2	2	4	4	6	7	6	4	5	6	6	6	7	9	9	10	9	11	11	11	10	12	14	13	12	12	12	12	12
Valenciennes	8	6	11	12	14	9	6	7	7	6	5	5	6	5	6	5	9	10	11	12	15	10	13	14	13	13	12	14	14	16	16	15	15	15	17	14	13	16
Annecy	15	19	19	19	18	17	17	12	15	17	13	16	16	14	15	15	14	14	12	13	9	11	12	10	11	12	14	13	15	13	15	16	16	16	15	15	14	17
Pau	19	18	16	18	19	20	20	19	14	16	16	13	11	10	9	12	13	13	15	15	14	15	15	16	16	16	16	15	16	15	14	13	14	14	14	17	15	13
Rodez	11	17	18	17	17	18	18	20	16	14	15	17	17	18	18	18	17	16	17	17	18	19	20	20	20	18	17	16	13	14	13	12	12	13	13	13	16	15
Laval	3	10	6	6	8	12	14	16	13	13	17	14	14	13	10	14	15	15	14	14	12	14	14	13	14	15	15	17	17	17	17	17	18	17	16	18	17	14
Dijon	5	4	8	4	2	3	8	9	11	12	14	15	15	17	17	16	16	17	16	16	17	17	19	19	17	17	18	18	19	18	18	18	17	18	18	16	18	18
Nîmes	16	13	10	15	9	13	12	14	17	19	19	18	19	16	16	17	18	19	19	18	16	16	17	17	18	19	19	19	18	19	19	19	19	19	19	19	19	19
Niort	4	11	13	9	16	16	16	18	20	20	20	20	20	20	19	19	19	18	18	20	20	20	18	18	19	20	20	20	20	20	20	20	20	20	20	20	20	20

Leader and promotion to Ligue 1
Promotion to Ligue 1
Relegation to Championnat National

Source: Ligue 2

== Results ==
Home \ Away	AMI	ANN	BAS	BOR	CAE	DIJ	GRE	GUI	LAV	HAC	MET	NIM	NIO	QUE	PFC	PAU	ROD	STE	SOC	VAL
Amiens	—	1–0	3–1	1–2	1–3	2–1	1–0	1–1	1–2	1–1	0–2	1–0	3–0	0–2	1–1	1–0	1–3	0–1	1–0	0–2
Annecy	2–0	—	0–2	1–0	2–0	1–1	0–0	1–1	0–1	1–0	0–3	0–0	1–2	1–0	2–0	0–2	0–3	2–1	2–1	2–1
Bastia	1–1	3–0	—	1–1	1–0	1–0	3–0	1–1	0–2	1–1	1–0	4–2	2–1	0–1	0–1	1–0	0–2	2–0	3–2	1–0
Bordeaux	1–1	1–0	2–0	—	1–0	2–1	3–0	0–1	3–0	1–2	2–0	1–0	1–0	4–0	2–1	1–1	0–1 (Note: The Bordeaux v Rodez match was abandoned in the first half after a Bordeaux supporter entered the pitch and shoved Rodez player Lucas Buádes, who fell to the ground. On 12 June, following an investigation, the LFP ruled the result before the match was suspended to stand and gave a one-point deduction for Bordeaux at the beginning of the 2023–24 season.)	1–1	2–1	0–0
Caen	3–1	0–0	3–1	2–2	—	2–1	2–1	4–1	0–0	1–2	1–0	4–2	1–0	0–1	3–1	1–1	2–0	2–2	0–0	2–1
Dijon	3–0	0–2	1–1	0–3	2–2	—	1–0	1–1	5–0	0–0	0–0	2–1	0–1	0–0	1–1	0–1	1–0	2–1	0–2	2–1
Grenoble	2–1	2–1	0–1	0–0	1–0	0–0	—	0–2	3–2	0–0	0–1	3–2	2–0	1–0	1–2	1–1	1–1	0–2	1–0	1–0
Guingamp	3–1	0–4	1–1	0–1	1–2	2–0	2–4	—	3–1	0–1	1–1	1–2	2–0	0–2	0–0	4–0	0–0	2–1	1–2	3–1
Laval	0–3	1–1	2–1	1–2	4–0	1–0	0–1	1–2	—	1–3	3–3	2–0	2–1	0–1	1–2	0–1	3–1	2–1	2–1	1–0
Le Havre	1–1	2–0	3–0	1–0	2–1	1–0	0–0	0–0	2–1	—	2–0	3–1	1–0	0–0	0–0	1–1	1–0	2–2	1–0	0–2
Metz	3–0	0–0	3–2	3–0	0–0	1–2	1–0	3–6	1–0	1–1	—	2–0	0–0	2–0	1–1	1–0	1–1	3–2	0–0	2–0
Nîmes	2–0	4–0	0–0	1–0	0–1	1–2	0–2	1–2	1–0	0–1	1–4	—	3–2	2–0	0–1	3–2	1–0	1–2	3–1	3–3
Niort	1–3	2–2	1–4	3–1	1–2	2–1	0–3	0–0	3–2	0–1	1–3	1–1	—	3–3	2–1	2–1	2–3	0–1	0–3	0–1
Quevilly-Rouen	1–3	2–2	1–1	0–0	2–1	2–2	2–0	2–0	1–3	0–1	1–2	3–1	3–3	—	3–1	2–1	0–0	2–2	0–0	1–1
Paris FC	3–0	1–0	0–1	1–3	1–1	2–1	1–0	1–2	0–0	0–0	1–4	3–0	3–0	2–1	—	0–1	1–2	2–4	2–1	0–1
Pau	2–1	2–2	2–6	0–2	1–0	0–0	0–0	2–1	0–1	0–1	1–1	1–0	1–0	3–4	0–1	—	2–2	2–2	0–3	1–0
Rodez	0–1	2–2	0–2	0–3	3–2	2–1	0–1	0–1	1–0	1–1	1–4	1–1	1–1	1–0	0–0	2–3	—	1–1	1–2	1–1
Saint-Étienne	1–1	3–2	5–0	2–0	1–1	2–0	2–2	3–2	1–0	0–6	1–3	1–1	2–0	4–2	0–2	2–0	0–2	—	2–3	2–0
Sochaux	0–1	5–1	1–0	1–1	1–2	0–2	1–0	0–1	4–1	1–1	0–1	3–1	3–0	2–2	0–0	2–3	1–0	2–1	—	4–0
Valenciennes	1–1	2–2	2–2	0–2	1–1	2–2	1–0	1–0	3–1	1–0	1–1	3–2	0–0	0–0	4–5	1–1	0–0	2–2	2–1	—

Source: Ligue 2
Legend: Blue = home team win; Yellow = draw; Red = away team win.

== Season statistics ==
=== Top goalscorers ===
Rank	Player	Club	Goals
1	(Georgia (country)) Georges Mikautadze	Metz	23
2	(Guinea-Bissau) Alexandre Mendy	Caen	19
3	(Ivory Coast) Jean-Philippe Krasso	Saint-Étienne	17
4	(Nigeria) Josh Maja	Bordeaux	16
5	(Guinea) Morgan Guilavogui	Paris FC	15
5	(Ivory Coast) Moïse Sahi	Annecy	15
7	(France) Frank Magri	Bastia	13
7	(Mali) Ibrahim Sissoko	Sochaux	13
7	(France) Malik Tchokounté	Nîmes	13
10	(France) Mickaël Le Bihan	Dijon	12
10	(Senegal) Ibrahima Wadji	Saint-Étienne	12

== Attendances ==
#	Football club	Home games	Average attendance
1	Girondins de Bordeaux	19	21,810
2	AS Saint-Étienne	19	17,436
3	FC Metz	19	14,970
4	SM Caen	19	13,799
5	Havre AC	19	12,501
6	FC Sochaux	19	11,969
7	SC Bastia	19	9,941
8	EA Guingamp	19	8,838
9	Valenciennes FC	19	7,928
10	Amiens SC	19	7,561
11	Dijon FCO	19	7,540
12	Stade lavallois	19	7,123
13	FC Annecy	19	6,832
14	Grenoble Foot 38	19	5,640
15	Paris FC	19	4,030
16	US Quevilly-Rouen	19	3,786
17	Pau FC	19	3,104
18	Nîmes Olympique	19	2,774
19	Chamois niortais	19	2,576
20	Rodez AF	19	2,218
