= Franck L'Hostis =

French footballer (born 1990)

Personal information
- Date of birth: 3 April 1990 (age 36)
- Place of birth: Nîmes, France
- Height: 1.86 m (6 ft 1 in)
- Position: Goalkeeper

Team information
- Current team: Stade Briochin
- Number: 30

Youth career
- 1997–2000: SC Manduellois
- 2000–2001: Nîmes
- 2001–2008: Stade Beaucairois
- 2008: Arles-Avignon
- 2008–2010: Monaco

Senior career*
| Years | Team | Apps | (Gls) |
| 2010–2011 | Monaco B | 25 | (0) |
| 2010–2012 | Monaco | 0 | (0) |
| 2011–2012 | → Martigues (loan) | 28 | (0) |
| 2012–2014 | Amiens | 70 | (0) |
| 2014–2017 | Clermont | 10 | (0) |
| 2014–2016 | Clermont B | 17 | (0) |
| 2017–2020 | Le Puy | 75 | (0) |
| 2020–2022 | Orléans | 68 | (0) |
| 2022–2023 | Bourg-en-Bresse | 34 | (0) |
| 2023– | Stade Briochin | 88 | (0) |
- * Club domestic league appearances and goals as of 23 June 2026

Franck L'Hostis (born 3 April 1990) is a French professional footballer who plays as a goalkeeper for Championnat National club Stade Briochin.

== Career ==
A youth product of Monaco, L'Hostis gained first-team playing time on loan at Martigues for the 2011–12 season. He then spent two years as first-choice goalkeeper at Amiens, before joining Clermont in July 2014. He made his full professional debut a few weeks later, in a 2–1 Ligue 2 defeat against Brest.

L'Hostis signed for Le Puy in the summer of 2017, and played there for three seasons, before moving to Orléans in June 2020. In 2022, he signed for Bourg-en-Bresse.

== Honours ==
Individual

- Toulon Tournament Best Goalkeeper: 2011
