= Ibrahim Sacko =

French footballer (born 1993)

Ibrahima Sacko
Personal information
- Date of birth: 24 May 1993 (age 33)
- Place of birth: Meulan, France
- Height: 1.72 m (5 ft 8 in)
- Position: Midfielder

Youth career
- 2001–2004: ASO Mureaux
- 2004–2009: Les Mureaux
- 2009–2011: Brest
- 2011–2014: Valenciennes

Senior career*
Years	Team	Apps	(Gls)
2011–2014	Valenciennes	0	(0)
2014–2015	Entente SSG	24	(1)
2015–2017	Boulogne	36	(1)
2017–2018	GS Consolat	25	(1)
2018–2020	Bourg-en-Bresse	50	(1)
2020–2023	Fréjus Saint-Raphaël	56	(2)
2023–2024	Nîmes	18	(0)
- * Club domestic league appearances and goals as of 17 June 2024

Ibrahima Sacko (born 24 May 1993) is a French professional footballer who plays as a midfielder.

== Career ==
Born in Meulan, Sacko played at U17 and U19 level with Brest. He left Brest in the summer of 2011, signing a contra stagiare-professional (trainee-professional contract) with Valenciennes. He made his senior debut (and only appearance) with Valenciennes on 31 August 2011, appearing as a substitute in a 3–2 defeat to Dijon in the Coupe de la Ligue.

In June 2014 Sacko signed for Championnat de France Amateur (fourth tier) side L'Entente SSG. The following season he was one of 16 new players signed by US Boulogne, moving up a division to play in Championnat National.

Despite interest from Ligue 2 clubs, Sacko remained in the third tier with GS Consolat, signing at the end of June 2017. The Marseille team suffered relegation at the end of the season, and Sacko remained at the same level with Bourg-Péronnas.

Sacko was one of a large group of players leaving Bourg-Péronnas at the end of the shortened 2019–20 season, signing for Étoile Fréjus Saint-Raphaël in Championnat National 2.

On 1 August 2023, Sacko signed with Nîmes for one season.

== Career statistics ==
As of 10 October 2020

Appearances and goals by club, season and competition
Club	Season	League			Coupe de France		Coupe de la Ligue		Total	
Club	Season	Division	Apps	Goals	Apps	Goals	Apps	Goals	Apps	Goals
Valenciennes	Ligue 1	2011–12	0	0	0	0	1	0	1	0
Valenciennes B	CFA	2011–12	25	1	—		—		25	1
Valenciennes B	CFA	2012–13	26	0	—		—		26	0
Valenciennes B	Total		51	1	0	0	0	0	51	1
Entente SSG	CFA	2014–15	24	1	0	0	0	0	24	1
Boulogne	National	2015–16	13	0	2	0	0	0	15	0
Boulogne	National	2016–17	23	1	0	0	0	0	23	1
Boulogne	Total		36	1	2	0	0	0	38	1
Boulogne B	CFA 2	2015–16	10	2	—		—		10	2
Boulogne B	CFA 2	2016–17	3	2	—		—		3	2
Boulogne B	Total		13	4	0	0	0	0	13	4
GS Consolat	National	2017–18	25	1	1	0	0	0	26	1
Bourg-Péronnas	National	2018–19	33	1	1	0	1	0	35	1
Bourg-Péronnas	National	2019–20	17	0	3	1	4	0	24	1
Bourg-Péronnas	Total		50	1	4	1	5	0	59	2
Fréjus Saint-Raphaël	National 2	2020–21	8	0	0	0	—		8	0
Career total			207	9	7	1	6	0	220	10
