= Hendrick Cakin =

French footballer (born 1992)

Personal information
- Full name: Hendrick Cakin
- Date of birth: 6 January 1992 (age 34)
- Place of birth: Sarcelles, France
- Height: 1.78 m (5 ft 10 in)
- Position: Right-back

Team information
- Current team: Saint-Brice FC

Youth career
- 2008–2013: Toulouse

Senior career*
Years	Team	Apps	(Gls)
2014–2015	Vannes	14	(2)
2016–2017	Nantes II	22	(0)
2017–2018	Reims II	14	(0)
2018	Reims	1	(0)
2020–	Saint-Brice FC		
- * Club domestic league appearances and goals as of 00:40, 3 February 2019 (UTC) ‡ National team caps and goals as of 11 May 2018

Hendrick Cakin (born 6 January 1992) is a French professional footballer, who plays as a right-back for Saint-Brice FC.

== Professional career ==
A youth academy product of Toulouse FC, Cakin was let go in his final academy year and found himself without a club. After a year of trialing with different teams, he found himself at Vannes in the Championnat National. Unfortunately, he heavily damaged his knee and after surgery spent another year out of action. He came back to football with the reserve side of FC Nantes, and after a successful season moved to Stade de Reims on 28 June 2017. Cakin made his professional debut for Reims in a 1–0 Coupe de la Ligue win over Football Bourg-en-Bresse Péronnas 01 on 8 August 2017, at the age of 25.

Cakin made his league debut for Reims in a 3–0 Ligue 2 win over Paris FC on 14 April 2018. Cakin helped Stade de Reims win the 2017–18 Ligue 2, helping promote them to the Ligue 1 for the 2018–19 season.

In February 2020, Cakin joined French amateur club Saint-Brice FC.

== Personal life ==
Cakin was born in Sarcelles and is of Guadeloupean and Martiniquais descent.

== Honours ==
Reims

- Ligue 2 (1): 2017–18
