= Grégory Coelho =

French footballer (born 1999)

Personal information
- Date of birth: 2 September 1999 (age 27)
- Place of birth: Cahors, France
- Height: 1.80 m (5 ft 11 in)
- Position: Right-back

Team information
- Current team: Bourg-Péronnas

Youth career
- 2010–2016: Cahors FC
- 2016–2018: Castelmaurou FC

Senior career*
Years	Team	Apps	(Gls)
2018–2025	Rodez B	45	(1)
2019–	Rodez	18	(0)
2021	→ Sète (loan)	5	(0)
2023	→ Borgo (loan)	16	(0)
2025	→ Balagne (loan)	15	(0)
2025–2026	Blois	30	(2)
2026–	Bourg-Péronnas	0	(0)
- * Club domestic league appearances and goals as of 16 May 2026

Grégory Coelho (born 2 September 1999) is a French professional footballer who plays as a right-back for Ligue 3 club Bourg-Péronnas.

== Career ==
Coelho is a youth product of the academies of Cahors FC and Castelmaurou FC, before moving to Rodez AF. He debuted with Rodez's reserves in the Championnat National 3 in 2018. He made his professional debut for Rodez in a 2–1 Ligue 2 win over Caen on 13 December 2019. He signed his first professional contract with Rodez on 3 June 2020. On 3 August 2021, he joined Sète on loan for the 2021–22 season. On 22 June 2022, he extends his contract with Rodez Af. On 29 January 2023, Coelho was loaned to Borgo. On 22 January 2025, Gregory Coelho was loaned to Fc Balagne. On 7 July 2025, Coelho signed with Blois Football 41. In July 2026, He signed with Bourg en Bresse Péronnas 01 and he play in professional League 3.

== Personal life ==
Born in France, Coelho is of Cape Verdean, Portuguese and Congolese descent.
