= Florent Perradin =

French footballer (born 1992)

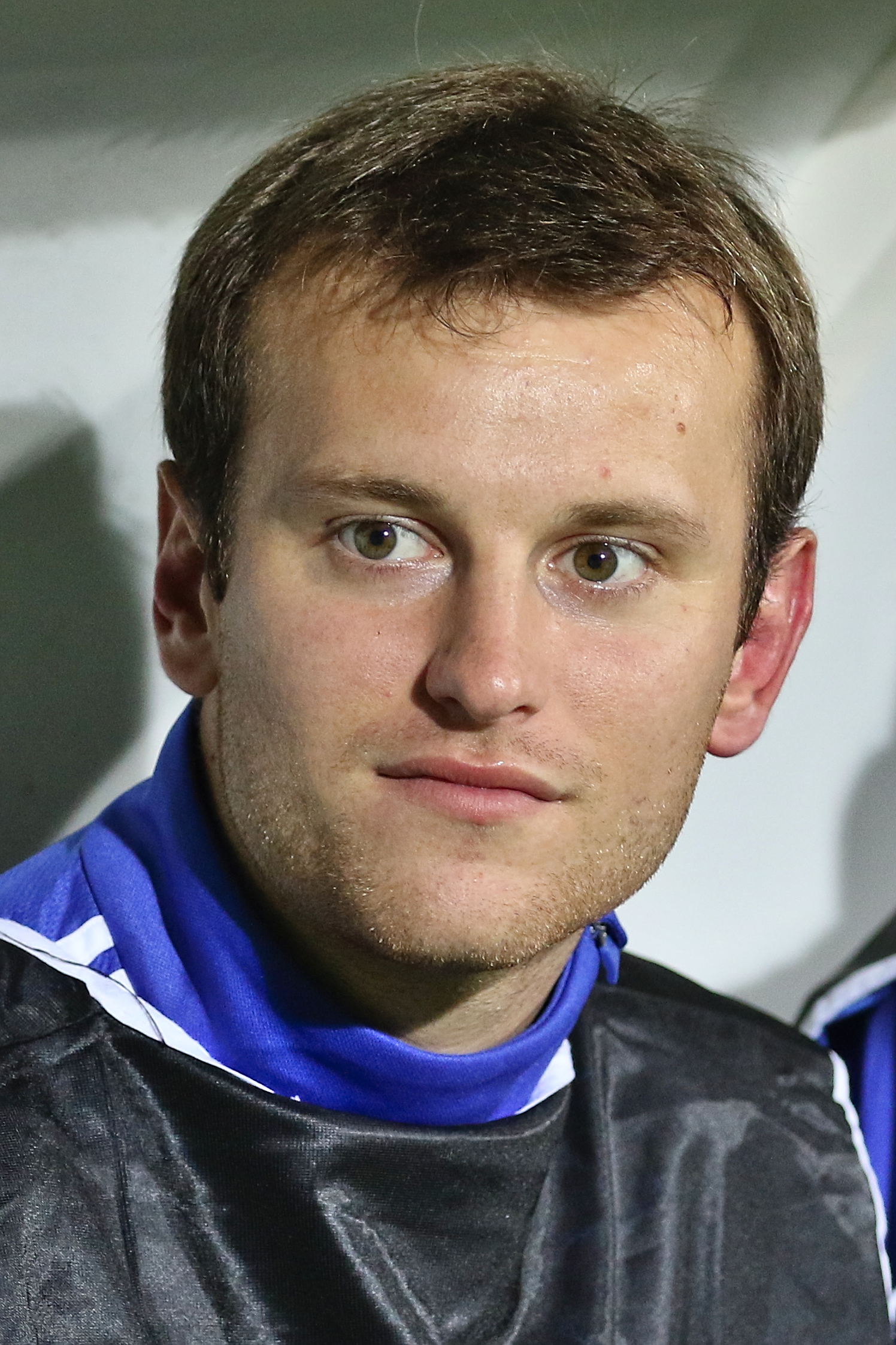
- Perradin in 2015

Personal information
- Date of birth: 11 May 1992 (age 34)
- Place of birth: Lyon, France
- Height: 1.79 m (5 ft 10 in)
- Position: Defender

Team information
- Current team: Louhans-Cuiseaux FC

Youth career
- –2010: Lyon

Senior career*
Years	Team	Apps	(Gls)
2010–2021	Bourg-Péronnas	194	(4)
2021–2024	Mâcon	40 (Note: Statistics unknown for the 2021–22 season.)	(0+)
2024–	Louhans-Cuiseaux FC	3	(0)
- * Club domestic league appearances and goals as of 22:41, 16 October 2024 (UTC)

Florent Perradin (born 11 May 1992) is a French professional footballer who plays as a defender for Championnat National 3 club Louhans-Cuiseaux FC.

== Career ==
On 16 June 2021, after 11 years with Bourg-Péronnas, Perradin left the club to join lower-league side Mâcon.

== Career statistics ==
As of 1 July 2021

Appearances and goals by club, season and competition
Club	Season	League			Coupe de France		Coupe de la Ligue		Total	
Club	Season	Division	Apps	Goals	Apps	Goals	Apps	Goals	Apps	Goals
Bourg-Péronnas	2010–11	CFA Group B	19	0	0	0	0	0	19	0
Bourg-Péronnas	2011–12	CFA Group B	32	1	4	0	0	0	36	1
Bourg-Péronnas	2012–13	National	31	0	3	0	0	0	34	0
Bourg-Péronnas	2013–14	National	2	0	0	0	0	0	2	0
Bourg-Péronnas	2014–15	National	15	0	0	0	0	0	15	0
Bourg-Péronnas	2015–16	Ligue 2	15	1	2	0	3	0	20	1
Bourg-Péronnas	2016–17	Ligue 2	20	0	1	0	0	0	21	0
Bourg-Péronnas	2017–18	Ligue 2	12	2	0	0	1	0	13	2
Bourg-Péronnas	2018–19	National	17	0	0	0	1	0	18	0
Bourg-Péronnas	2019–20	National	9	0	0	0	3	0	12	0
Bourg-Péronnas	2020–21	National	22	0	0	0	0	0	22	0
Bourg-Péronnas	Total		194	4	10	0	8	0	212	4
