= Stade Briochin =

Football club based in Saint-Brieuc, France

- Full name: Stade Briochin
- Nickname: Les Griffons
- Founded: 1904; 122 years ago
- Ground: Stade Fred-Aubert
- Capacity: 11,000 (3,500 seated)
- Chairman: Guillaume Allanou
- Coach: Guillaume Allanou
- League: Championnat National 1
- 2025–26: Championnat National, 17th of 17 (relegated)
- Website: https://www.stadebriochin.com
Home colours	Away colours

Stade Briochin (French: Stade briochin; French: [stad bʁijɔʃɛ̃]) is a French football club based in Saint-Brieuc, Brittany. As of the 2026–27 season, the club plays in the Championnat National 1, the fourth tier in the French football league system. Home matches are played at the Stade Fred-Aubert in Saint-Brieuc, which can hold up to 11,000 fans.

Founded in 1904, Stade Briochin has played for the majority of its existence at the amateur levels of the French football league system, but did spend three seasons in the second tier of the professional league during the period 1993–1997, before suffering liquidation and an enforced relegation to the fifth tier.

== History ==
Until 1959, Stade Briochin competed in the Ligue de Bretagne, the regional amateur league of Brittany. For five of the next ten years they contested the Championnat de France Amateur, which at the time was the top tier of Amateur football. They competed around this level, as the French football league system restructured itself, until 1988 when they were relegated from the Ligue de Bretagne Division Honneur (the fifth tier, in effect, at this stage) to the Ligue de Bretagne Division Supérieure Régionale.

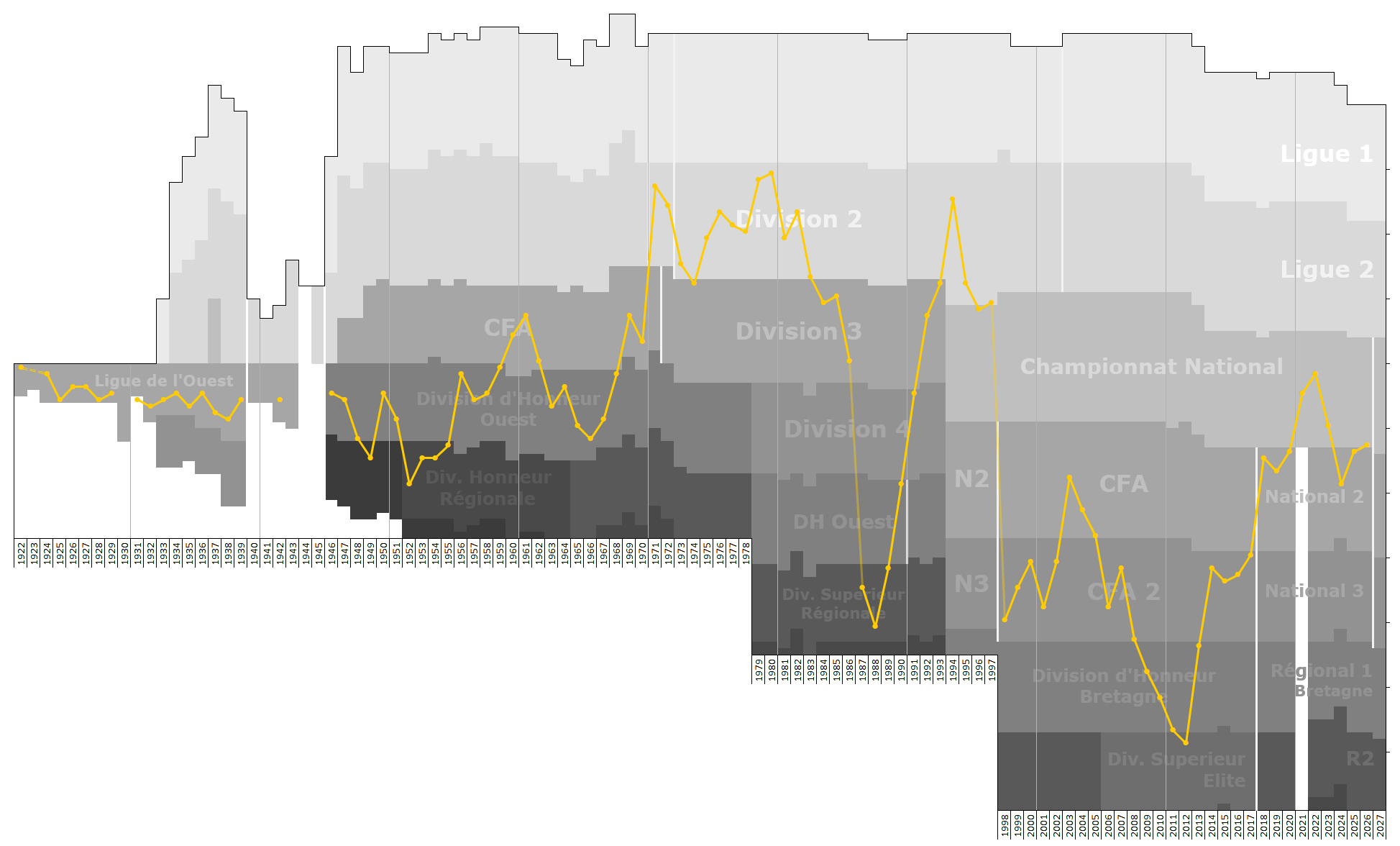
Historical league performance chart of Stade Briochin

From the 1988–89 season, the club won promotions in three out of four seasons, and in 1993–94 they finished 6th in Division 2, which is still their highest finish to date.

In the 1996–97 season, the club started to suffer from debt issues, and on 24 March 1997 they were liquidated by order of court and administratively relegated from the professional football league.

The club restarted in Championnat de France Amateur 2 for the 1997–98 season, falling to the Ligue de Bretagne Division Honneur (now the sixth tier) in 2008 and further to the Ligue de Bretagne Division Supérieure Élite (seventh tier) in 2011. Successive promotions in 2012 and 2013 brought the club back to CFA 2.

In the 2019–2020 season they won promotion to the Championnat National by being top of the Championnat National 2 Group B table when the season was curtailed due to the COVID-19 pandemic.

In the 2024–25 Coupe de France, Stade Briochin eliminated three professional clubs in a row, starting with Le Havre in the round of 64 (1–0), Annecy in the round of 32 (1–1, 4–3 on penalties), and Nice in the round of 16 (2–1). Their run ended in a home tie against Paris Saint-Germain in the quarter-finals, losing 7–0. At the end of the 2025–26 Championnat National season, Stade Briochin suffered relegation back to the fourth tier.

== Current squad ==
As of 24 January 2026

Note: Flags indicate national team as defined under FIFA eligibility rules; some limited exceptions apply. Players may hold more than one non-FIFA nationality.

No.	Pos.	Nation	Player
1	GK	FRA	Estéban Crespel
2	DF	SEN	Youssoupha Ndiaye
3	DF	FRA	Léo Rouillé
4	DF	CIV	Benjamin Angoua
5	DF	FRA	Hugo Boudin
6	MF	FRA	Guillaume Beghin
7	MF	FRA	Artur Zakharyan
8	DF	MLI	Madigoundo Diakité
9	FW	FRA	Aimeric Gomis
10	MF	FRA	Léo Yobé
11	FW	FRA	Stan Janno
13	DF	FRA	Abdoul Diaby Malick
14	MF	SEN	Pierre Dorival (on loan from Lyon)

No.	Pos.	Nation	Player
16	GK	SEN	Dialy Ndiaye
17	MF	FRA	Boubacar Diakhaby
18	DF	FRA	Mattéo Rabuel
19	MF	FRA	Mathias Lopes
21	FW	FRA	Michaël Faty
22	MF	MAR	Karim Achahbar
24	FW	FRA	Sadia Diakhabi
25	DF	FRA	Julien Benhaim
26	FW	FRA	Hicham Benkaid
29	FW	ITA	Christian Konan
30	GK	FRA	Franck L'Hostis
33	MF	FRA	Florian Beurel

== Notable players ==
- (France) Jérémy Le Douaron

== Honours ==
=== Professional Competition ===
- Championnat National: Champions (Group A) 1996

=== National Amateur Competition ===
- Division 3: Champions (West Group) 1993
- Division 4: Champions (Group D) 1991
- Championnat de France Amateur 2: 2017

=== Regional Amateur Competition ===
- Division Honneur (Ligue de l'Ouest) 1959, 1968, 1974, 1990
- Division Honneur (Brittany): 2013
