= Julien Benhaim =

French footballer (born 1996)

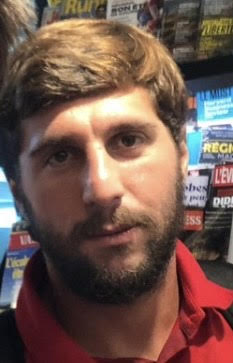
- Benhaim in 2023

Personal information
- Full name: Julien Benhaim-Casanova
- Date of birth: 25 October 1996 (age 30)
- Place of birth: Bastia, France
- Height: 1.68 m (5 ft 6 in)
- Position: Midfielder

Team information
- Current team: Stade Briochin
- Number: 25

Youth career
- Bastia

Senior career*
Years	Team	Apps	(Gls)
2016–2018	Bastia	23	(6)
2017	→ Engordany (loan)	11	(6)
2018–2019	Marignane	25	(3)
2019–2020	Furiani-Agliani	9	(2)
2020	Club San José		
2020–2021	Béziers	9	(0)
2021–2023	Stade Briochin	49	(0)
2022	Stade Briochin B	1	(0)
2023–2024	Ajaccio	8	(0)
2024–	Stade Briochin	22	(0)
- * Club domestic league appearances and goals as of 23 June 2026

Julien Benhaim-Casanova (born 25 October 1996) is a French professional footballer who plays as a midfielder for Championnat National club Stade Briochin.

== Career ==
Benhaim made one Coupe de France appearance for Bastia, while they were in Ligue 1 in 2014–15.

In 2020, Benhaim signed for Club San José in Bolivia.

In June 2021, Benhaim signed with Championnat National side Stade Briochin.
