= Guillaume Beghin =

French professional footballer (born 1997)

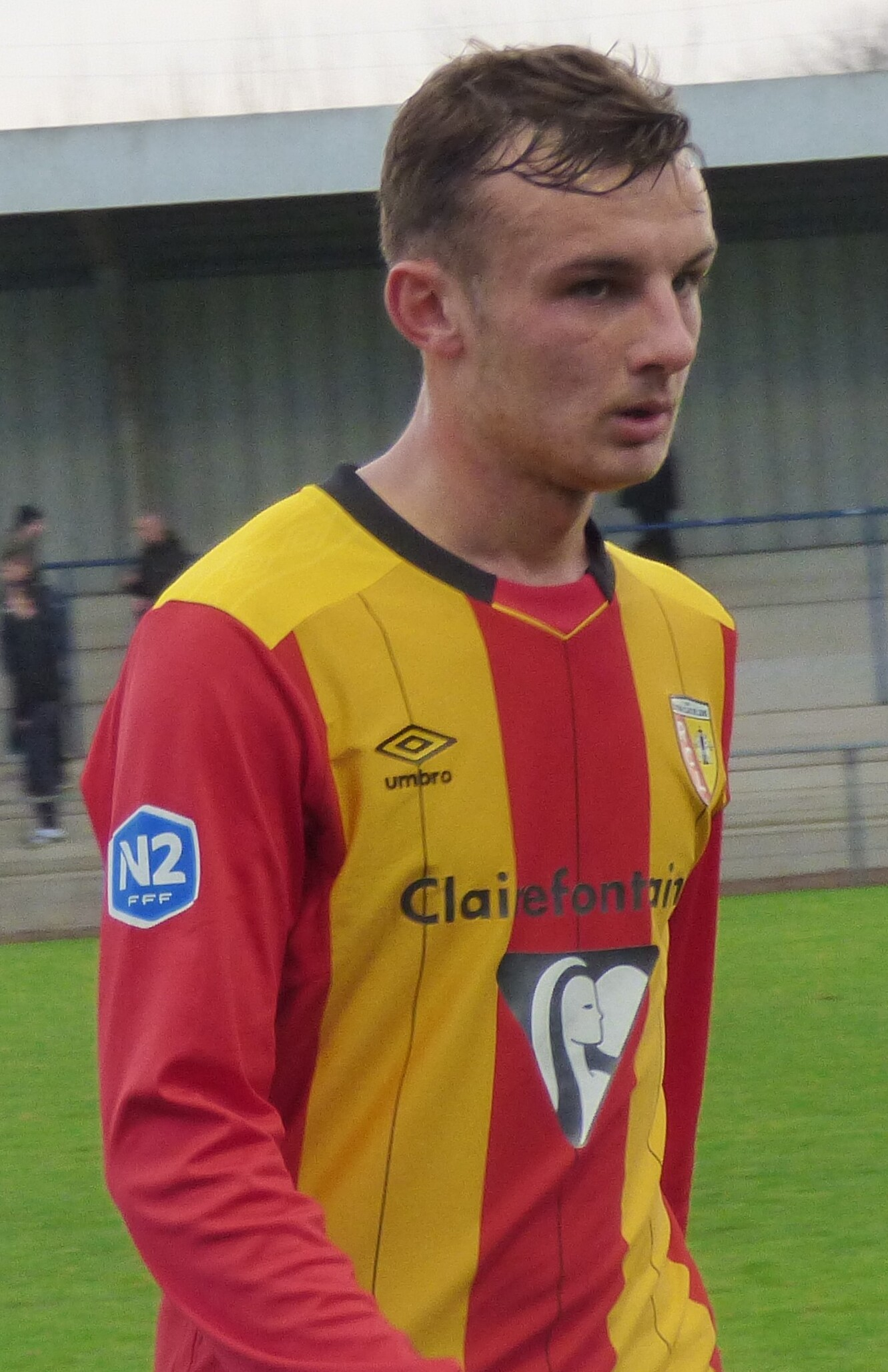
- Beghin with Lens II in 2018

Personal information
- Date of birth: 26 April 1997 (age 29)
- Place of birth: Seclin, France
- Height: 1.82 m (6 ft 0 in)
- Position: Midfielder

Team information
- Current team: Stade Briochin
- Number: 6

Youth career
- 2014–2017: Lens

Senior career*
| Years | Team | Apps | (Gls) |
| 2015–2019 | Lens II | 55 | (8) |
| 2017–2019 | Lens | 3 | (0) |
| 2018–2019 | → Boulogne (loan) | 31 | (3) |
| 2019–2022 | Boulogne | 74 | (0) |
| 2022– | Stade Briochin | 96 | (7) |
- * Club domestic league appearances and goals as of 23 June 2026

Guillaume Beghin (born 26 April 1997) is a French professional footballer who plays as a midfielder for Championnat National club Stade Briochin.

== Club career ==
Beghin made his senior debut for RC Lens in a 3–2 Ligue 2 win over Tours FC on 13 January 2017. On 14 June 2017 he signed a three-year professional contract with the club.

Beghin was loaned to Boulogne for the 2018–19 season. In August 2019 he was released by Lens and signed a two-year deal with Boulogne, with the option to extend by a further year.

On 22 June 2022, Beghin signed with Stade Briochin.
