= Bilel El Hamzaoui =

French footballer (born 1994)

Personal information
- Full name: Bilel El Hamzaoui
- Date of birth: 28 April 1994 (age 32)
- Place of birth: Montpellier, France
- Height: 1.75 m (5 ft 9 in)
- Position: Attacking midfielder

Team information
- Current team: RCO Agde

Youth career
- Cannes

Senior career*
Years	Team	Apps	(Gls)
2010–2014	Angers	5	(0)
2012–2013	→ Le Poiré-sur-Vie (loan)	28	(1)
2014–2015	CA Bastia	25	(1)
2015–2016	Dunkerque	25	(6)
2016–2017	Créteil	23	(1)
2017–2018	Boulogne	30	(0)
2018–2019	Dunkerque	28	(5)
2019–2020	Béziers	19	(4)
2020–2021	Union Titus Pétange	25	(4)
2021–2023	SC Toulon	30	(0)
2023–	RCO Agde	13	(3)
- * Club domestic league appearances and goals as of 3 February 2024

Bilel El Hamzaoui (born 28 April 1994) is a French professional footballer who plays as an attacking midfielder for RCO Agde.

== Career ==
He made his professional debut for Angers in the 2–0 win against Metz on 20 December 2011, coming on as a substitute for Claudiu Keserü. During the 2012–13 season, he had a loan spell with Le Poiré-sur-Vie.

== Personal life ==
El Hamzaoui was born in France and is Moroccan by descent. He acquired French nationality on 10 November 2003, through the collective effect of his parents' naturalization.
