= Axel Disasi =

French footballer (born 1998)

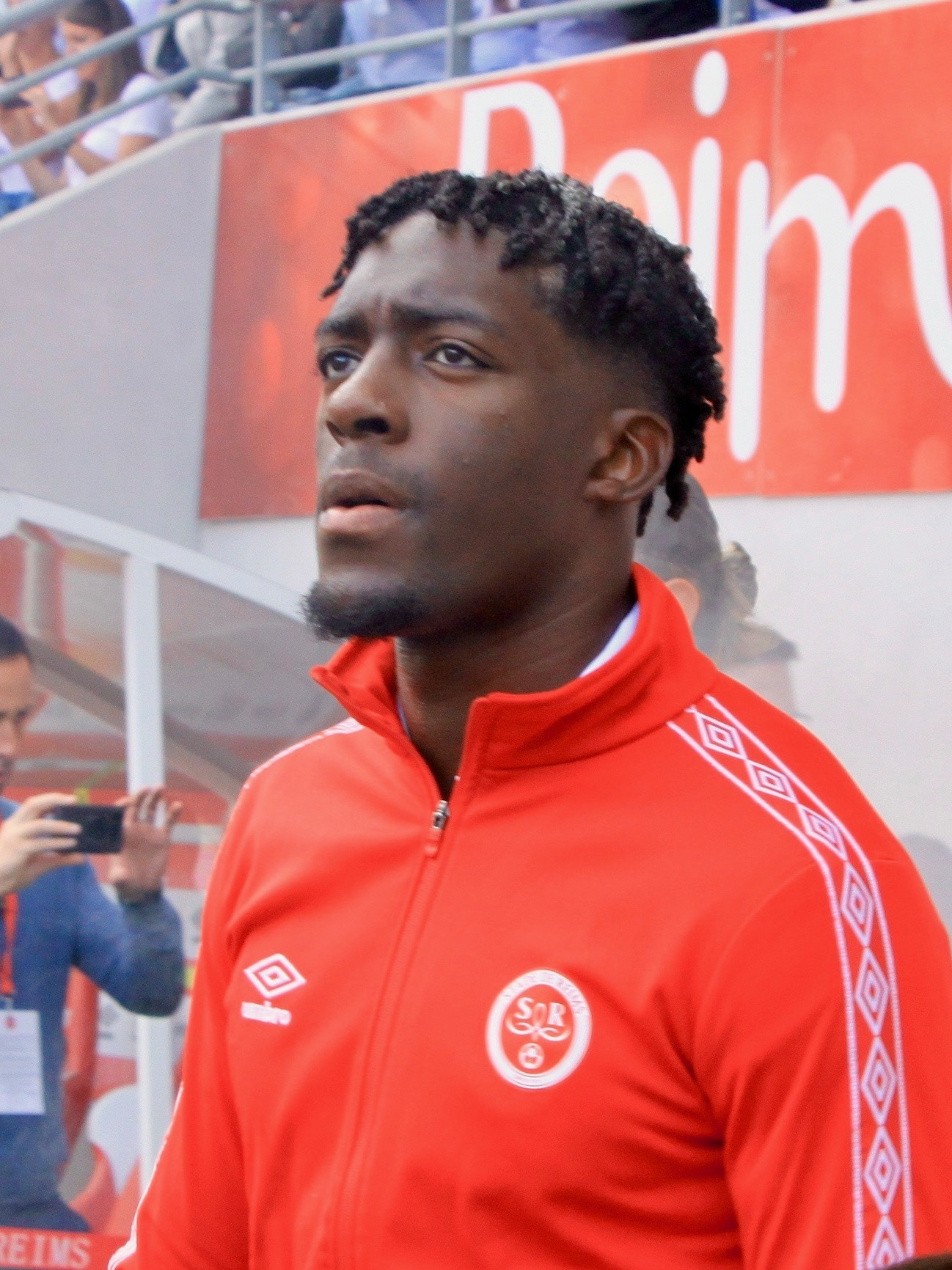
- Disasi with Reims in 2019

Personal information
- Full name: Axel Wilson Arthur Disasi Mhakinis Belho
- Date of birth: 11 March 1998 (age 28)
- Place of birth: Gonesse, France
- Height: 1.91 m (6 ft 3 in)
- Position: Centre-back

Team information
- Current team: Crystal Palace (on loan from Chelsea)
- Number: 5

Youth career
- 2006–2013: Villiers-le-Bel JS
- 2013–2014: USM Senlis
- 2014–2015: Paris FC

Senior career*
| Years | Team | Apps | (Gls) |
| 2015–2016 | Paris FC II | 19 | (2) |
| 2015–2016 | Paris FC | 3 | (1) |
| 2016–2019 | Reims II | 36 | (2) |
| 2016–2020 | Reims | 45 | (2) |
| 2020–2023 | Monaco | 99 | (7) |
| 2023– | Chelsea | 37 | (3) |
| 2025 | → Aston Villa (loan) | 7 | (0) |
| 2026 | → West Ham United (loan) | 14 | (0) |
| 2026– | → Crystal Palace (loan) | 5 | (0) |

International career
| 2017–2018 | France U20 | 3 | (0) |
| 2022–2023 | France | 5 | (0) |
Medal record
Men's football
Representing France
FIFA World Cup
| Runner-up | 2022 Qatar |
- * Club domestic league appearances and goals as of 19:30, 31 October 2026 (UTC)

Axel Wilson Arthur Disasi Mhakinis Belho (born 11 March 1998) is a French professional footballer who plays as a centre-back for Premier League club Crystal Palace, on loan from Chelsea.

== Early life ==
Axel Wilson Arthur Disasi Mhakinis Belho was born on 11 March 1998 in Gonesse, Val-d'Oise.

== Club career ==
=== Early career ===
As a boy Disasi represented local side Villiers-le-Bel JS from the age of eight, followed by a year at USM Senlis. He then moved to Paris FC in 2014, Disasi made his professional debut for the club in a 1–0 loss to Lens on 11 December 2015. He was later transferred to Reims in 2016.

=== Reims ===
Disasi began playing for the Reims senior team during the 2016- 2017 season in Ligue 2. In the 2017-2018 season Disasi helped Reims win Ligue 2 achieving automatic promotion to Ligue 1. Disasi made 53 appearances for Reims across all competitions.

=== Monaco ===
On 7 August 2020, Disasi completed a transfer from Reims to Monaco for a fee of €13 million. He signed a five-year contract with the club. On 23 August, Disasi made his debut for Monaco against his former club Reims. He scored a goal as the match ended 2–2. Disasi made 129 appearances in all competitions for Monaco.

=== Chelsea ===
On 4 August 2023, Disasi signed for Premier League club Chelsea on a six-year contract for a fee of £38.5 million (€45 million). He scored on his debut on 13 August in the 37th minute of a 1–1 draw at home to Liverpool, which was Chelsea's first match of the 2023–24 Premier League. On 18 February 2024, he produced a man of the match performance against title holders Manchester City in a 1–1 away draw by making 16 clearances, the most by a Chelsea player in the league in eight seasons.

==== Loan to Aston Villa and Chelsea exile ====
On 4 February 2025, Disasi signed for fellow Premier League club Aston Villa on loan for the remainder of the 2024–25 season for an undisclosed fee, reported to be £5m loan fee and wage coverage. He made his Premier League debut against Ipswich Town, in a 1–1 draw at home. On 8 March, he played a man of the match performance against Brentford away in the league, as Villa won 1–0 assisting their hopes of qualifying for European football.

Following his return to Chelsea, Disasi was omitted the squad alongside Raheem Sterling.

==== Loan to West Ham United ====
On 2 February 2026, Disasi joined West Ham United on loan for the remainder of the 2025–26 season.

==== Loan to Crystal Palace ====
On 26 August 2026, Disasi joined Crystal Palace on loan for the remainder of the season.

On 12th September 2026, Disasi was shown a red card and sent off for a foul on Ipswich player Jack Clarke.

== International career ==
Born in France, Disasi is of Congolese and Angolan descent and was called up to the DR Congo U20s for the 2017 Jeux de la Francophonie.

Disasi was a youth international for France, and on 14 November 2022, was called up to France’s 2022 FIFA World Cup squad, replacing the injured Presnel Kimpembe. On 30 November, the 24-year-old made his debut in a 1–0 group stage loss to Tunisia, becoming the first French international debutant during a World Cup since 1966. Disasi would go on to play in France's 3–1 win over Poland in the round of 16 on 4 December and the defeat on penalties following a 3–3 draw against Argentina in the final on 18 December.

== Career statistics ==
=== Club ===
As of match played 31 October 2026

Appearances and goals by club, season and competition
| Club | Season | League | | | National cup (Note: Includes Coupe de France, FA Cup) | | League cup (Note: Includes Coupe de la Ligue, EFL Cup) | | Europe | | Other | | Total | |
| Club | Season | Division | Apps | Goals | Apps | Goals | Apps | Goals | Apps | Goals | Apps | Goals | Apps | Goals |
|---|---|---|---|---|---|---|---|---|---|---|---|---|---|---|
| Paris FC II | 2015–16 | CFA 2 | 19 | 2 | — | | — | | — | | — | | 19 | 2 |
| Paris FC | 2015–16 | Ligue 2 | 3 | 1 | 1 | 0 | 0 | 0 | — | | — | | 4 | 1 |
| Reims II | 2016–17 | CFA | 21 | 1 | — | | — | | — | | — | | 21 | 1 |
| Reims II | 2017–18 | Championnat National 2 | 2 | 0 | — | | — | | — | | — | | 2 | 0 |
| Reims II | 2018–19 | Championnat National 2 | 13 | 1 | — | | — | | — | | — | | 13 | 1 |
| Reims II | Total | | 36 | 2 | — | | — | | — | | — | | 36 | 2 |
| Reims | 2016–17 | Ligue 2 | 1 | 0 | 0 | 0 | 0 | 0 | — | | — | | 1 | 0 |
| Reims | 2017–18 | Ligue 2 | 13 | 1 | 1 | 0 | 1 | 0 | — | | — | | 15 | 1 |
| Reims | 2018–19 | Ligue 1 | 4 | 0 | 0 | 0 | 1 | 0 | — | | — | | 5 | 0 |
| Reims | 2019–20 | Ligue 1 | 27 | 1 | 1 | 0 | 4 | 0 | — | | — | | 32 | 1 |
| Reims | Total | | 45 | 2 | 2 | 0 | 6 | 0 | — | | — | | 53 | 2 |
| Monaco | 2020–21 | Ligue 1 | 29 | 3 | 6 | 0 | — | | — | | — | | 35 | 3 |
| Monaco | 2021–22 | Ligue 1 | 32 | 1 | 4 | 0 | — | | 9 (Note: Three appearances in UEFA Champions League, six appearances and two goals in UEFA Europa League) | 2 | — | | 45 | 3 |
| Monaco | 2022–23 | Ligue 1 | 38 | 3 | 1 | 0 | — | | 10 (Note: Two appearances and one goal in UEFA Champions League, eight appearances and two goals in UEFA Europa League) | 3 | — | | 49 | 6 |
| Monaco | Total | | 99 | 7 | 11 | 0 | — | | 19 | 5 | — | | 129 | 12 |
| Chelsea | 2023–24 | Premier League | 31 | 2 | 6 | 0 | 7 | 1 | — | | — | | 44 | 3 |
| Chelsea | 2024–25 | Premier League | 6 | 1 | 1 | 0 | 2 | 0 | 8 (Note: Appearances in UEFA Conference League) | 1 | 0 | 0 | 17 | 2 |
| Chelsea | 2025–26 | Premier League | 0 | 0 | 0 | 0 | 0 | 0 | 0 | 0 | — | | 0 | 0 |
| Chelsea | Total | | 37 | 3 | 7 | 0 | 9 | 1 | 8 | 1 | 0 | 0 | 61 | 5 |
| Aston Villa (loan) | 2024–25 | Premier League | 7 | 0 | — | | — | | 3 (Note: Appearances in UEFA Champions League) | 0 | — | | 10 | 0 |
| West Ham United (loan) | 2025–26 | Premier League | 14 | 0 | 3 | 1 | — | | — | | — | | 17 | 1 |
| Crystal Palace (loan) | 2026–27 | Premier League | 5 | 0 | 0 | 0 | 0 | 0 | 3 (Note: Appearances in UEFA Europa League) | 0 | — | | 8 | 0 |
| Career total | | | 265 | 17 | 24 | 1 | 15 | 1 | 33 | 6 | 0 | 0 | 337 | 25 |

=== International ===
As of match played 21 November 2023

Appearances and goals by national team and year
| National team | Year | Apps | Goals |
|---|---|---|---|
| France | 2022 | 3 | 0 |
| France | 2023 | 2 | 0 |
| Total | | 5 | 0 |

== Honours ==
Reims

- Ligue 2: 2017–18

Chelsea

- UEFA Conference League: 2024–25
- EFL Cup runner-up: 2023–24

France

- FIFA World Cup runner-up: 2022
