= Hassane Kamara =

Ivorian footballer (born 1994)

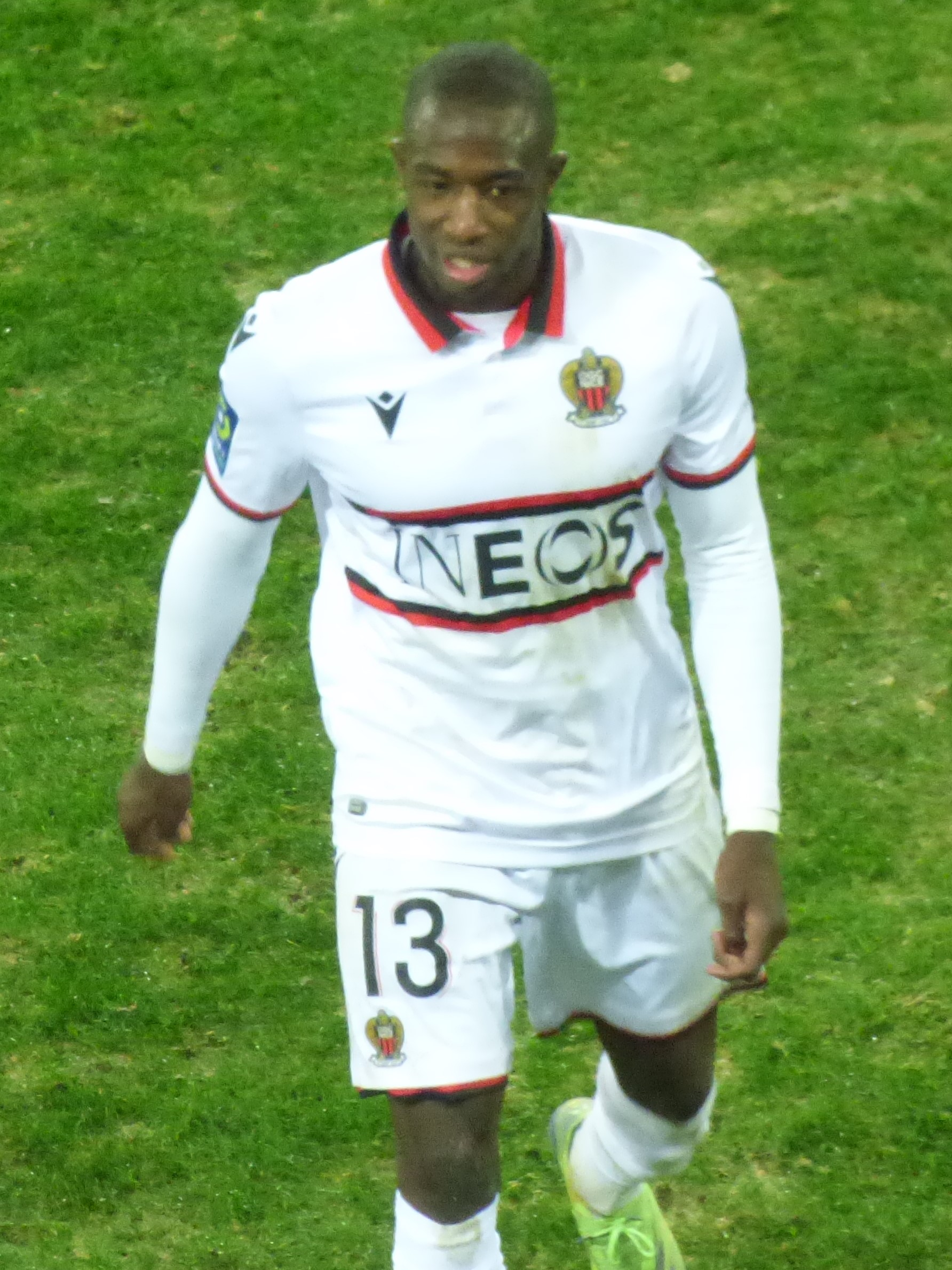
- Kamara with Nice in 2021

Personal information
- Full name: Hassane Kamara
- Date of birth: 5 March 1994 (age 32)
- Place of birth: Saint Denis, France
- Height: 1.68 m (5 ft 6 in)
- Positions: Left-back; left wing-back

Team information
- Current team: Udinese
- Number: 11

Youth career
- –2013: Châteauroux

Senior career*
| Years | Team | Apps | (Gls) |
| 2012–2014 | Châteauroux II | 35 | (6) |
| 2013–2015 | Châteauroux | 27 | (5) |
| 2015–2020 | Reims II | 32 | (7) |
| 2015–2020 | Reims | 64 | (3) |
| 2017 | → Créteil (loan) | 15 | (2) |
| 2020–2022 | Nice | 47 | (2) |
| 2022 | Watford | 23 | (1) |
| 2022– | Udinese | 92 | (3) |
| 2022–2023 | → Watford (loan) | 28 | (0) |

International career
| 2021–2022 | Ivory Coast | 7 | (0) |
- * Club domestic league appearances and goals as of 07:30, 23 August 2026 (UTC)

Hassane Kamara (born 5 March 1994) is a professional footballer who plays as a left-back or left wing-back for Serie A club Udinese. Born in France, he played for the Ivory Coast national team.

== Club career ==
=== Châteauroux ===
Kamara is a youth exponent of Châteauroux. He made his Ligue 2 debut for the club on 4 April 2014, in a match against Clermont. On 2 May 2014, he scored his first league goal in a match against Laval.

=== Reims ===
In August 2015, Kamara signed for Reims before joining Paris FC on loan. He helped Reims win the 2017–18 Ligue 2, achieving promotion to Ligue 1 for the 2018–19 season.

=== Nice ===
On 26 June 2020, Kamara signed for fellow French side Nice for an undisclosed fee reported to be around €4 million euros.

=== Watford ===
On 4 January 2022, Kamara signed for English club Watford on a three-and-a-half-year contract until June 2025. He scored his first Premier League goal for the club in a 5–1 defeat to then-league leaders Manchester City. On 7 May 2022, in the game against their manager Roy Hodgson's return to Selhurst Park, Kamara was sent off in the first-half after receiving two yellow cards. He gave away a penalty due to a handball. His team would go on to lose 1–0 against Crystal Palace and be relegated from the Premier League for a fourth time.

=== Udinese and Watford loan return ===
On 23 August 2022, Kamara signed for Serie A club Udinese for an undisclosed fee, and immediately returned on loan to Watford for the 2022–23 season.

== International career ==
Kamara holds French, Malian, Gambian and Ivorian nationalities. He rejected a call-up to the Gambia national team in March 2017. He debuted for the Ivory Coast national team in a friendly 2–1 win over Burkina Faso on 5 June 2021.

== Career statistics ==
=== Club ===
As of match played 22 August 2026

Appearances and goals by club, season and competition
| Club | Season | League | | | National cup | | League cup | | Other | | Total | |
| Club | Season | Division | Apps | Goals | Apps | Goals | Apps | Goals | Apps | Goals | Apps | Goals |
|---|---|---|---|---|---|---|---|---|---|---|---|---|
| Châteauroux II | 2012–13 | CFA 2 | 10 | 1 | — | | — | | — | | 10 | 1 |
| Châteauroux II | 2013–14 | CFA 2 | 20 | 4 | — | | — | | — | | 20 | 4 |
| Châteauroux II | 2014–15 | CFA 2 | 5 | 1 | — | | — | | — | | 5 | 1 |
| Châteauroux II | Total | | 35 | 6 | — | | — | | — | | 35 | 6 |
| Châteauroux | 2013–14 | Ligue 2 | 5 | 1 | 0 | 0 | 0 | 0 | — | | 5 | 1 |
| Châteauroux | 2014–15 | Ligue 2 | 21 | 4 | 3 | 1 | 1 | 0 | — | | 25 | 5 |
| Châteauroux | 2015–16 | Championnat National | 1 | 0 | 0 | 0 | 0 | 0 | — | | 1 | 0 |
| Châteauroux | Total | | 27 | 5 | 3 | 1 | 1 | 0 | — | | 31 | 6 |
| Reims II | 2015–16 | CFA 2 | 10 | 3 | — | | — | | — | | 10 | 3 |
| Reims II | 2016–17 | CFA | 14 | 3 | — | | — | | — | | 14 | 3 |
| Reims II | 2017–18 | Championnat National 2 | 1 | 0 | — | | — | | — | | 1 | 0 |
| Reims II | 2018–19 | Championnat National 2 | 7 | 1 | — | | — | | — | | 7 | 1 |
| Reims II | Total | | 32 | 7 | — | | — | | — | | 32 | 7 |
| Reims | 2015–16 | Ligue 1 | 2 | 0 | 0 | 0 | 0 | 0 | — | | 2 | 0 |
| Reims | 2016–17 | Ligue 2 | 1 | 0 | 1 | 0 | 0 | 0 | — | | 2 | 0 |
| Reims | 2017–18 | Ligue 2 | 22 | 1 | 2 | 0 | 2 | 0 | — | | 26 | 1 |
| Reims | 2018–19 | Ligue 1 | 16 | 0 | 2 | 0 | 1 | 0 | — | | 19 | 0 |
| Reims | 2019–20 | Ligue 1 | 23 | 2 | 1 | 0 | 4 | 0 | — | | 28 | 2 |
| Reims | Total | | 64 | 3 | 6 | 0 | 7 | 0 | — | | 77 | 3 |
| Créteil (loan) | 2016–17 | Championnat National | 15 | 2 | 0 | 0 | 0 | 0 | — | | 15 | 2 |
| Nice | 2020–21 | Ligue 1 | 36 | 2 | 2 | 0 | — | | 4 (Note: Appearances in UEFA Europa League) | 1 | 42 | 3 |
| Nice | 2021–22 | Ligue 1 | 11 | 0 | 0 | 0 | — | | 0 | 0 | 11 | 0 |
| Nice | Total | | 47 | 2 | 2 | 0 | — | | 4 | 1 | 53 | 3 |
| Watford | 2021–22 | Premier League | 19 | 1 | — | | — | | — | | 19 | 1 |
| Watford | 2022–23 | Championship | 4 | 0 | — | | — | | — | | 4 | 0 |
| Watford | Total | | 23 | 1 | 0 | 0 | 0 | 0 | 0 | 0 | 23 | 1 |
| Watford (loan) | 2022-23 | Championship | 28 | 0 | — | | — | | — | | 28 | 0 |
| Udinese | 2023–24 | Serie A | 35 | 1 | 2 | 0 | — | | — | | 37 | 1 |
| Udinese | 2024–25 | Serie A | 30 | 1 | 2 | 0 | — | | — | | 32 | 1 |
| Udinese | 2025–26 | Serie A | 26 | 0 | 1 | 0 | — | | — | | 27 | 0 |
| Udinese | 2026–27 | Serie A | 1 | 1 | 1 | 0 | — | | — | | 2 | 1 |
| Udinese | Total | | 92 | 3 | 6 | 0 | 0 | 0 | 0 | 0 | 98 | 3 |
| Career total | | | 348 | 28 | 16 | 1 | 10 | 0 | 4 | 1 | 376 | 30 |

== Honours ==
Reims

- Ligue 2: 2017–18
