= Patrice Descamps =

French football manager and former player (born 1974)

Personal information
- Date of birth: 25 January 1974 (age 52)
- Place of birth: Abbeville, France
- Height: 1.84 m (6 ft 0 in)
- Position: Midfielder

Team information
- Current team: Amiens (youth)

Youth career
- Menchecourt
- 1988–1992: Abbeville

Senior career*
Years	Team	Apps	(Gls)
1992–1998	Abbeville		

Managerial career
- 2014–2018: Amiens B
- 2018–: Amiens (youth)
- 2023: Amiens (interim)
- * Club domestic league appearances and goals

Patrice Descamps (born 25 January 1974) is a French professional football manager and former player who is the director of the youth academy of the Ligue 2 club Amiens. As a player, he was a midfielder.

== Managerial career ==
Descamps had a career as a semi-amateur footballer entirely with his local club Abbeville, studied as an educator and in 1998 moved to Amiens as one of their football teachers. He was appointed as head of their reserves in 2014. In 2016, he was appointed as the head of their youth academy. On 3 April 2023, Amiens' manager Philippe Hinschberger was let go and Descamps was appointed interim manager. On 16 June 2023, he returned to his post as director of Amien's youth academy.
