= Cory Sene =

Senegalese footballer (born 2001)

Personal information
- Full name: Cheikh Cory Sene
- Date of birth: 20 April 2001 (age 25)
- Place of birth: Guédiawaye, Senegal
- Height: 1.96 m (6 ft 5 in)
- Position: Centre-back

Team information
- Current team: Viktoria Plzeň
- Number: 4

Youth career
- Diambars

Senior career*
Years	Team	Apps	(Gls)
2019	Lens	1	(0)
2019–2023	Lens B	65	(4)
2021	→ Annecy (loan)	3	(0)
2023–2024	SV Lafnitz	21	(1)
2024–	Viktoria Plzeň	2	(0)
2024–	Viktoria Plzeň B	21	(2)
- * Club domestic league appearances and goals as of 17 June 2025

Cheikh Cory Sene (born 20 April 2001) is a Senegalese professional footballer who plays as a centre-back for Czech First League club Viktoria Plzeň.

== Professional career ==
Sene made his professional debut in a 2–1 Ligue 2 win over Le Mans on 27 July 2019.

On 12 January 2021, Sene was loaned to French side Annecy, until the end of the season.

On 14 July 2023, Sene signed a permanent deal with Austrian 2. Liga club SV Lafnitz.

On 20 June 2024, Sene signed a three-year contract with Czech First League club Viktoria Plzeň.
