= Hicham Benkaid =

French association football player (born 1990)

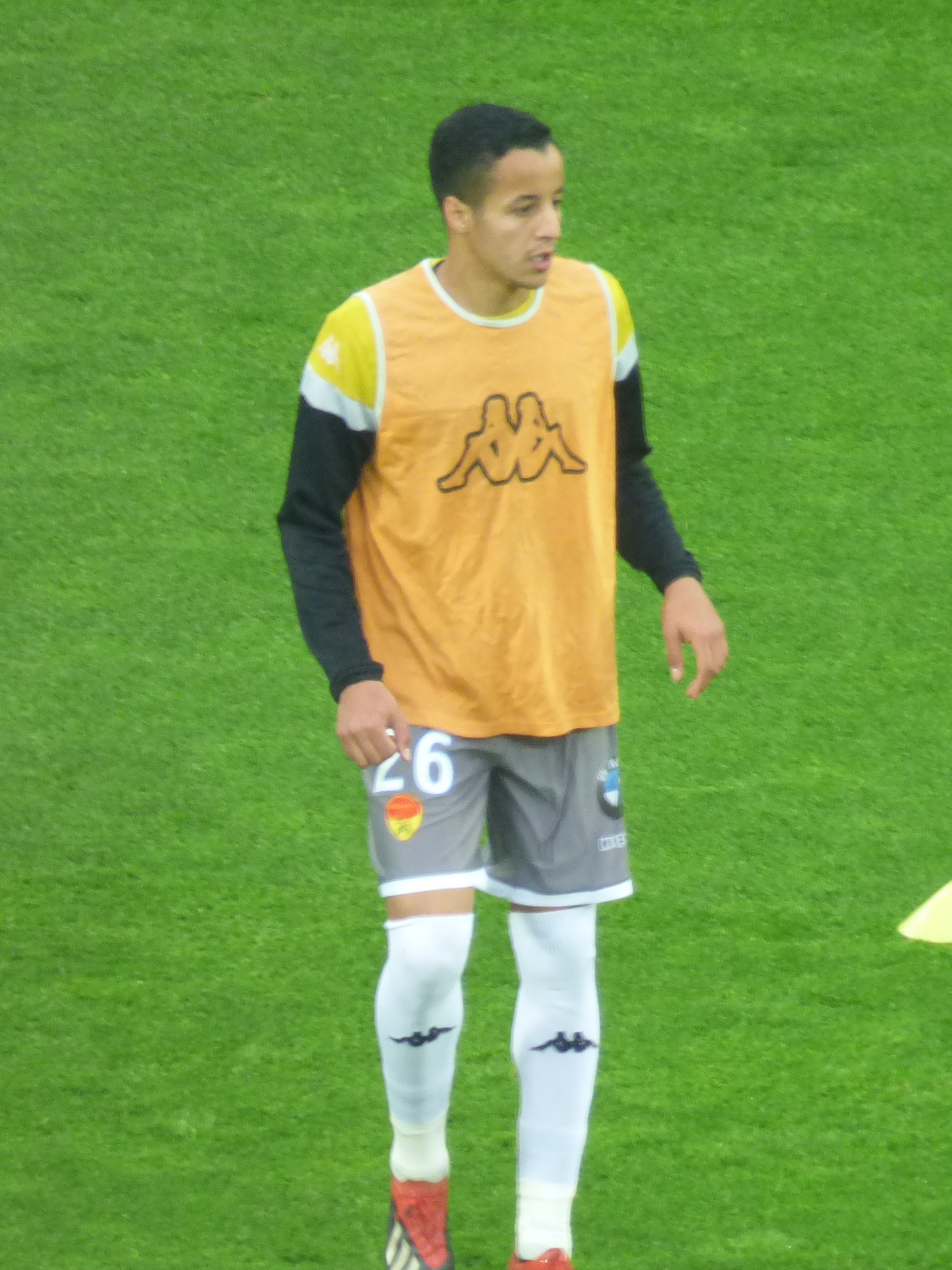
- Benkaid in 2019

Personal information
- Date of birth: 26 April 1990 (age 36)
- Place of birth: Strasbourg, France
- Height: 1.78 m (5 ft 10 in)
- Position: Forward

Team information
- Current team: Stade Briochin
- Number: 26

Youth career
- 1995–2008: FCOSK 06

Senior career*
Years	Team	Apps	(Gls)
2008–2009	CS Neuhof Strasbourg		
2009–2010	FCSR Obernai		
2010	Saint-Dié		
2011–2012	SC Dinsheim		
2012–2016	Colmar	54	(8)
2016–2017	Strasbourg	1	(0)
2017–2022	Orléans	82	(15)
2022–2023	Stade Briochin	20	(12)
2023–2025	Rouen	51	(19)
2025–2026	Créteil	6	(0)
2026–	Stade Briochin	3	(1)

International career^{‡}
2011	France Futsal	2	(0)
- * Club domestic league appearances and goals as of 23 June 2026 ‡ National team caps and goals as of 4 December 2017

Hicham Benkaid (born 26 April 1990) is a French professional footballer who plays as a forward for Championnat National 1 club Stade Briochin.

== Professional career ==
A former futsal player, Benkaid began his career with SR Colmar, before transferring to RC Strasbourg Alsace. He made his professional debut for RC Strasbourg Alsace in a 4–3 Ligue 2 loss to Amiens SC on 14 January 2017.

He signed for Ligue 2 side Orléans on 23 June 2017.

On 6 December 2022, Benkaid joined Stade Briochin.

== International career ==
Benkaid played for the France national futsal team in qualifiers for the 2012 FIFA Futsal World Cup.

== Personal life ==
Benkaid holds both French and Moroccan nationalities.
