= Quentin Lacour =

French association football player (born 1993)

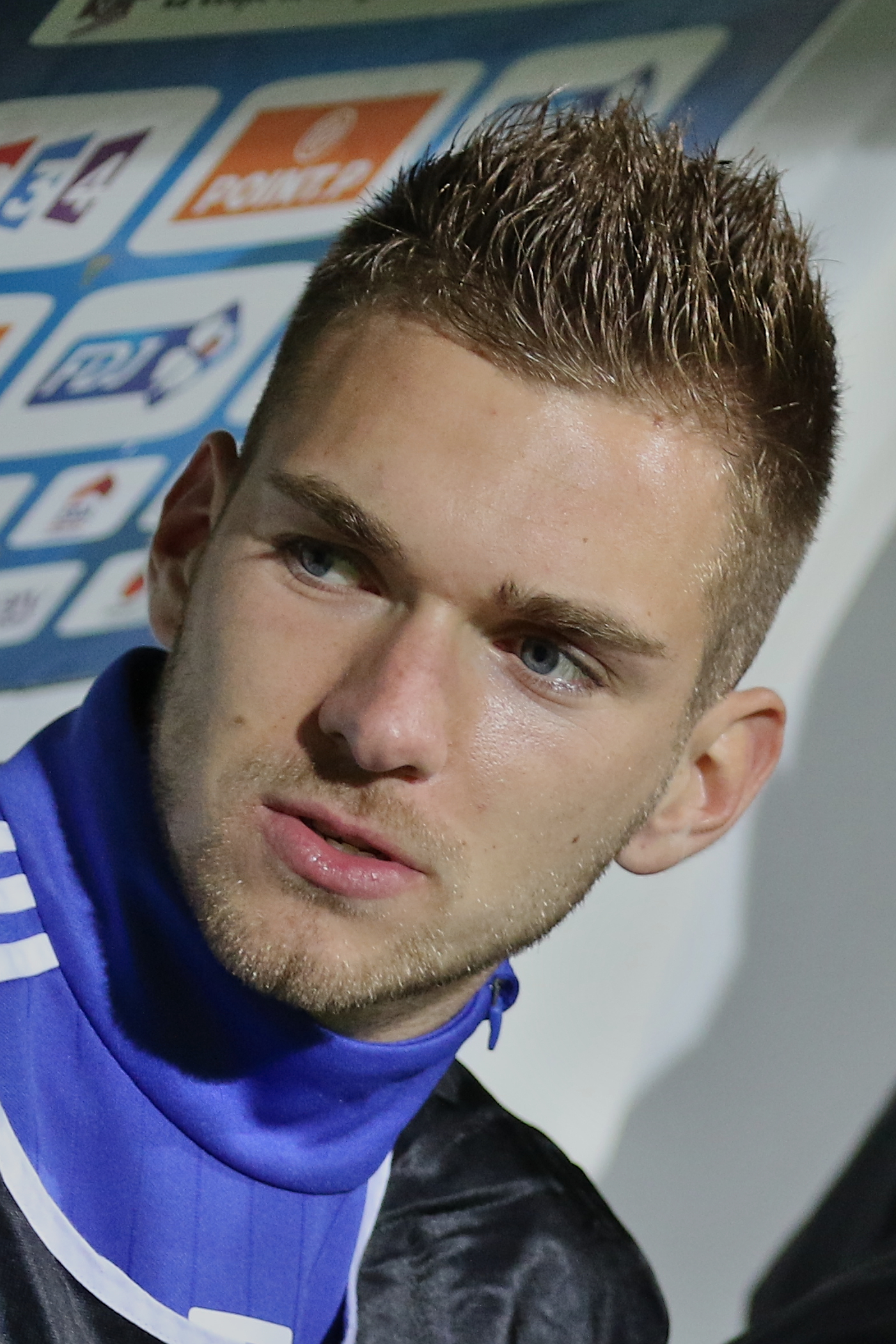

Personal information
- Date of birth: 27 August 1993 (age 33)
- Place of birth: Bourg-en-Bresse, France
- Height: 1.93 m (6 ft 4 in)
- Position: Defender

Team information
- Current team: Bourg-Péronnas
- Number: 5

Youth career
- 2004–2009: Bourg-Péronnas
- 2009–2012: Auxerre

Senior career*
Years	Team	Apps	(Gls)
2012–2016	Bourg-Péronnas	59	(3)
2016–2017	CA Bastia	28	(1)
2017–2019	FC Villefranche	55	(1)
2019–2022	Bourg-Péronnas	45	(1)
2022–2023	Louhans-Cuiseaux	27	(1)
2023–	Bourg-Péronnas	81	(2)
- * Club domestic league appearances and goals as of 23 June 2026

Quentin Lacour (born 27 August 1993) is a French professional footballer who plays for Ligue 3 club Bourg-Péronnas.

== Club career ==
Lacour was part of the youth training centre at Bourg-en-Bresse for five years, before signing professional with the club. He made two appearances in the 2015–16 Ligue 2 season.

In June 2016 he signed for CA Bastia in the Championnat National due to lack of playing time at Bourg-en-Bresse. A year later, in June 2017, he moved to FC Villefranche. During his second year at the club, he was part of the Villefranche side which reached the round of 16 in the 2018–19 Coupe de France, in which the club lost 0–3 in extra time to Ligue 1 club Paris Saint-Germain F.C.

Lacour returned to Bourg-en-Bresse in June 2019.
