= Mattéo Rabuel =

French footballer (born 2000)

Personal information
- Date of birth: 4 May 2000 (age 26)
- Place of birth: L'Isle-d'Espagnac, France
- Height: 1.81 m (5 ft 11 in)
- Position: Centre-back

Team information
- Current team: La Roche
- Number: 18

Youth career
- Valenciennes

Senior career*
Years	Team	Apps	(Gls)
2019–2022	Valenciennes II	32	(0)
2022–2023	Valenciennes	11	(0)
2023–2025	Avranches	58	(1)
2025–2026	Stade Briochin	23	(0)
2026–	La Roche	0	(0)
- * Club domestic league appearances and goals as of 23 June 2026

Mattéo Rabuel (born 4 May 2000) is a French professional footballer who plays as a centre-back for Ligue 3 club La Roche.

== Career ==
Rabuel is a youth product of Valenciennes and began his senior career with their reserves in 2019. On 15 May 2022, he made his senior and professional debut with in a 2–1 Ligue 2 win over Niort. On 1 June 2022, he signed his first professional contract with Valenciennes for one year. He had a strong start with Valenciennes, averaging over 2.5 points per game in the first months of the 2022–23 season.

== Personal life ==
Rabuel is the son of Nicolas Rabuel who is a French football coach and former professional footballer.
