= Nicolas Rabuel =

French footballer (born 1978)

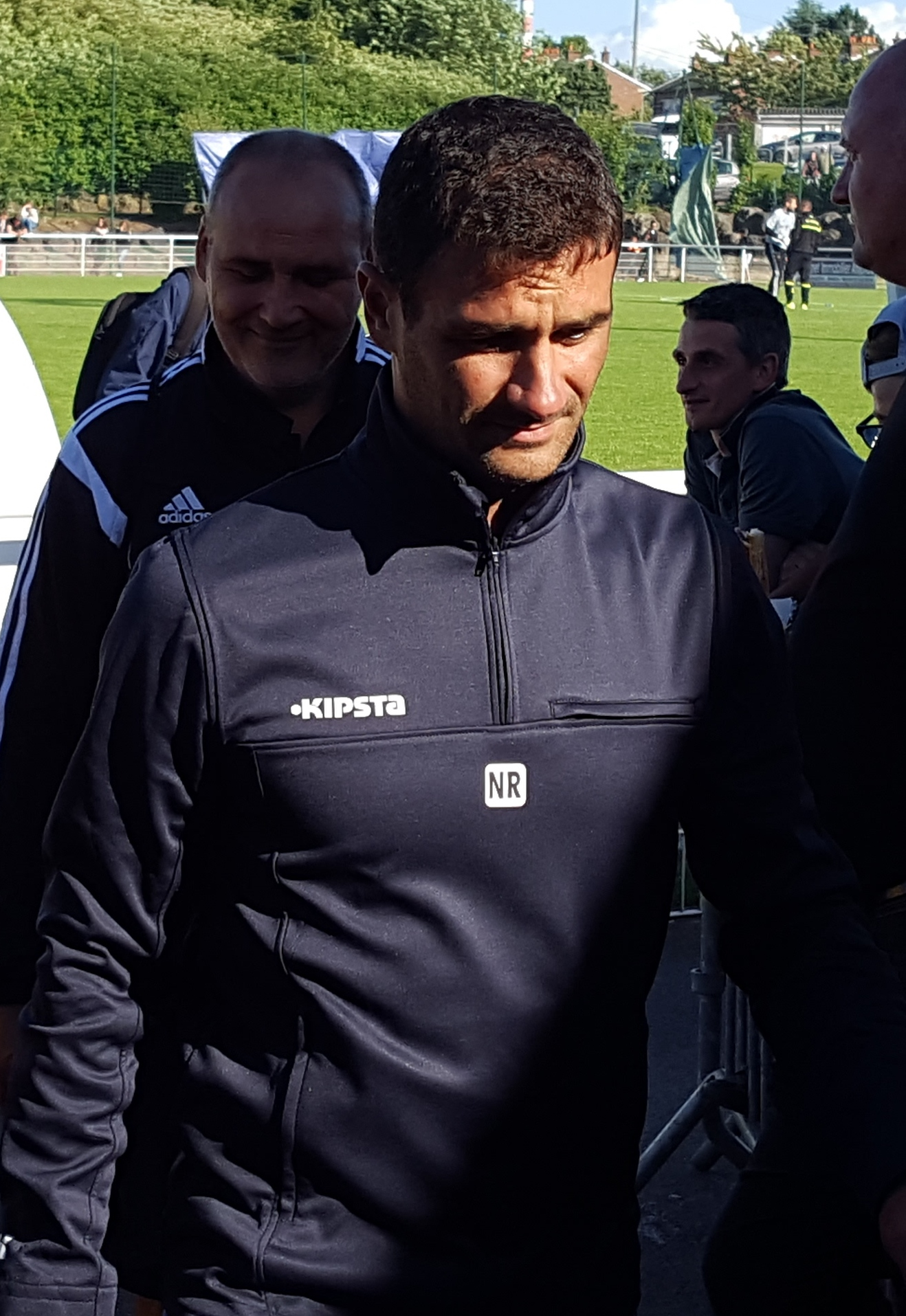
- Rabuel (foreground) in 2016

Personal information
- Date of birth: 15 January 1978 (age 48)
- Place of birth: Bourg-en-Bresse, France
- Height: 5 ft 10 in (1.78 m)
- Position: Defender

Team information
- Current team: Bourg-Péronnas (manager)

Youth career
- Lyon

Senior career*
Years	Team	Apps	(Gls)
1997–1999	Lyon Réserve	43	(6)
1999–2000	AS Angoulême	30	(7)
2000–2001	AS Nancy	14	(0)
2001–2002	CS Louhans-Cuiseaux	32	(2)
2002–2004	Rouen FC	72	(6)
2004–2005	AS Cannes	37	(3)
2005–2007	Nîmes Olympique	58	(0)
2007–2011	US Boulogne	89	(1)

Managerial career
- 2011–2013: Boulogne (scout)
- 2013–2014: Boulogne B
- 2014–2021: Valenciennes (assistant)
- 2015–2016: Valenciennes (caretaker)
- 2021: Valenciennes (U19)
- 2021–2022: Valenciennes B
- 2022–2023: Valenciennes
- 2024–2026: SAS Épinal
- 2026–: Bourg-Péronnas
- * Club domestic league appearances and goals

Nicolas Rabuel (born 15 January 1978) is a French football coach and a former defender who is the manager of Ligue 3 club Bourg-Péronnas.

His previous clubs include Olympique Lyonnais, AS Angoulême, AS Nancy, Louhans-Cuiseaux, FC Rouen 1899, AS Cannes, Nîmes Olympique and US Boulogne.

== Personal life ==
Rabuel is the father of Mattéo Rabuel, a footballer who he currently manages at Valenciennes.
