= Virgile Piechocki =

French footballer (born 1997)

Personal information
- Date of birth: 12 January 1997 (age 29)
- Place of birth: Pontarlier, France
- Height: 1.85 m (6 ft 1 in)
- Position: Midfielder

Team information
- Current team: Colmar

Youth career
- 2008–2015: Pontarlier

Senior career*
Years	Team	Apps	(Gls)
2015–2019	Reims II	64	(13)
2017–2019	Reims	4	(0)
2019–2020	Gazélec Ajaccio	18	(1)
2020–2021	Vannes	8	(1)
2021–2023	Avranches	32	(2)
2021–2023	Avranches II	7	(0)
2023–2024	Le Puy	16	(1)
2024–	Colmar	8	(2)
- * Club domestic league appearances and goals as of 7 December 2024

Virgile Piechocki (born 12 January 1997) is a French professional footballer who plays as a midfielder for Championnat National 3 club Colmar.

== Career ==
Piechocki was a full-time student who played amateur football, before he was scouted by Reims in 2015. Piechocki made his professional debut for Stade de Reims in a Ligue 2 3–0 win over Chamois Niortais on 28 April 2017.

Piechocki was part of the Reims squad that won the 2017–18 Ligue 2 and promotion to the Ligue 1 for the 2018–19 season.

In May 2021, he signed with Avranches in the Championnat National.

== Personal life ==
Piechocki holds both French and Portuguese nationalities.

== Honours ==
Reims

- Ligue 2: 2017–18
