= Football Bourg-en-Bresse Péronnas 01 =

Football club in Bourg-en-Bresse, France

Bourg-Péronnas
- Full name: Football Bourg-en-Bresse Péronnas 01
- Nickname: FBBP 01
- Founded: 1942; 84 years ago
- Ground: Stade Marcel-Verchère, Bourg-en-Bresse
- Capacity: 11,400
- President: Patrick Martellucci
- Manager: Nicolas Rabuel
- League: Ligue 3
- 2025–26: Championnat National, 15th of 17
- Website: fbbp01.fr
Home colours	Away colours

Football Bourg-en-Bresse Péronnas 01 (French: [futbol buʁk‿ɑ̃ bʁɛs peʁɔna zeʁo œ̃]), also known as FBBP 01 (French: [ɛf.be.be.pe zeʁo œ̃]) and FC Bourg-Péronnas, is a French association football team founded in 1942. They are based in Bourg-en-Bresse, Auvergne-Rhône-Alpes, France and currently play in Championnat National from 2024–25, the third tier of the French football league system. They play at the Stade Marcel-Verchère in Bourg-en-Bresse, which has a capacity of 11,400.

== History ==
=== 2015–2020: Professional football ===
On 23 May 2015, the club was promoted to Ligue 2 for the first time in their history by virtue of being a point ahead of Strasbourg following their 2–0 victory over US Boulogne. After being the first football club in Ain participating in the National 2 in 1994, 21 years later, FC Bourg-Péronnas were the first football club of the department to play at the professional level.

In July 2015, the club changed their name to Football Bourg-en-Bresse Péronnas 01, coinciding with their promotion to Ligue 2.

The club was relegated at the end of the 2017–18 Ligue 2 season, after losing the relegation play-off to Grenoble, returning to the third tier after 3 seasons.

On 2 July 2020 the French football federation's financial body, the DNCG, announced the end of the clubs professional status, despite them having played in Ligue 2 two years earlier.

On 26 May 2023, FBBP 01 were officially relegated to Championnat National 2 for the first time in 11 years after a 3-3 draw against AS Nancy Lorraine on the last matchday.

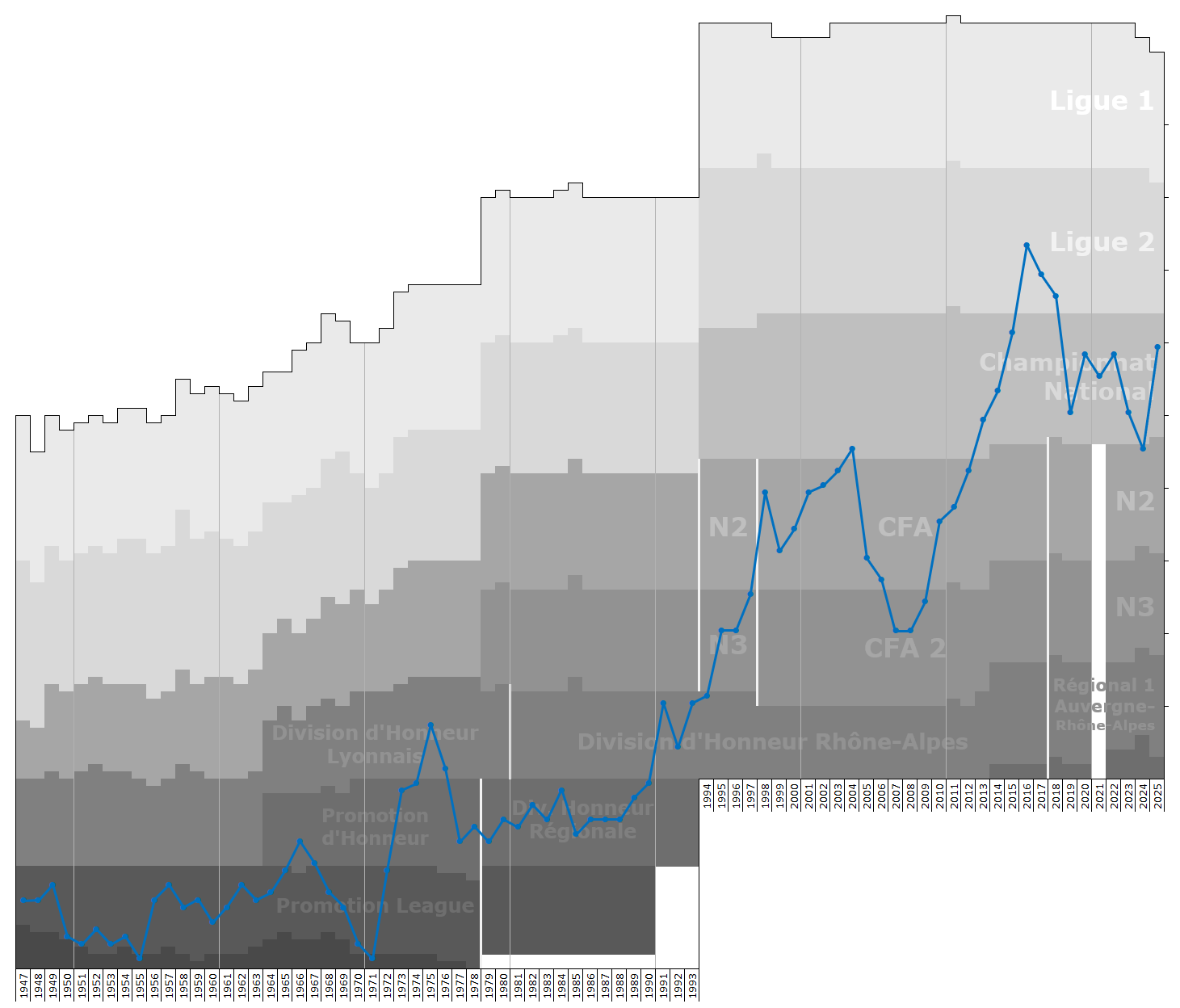
Historical league performance chart of FC Bourg-Péronnas

== Performance by league ==
League balance of Football Bourg-en-Bresse Péronnas
League	Seasons	Titles	BP	M	W	D	L	GF	GA	GD
Ligue 2	3	0	-	-	-	-	-	-	-	-
National	4	0	3rd	144	50	41	53	159	165	-7
Championnat de France Amateur	11	1	1st	370	141	100	129	504	478	+26
Championnat de France amateur 2 / National 3	6	2	1st	138	72	50	46	256	191	+55
Ligue Rhône-Alpes / Ligue du Lyonnais	50	-	1st	-	-	-	-	-	-	-

== Crest evolution ==
Logo until July 2015

== Coaching staff ==
- Trainer: (France) Karim Mokeddem

== Current squad ==
As of 5 September 2026

Note: Flags indicate national team as defined under FIFA eligibility rules; some limited exceptions apply. Players may hold more than one non-FIFA nationality.

No.	Pos.	Nation	Player
1	GK	FRA	Lenny Montfort
4	DF	FRA	Adam Dihad
5	DF	FRA	Quentin Lacour
6	MF	FRA	Rayan Souici
7	MF	COD	Zola Oniesim
8	MF	FRA	Tom Frayssinous
9	FW	FRA	Ikauar Mendes
10	FW	EGY	Mahmoud El Wakil
11	MF	FRA	Yassine Abraou
12	DF	FRA	Grégory Coelho
14	MF	FRA	Alvin Krizoua
15	FW	FRA	Thibaut Ehling
16	GK	FRA	Arthur Mazuy
17	DF	POR	Victor Lebas

No.	Pos.	Nation	Player
18	DF	FRA	Youssouf Kanouté
19	MF	FRA	Mathéo Tyburn
20	FW	FRA	Elhadj Keita
21	DF	FRA	Esteban Alberto
22	MF	FRA	Tom Gomes (on loan from Pau)
23	MF	FRA	Mounir El Hajjami
24	FW	FRA	Exaucé Mpembele Boula (on loan from Boulogne)
25	FW	FRA	Aymen Sabri
26	FW	FRA	Amine Groune
27	DF	FRA	Romain Muro
28	FW	FRA	Aness Gharbi
29	DF	FRA	Noah Dede-Lhomme
40	GK	FRA	Pierre Popp

== Notable players ==
- (France) Romain Del Castillo

== Managers ==
Rank	Name	Period
1	(France) Jacques Theppe	1985–1989
2	(France) Pierre Mauron	1989–1992
3	(France) Philippe Besset	1994–1996
4	(France) Diego Garzitto	1995–1996
5	(France) Pierre Mauron	1996–1999
6	(France) Jacques Theppe	1999–2000
7	(France) Thierry Droin	2000–2004
8	(France) Christophe Desbouillons	2004–2006
9	(France) Pierre Mauron	2006–2008
10	(France) Hervé Della Maggiore	2008–2018
11	(France) Damien Ott	2018–2019
12	(France) Karim Mokeddem	2019–2021
13	(France) Alain Pochat	2021–present
