= 2011–12 in French football =

Football in France
- Season: 2011–12

Men's football
- Ligue 1: Montpellier
- Ligue 2: Bastia
- Championnat National: Nîmes
- Coupe de France: Lille
- Coupe de la Ligue: Marseille
- Trophée des Champions: Marseille

Women's football
- Division 1: Lyon
- Coupe de France: Lyon

The 2011–12 season was the 107th overall season of football and the 74th season of competitive professional football in France.

The men's France national team began play on 10 August 2011 contesting a friendly match against Chile. The team continued its qualification matches for UEFA Euro 2012. The men's youth international teams also began playing qualification matches for their yearly European Championship tournament. Les Espoirs began its qualification campaign for the 2013 UEFA European Under-21 Football Championship, while the under-19 and under-17 teams played qualification matches for the 2011 UEFA European Under-19 Football Championship and 2011 UEFA European Under-17 Football Championship, respectively. Similarly, the women began their qualification campaign for UEFA Women's Euro 2013.

== News ==
=== Coupe de France final date change ===
In February 2011, it was reported by the French media that the French Football Federation had scheduled the 2011–12 edition of the Coupe de France final to be played on 5 May 2012. The date is significant because it would mark the 20th anniversary of the Furiani disaster, which occurred when a tribune at the Stade Armand Cesari in Furiani collapse during a Coupe de France semi-final match between Bastia and Marseille. The tragedy resulted in the death of 18 individuals and injuries to over 2,000. The resulting outcry and criticism of the decision to schedule the final on that date led to the Federation issuing a statement declaring that the official calendar for the competition had not been released, so the reports were only rumors. On 31 March 2011, the schedule was released and the date for the final was set for 28 April 2012.

=== Supercup in Morocco ===
On 15 April 2011, the Ligue de Football Professionnel announced that, for the third consecutive season, the Trophée des champions will be held on international soil. The match will be played in Tanger, Morocco at the recently completed Stade de Tanger and will be contested by the winner of Ligue 1 and the winner of the Coupe de France. The match will be played on either 27 July 2011. Like the previous two years, the idea will be to promote French football abroad, but this time more specifically in Africa and the Arab world.

=== New FFF president ===
On 18 June 2011, following an election, Federal Council member Noël Le Graët was named as the federation's 12th president after winning almost 55% of the vote. Le Graët defeated the incumbent Fernand Duchaussoy and third candidate Eric Thomas, the former receiving 45% of the vote, while the latter took in only .19% of the vote.

=== DNCG rulings ===
==== Ligue 2 ====
On 1 July 2011, following a preliminary review of each club's administrative and financial accounts in the Championnat National, the DNCG ruled that Tours would be relegated to the Championnat National. Tours president, Frédéric Sebag, confirmed the demotion was as a result of the club's failure to "balance its books". Sebag also confirmed that the club would be appealing the ruling. On 13 July, Tours successfully appealed to the DNCG and was, subsequently, reinstated into Ligue 2.

==== National ====
On 26 May 2011, following a preliminary review of each club's administrative and financial accounts in the Championnat National, the DNCG ruled that Pacy Vallée-d'Eure, Strasbourg, Gap, Grenoble, and Cannes would be relegated to the Championnat de France amateur after the organization determined that the club's were enduring financial difficulties. The clubs had the option to appeal the ruling. On 24 June 2011, Pacy Vallée-d'Eure officials confirmed in a press conference that it would accept its relegation to the fourth division in an effort to smooth over its €350,000 debt into next year. Two weeks later, Grenoble confirmed on its website that the Appeals Board of the DNCG had informed club officials that it will be relegated to the fourth division. Grenoble, subsequently, entered liquidation on 7 July. On 13 July, Grenoble's relegation was validated after the French Football Federation confirmed via letter to SAS Épinal that the club would be replacing Grenoble in the Championnat National.

On 8 July 2011, the Appeals Board of the DNCG confirmed that both Strasbourg and Gap would remain relegated after the clubs failed to convince the board of its intent to fix its financial liabilities. Strasbourg has a deficit of over €4 million, while Gap's debt has exceeded over €80,000. Following the appeal denial, Gap officials announced that the club would appeal to the CNOSF, the National Sporting Committee of France. On 18 July, despite both clubs still having the option to appeal the DNCG rulings, the Ligue du Football Amateur (LFA) announced that Red Star and Cherbourg would replace Strasbourg and Gap, respectively, for the 2011–12 edition of the Championnat National. On the following day, Cannes had its appeal to remain in the Championnat National rejected by the DNCG. Similar to Gap, following the decision, Cannes announced its intent to appeal the ruling at the CNOSF. On 29 July, the CNOSF gave a favorable ruling for Cannes recommending to the federation that Cannes should remain in the third division. On 3 August, the CNOSF ruled Gap confirmed the demotion of Gap to the Championnat de France amateur. The French Football Federation determined whether Cannes would be allowed to participate in the league on 4 August, one day before the season was set to begin at the federation's annual executive meeting. At the meeting, the Federation re-affirmed its decision to relegate Cannes to the CFA stating it "trust the DNCG and followed its decisions".

==== CFA ====
On 26 May 2011, following a preliminary review of each club's administrative and financial accounts in the Championnat National, the DNCG ruled that Pacy Vallée-d'Eure, Strasbourg, Gap, Grenoble, and Cannes would be relegated to the Championnat de France amateur (CFA) after the organization determined that the clubs were enduring financial difficulties. The organization also excluded Toulon from participating in the CFA and relegated both Agde and Chambéry to the fifth division. On 4 June, the DNCG announced that, for the second consecutive season, Calais would not be allowed to ascend to the CFA. All clubs had the option to appeal the rulings.

On 24 June 2011, Pacy Vallée-d'Eure officials confirmed in a press conference that it would accept its relegation to the fourth division in an effort to smooth over its €350,000 debt into next year. Two weeks later, on 4 July, Grenoble confirmed on its website that the Appeals Board of the DNCG had informed club officials that it will be relegated to the fourth division. Grenoble, subsequently, entered liquidation on 7 July, which made the club unable to participate in the CFA. On the same day as the Grenoble ruling, the DNCG also rejected the appeals of Toulon and Calais. On 8 July 2011, the Appeals Board of the DNCG confirmed that both Strasbourg and Gap would remain relegated after the clubs failed to convince the board of its intent to fix its financial liabilities. Strasbourg has a deficit of over €4 million, while Gap's debt has exceeded over €80,000. Following the appeal denial, Gap officials announced that the club would appeal to the CNOSF, the National Sporting Committee of France. On 13 July, Agde successfully appealed to the DNCG and was, subsequently, re-instated into the CFA, while Chambéry had its appeal rejected.

On 19 July, Cannes had its appeal to remain in the Championnat National rejected by the DNCG. Similar to Gap, following the decision, Cannes announced its intent to appeal the ruling at the CNOSF. On 29 July, the CNOSF gave a favorable ruling for Cannes recommending to the federation that Cannes should remain in the third division. On 3 August, the CNOSF ruled Gap confirmed the demotion of Gap to the Championnat de France amateur. The French Football Federation determined whether Cannes would be allowed to participate in the league on 4 August, one day before the season was set to begin at the federation's annual executive meeting. At the meeting, the Federation re-affirmed its decision to relegate Cannes to the CFA stating it "trust the DNCG and followed its decisions".

== Promotion and relegation ==
=== Men ===
Competition	Promoted	Relegated
Ligue 1	N/A	AS Monaco; Lens; Arles-Avignon
Ligue 2	Évian; Dijon; Ajaccio	Vannes; Nîmes; Grenoble
Championnat National	Bastia; Amiens; Guingamp	Bayonne; Rodez; Plabennec; Alfortville; Gueugnon
CFA	Besançon; Cherbourg (Note: Promoted to the Championat National as a result of Gap's administrative relegation.); Épinal (Note: Promoted to the Championat National as a result of Grenoble's administrative relegation after the club entered liquidation.); Gazélec Ajaccio; Le Poiré-sur-Vie; Martigues (Note: Promoted to the Championat National as a result of Cannes' administrative relegation.); Quevilly; Red Star (Note: Promoted to the Championat National as a result of Strasbourg's administrative relegation .)	Aurillac; Béziers; Caen B Louhans-Cuiseaux; Genêts Anglet; Lille B Lyon-Duchère; Mantes; Monts d'Or Azergues; Noisy-le-Sec; Rennes B Saint-Pryvé Saint-Hilaire
CFA 2	AC Amiens; Bordeaux B (Note: Promoted to the Championnat de France amateur in place of Chambéry who were administratively relegated back to the Championnat de France amateur 2 by the DNCG.); Calvi; Concarneau; Dunkerque; Marseille Consolat; Mont-de-Marsan; Pontivy; Saumur; Sarre-Union (Note: Promoted to the Championnat de France amateur in place of Strasbourg B who cannot appear in the same division as its parent club.); Valence; Valenciennes B	Alençon; Bagnols Pont; Bonchamp; Borgo; Brive; Changé; Dives; Douai; Évreux; Gueugnon B Hazebrouck; Jura Dolois; La Trinité; La Châtaigneraie; Langon Castets; Lannion; La Valette; Le Puy; Les Lilas; Lesquin; Libourne-Saint-Seurin; Montluçon; Ornans; Pacy Vallée-d'Eure B Prix-lès-Mézières; Quimper; Revel; Saint Marcel; Selongey; Toulouse Fontaines; Vauban Strasbourg
Division d'Honneur		N/A

=== Women ===
Competition	Promoted	Relegated
Division 1 Féminine	N/A	Le Mans; Toulouse; La Roche-sur-Yon
Division 2 Féminine	Vendenheim; Soyaux; Muret	Arlac Mérignac; Aulnat; Besançon; Leers; Limoges Landouge; Templemars-Vendeville

== Managerial changes ==
=== Ligue 1 ===
Team	Outgoing head coach	Manner of departure	Date of vacancy	Position in table	Incoming head coach	Date of appointment	Position in table
Auxerre	(France) Jean Fernandez	End of contract	2 June 2011	Off-season	(France) Laurent Fournier	8 June 2011	Off-season
Valenciennes	(France) Philippe Montanier	Joined Real Sociedad	4 June 2011	Off-season	(France) Daniel Sanchez	8 June 2011	Off-season
Nancy	(Uruguay) Pablo Correa	Resigned	5 June 2011	Off-season	(France) Jean Fernandez	5 June 2011	Off-season
Sochaux	(France) Francis Gillot	Resigned	5 June 2011	Off-season	(Bosnia and Herzegovina) Mehmed Baždarević	10 June 2011	Off-season
Bordeaux	(France) Eric Bédouet	Mutual consent	6 June 2011	Off-season	(France) Francis Gillot	6 June 2011	Off-season
Lyon	(France) Claude Puel	Fired	20 June 2011	Off-season	(France) Rémi Garde	21 June 2011	Off-season
Nice	(France) Eric Roy	Fired	15 November 2011	17th	(France) René Marsiglia	15 November 2011	17th
Paris Saint-Germain	(France) Antoine Kombouaré	Resigned	30 December 2011	1st	(Italy) Carlo Ancelotti	30 December 2011	1st
Evian	(France) Bernard Casoni	Fired	1 January 2012	11th	(Uruguay) Pablo Correa	2 January 2012	11th
Sochaux	(Bosnia and Herzegovina) Mehmed Baždarević	Fired	6 March 2012	20th	(France) Eric Hély	6 March 2012	20th
Auxerre	(France) Laurent Fournier	Fired	18 March 2012	20th	(France) Jean-Guy Wallemme	18 March 2012	20th

=== Ligue 2 ===
Team	Outgoing head coach	Manner of departure	Date of vacancy	Position in table	Incoming head coach	Date of appointment	Position in table
Sedan	(France) Landry Chauvin	Mutual consent	26 May 2011	Off-season	(France) Laurent Guyot	26 May 2011	Off-season
Lens	(Romania) László Bölöni	Mutual consent	1 June 2011	Off-season	(France) Jean-Louis Garcia	1 June 2011	Off-season
Nantes	(France) Philippe Anziani	Miutual consent	26 May 2011	Off-season	(France) Landry Chauvin	1 June 2011	Off-season
Angers	(France) Jean-Louis Garcia	Joined Lens	1 June 2011	Off-season	(France) Stéphane Moulin	2 June 2011	Off-season
Tours	(France) Daniel Sanchez	Joined Valenciennes	8 June 2011	Off-season	(Germany) Peter Zeidler	14 June 2011	Off-season
AS Monaco	(France) Laurent Banide	Sacked	12 September 2011	17th	(Italy) Marco Simone	12 September 2011	17th
Arles-Avignon	(Bosnia and Herzegovina) Faruk Hadžibegić	Sacked	23 November 2011	19th	(France) Thierry Laurey	28 November 2011	19th
Le Mans	(France) Arnaud Cormier	Sacked	22 December 2011	17th	(France) Denis Zanko	28 December 2011	17th

=== National ===
Team	Outgoing head coach	Manner of departure	Date of vacancy	Position in table	Incoming head coach	Date of appointment	Position in table
Le Poiré-sur-Vie	(France) Alain Ferrand	Resigned	11 May 2011	Off-season	(France) Oswald Tanchot	11 May 2011	Off-season
Fréjus	(France) Athos Bandini	Sacked	27 May 2011	Off-season	(France) Franck Priou	3 June 2011	Off-season
Paris	(France) Jean-Luc Vannuchi	Sacked	27 May 2011	Off-season	(Cameroon) Alain Mboma	7 June 2011	Off-season
Cannes	(France) Victor Zvunka	Mutual consent	27 May 2011	Off-season	(France) David Guion	7 June 2011	Off-season
Martigues	(France) Franck Priou	Joined Fréjus	3 June 2011	Off-season	(France) Jérôme Erceau	9 June 2011	Off-season
Créteil	(France) Hubert Velud	Resigned	22 May 2011	Off-season	(France) Jean-Luc Vasseur	9 June 2011	Off-season
Red Star	(Cameroon) Alain Mboma	Joined Paris	7 June 2011	Off-season	(France) Athos Bandini	10 June 2011	Off-season
Red Star	(France) Athos Bandini	Fired	13 October 2011	18th	(Mali) Vincent Doukantié	13 October 2011	18th
Fréjus	(France) Franck Priou	Fired	7 December 2011	10th	(France) Charly Paquille	7 December 2011	10th
Martigues	(France) Jérôme Erceau	Fired	13 February 2012	18th	(France) Jean-Luc Vannuchi	15 February 2012	18th
Rouen	(France) Éric Garcin	Fired	14 March 2012	8th	(France) Emmanuel da Costa	14 March 2012	8th

== Ownership changes ==
=== Ligue 1 ===
Club	New owner	Previous owner	Date
Paris Saint-Germain	Qatar Investment Authority	(United States) Colony Capital and (France) Butler Capital Partners	1 July 2011

=== Ligue 2 ===
Club	New owner	Previous owner	Date
Monaco	(Russia) Monaco Sports Invest	(France) AS Monaco	23 December 2011

== Competitions ==
Competition	Winner	Details	Match Report
Ligue 1	Montpellier	2011–12 Ligue 1	1st Ligue 1 title
Ligue 2	Bastia	2011–12 Ligue 2	
Championnat National	Nîmes	2011–12 Championnat National	
Championnat de France amateur	Carquefou	2011–12 Championnat de France amateur	
Championnat de France amateur 2		2011–12 Championnat de France amateur 2	
Division 1 Féminine	Lyon	2011–12 Division 1 Féminine	
Coupe de France	Lyon	2011–12 Coupe de France; Beat Quevilly 1–0	
Coupe de la Ligue	Marseille	2011–12 Coupe de la Ligue; Beat Lyon 1–0	Report
Coupe de France Féminine	Lyon	2011–12 Coupe de France Féminine; Beat Montpellier 2–1	
Coupe Gambardella	Nice	2011–12 Coupe Gambardella; Beat Saint-Étienne 2–1	
Trophée des Champions	Marseille	2011 Trophée des Champions; Beat Lille 5–4	Report

=== International competitions ===
==== Men's ====
Team / Competition	UEFA Champions League	UEFA Europa League
Lille	Group stage Eliminated	Did not qualify
Marseille	Quarter-finals eliminated by (Germany) Bayern Munich	Did not qualify
Lyon	Round of 16 eliminated by (Cyprus) APOEL	Did not qualify
Paris Saint-Germain	Did not qualify	Group stage Eliminated
Sochaux	Did not qualify	Playoff round eliminated by (Ukraine) Metalist Kharkiv
Rennes	Did not qualify	Group stage Eliminated

==== Women's ====
Team / Competition	UEFA Women's Champions League
Lyon	Champions; Beat (Germany) FFC Frankfurt in Final
Paris Saint-Germain	Round of 16 eliminated by (Germany) FFC Frankfurt

== National teams ==
=== Men's senior ===
Friendly

10 August 2011 Friendly	France	1–1	Chile	Montpellier, France
21:00 CEST	Rémy 19'	Report	Córdova 77'	Stadium: Stade de la Mosson; Referee: Stuart Attwell (England)

UEFA Euro 2012 qualification

2 September 2011 Qualifying Group D	Albania	1–2	France	Tirana, Albania
21:00 CEST	Bogdani 46'	Report	Benzema 11'; M'Vila 18'	Stadium: Qemal Stafa Stadium; Referee: Aleksei Nikolaev (Russia)

6 September 2011 Qualifying Group D	Romania	0–0	France	Bucharest, Romania
20:30 CEST		Report		Stadium: Stadionul Național; Referee: Howard Webb (England)

7 October 2011 Qualifying Group D	France	3–0	Albania	Saint-Denis, France
21:00 CEST	Malouda 11'; Rémy 38'; Réveillère 67'	Report		Stadium: Stade de France; Referee: Michael Koukoulakis (Greece)

11 October 2011 Qualifying Group D	France	1–1	Bosnia and Herzegovina	Saint-Denis, France
21:00 CEST	Nasri 77' (pen.)	Report	Džeko 40'	Stadium: Stade de France; Referee: Craig Thomson (Scotland)

Friendly

11 November 2011 Friendly	France	1–0	United States	Saint-Denis, France
21:00 CET	Rémy 74'	Report		Stadium: Stade de France; Attendance: 70,018; Referee: Michael Koukoulakis (Greece)

15 November 2011 Friendly	France	0–0	Belgium	Saint-Denis, France
21:00 CET		Report		Stadium: Stade de France; Attendance: 52,825; Referee: Cesar Muniz Fernandez (Spain)

29 February 2012 Friendly	Germany	1–2	France	Bremen, Germany
20:45 CET	Cacau 90+1'	Report	Giroud 21'; Malouda 69'	Stadium: Weserstadion; Attendance: 37,800; Referee: Paolo Tagliavento (Italy)

27 May 2012 Friendly	France	3–2	Iceland	Valenciennes, France
21:00 CEST	Debuchy 52'; Ribéry 84'; Rami 87'	Report	Bjarnason 28'; Sigþórsson 34'	Stadium: Stade du Hainaut; Attendance: 24,000; Referee: Sébastien Delferière (Belgium)

31 May 2012 Friendly	France	2–0	Serbia	Reims, France
21:00 CEST	Ribéry 11'; Malouda 16'	Report		Stadium: Stade Auguste-Delaune II; Referee: Knut Kircher (Germany)

5 June 2012 Friendly	France	4–0	Estonia	Le Mans, France
21:00 CEST	Ribéry 26'; Benzema 36', 47'; Ménez 90'	Report		Stadium: MMArena; Referee: Liran Liany (Israel)

UEFA Euro 2012

11 June 2012 Group D	France	1–1	England	Donetsk, Ukraine
19:00 CET	Nasri 39'	Report	Lescott 30'	Stadium: Donbas Arena; Attendance: 47,400; Referee: Nicola Rizzoli (Italy)

15 June 2012 Group D	Ukraine	0–2	France	Donetsk, Ukraine
19:00 CET		Report	Ménez 53'; Cabaye 56'	Stadium: Donbas Arena; Attendance: 48,000; Referee: Björn Kuipers (Netherlands)

19 June 2012 Group D	Sweden	2–0	France	Kyiv, Ukraine
21:45 CET	Ibrahimović 54'; Larsson 90+1'	Report		Stadium: Olympic Stadium; Attendance: 63,010; Referee: Pedro Proença (Portugal)

23 June 2012 Quarter-finals	Spain	2–0	France	Donetsk, Ukraine
21:45 CET	Alonso 19', 90+1' (pen.)	Report		Stadium: Donbas Arena; Attendance: 47,000; Referee: Nicola Rizzoli (Italy)

Last updated: 23 June 2012
Source: French Football Federation and UEFA

=== Women's senior ===
Friendly

24 August 2011 Friendly	France	2–0	Poland	Lens, France
20:45 CEST	Thomis 1'; Bussaglia 36'	Report		Stadium: Stade Félix-Bollaert; Referee: Stéphanie Frappart (France)

UEFA Women's Euro 2013 qualification

14 September 2011 Qualifying Group 4	Israel	0–5	France	Ness Ziona, Israel
20:45 CET		Report	Eni 5' (o.g.); Franco 62'; Abily 71'; Le Sommer 86'; Delie 87'	Stadium: Ness Ziona Stadium; Referee: Carina Vitulano (Italy)

22 September 2011 Qualifying Group 4	Republic of Ireland	1–3	France	Cork, Ireland
20:45 CET	O'Gorman 90+2'	Report	Nécib 62'; Delie 69'; Le Sommer 74'	Stadium: Turners Cross; Referee: Simona Ghisletta (Switzerland)

22 October 2011 Qualifying Group 4	Wales	1–4	France	Llanelli, Wales
19:00 CET	Ludlow 2'	Report	Thiney 43', 74'; Le Sommer 67'; Delie 85'	Stadium: Parc y Scarlets; Referee: Anastasia Pustovoitova (Russia)

26 October 2011 Qualifying Group 4	France	5–0	Israel	Troyes, France
20:45 CET	Thiney 15', 37', 38'; Bompastor 22' (pen.); Rubio 90'	Report		Stadium: Stade de l'Aube; Referee: Lina Lehtovaara (Finland)

Friendly

16 November 2011 Friendly	France	8–0	Uruguay	Pointe-à-Pitre, Guadeloupe
20:45 CET	Thiney 6', 45'; Delie 7'; Nécib 12'; Le Sommer 51', 65', 88'; Abily 53'	Report		Stadium: Stade René Serge Nabajoth; Referee: Severine Zinck (France)

20 November 2011 Friendly	France	5–0	Mexico	Fort-de-France, Martinique
20:45 CET	Nécib 5'; Delie 7', 33'; Thomis 38'; Renard 70'	Report		Stadium: Stade Pierre-Aliker; Referee: Elodie Coppola (France)

15 February 2012 Friendly	France	2–1	Netherlands	Nîmes, France
20:50 CET	Le Sommer 54'; Delie 67'	Report	Spitse 45+1'	Stadium: Stade des Costières; Referee: Stéphanie Frappart (France)

2012 Cyprus Cup

28 February 2012 Group A	France	3–0	Switzerland	Nicosia, Cyprus
13:30 CET	Delie 5'; Thiney 18'; Bompastor 38' (pen.)	Report		Stadium: GSP Stadium; Attendance: 20; Referee: Jenny Palmqvist (Sweden)

1 March 2012 Group A	Finland	1–2	France	Larnaca, Cyprus
16:30 CET	Sällström 64'	Report	Le Sommer 35'; Renard 70'	Stadium: GSZ Stadium

4 March 2012 Group A	England	0–3	France	Paralimni, Cyprus
13:30 CET		Report	Nécib 11'; Delie 50'; Thiney 80'	Stadium: Paralimni Stadium; Referee: Kirsi Heikkinen (Finland)

6 March 2012 Final	France	2–0	Canada	Larnaca, Cyprus
18:00 CET	Delie 31'; Nécib 62'	Report		Stadium: GSZ Stadium; Referee: Jenny Palmqvist (Sweden)

UEFA Women's Euro 2013 qualification

31 March 2012 Qualifying Group 4	France	2–0	Scotland	Le Havre, France
20:50 CET	Dieke 64' (o.g.); Renard 70'	Report		Stadium: Stade Jules Deschaseaux; Referee: Jana Adámková (Czech Republic)

4 April 2012 Qualifying Group 4	France	4–0	Wales	Caen, France
20:50 CET	Thomis 9', 38', 50'; Abily 80'	Report		Stadium: Stade Michel d'Ornano; Referee: Pernilla Larsson (Sweden)

Friendly

4 July 2012 Friendly	France	6–0	Romania	Orléans, France
20:50 CEST	Thomis 22'; Le Sommer 29', 41'; Nécib 33'; Franco 62'; Catala 68'	Report		Stadium: Stade de la Source; Attendance: 3,737; Referee: Esther Staubli (Switzerland)

11 July 2012 Friendly	France	3–0	Russia	Beauvais, France
20:50 CEST	Thiney 11'; Delie 22', 41'	Report		Stadium: Stade Pierre Brisson; Attendance: 10,000; Referee: Sabine Bonnin (France)

19 July 2012 Friendly	France	2–0	Japan	Paris, France
17:15 CEST	Delie 24'; Renard 73'	Report		Stadium: Stade Sébastien Charléty; Referee: Stéphanie Frappart (France)

2012 Summer Olympics

25 July 2012 Group G	United States	4–2	France	Glasgow, Scotland
17:00 CEST	Wambach 19'; Morgan 32', 66'; Lloyd 56'	Report	Thiney 12'; Delie 14'	Stadium: Hampden Park; Referee: Sachiko Yamagishi (Japan)

28 July 2012 Group G	France	5–0	North Korea	Glasgow, Scotland
19:45 CEST	Georges 45'; Thomis 70'; Delie 71'; Renard 81'; Catala 87'	Report		Stadium: Hampden Park; Referee: Therese Neguel (Cameroon)

31 July 2012 Group G	France	1–0	Colombia	Newcastle, England
17:15 CEST	Thomis 5'	Report		Stadium: St James' Park; Referee: Quetzalli Alvarado (Mexico)

3 August 2012 Quarter-finals	Sweden	1–2	France	Glasgow, Scotland
12:00 CEST	Fischer 18'	Report	Georges 29'; Renard 39'	Stadium: Hampden Park; Referee: Kari Seitz (United States)

6 August 2012 Semi-finals	France	1–2	Japan	London, England
17:00 CEST	Le Sommer 76'	Report	Ōgimi 32'; Sakaguchi 49'	Stadium: Wembley Stadium; Referee: Quetzalli Alvarado (Mexico)

9 August 2012 Bronze medal match	Canada	1–0	France	Coventry, England
13:00 CEST	Matheson 90+2'	Report		Stadium: City of Coventry Stadium; Referee: Jenny Palmqvist (Sweden)

Last updated: 9 August 2012
Source: French Football Federation

=== France U-21 ===
2013 UEFA European Under-21 Football Championship qualification

2 September 2011	Latvia	0 – 3	France	Skonto Stadium, Riga
16:45 CET		Report	Joseph-Monrose 33'; Mangala 63'; Niang 86'	Referee: Szymon Marciniak (Poland)

Friendly

5 September 2011	Portugal	1 – 0	France	Estádio Municipal de Rio Maior, Rio Maior
22:15 CET	Eduardo 5'	Report

2013 UEFA European Under-21 Football Championship qualification

7 October 2011	France	2 – 0	Kazakhstan	Stade Gabriel Montpied, Clermont-Ferrand
16:45 CET	Guilavogui 26', 55'	Report		Referee: Kenn Hansen (Denmark)

11 October 2011	Romania	0 – 2	France	Stadionul Ceahlăul, Piatra Neamţ
18:00 CET		Report	Rivière 16', 43'	Referee: Aleksei Eskov (Russia)

11 November 2011	France	3 – 0	Romania	Stade de la Beaujoire, Nantes
20:45 CET	Cabella 37'; Lacazette 72'; Corchia 79'	Report		Referee: Roman Hrubeš (Czech Republic)

15 November 2011	France	2 – 0	Slovakia	Stade Jean-Bouin, Angers
20:45 CET	Mangala 33'; Varane 63'	Report		Referee: Artur Soares (Portugal)

Friendly

28 February 2012	France	1 – 1	Italy	Stade Pierre de Coubertin. Cannes
20:50 CET	Lacazette 29'	Report	Paloschi 69'	Referee: Alain Bieri (Switzerland)

2013 UEFA European Under-21 Football Championship qualification

2 June 2012	France	3 – 0	Latvia	Stade Louis Dugauguez, Sedan
20:50 CEST	Pajot 33' (pen.); Griezmann 56'; Joseph-Monrose 77'	Report		Referee: Suren Baliyan (Armenia)

8 June 2012	Kazakhstan	0 – 3	France	Astana Arena, Astana
16:45 CEST		Report	Cabella 14'; Griezmann 62'; Lacazette 85'	Referee: Oliver Drachta (Austria)

Last updated: 8 June 2012
Source: French Football Federation U-21 Schedule

=== France U-20 ===
Friendly

10 November 2011	Israel	2 – 1	France	Ramat Gan Stadium, Ramat Gan
19:00 CET	36'; 83'	Report	Knockaert 9'

13 November 2011	Israel	0 – 1	France	Ramat Gan Stadium, Ramat Gan
19:00 CET		Report	Belfodil 52'

29 February 2012	France	3 – 1	Finland	Stade Maurice Rigaud, Albi
16:30 CET	Aguemon 11'; Bourgeois 14'; Martial 43'	Report	Pohjanpalo 75'

2012 Toulon Tournament

24 May 2012	Belarus	1 – 3	France	Stade de Lattre, Aubagne
20:00 CET	Dragun 49'	Report	De Préville 8'; Mulumba 59'; Makengo 72'	Referee: Danny Makkelie (Netherlands)

26 May 2012	France	3 – 1	Mexico	Stade du Ray, Nice
20:00 CET	Germain 9'; De Préville 13'; Landre 60'	Report		Referee: Yudai Yamamoto (Japan)

28 May 2012	France	2 – 2	Morocco	Stade Marque, La Seyne
18:00 CET	Trebel 23'; Makengo 51' (pen.)	Report	Frikeche 54'; Feddal 71'	Referee: Danny Makkelie (Netherlands)

Semi-finals; 30 May 2012	France	0 – 1	Turkey	Parc des Sports, Avignon
20:00 CET		Report	Köse 19' (pen.)	Referee: Mounir Mabrouk (Morocco)

Third Place Match; 1 June 2012	France	2 – 3	Netherlands	Stade Perruc, Hyères
18:30 CET	De Préville 73'; Germain 76'	Report	Wijnaldum 3'; Barazite 38'; Ten Voorde 80'	Referee: Arellano Nieves (Mexico)

Last updated: 1 June 2012
Source: French Football Federation U-20 Schedule

=== France U-19 ===
Friendly

6 September 2011	Italy	1 – 3	France	Nuovo Stadio Comunale, Caravaggio
18:00 CET	24' (pen.)	Report	Bahebeck 4'; Plea 31'; Koura 68'

8 September 2011	Italy	0 – 1	France	Stadio Polisportivo Comunale, Rodengo-Saiano
10:30 CET		Report	Gouano 65'

Tournoi de Limoges

5 October 2011	France	2 – 2	England	Stade Beaublanc, Limoges
19:00 CET	Sanogo 41'; Bahebeck 87'	Report	Keane 21' (pen.); Robinson 76'

7 October 2011	France	2 – 1	Ukraine	Stade Beaublanc, Limoges
19:00 CET	Koura 49', 66'	Report	Tulach 58'

9 October 2011	France	1 – 2	Portugal	Stade Beaublanc, Limoges
19:00 CET	Plea 20'	Report	Betinho 10'; Alves 82'

Friendly

29 February 2012	France	1 – 2	Spain	Stade Alberto Corazza, Meaux
16:30 CET	Pogba 85'	Report	Rafinha 1'; Juanmi 58'

Porto Tournament

11 April 2012	Serbia	0 – 2	France	Estadio Rebordosa, Rebordosa
17:00 CET		Report	Ngando 47'; Le Pogam 54'	Referee: Davit Kharitonashvili (Georgia)

12 April 2012	France	0 – 3	Georgia	Estádio do Padroense, Matosinhos
17:00 CET		Report	Qazaishvili 44', 63', 85'	Referee: Marco Ferreira (Portugal)

14 April 2012	Portugal	0 – 0	France	Estádio Municipal Dr. José Vieira de Carvalho, Maia
11:00 CET		Report		Referee: Novak Simonic (Serbia)

2012 UEFA European Under-19 Football Championship Elite Round qualification

25 May 2012	France	2 – 1	Czech Republic	Na Chvalech, Prague
17:00 CEST	Bahebeck 48'; Vion 58'	Report	Lutonský 18'	Referee: Felix Zwayer (Germany)

27 May 2012	France	3 – 1	Norway	Na Chvalech, Prague
17:00 CEST	Bahebeck 30'; Bosetti 67' (pen.), 71'	Report	Skogsrud 36'	Referee: Anatoliy Abdula (Ukraine)

30 May 2012	Netherlands	0 – 6	France	Synot Tip Arena, Prague
17:00 CEST		Report	Kondogbia 5'; Digne 23'; Bahebeck 56'; Bosetti 56'; Pogba 61'; Vion 83'	Referee: Felix Zwayer (Germany)

2012 UEFA European Under-19 Football Championship

3 July 2012	Serbia	0 – 3	France	Rakvere Stadium, Rakvere
17:45 CEST		Report	Samnick 17'; Pogba 26' (pen.); Vion 32'	Referee: Arnold Hunter (Northern Ireland)

6 July 2012	France	1 – 0	Croatia	Haapsalu Stadium, Haapsalu
16:30 CEST	Foulquier 79'	Report		Referee: Vadims Direktorenko (Latvia)

Group stage 9 July 2012	France	1 – 2	England	Kadriorg Stadium, Tallinn
20:00 CEST	Veretout 31'	Report	Lundstram 16'; Kane 39'	Referee: Danny Makkelie (Netherlands)

Semi-finals; 12 July 2012	Spain	3 – 3 (a.e.t.) (4–2 p)	France	Lilleküla Stadium, Tallinn
16:45 CEST	Deulofeu 62', 112'; Alcácer 78'	Report	Umtiti 26', 90+1'; Pogba 117'	Referee: Arnold Hunter (Northern Ireland)
	Penalties
	Campaña (penalty missed); Suárez (penalty scored); Jesé (penalty scored); Alcácer (penalty scored); Deulofeu (penalty scored)		(penalty scored) Pogba; (penalty scored) Plea; (penalty missed) Umtiti; (penalty missed) Kondogbia

Last updated: 12 July 2012
Source: French Football Federation U-19 Schedule

=== France U-18 ===
Czech Republic Tournament

23 August 2011	Czech Republic	1 – 2	France	Šardice Stadium, Šardice
17:00 CET	Strada 31'	Report	Benzia 15', 65'

25 August 2011	France	1 – 2	Ukraine	Stadion Pod Búdama, Mutěnice
	Touré 37'	Report	53'; 75'

Third Place Match; 27 August 2011	Slovakia	1 – 3	France	Stadion Pod Búdama, Mutěnice
11:00 CET	Faško 40'	Report	Benzia 39', 69'; Sacko 79'

Friendly

11 October 2011	Slovakia	1 – 2	France	NTC Senec, Senec
16:00 CET	Faško 5'	Report	Benzia 24'; Haller 28'

13 October 2011	Slovakia	2 – 3	France	NTC Senec, Senec
11:00 CET	Brigand 52'; Števček 71'	Report	Ouassiero 16'; Benzia 40'; Haller 87'

7 February 2012	Greece	3 – 2	France	Araliki Stadium, Ierapetra
15:00 CET	Denis 55'; Ioannidis 88'; Soukas 90+1'	Report	Hunou 30'; Nangis 50'

9 February 2012	Greece	0 – 2	France	Araliki Stadium, Ierapetra
13:30 CET		Report	Rodrigues 55'; Sacko 72'

20 March 2012	Germany	2 – 0	France	Stadion im Nonnenholz, Weil am Rhein
15:30 CET	Kerk 70', 85'	Report		Referee: Matthia Jollenback (Germany)

22 March 2012	Germany	2 – 3	France	Elzstadion, Emmendingen
15:30 CET	Von Haacke 34'; Mende 43'	Report	Nguette 27'; Sacko 44'; Benzia 85'

22 May 2012	Finland	0 – 3	France	Töölön Pallokenttä, Helsinki
13:30 CET	Benzia 20', 41'; Constant 23'	Report

24 May 2012	Finland	1 – 3	France	Eerikkilä Sports Institute, Eerikkilä
12:00 CET		Report	Ouassiero 14'; Leghait 37'; Benzia 90+1'

Last updated: 24 May 2012
Source: French Football Federation

=== France U-17 ===
Friendly

27 September 2011	Ukraine	0 – 0	France	Bannikov Stadium, Kyiv
14:30 CET		Report

29 September 2011	Ukraine	2 – 2	France	Bannikov Stadium, Kyiv
14:30 CET	Minakian 34'; Timochenko 85'	Report	Saïd 55'; Labidi 60'

2012 UEFA European Under-17 Football Championship First Round qualification

28 October 2011	France	5 – 0	Faroe Islands	Stade Rodange, Rodange
16:30 CET	Martial 18', 48'; Labidi 22'; Brunard 28'; Chemlal 61'	Report		Referee: Thorvaldur Árnason (Iceland)

30 October 2011	Luxembourg	0 – 2	France	Kaerjenger Dribbel, Hautcharage
19:00 CET		Report	Chemlal 12', 55'	Referee: Miroslav Zelinka (Czech Republic)

2 November 2011	France	4 – 0	Northern Ireland	Kaerjenger Dribbel, Hautcharage
19:00 CET	Martial 14', 50', 64'; Fofana 20'	Report		Referee: Vlado Glodjović (Serbia)

2012 Algarve Cup

2 February 2012	Netherlands	1 – 0	France	Estádio Municipal Albufeira, Albufeira
16:00 CET	Aké 72'	Report		Referee: Lee Collins (England)

4 February 2012	Portugal	0 – 2	France	Complexo Desportivo Belavista, Parchal
16:00 CET		Report	Brunard 2'; Lemar 72'	Referee: Lee Collins (England)

6 February 2012	France	1 – 2	England	Estádio Municipal Fernando Cabrita, Lagos
16:00 CET	Martial 32'	Report	Chambers 17'; Robinson 81'	Referee: Van Beijsterveld (Netherlands)

2012 UEFA European Under-17 Football Championship Elite Round qualification

24 March 2012	France	1 – 0	Italy	Stade Guy Boniface, Mont-de-Marsan
15:00 CET	Chemlal 71'	Report		Referee: Vitali Meshkov (Russia)

26 March 2012	France	2 – 1	Switzerland	Stade André Darrigade, Dax
18:00 CET	Corentin 19'; Martial 40+2'	Report	Tarashaj 68'	Referee: Orel Grinfeld (Israel)

29 March 2012	Sweden	1 – 3	France	Stade Guy Boniface, Mont-de-Marsan
18:00 CET	Zeneli 70'	Report	Corentin 40'; Martial 62'; Saïd 73'	Referee: Aleksandrs Anufrijevs (Latvia)

2012 UEFA European Under-17 Football Championship

4 May 2012	France	2 – 2	Iceland	Sports Park, Domžale
20:30 CET	Chemlal 7'; Martial 56'	Report	Birgisson 66'; Hermannsson 77'	Referee: Alan Mario Sant (Malta)

7 May 2012	France	1 – 1	Georgia	Sports Park, Domžale
17:30 CET	Lemar 67'	Report	Chechelasvili 30' (pen.)	Referee: Harald Lechner (Austria)

10 May 2012	Germany	3 – 0	France	Stožice Stadium, Ljubljana
19:30 CET	Meyer 54', 56'; Dittgen 62'	Report		Referee: Marius Avram (Romania)

Last updated: 10 May 2012
Source: French Football Federation U-17 Schedule

=== France U-16 ===
Friendly

20 September 2011	France	4 – 0	Wales	Stade Kechiloa, Saint-Jean-de-Luz
19:00 CET	Ntcham 1'; Cornet 6'; Mayard 50'; 75' (o.g.)	Report

22 September 2011	France	4 – 2	Wales	Stade Municipal de Mourenx, Mourenx
19:00 CET	Cornet 4'; Mayard 18', 27'; Sambissa 63'	Report	41'; 42'

2011 Tournoi du Val-de-Marne

25 October 2011	France	3 – 0	United States	Parc Omnisports, Sucy-en-Brie
14:00 CET	Araai 13'; Ntcham 38'; Maulun 74'	Report

27 October 2011	France	4 – 1	Netherlands	Parc des Sports des Maisons, Bry-sur-Marne
16:00 CET	Dembélé 35'; Cornet 44'; Ntcham 51'; Maupay 73'	Report	Donald 30'

29 October 2011	France	3 – 0	Peru	Complexe Sportif Léo-Lagrange, Bonneuil-sur-Marne
16:00 CET	Araai 37'; Maupay 50'; Cornet 61'	Report

2011 Nike International Tournament

30 November 2011	United States	2 – 2	France	Premier Sports Campus, Lakewood Ranch, Florida
23:00 CET	Robinson 25'; Wade 90+3'	Report	Araai 43'; Turner 75' (o.g.)	Attendance: 300; Referee: Mark Declouet (United States)

2 December 2011	France	1 – 1	Brazil	Premier Sports Campus, Lakewood Ranch, Florida
20:00 CET	Maupay 77'	Report	Abner 19'	Attendance: 650; Referee: Alejandro Mariscal (United States)

4 December 2011	France	3 – 3	Turkey	Premier Sports Campus, Lakewood Ranch, Florida
20:00 CET	Maupay 22'; Cornet 58'; Coulibaly 90+6'	Report	Alintas 13', 39'; Ceylan 48'	Attendance: 500; Referee: John McCloskey (United States)

2012 Aegean Cup

17 January 2012	France	3 – 3	Ukraine	Akhisar İlçe Stadium, Akhisar
13:00 CET	Maupay 34'; Sambissa 38'; Nnomo 70'	Report	Arendaruk 21'; Kovalenko 22'; Nechay 29'

18 January 2012	France	2 – 1	Belgium	Sardis Stadium, Sardis
13:00 CET	Guirassy 36'; Kılıç 42'	Report	71'

20 January 2012	France	3 – 0	Greece	7 Eylül Stadium, Turgutlu
13:00 CET	Ntcham 10'; Maupay 22'; Nnomo 65'	Report

Final; 20 January 2012	France	1 – 1 (4–2 p)	Turkey	7 Eylül Stadium, Turgutlu
13:00 CET	Ntcham 58'	Report	Furkan 29'

Friendly

6 March 2012	Italy	1 – 1	France	FIGC Training Center, Coverciano
15:00 CET	Fabbro 82'	Report	Massoni 60'

8 March 2012	Italy	0 – 1	France	Stadio Comunale Torrini, Sesto Fiorentino
11:00 CET		Report	Dembélé 51'

2012 Montaigu Tournament

3 April 2012	France	3 – 1	Mexico	Stade Maxime Bossis, Montaigu
19:30 CET	Pereira de Sa 49', 59', 69'	Report	Diaz 73'	Referee: Gérard Dany (France)

5 April 2012	France	3 – 0	Foot Solidaire Afrique	Stade Maxime Bossis, Montaigu
19:00 CET	Dembélé 6'; Macalou 22'; Pereira de Sa 68'	Report		Referee: Florent Baconnet (France)

7 April 2012	France	3 – 3; 5–6 pen.	Portugal	Stade Maxime Bossis, Montaigu
15:00 CET	Pereira de Sa 5'; Maupay 25'; Coman 65'	Report	Diogo 26'; Postiga 55'; Sergio Ribeiro 83'	Referee: Philippe Vinche (Belgium)

9 April 2012	France	0 – 1	England	Stade Maxime Bossis, Montaigu
14:30 CET		Report	Sinclair 35'	Referee: Gérard Dany (France)

Friendly

30 May 2012	France	1 – 2	Germany	Stade Jean-Antoine Moueix, Libourne
16:00 CEST	Dembélé 34'	Report	Bodenröder 60'; Pflücke 70'

Last updated: 30 May 2012
Source: French Football Federation U-16 Schedule
