= 2011–12 Championnat National =

Championnat National
- Season: 2011–12
- Champions: Nîmes
- Promoted: Niort; Gazélec Ajaccio
- Relegated: Beauvais; Martigues; Besançon; Bayonne
- Matches: 380
- Goals: 977 (2.57 per match)
- Top goalscorer: Seydou Koné (17 goals)
- Biggest home win: Paris 6–0 Épinal (12 October 2011)
- Biggest away win: Paris 0–4 Red Star (15 September 2011); Orléans 1–5 Niort (2 December 2011)
- Highest scoring: Cherbourg 4–5 Gazélec Ajaccio (4 May 2012); Besançon 4–5 Rouen (26 May 2012)
- Longest winning run: 5 games Rouen (12 August – 10 September)
- Longest unbeaten run: 9 games Épinal (6 August – 24 September)
- Longest winless run: 13 games Martigues (7 October – 17 February)
- Longest losing run: 7 games Red Star (20 September – 4 November)

The 2011–12 Championnat National season was the 14th since its establishment. The previous season's champions was Bastia. The league schedule was announced on 16 May 2011 and the fixtures were determined in July. The season began on 6 August 2011 and ended on 26 May 2012. The winter break was in effect from 23 December to 6 January.

== Teams ==
Location of teams in 2011–12 Championnat National

There will be four promoted teams from the Championnat de France amateur, the fourth division of French football, replacing the five teams that were relegated from the Championnat National following the 2010–11 season. A total of 20 teams will compete in the league with four clubs suffering relegation to the Championnat de France amateur. All clubs that secure league status for the season will be subject to approval by the DNCG before becoming eligible to participate.

Grenoble became the first professional club to fall to the Championnat National from Ligue 2. The club's drop occurred on 13 May 2011 without it even playing a match following positive results from clubs Grenoble had been trailing in the table. Grenoble will be returning to the third division after playing over a decade under the Ligue de Football Professionnel emblem in Ligue 1 and Ligue 2. On 20 May, both Nîmes and Vannes completed the trio of Ligue 2 clubs dropping down to the third division. Nîmes will be returning to National after three seasons playing in Ligue 2, while Vannes will regress back to the third division after two seasons.

On 7 May 2011, despite having the week off, Le Poiré-sur-Vie became the first club from the Championnat de France amateur to achieve promotion from the fourth division to the Championnat National. The club's spot in the third division was confirmed following second-place Les Herbiers' 0–0 draw with the reserve team of professional club Lorient. Le Poiré-sur-Vie will be making its debut in the third division having spent, aside from six seasons in the fifth and fourth division, its entire history languishing in the regional leagues of Centre-Ouest and Atlantique. Two weeks later, both Besançon and Gazélec Ajaccio were promoted to the Championnat National after recording victories during the match day. Besançon will be returning to the third division after spending six seasons in the Championnat de France amateur, while Gazélec will be returning to the league after spending four seasons in the fourth division. On the final day of the season, Quevilly became the final club in the CFA to earn promotion to National after drawing with Poissy. Despite drawing, the two points Quevilly earned from the match was enough to edge Red Star Paris, which also drew during the week.

Teams relegated to Championnat National

- Vannes
- Nîmes
- Grenoble

Teams promoted to Championnat National

- Besançon
- Cherbourg (Note: Promoted to the Championat National as a result of Gap's administrative relegation.)
- Épinal (Note: Promoted to the Championat National as a result of Grenoble's administrative relegation after the club entered liquidation.)
- Gazélec Ajaccio
- Le Poiré-sur-Vie
- Martigues (Note: Promoted to the Championat National as a result of Cannes' administrative relegation.)
- Quevilly
- Red Star (Note: Promoted to the Championat National as a result of Strasbourg's administrative relegation.)

=== DNCG rulings ===
On 26 May 2011, following a preliminary review of each club's administrative and financial accounts in the Championnat National, the DNCG ruled that Pacy Vallée-d'Eure, Strasbourg, Gap, Grenoble, and Cannes would be relegated to the Championnat de France amateur after the organisation determined that the clubs were enduring financial difficulties. The clubs had the option to appeal the ruling. On 24 June 2011, Pacy Vallée-d'Eure officials confirmed in a press conference that it would accept its relegation to the fourth division in an effort to smooth over its €350,000 debt into next year. Two weeks later, Grenoble confirmed on its website that the Appeals Board of the DNCG had informed club officials that it will be relegated to the fourth division. Grenoble, subsequently, entered liquidation on 7 July. On 13 July, Grenoble's relegation was validated after the French Football Federation confirmed via letter to SAS Épinal that the club would be replacing Grenoble in the Championnat National.

On 8 July 2011, the Appeals Board of the DNCG confirmed that both Strasbourg and Gap would remain relegated after the clubs failed to convince the board of its intent to fix its financial liabilities. Strasbourg has a deficit of over €4 million, while Gap's debt has exceeded over €80,000. Following the appeal denial, Gap officials announced that the club would appeal to the CNOSF, the National Sporting Committee of France. On 18 July, despite both clubs still having the option to appeal the DNCG rulings, the Ligue du Football Amateur (LFA) announced that Red Star and Cherbourg would replace Strasbourg and Gap, respectively, for the 2011–12 edition of the Championnat National. On the following day, Cannes had its appeal to remain in the Championnat National rejected by the DNCG. Similar to Gap, following the decision, Cannes announced its intent to appeal the ruling at the CNOSF. On 29 July, the CNOSF gave a favourable ruling for Cannes recommending to the federation that Cannes should remain in the third division. On 3 August, the CNOSF ruled Gap confirmed the demotion of Gap to the Championnat de France amateur. The French Football Federation determined whether Cannes would be allowed to participate in the league on 4 August, one day before the season was set to begin at the federation's annual executive meeting. At the meeting, the Federation re-affirmed its decision to relegate Cannes to the CFA stating it "trust the DNCG and followed its decisions".

=== Stadia and locations ===
Club	Location	Venue	Capacity	Average attendance
Bayonne	Bayonne	Stade Didier Deschamps	3,500	377
Beauvais	Beauvais	Stade Pierre Brisson	10,178	926
Besançon	Besançon	Stade Léo Lagrange	10,500	1,798
Cherbourg	Cherbourg-Octeville	Stade Maurice Postaire	7,000	1,372
Colmar	Colmar	Colmar Stadium	7,000	1,921
Créteil	Créteil	Stade Dominique Duvauchelle	12,150	424
Épinal	Épinal	Stade de la Colombière	8,000	1,643
Fréjus	Fréjus	Stade Pourcin	2,500	1,540
Gazélec Ajaccio	Ajaccio	Stade Ange Casanova	8,000	1,392
Le Poiré-sur-Vie	Le Poiré-sur-Vie	Stade de l'Idonnière	1,950	2,032
Luzenac	Luzenac	Stade Paul Fédou	1,000	495
Martigues	Martigues	Stade Francis Turcan	11,500	546
Nîmes	Nîmes	Stade des Costières	18,482	4,952
Niort	Niort	Stade René Gaillard	10,898	3,775
Orléans	Orléans	Stade de la Source	6,000	1,663
Paris	Paris	Stade Sébastien Charléty	20,000	384
Quevilly	Le Petit-Quevilly	Stade Lozai	2,500	1,143
Red Star	Saint-Ouen	Stade Bauer	10,000	1,325
Rouen	Rouen	Stade Robert Diochon	10,000	3,236
Vannes	Vannes	Stade de la Rabine	8,000	3,107

=== Personnel and kits ===
Note: Flags indicate national team as has been defined under FIFA eligibility rules. Players and managers may hold more than one non-FIFA nationality.

Team	Manager^{1}	Captain^{1}	Kit Manufacturer^{1}	Main Sponsor^{1}
Bayonne	Alain Pochat	Michel Bidegain	Duarig	Forge Adour
Beauvais	Alex Clément	Léonard Mendy	Erreà	Odalys Vacances
Besançon	Hervé Genet	Julien Perrin	Kappa	Eiffage
Cherbourg	Jean-Marie Huriez	Loïc Binet	Nike	Maîtres Laitiers du Cotentin
Colmar	Damien Ott	Sylvain Meslien	Nike	Patrick Sports
Créteil	Jean-Luc Vasseur	Sebastien Gondouin	Nike	SFB Béton
Épinal	Fabien Tossot	Abdellah Asbabou	Nike	Fromages Ermitage
Fréjus	Charly Paquille	Vincent Fernandez	Lotto	Géant
Gazélec Ajaccio	Dominique Veilex	Anthony Colinet	Erreà	Casino d'Ajaccio
Le Poiré-sur-Vie	Oswald Tanchot	Ludovic Pallier	Nike	Yves Cougnaud
Luzenac	Christophe Pélissier	Sébastien Mignotte	Erreà	Groupe Scopelec
Martigues	Jean-Luc Vannuchi	Jonathan Di Maria	Nike	Madewis
Nîmes	Thierry Froger	Benoît Poulain	Erreà	Mac Dan
Niort	Pascal Gastien	Vincent Durand	Erreà	Cheminées Poujoulat
Orléans	Yann Lachuer	Yozip Lemée	Umbro	CTVL
Paris	Alain Mboma	Ibrahima Fayé	Nike	Nexity
Quevilly	Régis Brouard	Frédéric Weis	Nike	Matmut
Red Star	Vincent Doukantié	Bertrand Abissonono	Adidas	
Rouen	Emmanuel da Costa	Pierre Vignaud	Hummel	Promaritime International
Vannes	Stéphane Le Mignan	Patrick Leugueun	Adidas	Breizh Cola

^{1} Subject to change prior to the start of the season.

=== Managerial changes ===
Team	Outgoing head coach	Manner of departure	Date of vacancy	Position in table	Incoming head coach	Date of appointment	Position in table
Le Poiré-sur-Vie	Alain Ferrand	Resigned	11 May 2011	Off-season	Oswald Tanchot	11 May 2011	Off-season
Fréjus Saint-Raphaël	Athos Bandini	Sacked	27 May 2011	Off-season	Franck Priou	3 June 2011	Off-season
Paris	Jean-Luc Vannuchi	Sacked	27 May 2011	Off-season	Alain Mboma	7 June 2011	Off-season
Cannes	Victor Zvunka	Mutual consent	27 May 2011	Off-season	David Guion	7 June 2011	Off-season
Martigues	Franck Priou	Joined Fréjus	3 June 2011	Off-season	Jérôme Erceau	9 June 2011	Off-season
Créteil	Hubert Velud	Resigned	22 May 2011	Off-season	Jean-Luc Vasseur	9 June 2011	Off-season
Red Star	Alain Mboma	Joined Paris	7 June 2011	Off-season	Athos Bandini	10 June 2011	Off-season
Red Star	Athos Bandini	Fired	13 October 2011	18th	Vincent Doukantié	13 October 2011	18th
Fréjus	Franck Priou	Fired	7 December 2011	10th	Charly Paquille	7 December 2011	10th
Martigues	Jérôme Erceau	Fired	13 February 2012	18th	Jean-Luc Vannuchi	15 February 2012	18th
Rouen	Éric Garcin	Fired	14 March 2012	8th	Emmanuel da Costa	14 March 2012	8th

== League table ==
Pos	Team	Pld	W	D	L	GF	GA	GD	Pts	Promotion or Relegation
1	Nîmes (C, P)	38	18	14	6	65	38	+27	68	Promotion to Ligue 2
2	Niort (P)	38	19	10	9	61	33	+28	67	Promotion to Ligue 2
3	Gazélec Ajaccio (Note: Gazélec Ajaccio was docked four points, two of them suspended, after being found guilty of its inability to control its players and supporters. The deduction came as a result of a fight that broke out between the club's players and its supporters during a September match against Beauvais.) (P)	38	20	8	10	57	32	+25	66	Promotion to Ligue 2
4	Vannes	38	16	14	8	55	38	+17	62	
5	Épinal	38	17	11	10	61	47	+14	62	
6	Rouen	38	17	9	12	48	46	+2	60	
7	Orléans	38	15	11	12	41	41	0	56	
8	Colmar	38	15	10	13	54	44	+10	55	
9	Fréjus	38	15	6	17	50	58	−8	51	
10	Créteil	38	13	11	14	51	50	+1	50	
11	Red Star	38	15	5	18	44	52	−8	50	
12	Le Poiré-sur-Vie	38	14	7	17	41	46	−5	49	
13	Quevilly	38	12	11	15	45	54	−9	47	
14	Cherbourg	38	11	13	14	56	57	−1	46	
15	Luzenac	38	11	12	15	47	56	−9	45	
16	Paris	38	12	8	18	39	48	−9	44	
17	Beauvais (R)	38	8	18	12	39	43	−4	42	Relegation to Championnat de France amateur
18	Martigues (R)	38	9	12	17	43	69	−26	39	Relegation to Championnat de France amateur
19	Besançon (Note: Besançon were docked three points.) (D, R)	38	9	11	18	42	64	−22	35	Relegation to Division d'Honneur Régionale
20	Bayonne (R)	38	7	13	18	38	60	−22	34	Relegation to Championnat de France amateur

Source: French Football Federation
Rules for classification: 1) points; 2) goal difference; 3) number of goals scored.
(C) Champions; (D) Disqualified; (P) Promoted; (R) Relegated

== Results ==
Home \ Away	BAY	BEA	BSC	CHB	COL	CRE	EPI	FRE	GAZ	LPV	LUZ	MRT	NRT	NMS	ORL	PAR	QUE	RSFC	ROU	VAN
Bayonne		0–2	1–1	0–0	2–2	0–1	2–1	1–1	1–0	1–0	2–3	5–3	1–1	2–1	0–2	2–2	2–2	2–1	0–1	0–3
Beauvais	2–0		0–0	1–1	2–3	1–1	3–4	0–1	2–1	1–2	2–0	0–0	2–2	1–2	1–3	2–0	1–1	4–2	0–1	0–0
Besançon	3–2	1–1		1–2	2–1	3–2	1–1	3–2	1–1	2–1	0–1	2–2	1–1	1–1	3–2	2–1	1–2	0–0	4–5	0–2
Cherbourg	1–1	2–2	6–2		0–2	0–0	1–0	1–0	4–5	1–2	4–1	1–2	1–2	1–1	1–2	2–0	1–2	2–0	0–1	1–0
Colmar	1–1	4–0	3–0	0–0		2–1	1–0	2–1	0–2	4–1	1–1	3–0	2–2	0–0	2–0	3–0	1–3	0–1	0–0	0–0
Créteil	4–3	1–0	0–2	0–1	0–3		1–1	1–1	2–1	0–1	2–2	4–0	1–2	0–2	3–0	1–1	2–1	1–0	2–3	1–1
Épinal	1–1	0–0	2–1	3–3	3–0	5–1		4–0	1–1	1–1	2–0	2–0	2–1	2–2	1–3	2–1	0–1	0–2	3–2	2–2
Fréjus	2–0	3–1	4–2	1–0	2–3	0–4	1–2		2–1	2–5	0–0	1–0	0–0	2–0	3–0	1–0	2–0	2–3	2–0	3–2
Gazélec Ajaccio	2–0	0–0	2–0	5–0	1–0	0–1	2–1	1–0		2–0	1–1	2–0	0–1	2–1	1–0	1–0	0–0	1–1	4–1	2–1
Le Poiré-sur-Vie	1–1	0–0	1–0	1–1	0–2	0–1	1–2	2–0	3–1		1–0	5–0	1–0	0–3	1–1	1–1	2–1	0–2	1–1	2–1
Luzenac	1–0	0–0	2–0	3–2	1–1	1–1	0–2	1–1	0–0	1–2		3–3	1–1	0–3	0–1	2–0	3–1	2–0	2–0	2–2
Martigues	1–1	2–3	2–0	3–3	2–1	2–1	2–1	3–2	2–3	2–1	0–3		2–1	1–1	0–0	0–1	1–1	0–1	0–2	1–1
Niort	4–0	0–2	3–0	2–0	2–1	0–2	0–0	2–0	2–1	1–0	4–0	3–1		1–1	0–1	0–2	2–0	4–0	3–0	0–0
Nîmes	1–0	1–1	3–0	0–0	2–0	3–3	1–1	4–1	0–0	2–0	3–2	4–1	3–2		1–1	2–1	3–0	3–4	1–2	1–2
Orléans	1–1	2–0	2–0	3–2	1–0	0–1	1–2	0–0	1–0	2–1	2–0	0–0	1–5	1–1		0–0	0–1	2–1	0–0	2–2
Paris	2–1	0–0	0–0	1–3	2–4	1–0	6–0	2–0	0–3	1–0	3–1	1–2	0–1	0–1	1–0		2–0	0–4	2–1	2–0
Quevilly	2–0	1–0	1–1	4–2	4–0	1–1	0–3	0–1	0–3	0–1	2–5	1–1	0–2	1–3	1–1	2–2		1–1	2–3	2–0
Red Star	1–2	0–0	1–0	0–2	1–0	2–1	0–3	1–2	0–2	2–0	3–1	2–1	1–2	1–2	1–2	0–0	0–1		2–1	2–0
Rouen	0–0	1–1	0–0	3–3	1–1	1–0	0–1	4–3	0–1	2–0	2–0	2–0	2–2	0–1	2–1	1–0	0–2	2–1		1–0
Vannes	2–0	1–1	2–1	1–1	3–1	3–3	1–0	3–1	3–2	1–0	2–0	1–1	1–0	1–1	2–0	3–1	1–1	4–0	1–0	

Source: French Football Federation
Legend: Blue = home team win; Yellow = draw; Red = away team win.

== Statistics ==
=== Top goalscorers ===
Rank	Player	Club	Goals
1	Seydou Koné	Nîmes	17
2	Nicolas Belvito	Cherbourg	14
2	Abdellah Asbabou	Épinal	14
2	Geoffrey Malfleury	Red Star Saint-Ouen	14
5	Nicolas Verdier	Gazélec Ajaccio	13
5	Jean-Michel Lesage	Créteil	13
7	Julien Jahier	Épinal	12
7	Mathieu Scarpelli	Fréjus	12
7	El Fardou Ben Nabouhane	Vannes	12
10	Vincent Créhin	Beauvais	10

Last updated: 3 May 2012
Source: Official Goalscorers' Standings
