= 2001–02 Le Mans UC72 season =

Le Mans
2001–02 season
- Manager: Thierry Goudet
- Stadium: Stade Léon-Bollée
- French Division 2: 5th
- Coupe de France: Round of 64
- Coupe de la Ligue: Round of 32

The 2001–02 season was the 17th season in the existence of Le Mans UC72 and the club's third consecutive season in the second division of French football. In addition to the domestic league, Le Mans competed in this season's edition of the Coupe de France and Coupe de la Ligue. The season covered the period from 1 July 2001 to 30 June 2002.

== Players ==
=== First-team squad ===
Note: Flags indicate national team as defined under FIFA eligibility rules; some limited exceptions apply. Players may hold more than one non-FIFA nationality.

No.	Pos.	Nation	Player
—	GK	(France) FRA	Jean-François Bedenik
—	GK	(France) FRA	Olivier Pédemas
—	DF	(France) FRA	Jérôme Erceau
—	DF	(France) FRA	Claude Fichaux
—	DF	(France) FRA	Yoann Poulard
—	DF	(France) FRA	Willy Bolivard
—	DF	(France) FRA	Laurent Bonnart
—	DF	(France) FRA	Didier Lang
—	DF	(France) FRA	Damien Bridonneau
—	DF	(France) FRA	Philippe Correia
—	DF	(France) FRA	Denis Arnaud
—	DF	(France) FRA	David Charrièras

No.	Pos.	Nation	Player
—	MF	(France) FRA	Frédéric Thomas
—	MF	(France) FRA	Mohamed Haddadou
—	MF	(France) FRA	Jérôme Drouin
—	MF	(France) FRA	Yohan Hautcoeur
—	MF	(France) FRA	Grégory Louiron
—	MF	(Martinique) MTQ	Olivier Thomert
—	MF	(France) FRA	James Fanchone
—	FW	(Gabon) GAB	Daniel Cousin
—	FW	(France) FRA	Stéphane Samson
—	FW	(Ivory Coast) CIV	Didier Drogba
—	FW	(France) FRA	Yohann Rangdet

== Competitions ==
Win Draw Loss

=== Overall record ===
Competition	First match	Last match	Starting round	Final position	Record							
Competition	First match	Last match	Starting round	Final position	Pld	W	D	L	GF	GA	GD	Win %
Division 2	28 July 2001	3 May 2002	Matchday 1	5th	38	16	10	12	48	41	+7	42.11
Coupe de France	November 2001	TBD	Seventh round	Round of 64	3	2	0	1	10	3	+7	66.67
Coupe de la Ligue	September 2001	TBD	First round	Round of 32	2	1	0	1	4	4	+0	50.00
Total					43	19	10	14	62	48	+14	44.19

Source: Competitions

=== French Division 2 ===
==== League table ====
Pos	Team	Pld	W	D	L	GF	GA	GD	Pts	Promotion or Relegation
3	Nice (P)	38	20	6	12	56	40	+16	66	Promotion to Ligue 1
4	Le Havre (P)	38	17	14	7	56	32	+24	65	Promotion to Ligue 1
5	Le Mans	38	16	10	12	48	41	+7	58	
6	Caen	38	16	10	12	59	55	+4	58	
7	Beauvais	38	13	18	7	37	25	+12	57	

Source: Ligue 2
(P) Promoted

==== Results summary ====
Overall								Home						Away					
Pld	W	D	L	GF	GA	GD	Pts	W	D	L	GF	GA	GD	W	D	L	GF	GA	GD
38	16	10	12	48	41	+7	58	11	4	4	28	18	+10	5	6	8	20	23	−3

Source: Ligue 2

==== Results by round ====
Round	1	2	3	4	5	6	7	8	9	10	11	12	13	14	15	16	17	18	19	20	21	22	23	24	25	26	27	28	29	30	31	32	33	34	35	36	37	38
Ground	H	A	A	H	A	H	A	H	A	H	A	H	A	H	A	H	A	H	A	H	H	A	H	A	H	A	H	A	H	A	H	A	H	A	H	A	H	A
Result	L	D	D	D	L	W	D	D	L	L	W	W	L	W	L	D	W	W	L	W	W	D	W	D	L	W	W	W	D	L	W	L	W	D	W	W	L	L
Position	17	17	17	14	15	13	12	13	17	20	14	13	14	12	12	13	13	11	12	11	7	7	6	6	7	6	5	5	6	6	6	6	6	6	6	5	5	5

Source: Ligue 2
A = Away; H = Home; W = Win; D = Draw; L = Loss

==== Matches ====
	Le Mans	v	Ajaccio	Le Mans
--:-- CEST (UTC+2)				Stadium: Stade Léon-Bollée

	Ajaccio	v	Le Mans	Ajaccio
--:-- CEST (UTC+2)				Stadium: Stade François Coty

	Le Mans	v	Amiens	Le Mans
--:-- CEST (UTC+2)				Stadium: Stade Léon-Bollée

	Amiens	v	Le Mans	Amiens
--:-- CEST (UTC+2)				Stadium: Stade de la Licorne

	Le Mans	v	Beauvais	Le Mans
--:-- CEST (UTC+2)				Stadium: Stade Léon-Bollée

	Beauvais	v	Le Mans	Beauvais
--:-- CEST (UTC+2)				Stadium: Stade Pierre Brisson

	Le Mans	v	Caen	Le Mans
--:-- CEST (UTC+2)				Stadium: Stade Léon-Bollée

	Caen	v	Le Mans	Caen
--:-- CEST (UTC+2)				Stadium: Stade Michel d'Ornano

	Le Mans	v	Châteauroux	Le Mans
--:-- CEST (UTC+2)				Stadium: Stade Léon-Bollée

	Châteauroux	v	Le Mans	Châteauroux
--:-- CEST (UTC+2)				Stadium: Stade Gaston-Petit

	Le Mans	v	Créteil	Le Mans
--:-- CEST (UTC+2)				Stadium: Stade Léon-Bollée

	Créteil	v	Le Mans	Créteil
--:-- CEST (UTC+2)				Stadium: Stade Dominique Duvauchelle

	Le Mans	v	Grenoble	Le Mans
--:-- CEST (UTC+2)				Stadium: Stade Léon-Bollée

	Grenoble	v	Le Mans	Grenoble
--:-- CEST (UTC+2)				Stadium: Stade Lesdiguières

	Le Mans	v	Gueugnon	Le Mans
--:-- CEST (UTC+2)				Stadium: Stade Jules Deschaseaux

	Gueugnon	v	Le Mans	Gueugnon
--:-- CEST (UTC+2)				Stadium: Stade Jean Laville

	Le Mans	v	Istres	Le Mans
--:-- CEST (UTC+2)				Stadium: Stade Léon-Bollée

	Istres	v	Le Mans	Istres
--:-- CEST (UTC+2)				Stadium: Stade Bernard Bardin

	Le Mans	v	Laval	Le Mans
--:-- CEST (UTC+2)				Stadium: Stade Léon-Bollée

	Laval	v	Le Mans	Laval
--:-- CEST (UTC+2)				Stadium: Stade Francis Le Basser

	Le Mans	v	Le Havre	Le Mans
--:-- CEST (UTC+2)				Stadium: Stade Léon-Bollée

	Le Havre	v	Le Mans	Le Havre
--:-- CEST (UTC+2)				Stadium: Stade Jules Deschaseaux

	Le Mans	v	Martigues	Le Mans
--:-- CEST (UTC+2)				Stadium: Stade Léon-Bollée

	Martigues	v	Le Mans	Martigues
--:-- CEST (UTC+2)				Stadium: Stade Francis Turcan

	Le Mans	v	Nancy	Le Mans
--:-- CEST (UTC+2)				Stadium: Stade Léon-Bollée

	Nancy	v	Le Mans	Tomblaine
--:-- CEST (UTC+2)				Stadium: Stade Marcel Picot

	Le Mans	v	Nice	Le Mans
--:-- CEST (UTC+2)				Stadium: Stade Léon-Bollée

	Nice	v	Le Mans	Nice
--:-- CEST (UTC+2)				Stadium: Stade du Ray

	Le Mans	v	Nîmes	Le Mans
--:-- CEST (UTC+2)				Stadium: Stade Léon-Bollée

	Nîmes	v	Le Mans	Nîmes
--:-- CEST (UTC+2)				Stadium: Stade des Costières

	Le Mans	v	Niort	Le Mans
--:-- CEST (UTC+2)				Stadium: Stade Léon-Bollée

	Niort	v	Le Mans	Niort
--:-- CEST (UTC+2)				Stadium: Stade René Gaillard

	Le Mans	v	Saint-Étienne	Le Mans
--:-- CEST (UTC+2)				Stadium: Stade Léon-Bollée

	Saint-Étienne	v	Le Mans	Saint-Étienne
--:-- CEST (UTC+2)				Stadium: Stade Geoffroy-Guichard

	Le Mans	v	Strasbourg	Le Mans
--:-- CEST (UTC+2)				Stadium: Stade Léon-Bollée

	Strasbourg	v	Le Mans	Strasbourg
--:-- CEST (UTC+2)				Stadium: Stade de la Meinau

	Le Mans	v	Wasquehal	Le Mans
--:-- CEST (UTC+2)				Stadium: Stade Léon-Bollée

	Wasquehal	v	Le Mans	Villeneuve-d'Ascq
--:-- CEST (UTC+2)				Stadium: Stadium Lille Métropole

== Statistics ==
=== Squad statistics ===
No.	Pos	Nat	Player	Total		Division 2		Coupe de France		Coupe de la Ligue			
No.	Pos	Nat	Player	Apps	Goals	Apps	Goals	Apps	Goals	Apps	Goals		
Goalkeepers
1	GK	(France) FRA	[[]]	0	0	0	0	0	0	0	0	0	0
1	GK	(France) FRA	[[]]	0	0	0	0	0	0	0	0	0	0
Defenders
1	DF	(France) FRA	[[]]	0	0	0	0	0	0	0	0	0	0
1	DF	(France) FRA	[[]]	0	0	0	0	0	0	0	0	0	0
Midfielders
1	MF	(France) FRA	[[]]	0	0	0	0	0	0	0	0	0	0
1	MF	(France) FRA	[[]]	0	0	0	0	0	0	0	0	0	0
Forwards
1	FW	(France) FRA	[[]]	0	0	0	0	0	0	0	0	0	0
1	FW	(France) FRA	[[]]	0	0	0	0	0	0	0	0	0	0
Players who have made an appearance or had a squad number this season but have left the club
1	GK	(France) FRA	[[]]	0	0	0	0	0	0	0	0	0	0

=== Goalscorers ===
Rank	No.	Pos	Nat	Name	Division 2	Coupe de France	Coupe de la Ligue	Total	
1	1	FW	(France)	[[]]	0	0	0	0	
2	2	MF	(France)	[[]]	0	0	0	0	
2	Totals					0	0	0	0
