= Rachidi =

Rachidi is a surname. Notable people with the name include:

- Ahmed Rashidi, also known as Ahmed Errachid (born 1966), Moroccan extrajudicial prisoners of the United States
- Farhad Rachidi (born 1962), Iranian-Swiss scientist
- Hassan Rachidi (born 1957), Moroccan journalist and director of Al Jazeera in Morocco
- Ibrahim Rachidi (born 1980), French footballer
- Said Rachidi (born 1986), Moroccan boxer
- Younès Rachidi (born 1986), Moroccan tennis player
- Rodney Rachidi (born 2001), South African
