= Di Maria =

Di Maria (or Di María/DiMaria) is a surname. Notable people with the surname include:

- Ángel Di María (born 1988), Argentine footballer
- Anthony DiMaria (born 1966), American actor
- Antonio Di Maria (born 1971), Italian politician
- Arnaldo Di Maria (1935–2011), Italian racing cyclist
- Carlo Di Maria (1904–), Italian architect
- Francesco di Maria (1623–1690), Italian painter
- Jeff DiMaria (born 1977), American footballer
- Jolanda di Maria Petris (1916–1987), Italian-Finnish operatic soprano
- Jonathan Di Maria (born 1983), French footballer
- Leonard DiMaria (born 1941), American mobster
- Sarah Jodoin Di Maria (born 2000), Canadian-Italian diver
- Tommaso di Maria Allery Monterosato (1841–1927), Italian malacologist
