= Dominique Veilex =

French footballer (born 1960)

Personal information
- Full name: Dominique Veilex
- Date of birth: 1 January 1960 (age 66)
- Place of birth: Orange, France

Youth career
- 1966–1975: Orange
- 1975–1976: INF Vichy

Senior career*
Years	Team	Apps	(Gls)
1976–1979	Cannes		
1979–1982	Orange		
1982–1985	Saint-Raphaël		
1985–1988	Fréjus		

Managerial career
- 1997–2000: Saint-Raphaël
- 2000–2002: Grasse
- 2003–2005: SC Draguignan
- 2006–2007: AS Porto Vecchio
- 2008–2009: Le Pontet
- 2010–2012: Gazélec Ajaccio
- 2013: ES Uzès Pont du Gard
- 2014–2015: Colomiers
- 2016–2017: Toulon
- 2017–2018: AS Excelsior
- * Club domestic league appearances and goals

Dominique Veilex (born 1 January 1960) is a former professional footballer and current manager. On 24 June 2010, he was named manager of then-amateur club Gazélec Ajaccio. In the ensuing two seasons, Veilex led the club to promotion to the Championnat National in the 2010–11 season and helped the club reach Ligue 2 after finishing third in the 2011–12 edition of the Championat National, thus helping Gazélec attain professional status. He signed a new two-year contract with Gazélec before the 2012–13 season, but only led the club for one Ligue 2 match.

He later managed ES Uzès Pont du Gard, Colomiers, and AS Excelsior.
