= Sylvio Ouassiero =

Malagasy footballer (born 1994)

Personal information
- Full name: Jean Sylvio Ouassiero
- Date of birth: 7 May 1994 (age 32)
- Place of birth: Saint-Benoît, Réunion, France
- Height: 1.75 m (5 ft 9 in)
- Position: Right back

Team information
- Current team: Dudelange
- Number: 27

Youth career
- 2007–2009: Saint-Pierroise
- 2009–2011: Auxerre

Senior career*
Years	Team	Apps	(Gls)
2011–2014	Auxerre II	45	(1)
2014–2017	Standard Liège	0	(0)
2015–2016	→ Geel (loan)	21	(0)
2017–2018	Clémenceau	9	(0)
2018–2019	Lusitanos	22	(0)
2019–2022	Fola Esch	60	(2)
2022–2023	Dudelange	47	(3)

International career^{‡}
2011	France U17	1	(0)
2011–2012	France U18	10	(1)
2012	France U19	1	(0)
2013	France U20	2	(0)
2020–2023	Madagascar	4	(0)
- * Club domestic league appearances and goals as of 1 June 2024 ‡ National team caps and goals as of 16 April 2023

Jean Sylvio Ouassiero (born 7 May 1994) is a professional footballer who plays as a right back for Dudelange. Born in France, he plays for the Madagascar national team.

== International career ==
Ouassiero was born in the French overseas territory Réunion, and is of Malagasy descent. He was a youth international for France. He debuted for the Madagascar national team in a friendly 2-1 loss to Burkina Faso on 11 October 2020.

== Personal life ==
Ouassiero's cousin, Samuel Souprayen, is also a professional footballer.
