= Jonathan Di Maria =

French footballer (born 1983)

Personal information
- Full name: Jonathan Di Maria
- Date of birth: 19 August 1983 (age 43)
- Place of birth: Martigues, France
- Position: Defender

Senior career*
Years	Team	Apps	(Gls)
–2008	FC Martigues		
2008-2009	Chaux-de-Fonds	20	(0)
2009-2012	FC Martigues	64	(0)
2012-2022	Fos-sur-Mer		
- * Club domestic league appearances and goals as of 17:00, 5 November 2022 (UTC)

Jonathan Di Maria (born 19 August 1983) is a French former professional footballer who played as a defender.

== Club career ==
Di Maria started his career with FC Martigues. In July 2008, he went on trial with Scottish side Livingston, but was not offered a permanent deal.

He moved to Swiss side Chaux-de-Fonds in 2008, but returned to Martigues the following season. The Frenchman made 64 league appearances in his second spell with the club.

In 2009, he signed for Fos-sur-Mer. He played for the club for 10 years before retiring.
