= Hassan Rachidi =

Moroccan journalist

- Born: July 6, 1957 (age 68); Meknes, Morocco
- Education: Mohammed V University (Faculty of Law, Rabat)
- Occupation: Journalist
- Employers: Medi 1 Radio (1980–1990); Radio Netherlands (1990–1994); Orbit TV (1994–1996); Al Jazeera (1996–present)
- Known for: Al Jazeera bureau chief prosecuted during the 2008 Sidi Ifni protests press dispute
- Title: Former Al Jazeera Morocco Bureau Chief

Hassan Rachidi is a Moroccan journalist and former Morocco bureau chief for Al Jazeera. In 2008, he was prosecuted and fined by Moroccan authorities for reporting on alleged police violence during protests in Sidi Ifni, after citing a local NGO claim in a broadcast. His case drew criticism from press freedom advocates, who viewed the proceedings as politically motivated. Restricted to desk work, he left Morocco in 2009 for another post with Al Jazeera.

== Career ==
=== Revocation of accreditation ===
In 2006, Al Jazeera began broadcasting its North Africa news program, Al-Hasad al-Magharibi (The Maghreb Bulletin), from Morocco, drawn by the country's relatively greater press freedom. In early 2008, Moroccan authorities suspended the broadcast, citing technical reasons. That June, then-bureau chief Rachidi reported on claims that police had killed demonstrators in Sidi Ifni. His accreditation was revoked and he was charged. In July, a court fined him 50,000 dirhams (nearly $6,000)for "disseminating false information in bad faith" under Article 42 of Morocco’s 2002 Press Law. His defense team walked out of the courtroom after the court refused to grant more time or summon key witnesses, including high-ranking security officials. Rachidi’s lawyer, Khalid Soufiani, stated the verdict had "no legal ground whatsoever" and intended to appeal. The presiding judge, Mohamed El-Alawi, had previously banned another journalist, Ali Lmrabet, from practicing journalism for 10 years in 2005. Journalists and press unions in Morocco and abroad widely condemned the verdict, calling it politically motivated and unjustified.

Restricted to desk work, Rachidi left Morocco in January 2009 for another post with Al Jazeera.
