= Jean-Luc Vannuchi =

French footballer (born 1970)

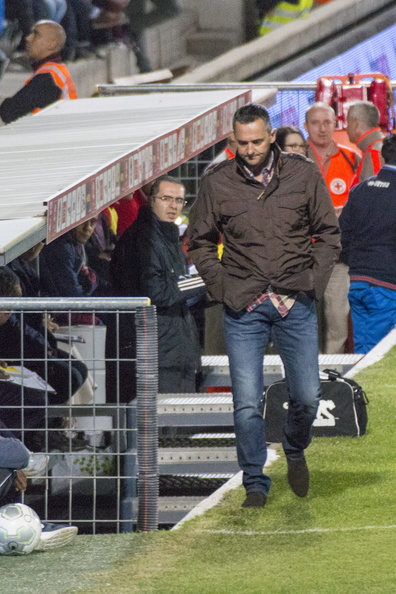
- Vannuchi with Auxerre in 2014

Personal information
- Full name: Jean-Luc Michel Vannuchi
- Date of birth: 13 September 1970 (age 56)
- Place of birth: Marseille, Bouches-du-Rhône, France
- Height: 1.82 m (6 ft 0 in)
- Position: Defender

Senior career*
Years	Team	Apps	(Gls)
1990–1996	Nice	67	(1)
1996–1998	Guingamp	37	(0)
1998–2000	Cannes	55	(0)
2000–2004	Nîmes	67	(0)
Total		226	(1)

Managerial career
- 2005–2007: Nîmes (reserves)
- 2007–2008: Nîmes
- 2009–2011: Paris FC
- 2012–2014: Martigues
- 2014–2016: Auxerre
- 2016–2017: Gazélec Ajaccio
- * Club domestic league appearances and goals

Jean-Luc Michel Vannuchi (born 13 September 1970) is a French football manager and former professional player who played as a defender. He has been a part of the French youth team coaching setup since 2018.

== Early life ==
Jean-Luc Michel Vannuchi was born on 13 September 1970 in Marseille, a city in the Bouches-du-Rhône department.

== Playing career ==
Vannuchi started his career with Nice, where he was part of the team that won Ligue 2 in 1994. He went on to play for Guingamp, Cannes and Nîmes before retiring in 2004.

In the 1997 Coupe de France Final, Vannuchi came on as a substitute for Guingamp but was on the losing side as his former club Nice won the match in a penalty shoot-out.

== Managerial career ==
Following his retirement from playing, Vannuchi took up coaching and was appointed as manager of Nîmes B in 2005. Two years later, he took charge of the Nîmes senior team but left the club in December 2008. Vannuchi was hired as manager of Paris FC in the summer of 2009 and spent two seasons with the Championnat National side. In February 2012, he joined National club Martigues following the departure of Jérôme Erceau. In March 2014, Vannuchi replaced Bernard Casoni as manager of Auxerre. Vannuchi was named as the new manager of Gazélec Ajaccio in June 2016. However, he resigned in May 2017 and was succeeded by Albert Cartier.

Since 2018, Vannuchi has coached the French U-16 U-17, U-18, U-19, and U-20 teams, and is currently the U-19 coach.
