= Stade Léon-Bollée =

Football stadium in Le Mans, France

Coordinates: 48°00′54″N 0°11′35″E

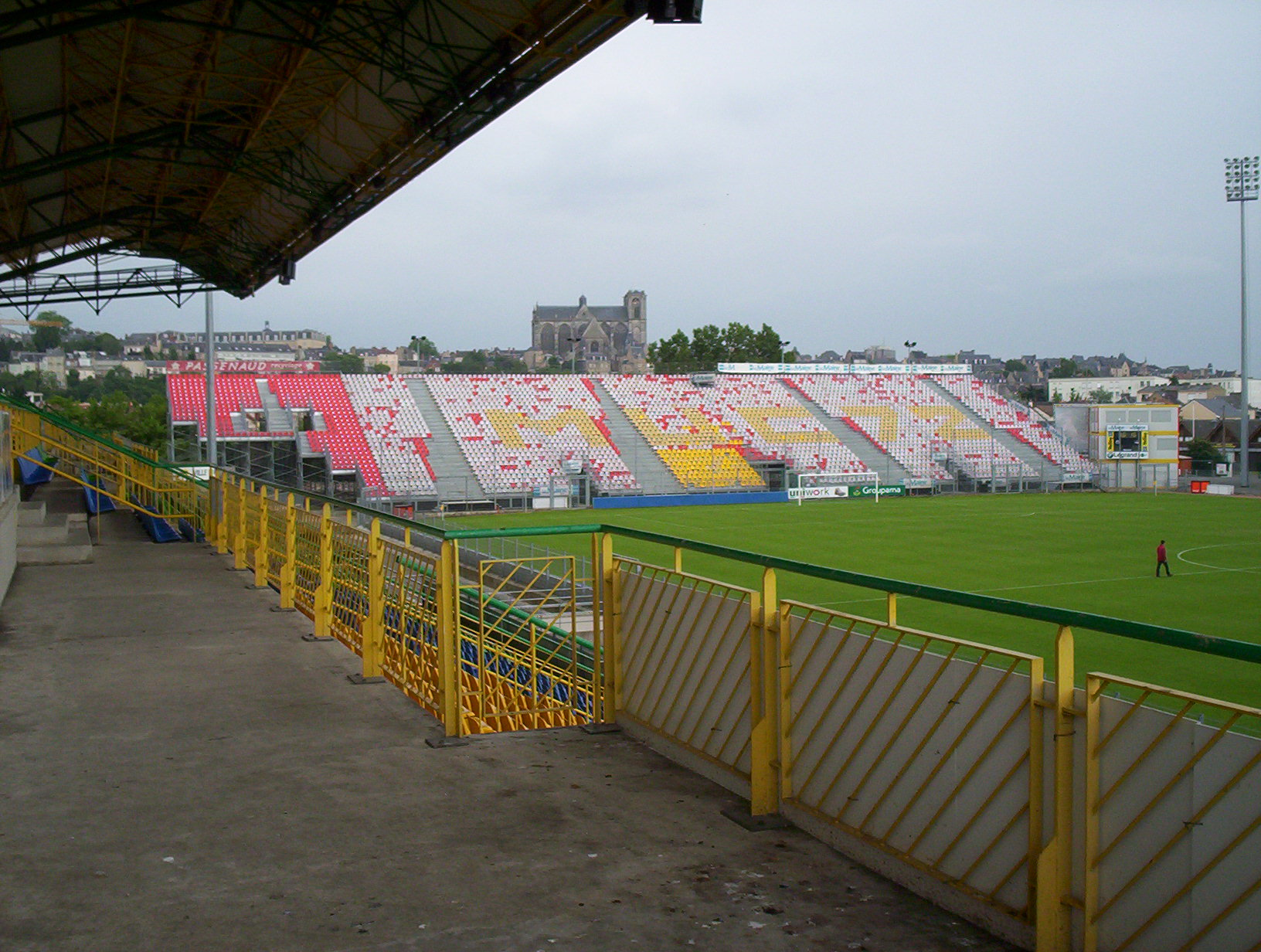
- Interactive map of Stade Léon-Bollée
- Full name: Stade omnisports Léon Bollée
- Location: Rue Claircigny, 72000 , Le Mans, France
- Capacity: 17,801
- Surface: Grass

Construction
- Built: 1904
- Opened: 1906
- Expanded: 2004

Tenant
- Le Mans UC72 (Ligue 1)

Stade Léon-Bollée was a multi-purpose stadium in Le Mans, France. It is used mostly for football matches and was the home stadium of Le Mans UC72 until 2011, when it was replaced by MMArena. The stadium is able to hold 17,801 people and was built in 1906.
