= Jean-François Bedenik =

French footballer and coach (born 1978)

Personal information
- Date of birth: 20 November 1978 (age 47)
- Place of birth: Seclin, France
- Height: 1.80 m (5 ft 11 in)
- Position: Goalkeeper

Team information
- Current team: AS Saint-Étienne (academy coach)

Youth career
- FC Seclin

Senior career*
Years	Team	Apps	(Gls)
1997–1999	Lens B		
1999–2000	Valenciennes B	32	(0)
2000–2004	Le Mans UC 72	72	(0)
2004–2006	Neuchâtel Xamax	60	(0)
2006	Ionikos	13	(0)
2007–2010	US Boulogne	82	(0)
2010–2012	Neuchâtel Xamax	94	(0)
2012–2017	Vannes OC		

Managerial career
- 2017–: AS Saint-Étienne (academy coach)
- * Club domestic league appearances and goals

Jean-François Bedenik (born 20 November 1978) is a French football coach and retired footballer who played as a goalkeeper. He is currently working at the academy of AS Saint-Étienne as a goalkeeper coach.

== Career ==
In 2004, he joined Swiss side Neuchâtel Xamax. In 2006, he moved to Greece, to join Ionikos, where he stayed just one season, before moving to US Boulogne. After three seasons with US Boulogne-sur-Mer the 31-year-old goalkeeper returned to Neuchatel Xamax on a four-year deal.
