= Yohann Rangdet =

French footballer and coach (born 1980)

Personal information
- Date of birth: 3 July 1980 (age 46)
- Place of birth: Sèvres, France
- Height: 1.76 m (5 ft 9 in)
- Position: Striker

Team information
- Current team: Racing Besançon (youth coach)

Senior career*
Years	Team	Apps	(Gls)
2000–2001	Red Star	16	(7)
2001–2003	Le Mans	27	(8)
2003–2005	US Créteil	24	(5)
2004–2005	→ L'Entente SSG (loan)	25	(11)
2005–2006	Angers	17	(2)
2006–2010	Racing Besançon	106	(33)
2010–2011	SR Colmar	23	(4)
2011–2012	US Raon-l'Étape	8	(1)
2012–2013	Racing Besançon		

Managerial career
- 2013–2017: Racing Besançon (youth)
- 2017: Racing Besançon (caretaker)
- 2017–: Racing Besançon (youth)
- * Club domestic league appearances and goals

Yohann Rangdet (born 3 July 1980) is a French football coach and former professional player. He works as a youth coach at Racing Besançon.

He played on the professional level in Ligue 2 for Le Mans Union Club 72 and US Créteil-Lusitanos.
