= Football at the 2012 Summer Olympics – Women's tournament – Knockout stage =

== Qualified teams ==
Group	Winners	Runners-up	Third-placed team
E	Great Britain	Brazil	New Zealand
F	Sweden	Japan	Canada
G	United States	France	—N/a

== Bracket ==
Quarter-finals
E1	Great Britain	0
F3	Canada	2
G1	United States	2
E3	New Zealand	0
F1	Sweden	1
G2	France	2
E2	Brazil	0
F2	Japan	2

Semi-finals
F3	Canada	3
G1	United States (aet)	4
G2	France	1
F2	Japan	2

Gold medal match
G1	United States	2
F2	Japan	1
Bronze medal match
F3	Canada	1
G2	France	0

== Quarter-finals ==
=== Sweden vs France ===
3 August 2012
12:00

Sweden	1–2	France
Fischer 18'	Report; Report	Georges 29'; Renard 39'

Hampden Park, Glasgow
Attendance: 12,869
Referee: Kari Seitz (United States)

Sweden	France

GK	1	Hedvig Lindahl
DF	2	Linda Sembrant
DF	3	Emma Berglund
DF	4	Annica Svensson	(yellow card) 78'	(substituted off) 82'
DF	6	Sara Thunebro
MF	5	Nilla Fischer (c)
MF	7	Lisa Dahlkvist
MF	12	Marie Hammarström		(substituted off) 70'
MF	15	Caroline Seger
FW	8	Lotta Schelin
FW	10	Sofia Jakobsson		(substituted off) 58'
Substitutions:
MF	9	Kosovare Asllani		(substituted on) 58'
MF	11	Antonia Göransson		(substituted on) 70'
FW	16	Madelaine Edlund		(substituted on) 82'
Manager:
Thomas Dennerby

GK	18	Sarah Bouhaddi
DF	2	Wendie Renard
DF	4	Laura Georges
DF	7	Corine Franco	(yellow card) 21'
DF	8	Sonia Bompastor
MF	6	Sandrine Soubeyrand (c)		(substituted off) 70'
MF	14	Louisa Nécib
MF	15	Élise Bussaglia
FW	11	Marie-Laure Delie
FW	12	Élodie Thomis		(substituted off) 75'
FW	17	Gaëtane Thiney		(substituted off) 88'
Substitutions:
MF	10	Camille Abily		(substituted on) 70'
FW	9	Eugénie Le Sommer		(substituted on) 75'
MF	13	Camille Catala		(substituted on) 88'
Manager:
Bruno Bini

Assistant referees:
Veronica Perez (United States)
Marlene Duffy (United States)
Fourth official:
Hong Eun-ah (South Korea)

=== United States vs New Zealand ===
3 August 2012
14:30

United States	2–0	New Zealand
Wambach 27'; Leroux 87'	Report

St James' Park, Newcastle
Attendance: 10,441
Referee: Salomé di Iorio (Argentina)

United States	New Zealand

GK	1	Hope Solo
DF	3	Christie Rampone (c)
DF	5	Kelley O'Hara
DF	6	Amy LePeilbet
DF	16	Rachel Buehler
MF	10	Carli Lloyd	(yellow card) 79'
MF	15	Megan Rapinoe		(substituted off) 71'
MF	17	Tobin Heath
FW	12	Lauren Cheney		(substituted off) 90+1'
FW	13	Alex Morgan		(substituted off) 81'
FW	14	Abby Wambach	(yellow card) 43'
Substitutions:
MF	9	Heather O'Reilly		(substituted on) 71'
FW	11	Sydney Leroux		(substituted on) 81'
FW	8	Amy Rodriguez		(substituted on) 90+1'
Manager:
(Sweden) Pia Sundhage

GK	1	Jenny Bindon
DF	2	Ria Percival
DF	4	Katie Hoyle	(substituted off) 90+5'
DF	5	Abby Erceg
DF	6	Rebecca Smith (c)
DF	7	Ali Riley
MF	11	Kirsty Yallop	(substituted off) 57'
MF	12	Betsy Hassett
FW	9	Amber Hearn
FW	10	Sarah Gregorius
FW	17	Hannah Wilkinson	(substituted off) 77'
Substitutions:
MF	8	Hayley Moorwood	(substituted on) 57'
FW	13	Rosie White	(substituted on) 77'
MF	16	Annalie Longo	(substituted on) 90+5'
Manager:
(United Kingdom) Tony Readings

Assistant referees:
Mariana Corbo (Uruguay)
Maria Rocco (Argentina)
Fourth official:
Thérèse Neguel (Cameroon)

=== Brazil vs Japan ===
3 August 2012
17:00

Brazil	0–2	Japan
	Report	Ōgimi 27'; Ohno 73'

Millennium Stadium, Cardiff
Attendance: 28,528
Referee: Kirsi Heikkinen (Finland)

Brazil	Japan

GK	1	Andréia
DF	5	Érika
DF	16	Renata Costa		(substituted off) 85'
MF	8	Formiga
MF	12	Rosana		(substituted off) 80'
MF	13	Francielle
MF	14	Bruna	(yellow card) 70'
FW	2	Fabiana
FW	9	Thaís Guedes
FW	10	Marta (c)	(yellow card) 49'
FW	11	Cristiane
Substitutions:
MF	7	Ester		(substituted on) 80'
FW	17	Grazielle		(substituted on) 85'
Manager:
Jorge Barcellos

GK	1	Miho Fukumoto
RB	2	Yukari Kinga
CB	3	Azusa Iwashimizu
CB	4	Saki Kumagai
LB	5	Aya Sameshima
RM	8	Aya Miyama (c)
CM	10	Homare Sawa
CM	6	Mizuho Sakaguchi	(yellow card) 58'
LM	9	Nahomi Kawasumi
CF	17	Yūki Ōgimi		(substituted off) 89'
CF	11	Shinobu Ohno		(substituted off) 85'
Substitutions:
FW	7	Kozue Ando		(substituted on) 85'
FW	15	Megumi Takase		(substituted on) 89'
Manager:
Norio Sasaki

Assistant referees:
Anu Jokela (Finland)
Tonja Paavola (Finland)
Fourth official:
Christina Pedersen (Norway)

=== Great Britain vs Canada ===
3 August 2012
19:30

Great Britain	0–2	Canada
	Report	Filigno 12'; Sinclair 26'

City of Coventry Stadium, Coventry
Attendance: 28,828
Referee: Sachiko Yamagishi (Japan)

Great Britain	Canada

GK	1	Karen Bardsley
DF	2	Alex Scott
DF	3	Steph Houghton
DF	5	Sophie Bradley	(substituted off) 84'
DF	6	Casey Stoney (c)
MF	4	Jill Scott
MF	12	Kim Little	(substituted off) 82'
MF	14	Anita Asante
FW	7	Karen Carney
FW	9	Ellen White	(substituted off) 63'
FW	15	Eniola Aluko
Substitutions:
MF	8	Fara Williams	(substituted on) 63'
FW	17	Rachel Williams	(substituted on) 82'
FW	11	Rachel Yankey	(substituted on) 84'
Manager:
Hope Powell

GK	18	Erin McLeod
DF	4	Carmelina Moscato
DF	7	Rhian Wilkinson
DF	10	Lauren Sesselmann
DF	20	Marie-Ève Nault	(yellow card) 86'
MF	8	Diana Matheson
MF	11	Desiree Scott
MF	13	Sophie Schmidt		(substituted off) 78'
FW	12	Christine Sinclair (c)		(substituted off) 88'
FW	14	Melissa Tancredi
FW	16	Jonelle Filigno		(substituted off) 61'
Substitutions:
MF	6	Kaylyn Kyle		(substituted on) 61'
MF	15	Kelly Parker		(substituted on) 78'
MF	17	Brittany Timko		(substituted on) 88'
Manager:
(United Kingdom) John Herdman

Assistant referees:
Saori Takahashi (Japan)
Widiya Shamsuri (Japan)
Fourth official:
Bibiana Steinhaus (Germany)

== Semi-finals ==
=== France vs Japan ===
6 August 2012
17:00

France	1–2	Japan
Le Sommer 76'	Report	Ōgimi 32'; Sakaguchi 49'

Wembley Stadium, London
Attendance: 61,482
Referee: Quetzalli Alvarado (Mexico)

France	Japan

GK	18	Sarah Bouhaddi
DF	2	Wendie Renard	(yellow card) 13'
DF	4	Laura Georges
DF	7	Corine Franco
DF	8	Sonia Bompastor
MF	6	Sandrine Soubeyrand (c)		(substituted off) 56'
MF	14	Louisa Nécib
MF	15	Élise Bussaglia
FW	11	Marie-Laure Delie
FW	12	Élodie Thomis
FW	17	Gaëtane Thiney		(substituted off) 58'
Substitutions:
MF	10	Camille Abily		(substituted on) 56'
FW	9	Eugénie Le Sommer		(substituted on) 58'
Manager:
Bruno Bini

GK	1	Miho Fukumoto
RB	2	Yukari Kinga
CB	3	Azusa Iwashimizu
CB	4	Saki Kumagai
LB	5	Aya Sameshima
RM	8	Aya Miyama (c)
CM	10	Homare Sawa
CM	6	Mizuho Sakaguchi	(substituted off) 84'
LM	9	Nahomi Kawasumi
CF	17	Yūki Ōgimi
CF	11	Shinobu Ohno	(substituted off) 74'
Substitutions:
FW	7	Kozue Ando	(substituted on) 74'
MF	14	Asuna Tanaka	(substituted on) 84'
Manager:
Norio Sasaki

Assistant referees:
Mayte Chávez (Mexico)
Shirley Perello (Honduras)
Fourth official:
Salomé di Iorio (Argentina)

=== Canada vs United States ===
6 August 2012
19:45

Canada	3–4 (a.e.t.)	United States
Sinclair 22', 67', 73'	Report	Rapinoe 54', 70'; Wambach 80' (pen.); Morgan 120+3'

Old Trafford, Manchester
Attendance: 26,630
Referee: Christina Pedersen (Norway)

Canada	United States

GK	18	Erin McLeod
RB	7	Rhian Wilkinson
CB	4	Carmelina Moscato
CB	10	Lauren Sesselmann
LB	20	Marie-Ève Nault		(substituted off) 101'
DM	11	Desiree Scott	(yellow card) 60'
CM	8	Diana Matheson
CM	13	Sophie Schmidt
RW	16	Jonelle Filigno		(substituted off) 67'
LW	14	Melissa Tancredi	(yellow card) 79'
CF	12	Christine Sinclair (c)
Substitutions:
MF	6	Kaylyn Kyle		(substituted on) 67'
DF	3	Chelsea Stewart		(substituted on) 101'
Manager:
(United Kingdom) John Herdman

GK	1	Hope Solo
RB	5	Kelley O'Hara
CB	3	Christie Rampone (c)
CB	16	Rachel Buehler	(substituted off) 110'
LB	6	Amy LePeilbet	(substituted off) 76'
RM	17	Tobin Heath
CM	10	Carli Lloyd
CM	12	Lauren Cheney	(substituted off) 101'
LM	15	Megan Rapinoe
CF	14	Abby Wambach
CF	13	Alex Morgan
Substitutions:
FW	11	Sydney Leroux	(substituted on) 76'
MF	9	Heather O'Reilly	(substituted on) 101'
DF	4	Becky Sauerbrunn	(substituted on) 110'
Manager:
(Sweden) Pia Sundhage

Assistant referees:
Hege Steinlund (Norway)
Lada Rojc (Croatia)
Fourth official:
Hong Eun-ah (South Korea)

== Bronze medal match ==
=== Canada vs France ===
9 August 2012
13:00

(bronze) Canada	1–0	France
Matheson 90+2'	Report

City of Coventry Stadium, Coventry
Attendance: 12,465
Referee: Jenny Palmqvist (Sweden)

Canada	France

GK	18	Erin McLeod
DF	4	Carmelina Moscato
DF	7	Rhian Wilkinson
DF	10	Lauren Sesselmann
DF	20	Marie-Ève Nault	(substituted off) 83'
MF	8	Diana Matheson
MF	11	Desiree Scott
MF	13	Sophie Schmidt
FW	12	Christine Sinclair (c)
FW	14	Melissa Tancredi	(substituted off) 77'
FW	16	Jonelle Filigno	(substituted off) 55'
Substitutions:
MF	6	Kaylyn Kyle	(substituted on) 55'
MF	17	Brittany Timko	(substituted on) 77'
DF	9	Candace Chapman	(substituted on) 83'
Manager:
(United Kingdom) John Herdman

GK	18	Sarah Bouhaddi
DF	2	Wendie Renard
DF	4	Laura Georges
DF	7	Corine Franco
DF	8	Sonia Bompastor
MF	6	Sandrine Soubeyrand (c)		(substituted off) 54'
MF	14	Louisa Nécib
MF	15	Élise Bussaglia
FW	11	Marie-Laure Delie		(substituted off) 60'
FW	12	Élodie Thomis		(substituted off) 90+2'
FW	17	Gaëtane Thiney
Substitutions:
MF	10	Camille Abily	(yellow card) 90'	(substituted on) 54'
FW	9	Eugénie Le Sommer		(substituted on) 60'
MF	13	Camille Catala		(substituted on) 90+2'
Manager:
Bruno Bini

Assistant referees:
Helen Karo (Sweden)
Anna Nyström (Sweden)
Fourth official:
Quetzalli Alvarado (Mexico)

== Gold medal match ==
=== United States vs Japan ===
9 August 2012
19:45

(gold) United States	2–1	Japan (silver)
Lloyd 8', 54'	Report	Ōgimi 63'

Wembley Stadium, London
Attendance: 80,203
Referee: Bibiana Steinhaus (Germany)

United States	Japan

GK	1	Hope Solo
DF	3	Christie Rampone (c)
DF	5	Kelley O'Hara
DF	6	Amy LePeilbet
DF	16	Rachel Buehler		(substituted off) 80'
MF	7	Shannon Boxx
MF	10	Carli Lloyd
MF	15	Megan Rapinoe		(substituted off) 57'
MF	17	Tobin Heath
FW	13	Alex Morgan
FW	14	Abby Wambach	(yellow card) 90'
Substitutions:
FW	12	Lauren Cheney		(substituted on) 57'
DF	4	Becky Sauerbrunn		(substituted on) 80'
Manager:
(Sweden) Pia Sundhage

GK	1	Miho Fukumoto
RB	2	Yukari Kinga
CB	3	Azusa Iwashimizu
CB	4	Saki Kumagai
LB	5	Aya Sameshima	(substituted off) 77'
RM	8	Aya Miyama (c)
CM	10	Homare Sawa
CM	6	Mizuho Sakaguchi	(substituted off) 59'
LM	9	Nahomi Kawasumi
CF	17	Yūki Ōgimi
CF	11	Shinobu Ohno	(substituted off) 86'
Substitutions:
MF	14	Asuna Tanaka	(substituted on) 59'
FW	16	Mana Iwabuchi	(substituted on) 77'
FW	13	Karina Maruyama	(substituted on) 86'
Manager:
Norio Sasaki

Assistant referees:
Marina Wozniak (Germany)
Katrin Rafalski (Germany)
Fourth official:
Salomé di Iorio (Argentina)
