= Mohamed Chemlal =

French footballer (born 1995)

Personal information
- Date of birth: 8 February 1995 (age 31)
- Place of birth: Mantes-la-Jolie, France
- Height: 1.70 m (5 ft 7 in)
- Position: Midfielder

Team information
- Current team: Union de Touarga
- Number: 10

Youth career
- 2003–2010: Mantes
- 2010–2012: Caen

Senior career*
Years	Team	Apps	(Gls)
2012	Caen B	2	(0)
2012–2014	Boulogne	48	(1)
2012–2013	→ Boulogne B (loan)	5	(0)
2015–2016	Le Havre B	20	(4)
2016–2017	Forest Green Rovers	6	(1)
2017	→ Weston-super-Mare (loan)	7	(0)
2018	Vereya	4	(0)
2018–2019	Mantes	26	(6)
2019–2020	Red Star	7	(1)
2020–2022	Mantes	5	(0)
2022–	Union de Touarga	89	(9)

International career
2012	France U17	3	(1)
- * Club domestic league appearances and goals as of 30 September 2024

Mohamed Chemlal (born 8 February 1995) is a French professional footballer who plays as a midfielder for Union de Touarga.

== Career ==
In 2012, Chemlal signed for Boulogne in the French third division from the reserves of French Ligue 1 side Caen.

In 2016, he signed for Forest Green Rovers in the English fifth division from French fifth division club Le Havre B, where the captain did not like him due to them playing the same position.

Before the second half of the 2017–18 season, Chemlal signed for Vereya in the Bulgarian top flight after playing for English sixth division team Weston-super-Mare, before returning to France due to the death of his father.

In 2018, he signed for Mantes in the French fourth division.
