= Anthony Colinet =

French footballer (born 1976)

Personal information
- Full name: Anthony Colinet
- Date of birth: January 15, 1976 (age 50)
- Place of birth: Fécamp, France
- Height: 1.76 m (5 ft 9 1/2 in)
- Position: Midfielder

Youth career
- 1988–1993: Fécamp

Senior career*
Years	Team	Apps	(Gls)
1993–1995	Fécamp	3	(1)
1995–1997	Lens	3	(0)
1997–1998	US Fécamp	0	(0)
1998–2000	Fréjus	30	(7)
2000–2002	Gazélec Ajaccio	8	(2)
2002–2003	AS Beauvais	25	(0)
2003–2006	Gazélec Ajaccio	73	(10)
2006–2007	Toulon	28	(3)
2007	CA Bastia	0	(0)
2007–2014	Gazélec Ajaccio	191	(5)
Total		361	(28)
- * Club domestic league appearances and goals as of 2 March 2016

Anthony Colinet (born January 15, 1976) is a retired French professional footballer who played midfielder. He played on the professional level in Ligue 1 for RC Lens and Ligue 2 for AS Beauvais Oise.

At the end of his career Colinet was playing for amateurs Gazélec Ajaccio.
