= Ibrahim Rachidi =

Footballer (born 1980)

Personal information
- Date of birth: 13 January 1980 (age 46)
- Place of birth: Marseille, France
- Height: 1.88 m (6 ft 2 in)
- Position: Defender

Senior career*
Years	Team	Apps	(Gls)
1998–1999	Istres	0	(0)
1999–2000	Bourges		
2000	Fos-sur-Mer		
2000–2001	Caen B	5	(0)
2001–2002	Karlsruher SC II	0	(0)
2002–2004	L'Île-Rousse	39	(1)
2005–2009	Cassis Carnoux	96	(1)
2009–2010	Marignane	0	(0)
2010–2013	Gazélec Ajaccio	80	(3)
2013–2014	Uzès	17	(0)
2014	Toulon	0	(0)
2015	Marignane	2	(0)
2015–2016	Consolat Marseille	21	(0)
2016–2018	Marseille B	13	(0)

International career
2011–2017	Comoros	18	(0)
- * Club domestic league appearances and goals

Ibrahim Rachidi (born 13 January 1980) is a former professional footballer who played as a defender. Born in France, he won 18 caps for the Comoros national team.
