= Emmanuel Da Costa =

French footballer and manager (born 1977)

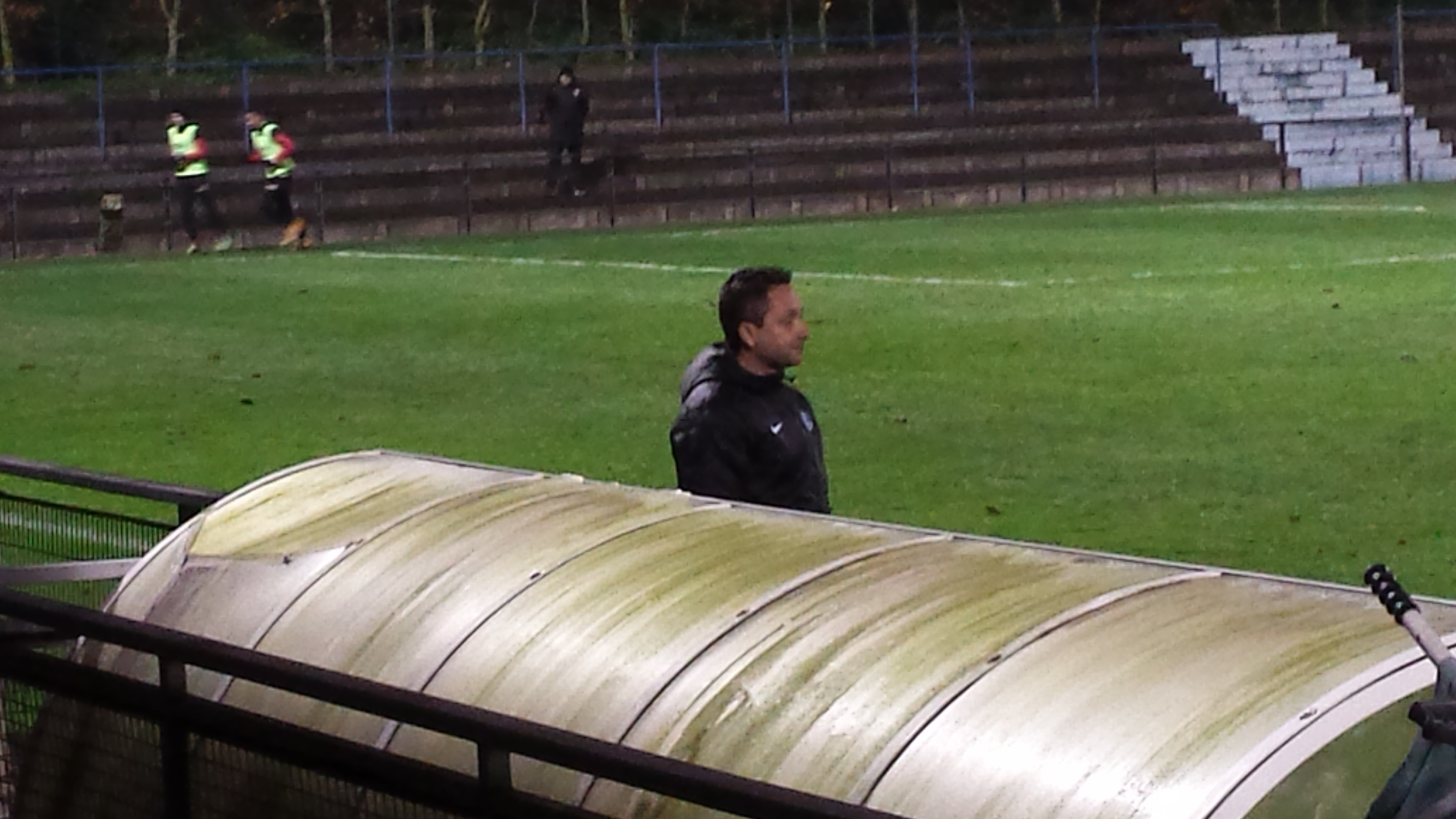
- Da Costa as Quevilly manager in 2014

Personal information
- Date of birth: 3 September 1977 (age 49)
- Place of birth: Rouen, France
- Height: 1.68 m (5 ft 6 in)
- Position: Midfielder

Team information
- Current team: Hesperange (manager)

Youth career
- St Etienne-du-Rouvray
- 1993–1994: Marseille
- 1994–1998: Cannes

Senior career*
Years	Team	Apps	(Gls)
1998–1999	Viry-Châtillon		
1999–2000	Dieppe		
2000–2001	Rouen		
2001–2002	Rouen B		
2002–2004	Oissel		

Managerial career
- 2004–2009: Rouen (youth)
- 2009–2011: Rouen B (assistant)
- 2009–2012: Rouen (assistant)
- 2012: Rouen
- 2013: Compiègne
- 2013–2020: Quevilly
- 2020: SC Lyon
- 2021–2022: Créteil
- 2022–2024: Saint-Étienne (assistant)
- 2024–: Hesperange
- * Club domestic league appearances and goals

Emmanuel Da Costa (born 3 September 1977) is a French professional football manager and former player who played as a midfielder. He currently works as manager at the club Hesperange.

== Managerial career ==
Da Costa played football at an amateur level in the French lower division. An intelligent midfielder, his career was plagued by injuries. Da Costa began coaching at Rouen, and eventually became a professional coach when he promoted Quevilly-Rouen to Ligue 2 in 2017.

Da Costa left Quevilly-Rouen in May 2020. A few days later, he was announced as manager of SC Lyon. He was sacked from the job on 18 December 2020, after just one win in 16 games. On 15 March 2021, he was announced as manager of Créteil.

On 9 June 2022, it was announced that Da Costa had joined Ligue 2 side Saint-Étienne as assistant manager to Laurent Batlles.

In June 2024, Da Costa became new manager of Hesperange in Luxembourg.

== Personal life ==
Born in France, Da Costa is of Portuguese descent.
