= Franck Priou =

French footballer (born 1963)

Personal information
- Date of birth: 17 October 1963 (age 63)
- Place of birth: Marignane, Bouches-du-Rhône, France
- Height: 1.81 m (5 ft 11 in)
- Position: Striker

Team information
- Current team: Endoume (Manager)

Youth career
- Auxerre

Senior career*
Years	Team	Apps	(Gls)
1984–1986	Istres	59	(36)
1986–1988	Lyon	53	(15)
1988–1990	Mulhouse	62	(31)
1990–1991	Sochaux	20	(3)
1991–1995	Cannes	89	(46)
1995	→ Saint-Etienne (loan)	10	(3)
1995–1996	Caen	37	(23)
1996–1997	Martigues	31	(12)
1997–2000	Istres	50	(20)

Managerial career
- –: Istres B
- 2007–2008: Consolat Marseille
- 2008–2010: Gap
- 2010–2011: Martigues
- 2011: Fréjus Saint-Raphaël
- 2014: Marignane
- 2014–2016: Martigues
- 2016: Mulhouse
- 2018–2019: Istres
- 2019–: Endoume
- * Club domestic league appearances and goals

Franck Priou (born 17 October 1963 ) is a French former professional football player and current manager of US Marseille Endoume.

== Playing career ==
Priou, who played as a striker, played mainly in Ligue 1 and Ligue 2 for Istres, Lyon, Mulhouse, Sochaux, Cannes, Saint-Etienne, Caen and Martigues.

He was the leading goalscorer in Ligue 2 in 1993.

== Coaching career ==
After retiring as a player, Priou was manager of Istres B team, Consolat Marseille and Gap, leading the team to the Championnat National in 2010. In 2010, he was appointed manager of Martigues. The following year he joined Fréjus, but left the club after six months in charge. He coached Mulhouse in 2016. In July 2018 he was appointed as manager of Istres. He left the role at the end of the 2018–19 season.

In December 2019, he was appointed manager of US Marseille Endoume.
