= Oswald Tanchot =

French football manager (born 1973)

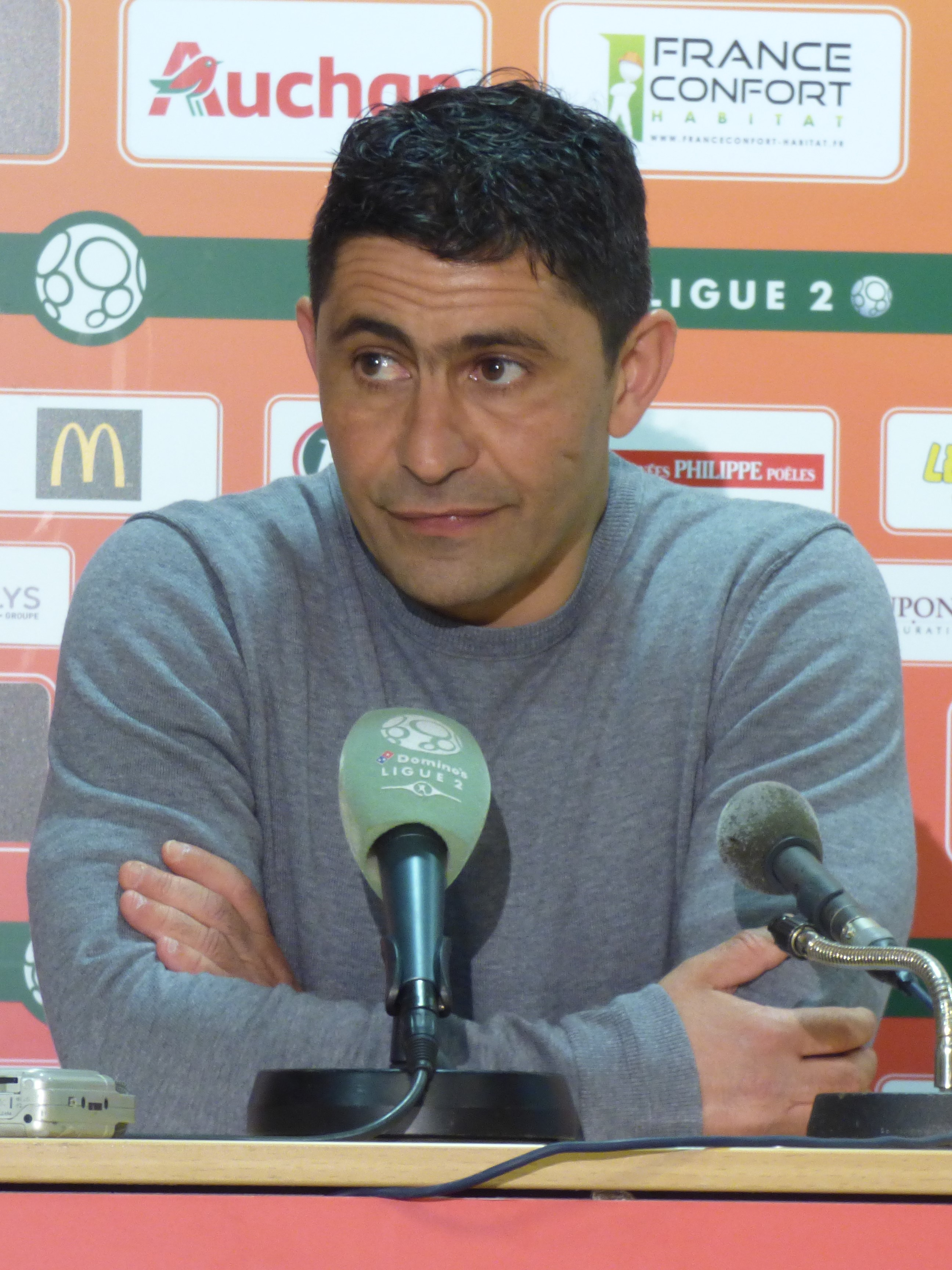
- Tanchot in 2019

Personal information
- Date of birth: 7 August 1973 (age 53)
- Place of birth: Mayenne, France
- Height: 1.65 m (5 ft 5 in)
- Position: Forward

Team information
- Current team: Nancy (manager)

Senior career*
Years	Team	Apps	(Gls)
1990–1994	Laval B	61	(1)
1993–1994	→ Saint-Leu (loan)	18	(1)
1994–1995	Laval	12	(0)
1995–1996	Fécamp	31	(4)
1996–1997	Vitré	30	(3)
1997–1999	Avranches	54	(5)
1999–2003	Vitré		
2003–2004	Perpignan Canet		
2004–2005	La Vitréenne		
Total		206	(14)

Managerial career
- 2005–2011: La Vitréenne
- 2011–2015: Le Poiré-sur-Vie
- 2016–2019: Le Havre
- 2020–2021: Amiens
- 2022: Volos
- 2023–2024: Sochaux
- 2024: Grenoble
- 2026–: Nancy
- * Club domestic league appearances and goals

Oswald Tanchot (born 7 August 1973) is a French professional football manager and former player who is the manager of Ligue 2 club Nancy.

== Playing career ==
Tanchot started his career with Laval, and played 12 Ligue 2 matches for the club in the 1994–95 season. He went on to play in the French lower leagues for five different clubs in a ten-year period.

== Managerial career ==
In 2005, Tanchot was appointed manager of Division d'Honneur side La Vitréenne and led the team to promotion in his first season. He remained with La Vitréenne until July 2011 when he was hired as the new manager of Le Poiré-sur-Vie, replacing Alain Ferrand.

In 2016, he was named assistant manager of Ligue 2 club Le Havre AC. Following Bob Bradley's departure to Swansea City Tanchot was named new manager of Le Havre. He left the post at the end of the 2018–19 season. Incredibly, after just one game in charge of Volos NPS in August 2022 he was sacked. Tanchot managed Volos to a 3–3 draw against Asteras Tripolis.

On 28 May 2024, Tanchot signed a two-year contract to manage Grenoble.

On 21 May 2026, Tanchot was hired by Ligue 2 club Nancy with a two-year contract.

== Managerial statistics ==
As of 20 October 2023

Managerial record by team and tenure
Team	Nat	From	To	Record				
Team	Nat	From	To	G	W	D	L	Win %
La Vitréenne	(France)	1 July 2005	1 July 2011	197	81	79	37	41.12
Le Poiré-sur-Vie	(France)	1 July 2011	17 August 2015	161	63	40	58	39.13
Le Havre	(France)	4 October 2016	28 May 2019	121	51	36	34	42.15
Amiens	(France)	29 September 2020	16 June 2021	35	11	12	12	31.43
Volos	(Greece)	1 July 2022	20 August 2022	1	0	1	0	0.00
Sochaux	(France)	1 July 2023	Present	10	3	3	4	30.00
Career totals				525	209	171	145	39.81
