= Stade Francis-Turcan =

Stadium in Martigues, France

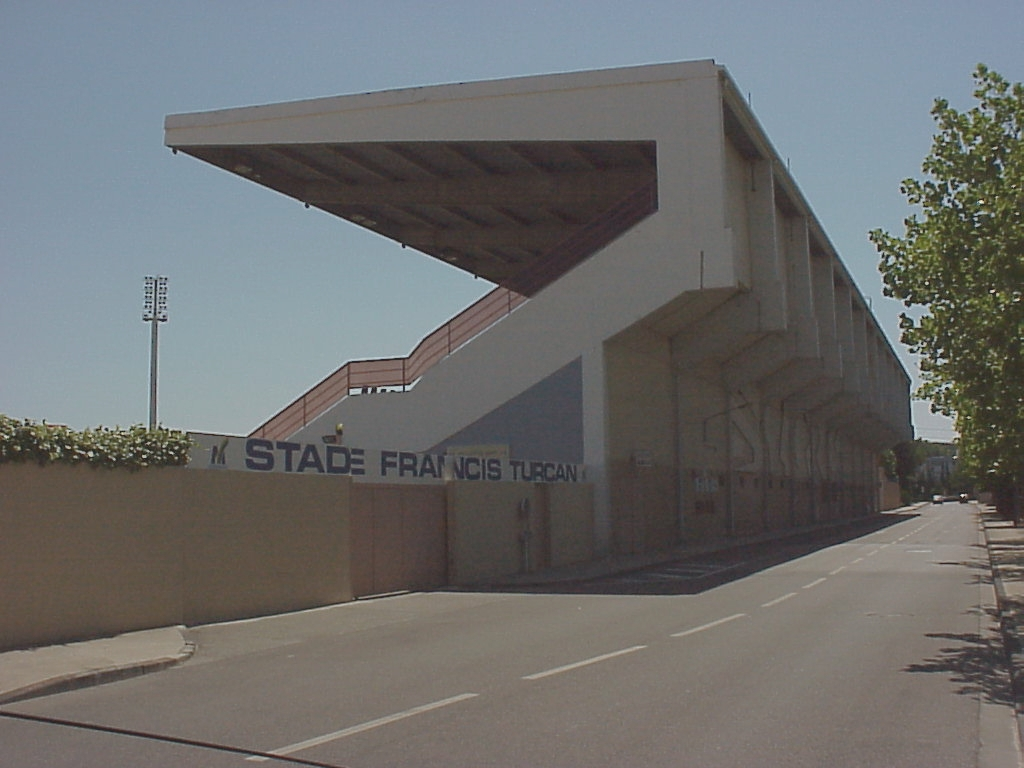
- Interactive map of Stade Francis-Turcan
- Location: Martigues, France
- Coordinates: 43°24′26″N 5°02′58″E
- Owner: City of Martigues
- Capacity: 11,500 (8,289 seated)
- Surface: grass
- Record attendance: 11,000 (R.S.C. Anderlecht vs Olympique de Marseille, 21 July 2007)

Construction
- Opened: 1965
- Renovated: 1993

Tenant
- FC Martigues (1965–present)

Stade Francis-Turcan is a multi-use stadium in Martigues, France. It is currently used mostly for football matches and is the home stadium of FC Martigues. The stadium is able to hold 11,500, of which 8,289 are seated.
