= Vincent Doukantié =

Footballer (born 1977)

Personal information
- Date of birth: 1 April 1977 (age 49)
- Place of birth: Clichy-la-Garenne, France
- Height: 1.80 m (5 ft 11 in)
- Position: Defensive midfielder

Senior career*
Years	Team	Apps	(Gls)
	Aubervilliers	6	(0)
1997–1998	Red Star II		
1998–2000	Red Star	1	(0)
2000–2003	Strasbourg	25	(0)
2002–2003	→ Créteil (loan)	20	(0)
2000–2004	Strasbourg II	30	(2)
2004	Reims	13	(0)
2005–2007	Tours	56	(7)
2007–2008	Laval	38	(3)
2008–2010	Aubervilliers		
2010–2011	Red Star	28	(1)

International career
2001–2007	Mali	18	(2)

Managerial career
- 2011–2013: Red Star
- 2014–2015: Red Star B
- 2017–2019: Red Star (assistant manager)
- 2019: Red Star
- * Club domestic league appearances and goals

Vincent Doukantié (born 1 April 1977) is a former professional footballer who played as a defensive midfielder. Born in France, he represented Mali at international level.
