= FC Martigues =

Football club based in Martigues, France

Martigues
- Full name: Football Club de Martigues
- Nicknames: Les Sang et Or (The Blood and Gold)
- Founded: 1921; 105 years ago
- Ground: Stade Francis-Turcan
- Capacity: 11,500 (8,289 seated)
- Owner(s): Lepa Galeb-Roskopp, Nisa Saveljic, Rob Roskopp (EU Futbol LLC)
- Chairman: Pierre Wantiez
- League: Départemental 3
- 2024–25: Ligue 2, 17th of 18 (administratively relegated)
- Website: www.fcmartigues.com
Home colours	Away colours

Football Club de Martigues, known as FC Martigues or just Martigues, is a French professional football club based in Martigues, Bouches-du-Rhône. As of the 2025–26 season, it competes in the Départemental 3, the eleventh tier of French football.

The club plays at the Stade Francis-Turcan, which has a capacity of 11,500, in Martigues. Their principal rivals are Istres.

== History ==
The club was founded in 1921 and played regional football until the early 1970s when they gained promotion to the professional Division 2.

The club's greatest achievement was winning promotion to the First Division in 1993. The club played for three seasons in the top flight, until it was relegated down to Ligue 2 in 1996. A failed attempt to win promotion at once was followed by relegation to the Championnat National (third level) in 1998. Two years later the club won promotion back to Second Division, but only remained at that level for two seasons.

In 2002, the club was relegated again and after another near miss at promotion in 2003, financial problems saw the club go into liquidation and reform in the Championnat de France Amateur. They finished the 2006–07 season in the Championnat National as 14th. They were relegated to CFA in 2007–08 season as 19th in the Championnat National.

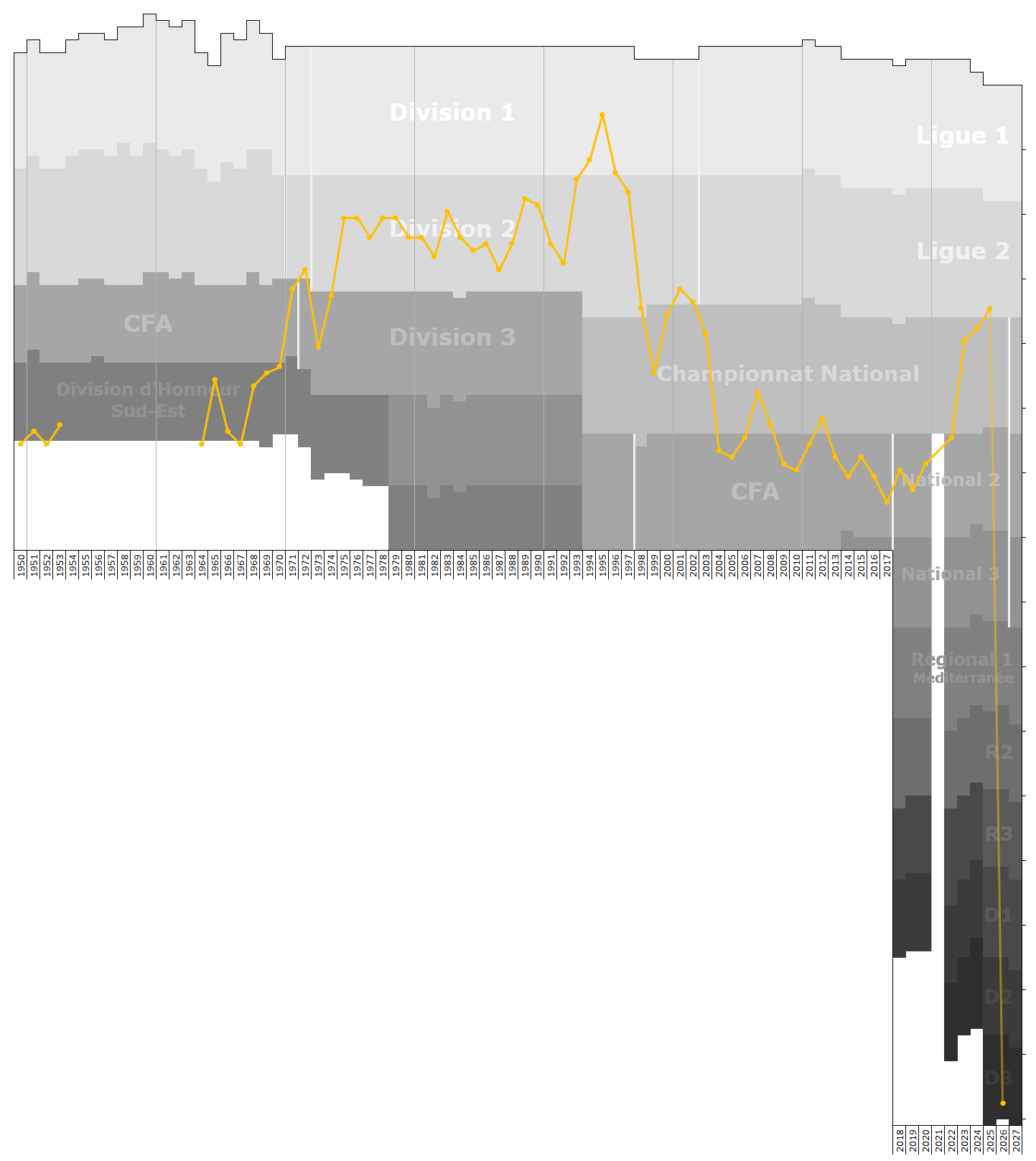
Historical league performance chart of Martigues FC

The club was promoted back to the Championnat National in 2022, after ten years in lower divisions.

On 18 May 2024, Martigues secured promotion to Ligue 2, ending a 22-year absence from the second tier. They defeated Nîmes 1–0 on the final matchday of the 2023–24 Championnat National season to earn promotion as runners-up to Red Star. While waiting for the Stade Francis-Turcan to be renovated to Ligue 2 standards, Martigues began the season at Marseille's Stade Vélodrome.

On 10 May 2025, Martigues was relegated back to the Championnat National after a 5–1 defeat away to Lorient, staying only one season in the second division. On 4 July 2025, the DNCG excluded Martigues from national competitions, signifying relegation to the sixth-tier Régional 1 The club's appeal was rejected on 15 July. Eventually, the club was administratively relegated to the Départemental 3 for the 2025–26 season, the eleventh tier of the French football system.

== Managers ==
- Georges Kramer: 1945–1946
- René Dambrine: 1947–1948
- Robert Costamagna: 1948–1951
- Fernand Voisembert: 1951–1953
- Alberto Molina: 1953–1955
- René Défossé: 1955–1957
- Roger Huart: 1957–1962
- Emile Daniel: 1962–1965
- Valentin Navarro: 1965–1966
- Francis Péri: 1966–1967
- Jacques Sucré: 1967–1980
- Yves Herbet: 1980–1982
- Henri Noël: 1982 – December 1984
- Michel Legros: December 1984 – 1985
- Yves Herbet: 1985 – January 1988
- Paul Orsatti: January 1988 – 1992
- Christian Sarramagna: 1992–1994
- René Exbrayat: 1994 – March 1996
- Patrick Parizon: March 1996 – September 1998
- Yves Herbet and Mahmoud Guendouz: September 1998 – 1999
- Christian Dalger: 1999 – October 1999
- Mahmoud Guendouz: October 1999 – December 2000
- Christian Caminiti: December 2000 – October 2001
- Guy David: October – December 2001
- Baptiste Gentili: December 2001 – 2002
- Michel Estevan: 2002 – January 2003
- Roland Gransart: January 2003 – 2003
- Franck N'Dioro: 2003 – February 2004
- Michel Estevan: February – November 2004
- Patrice Eyraud: November 2004 – 2008
- Claude Calabuig: 2008–2010
- Franck Priou: 2010–2011
- Jérôme Erceau: 2011–2012
- Jean-Luc Vannuchi: 2012–2014
- Franck Priou: 2014–2016
- Franck N'Dioro: 2016–2017
- Farid Fouzari: 2017
- Éric Chelle: 2017–2021
- Grégory Poirier: 2021–2024
- Thierry Laurey: 2024
- Ibrahim Rachidi (carataker): 2024–2025
- Hakim Malek : 2025
- Salim Mramboini: 2025

== Honours ==
- Championnat National
  - Runner-up (1): 2023–24
- Championnat National 2
  - Champions (1): 2021–22

== Notable former players ==
- (Algeria) Ali Benarbia
- (Algeria) Djamel Belmadi
- (Gabon) Daniel Cousin
- (Poland) Tomasz Frankowski
- (Turkey) Kasim Yildiz
- (Slovakia) Lubomir Luhovy
- (France) Eric Cantona
- (France) Rod Fanni
- (France) Nicolas Perez
- (France) Andre-Pierre Gignac
- (France) Rudi Garcia
- (France) Jean-Marc Ferreri
- (France) Eric Di Meco
