= Jérôme Erceau =

French footballer and coach (born 1973)

Personal information
- Date of birth: 14 January 1973 (age 53)
- Place of birth: La Roche-sur-Yon, France
- Height: 1.82 m (5 ft 11 1/2 in)
- Position: Defender

Senior career*
Years	Team	Apps	(Gls)
1991–1994	La Roche VF	73	(1)
1994–1997	USL Dunkerque	94	(2)
1997–1999	Amiens	75	(2)
1999–2002	Le Mans	50	(3)
2002–2003	ES Wasquehal	33	(0)
2003–2004	CS Louhans-Cuiseaux		
2004–2010	FC Martigues		

Managerial career
- 2011–2012: FC Martigues
- * Club domestic league appearances and goals as of 14 February 2014

Jérôme Erceau (born 14 January 1973 in La Roche-sur-Yon) is a French former professional football player and current coach. Between June 2011 and February 2012, he managed FC Martigues in the Championnat National.

He played professionally in Ligue 2 for La Roche VF, USL Dunkerque, Amiens SC, Le Mans Union Club 72, ES Wasquehal, CS Louhans-Cuiseaux and FC Martigues.

In June 2011, Erceau was named as head coach of FC Martigues, where he spent six years of his playing career.
