= 2015–16 Chamois Niortais F.C. season =

Chamois Niortais
2015–16 season
- Chairman: Joël Coué
- Manager: Régis Brouard (until 29 February 2016); Jean-Philippe Faure and Carl Tourenne (interim, from 1 March 2016)
- Stadium: Stade René Gaillard
- Ligue 2: 16th
- Coupe de France: Round of 32
- Coupe de la Ligue: First round
- Top goalscorer: League: Andé Dona Ndoh (13); All: Andé Dona Ndoh (14)
- Highest home attendance: 5,612 vs Bourg-Péronnas (22 April 2016)
- Lowest home attendance: 3,081 vs Nîmes (18 September 2015)
Home colours	Away colours

The 2015–16 season was the 90th season in the history of the French association football club Chamois Niortais. The senior team competed in Ligue 2 for the fourth consecutive season following an 11th-placed finish in 2014–15. The club also competed in both the Coupe de France and the Coupe de la Ligue.

Niort achieved a 16th-place finish in Ligue 2, reached the tenth round of the Coupe de France, and the first round of the Coupe de la Ligue.

== Competitions ==
=== Ligue 2 ===
==== League table ====
Pos	Team	Pld	W	D	L	GF	GA	GD	Pts	Promotion or Relegation
14	Nîmes (Note: Nîmes was docked 8 points for match fixing in the 2013–14 season.)	38	13	12	13	50	52	−2	43	
15	Sochaux	38	9	15	14	34	36	−2	42	
16	Niort	38	8	18	12	38	45	−7	42	
17	Ajaccio	38	9	15	14	34	42	−8	42	
18	Evian (Note: Evian was demoted due to financial difficulties.) (R, D)	38	9	12	17	41	41	0	39	Demotion to Division d'Honneur Régionale

Source: Ligue 2
Rules for classification: 1) points; 2) goal difference; 3) number of goals scored; 4) head-to-head goal difference; 5) fair play points
(D) Disqualified; (R) Relegated

==== Results summary ====
Overall								Home						Away					
Pld	W	D	L	GF	GA	GD	Pts	W	D	L	GF	GA	GD	W	D	L	GF	GA	GD
38	8	18	12	38	45	−7	42	4	9	6	18	20	−2	4	9	6	20	25	−5

Last updated: 13 May 2016.
Source: LFP.fr

==== Matches ====
Win Draw Loss

31 July 2015 1	Chamois Niortais	0–1	Valenciennes	Stade René Gaillard, Niort
20:00	Koukou (yellow card) 45'; Choplin (yellow card) 61'	Report	Fulgini 4'; Adbelhamid (yellow card) 27'; Slidja (yellow card) 55'; Kaboré (red card) 81'	Attendance: 4,298; Referee: Jérôme Brisard

7 August 2015 2	Dijon	3–0	Chamois Niortais	Stade Gaston Gérard, Dijon
20:00	Tavares 9', 90'; Jullien (yellow card) 22'; Bamba (yellow card) 37'; Gastien (yellow card) 64'; Diony 79'	Report	Koné (yellow card) 21'; Malcuit (yellow card) 35'	Attendance: 6,619; Referee: Stéphanie Frappart

14 August 2015 3	Chamois Niortais	1–1	Sochaux	Stade René Gaillard, Niort
20:00	Koukou 85'; Malcuit (yellow card) 90+4'	Report	Toko Ekambi 11'; Tardieu (yellow card) 58'	Attendance: 3,505; Referee: Florent Batta

21 August 2015 4	Évian Thonon Gaillard	0–0	Chamois Niortais	Parc des Sports, Annecy
20:00	Centonze (yellow card) 55'; Touré (yellow card) 73'; Altolaguirre (yellow card) 78'	Report	Lahaye (yellow card) 90+3'	Attendance: 4,103; Referee: Thomas Leonard

28 August 2015 5	Chamois Niortais	0–1	Laval	Stade René Gaillard, Niort
20:00	Kiki (yellow card) 54'; Rocheteau (yellow card) 59'	Report	Alioui 52'; Alla (yellow card) 80'	Attendance: 3,656; Referee: Jérémy Stinat

11 September 2015 6	Nancy	1–1	Chamois Niortais	Stade Marcel Picot, Nancy
20:00	Aït Bennasser (yellow card) 45'; Hadji 71'; Lenglet (yellow card) 81'	Report	Koukou (yellow card) 76'; Rocheteau 82'	Attendance: 14,032; Referee: Olivier Thual

18 September 2015 7	Chamois Niortais	1–0	Nîmes	Stade René Gaillard, Niort
20:00	Dabasse (yellow card) 18'; Selemani (yellow card) 42'; Choplin (yellow card) 56'; Dona Ndoh 72'	Report	Marin (yellow card) 34'; Maoulida (yellow card) 39'; Harek (red card) 40'; Cissokho (yellow card) 82'; Azouni (yellow card) 90'	Attendance: 3,081; Referee: Floris Aubin

22 September 2015 8	Brest	1–1	Chamois Niortais	Stade Francis-Le Blé, Brest
21:00	Platje 2'; Grougi (yellow card) 9'; Lorenzi (yellow card) 87'; Alphonse (yellow card) 90'; Koubemba (yellow card) 90+3'	Report	Dona Ndoh 18'; Omrani (yellow card) 44'; Kiki (red card) 60'	Attendance: 5,714; Referee: Aurélien Petit

25 September 2015 9	Chamois Niortais	1–1	Clermont Foot	Stade René Gaillard, Niort
20:00	Da Veiga (yellow card) 43'; Lahaye (yellow card) 83'; Koukou 89'	Report	Espinosa (yellow card) 8'; Jobello (yellow card) 34'; Avinel (yellow card) 56'; Diedhiou 70'; Rivieyran (red card) 86'	Attendance: 3,268; Referee: Sylvain Palhies

2 October 2015 10	Le Havre	0–0	Chamois Niortais	Stade Océane, Le Havre
20:00	Louiserre (yellow card) 41'; Bonnet (yellow card) 76'; Fortès (yellow card) 76'	Report	Bong (yellow card) 30'; Rocheteau (yellow card) 32'; Roye (yellow card) 40'	Attendance: 5,293; Referee: Stéphanie Frappart

16 October 2015 11	Chamois Niortais	2–3	Auxerre	Stade René Gaillard, Niort
20:00	Dona Ndoh 13', 61'; Choplin (yellow card) 74'	Report	Puygrenier 7'; Ba 20'; Courtet 34'; Diaw (yellow card) 62'; Berthier (yellow card) 90+3'	Attendance: 3,566; Referee: Jérémy Stinat

23 October 2015 12	Paris	1–1	Chamois Niortais	Stade Charléty, Paris
20:00	Mogni 75'; Tahrat (yellow card) 81'; Keita (yellow card) 83'	Report	Djigla (yellow card) 63'; Dona Ndoh 79'	Attendance: 2,986; Referee: Sébastien Moreira

30 October 2015 13	Chamois Niortais	3–1	Ajaccio	Stade René Gaillard, Niort
20:00	Dona Ndoh 7'; Choplin (red card) 24'; Roye (yellow card) 30'; Selemani (yellow card) 36', (goal) 71'; Sambia 83'	Report	Cavalli 25' (pen.); Panyukov (yellow card) 29'; Diallo (red card) 77'; Madri (yellow card) 86'	Attendance: 3,476; Referee: Hamid Guenaoui

6 November 2015 14	Chamois Niortais	1–1	Metz	Stade René Gaillard, Niort
20:00	Lahaye (yellow card) 41'; Sans 71'	Report	Ngbakoto 42'; Lejeune (yellow card) 51'; Gomes (yellow card) 54'; Mandjeck (yellow card) 90+3'	Attendance: 4,570; Referee: William Lavis

24 November 2015 15	Lens	1–1	Chamois Niortais	Stade Bollaert-Delelis, Lens
20:00 (CET)	Cyprien (yellow card) 8'; Besle (yellow card) 42'; Bourigeaud 52'; Landre (yellow card) 67'	Report	Kiki 9', (yellow card) 53'; Roye (yellow card) 26'; Sambia (yellow card) 82'	Attendance: 26,337; Referee: Florent Batta

27 November 2015 16	Chamois Niortais	0–0	Red Star	Stade René Gaillard, Niort
20:00 (CET)	Lahaye (yellow card) 7'	Report	da Cruz (yellow card) 11'; Amieux (yellow card) 41'; Ngamukol (yellow card) 60'	Attendance: 3,292; Referee: Didier Falcone

1 December 2015 17	Bourg-Péronnas	2–1	Chamois Niortais	Stade Marcel-Verchère, Bourg-en-Bresse
21:00 (CET)	Berthomier 10'; Dembélé (yellow card) 16'; Traoré (yellow card) 75'; Dimitriou 86', (yellow card) 88'; Sané (yellow card) 90+3'	Report	Bong (red card) 42'; Sambia (yellow card) 70'; Sans (yellow card) 89'; Dona Ndoh 90+2'	Attendance: 1,747; Referee: Olivier Thual

11 December 2015 18	Chamois Niortais	0–0	Tours	Stade René Gaillard, Niort
20:00 (CET)	Choplin (yellow card) 56'	Report	Bouhours (yellow card) 9'; Gradit (yellow card) 44'; Louvion (yellow card) 90'	Attendance: 3,336; Referee: Thomas Leonard

18 December 2015 19	Créteil	2–3	Chamois Niortais	Stade Dominique Duvauchelle, Créteil
20:00 (CET)	Montaroup (yellow card) 5', (yellow card) 82' (red card); Esor (yellow card) 35'; Dabo 39', (yellow card) 50'; Diedhiou 64', (yellow card) 90'	Report	Kiki (yellow card) 8'; Sans (yellow card) 14'; Rocheteau 42'; Choplin (yellow card) 84'; Dona Ndoh 86'; Djigla 89'	Attendance: 1,883; Referee: Sylvain Palhies

8 January 2016 20	Chamois Niortais	2–2	Dijon	Stade René Gaillard, Niort
20:00 (CET)	Bamba 6' (o.g.); Koukou (yellow card) 18'; Bong (yellow card) 37'; Koné 77'	Report	Amalfitano (yellow card) 12'; Koukou 16' (o.g.); Gastien (yellow card) 30'; Bernard (yellow card) 34'; Andonian (yellow card) 58' (goal) 90+2'	Attendance: 3,342; Referee: Alexandre Castro

15 January 2016 21	Sochaux	2–3	Chamois Niortais	Stade Auguste Bonal, Montbéliard
20:00 (CET)	Cissé 2' (yellow card) 24' (goal) 45+1'; Robinet (yellow card) 47'	Report	Kiki (yellow card) 18'; Teikeu 40' (o.g.); Tigroudja 48'; Koné 79'	Attendance: 5,934; Referee: Jérôme Brisard

23 January 2016 22	Chamois Niortais	0–3	Évian Thonon Gaillard	Stade René Gaillard, Niort
14:00 (CET)	Choplin (yellow card) 6'; Koné (yellow card) 22'; Roye (yellow card) 70'	Report	Hoggas 38'; Keita 56'; Barbosa (yellow card) 59'; Campanharo 82'	Attendance: 3,409; Referee: Stéphanie Frappart

29 January 2016 23	Laval	0–0	Chamois Niortais	Stade Francis Le Basser, Laval
20:00 (CET)	Couturier (yellow card) 10'; Gonçalves (yellow card) 45+2'; Mukiele (yellow card) 61'	Report	Koné (yellow card) 45'	Attendance: 4,347; Referee: Aurélien Petit

2 February 2016 24	Chamois Niortais	0–0	Nancy	Stade René Gaillard, Niort
21:00 (CET)	Batisse (yellow card) 59', (yellow card) 67' (red card); Rocheteau (yellow card) 63'; Selemani (yellow card) 72'	Report	Diakhaté (yellow card) 52'; Cuffaut (yellow card) 82'; Aït Bennasser (yellow card) 86'; Badila (yellow card) 89'; Cétout (yellow card) 90+1'	Attendance: 3,323; Referee: Yohann Rouinsard

5 February 2016 25	Nîmes	1–0	Chamois Niortais	Stade des Costières, Nîmes
20:00	Koura 63'; Savanier (yellow card) 85'	Report	Selemani (yellow card) 56'	Attendance: 8,076; Referee: Romain Lissorgue

12 February 2016 26	Chamois Niortais	1–2	Brest	Stade René Gaillard, Niort
20:00	Choplin (yellow card) 18'; Sambia (yellow card) 26'; Bouardja 43'; Dabasse (yellow card) 90+1'	Report	Sané (yellow card) 29', (yellow card) 72' (red card); Battocchio 31'; Alphonse 69'	Attendance: 3,188; Referee: William Lavis

19 February 2016 27	Clermont Foot	2–1	Chamois Niortais	Stade Gabriel Montpied, Clermont-Ferrand
20:00	Rivieyran (yellow card) 44'; Salze (yellow card) 64'; Dugimont 69'; Laborde 86'	Report	Bong (yellow card) 21'; Sambia (yellow card) 51'; Dona Ndoh (yellow card) 74', (goal) 90+4'	Attendance: 3,007; Referee: Stéphanie Frappart

26 February 2016 28	Chamois Niortais	0–0	Le Havre	Stade René Gaillard, Niort
20:00	Sambia (yellow card) 16'	Report	Cambon (yellow card) 27'; Fontaine (yellow card) 34'; Ayasse (yellow card) 78'	Attendance: 3,250; Referee: Romain Delpech

4 March 2016 29	Auxerre	1–1	Chamois Niortais	Stade Abbé Deschamps, Auxerre
20:00	Puygrenier (yellow card) 7'; Courtet 34', (yellow card) 88'; Lefebvre (yellow card) 45+1'	Report	Dona Ndoh (yellow card) 26'; Sambia 27'; Bong (yellow card) 88'	Attendance: 4,474; Referee: Willy Delajod

11 March 2016 30	Chamois Niortais	2–1	Paris	Stade René Gaillard, Niort
20:00	Omrani (yellow card) 45+2'; Roye 58' (pen.), (yellow card) 72', (goal) 90' (pen.); Delecroix (yellow card) 90+1'; Koné (yellow card) 90+3'	Report	Tahrat 7'; Keïta (yellow card) 25'; Mohsni (yellow card) 57'; Lybohy (red card) 68'; Diarra (yellow card) 72'; Cantini (yellow card) 90'	Attendance: 3,534; Referee: Alexandre Perreau Niel

18 March 2016 31	Ajaccio	2–0	Chamois Niortais	Stade François Coty, Ajaccio
20:00	Nouri (yellow card) 44', (goal) 83'; Cavalli 59'; Diabate (yellow card) 60'; Marchetti (yellow card) 67'	Report	Koukou (yellow card) 37'	Attendance: 3,486; Referee: Florent Batta

1 April 2016 32	Metz	2–0	Chamois Niortais	Stade Saint-Symphorien, Metz
20:00	Diallo 37', 58'	Report	Bong (yellow card) 64'	Attendance: 11,043; Referee: Romain Lissorgue

8 April 2016 33	Chamois Niortais	0–1	Lens	Stade René Gaillard, Niort
20:00	Dona Ndoh (yellow card) 57'; Omrani (yellow card) 61'; Roye (yellow card) 78'	Report	Cyprien 77'; Nomenjanahary (yellow card) 90'	Attendance: 4,951; Referee: Jérôme Brisard

15 April 2016 34	Red Star	0–2	Chamois Niortais	Stade Pierre Brisson, Beauvais
20:00	Da Cruz (yellow card) 74'	Report	Dona Ndoh 16'; Koukou (yellow card) 82'; Selemani 89'	Attendance: 1,304; Referee: Thomas Leonard

22 April 2016 35	Chamois Niortais	0–0	Bourg-Péronnas	Stade René Gaillard, Niort
20:00	Sans (yellow card) 41'	Report	Sané (yellow card) 45'; N'Simba (yellow card) 75'	Attendance: 5,612; Referee: Jérémy Stinat

29 April 2016 36	Tours	1–2	Chamois Niortais	Stade de la Vallée du Cher, Tours
20:00	Santamaria 13'; Belkebla (yellow card) 37'	Report	Batisse (yellow card) 53'; Roye (yellow card) 67'; Choplin (yellow card) 78'; Dabasse 82'; Koné 90+1'	Attendance: 6,829; Referee: Aurélien Petit

6 May 2016 37	Chamois Niortais	4–2	Créteil	Stade René Gaillard, Niort
20:45	Choplin 7'; Roye 35' (pen.), 38'; Omrani (yellow card) 53'; Djigla (yellow card) 56'; Dona Ndoh 65'	Report	Diedhiou 13', (yellow card) 61'; Gérard 21'; Ilunga (yellow card) 25'; Kerboriou (red card) 30'; Dabo (yellow card) 34', (red card) 71'; Hérelle (yellow card) 34'	Attendance: 6,211; Referee: Tony Chapron

13 May 2016 38	Valenciennes	3–3	Chamois Niortais	Stade du Hainaut, Valenciennes
20:45	Mbenza 9', 11'; Aloé (red card) 45+2' da Costa 65'	Report	Dona Ndoh 15', 23'; Selemani 51'	Attendance: 16,582; Referee: Thomas Leonard

=== Coupe de France ===
Niort entered the Coupe de France in the seventh round along with the other Ligue 2 clubs. For their opening fixture of the 2015–16 edition of the competition, Niort were drawn away at sixth-tier club La Rochelle. The team progressed to the next stage with a 5–1 victory which included a brace from Seydou Koné and a first-half goal by debutant Quentin Daubin.

==== Matches ====
14 November 2015 Seventh round	La Rochelle (6)	1–5	Chamois Niortais	Stade François Le Parco, La Rochelle
18:00 (CET)	Kahramanka 78'	Report	Batisse 12'; Daubin 39'; Selemani 43'; Koné 49', 60'	Referee: Yohann Rouinsard

5 December 2015 Eighth round	Chamois Niortais	3–1	Les Herbiers (3)	Stade René Gaillard, Niort
18:00 (CET)	Roye 4'; Rocheteau 16'; Koné (yellow card) 26', (goal) 78'	Report	Leybros (yellow card) 24'; Gace (yellow card) 44'; Glombard 51', (yellow card) 85'; Dudouit (yellow card) 70'	Referee: Stéphanie Frappart

2 January 2016 Round of 64	AS Moulins (4)	1–2	Chamois Niortais	Stade Hector Rolland, Moulins
18:30 (CET)	Chalier 20' (yellow card) 45'; Suchet (yellow card) 28'; Diaby (yellow card) 45'; Allouache (yellow card) 56'; Rouchon (yellow card) 90+4'	Report	Dona Ndoh 6'; Roye (yellow card) 11' (goal) 45+1' (pen.); Tigroudja (yellow card) 34'; Bong (yellow card) 45'	Attendance: 2,000; Referee: Florent Batta

19 January 2016 Round of 32	Sarre-Union (4)	1–0	Chamois Niortais	Stade Omnisports, Sarre-Union
19:00 (CET)	Zerbini (yellow card) 11'; Ozcan (yellow card) 30'; Schneider (yellow card) 55'; Schermann 90'	Report	Kiki (yellow card) 84'; Batisse (yellow card) 89'	Attendance: 2,700; Referee: Hakim Ben El Hadj

=== Coupe de la Ligue ===
Niort, aiming to progress past the first round of the Coupe de la Ligue for the first time since 2012, were handed an away tie at Sochaux in their opening game. Despite goals from Omrani and Koné, the home team—reduced to nine men in the second half—triumphed by three goals to two.

==== Matches ====
11 August 2015 First round	Sochaux	3–2	Chamois Niortais	Stade Auguste Bonal, Montbéliard
20:00	Cacérès 51', 60'; Senzemba (yellow card) 58', (red card) 82'; Sao 68'; Ilaimaharitra (red card) 72'	Report	Rocheteau (yellow card) 50'; Omrani 56'; Koné 72'	Attendance: 5,524; Referee: Alexandre Perreau Niel

== Appearances and goals ==
As of 13 May 2016.

No.	Pos.	Nat.	Name	League		Cup		League Cup		Total		Discipline	
No.	Pos.	Nat.	Name	Apps	Goals	Apps	Goals	Apps	Goals	Apps	Goals	A yellow rectangle, denoting the yellow penalty card shown to a player being cautioned	A red rectangle, denoting the red penalty card shown to a player being sent off
1	GK	FRA	Paul Delecroix	33	0	1	0	1	0	35	0	1	0
2	DF	FRA	~~Kévin Malcuit~~ †	4	0	0	0	0	0	4	0	2	0
3	DF	BEN	David Kiki	24 (1)	1	3	0	0	0	28	1	5	1
5	DF	FRA	Matthieu Sans	20 (2)	1	3	0	1	0	26	1	3	0
7	MF	BEN	David Djigla	16 (15)	1	1 (1)	0	1	0	34	1	2	0
8	MF	FRA	~~Florian Martin~~ †	1	0	0	0	0	0	1	0	0	0
8	MF	FRA	Faïz Selemani	30	3	3	1	0	0	33	4	4	0
9	FW	CMR	Andé Dona Ndoh	23 (13)	13	2	1	0 (1)	0	39	14	3	0
10	MF	ALG	Abdelhakim Omrani	18	0	0	0	1	1	19	1	4	0
11	FW	FRA	Adrian Dabasse	3 (9)	1	0 (2)	0	0	0	14	1	2	0
12	FW	CIV	Seydou Koné	20 (9)	3	3 (1)	3	1	1	34	7	5	0
14	MF	FRA	Chafik Tigroudja	10 (8)	1	3	0	0 (1)	0	22	1	1	0
16	GK	BEN	Saturnin Allagbé	5	0	3	0	0	0	8	0	0	0
17	MF	FRA	Antoine Batisse	8 (4)	0	2 (1)	1	0	0	15	1	1	1
18	FW	FRA	Kévin Rocheteau	18 (5)	2	3	1	1	0	27	3	4	0
19	MF	FRA	Jimmy Roye	36	4	3	2	1	0	40	6	6	0
20	FW	FRA	Jérémy Grain	0 (1)	0	0	0	0	0	1	0	0	0
21	DF	FRA	Jérémy Choplin	33	1	2 (1)	0	0 (1)	0	37	1	8	1
22	MF	CMR	Daouda Bassock	1 (6)	0	1	0	0	0	8	0	0	0
23	DF	FRA	Tristan Lahaye	35	0	2	0	1	0	38	0	4	0
24	MF	BEN	Djiman Koukou	34 (4)	2	2	0	1	0	41	2	5	0
25	DF	FRA	Thomas-Steven Da Veiga	3	0	0	0	1	0	4	0	1	0
26	MF	FRA	Messaoud Bouardja	1 (9)	1	1	0	0	0	11	1	0	0
27	DF	CMR	Frédéric Bong	21	0	3	0	1	0	25	0	6	1
30	GK	FRA	Arthur Desmas	0	0	0	0	0	0	0	0	0	0
33	DF	FRA	Junior Sambia	21 (10)	2	2 (2)	0	0	0	35	2	5	0
34	DF	FRA	Junior Assoumou	0	0	0 (1)	0	0	0	1	0	0	0
—	MF	FRA	Quentin Daubin	0	0	1	1	0	0	1	1	0	0
