= 2014–15 Chamois Niortais F.C. season =

Chamois Niortais
2014–15 season
- Chairman: Joël Coué
- Manager: Régis Brouard
- Stadium: Stade René Gaillard
- Ligue 2: 11th
- Coupe de France: Round of 64
- Coupe de la Ligue: First round
- Top goalscorer: League: Seydou Koné (15); All: Seydou Koné (17)
- Highest home attendance: 7,442 vs Auxerre (8 May 2015)
- Lowest home attendance: 3,804 vs Dijon (13 February 2015)

The 2014–15 season was the 89th season in the history of the French association football club Chamois Niortais. The senior team competed in Ligue 2, finishing in 11th place. The club also competed in both the Coupe de France and the Coupe de la Ligue, in which they reached the Round of 64 and the First Round respectively.

== Competitions ==
=== Ligue 2 ===
==== League table ====
Pos	Team	Pld	W	D	L	GF	GA	GD	Pts	Promotion or Relegation
9	Auxerre	38	12	16	10	48	42	+6	52	
10	Sochaux	38	13	13	12	39	37	+2	52	
11	Niort	38	11	17	10	41	42	−1	50	
12	Clermont	38	12	13	13	43	47	−4	49	
13	Nîmes (Note: It was announced on 17 March 2015 that Nîmes would be relegated to the next lower level at the end of the season, as a sanction for match fixing the previous season. The decision was overturned on 20 May 2015.)	38	12	10	16	44	57	−13	46	Relegated in the 17th March 2015 and then readmitted in 20th May 2015.

Source: Ligue 2
Rules for classification: 1) points; 2) goal difference; 3) number of goals scored

==== Results summary ====
Overall								Home						Away					
Pld	W	D	L	GF	GA	GD	Pts	W	D	L	GF	GA	GD	W	D	L	GF	GA	GD
38	11	17	10	41	42	−1	50	7	8	4	22	20	+2	4	9	6	19	22	−3

==== Matches ====
Win Draw Loss

1 August 2014 1	Laval	1–1	Chamois Niortais	Stade Francis Le Basser, Laval, Mayenne
20:00 (CET)	Guerriero (yellow card) 19'; Zeoula 65'; Alla (yellow card) 70'	Report	Koné 54'; Koukou (yellow card) 61'; Roye (yellow card) 79'	Attendance: 5,483; Referee: Olivier Husset

8 August 2014 2	Chamois Niortais	0–0	Brest	Stade René Gaillard, Niort
20:00 (CET)	Koné (yellow card) 55'	Report	Doumbia (yellow card) 36'	Attendance: 4,713; Referee: Stéphanie Frappart

15 August 2014 3	Chamois Niortais	1–0	Le Havre	Stade René Gaillard, Niort
20:00 (CET)	Koné 2'	Report	Le Bihan (yellow card) 63'	Attendance: 4,797; Referee: Romain Delpech

22 August 2014 4	Créteil	1–1	Chamois Niortais	Stade Dominique Duvauchelle, Créteil
20:00 (CET)	Diedhiou (red card) 37'; Piquionne 40'; N'Doye (yellow card) 90'	Report	Houla (yellow card) 41'; Barbet (yellow card) 77'; Roye 90' (pen.)	Attendance: 1,601; Referee: Frank Schneider

29 August 2014 5	Chamois Niortais	0–0	Clermont Foot	Stade René Gaillard, Niort
20:00 (CET)	Barbet (yellow card) 60'; Bernard (yellow card) 75'	Report	Pagerie (yellow card) 84'	Attendance: 4,693; Referee: William Lavis

12 September 2014 6	Dijon	1–0	Chamois Niortais	Stade Gaston Gérard, Dijon
20:00 (CET)	Bamba (yellow card) 15'; Souprayen (yellow card) 19'; Mollet (yellow card) 42'; Cissé (yellow card) 77'; Rivière 90'	Report	Lahaye (yellow card) 24'; Ba (yellow card) 82'; Houla (yellow card) 86'	Attendance: 7,819; Referee: Florent Batta

19 September 2014 7	Chamois Niortais	3–0	Valenciennes	Stade René Gaillard, Niort
20:00 (CET)	Malcuit (yellow card) 27'; Lala 37' (o.g.); Ba 69', 84'	Report	Poepon (yellow card) 27'; Coulibaly (yellow card) 47', (yellow card) 55' (red card)	Attendance: 4,519; Referee: Thomas Leonard

23 September 2014 8	Troyes	4–1	Chamois Niortais	Stade de l'Aube, Troyes
20:55 (CET)	Jean 43'; Court 70'; Gimbert (yellow card) 82', (goal) 83', 88'; Pi (yellow card) 90'	Report	Martin 75'; Sans (yellow card) 84'	Attendance: 6,472; Referee: Floris Aubin

26 September 2014 9	Chamois Niortais	2–1	Angers	Stade René Gaillard, Niort
20:00 (CET)	Diaw (yellow card) 22'; Dona Ndoh 56'; Martin 86'	Report	Thomas 7'; Boufal (yellow card) 39'; Bouka Moutou (yellow card) 50'	Attendance: 4,853; Referee: Sylvain Palhies

3 October 2014 10	Ajaccio	0–0	Chamois Niortais	Stade François Coty, Ajaccio
20:00 (CET)	Gonçalves (yellow card) 78'; Deville (yellow card) 87'; Coulibaly (yellow card) 90'	Report	Malcuit (yellow card) 19'; Koné (yellow card) 73' (red card); Diaw (yellow card) 90'	Attendance: 4,107; Referee: Hamid Guenaoui

17 October 2014 11	Chamois Niortais	1–1	Orléans	Stade René Gaillard, Niort
20:00 (CET)	Martin (yellow card) 42'; Barbet 82'	Report	Sidibé (yellow card) 78'; Mendy 90'	Attendance: 4,519; Referee: Yohann Rouinsard

24 October 2014 12	Arles-Avignon	1–0	Chamois Niortais	Parc des Sports, Avignon
20:00 (CET)	Bonne (yellow card) 12'; Gigot (yellow card) 17'; Touré (yellow card) 76' van Kessel 80'	Report	Roye (yellow card) 63'; Koukou (yellow card) 84'	Attendance: 1,298; Referee: Stéphanie Frappart

1 November 2014 13	Chamois Niortais	1–4	Nancy	Stade René Gaillard, Niort
14:00 (CET)	Sans (yellow card) 22'; Koné 72'	Report	Dembélé 18', 62'; Malcuit 23' (o.g.); Sami (red card) 39'; Nardi (yellow card) 74'; Dalé 85'	Attendance: 5,344; Referee: Alexandre Castro

7 November 2014 14	Nîmes	3–2	Chamois Niortais	Stade des Costières, Nîmes
20:00 (CET)	Maoulida 44', 88'; Sartre 57'	Report	Koné 7', 45'; Koukou (yellow card) 56'; Roye (yellow card) 73'; Houla (yellow card) 87'	Attendance: 4,149; Referee: Sébastien Moreira

21 November 2014 15	Chamois Niortais	1–1	Tours	Stade René Gaillard, Niort
20:00 (CET)	Bong (yellow card) 9'; Diaw (yellow card) 36'; Barbet (yellow card) 56'; Koné 63'	Report	Adnane 10' (pen.); Santamaria (yellow card) 12'; Bouhours (yellow card) 30'; Chavalerin (yellow card) 70'	Attendance: 4,377; Referee: Didier Falcone

28 November 2014 16	Châteauroux	0–1	Chamois Niortais	Stade Gaston Petit, Châteauroux
20:00 (CET)	Hountondji (yellow card) 40'; Bain (yellow card) 53'	Report	Ba 44'	Attendance: 5,573; Referee: Thomas Leonard

12 December 2014 17	Chamois Niortais	0–1	Sochaux	Stade René Gaillard, Niort
20:00 (CET)	Ba (red card) 12'; Koukou (yellow card) 70'	Report	Tardieu (yellow card) 44'; Butin 50'; Habran (yellow card) 86'; Faussurier (yellow card) 90'	Attendance: 4,266; Referee: Florent Batta

19 December 2014 18	Auxerre	1–1	Chamois Niortais	Stade Abbé Deschamps, Auxerre
20:00 (CET)	Gragnic (yellow card) 21'; Puygrenier (yellow card) 24'; Aguilar (yellow card) 41'; Berthier 79'	Report	Koné 4'; Bong (yellow card) 47'; Diaw (yellow card) 54'; Roye (red card) 79'	Attendance: 7,870; Referee: Olivier Husset

9 January 2015 19	Chamois Niortais	1–1	Gazélec Ajaccio	Stade René Gaillard, Niort
20:00 (CET)	Dona Ndoh (yellow card) 69', (goal) 82'	Report	Boutaïb 5', (yellow card) 25'; Ducourtioux (yellow card) 34'; Filippi (red card) 45'; Fall (red card) 75'; Martinez (yellow card) 89'	Attendance: 3,856; Referee: Lionel Jaffredo

16 January 2015 20	Brest	0–0	Chamois Niortais	Stade Francis-Le Blé, Brest
20:00 (CET)	Khaled (yellow card) 46'	Report	Diaw (yellow card) 15'; Bong (yellow card) 52'; Martin (yellow card) 72'	Attendance: 6,312; Referee: William Lavis

23 January 2015 21	Le Havre	1–1	Chamois Niortais	Stade Océane, Le Havre
20:00 (CET)	Sao 46'; Chebake (yellow card) 53'; Bonnet (yellow card) 76'	Report	Martin (yellow card) 24'; Roye 54'; Ba (yellow card) 76'	Attendance: 4,802; Referee: Alexandre Perreau Niel

30 January 2015 22	Chamois Niortais	1–3	Créteil	Stade René Gaillard, Niort
20:00 (CET)	Bernard (yellow card) 31'; Martin 63'; Koukou (yellow card) 64'; Dona Ndoh (yellow card) 82'	Report	Piquionne 2'; Dabo (yellow card) 32', (goal) 66'; Diarrassouba (yellow card) 74'; N'Doye 87'	Attendance: 3,962; Referee: Sylvain Palhies

6 February 2015 23	Clermont Foot	1–1	Chamois Niortais	Stade Gabriel Montpied, Clermont-Ferrand
20:00 (CET)	Bong 13' (o.g.)	Report	Koné 35'; Bong (yellow card) 42'; Roye (yellow card) 74'	Attendance: 2,088; Referee: Johan Hamel

13 February 2015 24	Chamois Niortais	1–1	Dijon	Stade René Gaillard, Niort
20:00 (CET)	Martin 18'; Bong (yellow card) 42', (yellow card) 61' (red card); Koukou (yellow card) 56'; Roche (yellow card) 64'	Report	Raspentino 58'; Varrault (yellow card) 71'; Bamba (yellow card) 84'; Paulle (yellow card) 90'	Attendance: 3,804; Referee: Olivier Husset

20 February 2015 25	Valenciennes	1–3	Chamois Niortais	Stade du Hainaut, Valenciennes
20:00 (CET)	Le Tallec 65' (pen.)	Report	Koné 13', 51'; Malcuit 42'; Delecroix (red card) 62'	Attendance: 6,902; Referee: Jean-Charles Cailleux

27 February 2015 26	Chamois Niortais	1–0	Troyes	Stade René Gaillard, Niort
20:00 (CET)	Roye 11'; Lahaye (yellow card) 37'; Koné (yellow card) 40'	[ Report]	Azamoum (yellow card) 42'; Rincón (yellow card) 61'; Saunier (red card) 83'; Bienvenu (yellow card) 88'	Attendance: 4,734; Referee: Hakim Ben El Hadj

6 March 2015 27	Angers	0–0	Chamois Niortais	Stade Jean Bouin, Angers
20:00 (CET)	Pessalli (yellow card) 43'; Angoula (yellow card) 85'	Report	Koukou (yellow card) 72'; Bong (yellow card) 84'; Bernard (yellow card) 88'	Attendance: 8,076; Referee: Thomas Leonard

13 March 2015 28	Chamois Niortais	1–0	Ajaccio	Stade René Gaillard, Niort
20:00 (CET)	Koné 18'; Barbet (yellow card) 70'; Dona Ndoh 90'	Report	Begeorgi (yellow card) 45'; Sainati (yellow card) 58'	Attendance: 4,188; Referee: Jérôme Miguelgorry

20 March 2015 29	Orléans	0–0	Chamois Niortais	Stade de la Source, Orléans
20:00 (CET)	Ligoule (yellow card) 81'	Report	Batisse (yellow card) 7'; Diaw (red card) 89'	Attendance: 3,634; Referee: Aurélien Petit

3 April 2015 30	Chamois Niortais	1–1	Arles-Avignon	Stade René Gaillard, Niort
20:00 (CET)	Bernard (yellow card) 15'; Malcuit 16'	Report	Rodriguez (yellow card) 24'; Koné 76'; Pinteaux (yellow card) 81'	Attendance: 4,135; Referee: Yohann Rouinsard

10 April 2015 31	Nancy	1–2	Chamois Niortais	Stade Marcel Picot, Nancy
20:00 (CET)	Dembélé 63' (pen.)	Report	Martin 33'; Barbet 59'; Malcuit (yellow card) 63'	Attendance: 15,363; Referee: Alexandre Perreau Niel

17 April 2015 32	Chamois Niortais	3–2	Nîmes	Stade René Gaillard, Niort
20:00 (CET)	Barbet (yellow card) 45'; Dona Ndoh 63', 82'; Koné 90'	Report	Sartre (yellow card) 19'; Hsissane (yellow card) 32'; Nouri 74'; Mendy 90'	Attendance: 4,530; Referee: Hakim Ben El Hadj

24 April 2015 33	Tours	1–0	Chamois Niortais	Stade de la Vallée du Cher, Tours
20:00 (CET)	Kouakou 42'	Report		Attendance: 6,793; Referee: Jean-Charles Cailleux

28 April 2015 34	Chamois Niortais	3–0	Châteauroux	Stade René Gaillard, Niort
20:30 (CET)	Dona Ndoh 48', 68'; Koné 79' (pen.)	Report		Attendance: 4,339; Referee: Johan Hamel

1 May 2015 35	Sochaux	2–3	Chamois Niortais	Stade Auguste Bonal, Montbéliard
20:00 (CET)	Habran 3', 14'; Gibaud (yellow card) 30'; Cacérès (yellow card) 67'	Report	Sans 31'; Koné 43'; Roye 68', (yellow card) 71'	Attendance: 8,980; Referee: Thomas Leonard

8 May 2015 36	Chamois Niortais	1–1	Auxerre	Stade René Gaillard, Niort
20:00 (CET)	Diaw (yellow card) 19'; Roye (yellow card) 34', (goal) 86'; Ba (yellow card) 85'	Report	Puygrenier (yellow card) 16'; Sammaritano 73'	Attendance: 7,442; Referee: Stéphanie Frappart

15 May 2015 37	Gazélec Ajaccio	3–2	Chamois Niortais	Stade Ange Casanova, Ajaccio
20:30 (CET)	Tshibumbu 19', 32', (yellow card) 20'; Pujol (yellow card) 23'; Filippi (yellow card) 49', (goal) 51'	Report	Roye 47'; Koné 54' (pen.); Diaw (yellow card) 59'; Rocheteau (yellow card) 87'	Attendance: 2,752; Referee: Alexandre Perreau Niel

22 May 2015 38	Chamois Niortais	0–3	Laval	Stade René Gaillard, Niort
20:30 (CET)	Bernard (yellow card) 20'; Barbet (yellow card) 57'	Report	Boumous 6'; Guirassy 16', 18'; Robic (yellow card) 30'	Attendance: 5,554; Referee: Romain Delpech

=== Coupe de France ===
15 November 2014 Seventh round	Chauvigny (6)	1–2	Chamois Niortais	Stade de la Pépinière, Poitiers
19:00 (CET)	Bouchaud 48', (yellow card) 73'	Report	Martin 11', 50'	Referee: Jérémy Stinat

6 December 2014 Eighth round	Genêts Anglet (5)	0–2	Chamois Niortais	Stade Saint-Jean, Anglet
18:00 (CET)	Daublain (yellow card) 35'	Report	Koukou 42'; Barbet (yellow card) 48'; Ba 54'	Attendance: 1,200; Referee: Éric Wattellier

3 January 2015 Round of 64	Concarneau (4)	1–0	Chamois Niortais	Stade de Kérampéru, Concarneau
18:30 (CET)	Koré 28'	Report	Bernard (yellow card) 74'	Attendance: 3,680; Referee: Yohann Rouinsard

=== Coupe de la Ligue ===
12 August 2014 First round	Arles-Avignon	3–2	Chamois Niortais	Parc des Sports, Avignon
20:00 (CET)	Ngakoutou 19', 54', 86'; N'Diaye (yellow card) 49'; Ouaamar (yellow card) 87'	Report	Koné 24', 70', (yellow card) 81'; Roye (yellow card) 65'	Attendance: 1,093; Referee: Alexandre Perreau Niel

== Appearances and goals ==
As of 19 December 2015.

No.	Pos.	Nat.	Name	League		Cup		League Cup		Total		Discipline	
No.	Pos.	Nat.	Name	Apps	Goals	Apps	Goals	Apps	Goals	Apps	Goals	A yellow rectangle, denoting the yellow penalty card shown to a player being cautioned	A red rectangle, denoting the red penalty card shown to a player being sent off
1	GK	FRA	Paul Delecroix	36	0	1	0	0	0	37	0	0	1
2	DF	FRA	Kévin Malcuit	29	2	2	0	1	0	32	2	3	0
3	DF	FRA	Lamine Fall	0	0	0	0	0	0	0	0	0	0
5	DF	FRA	Quentin Bernard	37	0	3	0	1	0	41	0	6	0
6	DF	FRA	Yoann Barbet	33	2	2	0	0	0	35	2	7	0
7	MF	FRA	~~Greg Houla~~ †	17	0	1	0	1	0	19	0	3	0
8	MF	FRA	Florian Martin	38	5	3	2	1	0	42	7	3	0
9	FW	CMR	Andé Dona Ndoh	34	6	3	0	0	0	37	6	3	0
10	MF	SEN	Mouhamadou Diaw	36	0	1	0	1	0	38	0	7	1
12	FW	CIV	Seydou Koné	35	15	2	0	1	2	38	17	4	1
13	FW	FRA	Mayingila N'Zuzi Mata	5	0	2	0	1	0	8	0	0	0
14	MF	FRA	Chafik Tigroudja	9	0	2	0	0	0	11	0	0	0
16	GK	FRA	Rodolphe Roche	3	0	2	0	1	0	6	0	1	0
17	MF	BFA	~~Louckmane Ouédraogo~~ †	0	0	0	0	0	0	0	0	0	0
18	MF	FRA	Kévin Rocheteau	9	0	2	0	0	0	11	0	1	0
19	MF	FRA	Jimmy Roye	34	6	2	0	1	0	37	6	7	1
20	MF	MRT	Adama Ba	27	3	2	1	1	0	30	4	3	1
21	DF	FRA	Matthieu Sans	31	1	2	0	1	0	34	1	2	0
23	DF	FRA	Tristan Lahaye	23	0	0	0	0	0	23	0	2	0
24	MF	BEN	Djiman Koukou	34	0	1	1	1	0	36	1	7	0
27	DF	CMR	Frédéric Bong	14	0	3	0	1	0	18	0	6	1
29	FW	FRA	~~Simon Hébras~~ †	6	0	0	0	1	0	7	0	0	0
30	GK	FRA	Lucas Bobe	0	0	0	0	0	0	0	0	0	0
33	MF	FRA	Antoine Batisse	7	0	3	0	0	0	10	0	1	0
34	MF	FRA	Junior Sambia	5	0	0	0	0	0	5	0	0	0
40	GK	BEN	Saturnin Allagbé	0	0	0	0	0	0	0	0	0	0
—	FW	FRA	Jérémy Grain	2	0	1	0	0	0	3	0	0	0
