= Kévin Malcuit =

French footballer (born 1991)

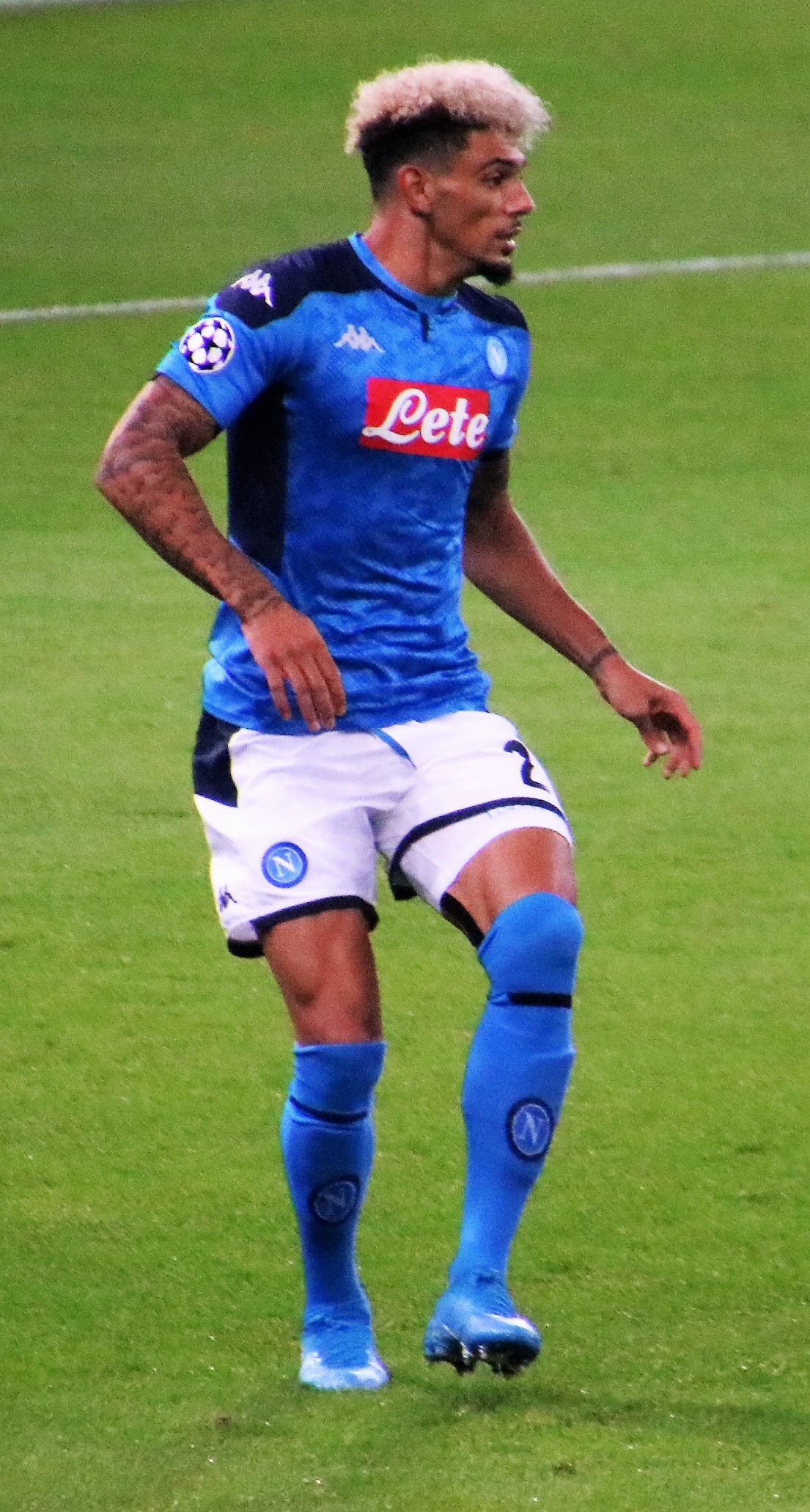
- Malcuit with Napoli in 2019

Personal information
- Date of birth: 31 July 1991 (age 35)
- Place of birth: Châtenay-Malabry, France
- Height: 1.78 m (5 ft 10 in)
- Position: Full-back

Youth career
- –2008: Racing Club
- 2008–2010: Monaco

Senior career*
Years	Team	Apps	(Gls)
2010–2012	Monaco II	39	(5)
2010–2012	Monaco	3	(0)
2012	→ Vannes (loan)	12	(2)
2012–2014	Fréjus Saint-Raphaël	38	(2)
2014–2015	Niort	39	(2)
2015–2017	Saint-Étienne	34	(0)
2017–2018	Lille	23	(0)
2018–2022	Napoli	38	(0)
2021	→ Fiorentina (loan)	5	(0)
2022–2023	Ankaragücü	20	(1)
- * Club domestic league appearances and goals as of 7 June 2023

Kévin Malcuit (born 31 July 1991) is a French professional footballer. He predominantly plays as a full-back. He is also capable of playing in a number of different positions, including as a winger and as an attacker.

Malcuit started his career with Monaco, but after finding his first-team opportunities limited and being sent out on loan to Vannes, he joined Fréjus Saint-Raphaël in the summer of 2012. Good performances in the Championnat National led to a return to professional football with Chamois Niortais in January 2014. During his time at Niort, he was named in the Ligue 2 Team of the Season for 2014–15. He played more than 40 matches in all competitions for the club during an 18-month spell before transferring to Saint-Étienne in August 2015.

== Club career ==
=== Early career ===
Malcuit was born in Châtenay-Malabry, a suburb of Paris. As a youth he represented Parisian side Racing Club before being scouted by Monaco at the age of 17. At Monaco, he began his senior career, breaking into the professional setup towards the end of the 2009–10 season. He was first included in the match-day squad for the Ligue 1 game against Lorient on 5 May 2010, although he was an unused substitute. He eventually made his debut early the following season, coming on as a late substitute for Vincent Muratori in the 0–0 draw with Toulouse on 18 September 2010. This proved to be his only senior appearance of the campaign, although he was a regular for the reserve side, making 28 appearances in the Championnat de France amateur.

After making four first-team appearances for Monaco during the first half of the 2011–12 season, two of them in the league, Malcuit was loaned to Championnat National side Vannes in January 2012 for the remainder of the season. He made his debut as a substitute for Mohamed Youssouf in the goalless draw with Chamois Niortais on 17 February 2012. Malcuit scored his first senior goal in the 2–2 draw away at Orléans on 1 March 2012. In total, he played 12 times for Vannes during his loan spell, scoring twice. Malcuit was released by Monaco in the summer of 2012 and subsequently returned to the Championnat National, signing for Fréjus Saint-Raphaël on a free transfer following a successful trial period. He went on to spend one-and-a-half seasons with the Varois club, making 38 league appearances and scoring two goals.

=== Niort ===
On 9 January 2014, it was announced that Ligue 2 side Chamois Niortais had signed Malcuit on an 18-month contract after agreeing a fee with Fréjus. He did not break into the first team immediately upon his arrival at Niort, and had to wait until 18 April 2014 to make his debut for the club, when he replaced Tristan Lahaye late in a 1–2 home defeat to Brest at the Stade René Gaillard. He went on to play in each of the final six matches of the season, two of them from a starting berth. During the 2014–15 campaign, Malcuit found himself a regular in the first team under new manager Régis Brouard, starting 28 of the club's 38 league fixtures that season. He was often utilised in a midfield role, preferred on the right wing to loan signing Adama Ba. Malcuit scored two goals during the 2014–15 season, including one in a 1–3 away win at Valenciennes on 20 February 2015. His performances led to him being named the best outfield player in Ligue 2 in 2014–15 by France Football magazine. He was also selected in the Ligue 2 Team of the Season alongside teammates Paul Delecroix and Florian Martin.

Despite links with a number of Ligue 1 clubs during the summer of 2015, including Nice and Bordeaux, Malcuit remained at Niort and featured in the opening four matches of the 2015–16 campaign.

=== Saint-Étienne ===
On 28 August 2015, Malcuit joined Saint-Étienne on a four-year contract, for a reported transfer fee of €800,000.

=== Lille ===
Malcuit signed a five-year contract with Ligue 1 rivals Lille on 8 July 2017, after being signed by Head Coach Marcelo Bielsa.

=== Napoli ===
On 8 August 2018, Malcuit signed to Italian Serie A side Napoli. The transfer fee paid to Lille was reported as €11 million plus possible bonuses.

=== Fiorentina ===
On 28 January 2021, Malcuit joined Fiorentina on loan until 30 June 2021.

=== Ankaragücü ===
On 8 September 2022, Malcuit signed a one-year contract with Süper Lig club Ankaragücü. He made his debut for the club on 18 September, coming on as a late substitute for Oğuz Ceylan in a 2–1 league win over Sivasspor.

== International career ==
Malcuit was called up to the Morocco national team in 2016. In October 2019, Malcuit had rejected the opportunity to play for Morocco internationally and that he harboured an ambition of playing for France.

== Personal life ==
Malcuit was born in France to a Mauritanian father and Moroccan mother. His brother Samir is also a professional footballer.

== Career statistics ==
As of match played 23 August 2025

Appearances and goals by club, season and competition
Club	Season	League			National Cup (Note: Including Coupe de France, Coppa Italia, Turkish Cup)		League Cup (Note: Including Coupe de la Ligue)		Other		Total	
Club	Season	Division	Apps	Goals	Apps	Goals	Apps	Goals	Apps	Goals	Apps	Goals
Monaco	2010–11	Ligue 1	1	0	0	0	0	0	—		1	0
Monaco	2011–12	Ligue 2	2	0	1	0	1	0	—		4	0
Monaco	Total		3	0	1	0	1	0	0	0	5	0
Vannes (loan)	2011–12	Championnat National	12	2	0	0	0	0	—		12	2
Fréjus Saint-Raphaël	2012–13	Championnat National	33	2	2	0	0	0	—		35	2
Fréjus Saint-Raphaël	2013–14	Championnat National	6	0	0	0	0	0	—		6	0
Fréjus Saint-Raphaël	Total		39	2	2	0	0	0	0	0	41	2
Niort	2013–14	Ligue 2	6	0	0	0	0	0	—		6	0
Niort	2014–15	Ligue 2	29	2	2	0	1	0	—		32	2
Niort	2015–16	Ligue 2	4	0	0	0	0	0	—		4	0
Niort	Total		39	2	2	0	1	0	0	0	42	2
Saint-Étienne	2015–16	Ligue 1	9	0	3	0	0	0	0	0	12	0
Saint-Étienne	2016–17	Ligue 1	25	0	2	0	0	0	7 (Note: Appearance(s) in UEFA Europa League)	0	34	0
Saint-Étienne	Total		34	0	5	0	0	0	7	0	46	0
Lille	2017–18	Ligue 1	23	0	1	0	1	0	—		25	0
Napoli	2018–19	Serie A	24	0	1	0	—		2	0	27	0
Napoli	2019–20	Serie A	4	0	0	0	—		2 (Note: Appearance(s) in UEFA Champions League)	0	6	0
Napoli	2020–21	Serie A	2	0	0	0	—		0	0	2	0
Napoli	2021–22	Serie A	8	0	1	0	—		4	0	13	0
Napoli	Total		38	0	2	0	0	0	8	0	48	0
Fiorentina (loan)	2020–21	Serie A	5	0	0	0	—		—		5	0
Ankaragücü	2022–23	Süper Lig	20	1	4	0	—		—		24	1
Career total			213	7	17	0	3	0	15	0	248	7
