= Rocheteau =

Rocheteau is a surname. Notable people with the surname include:

- Dominique Rocheteau (born 1955), French footballer
- Kévin Rocheteau (born 1993), French footballer
