= Jérémy Grain =

French footballer (born 1994)

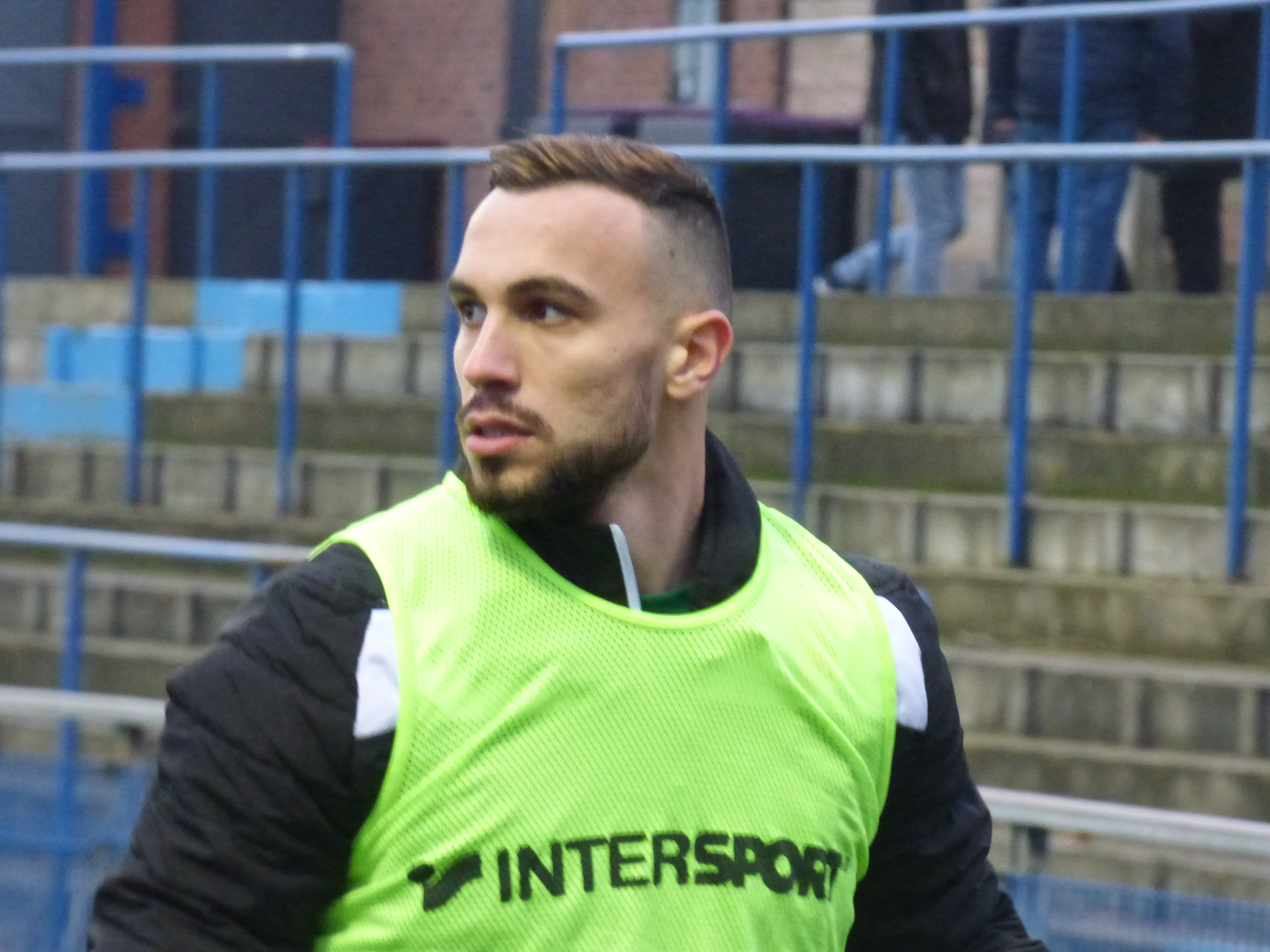
- Grain with Sedan in 2018

Personal information
- Date of birth: 21 October 1994 (age 32)
- Place of birth: Villeneuve-sur-Lot, France
- Height: 1.72 m (5 ft 8 in)
- Position: Striker

Team information
- Current team: FC Chauray
- Number: 28

Senior career*
Years	Team	Apps	(Gls)
2014–2016	Niort	3	(0)
2015–2016	→ Fréjus Saint-Raphaël (loan)	17	(4)
2015	Niort B	9	(3)
2016–2017	Boulogne	24	(4)
2017	Boulogne B	4	(1)
2017–2018	Sedan	25	(5)
2018–2019	Virton	32	(5)
2019–2020	Lyon-Duchère	19	(3)
2020–2021	Rouen	4	(0)
2021–2022	Bastia-Borgo	11	(0)
2022–2023	Le Puy	16	(0)
2023–2024	Trélissac	38	(4)
2024–2025	Bordeaux	24	(5)
2025–	FC Chauray	11	(3)
- * Club domestic league appearances and goals as of 6 December 2025

Jérémy Grain (born 21 October 1994) is a French professional footballer who plays as a striker for Championnat National 1 club FC Chauray.

== Career ==
A product of the Niort youth system, Grain made his senior debut for the club on 15 November 2014 in the 2–1 win against Chauvigny in the seventh round of the Coupe de France, coming on as a substitute for Florian Martin. He went on to make his first league appearance later that same season, replacing Djiman Koukou in the 1–3 home defeat to Créteil on 30 January 2015. Grain spent the second half of the 2015–16 season on loan at Fréjus Saint-Raphaël, where he scored four goals in 17 league appearances. He was released by Niort in the summer of 2016.

On 4 July 2016, Grain joined Championnat National side Boulogne on a free transfer. After a promising season with Boulogne, he signed for Championnat National 2 side Sedan.

In August 2018 Grain moved to Belgium, joining Belgian First Amateur Division side Excelsior Virton. He returned to France, with Lyon-Duchère, in August 2019, signing a one-year deal with an option for an extra year.

In July 2021, he signed with Bastia-Borgo. In January 2022, he joined Le Puy. In August 2024, he signed for Bordeaux.

== Career statistics ==
As of 28 August 2024

Appearances and goals by club, season and competition
Club	Season	League			National cup		Other		Total	
Club	Season	Division	Apps	Goals	Apps	Goals	Apps	Goals	Apps	Goals
Niort	2014–15	Ligue 2	2	0	1	0	0	0	3	0
Niort	2015–16	Ligue 2	1	0	0	0	0	0	1	0
Niort	Total		3	0	1	0	0	0	4	0
Niort B	2015–16	Championnat de France Amateur 2	9	3	—		—		9	3
Fréjus Saint-Raphaël (loan)	2015–16	Championnat National	17	3	1	0	0	0	18	4
Boulogne	2016–17	Championnat National	24	4	2	1	0	0	26	5
Boulogne B	2016–17	Championnat de France Amateur 2	4	1	—		—		4	1
Sedan	2017–18	Championnat National 2	25	5	0	0	0	0	25	5
Virton	2018–19	Belgian First Amateur Division	32	5	2	0	0	0	34	5
Lyon-Duchère	2019–20	Championnat National	19	3	0	0	0	0	19	3
Rouen	2020–21	Championnat National 2	4	0	2	0	—		6	0
Bastia-Borgo	2021–22	Championnat National	11	0	2	0	—		13	0
Le Puy	2021–22	Championnat National 2	14	0	0	0	—		14	0
Le Puy	2022–23	Championnat National	2	0	0	0	—		2	0
Le Puy	Total		16	0	0	0	—		16	0
Trélissac	2022–23	Championnat National 2	13	2	0	0	—		13	2
Trélissac	2023–24	Championnat National 2	25	2	4	0	—		29	2
Trélissac	Total		38	4	4	0	—		42	4
Bordeaux	2024–25	Championnat National 2	0	0	0	0	—		0	0
Career total			202	28	14	1	0	0	216	29

== Honours ==
Virton

- Belgian First Amateur Division: 2018–19

Le Puy

- Championnat National 2: 2021–22
