= Adrian Dabasse =

French footballer (born 1993)

Personal information
- Date of birth: 27 July 1993 (age 33)
- Place of birth: Toulouse, France
- Height: 1.87 m (6 ft 2 in)
- Position: Forward

Team information
- Current team: Nancy
- Number: 10

Youth career
- 2010–2013: Toulouse
- 2013–2015: Bordeaux

Senior career*
Years	Team	Apps	(Gls)
2015–2019	Niort	54	(4)
2017–2018	→ Les Herbiers (loan)	27	(5)
2019–2020	Cholet	8	(1)
2020–2022	Villefranche	52	(8)
2022–2024	Orléans	48	(11)
2024–	Nancy	44	(12)
- * Club domestic league appearances and goals as of 12 May 2026

Adrian Dabasse (born 27 July 1993) is a French professional footballer who plays as a forward for Ligue 2 club Nancy.

== Career ==
Dabasse came through the youth system at Toulouse and represented Bordeaux at reserve level before signing professional terms with Chamois Niortais in April 2015. He made his senior debut for Niort on 21 August 2015 in the Ligue 2 scoreless draw against Évian TG. His first senior goal came on 29 April 2016 against Tours FC.

In June 2017 Dabasse was loaned to Les Herbiers VF for the 2017–18 seasons, where he went on to play in the 2018 Coupe de France Final.

On 11 October 2019, he joined Championnat National club SO Cholet as a free agent, having been without a club since leaving Niort in the summer. In October 2020, after limited playing time, he joined fellow National club Villefranche.

On 9 June 2022, Dabasse signed with Orléans.

== Career statistics ==
As of match played 15 January 2021.

Appearances and goals by club, season and competition
Club	Season	League			Cup		League Cup		Total	
Club	Season	Division	Apps	Goals	Apps	Goals	Apps	Goals	Apps	Goals
Toulouse B	2012–13	CFA 2	18	5	—				18	5
Bordeaux B	2013–14	CFA	26	2	—				26	2
Bordeaux B	2014–15	CFA	27	9	—				27	9
Bordeaux B	Total		53	1	—				53	11
Niort	2015–16	Ligue 2	12	1	2	0	0	0	14	1
Niort	2016–17	Ligue 2	34	2	5	2	1	0	40	4
Niort	2018–19	Ligue 2	8	1	1	0	0	0	9	1
Niort	Total		54	4	8	2	1	0	63	5
Niort B	2015–16	CFA 2	12	2	—				12	2
Niort B	National 3	National 3	7	5	—				7	5
Niort B	Total		19	7	—				19	7
Les Herbiers (loan)	2017–18	National	27	5	7	1	0	0	34	6
Les Herbiers B (loan)	2017–18	National 3	1	0	—				1	0
Cholet	2019–20	National	7	1	0	0	0	0	7	1
Cholet	2020–21	National	1	0	0	0	0	0	1	0
Cholet	Total		8	1	0	0	0	0	8	1
Villefranche	2020–21	National	9	0	0	0	0	0	9	0
Career totals			189	33	15	3	1	0	205	36

== Honours ==
Les Herbiers

- Coupe de France runner-up: 2017–18

Nancy

- Championnat National: 2024–25
