= Daouda Bassock =

Cameroonian footballer

Personal information
- Full name: Daouda Bassock A Betchen
- Date of birth: 13 March 1995 (age 31)
- Place of birth: Douala, Cameroon
- Height: 1.67 m (5 ft 6 in)
- Position: Winger

Team information
- Current team: FC Chauray
- Number: 29

Youth career
- ÉFCB

Senior career*
| Years | Team | Apps | (Gls) |
| 2013–2015 | Chamois Niortais B | 45 | (6) |
| 2015–2017 | Chamois Niortais | 10 | (0) |
| 2019–2020 | Chamois Niortais B | 11 | (2) |
| 2020–2025 | Pouzauges Bocage | 42 | (11) |
| 2025– | FC Chauray | 4 | (0) |
- * Club domestic league appearances and goals as of 12 December 2025

Daouda Bassock A Betchen (born 13 March 1995) is a Cameroonian professional footballer who plays as a winger for French National 2 club FC Chauray.

== Career ==
Bassock was signed by Niort in 2013 at the age of 18 from the ÉFCB football academy in Cameroon, whose former graduates include Samuel Eto'o and Rigobert Song. He spent the next two years in the reserves, where he was part of the team that won promotion to the Championnat de France amateur 2 in the 2014–15 season. On 27 May 2015, it was announced that Bassock, along with fellow reserve team players Jérémy Grain and Antoine Batisse, had signed his first professional contract with Niort.

Bassock made his senior debut in the 3–0 defeat at Dijon in Ligue 2 on 7 August 2015, playing the first 53 minutes before being replaced by Junior Sambia.

== Career statistics ==
As of match played 5 May 2017

Appearances and goals by club, season and competition
| Club | Season | League | | | Coupe de France | | Coupe de la Ligue | | Total | |
| Club | Season | Division | Apps | Goals | Apps | Goals | Apps | Goals | Apps | Goals |
|---|---|---|---|---|---|---|---|---|---|---|
| Chamois Niortais | 2015–16 | Ligue 2 | 7 | 0 | 1 | 0 | 0 | 0 | 8 | 0 |
| Chamois Niortais | 2016–17 | Ligue 2 | 3 | 0 | 0 | 0 | 0 | 0 | 3 | 0 |
| Career total | | | 10 | 0 | 1 | 0 | 0 | 0 | 11 | 0 |
