= Pape Sané =

Senegalese footballer

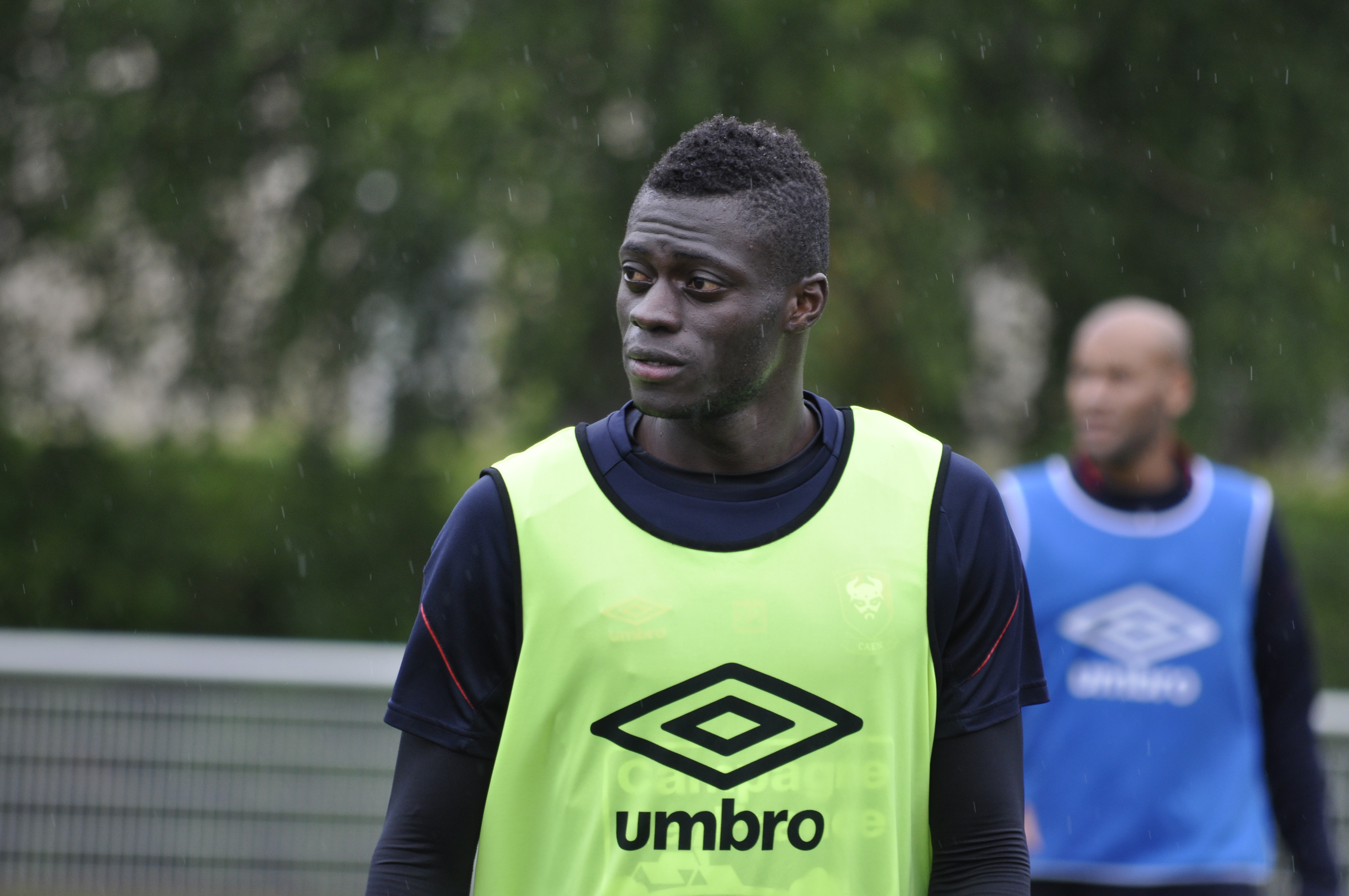
- Sané training with Caen in 2016

Personal information
- Date of birth: 30 December 1990 (age 35)
- Place of birth: Dakar, Senegal
- Height: 1.87 m (6 ft 2 in)
- Position: Forward

Team information
- Current team: Stade Beaucairois

Senior career*
Years	Team	Apps	(Gls)
2009–2011	ASC Diaraf		
2011–2013	Casa Sport		
2013–2015	Niort	7	(0)
2013–2014	→ Colmar (loan)	30	(5)
2013–2014	→ Colmar II (loan)	3	(1)
2014–2015	→ Bourg-Péronnas (loan)	32	(21)
2015–2016	Bourg-Péronnas	22	(10)
2016−2019	Caen	13	(1)
2016	→ Bourg-Péronnas (loan)	10	(2)
2017	Caen II	4	(3)
2017–2018	→ Auxerre (loan)	24	(5)
2018–2019	→ Nancy (loan)	9	(1)
2018–2019	→ Nancy II (loan)	10	(6)
2019–2021	Rodez	29	(5)
2020	Rodez II	1	(1)
2022–2023	Saint-Priest	29	(9)
2023	Hyères	5	(0)
2023–	Stade Beaucairois	10	(2)

International career^{‡}
2013	Senegal	1	(0)
- * Club domestic league appearances and goals as of 17 February 2024 ‡ National team caps and goals as of 28 July 2019

Pape Sané (born 30 December 1990) is a Senegalese professional footballer who plays as a striker for French Championnat National 3 club Stade Beaucairois. His earned one cap for the Senegal national team in 2013.

== Club career ==
Sané began his senior career with Dakar-based club ASC Diaraf and was part of the side that won the Senegalese Cup in 2009. The following year, he helped the side to their tenth Senegal Premier League title, their first in six seasons. Sané remained with Diaraf until the end of the 2011 campaign before transferring to Ziguinchor-based outfit Casa Sport. In 2012, he was the highest goalscorer in the Senegal Premier League, as the team won the national championship for the first time in their history.

In September 2012, Sané agreed a deal to join French Championnat National club Boulogne, but the transfer ultimately fell through. His move to France eventually materialised on 31 January 2013, when he signed for Ligue 2 side Chamois Niortais on the final day of the winter transfer window along with Benin international Djiman Koukou. He made seven league appearances for Niort, two of them starts, during the remainder of the 2012–13 campaign. On 8 August 2013, it was announced that Sané had agreed a season-long loan deal with Championnat National outfit Colmar. He went on to score five goals in 30 league matches for the Alsatian club as they ended the campaign fourth in the standings, narrowly missing out on promotion to Ligue 2.

On 9 August 2014, he was again sent out on a season-long loan deal to a Championnat National side, this time joining FC Bourg-Péronnas. He scored on his debut for the club the following week in the 1–2 home defeat to his former club Colmar. At the end of his loan spell at Bourg-Péronnas, during which he scored 21 goals and helped the club gain promotion to Ligue 2, it was announced that Sané would join the club on a permanent basis.

On 1 February 2016, Bourg-Péronnas announced Ligue 1 team Stade Malherbe Caen had signed Sané. However, he would finish the current 2015–16 Ligue 2 season on loan.

== International career ==
After finishing the 2012 season as the top goalscorer in the Senegalese league, Sané was called up to the Senegal national team for the friendly against Chile on 15 January 2013. He made his international début in the match and scored the opening goal of the game in the tenth minute, before being substituted for fellow debutant Alphonse Ba midway through the second half. Chile went on to win the match 2–1.

== Honours ==
ASC Diaraf

- Senegal Premier League: 2010
- Senegal FA Cup: 2009

Casa Sport

- Senegal Premier League: 2012
