= Thomas-Steven Da Veiga =

French footballer (born 1995)

Personal information
- Full name: Thomas-Steven Da Veiga
- Date of birth: 25 July 1995 (age 31)
- Place of birth: Neuilly-sur-Marne, France
- Height: 1.76 m (5 ft 9 in)
- Position: Left-back

Senior career*
Years	Team	Apps	(Gls)
2013–2015	Monaco	0	(0)
2013–2015	→ Monaco II	36	(1)
2015–2017	Niort	3	(0)
2015–2017	→ Niort II	23	(0)
2018–2019	San Roque de Lepe	4	(0)
2019–	Vitré	3	(0)
- * Club domestic league appearances and goals as of 20:05, 14 November 2019 (UTC)

Thomas-Steven Da Veiga (born 25 July 1995) is a French professional footballer who plays as a left-back for Vitré.

Born in Neuilly-sur-Marne, near Paris, Da Veiga played junior football for several local clubs before being signed by AS Monaco in 2010 at the age of 15. While at Monaco, he was part of the side that won the French under-19 championship in 2013. He was signed by Niort in the summer of 2015, one of two left-backs brought in to replace the outgoing Quentin Bernard.

Da Veiga made his professional debut for Niort on 11 August 2015, playing 77 minutes of the 2–3 defeat to Sochaux in the first round of the Coupe de la Ligue. He then played his first Ligue 2 game three days later, a 1–1 draw against the same opponents at the Stade René Gaillard. It was announced that he had left the club at the end of the 2015–16 season, but he was unable to find a new club and consequently remained with Niort until the end of his contract in 2017. In 2020, Da Viega left Vitre to join Belgian Division 1 Amateur club La Louviere Centre.

== Career statistics ==
As of 11 November 2016

Appearances and goals by club, season and competition
Club	Season	League			National cup		League cup		Total	
Club	Season	Division	Apps	Goals	Apps	Goals	Apps	Goals	Apps	Goals
Chamois Niortais	2015–16	Ligue 2	3	0	0	0	1	0	4	0
Chamois Niortais	2016–17	Ligue 2	0	0	0	0	0	0	0	0
Career total			3	0	0	0	1	0	4	0
