= Djiman Koukou =

Beninese footballer (born 1990)

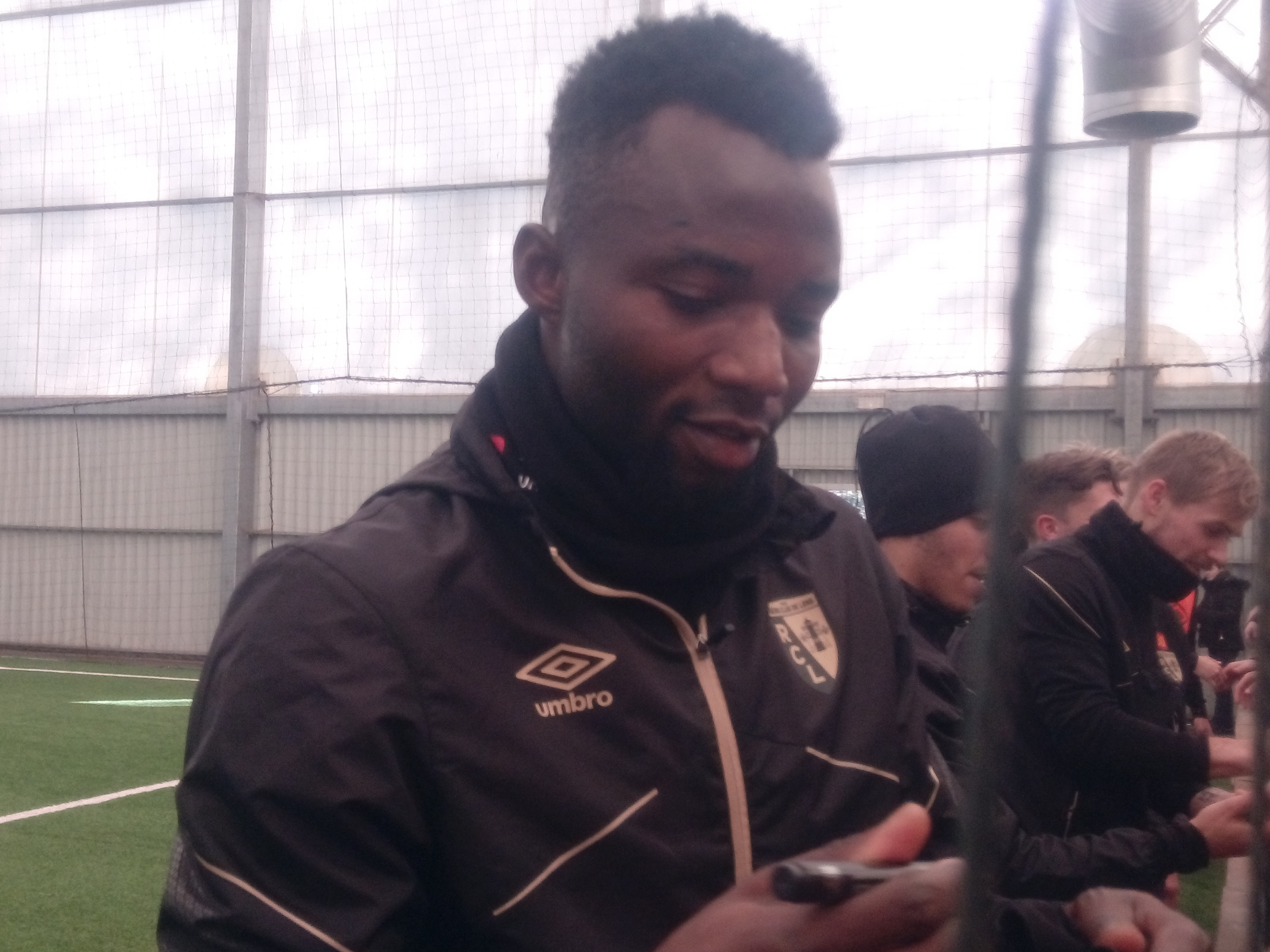
- Koukou in 2017

Personal information
- Full name: Djiman Waidi Koukou
- Date of birth: 14 November 1990 (age 35)
- Place of birth: Porto-Novo, Benin
- Height: 1.85 m (6 ft 1 in)
- Position: Midfielder

Senior career*
Years	Team	Apps	(Gls)
2004–2007	Requins	50	(7)
2007–2009	Soleil	37	(5)
2009–2010	Évian	15	(0)
2010–2011	Créteil	33	(1)
2011–2013	Beira-Mar	0	(0)
2011–2012	→ Belenenses (loan)	18	(0)
2012–2013	Montélimar	6	(0)
2013–2016	Niort	117	(3)
2016–2018	Lens	37	(1)
2018	Astra Giurgiu	4	(0)
2019–2021	Red Star	42	(1)
2021–2023	Les Herbiers VF	42	(0)

International career
2008–2021	Benin	42	(1)
- * Club domestic league appearances and goals as of 10:46, 21 October 2023 (UTC)

Djiman Waidi Koukou (born 14 November 1990) is a Beninese professional footballer who most recently played as a midfielder for French club Les Herbiers VF. He made 42 appearances for the Benin national team scoring once.

== Club career ==
Born in Porto-Novo, Koukou played for Requins de l'Atlantique FC and Soleil FC in his country. On 5 July 2009, he signed with Thonon Évian F.C. in France, going on to play two seasons in the third division.

After a successful year with US Créteil-Lusitanos, Koukou joined Portuguese club S.C. Beira-Mar in late June 2011, on a free transfer. He was immediately loaned to Segunda Liga team C.F. Os Belenenses, appearing in slightly more than half of the games during his only campaign.

Koukou failed to break into the first team with the Aveiro side, and returned to France in the summer of 2012. He trained with amateurs UMS Montélimar for several months, and eventually signed in February 2013.

In January 2013, Koukou went on trial with Chamois Niortais F.C. from Ligue 2. After training for 15 days, he was offered a contract until the end of the season by manager Pascal Gastien, and went on to compete with the team in three and a half second level seasons whilst playing 125 matches across all competitions.

In early July 2016, Koukou joined RC Lens – also of the French division two – on a two-year deal. He scored his first and only league goal for them on 28 November 2017, helping the hosts defeat AC Ajaccio 2–0.

Koukou moved to the Romanian Liga I on 28 September 2018, agreeing to a two-year contract at FC Astra Giurgiu. One year later, he returned to France and its third tier by signing with recently relegated Red Star FC.

== International career ==
Koukou made his debut for Benin in 2008, being selected for that year's Africa Cup of Nations. He earned his first cap on 7 September, in a 3–2 home win against Angola for the 2010 FIFA World Cup qualifiers.

== Career statistics ==
=== Club ===
As of 1 July 2021

Appearances and goals by club, season and competition
Club	Season	League			National cup		League cup		Other		Total	
Club	Season	Division	Apps	Goals	Apps	Goals	Apps	Goals	Apps	Goals	Apps	Goals
Évian	2009–10	National	15	0	0	0	0	0	–		15	0
Créteil	2010–11	National	33	1	2	0	0	0	–		35	1
Belenenses (loan)	2011–12	Segunda Liga	18	0	1	0	2	0	–		21	0
Niort	2012–13	Ligue 2	9	0	0	0	0	0	–		9	0
Niort	2013–14	Ligue 2	36	1	2	0	1	0	–		39	1
Niort	2014–15	Ligue 2	34	0	1	1	1	0	–		36	1
Niort	2015–16	Ligue 2	38	2	2	0	1	0	–		41	2
Niort	Total		117	3	5	1	3	0	0	0	125	4
Lens	2016–17	Ligue 2	20	0	3	0	2	0	–		25	0
Lens	2017–18	Ligue 2	17	1	4	0	2	1	–		23	2
Lens	Total		37	1	7	0	4	1	0	0	48	2
Astra Giurgiu	2018–19	Liga I	4	0	1	0	—		–		5	0
Red Star	2019–20	National	13	0	2	0	0	0	–		15	0
Red Star	2020–21	National	29	1	3	0	0	0	–		32	1
Red Star	Total		42	1	5	0	0	0	0	0	47	1
Career total			266	6	21	1	9	1	0	0	296	8
