= Messaoud Bouardja =

French footballer (born 1991)

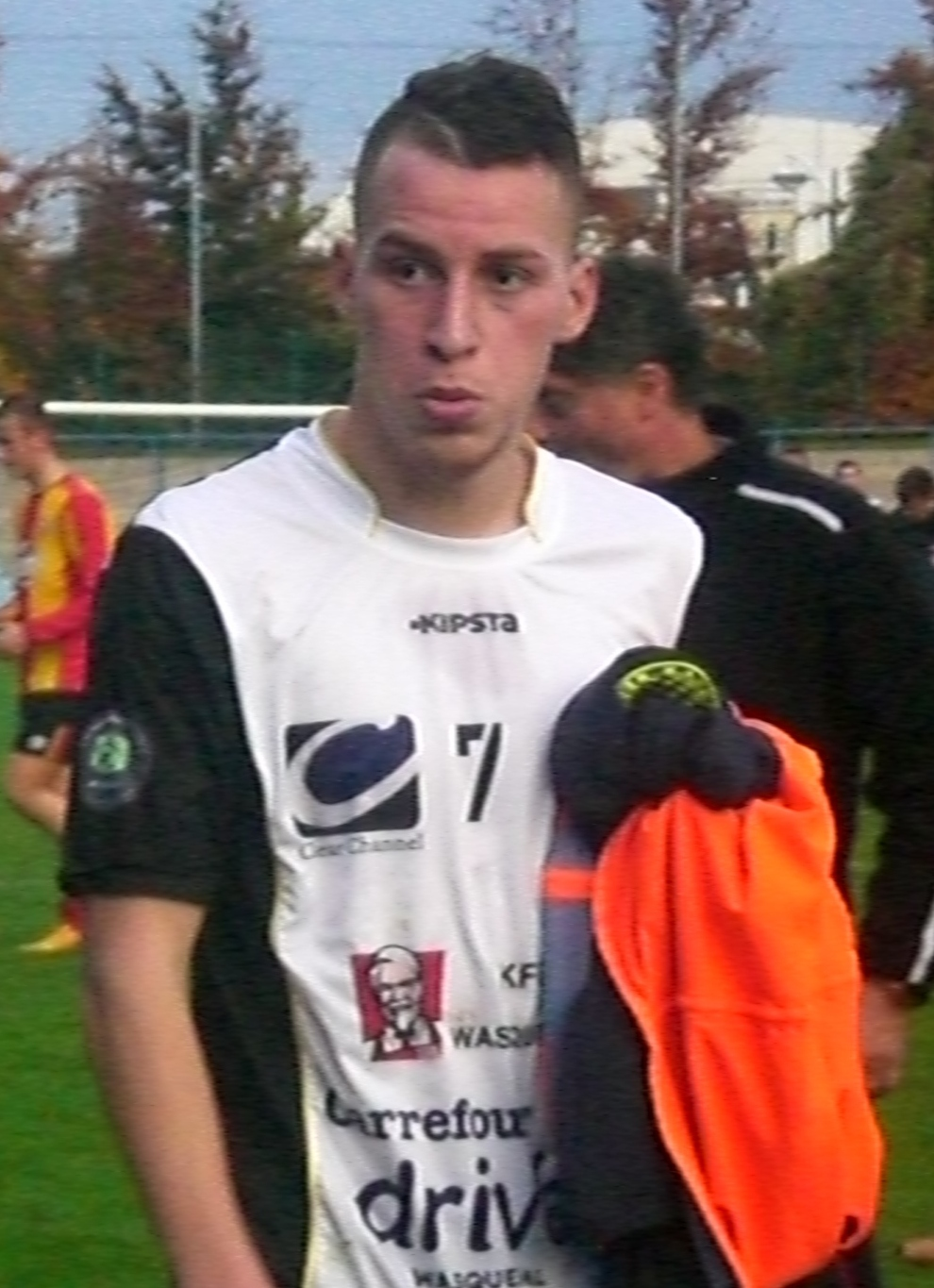
- Bouardja in 2015

Personal information
- Date of birth: 6 July 1991 (age 35)
- Place of birth: Lille, France
- Height: 1.76 m (5 ft 9 in)
- Position: Attacking midfielder

Team information
- Current team: Wasquehal
- Number: 26

Senior career*
Years	Team	Apps	(Gls)
2010–2013	IC Croix	?	(?)
2013–2016	Wasquehal	66	(28)
2016–2018	Chamois Niortais	14	(1)
2017	→ Wasquehal (loan)	5	(0)
2017–2018	→ Wasquehal (loan)	22	(5)
2018–2021	Feignies Aulnoye	37	(13)
2021–2024	IC Croix	65	(16)
2024–	Wasquehal	8	(1)
- * Club domestic league appearances and goals as of 7 December 2024

Messaoud Bouardja (born 6 July 1991) is a French professional footballer who plays for Championnat National 1 club Wasquehal as an attacking midfielder. Between 2016 and 2018 he played for Chamois Niortais, where he made 14 appearances in Ligue 2, the second-highest division of French football. He also previously played amateur football with IC Croix and Wasquehal. Bouardja is of Algerian descent.

== Career statistics ==
As of matches played 11 May 2018

Appearances and goals by club, season and competition
Club	Division	Season	League		Coupe de France		Coupe de la Ligue		Total	
Club	Division	Season	Apps	Goals	Apps	Goals	Apps	Goals	Apps	Goals
Wasquehal	2012–13	CFA2 Group A	14	5	0	0	0	0	14	5
Wasquehal	2013–14	CFA2 Group B	17	6	0	0	0	0	17	6
Wasquehal	2014–15	CFA2 Group D	22	10	0	0	0	0	22	10
Wasquehal	2015–16	CFA Group A	11	7	2	1	0	0	13	8
Chamois Niortais	2015–16	Ligue 2	10	1	1	0	0	0	11	1
Chamois Niortais	2016–17	Ligue 2	4	0	0	0	1	0	5	0
Wasquehal (loan)	2016–17	CFA Group B	5	0	0	0	0	0	5	0
Wasquehal (loan)	2017–18	National 3 Group I	22	5	?	?	0	0	22	5
Career total			107	34	3	1	1	0	111	35

== Honours ==
Wasquehal

- Championnat de France amateur 2 Group D winners: 2014–15
