= Abdelhakim Omrani =

French footballer (born 1991)

Personal information
- Date of birth: 18 February 1991 (age 35)
- Place of birth: Freyming-Merlebach, France
- Height: 1.88 m (6 ft 2 in)
- Position: Midfielder

Youth career
- 1997–2002: SO Merlebach
- 2002–2005: Metz
- 2005–2007: Nancy
- 2007–2009: Lens

Senior career*
Years	Team	Apps	(Gls)
2009–2012	Lens	4	(0)
2013	Le Mans	13	(1)
2013–2015	Nîmes	28	(4)
2015–2016	Chamois Niortais	18	(0)
2016–2017	Sedan	10	(1)
2017–2018	Oldham Athletic	8	(0)
2018	Virton		
2019	Dunărea Călărași	1	(0)
2020–2023	RFCU Luxembourg	44	(0)
Total		126	(6)

International career
2010	France U19	1	(0)
- * Club domestic league appearances and goals as of 02:11, 2 March 2025 (UTC)

Abdelhakim Omrani (born 18 February 1991) is a French professional footballer who most recently played as an attacking midfielder for RFCU Luxembourg.

== Club career ==
Omrani began his career playing for Metz. He later left the club for Nancy, where he spent six years before heading north to RC Lens. Omrani received his first call up to the senior squad for the team's match against Angers on 6 March 2009. He made his professional debut in that match appearing as a substitute in the 72nd minute. The match finished 2–2 with Lens scoring their goals in the 88th minute and the 92nd minute. The following week, Omrani made another substitute appearance in a 1–0 defeat to Ajaccio. In August 2011, Omrani went on trial to German club Bayern Munich. However, despite impressing, the two clubs could not agree to terms and Omrani remained at Lens. In December 2012, Omrani went on trial with Newcastle United. However, he failed to impress manager Alan Pardew and returned to Lens. On 14 February 2012, Lens announced that Omrani had left the club.

In November 2013, Omrani signed a two-year contract with Nîmes Olympique, after Le Mans suffered relegation to the lower divisions for financial reasons.

On 5 September 2017, Omrani signed a one-year contract, with an option for a further year, with League One side Oldham Athletic. He was released by Oldham at the end of the 2017–18 season, following their relegation. He went on to the Belgian amateur level and R.E. Virton.

In January 2020, Omrani moved to Racing FC Union Luxembourg after six months without a club.

== International career ==
After previously representing France at the under-19 level, Omrani switched his allegiance to Algeria in September 2011 after being called up to the Algerian under-23 national team by coach Azzedine Aït Djoudi for a four-day training camp in Sidi Moussa. He was convinced to make the switch by Algerian international Antar Yahia.

== Personal life ==
Omrani was born in Freyming-Merlebach in the Moselle department to Algerian parents. He holds both French and Algerian nationalities. He comes from an athletic family which consists of six children. The eldest, Yasmina, is a professional heptathlete. Omrani also has two younger brothers who play football: Billel played for CFR Cluj and is a French youth international while Nabil has played in the youth system of a local club in Marseille.

== Career statistics ==
As of match played 16 September 2017

Appearances and goals by club, season and competition
Club	Season	League			National cup		League cup		Other		Total	
Club	Season	Division	Apps	Goals	Apps	Goals	Apps	Goals	Apps	Goals	Apps	Goals
Lens	2008–09	Ligue 2	2	0	0	0	0	0	0	0	2	0
Lens	2010–11	Ligue 1	2	0	0	0	0	0	0	0	2	0
Lens	Total		4	0	0	0	0	0	0	0	4	0
Le Mans	2012–13	Ligue 2	13	1	0	0	0	0	0	0	13	1
Nîmes	2013–14	Ligue 2	21	3	1	0	0	0	0	0	22	3
Nîmes	2014–15	Ligue 2	7	1	1	1	0	0	0	0	8	2
Nîmes	Total		28	4	2	1	0	0	0	0	30	5
Chamois Niortais	2015–16	Ligue 2	18	0	0	0	1	1	0	0	19	1
Sedan	2016–17	National	10	1	2	0	0	0	0	0	12	1
Oldham Athletic	2017–18	League One	0	0	0	0	0	0	0	0	0	0
Career total			73	6	4	1	1	1	0	0	78	8
