= Cyriaque Rivieyran =

French footballer (born 1991)

Personal information
- Full name: Cyriaque Rivieyran
- Date of birth: 17 April 1991 (age 35)
- Place of birth: Strasbourg, France
- Height: 1.72 m (5 ft 8 in)
- Position: Defensive midfielder

Youth career
- 1997–2000: Schneckenbusch-Buhl Lorraine
- 2000–2001: Duttlenheim
- 2001–2011: Strasbourg

Senior career*
Years	Team	Apps	(Gls)
2010–2011	Strasbourg	4	(0)
2012–2013	Auxerre	24	(0)
2013–2015	Gazélec Ajaccio	55	(1)
2015–2017	Clermont Foot	54	(0)
2017–2019	Chamois Niortais	30	(0)

International career
2006	France U16	3	(1)
2009	France U19	1	(0)
- * Club domestic league appearances and goals

Cyriaque Rivieyran (born 17 April 1991) is a retired French professional footballer who played as a defensive midfielder. Rivieyran is a France youth international having represented his nation at under-16 and under-19 level.

== Career ==
Born in Strasbourg, Rivieyran joined RC Strasbourg in 2001 after spending four years playing with clubs in the Alsace region. While playing in Strasbourg's youth academy, he won two Coupe d'Alsace titles in 2008 and 2010. He was rewarded with a spot on the club's senior team at the start of the 2010–11 season and made his club debut on 20 August 2010 in a league match against Guingamp appearing as a substitute in a 0–0 draw. Rivieyran made his first career start in a 12 March 2011 in a 2–0 win over Plabennec.

Rivieyran moved on a free transfer at the end of the 2014–15 season from newly promoted Gazélec Ajaccio to Clermont Foot.

On 28 October 2019, 28-year old Rivieyran announced that he had retired from football.

== Career statistics ==
As of matches played 20 September 2019.

Club	Division	Season	League		Cup (Note: Includes Coupe de France, Coupe de la Ligue, Trophée des Champions)		Europe (Note: Includes UEFA Supercup)		Total	
Club	Division	Season	Apps	Goals	Apps	Goals	Apps	Goals	Apps	Goals
Strasbourg	National	2010–11	4	0	1	0	0	0	5	0
Auxerre	Ligue 1	2011–12	4	0	0	0	0	0	4	0
Auxerre	Ligue 2	2012–13	20	0	5	0	0	0	25	0
Auxerre	Total		24	0	5	0	0	0	29	0
Gazélec Ajaccio	National	2013–14	30	0	2	0	0	0	32	0
Gazélec Ajaccio	Ligue 2	2014–15	25	1	3	0	0	0	28	1
Gazélec Ajaccio	Total		55	1	5	0	0	0	60	1
Clermont Foot	Ligue 2	2015–16	26	0	1	0	0	0	27	0
Clermont Foot	Ligue 2	2016–17	28	0	2	0	0	0	30	0
Clermont Foot	Total		54	0	3	0	0	0	57	0
Chamois Niortais	Ligue 2	2017–18	12	0	2	0	0	0	14	0
Chamois Niortais	Ligue 2	2018–19	18	0	2	0	0	0	20	0
Chamois Niortais	Total		30	0	4	0	0	0	34	0
Career total			167	1	18	0	0	0	185	1
