= Rémy Bonne =

French footballer (born 1989)

Personal information
- Date of birth: 26 January 1989 (age 37)
- Place of birth: Nîmes, France
- Height: 1.85 m (6 ft 1 in)
- Position: Left-back

Team information
- Current team: ES Uzès Pont du Gard

Senior career*
Years	Team	Apps	(Gls)
2010–2012	Uzès Pont du Gard	64	(2)
2012–2014	Lens	116	(5)
2014–2015	Arles-Avignon	18	(0)
2016–2017	Aviron Bayonnais	19	(2)
2017–	Luzenac AP	8	(0)
2020-	Uzès Pont Du Gard		
- * Club domestic league appearances and goals as of 8 November 2017

Rémy Bonne (born 26 January 1989) is a French professional footballer who plays as a defender for Luzenac AP.

== Club career ==
After two years in the amateur level, Bonne made his professional debut in July 2012 after joining Lens, in a 2–2 Ligue 2 draw against Le Mans.
