= Yann Kerboriou =

French footballer (born 1988)

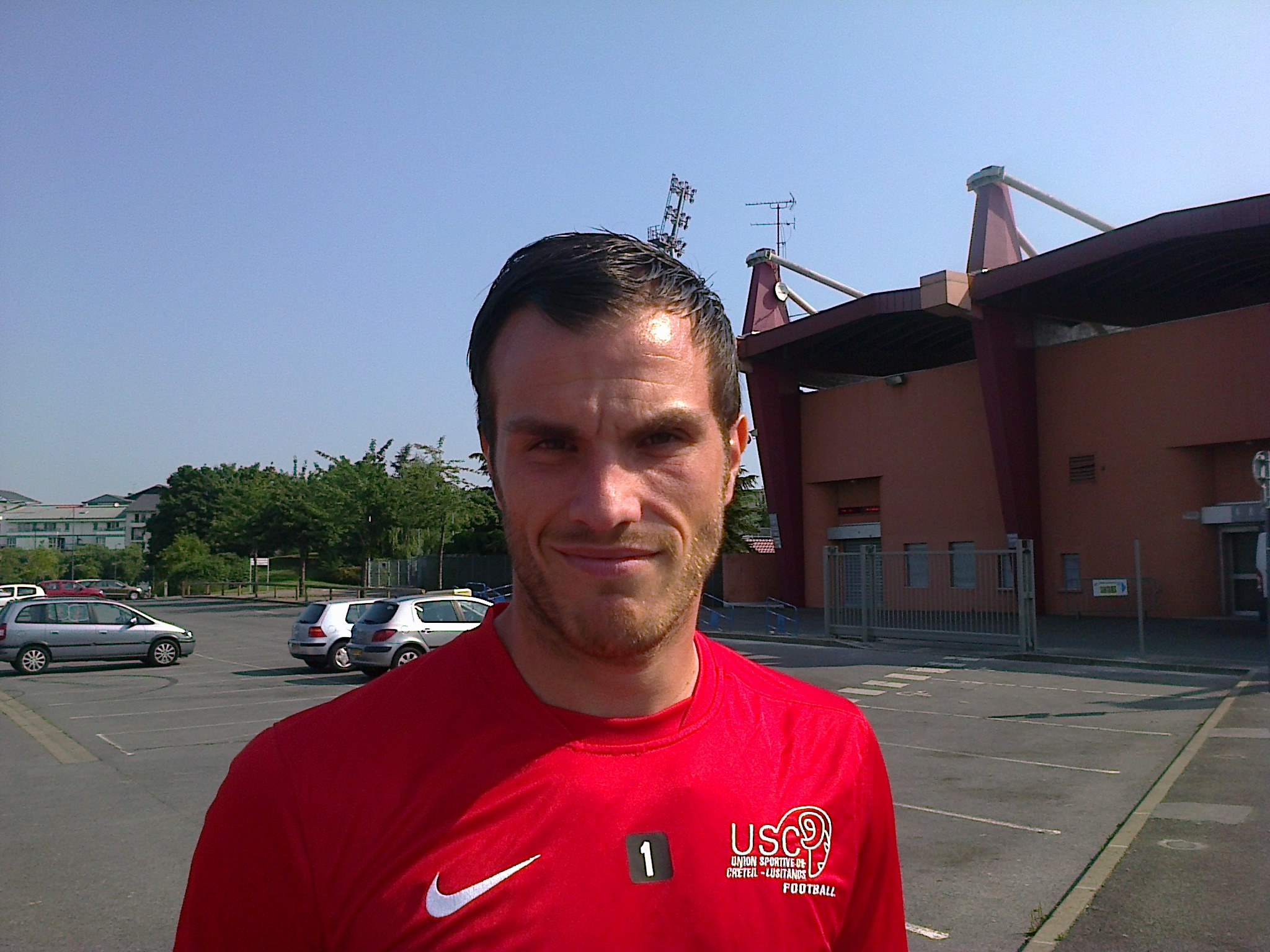

Personal information
- Full name: Yann Kerboriou
- Date of birth: 5 February 1988 (age 38)
- Place of birth: Clamart, France
- Height: 1.89 m (6 ft 2 in)
- Position: Goalkeeper

Team information
- Current team: Aubervilliers
- Number: 1

Youth career
- Lille OSC

Senior career*
| Years | Team | Apps | (Gls) |
| 2009–2010 | Aubervilliers | | |
| 2010–2018 | US Créteil | 192 | (0) |
| 2018–2019 | Fleury 91 | 14 | (0) |
| 2019– | Aubervilliers | 7 | (0) |
- * Club domestic league appearances and goals as of 23:20, 28 October 2019 (UTC)

Yann Kerboriou (born 5 February 1988) is a French footballer who plays for FCM Aubervilliers.
