= Kévin Rocheteau =

French footballer (born 1993)

Personal information
- Date of birth: 10 July 1993 (age 33)
- Place of birth: Royan, France
- Height: 1.79 m (5 ft 10 in)
- Position: Attacking midfielder

Team information
- Current team: Pays de Cassel

Youth career
- 2009–2013: Niort

Senior career*
Years	Team	Apps	(Gls)
2013–2018	Niort	53	(6)
2017–2018	→ Les Herbiers (loan)	27	(7)
2018–2020	Cholet	48	(25)
2020–2022	Dunkerque	27	(5)
2022–2023	Niort	18	(1)
2023–	Pays de Cassel	21	(4)
- * Club domestic league appearances and goals as of 00:11, 24 February 2025 (UTC)

Kévin Rocheteau (born 10 July 1993) is a French professional footballer who plays as an attacking midfielder for Championnat National 3 club Pays de Cassel.

== Career ==
Born in Royan, Rocheteau joined the youth team at Niort in 2009 and later played for the reserve side in the Division d'Honneur before turning professional in 2013. He was awarded his first professional contract at Chamois Niortais in the summer of 2013 after progressing through the club's youth teams. He made his senior début on 2 August 2013, scoring the Niort goal in a 1–1 draw with Troyes, seven minutes after coming on as a substitute for Jimmy Roye. Rocheteau was handed his first start four days later in the Coupe de la Ligue tie against Le Havre at the Stade René Gaillard. Despite goals from Rocheteau and débutant Florian Martin, Niort were beaten 2–3. On 9 August 2013 he scored his third goal in three matches, netting a late equaliser after again coming on as a substitute in the 1–1 draw away at Tours.

On 23 May 2022, Rocheteau agreed to return to Niort on a two-year contract.

== Career statistics ==
As of match played 24 May 2020.

Appearances and goals by club, season and competition
Club	Season	League			Coupe de France		Coupe de la Ligue		Total	
Club	Season	Division	Apps	Goals	Apps	Goals	Apps	Goals	Apps	Goals
Chamois Niortais	2013–14	Ligue 2	12	3	1	0	1	1	14	4
Chamois Niortais	2014–15	Ligue 2	9	0	2	0	0	0	11	0
Chamois Niortais	2015–16	Ligue 2	23	2	3	1	1	0	27	3
Chamois Niortais	2016–17	Ligue 2	9	1	1	0	0	0	10	1
Chamois Niortais	Total		53	6	7	1	2	1	62	8
Les Herbiers (loan)	2017–18	National	27	7	8	3	0	0	35	10
Cholet	2018–19	National	31	15	1	0	0	0	32	15
Cholet	2019–20	National	17	10	0	0	0	0	17	10
Cholet	Total		48	25	1	0	0	0	49	25
Career total			128	38	16	4	2	1	146	43

== Honours ==
Les Herbiers

- Coupe de France runner-up: 2017–18
