= Danilson Da Cruz =

Cape Verdean footballer (born 1986)

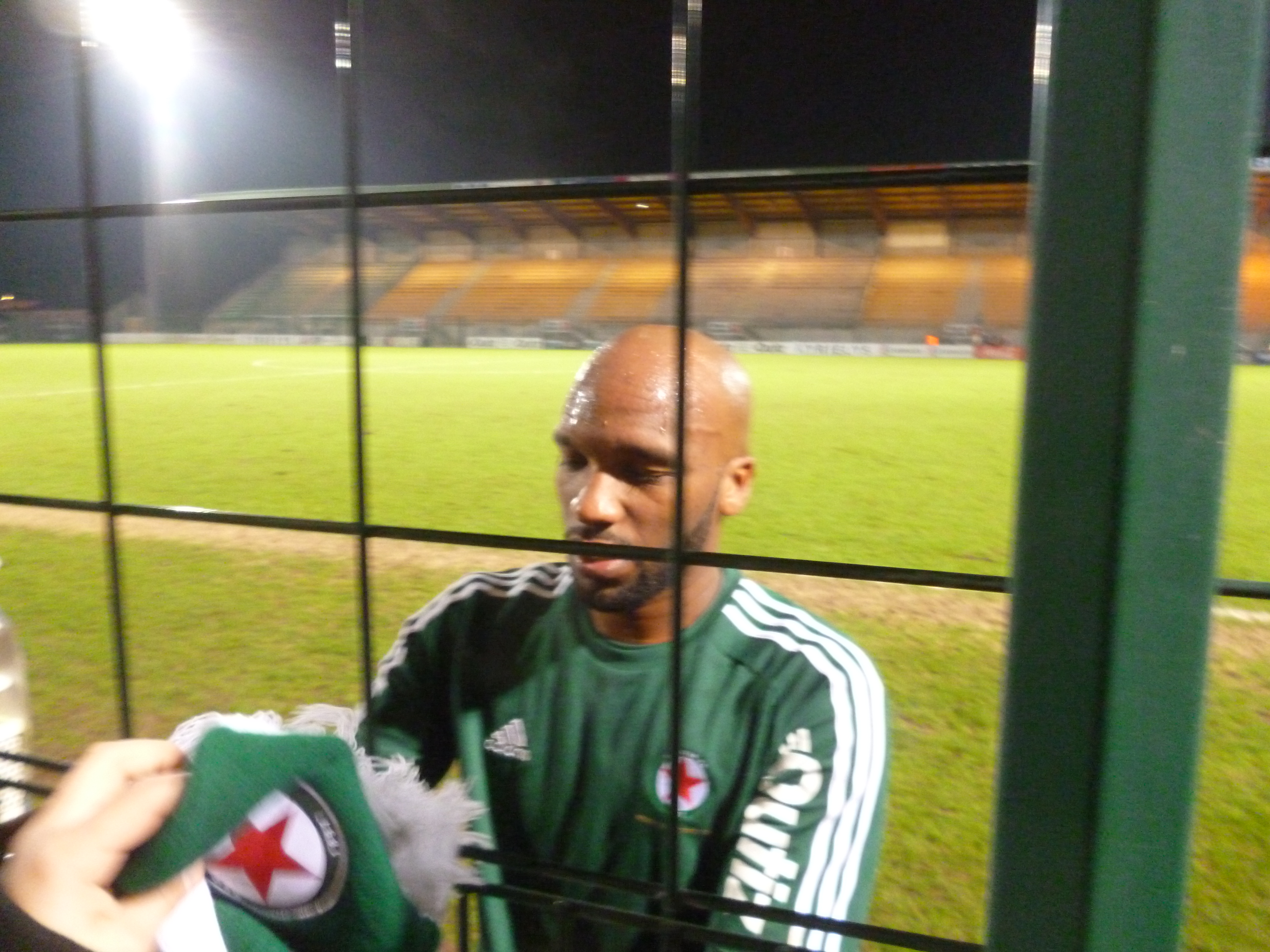
- Da Cruz with Red Star in 2016

Personal information
- Full name: Danilson Da Cruz Gomes
- Date of birth: 28 June 1986 (age 40)
- Place of birth: Créteil, France
- Height: 1.88 m (6 ft 2 in)
- Position: Defensive midfielder

Senior career*
| Years | Team | Apps | (Gls) |
| 2009–2014 | Créteil | 96 | (7) |
| 2014–2016 | Red Star | 64 | (3) |
| 2016–2018 | Reims | 64 | (4) |
| 2017 | Reims B | 2 | (0) |
| 2018–2019 | Nancy | 10 | (0) |
| 2019 | Nancy B | 3 | (0) |
| 2019–2020 | Concarneau | 13 | (0) |
| Total | | 252 | (14) |

International career
| 2017 | Cape Verde | 3 | (0) |
- * Club domestic league appearances and goals

Danilson Da Cruz Gomes (born 28 June 1986) is a former professional footballer who played as a defensive midfielder. Born in France, he played for the Cape Verde national team internationally. He also holds French citizenship.

== Club career ==
Da Cruz helped Stade de Reims win the 2017–18 Ligue 2, helping promote them to the Ligue 1 for the 2018–19 season.

On 10 September 2019, Da Cruz joined Championnat National side US Concarneau.

== International career ==
Da Cruz received his first call-up to the Cape Verde national team in August 2017. He debuted for Cape Verde in a 2–1 2018 FIFA World Cup qualification victory over South Africa on 1 September 2017.

== Honours ==
Reims

- Ligue 2: 2017–18
