= Raphaël Cacérès =

French footballer (born 1987)

Personal information
- Date of birth: 1 September 1987 (age 39)
- Place of birth: Carpentras, France
- Height: 1.87 m (6 ft 2 in)
- Position: Striker

Senior career*
Years	Team	Apps	(Gls)
2005–2006	ES Pernoise	?	(?)
2006–2008	Rouen	40	(3)
2008–2009	Montluçon	32	(11)
2009–2010	Luzenac	38	(11)
2010–2013	Dijon	49	(11)
2011–2012	→ Troyes (loan)	30	(10)
2013	Arles-Avignon	20	(7)
2013–2014	Zulte Waregem	34	(5)
2014–2016	Sochaux	41	(6)
2016–2018	Troyes	17	(1)
Total		301	(65)
- * Club domestic league appearances and goals

Raphaël Cacérès (born 1 September 1987) is a French former professional footballer who played as a striker.

In March 2019, at the age of 31, Cacéres announced his retirement from professional football due to an injury to his big toe.
