= Seydou Koné (footballer, born 1983) =

Ivorian footballer (born 1983)

Personal information
- Date of birth: 28 February 1983 (age 43)
- Place of birth: Marcory, Ivory Coast
- Height: 1.79 m (5 ft 10 in)
- Position: Striker

Youth career
- Omness De Dabou
- Stade d'Abidjan

Senior career*
Years	Team	Apps	(Gls)
2002–2007	RC Kadiogo		
2007–2009	Botoșani		
2008–2009	→ Internațional Curtea de Argeș (loan)		
2009–2010	União Leiria	1	(0)
2010–2011	Pau	29	(22)
2011–2013	Nîmes	55	(27)
2013–2014	Uzès Pont du Gard	14	(6)
2014	Istres	10	(2)
2014–2016	Chamois Niortais	64	(18)
2016–2017	Laval	11	(0)
2017	→ CA Bastia (loan)	7	(0)
2018	SC Manduel		
2018–2022	Le Grau-du-Roi		
- * Club domestic league appearances and goals

Seydou Koné (born 28 February 1983) is an Ivorian former professional footballer who played as a striker.

== Career ==
Born in Marcory, Ivory Coast, Koné played youth football in his native country before starting his senior career in Burkina Faso with Racing Club Kadiogo, where he spent five seasons. After spells in Romania with Botoșani and Internațional Curtea, he moved to Portugal in 2009 to join União Leiria. Koné made just one appearance for the club before transferring to French side Pau FC the following summer. He signed a two-year contract with Nîmes in 2011 after spending one season with Pau and leading the Championnat de France amateur in goals.

Koné spent two years with Nîmes before transferring to Uzès Pont du Gard ahead of the 2013–14 season, and six months later he was on the move again, joining Istres.

== Career statistics ==
Appearances and goals by club, season and competition
Club	Season	League			National cup		League cup		Total	
Club	Season	Division	Apps	Goals	Apps	Goals	Apps	Goals	Apps	Goals
União de Leiria	2009–10	Primeira Liga	1	0	0	0	1	0	2	0
Pau	2010–11	CFA	29	22	1	0	—		30	22
Nîmes	2011–12	National	30	21	1	1	1	0	32	22
Nîmes	2012–13	Ligue 2	25	6	2	4	0	0	27	10
Nîmes	Total		55	27	3	5	1	0	59	32
Uzès Pont du Gard	2013–14	National	14	6	0	0	—		14	6
Istres	2013–14	Ligue 2	10	2	0	0	0	0	10	2
Niort	2014–15	Ligue 2	35	15	2	0	1	2	38	17
Niort	2015–16	Ligue 2	29	3	4	3	1	1	34	7
Niort	Total		64	18	6	3	2	3	72	24
Laval	2016–17	Ligue 2	11	0	3	0	2	1	16	1
Laval B	2016–17	CFA 2	1	0	—		—		1	0
CA Bastia (loan)	2016–17	Ligue 2	7	0	0	0	0	0	8	0
Career total			192	75	13	8	6	4	211	87

== Honours ==
Nîmes

- Championnat National: 2011–12
