= Hassane Alla =

Moroccan footballer (born 1980)

Personal information
- Full name: Hassane Alla
- Date of birth: 24 November 1980 (age 45)
- Place of birth: Oujda, Morocco
- Height: 1.81 m (5 ft 11 in)
- Position: Midfielder

Senior career*
Years	Team	Apps	(Gls)
2005–2006	MC Oujda		
2006–2012	Le Havre	130	(9)
2013–2017	Laval	142	(18)
2017–2018	US Boulogne	29	(0)

International career
2004–2006	Morocco	6	(0)
- * Club domestic league appearances and goals as of 13:04, 3 February 2021 (UTC)

Hassane Alla (born 24 November 1980) is a Moroccan footballer who most recently played as a midfielder for French side US Boulogne.

Alla has represented the Morocco national football team 6 times. He also played for the local team, MC Oujda. He then played for Le Havre and Laval until 2017.
