= Mouhamadou Diaw =

Senegalese footballer (born 1981)

Personal information
- Date of birth: 2 February 1981 (age 45)
- Place of birth: Yoff, Senegal
- Height: 1.68 m (5 ft 6 in)
- Position: Midfielder

Senior career*
Years	Team	Apps	(Gls)
1998–1999	ASC Jeanne d'Arc		
1999–2000	Draguignan	13	(1)
2000–2003	ASC Jeanne d'Arc		
2003–2006	Amiens	58	(2)
2006–2008	Clermont	33	(0)
2008–2009	La Vitréenne	23	(8)
2009–2015	Chamois Niortais	182	(22)
2015–2016	Auxerre	21	(1)
2016–2018	Fréjus Saint-Raphaël	40	(8)
2018–2019	AS Excelsior	23	(7)

International career
2003	Senegal	1	(0)
- * Club domestic league appearances and goals

Mouhamadou Diaw (born 2 February 1981) is a Senegalese former professional footballer who played as a midfielder.

== Career ==
Diaw signed with Niort from La Vitréenne on 10 July 2009. He joined Auxerre in the summer of 2015.
