= Andé Dona Ndoh =

Cameroonian footballer

Personal information
- Full name: Andé Dona Ndoh
- Date of birth: 22 May 1986 (age 40)
- Place of birth: Meanja, Cameroon
- Height: 1.84 m (6 ft 0 in)
- Position: Striker

Youth career
- 2004–2005: Unisport de Bafang
- 2005–2007: Le Havre

Senior career*
Years	Team	Apps	(Gls)
2007–2010	Le Havre	2	(0)
2008–2009	→ Luzenac (loan)	30	(14)
2010–2012	Rouen	58	(21)
2012–2014	Luzenac	55	(27)
2014–2019	Chamois Niortais	172	(61)
2019–2021	Nancy	21	(1)

International career
2007–2008	Cameroon U23	4	(0)

Managerial career
- 2022: Chamois Niortais
- * Club domestic league appearances and goals

Andé Dona Ndoh (born 22 May 1986) is a Cameroonian football coach and former professional player. who is assistant coach for Ligue 2 club Niort During his career, he played as a striker for various French clubs, including Le Havre, Rouen, Luzenac, Chamois Niortais and Nancy.

== Career ==
Ndoh began his career with Unisport de Bafang before moving to Le Havre in the summer of 2005. After spending two years in the reserve team, he had his first taste of professional football on 10 August 2007 when he came on as a substitute in the 3–1 defeat to Libourne. He then moved on loan to US Luzenac during the 2008–09 season, where he scored 14 goals in 30 league appearances. Ndoh made one further appearance for Le Havre before leaving the club in the summer of 2010 to join Championnat National side FC Rouen. He spent two years with Rouen, scoring 21 goals in 59 league matches during that time. In June 2012 he returned to Luzenac, this time on a permanent basis, along with Rouen teammate Jérôme Hergault. During the 2013–14 season, Ndoh scored 22 league goals, the highest total in the Championnat National. He was also selected as player of the season by the managers in that division. In total, he played 55 league games for Luzenac during a two-year spell, scoring 27 times.

On 11 June 2014, it was announced that Ndoh had signed a three-year contract with Ligue 2 outfit Chamois Niortais. He remained with Niort until 2019, becoming the club's all-time leading goalscorer with 61 goals in 172 league appearances. After a two-year spell with Nancy at the end of his playing career, Ndoh returned to Niort as an attacking coach under head coach Sébastien Desabre in August 2021.

== Career statistics ==
As of matches played 17 May 2019

Appearances and goals by club, season and competition
Club	Season	League			Coupe de France		Coupe de la Ligue		Total	
Club	Season	Division	Apps	Goals	Apps	Goals	Apps	Goals	Apps	Goals
Le Havre	2007–08	Ligue 2	1	0	0	0	0	0	1	0
Le Havre	2009–10	Ligue 2	1	0	0	0	0	0	1	0
Le Havre	Total		2	0	0	0	0	0	2	0
Luzenac (loan)	2008–09	CFA Group C	30	14	4	4	0	0	34	18
Rouen	2010–11	National	35	13	4	0	0	0	39	13
Rouen	2011–12	National	23	8	0	0	0	0	23	8
Rouen	Total		58	21	4	0	0	0	62	21
Luzenac	2012–13	National	24	5	2	1	0	0	26	6
Luzenac	2013–14	National	31	22	0	0	0	0	31	22
Luzenac	Total		55	27	2	1	0	0	57	28
Chamois Niortais	2014–15	Ligue 2	34	6	3	0	0	0	37	6
Chamois Niortais	2015–16	Ligue 2	36	13	2	1	1	0	39	14
Chamois Niortais	2016–17	Ligue 2	32	14	3	1	1	0	36	15
Chamois Niortais	2017–18	Ligue 2	38	15	3	1	1	0	42	16
Chamois Niortais	2018–19	Ligue 2	32	13	3	1	1	0	36	14
Chamois Niortais	Total		172	61	14	4	4	0	190	65
Nancy	2019–20	Ligue 2	21	1	4	2	2	0	27	3
Career total			338	124	28	11	6	0	372	135
