= Grégory Berthier =

French footballer (born 1995)

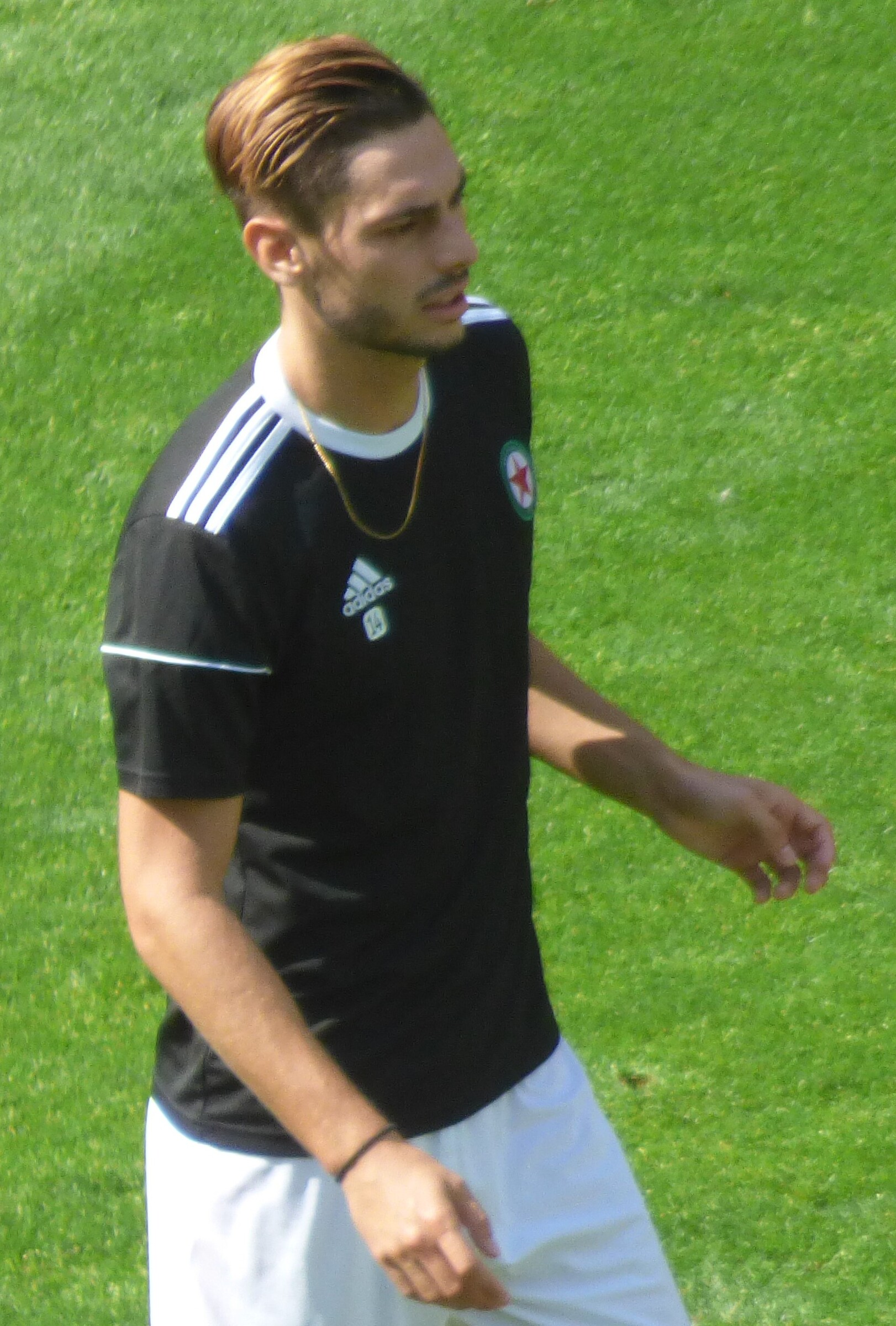
- Berthier in 2018

Personal information
- Date of birth: 11 November 1995 (age 31)
- Place of birth: Sens, France
- Height: 1.77 m (5 ft 10 in)
- Position: Winger

Team information
- Current team: Orléans
- Number: 11

Youth career
- 2001–2006: SC De Gron
- 2006–2014: Auxerre

Senior career*
Years	Team	Apps	(Gls)
2013–2016	Auxerre II	26	(5)
2014–2016	Auxerre	38	(6)
2016–2020	Reims II	10	(2)
2016–2020	Reims	37	(0)
2018–2019	→ Red Star (loan)	21	(1)
2020–2021	Vendsyssel	25	(3)
2021–2022	Chambly	32	(8)
2022–	Orléans	99	(8)
- * Club domestic league appearances and goals as of 23 June 2026

Grégory Berthier (born 11 November 1995) is a French professional footballer who plays as a winger for Ligue 3 club Orléans.

== Career ==
Berthier made his professional debut with AJ Auxerre in August 2014, in a 1–0 Ligue 2 defeat against Dijon.

In June 2015, it was announced Berthier would join Stade de Reims for the 2015–16 having signed a four-year contract. He helped Stade de Reims win the 2017–18 Ligue 2, helping promote them to the Ligue 1 for the 2018–19 season.

On 6 October 2020, it was confirmed, that Berthier had joined Danish 1st Division club Vendsyssel FF. On 1 July 2021, Berthier returned to France, signing with Chambly.

In June 2022, Berthier signed with Orléans.

== Honours ==
Reims

- Ligue 2: 2017–18
