= Tristan Lahaye =

French footballer (born 1983)

Personal information
- Full name: Tristan Lahaye
- Date of birth: 16 February 1983 (age 43)
- Place of birth: Juvisy-sur-Orge, France
- Height: 1.80 m (5 ft 11 in)
- Position: Right back

Senior career*
Years	Team	Apps	(Gls)
2000–2004	Beauvais	58	(0)
2004	Bois-Guillaume	5	(0)
2004–2005	Romorantin	18	(0)
2005–2006	Sète	26	(1)
2006–2008	Amiens	44	(0)
2008–2009	Kortrijk	18	(0)
2009–2011	Châteauroux	46	(1)
2012	Grenoble	13	(0)
2012–2017	Chamois Niortais	112	(0)
- * Club domestic league appearances and goals as of 14:33, 3 June 2017 (UTC)

Tristan Lahaye (born 16 February 1983) is a French footballer who last played as a defender for Ligue 2 side Chamois Niortais.

Lahaye has played for AS Beauvais Oise, FC Sète, Amiens SC and LB Châteauroux in Ligue 2. He also had a spell in the Belgian Pro League with Kortrijk between 2008 and 2009.

== Career statistics ==
As of match played 19 May 2017.

Appearances and goals by club, season and competition
Club	Season	League			Cup		League Cup		Total	
Club	Season	Division	Apps	Goals	Apps	Goals	Apps	Goals	Apps	Goals
Beauvais	2002–03	Ligue 2	28	0	1	0	3	0	32	0
Beauvais	2003–04	National	30	0	1	0	0	0	31	0
Bois-Guillaume	2004–05	CFA Group A	5	0	0	0	0	0	5	0
Romorantin	2004–05	National	18	0	1	0	0	0	19	0
Sète	2005–06	Ligue 2	26	1	1	0	1	0	28	1
Amiens	2006–07	Ligue 2	19	0	2	0	1	0	22	0
Amiens	2007–08	Ligue 2	25	0	4	0	3	0	32	0
Kortrijk	2008–09	Pro League	17	0	2	0	0	0	19	0
Kortrijk	2009–10	Pro League	1	0	0	0	0	0	1	0
Châteauroux	2009–10	Ligue 2	16	1	0	0	0	0	16	1
Châteauroux	2010–11	Ligue 2	30	0	1	0	1	0	32	0
Grenoble	2011–12	CFA2 Group E	13	0	0	0	0	0	13	0
Chamois Niortais	2012–13	Ligue 2	14	0	0	0	0	0	14	0
Chamois Niortais	2013–14	Ligue 2	30	0	4	0	0	0	34	0
Chamois Niortais	2014–15	Ligue 2	23	0	0	0	0	0	23	0
Chamois Niortais	2015–16	Ligue 2	35	0	2	0	1	0	39	0
Chamois Niortais	2016–17	Ligue 2	10	0	3	0	1	0	14	0
Career totals			338	2	22	0	11	0	371	2
