= Paul Delecroix =

French footballer (born 1988)

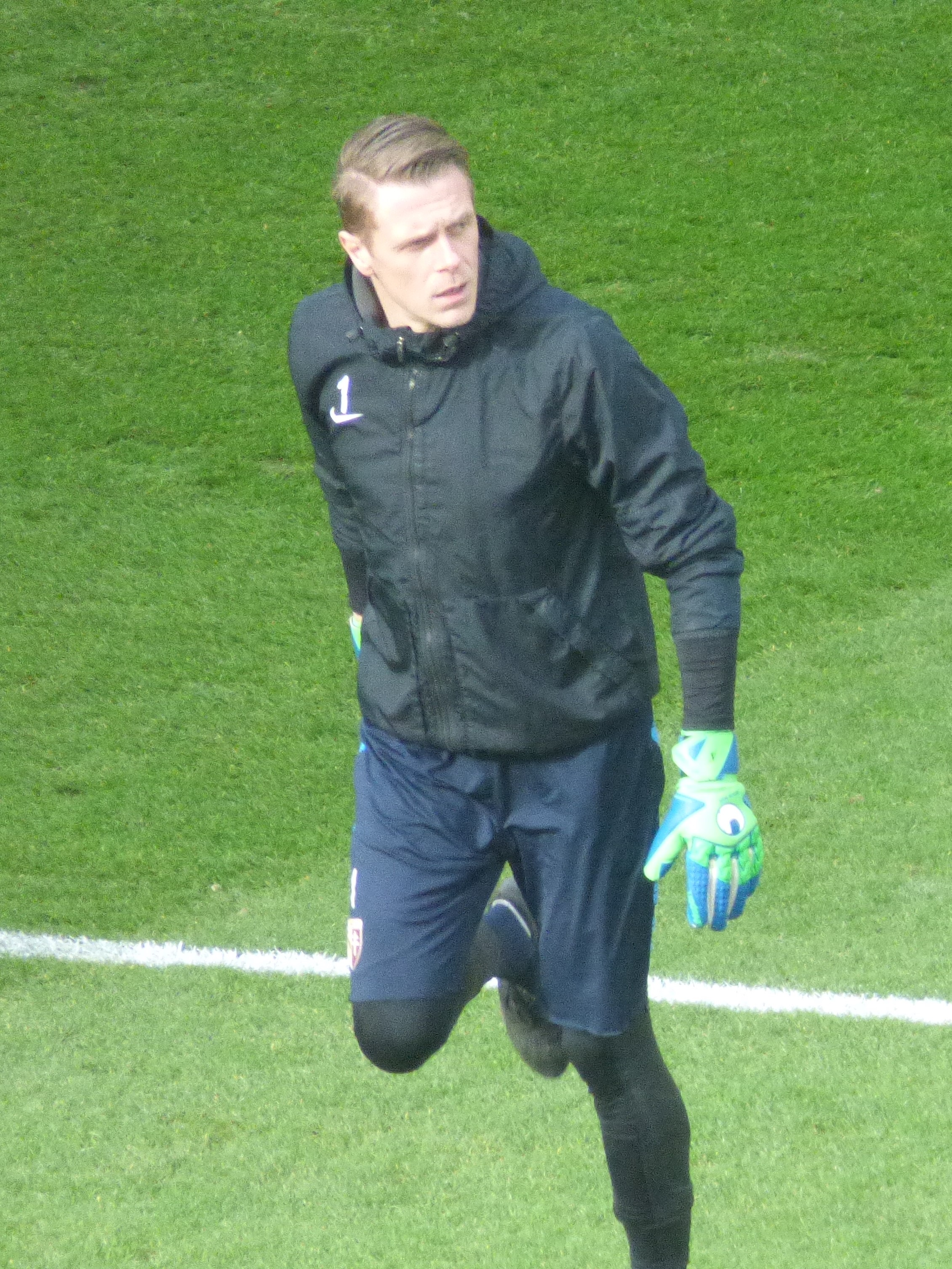
- Delecroix in 2019 with Metz

Personal information
- Date of birth: 14 October 1988 (age 38)
- Place of birth: Amiens, France
- Height: 1.83 m (6 ft 0 in)
- Position: Goalkeeper

Team information
- Current team: Dijon
- Number: 16

Senior career*
Years	Team	Apps	(Gls)
2008–2012	Amiens	6	(0)
2011–2012	→ Chamois Niortais (loan)	38	(0)
2012–2016	Chamois Niortais	117	(0)
2016	Lorient B	2	(0)
2016–2018	Lorient	9	(0)
2018–2020	Metz	3	(0)
2019–2021	Metz B	5	(0)
2021	Annecy	17	(0)
2021–2023	Châteauroux	62	(0)
2023–2024	Niort	34	(0)
2024–	Dijon	50	(0)
- * Club domestic league appearances and goals as of 22 June 2026

Paul Delecroix (born 14 October 1988) is a French professional footballer who plays as a goalkeeper for Ligue 2 club Dijon.

== Career ==
Born in Amiens, Delecroix started his career with Amiens and made six league appearances for the club. He spent the 2011–12 season with Championnat National side Niort and played in every league game as the team won promotion to Ligue 2 as runners-up in the National. He subsequently joined Niort permanently on 27 June 2012, signing a two-year contract with the newly promoted club.

In May 2016, it was announced Delecroix would join Lorient on a three-year contract.

In July 2018, Delecroix joined Metz after being freed from his Lorient contract.

In January 2021, Delecroix signed for Championnat National club Annecy.

On 30 June 2024, Delecroix signed for Championnat National club Dijon.

== Personal life ==
Paul's father Jean-Louis is a former footballer.

== Career statistics ==
As of match played 9 May 2025

Appearances and goals by club, season and competition
Club	Season	League			National cup		League cup		Total	
Club	Season	Division	Apps	Goals	Apps	Goals	Apps	Goals	Apps	Goals
Amiens	2008–09	Ligue 2	2	0	1	0	0	0	3	0
Amiens	2009–10	National	2	0	3	0	0	0	5	0
Amiens	2010–11	National	2	0	5	0	1	0	8	0
Amiens	Total		6	0	9	0	1	0	16	0
Chamois Niortais (loan)	2011–12	National	38	0	0	0	0	0	38	0
Chamois Niortais	2012–13	Ligue 2	11	0	0	0	1	0	12	0
Chamois Niortais	2013–14	Ligue 2	37	0	3	0	0	0	40	0
Chamois Niortais	2014–15	Ligue 2	36	0	1	0	0	0	37	0
Chamois Niortais	2015–16	Ligue 2	33	0	1	0	1	0	35	0
Chamois Niortais	Total		117	0	5	0	2	0	124	0
Lorient B	2016–17	CFA	2	0	—		—		2	0
Lorient	2016–17	Ligue 1	7	0	0	0	1	0	8	0
Lorient	2017–18	Ligue 2	2	0	0	0	0	0	2	0
Lorient	Total		9	0	0	0	1	0	10	0
Metz	2018–19	Ligue 2	1	0	5	0	3	0	9	0
Metz	2019–20	Ligue 1	2	0	1	0	1	0	4	0
Metz	Total		3	0	6	0	4	0	13	0
Metz B	2019–20	National 3	1	0	—		—		1	0
Metz B	2020–21	National 2	4	0	—		—		4	0
Metz B	Total		5	0	—		—		5	0
Annecy	2020–21	National	17	0	0	0	—		17	0
Châteauroux	2021–22	National	32	0	1	0	—		33	0
Châteauroux	2022–23	National	30	0	2	0	—		32	0
Châteauroux	Total		62	0	3	0	—		65	0
Niort	2023–24	National	34	0	0	0	—		34	0
Dijon	2024–25	National	26	0	0	0	—		26	0
Career total			309	0	23	0	8	0	340	0

== Honours ==
Metz

- Ligue 2: 2018–19

Metz B

- Championnat National 3: 2019–20
