= 2019–20 Championnat National =

Championnat National
- Season: 2019–20
- Champions: Not awarded
- Promoted: Pau; Dunkerque
- Relegated: Le Puy; Béziers; Gazélec Ajaccio; Toulon
- Matches: 223
- Goals: 531 (2.38 per match)
- Top goalscorer: 16 goals Achille Anani, Bourg-en-Bresse
- Biggest home win: Pau 7–0 Béziers; Round 20, 1 February 2020
- Biggest away win: Bastia-Borgo 2–6 Le Puy; Round 5, 30 August 2019; Cholet 0–4 Dunkerque; Round 17, 20 December 2019; Le Puy 2–6 Cholet; Round 24, 28 February 2020
- Highest scoring: 8 goals Bastia-Borgo 2–6 Le Puy; Round 5, 30 August 2019; Le Puy 2–6 Cholet; Round 24, 28 February 2020
- Longest winning run: 5 Dunkerque; Red Star
- Longest unbeaten run: 14; Villefranche
- Longest winless run: 22; Toulon
- Longest losing run: 5 Le Puy

The 2019–20 Championnat National season was the 27th season since the establishment of the Championnat National, and the 22nd in its current format, which serves as the third division of the French football league system. The season was suspended indefinitely on 12 March 2020 due to the COVID-19 pandemic.

On 28 April 2020, the French Prime Minister Edouard Philippe announced that there would be no sporting events, even behind closed doors, before September 2020, thus in effect ending the season. On 11 May the executive committee of the FFF announced that the top two teams (Pau FC and USL Dunkerque) would be promoted to Ligue 2, but that no promotion playoff would take place, and no champion would be declared.

== Team changes ==
Team changes from the 2018–19 Championnat National were confirmed by the FFF on 12 July.

=== To National ===
Promoted from National 2

- Créteil
- Le Puy
- Toulon
- Bastia-Borgo

Relegated from Ligue 2

- Béziers
- Red Star
- Gazélec Ajaccio

=== From National ===
Relegated to National 2

- Tours (Note: further relegated administratively to Championnat National 3.)
- Drancy
- L'Entente SSG
- Marignane Gignac

Promoted to Ligue 2

- Rodez
- Chambly
- Le Mans

=== Stadia and locations ===
Location of teams in 2019–20 National

Club	Location	Venue	Capacity
Avranches	Avranches	Stade René Fenouillère	2,000
Bastia-Borgo	Borgo	Stade Paul-Antoniotti	1,300
Béziers	Béziers	Stade de la Méditerranée	18,555
Boulogne	Boulogne-sur-Mer	Stade de la Libération	15,204
Bourg-Péronnas	Bourg-en-Bresse	Stade Marcel-Verchère	11,400
Cholet	Cholet	Stade Pierre Blouen	9,000
Concarneau	Concarneau	Stade Guy Piriou	6,500
Créteil	Créteil	Stade Dominique Duvauchelle	12,150
Dunkerque	Dunkirk	Stade Marcel-Tribut	4,200
Gazélec Ajaccio	Ajaccio	Stade Ange Casanova	8,000
Laval	Laval	Stade Francis Le Basser	18,607
Le Puy	Le Puy-en-Velay	Stade Charles Massot	4,800
Lyon-Duchère	Lyon	Stade de Balmont	5,438
Pau	Pau	Stade du Hameau	13,819
Quevilly-Rouen	Le Petit-Quevilly	Stade Robert Diochon	12,018
Red Star	Paris (Saint-Ouen)	Stade Bauer	10,000
Toulon	Toulon	Stade de Bon Rencontre	8,200
Villefranche	Villefranche-sur-Saône	Stade Armand-Chouffet	3,200

== Special rule changes ==
Due to the premature cancellation of the season before completion, special rules were put in place by the FFF Executive Committed to rank clubs, superseding the normal competition rules.

1. Points per game completed
2. Number of points gained in head-to-head matches (only where all scheduled matches between all tied teams have completed)
3. Goal difference in head-to-head matches (only where all scheduled matches between all tied teams have completed)
4. Number of away games completed, as a percentage of overall number of games completed
5. Goal difference per game completed
6. Goals scored per game completed
7. Fair play
8. Better classification, based on completion of the first set of round robin games (only if all clubs have completed at least one game against all other clubs)
9. Drawing of lots

== League table ==
Pos	Team	Pld	W	D	L	GF	GA	GD	PPG	Promotion or Relegation
1	Pau (P)	25	13	9	3	43	20	+23	1.92	Promotion to Ligue 2
2	Dunkerque (P)	25	14	5	6	42	26	+16	1.88	Promotion to Ligue 2
3	Boulogne (Note: Originally, the 3rd-placed Championnat National team would play in promotion-relegation play-offs at the end of the season with a team from Ligue 2 to decide whether they would be promoted to Ligue 2 for the 2020–21 season, but the play-offs were cancelled and the 3rd-placed team remained in the Championnat National.)	25	14	4	7	32	17	+15	1.84	
4	Avranches	24	13	3	8	30	26	+4	1.75	
5	Red Star	25	12	6	7	30	22	+8	1.68 (Note: Red Star and Bourg-Péronnas completed both their head-to-head games (Bourg-Péronnas 1–4 Red Star, Red Star 1–1 Bourg-Péronnas). Criteria 2 (Number of points gained in head-to-head matches (only where all scheduled matches between all tied teams have completed)) applies: Red Star 4, Bourg-Péronnas 1.)	
6	Bourg-Péronnas	25	11	9	5	38	30	+8	1.68	
7	Villefranche	25	10	11	4	34	24	+10	1.64	
8	Lyon-Duchère	25	11	7	7	37	32	+5	1.60	
9	Créteil	25	9	8	8	33	27	+6	1.40 (Note: Créteil and Laval did not complete both their head-to-head games. Both completed 12 of 17 away games. Criteria 5 (Goal difference per game completed) applies: Créteil 0.24, Laval 0.08.)	
10	Laval	25	9	8	8	26	24	+2	1.40	
11	Concarneau	25	8	7	10	21	25	−4	1.24	
12	Cholet	25	7	7	11	32	40	−8	1.12	
13	Bastia-Borgo	23	5	9	9	22	32	−10	1.04	
14	Quevilly-Rouen	24	6	6	12	26	34	−8	1.00	
15	Le Puy (R)	25	6	5	14	27	40	−13	0.92 (Note: Le Puy and Béziers did not complete both their head-to-head games. Both completed 13 of 17 away games. Criteria 5 (Goal difference per game completed) applies: Le Puy -0.52, Béziers -0.68.)	Relegation to Championnat National 2
16	Béziers (R)	25	5	8	12	26	43	−17	0.92	Relegation to Championnat National 2
17	Gazélec Ajaccio (Note: On 2 August 2019, Gazélec Ajaccio refused to play their first game of the season at Red Star in protest at decisions taken by the DNCG. On 7 August 2019, the FFF confirmed the forfeit, awarding a 3–0 victory to Red Star and deducting a penalty point from Gazélec Ajaccio.) (R)	25	4	8	13	15	35	−20	0.76	Relegation to Championnat National 2
18	Toulon (R)	25	1	10	14	17	34	−17	0.52	Relegation to Championnat National 2

Source: FFF.fr
Rules for classification: see Special rule changes section
(P) Promoted; (R) Relegated

== Top scorers ==
As of end of season.

Rank	Player	Club	Goals
1	(Ivory Coast) Achille Anani	Bourg-en-Bresse	16
2	(Senegal) Mamadou Gueye	Pau	14
3	(France) Jonathan Rivas	Lyon-Duchère	13
4	(France) Mohamed Bayo	Dunkerque	12
5	(France) Mehdi Chahiri	Red Star	11
5	(France) Guillaume Bosca	Dunkerque	11
5	(France) Gaëtan Laura	Quevilly-Rouen	11
8	(Senegal) Cheikh Sabaly	Pau	10
8	(France) Kévin Rocheteau	Cholet	10
8	(France) Kevin Testud	Béziers	10
