= Stade René Gaillard =

Multi-purpose stadium in Niort, France

Coordinates: 46°19′02″N 0°29′23″W

Stade René-Gaillard
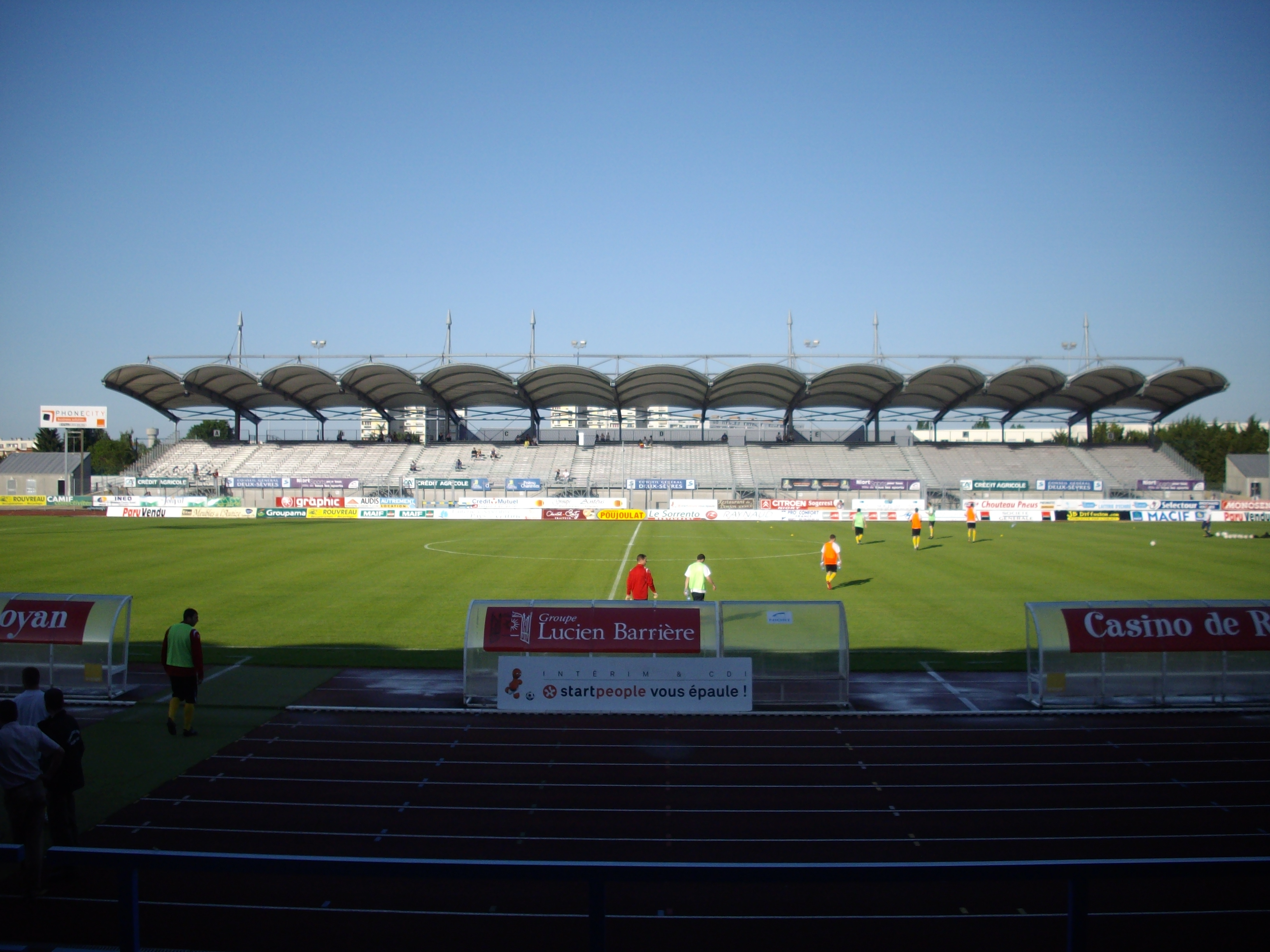
- Interactive map of Stade René-Gaillard
- Full name: Stade Municipal René Gaillard
- Former names: Stade de la Venise Verte
- Address: 105 Avenue de la Venise Verte
- Location: 79000 Niort, Nouvelle-Aquitaine, France
- Capacity: 10,886
- Surface: Grass
- Scoreboard: No
- Record attendance: 16,715 (Niort vs Marseille, 1987–88 season)
- Field size: 105m x 68m

Construction
- Built: 1973–1974
- Opened: 3 August 1974

Tenants
- Chamois Niortais FC (1974–2025); Chamois Niortais Saint-Flo (2025–present)

The Stade René-Gaillard (French pronunciation: [stad ʁəne ɡajaʁ]) is a multi-purpose stadium in Niort, France. It was the home of football club Chamois Niortais FC from 1974 until the club was dissolved in 2025.

The stadium's record attendance is 16,715, which was recorded during a game between Chamois Niortais FC and Olympique de Marseille in the 1987–88 season.
