= Florian Martin =

French footballer (born 1990)

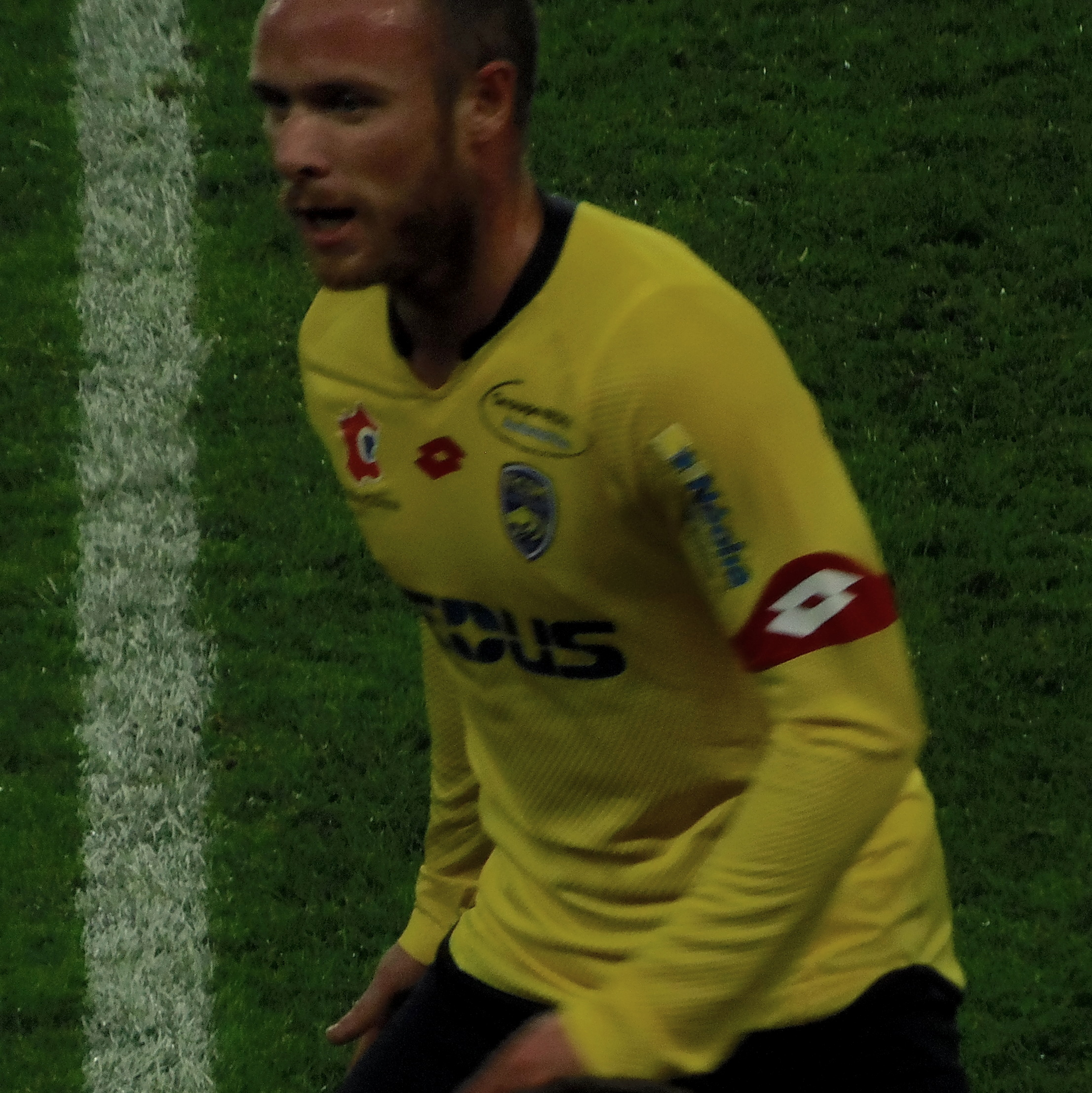
- Martin in 2015

Personal information
- Date of birth: 19 March 1990 (age 36)
- Place of birth: Lorient, France
- Height: 1.80 m (5 ft 11 in)
- Position: Attacking midfielder

Youth career
- –2010: Lorient

Senior career*
Years	Team	Apps	(Gls)
2010–2011	Lorient B	29	(7)
2011–2013	Carquefou	72	(22)
2013–2015	Chamois Niortais	66	(10)
2015–2018	Sochaux	76	(20)
2019–2021	Paris FC	41	(6)
2022–2023	Valenciennes B	2	(1)
2022–2023	Valenciennes	15	(0)
- * Club domestic league appearances and goals as of 28 June 2023

Florian Martin (born 19 March 1990) is a French professional footballer who plays as an attacking midfielder.

== Career ==
Martin started his career with Lorient, but did not break into the first team and joined Carquefou in 2011, where he spent two seasons before signing for Chamois Niortais in the summer of 2013.

On 31 January 2022, Martin signed with Valenciennes until the end of the season, with an option to extend.
