= 2012–13 Chamois Niortais F.C. season =

Chamois Niortais
2012–13 season
- President: Joël Coué
- Manager: Pascal Gastien
- Stadium: Stade René Gaillard
- Ligue 2: 15th
- Coupe de France: Eighth round
- Coupe de la Ligue: Second round
- Top goalscorer: Jimmy Roye and Jérôme Lafourcade (8)
- Highest home attendance: 8,485 (v. Nantes, 26 April 2013)
- Lowest home attendance: 2,056 (v. Boulogne, 7 August 2012)
- Average home league attendance: 4,868
Home colours	Away colours

The 2012–13 season was the 87th season in the history of the French football club Chamois Niortais. After finishing as runners-up in the Championnat National in the 2011–12 campaign, the team competed in Ligue 2, the second tier of the French football pyramid. The promotion meant a return to professional status for the club, which was lost following relegation to the Championnat de France amateur three years earlier.

Former Niort midfielder Pascal Gastien continued his second spell as manager, having been appointed to the position in the summer of 2009. The league season began on 27 July 2012 and concluded on 24 May 2013. Niort participated in the Coupe de la Ligue for the first time since 2008, reaching the second round before being eliminated by AS Monaco. The team also entered the Coupe de France in the seventh round along with all the other clubs in Ligue 2, and progressed to the next stage with a 1–0 win against Guéret.

Niort ended the campaign in 15th place in Ligue 2, securing their safety with a 2–0 win at Sedan on 10 May 2013. The highest goalscorers were striker Jérôme Lafourcade and attacking midfielder Jimmy Roye, who each scored eight times.

== Transfers ==
In

Pos	Player	From	Date	Ref
GK	Rodolphe Roche	Saint-Louis Neuweg	31 May 2012	
MF	Jimmy Juan	Chesterfield	6 June 2012	
DF	Mehdi Khalis	Drancy	6 June 2012	
GK	Pascal Elissalde	Cognac	13 June 2012	
DF	Mickaël Courtot	Besançon	14 June 2012	
FW	Jérôme Lafourcade	Châteauroux	20 June 2012	
FW	Kévin N'Zuzi Mata	Paris	22 June 2012	
GK	Paul Delecroix	Amiens	27 June 2012	
DF	Nicolas Pallois	Valenciennes	28 June 2012	
DF	Tristan Lahaye	Grenoble	9 July 2012	

Out

Pos	Player	To	Date	Ref
GK	Pascal Landais	Retired	—	
DF	Sadio Sankharé	Retired	—	
DF	Nicolas Desenclos	Released	31 May 2012	
FW	Yacine Ghazi	Released	31 May 2012	
DF	Farès Hachi	Released	31 May 2012	
MF	Pierre Morin	Released	31 May 2012	
DF	Samuel N'Guessan	Released	31 May 2012	
GK	Thomas Pigeau	Released	31 May 2012	
DF	Pierre Pérou	Thouars	29 June 2012	
MF	Jimmy Giraudon	Grenoble	30 June 2012	

== Player statistics ==
As of 15 February 2013.

No.	Pos	Nat	Player	Total		Ligue 2		Coupe de France		Coupe de la Ligue	
No.	Pos	Nat	Player	Apps	Goals	Apps	Goals	Apps	Goals	Apps	Goals
1	GK	(France) FRA	Paul Delecroix	12	0	11	0	0	0	1	0
2	DF	(France) FRA	Johan Letzelter	29	0	21+4	0	2	0	2	0
3	DF	(France) FRA	Mickaël Courtot	0	0	0	0	0	0	0	0
4	MF	(France) FRA	Jimmy Juan	8	0	4+2	0	1	0	1	0
5	DF	(France) FRA	Quentin Bernard	39	2	35	2	2	0	2	0
6	MF	(France) FRA	Vincent Durand	21	0	14+5	0	2	0	0	0
7	MF	(France) FRA	Julien Ricaud	33	0	23+7	0	1	0	0+2	0
8	MF	(France) FRA	Johan Gastien	38	4	34	4	0+2	0	2	0
9	FW	(France) FRA	Arnaud Gonzalez	15	0	3+9	0	1	0	2	0
10	MF	(Senegal) SEN	Mouhamadou Diaw	29	2	22+4	2	1	0	2	0
11	FW	(France) FRA	Luigi Glombard	34	2	22+8	2	0+2	0	2	0
12	FW	(France) FRA	Mustapha Durak	23	7	13+7	5	1	1	2	1
14	MF	(Morocco) MAR	Youssef Essaïydy	6	0	0+5	0	1	0	0	0
15	FW	(France) FRA	Jérôme Lafourcade	27	8	22+4	8	0+1	0	0	0
16	GK	(France) FRA	Rodolphe Roche	30	0	27	0	2	0	1	0
17	FW	(Burkina Faso) BFA	Louckmane Ouédraogo	8	0	1+6	0	1	0	0	0
18	MF	(France) FRA	Greg Houla	18	3	16+2	3	0	0	0	0
19	MF	(France) FRA	Jimmy Roye	38	8	24+10	8	2	0	0+2	0
20	DF	(Morocco) MAR	Mehdi Khalis	8	0	1+5	0	0	0	1+1	0
21	DF	(France) FRA	Quentin Bachelier	0	0	0	0	0	0	0	0
22	DF	(France) FRA	Tristan Lahaye	14	0	14	0	0	0	0	0
23	DF	(Mali) MLI	Djibril Konaté	28	2	27+1	2	0	0	0	0
24	DF	(France) FRA	Nicolas Pallois	39	1	35	1	2	0	2	0
25	MF	(Benin) BEN	Djiman Koukou	9	0	6+3	0	0	0	0	0
27	DF	(Cameroon) CMR	Frédéric Bong	31	1	25+2	1	2	0	2	0
28	FW	(Senegal) SEN	Pape Sané	7	0	2+5	0	0	0	0	0
29	FW	(France) FRA	Simon Hébras	26	1	16+7	1	1+1	0	0+1	0
30	GK	(France) FRA	Pascal Elissalde	0	0	0	0	0	0	0	0
33	DF	(France) FRA	Guillaume Chassac	0	0	0	0	0	0	0	0

== Pre-season ==
Niort returned from the summer break to pre-season training on 25 June. The team travelled to Châteauroux on 1 July to spend a week at the Regional Football Institute. Niort played their first pre-season friendly match on 7 July against LB Châteauroux in Châtellerault. The game ended in a 1–1 draw; new signing Jérôme Lafourcade opened the scoring in the first half before Marcel Essombé equalised for Châteauroux from the penalty spot following a foul by Frédéric Bong. Two trialists made appearances for Niort: defender Tristan Lahaye, who signed for the club permanently two days later, and Burkinabé forward Louckmane Ouédraogo. Meanwhile, five players including new signings Paul Delecroix and Mickaël Courtot were missing through injury and Djibril Konaté was suspended. On 11 July, Niort beat Championnat National side Le Poiré-sur-Vie at the Stade René Gaillard thanks to two goals from Simon Hébras. The visitors pulled a goal back through an Emmanuel Bourgaud penalty after defender Mehdi Khalis fouled former Niort forward Romain Jacuzzi.

In the penultimate warm-up match against fellow Ligue 2 side Tours at the Stade des Champs-de-l'Îsle in Saint-Maixent-l'École, Niort came from behind to draw 1–1. Jérémy Blayac had put Tours ahead in the first half but midfielder Jimmy Juan equalised just before the hour mark to maintain the unbeaten pre-season record. The final friendly game against Le Mans ended in another 1–1 draw; Senegalese international Mouhamadou Diaw equalised from the penalty spot in the second half after Ivorian defender Mamadou Doumbia had given Le Mans the lead on 22 minutes.

=== Matches ===
7 July 2012	Châteauroux	1–1	Chamois Niortais	Stade de la Montée Rouge, Châtellerault
19:00	Essombé 73' (pen.)	Report	Lafourcade 44'	Attendance: 500 (approx.); Referee: Christian Guillard

11 July 2012	Chamois Niortais	2–1	Le Poiré-sur-Vie	Stade René Gaillard, Niort
20:00	Hébras 13', 68'	Report	Bourgaud 70' (pen.)	Attendance: 500 (approx.); Referee: Silas Billong

14 July 2012	Chamois Niortais	1–1	Tours	Stade des Champs de l'Île, Saint-Maixent-l'École
19:00	Juan 59'	Report	Blayac 30'	Attendance: 800 (approx.); Referee: Antonio Rodriguez

20 July 2012	Le Mans	1–1	Chamois Niortais	Stade des Vaugeons, Écommoy
18:00	Doumbia 22'	Report	Diaw 53' (pen.)	Attendance: 300 (approx.); Referee: William Royer

== Ligue 2 ==
The Ligue 2 fixtures for the 2012–13 season were released by the LFP on 30 May. Niort were given a home tie against Clermont Foot on 27 July for their opening fixture and will end the season against the same club on 24 May.

=== League table ===
Pos	Team	Pld	W	D	L	GF	GA	GD	Pts
13	Istres	38	11	10	17	38	45	−7	43
14	Clermont	38	9	16	13	33	47	−14	43
15	Niort	38	8	18	12	39	42	−3	42
16	Châteauroux	38	8	18	12	43	47	−4	42
17	Laval	38	10	12	16	47	54	−7	42

Source: Ligue 2
Rules for classification: 1) points; 2) goal difference; 3) number of goals scored.

=== Match information ===
27 July 2012	Chamois Niortais	1–1	Clermont Foot	Stade René Gaillard, Niort
20:30	Durak 60'	Report	Rivière 83'	Attendance: 4,754; Referee: Alexandre Perreau Niel

3 August 2012	Tours	2–2	Chamois Niortais	Stade de la Vallée du Cher, Tours
20:30	Biancardini 21'; Dutournier 69'	Report	Roye 48'; Durak 61'	Attendance: 3,854; Referee: Christian Guillard

10 August 2012	Chamois Niortais	1–0	Caen	Stade René Gaillard, Niort
18:45	Roye 8'	Report		Attendance: 4,476; Referee: Yohann Rouinsard

17 August 2012	Laval	1–0	Chamois Niortais	Stade Francis Le Basser, Laval
18:45	Gamboa 90+3'	Report		Attendance: 3,973; Referee: William Lavis

24 August 2012	Chamois Niortais	0–0	Guingamp	Stade René Gaillard, Niort
18:45		Report		Attendance: 4,122; Referee: Cédric Cotrel

31 August 2012	Istres	1–0	Chamois Niortais	Stade Parsemain, Fos-sur-Mer
18:45	Tardieu 88'			Attendance: 1,943; Referee: Olivier Husset

14 September 2012	Chamois Niortais	0–0	Arles-Avignon	Stade René Gaillard, Niort
18:45		Report		Attendance: 3,883; Referee: Alexandre Perreau Niel

21 September 2012	Le Mans	2–2	Chamois Niortais	MMArena, Le Mans
18:45	Thomas 57' (pen.), 76' (pen.)	Report	Lafourcade 26' (pen.); Diaw 90'	Attendance: 5,602; Referee: Johan Hamel

28 September 2012	Chamois Niortais	4–2	Dijon	Stade René Gaillard, Niort
18:45	Durak 9', 42', 64'; Diaw 55'	Report	Tavares 14'; Koné 90+1'	Attendance: 4,332; Referee: William Lavis

5 October 2012	Lens	1–0	Chamois Niortais	Stade Félix Bollaert, Lens
18:45	Pollet 87'	Report		Attendance: 12,072; Referee: Hakim Ben El Hadj

19 October 2012	Chamois Niortais	0–0	Le Havre	Stade René Gaillard, Niort
18:45		Report		Attendance: 4,053; Referee: Tony Chapron

2 November 2012	Chamois Niortais	1–1	AS Monaco	Stade René Gaillard, Niort
18:45	Lafourcade 68'	Report	Touré 90+2'	Attendance: 7,294; Referee: Christian Guillard

9 November 2012	Angers	0–0	Chamois Niortais	Stade Jean Bouin, Angers
18:45		Report		Attendance: 7,135; Referee: Jérôme Miguelgorry

14 November 2012	Gazélec Ajaccio	2–2	Chamois Niortais	Stade Ange Casanova, Ajaccio
18:45	Bocognano 17'; Poggi 75'	Report	Gastien 3', 20'	Attendance: 1,621; Referee: Cédric Cotrel

23 November 2012	Chamois Niortais	2–2	Châteauroux	Stade René Gaillard, Niort
18:45	Bernard 9'; Bong 90+2'	Report	Tainmont 7'; Essombé 73'	Attendance: 4,177; Referee: Dominique Julien

30 November 2012	Nantes	0–0	Chamois Niortais	Stade de la Beaujoire, Nantes
18:45		Report		Attendance: 12,122; Referee: Sébastien Moreira

11 December 2012	Auxerre	4–2	Chamois Niortais	Stade de l'Abbé Deschamps, Auxerre
19:55	Oliech 32'; Kapo 48'; Bong 59' (o.g.); Ntep 89'		Gastien 10'; Glombard 22'	Attendance: 4,389; Referee: Abdelali Chaoui

18 December 2012	Chamois Niortais	1–3	Sedan	Stade René Gaillard, Niort
20:00	Glombard 32'	Report	Koné 20', 60'; Diaby 27'	Attendance: 4,061; Referee: Christian Guillard

21 December 2012	Nîmes	3–1	Chamois Niortais	Stade des Costières, Nîmes
18:45	Gragnic 73'; Ripart 75', 87'	Report	Lafourcade 68'	Attendance: 5,306; Referee: Olivier Husset

11 January 2013	Chamois Niortais	3–1	Tours	Stade René Gaillard, Niort
20:00	Lafourcade 7' (pen.), 63' (pen.); Konaté 23'	Report	Tomas 13'	Attendance: 4,020; Referee: Didier Falcone

18 January 2013	Caen	0–1	Chamois Niortais	Stade Michel d'Ornano, Caen
20:00		Report	Roye 83'	Attendance: 7,042; Referee: Stéphane Jochem

25 January 2013	Chamois Niortais	0–0	Laval	Stade René Gaillard, Niort
20:00		Report		Attendance: 3,960; Referee: Johan Hamel

1 February 2013	Guingamp	4–3	Chamois Niortais	Stade du Roudourou, Guingamp
20:00	Yatabare 9', 15', 90+9'; Atik 68'	Report	Houla 5'; Hébras 45+1'; Bernard 76'	Attendance: 8,544; Referee: Jérôme Miguelgorry

8 February 2013	Chamois Niortais	0–0	Istres	Stade René Gaillard, Niort
20:00		Report		Attendance: 3,805; Referee: Cédric Cotrel

15 February 2013	Arles-Avignon	0–1	Chamois Niortais	Parc des Sports, Avignon
20:00		Report	Houla 36'	Attendance: 3,115; Referee: Olivier Husset

22 February 2013	Chamois Niortais	2–3	Le Mans	Stade René Gaillard, Niort
20:00	Gastien 3'; Roye 26'	Report	Sanson 50'; Thomas 63' (pen.); Zhang 80'	Attendance: 4,045; Referee: Alexandre Perreau Niel

1 March 2013	Dijon	1–1	Chamois Niortais	Stade Gaston Gérard, Dijon
20:00	Berenguer 80' (pen.)	Report	Roye 54'	Attendance: 8,703; Referee: William Lavis

8 March 2013	Chamois Niortais	0–0	Lens	Stade René Gaillard, Niort
20:00		Report		Attendance: 5,658; Referee: Dominique Julien

15 March 2013	Le Havre	2–1	Chamois Niortais	Stade Océane, Le Havre
20:00	Rivière 43'; Mesloub 90'	Report	Houla 87'	Attendance: 6,536; Referee: Johan Hamel

29 March 2013	Chamois Niortais	2–1	Gazélec Ajaccio	Stade René Gaillard, Niort
20:00	Konaté 32'; Roye 35'	Report	Novillo 80'	Attendance: 4,565; Referee: Yohann Rouinsard

5 April 2013	AS Monaco	1–1	Chamois Niortais	Stade Louis II, Monaco
20:00	Lucas Ocampos 45'	Report	Roye 36'	Attendance: 4,372; Referee: Alexandre Castro

12 April 2013	Chamois Niortais	0–0	Angers	Stade René Gaillard, Niort
20:00		Report		Attendance: 5,378; Referee: Alexandre Perreau Niel

19 April 2013	Châteauroux	1–0	Chamois Niortais	Stade Gaston Petit, Châteauroux
20:00	Orinel 56' (pen.)	Report		Attendance: 5,223; Referee: Frank Schneider

26 April 2013	Chamois Niortais	0–1	Nantes	Stade René Gaillard, Niort
20:00		Report	Aristeguieta 62'	Attendance: 8,485; Referee: Bartolomeu Varela

3 May 2013	Chamois Niortais	0–1	Auxerre	Stade René Gaillard, Niort
20:00		Report	Coulibaly 5'	Attendance: 5,666; Referee: Hakim Ben El Hadj

10 May 2013	Sedan	0–2	Chamois Niortais	Stade Louis Dugauguez, Sedan
20:00		Report	Pallois 43'; Lafourcade 85'	Attendance: 5,190; Referee: Christian Guillard

17 May 2013	Chamois Niortais	2–0	Nîmes	Stade René Gaillard, Niort
20:30	Roye 64'; Lafourcade 82'	Report		Attendance: 7,184; Referee: Stéphane Jochem

24 May 2013	Clermont Foot	1–1	Chamois Niortais	Stade Gabriel Montpied, Clermont-Ferrand
20:30	Salze 70'	Report	Lafourcade 36'	Attendance: 5,175; Referee: William Lavis

== Coupe de France ==
Niort entered the Coupe de France, the country's major cup competition, in the seventh round along with the other clubs in Ligue 2. In the draw for the seventh round, made on 31 October 2012, the team were drawn to play away against Division d'Honneur (sixth tier) side ES Guérétoise, with the match taking place on 17 November.

=== Match information ===
17 November 2012 7th round	Guéret	0–1	Chamois Niortais	Stade Léo Lagrange, Guéret
20:00			Durak 75'	Referee: Noëlle Robin

8 December 2012 8th round	Stade Bordelais	1–0	Chamois Niortais	Stade Sainte-Germaine, Bordeaux
20:00	Dupuy 63'	Report		Attendance: 1,000 (approx.); Referee: Romain Zamo

== Coupe de la Ligue ==
The club's return to professional status in 2012 meant that Niort were eligible to compete in the Coupe de la Ligue for the first time since the 2008–09 season. The draws for the first and second rounds of the competition were made on 11 July, and Niort were handed a home game against recently relegated Championnat National side Boulogne in the first round. Niort won 3–2 on penalties after the match finished goalless at the end of extra time. They were subsequently drawn to play fellow Ligue 2 outfit AS Monaco, who also won their tie against Nîmes on penalties, in the second round on 28 August. The match, again at the Stade René Gaillard, ended in a 1–2 defeat for Niort with Mustapha Durak scoring for the home side in front of a season-high crowd of 6,252.

=== Match information ===
7 August 2012 1st round	Chamois Niortais	0–0 (3–2 p)	Boulogne	Stade René Gaillard, Niort
20:00		Report		Attendance: 2,056; Referee: Florent Batta
	Penalties
	Roye (penalty missed); Diaw (penalty missed); Pallois (penalty scored); Hébras (penalty scored); Gastien (penalty scored)		Loriot (penalty missed); Allart (penalty scored); Oliveira (penalty scored); Chadili (penalty missed); Boulenger (penalty missed)

28 August 2012 2nd round	Chamois Niortais	1–2	AS Monaco	Stade René Gaillard, Niort
20:00	Durak 50'	Report	Touré 2'; Poulsen 48'	Attendance: 6,252; Referee: Benoît Millot
