= 2011–12 Chamois Niortais F.C. season =

Chamois Niortais
2011–12 season
- President: Joël Coué
- Manager: Pascal Gastien
- Stadium: Stade René Gaillard
- Championnat National: Runner-up
- Coupe de France: Round of 32
- Top goalscorer: League: Simon Hébras and Jimmy Roye (10); All: Simon Hébras (14)
Home colours

The 2011–12 season was the 86th campaign in the history of the French association football club Chamois Niortais. It was their second consecutive season in the Championnat National, the third tier of French football, after an 11th-place finish in 2010–11. Former Niort midfielder Pascal Gastien remained as manager, having been appointed to the position in 2009. Niort finished as runners-up in the Championnat National, thereby earning promotion to Ligue 2 for the 2012–13 season after a four-year absence from the second tier of French football.

== Transfers ==
In
Name	Pos	From	Date	Ref
Frédéric Bong	DF	US Créteil-Lusitanos	27 May 2011	
Paul Delecroix	GK	on loan from Amiens SC	12 June 2011	
Samuel N'Guessan	DF	LB Châteauroux	12 June 2011	
Jimmy Roye	MF	Paris FC	12 June 2011	
Sadio Sankharé	DF	Paris FC	30 June 2011	
Mustapha Durak	FW	Gap FC	1 July 2011	

Out
Name	Pos	To	Date	Ref
Kévin Bâcle	MF	Stade Bordelais	1 June 2011	
Thomas Bustreau	MF	Vendée Luçon Football	1 June 2011	
Kévin Aubeneau	GK	Stade Laval	2 June 2011	
Mamadou Camara	DF	EA Guingamp	16 June 2011	
Germain Lugier	FW	Gap FC	28 June 2011	
Nicolas Marti	MF	Vierzon Foot 18	2 July 2011	
Vincent Guignery	DF	RC Strasbourg	19 August 2011	
Carl Tourenne	DF	Retired		

== First-team appearances ==
As of 17 June 2012

No.	Pos	Nat	Player	Total		Championnat National		Coupe de France	
No.	Pos	Nat	Player	Apps	Goals	Apps	Goals	Apps	Goals
1	GK	(France) FRA	Paul Delecroix	38	0	38	0	0	0
2	DF	(France) FRA	Johan Letzelter	33	0	30	0	3	0
3	DF	(France) FRA	Farès Hachi	7	0	1+5	0	1	0
5	DF	(France) FRA	Quentin Bernard	44	0	38	0	6	0
6	MF	(France) FRA	Vincent Durand	29	1	27	0	2	1
7	MF	(France) FRA	Julien Ricaud	42	2	21+15	1	5+1	1
8	MF	(France) FRA	Johan Gastien	35	4	31+1	3	3	1
9	FW	(France) FRA	Arnaud Gonzalez	33	10	24+6	9	3	1
10	MF	(Senegal) SEN	Mouhamadou Diaw	39	10	32+2	9	5	1
11	FW	(France) FRA	Luigi Glombard	35	7	25+6	7	2+2	0
12	FW	(France) FRA	Mustapha Durak	25	6	12+10	5	1+2	1
13	MF	(France) FRA	Jimmy Giraudon	21	0	5+11	0	3+2	0
14	FW	(France) FRA	Alassane N'Diaye	22	2	3+15	2	2+2	0
15	DF	(France) FRA	Sadio Sankharé	0	0	0	0	0	0
16	GK	(France) FRA	Pascal Landais	4	0	0+1	0	3	0
19	MF	(France) FRA	Jimmy Roye	40	12	34+1	10	5	2
20	FW	(France) FRA	Yacine Ghazi	6	5	0+4	1	1+1	4
21	DF	(France) FRA	Quentin Bachelier	0	0	0	0	0	0
22	DF	(France) FRA	Nicolas Desenclos	12	0	9+3	0	0	0
23	DF	(Mali) MLI	Djibril Konaté	34	2	30	2	4	0
24	DF	(France) FRA	Samuel N'Guessan	8	0	4+2	0	2	0
27	DF	(Senegal) SEN	Frédéric Bong	37	1	32+1	1	4	0
28	MF	(France) FRA	Pierre Morin	2	0	0	0	1+1	0
29	FW	(France) FRA	Simon Hébras	43	14	22+15	10	4+2	4
30	GK	(France) FRA	Thomas Pigeau	3	0	0	0	3	0
	DF	(France) FRA	Guillaume Chassac	1	0	0	0	1	0
	MF	(France) FRA	Rémy Mallot	1	0	0	0	1	0

== Championnat National ==
Niort began their season with a 2–1 home win against Gazélec Ajaccio thanks to goals from new signings Mustapha Durak and Jimmy Roye. The pair scored again in the following match, a 2–2 draw away at SR Colmar. The team continued their unbeaten start to the season with a 4–0 defeat of US Luzenac on 19 August 2011.

=== Match results ===
Key

- In Result column, Niort score shown first
- pen. = Penalty kick
- o.g. = Own goal

Results

Date	Opponents	Result	Goalscorers	Attendance
5 August 2011	Gazélec Ajaccio (H)	2–1	Roye, Durak	3,500
12 August 2011	Colmar (A)	2–2	Durak, Roye	2,000
19 August 2011	Luzenac (H)	4–0	Konaté, Hébras, Durak, Diaw	3,514
26 August 2011	Créteil (A)	2–1	Gonzalez, Durak	350
2 September 2011	Le Poiré-sur-Vie (H)	1–0	Glombard	3,500
9 September 2011	Vannes (A)	0–1		2,541
16 September 2011	Fréjus (H)	2–0	Diaw, Glombard	3,500
20 September 2011	Rouen (A)	2–2	Roye, Gonzalez	3,644
24 September 2011	Red Star (H)	4–0	Glombard, Ricaud, Bong, Ghazi	3,084
30 September 2011	Nîmes (A)	2–3	Gonzalez (2)	4,282
7 October 2011	Martigues (H)	3–1	Gastien, Diaw, Gonzalez	3,000
12 October 2011	Cherbourg (A)	2–1	N'Diaye, Roye	1,659
21 October 2011	Paris FC (H)	0–2		3,500
6 November 2011	Épinal (A)	1–2	Glombard	1,800
11 November 2011	Besançon (H)	3–0	Gonzalez (2), Roye	2,957
26 November 2011	Bayonne (H)	4–0	Diaw, Gonzalez, N'Diaye, Hébras	4,085
2 December 2011	Orléans (A)	5–1	Diaw (2), Glombard (2), Hébras	1,850
16 December 2011	Quevilly (H)	2–0	Gonzalez, Roye	2,819
20 December 2011	Beauvais (A)	2–2	Ricaud, Durak	1,470
14 January 2012	Colmar (H)	2–1	Roye, Diaw	2,800
28 January 2012	Luzenac (A)	1–1	Bernard	500
17 February 2012	Vannes (H)	0–0		3,000
21 February 2012	Créteil (H)	0–2		2,300
25 February 2012	Fréjus (A)	0–0		1,100
10 March 2012	Red Star (A)	2–1	Hébras (2)	1,834
16 March 2012	Nîmes (H)	1–1	Konaté	4,000
23 March 2012	Martigues (A)	1–2	Glombard	589
27 March 2012	Le Poiré-sur-Vie (A)	0–1		2,574
30 March 2012	Cherbourg (H)	2–0	Hébras (2)	2,500
7 April 2012	Paris FC (A)	1–0	Hébras	500
13 April 2012	Épinal (H)	0–0		4,418
17 April 2012	Rouen (H)	3–0	Gastien, Diaw, Roye	5,000
21 April 2012	Besançon (A)	1–1	Hébras	1,687
27 April 2012	Bayonne (A)	1–1	Roye	450
4 May 2012	Orléans (H)	0–1		6,500
11 May 2012	Quevilly (A)	2–0	Gastien, Diaw	1,280
18 May 2012	Beauvais (H)	0–2		6,500
26 May 2012	Gazélec Ajaccio (A)	1–0	Roye	3,500

== Coupe de France ==
Round	Date	Opponents	Result	Goalscorers	Attendance
Fifth round	15 October 2011	Saint-Maixent (A)	5–0	Durand, Ghazi (4)	1,100
Sixth round	29 October 2011	Royan Vaux (A)	1–0	Gastien	554
Seventh round	19 November 2011	Tarbes (A)	4–1 (aet)	Gonzalez, Hébras (2), Diaw	500
Eighth round	10 December 2011	Bayonne (H)	3–2	Ricaud, Hébras, Durak	2,000
Round of 64	7 January 2012	Brest (H)	2–0	Roye (2)	8,322
Round of 32	21 January 2012	Orléans (H)	1–2	Hébras	5,135
