= List of French football transfers summer 2012 =

This is a list of French football transfers for the 2012 summer transfer window. The summer transfer window opened on 13 June 2012 and closed at midnight on 4 September 2012. Only moves involving Ligue 1 and Ligue 2 clubs are listed. Players without a club may join one at any time, either during or in between transfer windows.

== Transfers ==
Date	Name	Moving from	Moving to	Fee
8 May 2012	(France) Claudio Beauvue	Troyes	Châteauroux	Free
11 May 2012	(France) Julian Palmieri	Istres	Bastia	Free
14 May 2012	(The Gambia) Abdou Rahman Dampha	(Switzerland) Neuchâtel Xamax	Nancy	Free
22 May 2012	(Italy) Andrea Raggi	(Italy) Bologna	AS Monaco	Free
24 May 2012	(France) Romain Grange	Châteauroux	Nancy	Free
1 June 2012	(France) Thomas Ayasse	Arles-Avignon	Nancy	Free
5 June 2012	(France) Youssouf Touré	Colmar	Gazélec Ajaccio	Free
5 June 2012	(Senegal) Salif Sané	Bordeaux	Nancy	€1.2m
6 June 2012	(France) Rodolphe Roche	Saint-Louis Neuweg	Niort	Free
7 June 2012	(Senegal) Ousmane Traoré	(Belgium) Turnhout	Laval	Free
7 June 2012	(France) Makan Traoré	Valenciennes	Laval	Free
7 June 2012	(France) Jimmy Juan	(England) Chesterfield	Niort	Free
7 June 2012	(Morocco) Mehdi Khalis	Drancy	Niort	Free
8 June 2012	(France) Kévin Afougou	Paris	Châteauroux	Free
9 June 2012	(France) Farid Bezouien	Red Star Saint-Ouen	Sedan	Free
9 June 2012	(France) Jean-Bryan Boukaka	Rennes	Tours	Free
11 June 2012	(France) Ismaël Traoré	Sedan	Brest	Free
11 June 2012	(France) Benjamin Nivet	Caen	Troyes	Free
12 June 2012	(Poland) Grzegorz Krychowiak	Bordeaux	Reims	Free
12 June 2012	(France) Amor Kehiha	Istres	Gazélec Ajaccio	Free
13 June 2012	(France) Thomas Gaudu	Louhans-Cuiseaux	Angers	Free
13 June 2012	(France) Pascal Elissalde	Cognac	Niort	Free
13 June 2012	(France) Geoffrey Malfleury	Red Star Saint-Ouen	Le Havre	Free
13 June 2012	(France) Clément Tainmont	Reims	Châteauroux	Free
13 June 2012	(France) Nicolas Fauvergue	Sedan	Reims	Free
13 June 2012	(France) Franck Signorino	Laval	Reims	Free
13 June 2012	(France) Nicolas Flégeau	Istres	Gazélec Ajaccio	Free
14 June 2012	(Senegal) Ricardo Faty	(Greece) Aris	Ajaccio	Free
14 June 2012	(France) Noui Laïfa	Créteil	Gazélec Ajaccio	Free
14 June 2012	(Algeria) Habib Bellaïd	(Germany) Eintracht Frankfurt	Sedan	Free
14 June 2012	(France) Benjamin Jeannot	Nancy	Châteauroux	Loan
15 June 2012	(France) Alifousseyni Touncara	Lyon	Clermont	Free
15 June 2012	(France) Christophe Mandanne	Dijon	Guingamp	Free
15 June 2012	(Senegal) Deme N'Diaye	Arles-Avignon	Lens	Free
15 June 2012	(France) Damien Mayenga	Vendée Luçon	Nantes	Free
15 June 2012	(France) Eric Bauthéac	Dijon	Nice	Free
16 June 2012	(Benin) Jordan Adéoti	Colomiers	Laval	Free
16 June 2012	(France) Bilal Hamdi	Lens	Laval	Free
17 June 2012	(France) Quentin Rouger	Rennes	Guingamp	Loan
18 June 2012	(France) Birama Touré	Beauvais	Nantes	Free
18 June 2012	(France) Romain Poyet	Brest	Caen	Free
19 June 2012	(France) Fabien Boyer	Rennes	Angers	Free
19 June 2012	(France) Renaud Cohade	Valenciennes	Saint-Étienne	Free
19 June 2012	(France) Damien Marcq	Caen	Sedan	Loan
19 June 2012	(France) Yohan Betsch	Metz	Laval	Free
19 June 2012	(France) Renaud Dreuslin	Tour Auvergne Rennes	Laval	Free
19 June 2012	(France) Mathieu Robail	Bastia	Nîmes	Free
19 June 2012	(Mali) Cédric Kanté	(Greece) Panathinaikos	Sochaux	Free
20 June 2012	(France) Rémy Bonne	Uzès Pont du Gard	Lens	Free
20 June 2012	(France) Gaëtan Charbonnier	Angers	Montpellier	Free
20 June 2012	(France) Jonathan Zebina	Brest	Toulouse	Free
20 June 2012	(France) Daniel Congré	Toulouse	Montpellier	Undisclosed
20 June 2012	(France) Marvin Martin	Sochaux	Lille	Undisclosed
21 June 2012	(France) David de Freitas	Angers	Châteauroux	Free
21 June 2012	(France) Emeric Dudouit	Caen	Châteauroux	Free
21 June 2012	(Democratic Republic of the Congo) Distel Zola	Nancy	Le Havre	Free
21 June 2012	(Denmark) Daniel Wass	(Portugal) Benfica	Evian	Undisclosed
21 June 2012	(France) Simon Pouplin	(Germany) SC Freiburg	Sochaux	Free
21 June 2012	(France) Thomas Mangani	AS Monaco	Nancy	Free
21 June 2012	(France) Jérôme Lafourcade	Châteauroux	Niort	Free
22 June 2012	(Ivory Coast) Thierry Doubai	(Italy) Udinese	Sochaux	Undisclosed
22 June 2012	(France) Rémy Riou	Toulouse	Nantes	Free
22 June 2012	(France) Julien Toudic	Lens	Reims	Loan
22 June 2012	(France) Loris Néry	Saint-Étienne	Valenciennes	€1m
22 June 2012	(France) Yoric Ravet	Saint-Étienne	Angers	Loan
22 June 2012	(France) Yohan Mollo	(Spain) Granada	Nancy	Undisclosed
22 June 2012	(France) Pierre Bouby	Metz	Nîmes	Free
22 June 2012	(France) Stéphane Darbion	(Greece) Skoda Xanthi	Nantes	Free
22 June 2012	(France) Olivier Blondel	Troyes	Toulouse	Free
23 June 2012	(France) Jonathan Martins Pereira	Nantes	Guingamp	Free
23 June 2012	(Denmark) Jakob Poulsen	(Denmark) Midtjylland	AS Monaco	Undisclosed
23 June 2012	(France) Thomas Fontaine	Lyon	Tours	Free
23 June 2012	(France) Nicolas Séguin	Lyon	Tours	Free
23 June 2012	(France) Xavier Chavalerin	Lyon	Tours	Free
23 June 2012	(Slovakia) Erik Pačinda	(Slovakia) Košice	Tours	Loan
23 June 2012	(France) Loïc Nestor	Le Havre	Châteauroux	Free
23 June 2012	(Venezuela) Gabriel Cichero	Lens	Nantes	Loan
23 June 2012	(France) Julien Cardy	Tours	Arles-Avignon	Free
25 June 2012	(France) Erwan Quintin	Vannes	Arles-Avignon	Free
25 June 2012	(France) Timothée Kolodziejczak	Lyon	Nice	Free
25 June 2012	(Democratic Republic of the Congo) Cédric Lubasa	Clermont	Gazélec Ajaccio	Free
27 June 2012	(Belgium) Brandon Deville	(Belgium) Anderlecht	Ajaccio	Free
27 June 2012	(Mali) Sambou Yatabaré	AS Monaco	Bastia	Free
27 June 2012	(Republic of the Congo) Oscar Ewolo	Brest	Laval	Free
27 June 2012	(France) Gaëtan Varenne	Cournon-d'Auvergne	Bastia	Free
27 June 2012	(France) Jean-Jacques Mandrichi	Châteauroux	Gazélec Ajaccio	Free
28 June 2012	(Guinea) Ibrahima Diallo	(Belgium) Waasland-Beveren	Angers	Free
28 June 2012	(France) Chakhir Belghazouani	(Belgium) Zulte Waregem	Ajaccio	Free
28 June 2012	(France) Romain Alessandrini	Clermont	Rennes	€2m
28 June 2012	(France) Romain Genevois	Tours	Nice	Free
28 June 2012	(France) Terence Makengo	AS Monaco	Auxerre	Loan
28 June 2012	(Democratic Republic of the Congo) Granddi Ngoyi	Paris Saint-Germain	Troyes	Free
29 June 2012	(France) Anthony Mounier	Nice	Montpellier	€3.5m
30 June 2012	(France) Nicolas Pallois	Valenciennes	Niort	Free
30 June 2012	(France) Geoffrey Dernis	Montpellier	Brest	Free
30 June 2012	(Republic of the Congo) Delvin Ndinga	Auxerre	AS Monaco	€5m
2 July 2012	(France) Evan Chevalier	Bordeaux	Gazélec Ajaccio	Loan
2 July 2012	(France) Joris Delle	Metz	Nice	Free
2 July 2012	(France) Antoine Devaux	Toulouse	Reims	Free
2 July 2012	(France) Steeve Elana	Brest	Lille	Free
2 July 2012	(Argentina) Ezequiel Lavezzi	(Italy) Napoli	Paris Saint-Germain	€30m
3 July 2012	(France) Jérôme Lemoigne	Sedan	Lens	Free
3 July 2012	(Mali) Sigamary Diarra	Lorient	Ajaccio	Free
3 July 2012	(France) Mathieu Duhamel	Metz	Caen	Free
3 July 2012	(France) Yannick Gigliarelli	Ajaccio	Gazélec Ajaccio	Free
3 July 2012	(Greece) Viktor Klonaridis	(Greece) AEK Athens	Lille	€800k
3 July 2012	(Netherlands) Charlison Benschop	(Netherlands) AZ	Brest	Free
3 July 2012	(Morocco) Kamel Chafni	Auxerre	Brest	Free
3 July 2012	(France) Alharbi El-Jadeyaoui	Guingamp	Angers	Free
5 July 2012	(Mali) Abdoulwhaid Sissoko	(Italy) Udinese	Brest	Loan
5 July 2012	(Benin) Emmanuel Imorou	(Portugal) Braga	Clermont	Free
6 July 2012	(France) Youness El-Baillal	Mantes	Paris Saint-Germain	Free
6 July 2012	(Argentina) Emanuel Herrera	(Chile) Unión Española	Montpellier	€3m
6 July 2012	(Algeria) Kamel Ghilas	(England) Hull City	Reims	Free
7 July 2012	(Ivory Coast) Salomon Kalou	(England) Chelsea	Lille	Free
9 July 2012	(France) François Clerc	Nice	Saint-Étienne	Free
9 July 2012	(Algeria) Ahmed Reda Madouni	(Germany) Union Berlin	Nantes	Free
9 July 2012	(France) Tristan Lahaye	Châteauroux	Niort	Free
10 July 2012	(Guinea) Sadio Diallo	Bastia	Rennes	Undisclosed
10 July 2012	(France) Lucas Déaux	Reims	Nantes	Free
10 July 2012	(Tunisia) Zouheir Dhaouadi	(Tunisia) Club Africain	Evian	Free
10 July 2012	(Sweden) Emir Bajrami	(Netherlands) Twente	AS Monaco	Loan
11 July 2012	(Brazil) Jonas Pessalli	(Brazil) Grêmio	Angers	Loan
11 July 2012	(Ivory Coast) Christian Kouakou	(Thailand) Muangthong United	Tours	Free
11 July 2012	(France) Matthieu Dreyer	Fréjus Saint-Raphaël	Troyes	Free
11 July 2012	(France) Riad Nouri	Istres	Le Havre	€150k
12 July 2012	(France) Florian Pinteaux	AS Monaco	Sedan	Loan
12 July 2012	(France) Pierrick Valdivia	Sedan	Lens	Free
12 July 2012	(Tunisia) Iheb Mbarki	(Tunisia) Bizertin	Evian	Free
12 July 2012	(France) Alexis Thébaux	Caen	Brest	Free
12 July 2012	(Brazil) Ilan	Ajaccio	Bastia	Free
13 July 2012	(Gabon) Rémy Ebanega	(Gabon) Bitam	Auxerre	Free
13 July 2012	(Gabon) Henri Junior Ndong	(Gabon) Bitam	Auxerre	Free
13 July 2012	(France) Richard Socrier	Ajaccio	Angers	Free
13 July 2012	(France) Brice Maubleu	Grenoble	Tours	Free
13 July 2012	(France) Virgile Reset	Boulogne-sur-Mer	Sedan	Loan
13 July 2012	(France) Roy Contout	Auxerre	Sochaux	Free
14 July 2012	(Brazil) Thiago Silva	(Italy) Milan	Paris Saint-Germain	€42m
18 July 2012	(France) Rudy Riou	Nantes	Lens	Undisclosed
18 July 2012	(France) Roy Contout	Auxerre	Sochaux	Undisclosed
18 July 2012	(Italy) Marco Verratti	(Italy) Pescara	Paris Saint-Germain	€12m
18 July 2012	(Sweden) Zlatan Ibrahimović	(Italy) Milan	Paris Saint-Germain	€23m
19 July 2012	(France) Romain Hamouma	Caen	Saint-Étienne	Undisclosed
20 July 2012	(Burkina Faso) Djakaridja Koné	(Romania) Dinamo București	Evian	Undisclosed
21 July 2012	(Burkina Faso) Alain Traoré	Auxerre	Lorient	Undisclosed
23 July 2012	(Ghana) Ishmael Yartey	Benfica	Sochaux	Undisclosed
24 July 2012	(France) Djibril Sidibé	Troyes	Lille	Undisclosed
26 July 2012	(France) Yohann Eudeline	Sedan	Nantes	Undisclosed
27 July 2012	(France) Sylvain Marchal	Saint-Étienne	Bastia	Free
27 July 2012	(Burkina Faso) Romain Inez	Châteauroux	Metz	Free
27 July 2012	(France) Marco Ramos	(Portugal) Braga	Auxerre	Undisclosed
30 July 2012	(France) Derek Decamps	(Norway) Haugesund	Angers	Undisclosed
30 July 2012	(France) Ladislas Douniama	Lorient	Arles-Avignon	Loan
31 July 2012	(France) Anthony Modeste	Bordeaux	Bastia	Loan
31 July 2012	(France) Ludovic Giuly	AS Monaco	Lorient	Free
31 July 2012	(France) Landry Bonnefoi	Amiens	Bastia	Undisclosed
1 August 2012	(France) Olivier Thomert	Lens	Le Mans	Undisclosed

- ^1 Player who signs with a club before the transfer window opens in June 2012 can officially join his new club on 1 July 2012, while a player who joins after the open of the transfer window will join his new club following his signature of the contract.
