= Simon Hébras =

French footballer (born 1988)

Personal information
- Full name: Simon Hébras
- Date of birth: 9 March 1988 (age 38)
- Place of birth: Poitiers, France
- Height: 1.76 m (5 ft 9 in)
- Positions: Striker; attacking midfielder

Team information
- Current team: Stade Bordelais

Youth career
- 2002–2007: Chamois Niortais

Senior career*
Years	Team	Apps	(Gls)
2007–2015	Chamois Niortais	158	(33)
2014	→ Luzenac (loan)	17	(0)
2015	Le Poiré-sur-Vie	17	(5)
2015–2017	Boulogne	38	(5)
2016–2017	→ Boulogne II	9	(1)
2017–	Stade Bordelais	?	(?)
- * Club domestic league appearances and goals as of 6 February 2018

Simon Hébras (born 9 March 1988) is a French professional footballer currently playing for Stade Bordelais as a forward.

== Club career ==
He joined Chamois Niortais in 2002 at the age of fourteen, and made his first-team début for the club in Ligue 2 in the 1–1 draw with Angers on 22 February 2008. Hébras went on to play more than 150 league games for Niort, spanning almost eight seasons.

He scored his first senior goal on 15 August 2009 in the 1–1 draw with Les Herbiers VF in the Championnat de France amateur. In 2014, he spent a loan spell at Championnat National side Luzenac, where he was part of the team that finished as runners-up to champions US Orléans.

In January 2015 Hébras returned to the Championnat National, signing a permanent deal with Le Poiré-sur-Vie.

== Career statistics ==
As of 15 October 2016.

Appearances and goals by club, season and competition
Club	Season	League			Cup		League Cup		Total	
Club	Season	Division	Apps	Goals	Apps	Goals	Apps	Goals	Apps	Goals
Chamois Niortais	2007–08	Ligue 2	2	0	0	0	0	0	2	0
Chamois Niortais	2008–09	National	5	0	0	0	0	0	5	0
Chamois Niortais	2009–10	CFA Group C	34	17	3	3	–	–	37	20
Chamois Niortais	2010–11	National	38	5	1	0	–	–	38	5
Chamois Niortais	2011–12	National	37	10	6	4	–	–	40	13
Chamois Niortais	2012–13	Ligue 2	23	1	1	0	1	0	25	1
Chamois Niortais	2013–14	Ligue 2	13	0	2	0	0	0	15	0
Chamois Niortais	2014–15	Ligue 2	6	0	0	0	1	0	7	0
Chamois Niortais	Total		158	33	13	7	2	0	173	40
Luzenac (loan)	2013–14	National	17	0	0	0	0	0	17	0
Le Poiré-sur-Vie	2014–15	National	17	5	1	0	0	0	18	5
Boulogne	2015–16	National	33	4	6	1	0	0	39	5
Boulogne	2016–17	National	3	0	0	0	0	0	3	0
Boulogne	Total		36	4	6	1	0	0	42	5
Career total			228	42	20	8	2	0	250	50
