= Charly Dutournier =

French professional footballer (born 1994)

Personal information
- Date of birth: 15 May 1994 (age 32)
- Place of birth: Bordeaux, France
- Height: 1.85 m (6 ft 1 in)
- Position: Forward

Youth career
- 2000–2001: US Tresnaise
- 2001–2006: Coteaux de Garonne
- 2006–2007: Jeunesse Villenavaise
- 2007–2009: Bordeaux
- 2009–2011: SA Mérignac

Senior career*
Years	Team	Apps	(Gls)
2011–2014	Tours	6	(1)
2014–2015	Stade Bordelais	28	(13)
2015–2018	Dijon II	14	(1)
2015–2018	Dijon	0	(0)
2015	→ Boulogne (loan)	2	(0)
2016–2017	→ Concarneau (loan)	34	(8)
2017–2018	→ Avranches (loan)	30	(2)
2018–2019	Stade Bordelais	23	(5)
2019–2020	Villefranche	6	(0)
2020–2022	Stade Briochin	35	(1)
2020–2022	Stade Briochin II	7	(1)
2022	Angoulême	12	(0)
2022–2023	Belfort	29	(7)
2023–2024	Haguenau	9	(0)
2024–2025	Montlouis	13	(0)
2025	Stade Bordelais	9	(0)

International career
2013	France U19	1	(0)
2013	France U20	2	(2)
- * Club domestic league appearances and goals as of 26 October 2025

Charly Dutournier (born 15 May 1994) is a French professional footballer who plays as a forward. He began his career in the youth team at hometown club Bordeaux before joining Tours in 2011.

== Playing career ==
Dutournier started his career with Bordeaux, but did not make an appearance for either the first team or the reserves and was released by the club in the summer of 2011. He subsequently joined Ligue 2 outfit Tours, where he spent the majority of the 2011–12 campaign in the reserve team before making his professional debut on 11 February 2012, coming on as a late substitute for Billy Ketkeophomphone in the 0–1 defeat away at Istres. Tours manager Peter Zeidler handed Dutournier his first senior start on 3 August 2012 in the opening home match of the 2012–13 season and he scored the equalising goal in the 2–2 draw with Chamois Niortais after goals from Jimmy Roye and Mustapha Durak had given the visitors the lead.

In the summer of 2014, Dutournier left Tours and joined Stade Bordelais in Championnat de France Amateur. After a good season with the club, during which he scored thirteen goals, he signed a two-year deal with Dijon FCO and was immediately loaned out to US Boulogne for the 2015–16 season. The loan was terminated in November, having not given Dutournier the required game time. He was loaned to US Concarneau for the 2016–17 season, with much more success, leading to coach Nicolas Cloarec declaring a wish to secure his services again. Dutournier was loaned to US Avranches for the 2017–18 season, the last of his Dijon contract.

In October 2018, Dutournier rejoined Stade Bordelais. In June 2019 he signed for Villefranche, but after making only one appearance he moved to Stade Briochin in January 2020.

On 27 January 2022, Dutournier moved to Angoulême in Championnat National 2.

== Career statistics ==
As of 22 January 2021.

Appearances and goals by club, season and competition
Club	Division	Season	League		Coupe de France		Coupe de la Ligue		Total	
Club	Division	Season	Apps	Goals	Apps	Goals	Apps	Goals	Apps	Goals
Tours	Ligue 2	2011–12	1	0	0	0	0	0	1	0
Tours	Ligue 2	2012–13	5	1	0	0	1	0	6	1
Tours	Ligue 2	2013–14	0	0	0	0	0	0	0	0
Stade Bordelais	CFA Group D	2014–15	28	13	1	0	0	0	29	13
Dijon	Ligue 2	2015–16	0	0	0	0	0	0	0	0
Boulogne (loan)	National	2015–16	2	0	0	0	0	0	2	0
Concarneau (loan)	National	2016–17	34	8	0	0	—		34	8
Avranches (loan)	National	2017–18	30	2	0	0	—		30	2
Stade Bordelais	National 2	2018–19	23	5	0	0	—		23	5
Villefranche	National	2019–20	6	0	2	0	—		8	0
Stade Briochin	National 2	2019–20	4	0	—		—		4	0
Stade Briochin	National	2020–21	19	1	0	0	—		19	1
Total			152	30	3	0	1	0	156	30
