= Louckmane Ouédraogo =

Burkinabé footballer

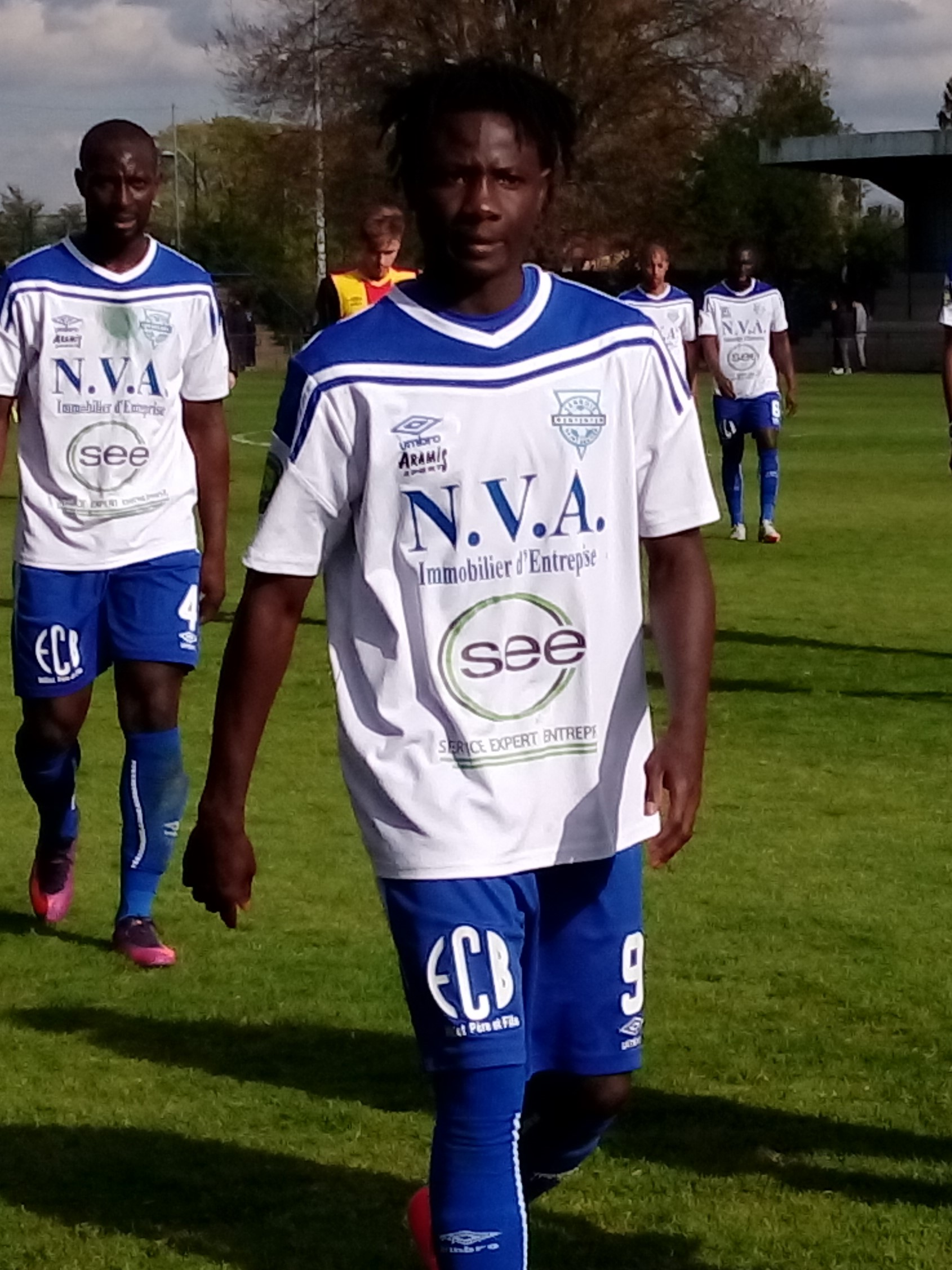
- Ouédraogo with Entente SSG in 2017

Personal information
- Full name: Soutongo Louckmane Ouédraogo
- Date of birth: 17 October 1992 (age 34)
- Place of birth: Ouagadougou, Burkina Faso
- Height: 1.70 m (5 ft 7 in)
- Position: Winger

Team information
- Current team: Chaumontois

Youth career
- 2008–2012: Feyenoord Ghana

Senior career*
Years	Team	Apps	(Gls)
2012	ASFA Yennenga		
2012–2014	Niort	7	(0)
2013–2014	→ Boulogne (loan)	15	(0)
2015	Istres	12	(2)
2015–2016	Chambly	7	(1)
2016–2018	Entente SSG	48	(17)
2018	Cholet	7	(0)
2019	Tours II	2	(3)
2019	Tours	10	(0)
2020	Rouen	3	(0)
2020–2022	Entente SSG	20	(8)
2022–	Chaumontois		

International career
2009	Burkina Faso U17	4	(1)
- * Club domestic league appearances and goals as of 22:03, 21 December 2020 (UTC)

Soutongo Louckmane Ouédraogo (born 17 October 1992) is a Burkinabé professional footballer who plays as a winger for French club CS Chaumontois.

He played for the Feyenoord Ghana academy as a youth and later played senior football in his home country with ASFA Yennenga before moving to France to join Chamois Niortais in the summer of 2012.

In 2009, Ouédraogo represented Burkina Faso at the FIFA Under-17 World Cup in Nigeria.

== Club career ==
Ouédraogo was born in Ouagadougou, the capital of Burkina Faso. Between 2008 and 2012, Ouédraogo played at the Feyenoord Ghana football academy, the African branch of the Dutch club Feyenoord Rotterdam. In July 2012, while playing for Ouagadougou-based side ASFA Yennenga, he was offered a trial at newly promoted French Ligue 2 outfit Chamois Niortais. After impressing in several pre-season friendly matches he was signed by the club on a permanent contract. He began the season playing in the reserves before making his senior debut for Niort on 5 October 2012, coming on as a late substitute for Johan Gastien in a 1–0 defeat away at Lens. He again entered play as a substitute in the team's next match two weeks later, playing the last 15 minutes of the goalless draw with Le Havre at the Stade René Gaillard. After making a further four substitute appearance, Ouédraogo was handed the first start of his career in the final game of the 2012–13 campaign, a 1–1 draw at Clermont Foot.

For the 2013–14 season, Ouédraogo was loaned to Championnat National outfit US Boulogne in order to gain first-team experience. He went on to make 15 league appearances for the club. Upon his return to Niort ahead of the 2014–15 campaign, Ouédraogo was involved in the club's pre-season friendly matches by new manager Régis Brouard. However, he was ultimately unable to break into the first team and agreed to terminate his contract with the club by mutual consent in September 2014. He subsequently spent a period on trial at Championnat de France amateur side Beauvais, but no offer was made to the player.

Ouédraogo eventually signed for National club Istres in January 2015 following a successful trial spell. His signing was announced on the same day as that of fellow trialist Cédric Bétrémieux.

After two years with L'Entente SSG and six months with SO Cholet, he moved to Tours FC in January 2019.

== International career ==
Ouédraogo was selected to represent Burkina Faso at the 2009 FIFA U-17 World Cup in Nigeria as part of a 21-man squad, and went on to score one goal in four games. He appeared as a substitute in all three of the country's Group D matches as the team progressed to the round of 16 after finishing as group runners-up behind Turkey, scoring his first international goal in the 4–1 win over Costa Rica on 31 October 2009. Ouédraogo again entered play as a substitute in the side's final game of the tournament, a 4–1 defeat to the eventual third-placed team Spain.

== Career statistics ==
As of 1 May 2017

Appearances and goals by club, season and competition
Club	Season	League			Coupe de France		Coupe de la Ligue		Total	
Club	Season	Division	Apps	Goals	Apps	Goals	Apps	Goals	Apps	Goals
Chamois Niortais	2012–13	Ligue 2	7	0	1	0	0	0	8	0
Boulogne (loan)	2013–14	Championnat National	15	0	3	1	0	0	18	1
Istres	2014–15	Championnat National	12	2	0	0	0	0	12	2
Chambly	2015–16	Championnat National	7	1	1	1	0	0	8	2
L'Entente SSG	2016–17	CFA Group B	21	9	0	0	0	0	21	9
Career total			62	12	5	2	0	0	67	14
