= Yassin Chadili =

French footballer (born 1988)

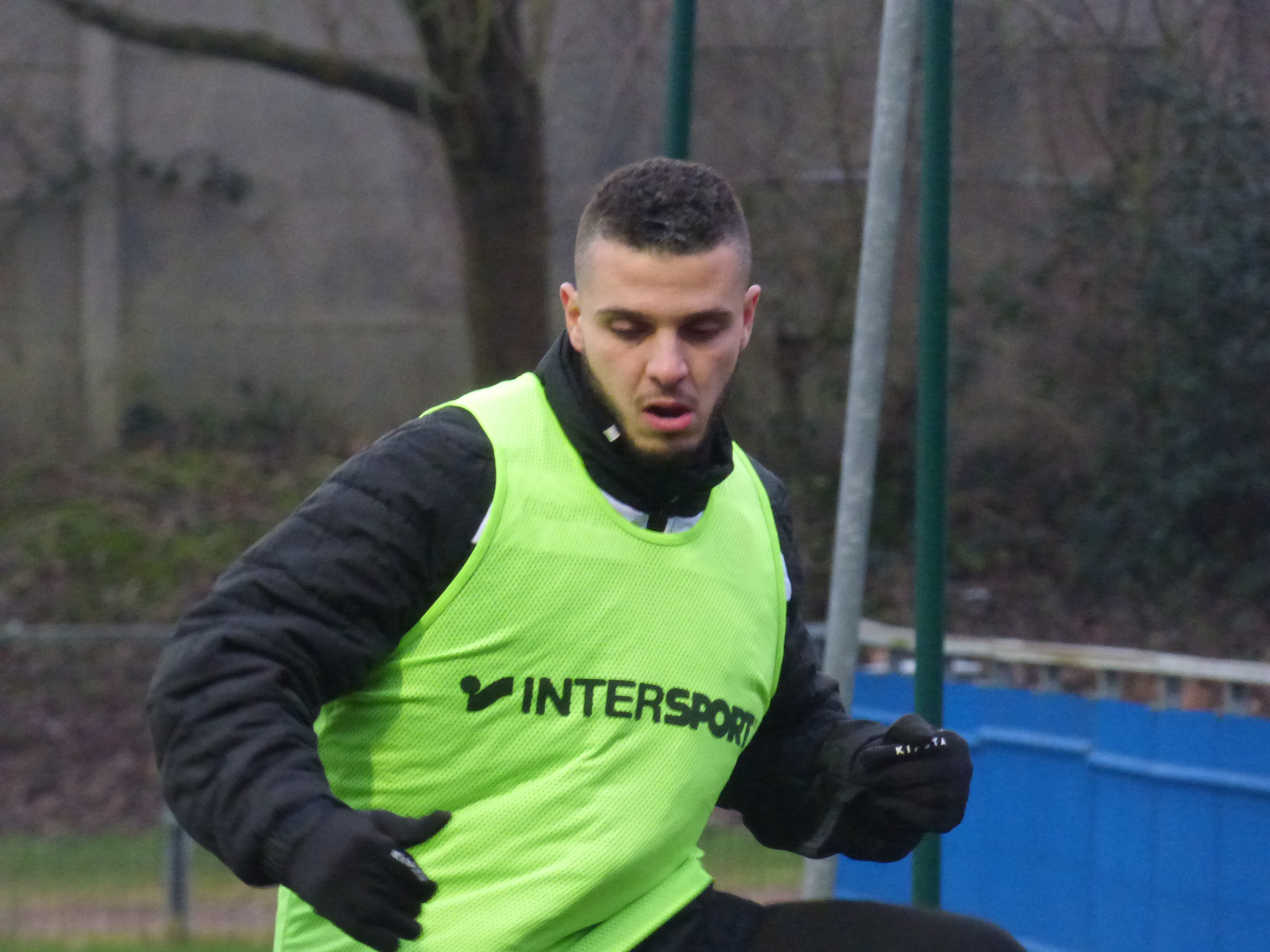
- Chadili in 2018

Personal information
- Date of birth: 10 August 1988 (age 38)
- Place of birth: Dunkerque, France
- Height: 1.78 m (5 ft 10 in)
- Position: Midfielder

Youth career
- Grande-Synthe

Senior career*
Years	Team	Apps	(Gls)
2009–2013	Boulogne	37	(7)
2013–2016	Épinal	60	(16)
2016–2018	Sedan	42	(5)
2019	Grande-Synthe	3	(0)
- * Club domestic league appearances and goals as of 20:48, 29 December 2019 (UTC)

Yassin Chadili (born 10 August 1988) is a French professional footballer who plays as a midfielder. He has previously played for Boulogne, where he made 17 appearances in Ligue 2, and Épinal.

== Personal life ==
Chadili was born in France and is of Moroccan descent.

== Career statistics ==
As of 30 January 2018

Appearances and goals by club, season and competition
Club	Season	League			Coupe de France		Coupe de la Ligue		Total	
Club	Season	Division	Apps	Goals	Apps	Goals	Apps	Goals	Apps	Goals
Boulogne	2010–11	Ligue 2	4	0	0	0	2	0	6	0
Boulogne	2011–12	Ligue 2	13	1	0	0	1	0	14	1
Boulogne	2012–13	National	20	6	1	0	1	0	22	7
Épinal	2013–14	CFA Group B	16	6	2	0	0	0	18	6
Épinal	2014–15	National	15	3	0	0	0	0	15	3
Épinal	2015–16	National	29	7	0	0	0	0	29	7
Sedan	2016–17	National	23	3	1	0	0	0	24	3
Sedan	2017–18	National 2 Group C	9	2	0	0	0	0	9	2
Career total			129	28	5	0	4	0	138	28
