= Thomas Fernandez =

French footballer (born 1970)

Personal information
- Date of birth: 3 August 1970 (age 56)
- Place of birth: Albi, France
- Height: 1.78 m (5 ft 10 in)
- Position: Defender

Team information
- Current team: Al-Ittihad (assistant)

Youth career
- 1977–1985: Albi
- 1985–1988: Toulouse

Senior career*
Years	Team	Apps	(Gls)
1988–1994	Toulouse	54	(0)
1994–1996	Pau	43	(3)
1996–1997	Olympique Alès	29	(3)
1997–1999	Montauban	61	(2)
1999–2001	La Roche-sur-Yon	61	(1)
2001–2002	Vendée Poiré sur Vie		

International career
1988-1989	France U18	1	(0)
1989–1990	France U19	3	(2)
1990	France U21	5	(0)

Managerial career
- 2001–2002: Vendée Poiré sur Vie (player-manager)
- 2002–2013: Les Herbiers
- 2013–2014: Marseille (U19)
- 2014–2016: Marseille B
- 2016: Marseille (assistant)
- 2017: LOSC Lille (assistant)
- 2018–2019: Caen B
- 2020: Niort (assistant)
- 2020–2023: Toulouse (U19)
- 2023-2024: Laval (head of academy)
- 2024-: Al-Ittihad (assistant)
- * Club domestic league appearances and goals

Thomas Fernandez (born 3 August 1970) is a French football manager and former professional football player.

He was a U21 international for France and to the 1990 Toulon Tournament.
