= Christophe Lowinsky =

Martiniquais footballer

Personal information
- Date of birth: 5 May 1991 (age 35)
- Place of birth: Martinique
- Position: Defender

Team information
- Current team: Luzenac

Senior career*
| Years | Team | Apps | (Gls) |
| –2011 | RC Rivière-Pilote | | |
| 2011–2012 | OM B | | |
| 2013–2016 | ES Pennoise | 25+ | (3+) |
| 2016 | San Lorenzo (Paraguay) | | |
| 2016–2018 | Montredon - Bonneveine | | |
| 2018– | Luzenac | | |

International career
| 2012 | Martinique | 1 | (0) |
- * Club domestic league appearances and goals

Christophe Lowinsky (born 5 May 1992) is a Martiniquais footballer who plays as a defender for Luzenac.

== Career ==
Lewinsky started his career with OM. In 2012, he received interest from Tottenham. In 2013, he trialed for Sparta. In 2013, Lowinsky signed for French fifth tier side ES Pennoise after trialing for Newcastle in the English Premier League. In 2016, he signed for San Lorenzo (Paraguay) in the Paraguayan second tier. After that, he signed for French tenth tier team Montredon - Bonneveine. In 2018, Lowinsky signed for Luzenac in the French sixth tier. In 2021, he signed for JS Cugnaux.
