= Jimmy Juan =

French footballer (born 1983)

Personal information
- Full name: Jimmy Dominique Jacky Juan
- Date of birth: 10 June 1983 (age 43)
- Place of birth: Valence, Drôme, France
- Height: 1.89 m (6 ft 2 1/2 in)
- Position: Midfielder

Youth career
- 1998–2002: AS Monaco

Senior career*
Years	Team	Apps	(Gls)
2002–2006	Monaco	6	(0)
2005–2006	→ Ipswich Town (loan)	34	(5)
2006–2011	Grenoble	62	(5)
2008	→ Châteauroux (loan)	19	(1)
2011–2012	Chesterfield	7	(1)
2012–2014	Chamois Niortais	8	(0)
2013–2014	→ Fréjus Saint-Raphaël (loan)	13	(0)
Total		149	(12)
- * Club domestic league appearances and goals as of 11:05, 27 June 2014 (UTC)

Jimmy Dominique Jacky Juan (born 10 June 1983) is a French former professional footballer who played as a midfielder.

== Career ==
Juan began his career with AS Monaco and played in a Champions League match against Liverpool in 2004 before spending the 2005–06 season on loan at English Championship club Ipswich Town.

He was sent on loan to Châteauroux in 2008, making 19 appearances in total.

In December 2011, Juan signed for Chesterfield on a deal which lasted until the end of the season. He wore the number 22 shirt. Despite scoring on his debut against Leyton Orient he was beset by injury problems during his time with Chesterfield and was released by the club at the end of the 2011–12 season.

On 6 June 2012, he signed for newly promoted French Ligue 2 side Chamois Niortais.

== Career statistics ==
Appearances and goals by club, season and competition
Club	Season	League			National Cup (Note: Includes appearances in Coupe de France and FA Cup)		League Cup (Note: Includes appearances in Coupe de la Ligue and EFL Cup)		Other		Total	
Club	Season	Division	Apps	Goals	Apps	Goals	Apps	Goals	Apps	Goals	Apps	Goals
Monaco	2002–03	Ligue 1	2	0	0	0	1	0	—		3	0
Monaco	2003–04	Ligue 1	1	0	1	0	1	0	0	0	3	0
Monaco	2004–05	Ligue 1	3	0	0	0	0	0	1 (Note: Appearance in UEFA Champions League)	0	4	0
Monaco	2005–06	Ligue 1	0	0	0	0	0	0	0	0	0	0
Monaco	Total		6	0	1	0	2	0	1	0	10	0
Ipswich Town (loan)	2004–05	Championship	0	0	0	0	0	0	0	0	0	0
Ipswich Town (loan)	2005–06	Championship	34	5	1	0	1	0	—		36	5
Ipswich Town (loan)	Total		34	5	1	0	1	0	0	0	36	5
Grenoble	2006–07	Ligue 2	25	3	1	0	1	0	—		27	3
Grenoble	2007–08	Ligue 2	0	0	0	0	0	0	—		0	0
Grenoble	2008–09	Ligue 1	0	0	0	0	0	0	—		0	0
Grenoble	2009–10	Ligue 1	18	1	1	1	1	0	—		20	2
Grenoble	2009–10	Ligue 2	19	1	0	0	1	0	—		20	1
Grenoble	Total		62	5	2	1	3	0	0	0	67	6
Châteauroux (loan)	2008–09	Ligue 2	19	1	1	0	3	0	—		23	1
Chesterfield	2011–12	League One	7	1	0	0	0	0	1 (Note: Appearance in Football League Trophy)	0	8	1
Chamois Niortais	2012–13	Ligue 2	6	0	0	0	1	0	—		7	0
Chamois Niortais	2013–14	Ligue 2	2	0	0	0	0	0	—		2	0
Chamois Niortais	Total		8	0	0	0	1	0	0	0	9	0
Fréjus Saint-Raphaël (loan)	2013–14	Championnat National	13	0	0	0	0	0	—		13	0
Career total			149	12	5	1	10	0	2	0	166	13
