= 2013–14 Championnat National =

Championnat National
- Season: 2013–14
- Promoted: US Orléans; Gazélec Ajaccio
- Relegated: Vannes; ES Uzès Pont du Gard
- Matches: 306

The 2013–14 Championnat National season was the 16th season since its establishment. The previous season's champions were Créteil. The season began on 9 August and ended on 23 May 2013. In the end of the season, Orléans, Luzenac and Gazélec Ajaccio were promoted to Ligue 2.

== Teams ==
=== DNCG rulings ===
The DNCG ruled that Le Mans FC, who was relegated in 2012–13 Ligue 2, was relegated to the Division Honneur due to financial reasons. FC Rouen, who ended as 5th on the 2012–13 Championnat National, was relegated to the Division Honneur due to the club accounting and its debts. Also, CS Sedan Ardennes, who was relegated in 2012–13 Ligue 2, was relegated to the Championnat de France amateur 2 due to its judiciary liquidation.

The teams were replaced by FC Bourg-Péronnas who ended the 15th position, ES Uzès Pont du Gard (16th) and Paris FC (17th). The three teams were supposed to be relegated in the 2012–13 Championnat National, as it had plans to change its number to 18 teams in this division.

=== Stadia and locations ===
| Club | Location | Venue | Capacity |
|---|---|---|---|
| Amiens | Amiens | Stade de la Licorne | 12,097 |
| Boulogne | Boulogne-sur-Mer | Stade de la Libération | 15,004 |
| Bourg-Péronnas | Péronnas | Stade Municipal de Péronnas | 3,500 |
| Carquefou | Carquefou | Stade du Moulin Boisseau | 2,500 |
| Colmar | Colmar | Colmar Stadium | 7,000 |
| Colomiers | Colomiers | Stade Michel Bendichou | 11,000 |
| Dunkerque | Dunkerque | Stade Marcel-Tribut | 4,200 |
| Fréjus | Fréjus | Stade Pourcin | 2,500 |
| Gazélec Ajaccio | Ajaccio | Stade Ange Casanova | 3,200 |
| Le Poiré-sur-Vie | Le Poiré-sur-Vie | Stade de l'Idonnière | 1,950 |
| Luzenac | Luzenac | Stade Paul Fédou | 1,000 |
| Luçon | Luçon | Stade Jean de Mouzon | 7,000 |
| Orléans | Orléans | Stade de la Source | 6,000 |
| Paris | Paris | Stade Sébastien Charléty | 20,000 |
| Red Star | Saint-Ouen | Stade Bauer | 10,000 |
| Strasbourg | Strasbourg | Stade de la Meinau | 29,000 |
| Uzès Pont du Gard | Uzès | Stade Pautex | 2,500 |
| Vannes | Vannes | Stade de la Rabine | 8,000 |

== League table ==
| Pos | Team | Pld | W | D | L | GF | GA | GD | Pts | Promotion or Relegation |
|---|---|---|---|---|---|---|---|---|---|---|
| 1 | Orléans (C, P) | 34 | 17 | 14 | 3 | 46 | 22 | +24 | 65 | Promotion to Ligue 2 |
| 2 | Luzenac (Note: Luzenac were originally promoted to the Ligue 2, but were denied a license. Then they found out they didn’t have a stadium that fitted any requirements, so they were relegated to the Regional 1.) (D, R) | 34 | 17 | 12 | 5 | 51 | 30 | +21 | 63 | Relegation to Regional 1 |
| 3 | Gazélec Ajaccio (P) | 34 | 17 | 9 | 8 | 45 | 27 | +18 | 60 | Promotion to Ligue 2 |
| 4 | Colmar | 34 | 13 | 11 | 10 | 37 | 39 | −2 | 50 | |
| 5 | Dunkerque | 34 | 12 | 14 | 8 | 35 | 30 | +5 | 50 | |
| 6 | Amiens | 34 | 12 | 13 | 9 | 32 | 24 | +8 | 49 | |
| 7 | Red Star | 34 | 12 | 12 | 10 | 37 | 33 | +4 | 48 | |
| 8 | Carquefou (Note: On 20 Mar 2014, the president of Carquefou declared that the club will not be able to have financial means to continue on the Championnat National in the next season. The club would be sent back to the Regional 1.) (D, R) | 34 | 11 | 14 | 9 | 32 | 30 | +2 | 47 | Relegation to Regional 1 |
| 9 | Paris | 34 | 11 | 13 | 10 | 32 | 27 | +5 | 46 | |
| 10 | Fréjus (Note: Fréjus were penalised two competition points.) | 34 | 12 | 10 | 12 | 35 | 35 | 0 | 44 | |
| 11 | Bourg-Péronnas | 34 | 11 | 10 | 13 | 38 | 45 | −7 | 43 | |
| 12 | Luçon | 34 | 10 | 11 | 13 | 32 | 41 | −9 | 41 | |
| 13 | Le Poiré-sur-Vie | 34 | 11 | 8 | 15 | 37 | 52 | −15 | 41 | |
| 14 | Boulogne | 34 | 11 | 7 | 16 | 36 | 40 | −4 | 40 | |
| 15 | Colomiers | 34 | 10 | 9 | 15 | 39 | 39 | 0 | 39 | |
| 16 | Strasbourg | 34 | 8 | 11 | 15 | 36 | 40 | −4 | 35 | |
| 17 | Vannes (Note: Vannes were penalised three competition points. Then they were not granted a license for the CFA, meaning they have to play in the DSE.) (D) | 34 | 6 | 14 | 14 | 35 | 45 | −10 | 29 | Relegation to DSE |
| 18 | Uzès Pont du Gard (Note: Uzès Pont du Gard were relegated to the Regional 1 because they had no money and they were bankrupt.) (D, R) | 34 | 5 | 8 | 21 | 25 | 61 | −36 | 23 | Relegation to Regional 1 |

Rules for classification: 1) points; 2) goal difference; 3) number of goals scored.
(C) Champions; (D) Disqualified; (P) Promoted; (R) Relegated

== Results ==
| Home \ Away | AMI | BOU | BPE | CQF | COL | CLM | DUN | FRE | GAZ | LPV | LUZ | LUÇ | ORL | PAR | RSFC | RCS | UZE | VAN |
|---|---|---|---|---|---|---|---|---|---|---|---|---|---|---|---|---|---|---|
| Amiens | | 0–0 | 0–1 | 2–2 | 1–0 | 0–1 | 1–1 | 2–0 | 4–2 | 3–0 | 0–0 | 0–0 | 0–2 | 1–0 | 2–0 | 1–1 | 0–0 | 2–0 |
| Boulogne | 1–2 | | 5–0 | 1–0 | 2–1 | 3–0 | 0–0 | 2–1 | 2–0 | 3–2 | 0–2 | 0–2 | 1–2 | 0–0 | 0–1 | 1–0 | 2–2 | 2–5 |
| Bourg-Péronnas | 1–1 | 2–1 | | 0–1 | 4–2 | 2–1 | 1–0 | 0–0 | 1–3 | 1–1 | 0–2 | 2–2 | 0–2 | 0–0 | 1–1 | 2–1 | 1–1 | 4–0 |
| Carquefou | 1–2 | 2–1 | 0–1 | | 1–0 | 1–1 | 1–0 | 0–1 | 1–2 | 4–1 | 1–1 | 2–0 | 1–1 | 1–2 | 2–1 | 1–0 | 2–1 | 1–0 |
| Colmar | 3–1 | 1–0 | 4–3 | 0–0 | | 1–2 | 2–0 | 0–0 | 1–1 | 0–0 | 3–1 | 2–0 | 0–2 | 0–3 | 0–2 | 2–1 | 3–1 | 2–2 |
| Colomiers | 1–1 | 1–2 | 2–2 | 0–1 | 1–1 | | 1–2 | 0–0 | 1–1 | 4–0 | 0–0 | 5–1 | 0–1 | 0–2 | 0–0 | 2–1 | 1–2 | 3–1 |
| Dunkerque | 2–1 | 1–0 | 0–1 | 1–0 | 0–0 | 4–2 | | 0–0 | 0–2 | 1–0 | 1–1 | 1–0 | 0–0 | 0–0 | 2–0 | 0–0 | 1–0 | 4–1 |
| Fréjus | 1–0 | 1–1 | 2–3 | 0–0 | 5–1 | 1–4 | 1–3 | | 1–0 | 3–0 | 1–2 | 2–1 | 0–2 | 0–1 | 3–2 | 1–0 | 3–1 | 2–0 |
| Gazélec Ajaccio | 2–0 | 0–1 | 3–1 | 4–1 | 1–1 | 1–0 | 2–1 | 1–0 | | 3–1 | 0–1 | 2–0 | 0–0 | 1–0 | 2–1 | 2–0 | 1–0 | 0–0 |
| Le Poiré-sur-Vie | 0–0 | 2–1 | 1–0 | 1–1 | 0–0 | 2–1 | 1–1 | 2–1 | 0–1 | | 0–3 | 0–0 | 0–2 | 1–0 | 1–2 | 1–3 | 5–0 | 2–2 |
| Luzenac | 1–0 | 1–0 | 2–1 | 2–2 | 3–0 | 2–1 | 0–0 | 1–2 | 1–1 | 0–1 | | 1–0 | 3–3 | 1–1 | 1–0 | 2–1 | 4–0 | 2–0 |
| Luçon | 0–0 | 1–0 | 1–1 | 0–0 | 0–1 | 0–2 | 1–1 | 1–3 | 1–0 | 3–0 | 0–2 | | 2–2 | 2–2 | 1–0 | 1–0 | 3–2 | 3–2 |
| Orléans | 0–0 | 3–1 | 1–0 | 2–0 | 1–1 | 0–0 | 1–0 | 1–1 | 1–1 | 4–1 | 0–1 | 2–1 | | 2–0 | 0–0 | 1–1 | 3–2 | 0–0 |
| Paris | 0–0 | 1–1 | 2–1 | 0–0 | 0–1 | 1–0 | 2–2 | 0–0 | 0–0 | 1–2 | 2–1 | 0–1 | 1–2 | | 2–3 | 2–0 | 3–0 | 1–1 |
| Red Star | 1–0 | 0–1 | 0–0 | 1–1 | 0–1 | 1–0 | 2–2 | 0–0 | 2–1 | 2–1 | 4–2 | 1–1 | 2–0 | 0–0 | | 0–0 | 3–0 | 1–0 |
| Strasbourg | 0–1 | 1–1 | 3–2 | 1–1 | 1–2 | 2–0 | 3–0 | 2–0 | 1–1 | 1–3 | 2–2 | 1–1 | 1–0 | 0–2 | 2–2 | | 2–0 | 2–0 |
| Uzès Pont du Gard | 0–3 | 1–0 | 0–1 | 0–0 | 0–0 | 0–1 | 1–2 | 1–0 | 0–3 | 2–3 | 1–1 | 4–2 | 0–1 | 0–1 | 2–1 | 0–0 | | 1–1 |
| Vannes | 0–1 | 2–0 | 0–0 | 0–0 | 0–1 | 0–1 | 2–2 | 0–0 | 2–1 | 0–1 | 2–2 | 0–0 | 1–1 | 3–0 | 1–1 | 3–2 | 4–0 | |

Legend: Blue = home team win; Yellow = draw; Red = away team win.

== Top goalscorers ==
| Rank | Player | Club | Goals |
|---|---|---|---|
| 1 | (Cameroon) Andé Dona Ndoh | Luzenac AP | 22 |
| 2 | (France) Gaëtan Laborde | Red Star | 14 |
| 2 | (France) Wilfried Louisy-Daniel | Orléans | 14 |
| 2 | (France) Karl Toko Ekambi | Paris FC | 14 |
| 3 | (Senegal) Famara Diedhiou | GFC Ajaccio | 13 |
| 4 | (France) Sacha Clémence | USJA Carquefou | 11 |
| 4 | (France) Mouaad Madri | USL Dunkerque | 11 |
| 4 | (France) Kevin Lefaix | Red Star | 11 |
| 5 | (France) Hervé Bazile | Poiré-sur-Vie | 10 |
| 5 | (France) Idriss Ech-Chergui | Luzenac AP | 10 |
| 6 | (France) Emmanuel Bourgaud | Poiré-sur-Vie | 9 |
| 6 | (France) Lakhdar Boussaha | FC Bourg-Péronnas | 9 |
| 6 | (France) Mathieu Scarpelli | Fréjus | 9 |
| 6 | (France) Moussa Marega | Amiens SC | 9 |

Source: Official Goalscorers' Standings

== Attendances ==
| # | Club | Average |
|---|---|---|
| 1 | Strasbourg | 10,289 |
| 2 | Amiens | 5,538 |
| 3 | Orléans | 2,548 |
| 4 | Vannes | 2,327 |
| 5 | Colmar | 2,022 |
| 6 | Boulogne | 1,666 |
| 7 | Vendée Poiré | 1,660 |
| 8 | Red Star | 1,543 |
| 9 | Gazélec | 1,435 |
| 10 | Dunkerque | 1,415 |
| 11 | Bourg-Péronnas | 1,397 |
| 12 | Luzenac | 1,132 |
| 13 | Luçon | 1,109 |
| 14 | Carquefou | 1,097 |
| 15 | Étoile | 1,012 |
| 16 | Colomiers | 625 |
| 17 | Uzès | 594 |
| 18 | Paris FC | 511 |
