= 2014–15 Championnat National =

Championnat National
- Season: 2014–15
- Champions: Red Star
- Promoted: Red Star; Paris; Bourg-Péronnas
- Relegated: Le Poiré-sur-Vie; Colomiers; Istres
- Matches: 306
- Goals: 757 (2.47 per match)
- Top goalscorer: Kévin Lefaix; Pape Sané (21 goals each)
- Biggest home win: Red Star 8–0 Chambly (25 April 2015)
- Biggest away win: Istres 0–5 Red Star (19 December 2014)
- Highest scoring: Épinal 3–4 Bourg-Péronnas (19 December 2014) Fréjus 3–4 Red Star (15 May 2015) Marseille-Consolat 3–4 Colmar (22 May 2015)

The 2014–15 Championnat National season was the 17th season since its establishment. The previous season's champions were Orléans.

== Teams ==
=== Stadia and locations ===
Club	Location	Venue	Capacity
Amiens	Amiens	Stade de la Licorne	12,097
Avranches	Avranches	Stade René Fenouillère	800
CA Bastia	Bastia	Stade Armand Cesari	16,000
Boulogne	Boulogne-sur-Mer	Stade de la Libération	15,004
Bourg-Péronnas	Péronnas	Stade Municipal de Péronnas	3,500
Chambly	Chambly	Stade des Marais	1,000
Colmar	Colmar	Colmar Stadium	7,000
Colomiers	Colomiers	Stade Michel Bendichou	11,000
Dunkerque	Dunkerque	Stade Marcel-Tribut	4,200
Épinal	Épinal	Stade de la Colombière	8,000
Fréjus Saint-Raphaël	Fréjus	Stade Pourcin	2,500
Istres	Istres	Stade Parsemain	17,000
Le Poiré-sur-Vie	Le Poiré-sur-Vie	Stade de l'Idonnière	1,950
Luçon	Luçon	Stade Jean de Mouzon	7,000
Marseille-Consolat	Marseille	Stade La Martine	1,990
Paris	Paris	Stade Sébastien Charléty	20,000
Red Star	Saint-Ouen	Stade Bauer	10,000
Strasbourg	Strasbourg	Stade de la Meinau	29,000

== League table ==
Pos	Team	Pld	W	D	L	GF	GA	GD	Pts	Promotion or Relegation
1	Red Star (C, P)	34	21	7	6	68	30	+38	70	Promotion to Ligue 2
2	Paris FC (P)	34	19	9	6	50	28	+22	66	Promotion to Ligue 2
3	Bourg-Péronnas (P)	34	20	6	8	57	25	+32	66	Promotion to Ligue 2
4	Strasbourg	34	19	8	7	50	29	+21	65	
5	Luçon	34	15	13	6	40	25	+15	58	
6	Dunkerque	34	14	10	10	38	31	+7	52	
7	Boulogne	34	13	11	10	49	39	+10	50	
8	Fréjus Saint-Raphaël	34	12	13	9	42	38	+4	49	
9	Avranches	34	12	10	12	42	38	+4	46	
10	Colmar	34	12	9	13	40	44	−4	45	
11	Amiens	34	10	11	13	45	48	−3	41	
12	Le Poiré-sur-Vie (Note: Le Poiré-sur-Vie forfeited their position in the Championnat National for the next season due to financial issues, being sent down two divisions to the CFA 2.) (D, R)	34	10	11	13	36	44	−8	41	Relegation to Championnat de France Amateur
13	Marseille Consolat	34	11	7	16	40	58	−18	40	
14	Chambly	34	9	10	15	42	54	−12	37	
15	CA Bastia	34	6	16	12	32	42	−10	34	
16	Colomiers (Note: Colomiers was docked 1 point for fielding an unlicensed player against CA Bastia.) (R, D)	34	7	10	17	29	50	−21	30	Relegation to Championnat de France Amateur
17	Istres (Note: Istres also forfeited their position in the Championnat National for the next season due to financial issues, being sent down three divisions to the DHR.) (R)	34	4	10	20	27	61	−34	22	Relegation to Division Honneur Régionale
18	Épinal	34	2	9	23	30	73	−43	15	

Source: foot-national.com
Rules for classification: 1) points; 2) head-to-head points; 3) head-to-head goal difference; 4) goal difference; 5) number of goals scored
(C) Champions; (D) Disqualified; (P) Promoted; (R) Relegated

== Results ==
Home \ Away	AMI	AVR	CAB	BOU	BPE	CHA	COL	CLM	DUN	EPI	FSR	IST	LPV	LUÇ	MCO	PAR	RST	RCS
Amiens		0–2	2–2	1–1	0–1	2–1	2–1	2–0	1–2	2–2	1–1	2–1	0–1	2–3	2–0	1–0	3–1	1–1
Avranches	2–0		0–0	0–0	2–1	0–0	3–1	1–0	1–1	0–2	0–1	4–1	1–0	2–1	0–1	1–2	2–4	2–1
CA Bastia	0–0	1–1		3–2	2–2	1–1	0–0	1–0	0–0	1–1	1–1	1–3	2–2	1–0	4–0	0–0	2–3	1–0
Boulogne	2–1	1–0	4–1		1–0	2–0	2–1	2–2	3–0	3–1	0–1	1–0	4–1	1–2	3–1	0–0	1–2	1–2
Bourg-Péronnas	2–0	2–0	1–0	2–0		3–0	1–2	2–0	1–1	3–0	4–0	1–1	1–0	0–1	2–0	0–1	2–1	3–0
Chambly	2–2	0–3	1–1	1–1	2–2		0–0	2–3	3–0	2–1	0–0	4–0	5–0	0–1	4–0	1–2	1–0	2–1
Colmar	1–1	0–3	2–1	3–2	0–2	2–0		1–2	0–1	2–1	1–1	1–0	2–3	0–1	3–2	0–1	0–0	3–3
Colomiers	0–2	4–2	1–1	1–1	0–3	0–2	0–2		1–1	1–0	0–2	1–1	0–1	1–1	0–2	0–1	0–1	1–3
Dunkerque	1–0	1–1	3–0	2–0	0–2	3–1	0–0	0–1		3–1	0–0	2–0	2–0	0–1	2–0	1–1	0–1	0–2
Épinal	2–3	0–2	0–1	0–2	3–4	3–2	1–2	0–0	1–3		1–1	1–1	0–2	0–0	1–3	0–4	2–4	2–2
Fréjus	2–0	2–2	3–1	2–2	0–1	3–0	1–3	1–2	1–1	4–1		1–0	2–1	0–0	0–2	1–1	3–4	0–2
Istres	1–1	2–1	1–1	1–1	1–2	2–3	0–2	1–0	1–2	2–2	2–0		0–0	0–0	1–1	2–3	0–5	0–1
Le Poiré-sur-Vie	0–2	1–1	1–0	1–1	2–2	1–1	0–0	2–2	4–2	3–0	2–2	2–0		0–2	1–2	1–3	0–3	1–0
Luçon	2–1	0–0	2–1	2–0	1–0	1–1	0–0	1–1	0–1	4–0	0–2	3–0	0–0		3–1	1–0	1–1	1–3
Marseille Consolat	3–1	2–0	2–1	2–2	0–3	1–0	3–4	2–3	0–2	1–1	2–0	2–1	0–3	1–1		1–2	0–0	1–1
Paris	3–1	1–0	0–0	1–3	1–1	3–0	2–0	1–1	2–1	2–0	1–3	2–0	1–0	2–2	3–1		1–0	1–0
Red Star	3–3	2–1	2–0	2–0	2–1	8–0	2–0	3–1	1–0	3–0	0–0	4–0	0–0	2–1	1–1	2–1		1–2
Strasbourg	2–1	1–2	1–0	0–0	1–0	2–0	3–1	2–0	0–0	1–0	0–1	4–1	1–0	1–1	3–0	2–1	1–0	

Source: French Football Federation
Legend: Blue = home team win; Yellow = draw; Red = away team win.

== Top goalscorers ==
Rank	Player	Club	Goals
1	(France) Kévin Lefaix	Red Star	21
1	(Senegal) Pape Sané	Bourg-Péronnas	21
3	(France) Oumar Pouye	Amiens	16
4	(France) Vincent Créhin	Avranches	14
5	(Guadeloupe) Richard Socrier	Paris FC	13
6	(France) Jérémy Blayac	Strasbourg	12
6	(France) Mahamadou Diawara	Chambly / Colmar	12
6	(France) Guillaume Heinry	Chambly	12
6	(France) Mathieu Scarpelli	Fréjus Saint-Raphaël	12

Source: Official Goalscorers' Standings

== Attendances ==
#	Club	Average
1	Strasbourg	12,884
2	Amiens	4,971
3	Boulogne	2,094
4	Red Star	1,795
5	Colmar	1,794
6	Bourg-Péronnas	1,623
7	Vendée Poiré	1,607
8	Avranches	1,114
9	Dunkerque	1,100
10	Istres	1,100
11	Luçon	1,026
12	Paris FC	1,026
13	Fréjus	946
14	Chambly	719
15	Colomiers	518
16	Consolat	485
17	Bastia	369
18	Épinal	324
