= Rémi Biancardini =

French footballer (born 1992)

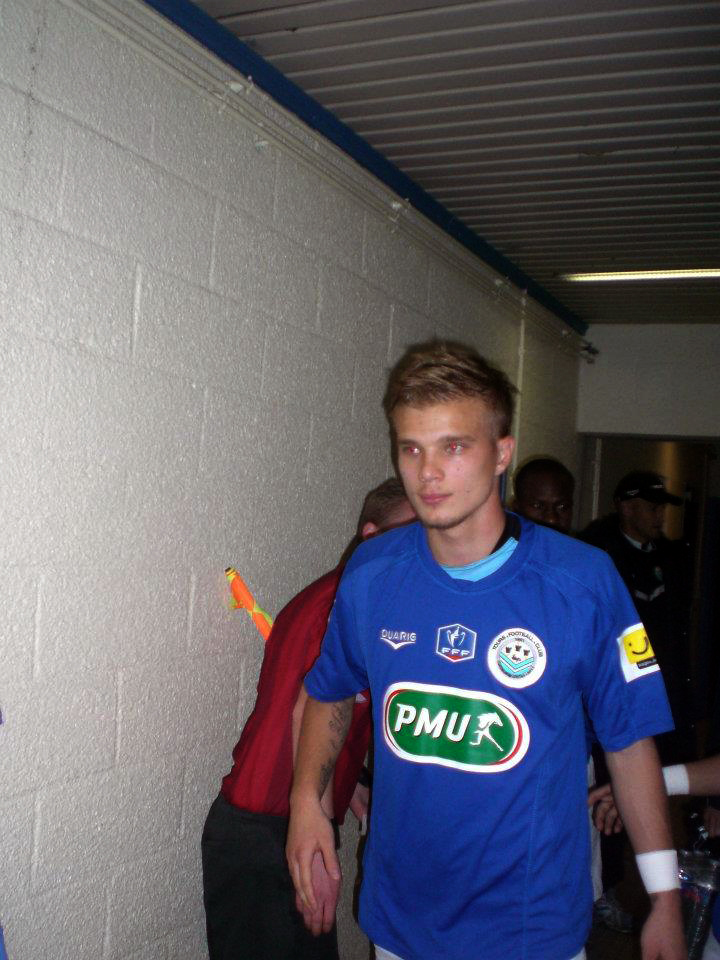
- Rémi Biancardini in 2011

Personal information
- Date of birth: 12 August 1992 (age 34)
- Place of birth: Saint-Martin-d'Hères, France
- Height: 1.84 m (6 ft 0 in)
- Position: Striker

Team information
- Current team: OC Eybens

Youth career
- 2007–2010: Grenoble

Senior career*
Years	Team	Apps	(Gls)
2009–2010	Grenoble B	2	(0)
2010–2014	Tours	47	(4)
2013–2014	→ USJA Carquefou (loan)	9	(0)
2014–2015	Échirolles	5	(0)
2015–2015	Hapoel Rishon LeZion	16	(7)
2015–2016	→ Ironi Ashdod (loan)	7	(0)
2016	Maccabi Herzliya	18	(2)
2016–2017	FC Bourgoin-Jallieu	23	(13)
2017–	OC Eybens	?	(?)
- * Club domestic league appearances and goals as of 11 February 2018

Rémi Biancardini (born 12 August 1992) is a French professional footballer who currently plays as a striker for Olympique Club Eybens.

He started his career in the youth team at Grenoble Foot 38, and made two appearances in the club's reserve team before joining Tours in 2010. Since making his professional debut on 27 May 2011, coming on as a substitute for Song Jin-Hyung in the 0–1 defeat at Sedan, he has played more than 30 first-team matches for the club.
