= Kevin Lefaix =

French footballer (born 1982)

Personal information
- Date of birth: 8 February 1982 (age 44)
- Place of birth: Rennes, France
- Height: 1.82 m (6 ft 0 in)
- Position: Striker

Senior career*
Years	Team	Apps	(Gls)
2000–2001	CPB Bréquigny		
2002–2004	Stade Rennais FC B		
2004–2005	US Saint-Malo		
2005–2009	AS Vitré		
2009–2012	US Orléans	77	(44)
2012–2013	Vendée Poiré-sur-Vie Football	36	(17)
2013–2015	Red Star FC	63	(33)
2016	Royale Union Tubize-Braine	28	(10)
2017–2018	FC Chambly Oise	31	(13)
2018–2020	AS Cannes	29	(12)
- * Club domestic league appearances and goals

Kevin Lefaix (born 8 February 1982) is a French footballer who last plays as a striker for AS Cannes.

== Career ==
Lefaix has played in the French Ligue 2 and in Belgium.
