= Jérôme Lafourcade =

French footballer (born 1983)

Personal information
- Date of birth: 15 January 1983 (age 43)
- Place of birth: Dax, France
- Height: 1.84 m (6 ft 0 in)
- Position: Striker

Senior career*
| Years | Team | Apps | (Gls) |
| 2003–2007 | Montpellier | 96 | (23) |
| 2007–2010 | Troyes | 64 | (21) |
| 2010–2012 | Châteauroux | 47 | (8) |
| 2012–2014 | Chamois Niortais | 45 | (10) |
| 2014 | Luzenac | 0 | (0) |
| 2014–2017 | Mont-de-Marsan | 51 | (13) |
| Total | | 303 | (75) |
- * Club domestic league appearances and goals

Jérôme Lafourcade (born 15 January 1983) is a French former professional footballer who played as a striker for Mont-de-Marsan. He began his professional career with Montpellier and has also had spells with Troyes, Châteauroux and Chamois Niortais.

== Career ==
As a youth, Lafourcade played for JA Dax and Mont-de-Marsan before joining Ligue 1 side Montpellier in 2002 after a successful trial. In the 2002–03 season, he played 15 matches for the reserve team in the CFA, scoring twice. Lafourcade made his senior debut for Montpellier in the 1–0 away win against Bordeaux on 9 August 2003, coming on as a second-half substitute for Jean-Mathieu Descamps. He made his first professional start away at Strasbourg on 20 December 2003 and scored his first goal for Montpellier in the same match. He played a total of 21 matches in the 2003–04 campaign, scoring three times. Montpellier were relegated to Ligue 2 at the end of the season, and Lafourcade went on to make a further 74 league games for the club over the following three seasons. On 5 May 2006, in a 1–1 draw with Bastia he was shown the first red card of his career having received two bookings, after scoring the equalising goal for Montpellier earlier in the match.

Lafourcade signed for then Ligue 2 side Troyes in the summer of 2007 on a three-year contract. He made 13 appearances in the first three months of the season, including a 3–1 away win over Châteauroux in which he scored twice. In November 2007, Lafourcade broke the fifth metatarsal bone in his foot, ruling him out for three months. In fact, he did not play again in the 2007–08 season but went on to play 18 matches the following season as Troyes were relegated to the Championnat National. He made 31 starts in the 2009–10 season and scored 17 goals to help Troyes achieve a third-place finish in the National and subsequent promotion back to Ligue 2 at the first attempt. Lafourcade was offered a new contract by the club at the end of the campaign and was also linked with a move to Strasbourg, but he signed for Châteauroux on 2 August 2010.

Lafourcade spent two seasons with Châteauroux, during which time he made 47 league appearances, 18 of them as a substitute, and scored 8 goals. On 20 June 2012, he joined newly promoted Ligue 2 side Chamois Niortais on a free transfer, signing a one-year deal with an optional extra year at the end of the contract. He went on to play 45 league matches for Niort, scoring 10 goals.

Following the end of his contract with Niort, Lafourcade joined Luzenac in June 2014. However, following the refusal of the club's promotion to Ligue 2 for the 2014–15 season, he left the club in September of the same year. He subsequently returned to his boyhood club Mont-de-Marsan, in the Championnat de France amateur, the following month.

== Career statistics ==
Appearances and goals by club, season and competition
| Club | Season | League | | | Coupe de France | | Coupe de la Ligue | | Total | |
| Club | Season | Division | Apps | Goals | Apps | Goals | Apps | Goals | Apps | Goals |
|---|---|---|---|---|---|---|---|---|---|---|
| Montpellier | 2003–04 | Ligue 1 | 21 | 3 | 2 | 0 | 0 | 0 | 23 | 3 |
| Montpellier | 2004–05 | Ligue 2 | 23 | 7 | 1 | 1 | 4 | 2 | 28 | 10 |
| Montpellier | 2005–06 | Ligue 2 | 28 | 7 | 4 | 4 | 2 | 1 | 34 | 12 |
| Montpellier | 2006–07 | Ligue 2 | 24 | 6 | 5 | 3 | 1 | 1 | 30 | 10 |
| Troyes | 2007–08 | Ligue 2 | 13 | 2 | 0 | 0 | 2 | 0 | 15 | 2 |
| Troyes | 2008–09 | Ligue 2 | 18 | 2 | 2 | 1 | 0 | 0 | 20 | 3 |
| Troyes | 2009–10 | National | 33 | 17 | 3 | 2 | 2 | 3 | 38 | 22 |
| Châteauroux | 2010–11 | Ligue 2 | 27 | 6 | 1 | 0 | 0 | 0 | 28 | 6 |
| Châteauroux | 2011–12 | Ligue 2 | 20 | 2 | 3 | 0 | 0 | 0 | 23 | 2 |
| Chamois Niortais | 2012–13 | Ligue 2 | 26 | 8 | 1 | 0 | 0 | 0 | 27 | 8 |
| Chamois Niortais | 2013–14 | Ligue 2 | 19 | 2 | 2 | 2 | 0 | 0 | 21 | 4 |
| Mont-de-Marsan | 2014–15 | CFA | 16 | 1 | 0 | 0 | 0 | 0 | 16 | 1 |
| Mont-de-Marsan | 2015–16 | CFA | 22 | 8 | 3 | 2 | 0 | 0 | 25 | 10 |
| Mont-de-Marsan | 2016–17 | CFA | 13 | 4 | 0 | 0 | 0 | 0 | 13 | 4 |
| Total | | | 303 | 75 | 27 | 15 | 11 | 7 | 341 | 97 |
