= Emmanuel Bourgaud =

French professional footballer (born 1987)

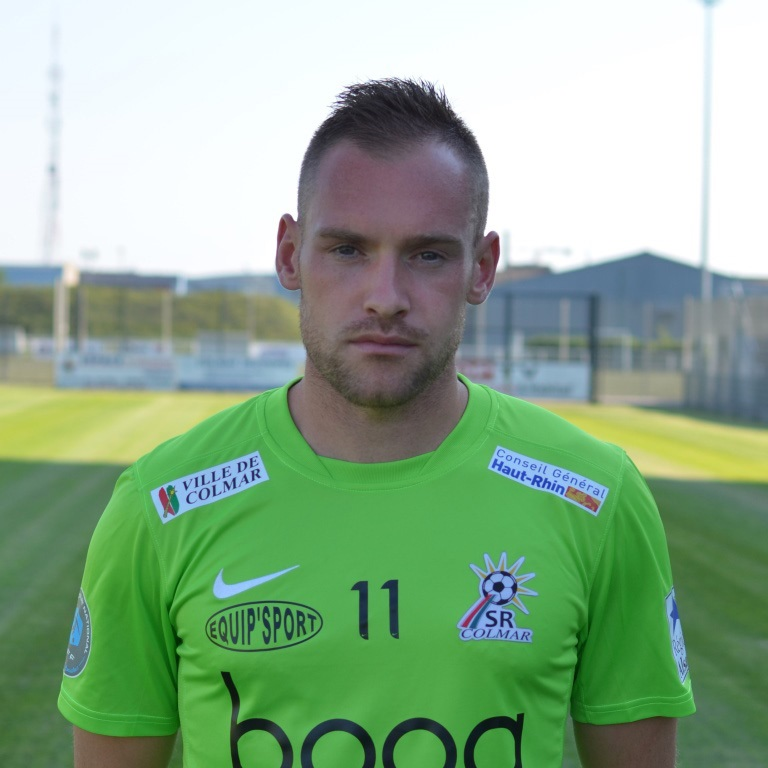
- Bourgaud in 2014

Personal information
- Full name: Emmanuel Bourgaud
- Date of birth: 25 October 1987 (age 39)
- Place of birth: Angers, France
- Height: 1.79 m (5 ft 10 in)
- Position: Midfielder

Team information
- Current team: Saumur
- Number: 24

Youth career
- 1998–2005: Angers

Senior career*
Years	Team	Apps	(Gls)
2005–2011	Angers	64	(2)
2011	→ Créteil (loan)	17	(1)
2011–2014	Le Poiré-sur-Vie	98	(18)
2014–2015	Colmar	26	(4)
2015–2018	Amiens	79	(9)
2018–2020	Red Star	32	(1)
2020–2022	Les Herbiers VF	33	(6)
2022–	Saumur	14	(3)
- * Club domestic league appearances and goals as of 20:12, 17 January 2023 (UTC)

Emmanuel Bourgaud (born 25 October 1987) is a French professional footballer who plays for Olympique Saumur FC as a midfielder.

== Career ==
Bourgaud began his career with Angers in 2005, where he made 51 appearances in Ligue 2, the second tier of the French football league system. He spent time on loan with Créteil in 2011, before being transferred to Vendée Poiré sur Vie later in the year. He scored a late second goal in a 2–1 away win against Reims, to promote Amiens in the 2016–17 Ligue 2.
