= Mehdi Khalis =

Footballer (born 1989)

Personal information
- Date of birth: 6 January 1989 (age 37)
- Place of birth: Les Lilas, France
- Height: 1.98 m (6 ft 6 in)
- Position: Defender

Team information
- Current team: Olympic Safi
- Number: 5

Senior career*
Years	Team	Apps	(Gls)
- Angers B
2010–2011	Falkirk	7	(1)
2011–2012	Drancy	17	(0)
2012–2013	Chamois Niortais	6	(0)
2013–2018	FUS de Rabat	87	(15)
2018–2019	Muaither		
2019–	Olympic Safi	6	(1)

International career
	Morocco U21	10	(0)
2011	Morocco U23	4	(0)
- * Club domestic league appearances and goals as of 18:05, 21 November 2019 (UTC)

Mehdi Khalis (born 6 January 1989) is a professional footballer who plays as a defender for Olympic Safi. Born in England, he represented Morocco internationally at youth levels.

== Career ==
Born in Les Lilas, France, Khalis began his football career at Angers B before joining Falkirk in the Scottish First Division in the 2010–11 season. He made his debut for the club, coming on as a 90th-minute substitute, as the game eventually went to penalty shootout, in a 3–1 loss against Stirling Albion in the first round of the Scottish League Cup. Two weeks later on 7 August 2010, Khalis made his league debut for Falkirk, starting a match and played 61 minutes before being substituted, in a 1–0 win against Dunfermline Athletic. On 26 October 2010, he scored his first goal for the club, in a 2–1 loss against Aberdeen in the quarter-finals of the Scottish League Cup. At the end of the 2010–11 season, Khalis made ten appearances and scoring once in all competitions. Following this, he was released by Falkirk.

After being released by Falkirk, Khalis joined JA Drancy in the Championnat de France amateur. During the 2011–12 season, he played 17 league matches for the French amateur side. On 6 June 2012, he signed for newly promoted Ligue 2 club Chamois Niortais. He made eight appearances in total during the 2012–13 campaign. Khalis was subsequently told in the summer of 2013 that he was not part of manager Pascal Gastien's plans, and in September that year he joined Moroccan club FUS Rabat on a free transfer, signing a three-year contract.

Born in Les Lilas, France, Khalis has represented Morocco internationally at under-21 and under-23 levels.
