= Nicolas Cloarec =

French professional footballer (born 1977)

Personal information
- Full name: Nicolas Cloarec
- Date of birth: 24 July 1977 (age 49)
- Place of birth: Concarneau, France
- Height: 1.68 m (5 ft 6 in)
- Position: Midfielder

Senior career*
Years	Team	Apps	(Gls)
1995–1996	Caen	0	(0)
1996–2002	Lorient	118	(2)
2002–2005	Clermont Foot	64	(0)
2005–2007	Concarneau	23+	(0+)

Managerial career
- 2009–2018: Concarneau
- 2019: Vitré
- * Club domestic league appearances and goals

Nicolas Cloarec (born 24 July 1977) is a French former professional footballer who played as a central midfielder. He was most recently the manager of Championnat National 2 side Vitré.

Cloarec started his career at Caen but failed to make a senior appearance for the club. He joined Lorient in 1996 and went on to play more than 100 matches in Ligue 1 and Ligue 2 during a six-year spell. In 2002, Cloarec signed for Clermont Foot, where he made 64 league appearances. He ended his career with a spell at Concarneau before his retirement in 2007.

In July 2009, Cloarec was appointed as manager of his former club Concarneau. He managed the club for almost nine years, during which time he oversaw promotions from Championnat de France Amateur 2 in 2011 and Championnat de France Amateur in 2016. On 17 December 2018, after initially announcing a break from his role until the end of the year due to fatigue, the club announced that Cloarec was taking a break from football "to preserve his person".

On 8 July 2019, Cloarec was announced as manager of AS Vitré. He was removed from the role on 22 October 2019, after just nine winless league games.
