= Mamadou Doumbia (footballer, born 1980) =

Ivorian retired football player

Personal information
- Full name: Mamadou Doumbia
- Date of birth: 3 December 1980 (age 45)
- Place of birth: Abidjan, Ivory Coast
- Height: 1.81 m (5 ft 11 in)
- Position: Centre-back

Youth career
- 2000: Académie de Sol Beni

Senior career*
Years	Team	Apps	(Gls)
2000–2006	ASEC Mimosas		
2006–2011	Istres	124	(11)
2011–2013	Le Mans	50	(2)
2013	Al-Arabi Kuwait		
2013–2014	Istres	12	(1)
2014–2016	CA Bastia	49	(2)

International career
2005–2007	Ivory Coast	7	(1)
- * Club domestic league appearances and goals

Mamadou Doumbia (born 3 December 1980) is an Ivorian former professional footballer who played as a defender.

== Career ==
Born in Abidjan, Doumbia began his career with Académie de Sol Beni and was promoted to ASEC Mimosas in winter 1999–2000. In July 2006 he signed for FC Istres while a transfer fee of €350,000 was paid to ASEC Mimosas. After a six-year stint with Istres, he moved to Ligue 2 rivals Le Mans on 22 June 2011. Doumbia become trainer of U23 at national team football.
