= Frédéric Bong =

Cameroonian footballer (born 1987)

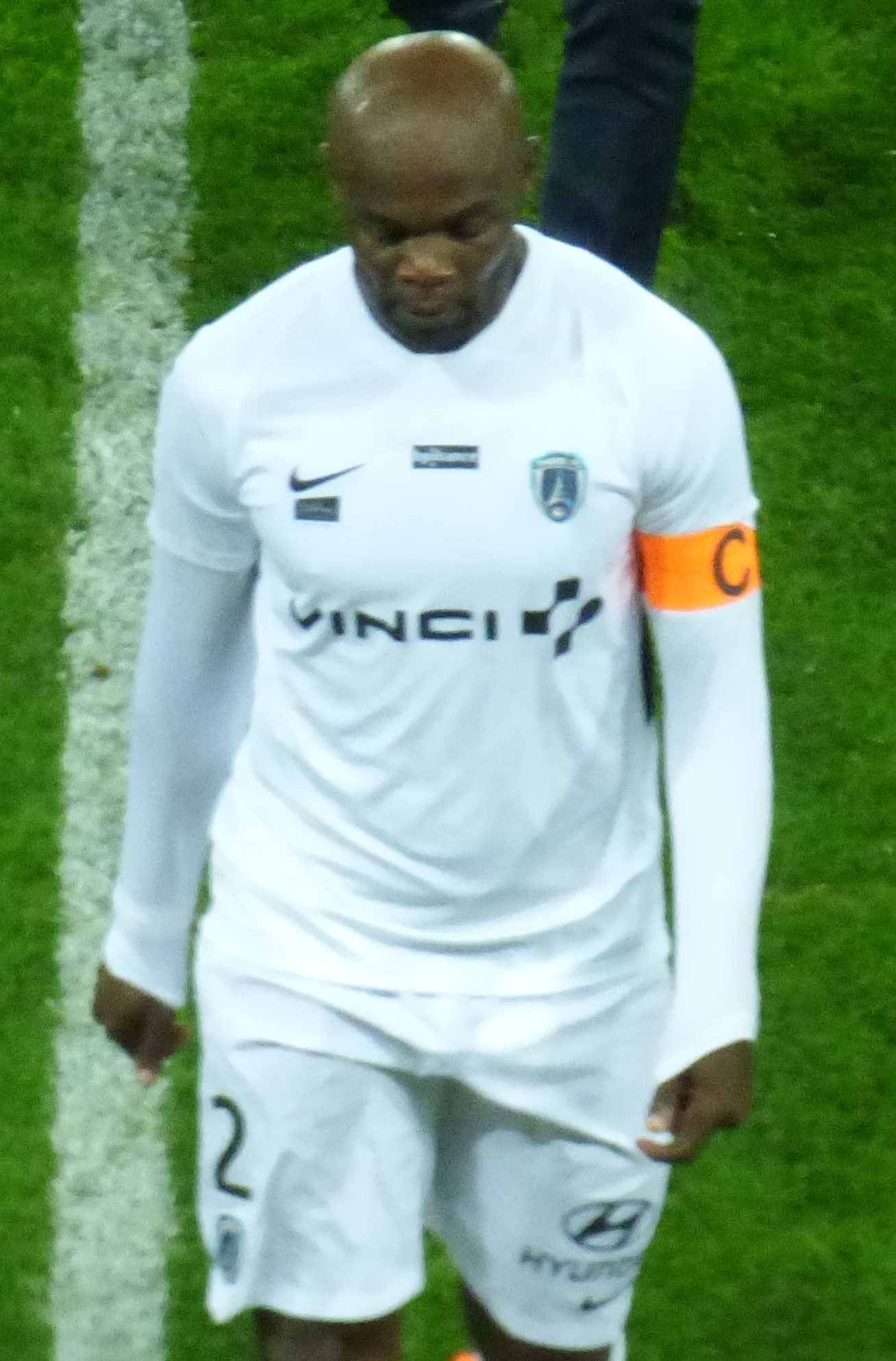
- Bong with Paris FC in 2018

Personal information
- Date of birth: 27 July 1987 (age 39)
- Place of birth: Douala, Cameroon
- Height: 1.87 m (6 ft 2 in)
- Position: Centre-back

Youth career
- 2004–2008: Créteil

Senior career*
Years	Team	Apps	(Gls)
2008–2011	Créteil	81	(4)
2011–2016	Niort	120	(2)
2015	Niort B	1	(0)
2016–2018	Paris FC	71	(3)
2019–2021	Valenciennes	14	(0)
2020–2021	→ SC Lyon (loan)	21	(0)
2021–2022	Echiré Saint-Gelais		
Total		309	(9)

Managerial career
- 2022–2024: Niort B (assistant)
- 2023: Niort B (interim manager)
- 2024–2025: Niort U-14
- * Club domestic league appearances and goals

Frédéric Bong (born 27 July 1987) is a Cameroonian former professional footballer who played as a centre-back.

== Career ==
Bong was born in Douala, Cameroon. He joined US Créteil-Lusitanos in 2004 after being scouted in Italy playing with a Cameroon national youth team. Bong signed his first professional contract in January 2009. Prior to that, he made his debut for the club in November 2008. He went on to make a total of 80 league appearances in three seasons with Créteil. On 26 May 2011, Bong joined Chamois Niortais as their first signing of the summer.

In his first season with the club, Niort won promotion to Ligue 2. He made his Ligue 2 debut in the first match of the 2012–13 season, a 1–1 draw against Clermont. He remained with Niort for five season, four of which were in Ligue 2.

In June 2016, Bong signed a two-year contract with Paris FC in the Championnat National. For the second time he won promotion to Ligue 2, and in the summer of 2018 he was made captain for the 2018–19 season.

In January 2019, Bong signed a 2.5-year contract with Valenciennes. Short of playing time at the club, he moved on loan to SC Lyon in June 2020 until the end of the 2020–21 season.

Ahead of the 2021–22 season, Bong decided to end his professional career and instead joined French amateur club Echiré Saint-Gelais.

== Coaching career ==
During 2022, in the 2022–23 season, Bong started his coaching career at Niort, where he became an assistant coach for the club's B-team under manager Oumar Tchomogo.

On 1 February 2023, Oumar Tchomogo was promoted to manager of the club's first-team, whereupon Bong took over his position as manager of the club's B-team for the remainder of the season. However, in the summer of 2023, prior to the 2023–24 season, Tchomogo took over the B-team again, and Bong reverted to being his assistant coach.

In the 2024–25 season, Bong was the head coach for Niort's U14 team, and in January 2025, he was also the interim manager for the club's women's team. On 10 April 2025, Niort was dissolved due to significant debt.

== Career statistics ==
As of 28 June 2021

Appearances and goals by club, season and competition
Club	Season	League			National cup		League cup		Other		Total	
Club	Season	Division	Apps	Goals	Apps	Goals	Apps	Goals	Apps	Goals	Apps	Goals
Créteil	2008–09	National	17	2	4	0	0	0	0	0	21	2
Créteil	2009–10	National	33	1	2	1	0	0	0	0	35	2
Créteil	2010–11	National	31	1	4	0	0	0	0	0	35	1
Créteil	Total		81	4	10	1	0	0	0	0	91	5
Chamois Niortais	2011–12	National	33	1	4	0	0	0	0	0	37	1
Chamois Niortais	2012–13	Ligue 2	27	1	2	0	2	0	0	0	31	1
Chamois Niortais	2013–14	Ligue 2	25	0	3	0	1	0	0	0	29	0
Chamois Niortais	2014–15	Ligue 2	14	0	3	0	1	0	0	0	18	0
Chamois Niortais	2015–16	Ligue 2	21	0	3	0	1	0	0	0	25	0
Chamois Niortais	Total		120	2	15	0	5	0	0	0	140	2
Chamois Niortais B	2015–16	CFA 2	1	0	—		—		—		1	0
Paris FC	2016–17	National	26	1	0	0	2	0	2 (Note: Appearances in the 2016–17 Championnat National promotion playoffs)	0	30	1
Paris FC	2017–18	Ligue 2	28	1	2	0	0	0	0	0	30	1
Paris FC	2018–19	Ligue 2	17	1	0	0	1	0	0	0	18	1
Paris FC	Total		71	3	2	0	3	0	2	0	78	3
Valenciennes	2018–19	Ligue 2	9	0	0	0	—		0	0	9	0
Valenciennes	2019–20	Ligue 2	5	0	2	0	0	0	0	0	7	0
Valenciennes	Total		14	0	2	0	0	0	0	0	16	0
Valenciennes B	2019–20	National 3	1	0	—		—		—		1	0
SC Lyon (loan)	2020–21	National	21	0	0	0	—		0	0	21	0
Career total			309	9	29	1	8	0	2	0	348	10
