= ES Uzès Pont du Gard =

French football club

Uzès Pont du Gard
- Full name: Entente Sportive Uzès Pont du Gard
- Founded: 2005
- Dissolved: 2015
- Ground: Stade Pautex, Uzès
- Capacity: 2,500
- Chairman: Serge Remon
- Manager: T. Droin
- League: Championnat National
- 2012–13: Championnat National, 16th
- Website: http://www.esupg.com/
Home colours	Away colours

Entente Sportive Uzès Pont du Gard was a French association football club founded in 2005. The club was formed as a result of a merger between two teams; ES Pont du Gard and Gallia Club d'Uzès. They were based in the town of Uzès and their home stadium was the Stade Pautex. In the 2013–14 season, they played in the Championnat National league.

The club was dissolved in August 2015.
