= Rodolphe Roche =

French footballer (born 1979)

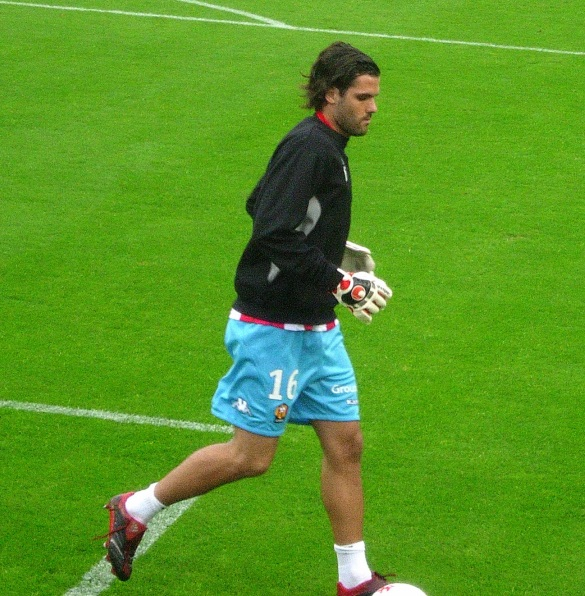
- Roche in 2007

Personal information
- Date of birth: 14 June 1979 (age 47)
- Place of birth: Montluçon, France
- Height: 1.83 m (6 ft 0 in)
- Position: Goalkeeper

Senior career*
Years	Team	Apps	(Gls)
1997–1998	Montluçon		
1998–2005	Châteauroux	112	(0)
2005–2010	Le Mans	33	(0)
2011–2012	Saint-Louis Neuweg	20	(0)
2012–2015	Chamois Niortais	32	(0)
2015–2016	Châteauroux	7	(0)
2015–2016	Châteauroux II	7	(0)
- * Club domestic league appearances and goals

Rodolphe Roche (born 14 June 1979) is a French former professional football who played as a goalkeeper. During his 18-year playing career, he represented Montluçon, Châteauroux, Le Mans, Saint-Louis Neuweg, Chamois Niortais and Châteauroux.

== Career statistics ==
Appearances and goals by club, season and competition
Club	Season	League			Coupe de France		Coupe de la Ligue		Total	
Club	Season	Division	Apps	Goals	Apps	Goals	Apps	Goals	Apps	Goals
Châteauroux	1998–99	Division 2	0	0	0	0	0	0	0	0
Châteauroux	1999–2000	Division 2	2	0	1	0	2	0	5	0
Châteauroux	2000–01	Division 2	3	0	3	0	4	0	10	0
Châteauroux	2001–02	Division 2	35	0	0	0	2	0	37	0
Châteauroux	2002–03	Division 2	36	0	0	0	1	0	37	0
Châteauroux	2003–04	Division 2	12	0	6	0	0	0	18	0
Châteauroux	2004–05	Division 2	24	0	1	0	1	0	26	0
Châteauroux	Total		112	0	11	0	10	0	133	0
Le Mans	2005–06	Ligue 1	3	0	1	0	1	0	5	0
Le Mans	2006–07	Ligue 1	11	0	0	0	2	0	13	0
Le Mans	2007–08	Ligue 1	9	0	2	0	1	0	12	0
Le Mans	2008–09	Ligue 1	6	0	0	0	0	0	6	0
Le Mans	2009–10	Ligue 1	4	0	2	0	1	0	7	0
Le Mans	Total		33	0	5	0	5	0	43	0
Saint-Louis Neuweg	2011–12	CFA2 Group E	20	0	–		–		20	0
Chamois Niortais	2012–13	Ligue 2	27	0	2	0	1	0	30	0
Chamois Niortais	2013–14	Ligue 2	2	0	1	0	1	0	4	0
Chamois Niortais	2014–15	Ligue 2	3	0	2	0	1	0	6	0
Chamois Niortais	Total		32	0	5	0	3	0	40	0
Châteauroux	2015–16	National	7	0	2	0	0	0	9	0
Châteauroux II	2015–16	CFA 2	7	0	–		–		7	0
Career total			211	0	23	0	18	0	252	0
