= Sadio Sankharé =

French footballer (born 1981)

Personal information
- Full name: Sadio Sankharé
- Date of birth: 9 July 1981 (age 45)
- Place of birth: Paris, France
- Height: 1.87 m (6 ft 1 1/2 in)
- Position: Defender

Senior career*
| Years | Team | Apps | (Gls) |
| 2002–2004 | ES Thaon | ? | (?) |
| 2004–2005 | US Raon-l'Étape | 31 | (0) |
| 2005–2007 | Grenoble Foot 38 | 15 | (0) |
| 2007–2009 | Nîmes Olympique | 55 | (1) |
| 2009–2010 | SO Chambéry Foot | 3 | (1) |
| 2010–2011 | Paris FC | 24 | (1) |
| 2011–2012 | Chamois Niortais | 0 | (0) |
- * Club domestic league appearances and goals as of 10 October 2012 (UTC)

Sadio Sankharé (born 9 July 1981) is a French football defender who played a total of 35 matches in Ligue 2 for Grenoble Foot 38 and Nîmes Olympique. He started his career with ES Thaon in the Championnat de France amateur 2 before joining Championnat National side US Raon-l'Étape in 2004. Sankharé spent one season with the club, making 31 league appearances, before moving to Grenoble, where he played 15 Ligue 2 matches during a two-year spell. In 2007, he returned to the National with Nîmes and was an integral part of the squad that won promotion in 2007–08.

After making 20 Ligue 2 appearances the following campaign, Sankharé joined CFA2 club SO Chambéry Foot and played three matches during the 2009–10 season. He then spent a year with Paris FC, before joining Chamois Niortais in the summer of 2011.
