= Pascal Gastien =

French football manager (born 1963)

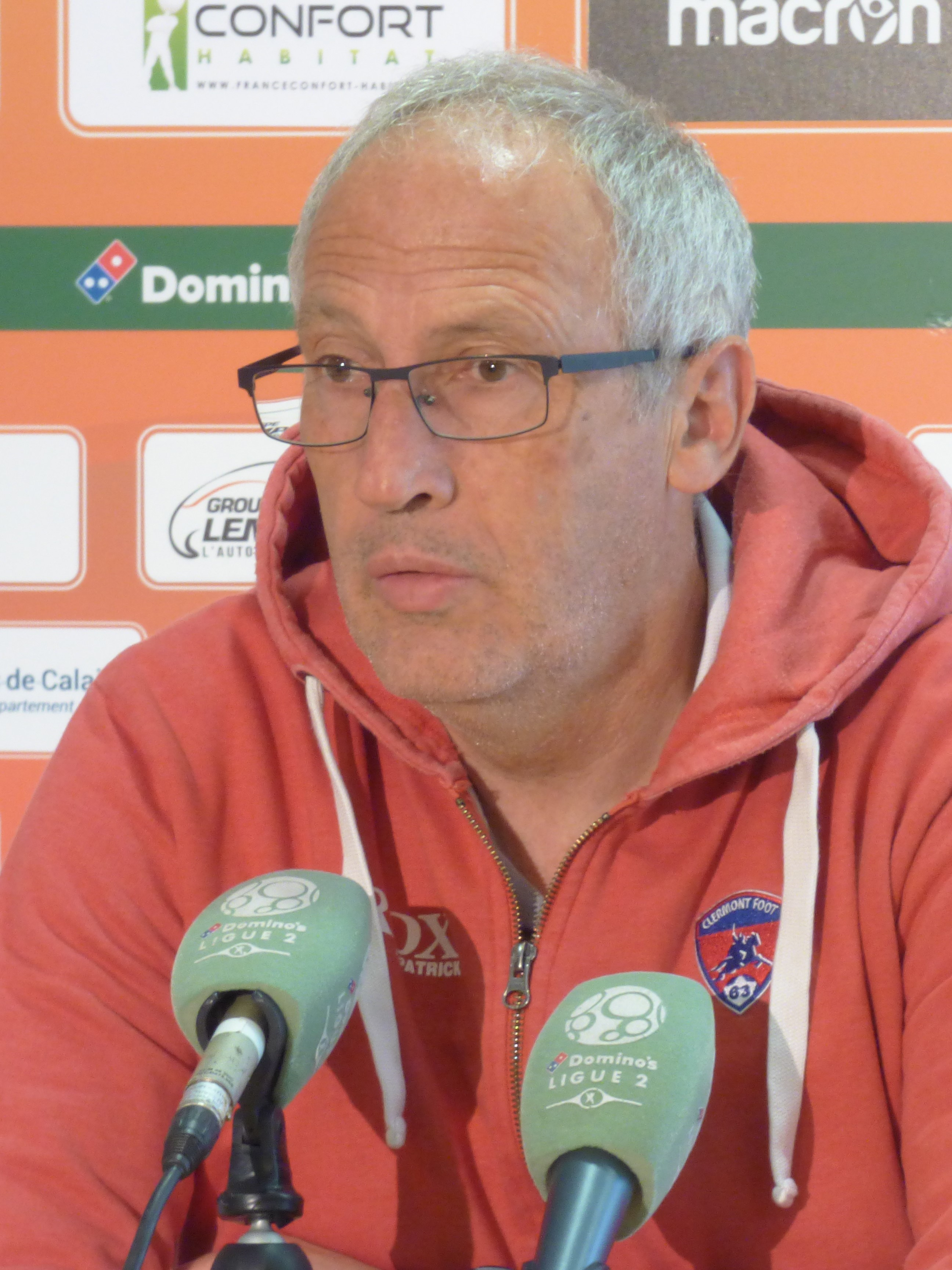
- Gastien as Clermont manager in 2019

Personal information
- Date of birth: 2 December 1963 (age 62)
- Place of birth: Rochefort, France
- Position: Midfielder

Youth career
- 1970–1979: Port-des-Barques
- 1979–1981: Angoulême

Senior career*
Years	Team	Apps	(Gls)
1981–1982	Angoulême	6	(0)
1982–1988	Niort	125	(17)
1988–1989	Marseille	18	(0)
1989–1990	Niort	14	(0)
1990–1993	Nice	61	(1)
1993–1997	Châteauroux	86	(0)
Total		310	(18)

International career
1987–1988	France Olympic	3	(0)

Managerial career
- 1999: Niort (caretaker)
- 2000–2009: Niort (reserves)
- 2005: Niort
- 2009–2014: Niort
- 2014–2015: Châteauroux
- 2016–2017: Clermont (reserves)
- 2017–2024: Clermont
- * Club domestic league appearances and goals

Pascal Gastien (born 2 December 1963) is a French professional football manager and former player who was most recently the head coach of French club Clermont.

== Early life ==
Gastien was born in Rochefort, Charente-Maritime. He is the father of footballer Johan Gastien.

== Club career ==
In his playing days, Gastien played predominantly as a central defensive midfielder. The majority of his playing career was spent in the top two divisions of the French football league system.

=== Angoulême ===
Gastien's career started when he signed his first professional contract as an 18-year-old with then Division 2 side Angoulême. However, he found it difficult to break into the first team set up, playing only six league games, and left after just one season as a professional.

=== Niort ===
In the summer of 1982, Gastien joined then Division 4 side Niort. In the 1983–84 season, the team were promoted to the third division following a third place in Division 4. He went on to feature in most games during the 1984–85 season as the team were winners of their group in the third division, winning a second consecutive promotion, this time to Division 2. Gastien then played a major role two seasons later as the club secured promotion to the top division of French football, Division 1, finishing as runners-up in Division 2 in 1987. His performances for the club in the top-flight attracted the likes of Marseille, whom he signed for in 1988.

=== Marseille ===
Gastien found first team opportunities harder to come by at Marseille, making just 18 league appearances as the club were crowned champions of France and winners of the Coupe de France in the 1988–89 season.

=== Return to Niort ===
In order to play more football, Gastien returned to Niort, who had since been relegated back to Division 2, in the summer of 1989. However, his stay with the club was short-lived as he was sold to Division 1 outfit Nice in the middle of the season.

=== Nice ===
Gastien went on to play for Nice for three-and-a-half seasons, but again found first-team chances in the top-flight limited, making only 61 league appearances in this time. He played in just four league matches in the 1990–91 season as the club were relegated from Division 1. He eventually left Nice in the summer of 1993 and joined then National 1 side Châteauroux.

=== Châteauroux ===
Gastien played a major role in the 1993–94 season as Châteauroux finished top of the National, achieving promotion to Division 2. He enjoyed the next two seasons, playing in the majority of games for Châteauroux. However, in the 1996–97 season, Gastien's final season as a professional, he played a mediocre six matches as the team won the Division 2 championship, gaining promotion to Division 1. In the summer of 1997, Gastien was released by Châteauroux and subsequently retired.

== International career ==
In the qualifying round for the 1988 Summer Olympics in Seoul, Gastien played three games without scoring for France as they failed to qualify for the final tournament, finishing bottom of their group.

== Managerial career ==
=== Niort ===
After retiring from professional football, Gastien turned his hand to management.

In October 1999, Gastien was appointed joint caretaker manager of Niort alongside former Rennes boss René Cédolin, but the pair did not take charge of any league games.

In 2000, Gastien was appointed permanently as head coach of Niort's reserve team.

In January 2005, Gastien took over from Vincent Dufour as manager of the first team, who were struggling in Ligue 2. Unfortunately, Gastien was unable to avoid relegation to the Championnat National, with the team winning just three of the 17 games he was in charge, and at the end of the season, he reverted to being the reserve team coach, whilst Philippe Hinschberger took control of first team duties. Gastien continued to coach the reserves until the summer of 2009.

On 4 June 2009, it was announced that Gastien had been re-appointed as manager of Niort.

Gastien led Niort to win the Championnat de France Amateur during his first full season in charge, thereby returning to the Championnat National at the first attempt.

In the 2010–11 campaign, Gastien led the club to an eleventh place in the third tier; in the 2011 close season, several new players including Jimmy Roye and Julien Ricaud were recruited and the following season, Niort went on to finish as runners-up to Nîmes Olympique thanks to a 1–0 win away at Gazélec Ajaccio on the final matchday. Niort were consequently promoted to Ligue 2, marking the club's return to the professional ranks of French football.

He spent two more years in charge of Niort, guiding the side to a 15th-placed finish in the 2012–13 season, followed by a fifth-place finish a year later.

It was announced on 19 May 2014 that Gastien would not have his contract renewed and would be leaving the club after a fifteen-year association.

=== Châteauroux ===
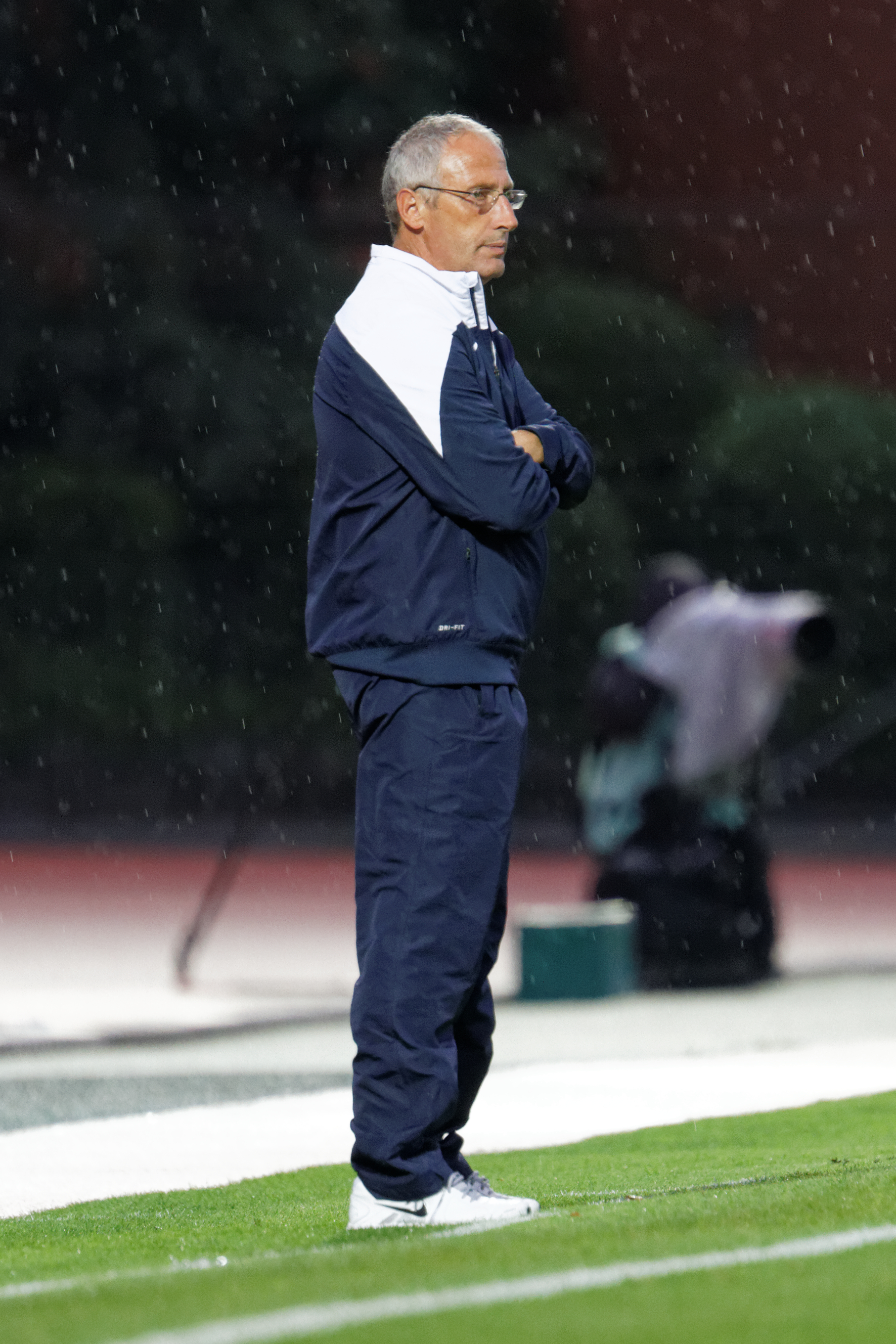
Gastien as Châteauroux manager in 2014

On 4 June 2014, Gastien was appointed as the new manager of his former club as a player, Châteauroux, succeeding Jean-Louis Garcia. However, following a string of poor results, Gastien was relieved of his duties on 9 February 2015.

=== Clermont ===
Gastien was revealed as the new manager of Clermont reserves on 11 May 2016. Gastien became the new manager of the senior team on 1 September 2017 after previous manager Corinne Diacre left two days before on 30 August to take charge of the France women's national team. In the 2020–21 Ligue 2, Gastien led Clermont to finish second in the league, to be promoted to the Ligue 1 for the first time in their history.

Gastien left Clermont at the end of the 2023–24 season.

== Managerial statistics ==
As of match played 19 May 2024

Managerial record by team and tenure
Team	From	To	Record					Ref.
Team	From	To	P	W	D	L	Win %	Ref.
Niort (caretaker)	October 1999	October 1999	0	0	0	0	—	
Niort (reserves)	July 2000	June 2005	132	58	33	41	43.94	
Niort (reserves)	June 2005	June 2009	126	59	34	33	46.83	
Niort	January 2005	June 2005	18	3	8	7	16.67	
Niort	4 June 2009	19 May 2014	191	73	65	53	38.22	
Châteauroux	4 June 2014	9 February 2015	28	6	9	13	21.43	
Clermont (reserves)	11 May 2016	3 September 2017	31	11	7	13	35.48	
Clermont	1 September 2017	19 May 2024	263	97	71	95	36.88	
Total			789	307	227	255	38.91	—

== Honours ==
=== Player ===
Niort

- Division 3 Group Centre-Ouest: 1984–85
- Division 2: 1986–87

Marseille

- Division 1: 1988–89
- Coupe de France: 1988–89

Châteauroux

- National 1 Group B: 1993–94
- Division 2: 1996–97

=== Manager ===
Niort

- Championnat de France Amateur Group C: 2009–10
- Championnat National runner-up: 2011–12

Individual

- Ligue 2 Manager of the Year: 2018–19
