= Julien Ricaud =

French professional footballer (born 1985)

Personal information
- Full name: Julien Ricaud
- Date of birth: 28 January 1985 (age 41)
- Place of birth: Villeneuve-sur-Lot, France
- Height: 1.85 m (6 ft 1 in)
- Position: Midfielder

Team information
- Current team: Avranches
- Number: 7

Senior career*
Years	Team	Apps	(Gls)
2004–2005	Laval	0	(0)
2005–2007	Genêts Anglet	63	(2)
2007–2008	Compiègne	22	(0)
2008–2010	Pau	62	(2)
2010–2013	Niort	94	(1)
2013–2014	Le Poiré sur Vie	22	(1)
2014–	Avranches	61	(1)
- * Club domestic league appearances and goals as of 22 July 2017 (UTC)

Julien Ricaud (born 28 January 1985) is a French professional footballer who plays for Avranches as a defensive midfielder.

After progressing through the youth ranks at Laval, he began his senior career with Championnat de France amateur (CFA) side Genêts Anglet in 2005. Two years later, Ricaud signed for CFA rivals Compiègne, spending one season there before joining Pau. In the summer of 2010, he was signed by newly promoted Championnat National club Chamois Niortais on a free transfer.

Ricaud became an important figure in the Niort team over the following three seasons, often partnering Johan Gastien in the centre of midfield. He made 36 league appearances in the 2011–12 season as the side finished as runners-up in the National, thereby winning promotion to Ligue 2, the second tier of French football. At the end of the 2012–13 season it was announced that Ricaud, along with four other players, would not be re-signing with Niort for the following campaign.
