= Mustafa Durak =

French professional footballer (born 1988)

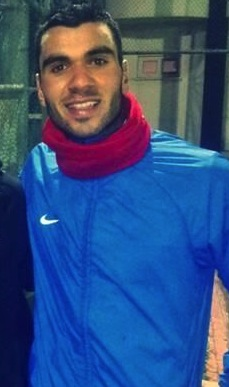

Personal information
- Date of birth: 13 August 1988 (age 38)
- Place of birth: Strasbourg, France
- Height: 1.77 m (5 ft 10 in)
- Position: Right winger

Team information
- Current team: Ergene Velimeşe

Senior career*
Years	Team	Apps	(Gls)
2005–2008	Strasbourg B	32	(5)
2009–2010	Excelsior Virton	27	(8)
2010–2011	Gap	38	(13)
2011–2013	Niort	42	(10)
2013–2016	Gaziantepspor	73	(4)
2016–2017	Adana Demirspor	23	(1)
2017–2020	Boluspor	77	(9)
2020–2021	Manisa	21	(1)
2021–2023	Şanlıurfaspor	47	(3)
2023–	Ergene Velimeşe	0	(0)
- * Club domestic league appearances and goals as of 20 May 2023

Mustafa Durak (born 13 August 1988) is a French professional footballer who plays as a right winger for Turkish club Ergene Velimeşe.

== Career ==
He started his career in the reserve team at his hometown club Strasbourg before moving to Belgium with Excelsior Virton in 2009. He then had a spell with Gap before joining Niort in the summer of 2011. Durak was part of the team that finished as runners-up in the Championnat National in the 2011–12 season, thereby winning promotion to Ligue 2.

It was announced at the end of the 2012–13 campaign that Durak, along with four other players, would not be re-signing with Niort for the following season.

On 6 October 2020, Durak joined Manisa FK.

He holds both French and Turkish nationalities.
