= Luzenac AP =

- Full name: Luzenac Ariège Pyrénées
- Founded: 1936; 90 years ago
- Ground: Stade Paul Fédou, Luzenac
- Capacity: 1,200
- Chairman: Jérôme Ducros
- Manager: Johan Rini
- League: Régional 1
- 2023–24: Régional 1 Group B, 1st of 12 (lost promotion play-off)
- Website: luzenacap.com
Home colours	Away colours

Luzenac AP (French: Luzenac Ariège Pyrénées) is a French football club based in the commune of Luzenac, Ariège. It was founded in 1936. They play at the Stade Paul Fédou, which has a capacity of 1,600. The colours of the club are red and blue.

== History ==
In the 2013–14 season, the club competed in the Championnat National, the third highest level of French football. On 18 April 2014 the club clinched promotion to Ligue 2 for the 2014–15 season, in the hopes of becoming the smallest club to ever compete at the second level of French football. However, the club was ruled to have an inadequate stadium, and so they were not allowed to compete in Ligue 2. They ended up being forced to release their first team players and to use their reserve team squad to play in the seventh tier for 2014-15. However, in 2017, they were promoted to the 2017-18 Championnat National 3, only to be relegated after finishing bottom of their group.

== Current squad ==
As of 28 December 2019. Note: The following players in this squad are either free agents or signed by other teams.

Note: Flags indicate national team as defined under FIFA eligibility rules; some limited exceptions apply. Players may hold more than one non-FIFA nationality.

No.	Pos.	Nation	Player
—	GK	FRA	Adel Taïder
—	GK	FRA	Martin Imbert
—	DF	FRA	Benjamin Trillou
—	DF	FRA	Benjamin Sola
—	DF	FRA	Sébastien Abad
—	DF	FRA	Ousmane Berete
—	DF	FRA	Maxence Guastavino
—	DF	FRA	Assane Karaboualy
—	DF	FRA	Antoine Jouan
—	DF	FRA	Guy-Mel Lasme
—	MF	FRA	Anthony Cauderlier

No.	Pos.	Nation	Player
—	MF	FRA	Cheick Oumar Traoré
—	MF	FRA	Alexandre Boceno
—	MF	FRA	Thomas Lafaille
—	FW	FRA	Sébastien Chinchilla
—	FW	FRA	Yacine Aouladchaib
—	FW	FRA	Quentin Villen
—	FW	FRA	Paul Pinelli
—	FW	FRA	Matthieu Chipot
—	FW	FRA	Colétin Nguala
—	FW	MRI	John Justin
—	DF	MTQ	Christophe Lowinsky

== Honours ==
- Division 4 Group G championship : 1980
- CFA2 Group E championship : 2005
- Midi-Pyrénées DH championship : 1971, 1985, 2000
- CFA Group C championship : 2009
