= 2016–17 Championnat National =

Championnat National
- Season: 2016–17
- Champions: Châteauroux
- Promoted: Châteauroux; Quevilly-Rouen; Paris FC
- Relegated: Épinal; CA Bastia (merged); Sedan; Belfort
- Matches: 306
- Goals: 728 (2.38 per match)
- Top goalscorer: 18 goals (Umut Bozok, Marseille Consolat)
- All statistics correct as of 12:49, 25 May 2017 (UTC).

The 2016–17 Championnat National season was the 19th season since its establishment. The fixtures were announced on 15 July 2016.

== Teams ==
There are 18 clubs in the league, with four promoted teams from Championnat de France Amateur replacing the four teams that were relegated from National following the 2015–16 season. All clubs that secured National status for the season were subject to approval by the DNCG before becoming eligible to participate.

== Team changes ==
As of 14 July 2016, the following teams have mathematically achieved qualification for the 2016–17 season. Evian Thonon Gaillard, who were relegated from Ligue 2, was sent administratively to CFA due to financial troubles. As a result, Épinal were added back to National.

=== To National ===
Promoted from CFA

- Quevilly-Rouen
- Lyon-Duchère
- Pau
- Concarneau

Relegated from Ligue 2

- Paris FC
- Créteil

=== From National ===
Relegated to CFA

- Fréjus Saint-Raphaël

Relegated to 6th tier

- Luçon
- Colmar

Promoted to Ligue 2

- Strasbourg
- Orléans
- Amiens

=== Stadia and locations ===
Location of teams in 2016–17 National

Club	Location	Venue	Capacity
Avranches	Avranches	Stade René Fenouillère	2,000
CA Bastia	Bastia	Stade d'Erbajolo	2,000
Belfort	Belfort	Stade Roger Serzian	5,500
Béziers	Béziers	Stade de Sauclières	12,000
Boulogne	Boulogne-sur-Mer	Stade de la Libération	15,204
Chambly	Chambly	Stade des Marais	2,500
Châteauroux	Châteauroux	Stade Gaston Petit	17,000
Concarneau	Concarneau	Stade Guy Piriou	6,500
Créteil	Créteil	Stade Dominique Duvauchelle	12,050
Dunkerque	Dunkirk	Stade Marcel-Tribut	4,200
Épinal	Épinal	Stade de la Colombière	8,000
Les Herbiers	Les Herbiers	Stade Massabielle	5,000
Lyon-Duchère	Lyon	Stade de Balmont	5,438
Marseille Consolat	Marseille	Stade La Martine	1,990
Paris FC	Paris	Stade Sébastien Charléty	20,000
Pau	Pau	Stade du Hameau	13,819
Quevilly-Rouen	Le Petit-Quevilly	Stade Robert Diochon	12,018
Sedan	Sedan	Stade Louis Dugauguez	24,389

== League table ==
Pos	Team	Pld	W	D	L	GF	GA	GD	Pts	Promotion or Relegation
1	Châteauroux (C, P)	34	16	11	7	43	35	+8	59	Promotion to Ligue 2
2	Quevilly-Rouen (P)	34	15	13	6	50	37	+13	58	Promotion to Ligue 2
3	Paris FC (Note: Paris FC lost the relegation play-off, but were promoted to fill the vacant spot created by the administrative relegation of SC Bastia from Ligue 1 to Championnat National.) (P)	34	15	9	10	30	18	+12	54	Qualification to promotion play-offs
4	Marseille Consolat	34	16	6	12	52	44	+8	54	
5	Chambly	34	14	12	8	42	34	+8	54	
6	Dunkerque	34	15	8	11	51	37	+14	53	
7	Lyon-Duchère	34	14	8	12	40	37	+3	50	
8	Béziers	34	14	8	12	44	41	+3	50	
9	Boulogne	34	13	10	11	47	38	+9	49	
10	Avranches	34	12	10	12	47	46	+1	46	
11	Concarneau	34	13	7	14	38	43	−5	46	
12	Créteil	34	12	6	16	40	49	−9	42	
13	Les Herbiers	34	8	15	11	38	42	−4	39	
14	Pau	34	8	14	12	28	37	−9	38	
15	Épinal (R)	34	8	13	13	33	39	−6	37	Relegation to National 2
16	CA Bastia (D, R)	34	9	9	16	34	53	−19	36	Merged after the season
17	Sedan (R)	34	9	8	17	39	52	−13	35	Relegation to National 2
18	Belfort (R)	34	8	7	19	32	46	−14	31	Relegation to National 2

Source: FFF.fr
Rules for classification: 1) points; 2) goal difference; 3) number of goals scored; 4) head-to-head goal difference; 5) fair play points
(C) Champions; (D) Disqualified; (P) Promoted; (R) Relegated

== Play-offs ==
The 2016–17 season saw the return of a relegation play-off between the 18th-placed Ligue 2 team and the 3rd-placed team in the Championnat National in a two-legged confrontation. The Championnat National team hosted the first game.

23 May 2017
20:45

Paris FC	0–1	Orléans
	Report	Sami 49'

Stade Sébastien Charléty
Referee: Clément Turpin

28 May 2017
18:00

Orléans	1–0	Paris
Nabab 75'	Report

Stade de la Source
Referee: Frank Schneider

Orléans won 2–0 on aggregate.

== Top scorers ==
As of end of season

Rank	Player	Club	Goals
1	(Turkey) Umut Bozok	Marseille Consolat	18
2	(France) Mehdy Guezoui	Quevilly-Rouen	15
3	(Senegal) Adama Sarr	Les Herbiers	12
3	(Senegal) Malik Tchokounté	Dunkerque	12
5	(France) Christopher Mayulu	Avranches	11
6	(Guadeloupe) Grégory Gendrey	Chambly	10
6	(France) Soufiane Atik	Lyon-Duchère	10
6	(Algeria) Julien López	Marseille Consolat	10
6	(France) Theoson Siebatcheu	Châteauroux	10
10	(Togo) Kalen Damessi	Concarneau	9
10	(Republic of the Congo) Bevic Moussiti-Oko	Dunkerque	9
10	(France) Martin Mimoun	Créteil	9
10	(France) Anthony Schuster	Les Herbiers	9

== Attendances ==
#	Club	Average
1	La Berrichonne	4,585
2	Boulogne	3,752
3	Sedan	3,165
4	Concarneau	1,942
5	Quevilly-Rouen	1,843
6	Dunkerque	1,549
7	Les Herbiers	1,370
8	Créteil	1,183
9	Chambly	960
10	Paris FC	942
11	Pau	926
12	Avranches	848
13	Béziers	845
14	Épinal	805
15	Belfort	739
16	CA Bastia	317
17	Lyon-La Duchère	300
18	Consolat	292
