= Vendée Poiré-sur-Vie Football =

French football club, based in Poiré-sur-Vie

Vendée Poiré-sur-Vie
- Full name: Vendée Poiré-sur-Vie Football
- Founded: 1954; 72 years ago
- Ground: Stade de l'Idonnière, Le Poiré-sur-Vie
- Manager: Loïc Lambert
- League: National 3 Group D
- 2022–23: National 3 Group B, 6th
- Website: www.lepoiresurvie-vendee-football.com
Home colours	Away colours

Vendée Poiré sur Vie Football is a French football club based in Le Poiré-sur-Vie (Vendée).

== History ==
The club, founded in 1954, reached the third tier Championnat National, but suffered administrative relegation in 2015 and again from the fifth-tier Championnat National 3 in 2018 both for financial reasons. The latter relegation placed it in Régional 2 at the seventh tier. In 2020 the club returned to the Championnat National 3, having secured back-to-back promotions.

One of the club's players, Richmond Forson, was called up to represent Togo at the 2006 World Cup.

== Current squad ==
As of 16 March 2016.

Note: Flags indicate national team as defined under FIFA eligibility rules; some limited exceptions apply. Players may hold more than one non-FIFA nationality.

No.	Pos.	Nation	Player
—	GK	FRA	Charles Cieslinsky
—	GK	FRA	Rémi Molimard
—	GK	FRA	Brian Picart
—	DF	FRA	Ngassa Dollard Wandji
—	DF	FRA	Yannick Moussa
—	DF	CMR	Georges Mbassi
—	DF	FRA	Charles Acolatse
—	DF	FRA	Jean Pierre Billong Nguidjol
—	DF	FRA	Anthony Gauvard
—	DF	FRA	Robin Charrier
—	DF	FRA	Francis Liaigre
—	MF	FRA	Yaya Banne
—	MF	FRA	Youssouf Niakaté
—	MF	FRA	Maxence Bertaux

No.	Pos.	Nation	Player
—	MF	FRA	Sonny Boury
—	MF	FRA	Robin Ferrand
—	MF	FRA	Mathieu Roirand
—	MF	FRA	Florian Edouard
—	MF	FRA	Antoine Le Tapissier
—	FW	FRA	Jérôme Tenaud
—	FW	FRA	Julien Moriniere
—	FW	BEL	Kristopher Vicente
—	FW	FRA	Marc Paris
—	FW	TOG	Claude Koutob
—	FW	FRA	Timothée Férand
—	FW	FRA	David Charif
—	FW	CIV	Moustapha Traoré
—	FW	FRA	Yacine Ghazi
