= 2012–13 Tours FC season =

Tours
2012–13 season
- President: Frédéric Sebag
- Head coach: Bernard Blaquart
- Stadium: Stade de la Vallée du Cher
- Ligue 2: 10th
- Coupe de la Ligue: 2nd Round
- Coupe de France: Seventh Round
- Top goalscorer: League: Prince Oniangué; Bryan Bergougnoux (9); All: Prince Oniangué; Bryan Bergougnoux (9)
Home colours	Away colours

Tours Football Club (pronounced [tuʁ]; commonly referred to as simply Tours) is a French association football club based in Tours, the capital city of the Indre-et-Loire department. The club play in Ligue 2, the second level of French football.

Tour finished the season in 10th place in Ligue 2.

== Squad ==
As of 11 July 2012. Note: Flags indicate national team as defined under FIFA eligibility rules; some limited exceptions apply. Players may hold more than one non-FIFA nationality.

No.	Pos.	Nation	Player
1	GK	FRA	Benjamin Leroy
3	DF	FRA	Xavier Tomas
4	DF	FRA	Nicolas Seguin
5	DF	FRA	Wilfried Moimbé
6	MF	GLP	Thomas Gamiette
7	MF	CGO	Prince Oniangue
8	MF	CIV	Yacoub Meite
9	FW	SVK	Erik Pačinda (on loan from Kosice)
10	FW	CIV	Christian Kouakou
11	FW	FRA	Jean-Bryan Boukaka
13	FW	FRA	Jérémy Blayac
14	FW	TUN	Mohamed Ali Ghariani
15	DF	FRA	Thomas Fontaine

No.	Pos.	Nation	Player
16	GK	FRA	Benjamin Bertrand
17	MF	FRA	Rémi Biancardini
18	DF	FRA	Stéphane Tritz
19	FW	FRA	Bryan Bergougnoux
20	MF	FRA	Billy Ketkeophomphone
21	DF	FRA	Teddy Kayombo
22	DF	FRA	Léo Schwechlen
23	MF	FRA	Xavier Chavalerin
24	DF	FRA	Clément Fabre
25	MF	FRA	Pascal Berenguer (on loan from Nancy)
26	DF	FRA	Alexandre Castro
28	DF	FRA	Julien Cétout
29	FW	FRA	Charly Dutournier
30	GK	FRA	Brice Maubleu
33	MF	FRA	Jean-Baptiste Gerard

== Competitions ==
=== Ligue 2 ===
==== League table ====
Pos	Team	Pld	W	D	L	GF	GA	GD	Pts
8	Nîmes	38	17	7	14	52	42	+10	58
9	Auxerre	38	13	10	15	51	53	−2	49
10	Tours	38	12	13	13	40	49	−9	49
11	Arles-Avignon	38	10	16	12	36	48	−12	46
12	Lens	38	9	18	11	39	53	−14	45

Source: Ligue 2
Rules for classification: 1) points; 2) goal difference; 3) number of goals scored.

==== Results summary ====
Overall								Home						Away					
Pld	W	D	L	GF	GA	GD	Pts	W	D	L	GF	GA	GD	W	D	L	GF	GA	GD
38	12	13	13	40	49	−9	49	9	6	4	25	17	+8	3	7	9	15	32	−17

Last updated: 24 May 2013.
Source: Ligue 2

==== Results by round ====
Round	1	2	3	4	5	6	7	8	9	10	11	12	13	14	15	16	17	18	19	20	21	22	23	24	25	26	27	28	29	30	31	32	33	34	35	36	37	38
Ground	A	H	A	H	A	H	A	H	A	H	A	A	H	A	H	A	H	A	H	A	H	A	H	A	H	A	H	A	H	H	A	H	A	H	A	H	A	H
Result	L	D	L	L	L	W	D	D	W	W	D	L	W	D	W	L	D	D	L	L	W	L	W	L	W	D	D	D	D	W	L	W	W	L	D	D	W	L
Position	20	20	20	20	20	19	20	20	16	13	16	16	13	15	12	13	13	11	12	14	11	15	12	13	11	11	12	11	11	11	11	11	9	10	10	10	10	10

Source: Ligue 2
A = Away; H = Home; W = Win; D = Draw; L = Loss

==== Matches ====
30 July 2012 1	Monaco	4–0	Tours	Fontvieille, Monaco
20:20	Carrasco 30'; Raggi 37'; Touré 38'; Germain 44'	Summary	Schwechlen (yellow card) 31'; Blayac (yellow card) 38' (yellow-red card) 48'	Stadium: Stade Louis II; Attendance: 6,075; Referee: Hakim Ben El Hadj

3 August 2012 2	Tours	2–2	Niort	Tours
20:30	Rémi Biancardini 20'; Diego (yellow card) 53'; Charly Dutournier 69'; Meite (yellow card) 85'; Fabre (yellow card) 88'	Summary	Gastien (yellow card) 36'; Roye 48'; Durak 61'; Diaw (yellow card) 69'	Stadium: Stade de la Vallée du Cher; Attendance: 3,854; Referee: Christian Guillard

10 August 2012 3	Dijon	1–0	Tours	Dijon
18:45	Florent Mollet (yellow card) 47'; Baradji (yellow card) 54'; Benjamin Corgnet 71'; Malouda (yellow card) 90+3'	Summary	Thomas Fontaine (yellow card) 33'	Stadium: Stade Gaston Gérard; Attendance: 8,165; Referee: Thomas Léonard

17 August 2012 4	Tours	0–2	Nantes	Tours
18:45		Summary	Đorđević 64', 69'; Pancrate (yellow card) 75'	Stadium: Stade de la Vallée du Cher; Attendance: 4,568; Referee: Alexandre Perreau Niel

24 August 2012 5	Châteauroux	3–0	Tours	Châteauroux
18:45	Jeannot 35'; Nestor 76'; Guerriero (yellow card) 84'; Marcel Essombé 90'	Summary	Schwechlen (yellow card) 47'; Gamiette (yellow card) 61'; Thomas Fontaine (yellow card) 73'; Oniangue (yellow card) 75'	Stadium: Stade Gaston Petit; Attendance: 5,331; Referee: Frank Schneider

31 August 2012 6	Tours	3–0	Auxerre	Tours
18:45	Blayac (yellow card) 34' (goal) 74' (pen.); Rémi Biancardini (yellow card) 86'; Ghariani (yellow card) 89'	Summary	Mandjeck (yellow card) 43' (yellow-red card) 72'; Cyriaque Rivieyran (yellow card) 45+1'; Coulibaly (yellow card) 72'	Stadium: Stade de la Vallée du Cher; Attendance: 4,145; Referee: Christian Guillard

14 September 2012 7	Clermont	1–1	Tours	Clermont-Ferrand
18:45	Bayod 68'; Saïss (yellow card) 80'	Summary	Moimbé (yellow card) 32'; Blayac 45+1'; Berenguer (yellow card) 52'; Stéphane Tritz (yellow card) 76'	Stadium: Stade Gabriel Montpied; Attendance: 2,878; Referee: Sébastien Desiage

21 September 2012 8	Tours	1–1	Sedan	Tours
18:45	Blayac 4'	Summary	Marcq (yellow card) 34'; Diallo 47' (yellow card) 53'; Boli (yellow card) 53'; Reset (yellow card) 87'	Stadium: Stade de la Vallée du Cher; Attendance: 3,150; Referee: Cédric Cotrel

29 September 2012 9	Caen	0–1	Tours	Caen
14:00	Agouazi (yellow card) 57'	Summary	Thomas Fontaine (yellow card) 12'; Gamiette 52'	Stadium: Stade Michel d'Ornano; Attendance: 7,689; Referee: Thomas Léonard

5 October 2012 10	Tours	0–1	Nîmes	Tours
18:45	Bergougnoux 90'	Summary	Sidibé (red card) 21'; Salehaddine Sbai (yellow card) 66'	Stadium: Stade de la Vallée du Cher; Attendance: 3,811; Referee: Stéphane Jochem

19 October 2012 11	Laval	2–2	Tours	Laval
18:45	Lebouc 4' (pen.); Gimbert 47'	Summary	Ghariani (yellow card) 33'; Bergougnoux (yellow card) 71' (goal) 90'; Blayac 89'	Stadium: Stade Francis Le Basser; Attendance: 3,598; Referee: Dominique Julien

26 October 2012 12	Istres	4–1	Tours	Fos-sur-Mer
18:45	de Préville 17'; Bru 42'; Chafik 74'; Ba 81'	Summary	Stéphane Tritz (yellow card) 47'; Oniangue 49'; Blayac (yellow card) 75'	Stadium: Stade Parsemain; Attendance: 2,464; Referee: Frank Schneider

2 November 2012 13	Tours	2–0	Le Mans	Tours
18:45	Blayac 42' (pen.) (yellow card) 55'; Gamiette (yellow card) 82'; Bergougnoux 88'	Summary	Thomas (yellow card) 70'; Zito (yellow card) 78'; Baby (yellow card) 82'; Thomert (yellow card) 88'	Stadium: Stade de la Vallée du Cher; Attendance: 5,130; Referee: Abdelali Chaoui

9 November 2012 14	Guingamp	0–0	Tours	Guingamp
18:45	Charly Charrier (yellow card) 66'; Yatabaré (yellow card) 89'; Argelier (red card) 90'	Summary	Stéphane Tritz (yellow card) 63'	Stadium: Stade du Roudourou; Attendance: 6,670; Referee: Johan Hamel

23 November 2012 15	Tours	2–1	Gazélec Ajaccio	Tours
18:45	Oniangue 17'; Fabre (yellow card) 53'; Bergougnoux 54'; Benjamin Leroy (yellow card) 70'; Berenguer (yellow card) 72'; Moimbé (yellow card) 73'; Ghariani (yellow card) 90+1'	Summary	Bocognano (red card) 39'; Colloredo 90+2'	Stadium: Stade de la Vallée du Cher; Attendance: 3,447; Referee: Hakim Ben El Hadj

30 November 2012 16	Le Havre	3–0	Tours	Le Havre
18:45	Geoffrey Malfleury 7'; Rivière 18'; Bonnet (yellow card) 41'; Mesloub (yellow card) 43'; Ba 90+1'	Summary	Schwechlen (yellow card) 43'; Moimbé (yellow card) 57'; Berenguer (yellow card) 64'	Stadium: Stade Océane; Attendance: 7,161; Referee: Cedric Cotrel

11 December 2012 17	Tours	0–0	Lens	Tours
20:55	Oniangue (yellow card) 20'; Gamiette (yellow card) 65'	Summary	Sow (yellow card) 44'; Baal (yellow card) 51'; Demont (yellow card) 61'	Stadium: Stade de la Vallée du Cher; Attendance: 4,350; Referee: Yohann Rouinsard

14 December 2012 18	Arles-Avignon	2–2	Tours	Avignon
18:45	Ben Saada 34'; Soro (yellow card) 44'; Adbelhamid (yellow card) 53'; Rocchi 54'	Summary	Oniangue 17'; Schwechlen (yellow card) 47'; Gamiette (yellow card) 49'; Kouakou 87'; Moimbé (yellow card) 90+8'	Stadium: Parc des Sports; Attendance: 1,394; Referee: Alexandre Perreau Niel

21 December 2012 19	Tours	1–2	Angers	Tours
18:45	Oniangue 21'; Berenguer (yellow card) 38'; Ketkeophomphone (yellow card) 84'	Summary	Frikeche (yellow card) 12'; Keserü 16'; Couturier (red card) 33'; Malicki (yellow card) 62'; Pierre-Etienne Lemaire 90+1'	Stadium: Stade de la Vallée du Cher; Attendance: 4,073; Referee: Dominique Julien

11 January 2013 20	Niort	3–1	Tours	Niort
20:00	Lafourcade 7' (pen.) 63' (pen.); Konaté 23'; Hébras (yellow card) 90+2'	Summary	Kouakou (yellow card) 7'; Tomas 12' (yellow card) 54'; Fabre (yellow card) 42'	Stadium: Stade René Gaillard; Attendance: 4,020; Referee: Didier Falcone

18 January 2013 21	Tours	3–1	Dijon	Tours
20:00	Oniangue 2', 6'; Tomas (yellow card) 63'; Bergougnoux 68'; Berenguer (yellow card) 69'	Summary	Berenguer 51'; Rémy (yellow card) 67'; Romain Philippoteaux (yellow card) 79'	Stadium: Stade de la Vallée du Cher; Attendance: 3,041; Referee: Florent Batta

25 January 2013 22	Nantes	3–1	Tours	Nantes
20:00	Cichero 25' (yellow card) 56'; Đorđević 54'; Veretout (yellow card) 72'; Pancrate 90+1'	Summary	Bergougnoux (yellow card) 53' (goal) 62' (pen.)	Stadium: Stade de la Beaujoire; Attendance: 10,299; Referee: Sebastien Desiage

1 February 2013 23	Tours	3–1	Châteauroux	Tours
20:00	Oniangue 11'; Bergougnoux (yellow card) 27' (goal) 81'; Schwechlen (yellow card) 37'; Berenguer 53'; Fabre (yellow card) 56'	Summary	Emeric Dudouit (red card) 16'; Jeannot 37' (pen.) (yellow card) 41'	Stadium: Stade de la Vallée du Cher; Attendance: 4,094; Referee: Benoît Millot

8 February 2013 24	Auxerre	3–2	Tours	Auxerre
20:00	Sanogo 23', 70', 90'	Summary	Xavier Chavalerin 7'; Kouakou 9'; Fabre (yellow card) 77'	Stadium: Stade de l'Abbé-Deschamps; Attendance: 4,615; Referee: Frank Schneider

15 February 2013 25	Tours	2–1	Clermont	Tours
20:00	Kouakou (red card) 45+1'; Bergougnoux 55'; Fontaine (yellow card) 59'; Ketkeophomphone 68'; Tomas (yellow card) 90+3'	Summary	Capelle 18'; Saïss (yellow card) 37'; Esor (yellow card) 85' (yellow-red card)	Stadium: Stade de la Vallée du Cher; Attendance: 3,162; Referee: William Lavis

22 February 2013 26	Sedan	1–1	Tours	Sedan, Ardennes
20:00	Boli (yellow card) 16'; Yoann Court (yellow card) 52'; Dielna 69'	Summary	Blayac 14' (yellow card) 52'; Moimbé (yellow card) 40'; Ketkeophomphone (yellow card) 58'	Stadium: Stade Louis Dugauguez; Attendance: 3,734; Referee: Jerome Miguelgorry

1 March 2013 27	Tours	1–1	Caen	Tours
20:00	Cétout 23' (yellow card) 77'; Fabre (yellow card) 87'; Tomas (yellow card) 88'	Summary	Seube (yellow card) 13'; Calvé (yellow card) 45+1'; Duhamel 63' (pen.) (yellow card) 72'; Sorbon (yellow card) 82'	Stadium: Stade de la Vallée du Cher; Attendance: 4,255; Referee: Hakim Ben El Hadj

8 March 2013 28	Nîmes	1–1	Tours	Nîmes
20:00	Benezet 21'; Poulain (yellow card) 65'	Summary	Kouakou (yellow card) 32'; Berenguer 56'; Blayac (yellow card) 65'	Stadium: Stade des Costières; Attendance: 6,404; Referee: Didier Falcone

15 March 2013 29	Tours	1–1	Laval	Tours
20:00	Oniangue 35'; Moimbé (yellow card) 45+1' (yellow-red card)	Summary	Ewolo (yellow card) 30'; Belaud (yellow card) 35'; Viale 78'	Stadium: Stade de la Vallée du Cher; Attendance: 3,502; Referee: Florent Batta

29 March 2013 30	Tours	1–0	Istres	Tours
20:00	Fontaine (yellow card) 20'; Kouakou 54'	Summary	Sainati (yellow card) 38'; Bru (yellow card) 90+2'	Stadium: Stade de la Vallée du Cher; Attendance: 3,116; Referee: Alexandre Perreau Niel

5 April 2013 31	Le Mans	1–0	Tours	Le Mans
20:00	Zhang Jiaqi (yellow card) 61'; Cissé (yellow card) 72'; Mendes 83'	Summary	Tritz (yellow card) 32'; Berenguer (yellow card) 55'	Stadium: MMArena; Attendance: 7,537; Referee: William Lavis

12 April 2013 32	Tours	2–0	Guingamp	Tours
20:00	Bergougnoux 55'; Berenguer 62'; Gamiette (yellow card) 82'; Xavier Chavalerin (yellow card) 89'	Summary	Charrier (yellow card) 22'; Imbula (yellow card) 82'; Mathis (yellow card) 90'; Fauré (yellow card) 90'	Stadium: Stade de la Vallée du Cher; Attendance: 4,072; Referee: Clement Turpin

19 April 2013 33	Gazélec Ajaccio	0–1	Tours	Ajaccio
20:00	Sinapi (yellow card) 39'; Seymand (yellow card) 85'	Summary	Oniangue 86'	Stadium: Stade Ange Casanova; Attendance: 1,714; Referee: Cedric Cotrel

26 April 2013 34	Tours	1–2	Le Havre	Tours
20:00	Touré 59' (o.g.)	Summary	Le Marchand (yellow card) 7'; Riyad Mahrez 19'; Mesloub 41'; Zola (yellow card) 43'; Fontaine (yellow card) 68'; Rivière (yellow card) 71'; Louvion (red card) 88'	Stadium: Stade de la Vallée du Cher; Attendance: 4,022; Referee: Christian Guillard

3 May 2013 35	Lens	0–0	Tours	Lens, Pas-de-Calais
20:00	Saint-Ruf (yellow card) 39'; Bergdich (yellow card) 61'	Summary	Schwechlen (yellow card) 19' (yellow-red card); Bergougnoux (yellow card) 90'	Stadium: Stade Félix-Bollaert; Attendance: 17,308; Referee: Abdelali Chaoui

10 May 2013 36	Tours	0–0	Arles-Avignon	Tours
20:00	Kouakou (yellow card) 40'; Tomas (yellow card) 85'; Cétout (yellow card) 90'	Summary	Quintin (red card) 39'; Cantini (yellow card) 54'	Stadium: Stade de la Vallée du Cher; Attendance: 4,020; Referee: Thomas Léonard

17 May 2013 37	Angers	0–0	Tours	Angers
20:30	Couturier (yellow card) 63'; Fall (yellow card) 67'	Summary	Tomas (yellow card) 27'; Cétout (yellow card) 66'; Ghariani 83'	Stadium: Jean-Bouin Stadium, Angers; Attendance: 10,777; Referee: Benoît Millot

24 May 2013 38	Tours	1–2	Monaco	Tours
20:30	Kouakou 20' (yellow card) 76'; Schwechlen (yellow card) 90+2'	Summary	Rivière 53'; Germain 90'	Stadium: Stade de la Vallée du Cher; Attendance: 11,912; Referee: Johann Hamel

=== Coupe de la Ligue ===
7 August 2012 First Round	Tours	3–3 (a.e.t.) (5–4 p)	Le Havre	Tours
19:45	Gamiette 38' (pen.); Stéphane Tritz (yellow card) 74' (yellow-red card) 113'; Moimbé (yellow card) 77'; Ketkeophomphone 81', 82'	Summary	Geoffrey Malfleury 20', 45+1'; Mesloub (yellow card) 42'; Rivière 49'; Zola (yellow card) 62'	Stadium: Stade de la Vallée du Cher; Attendance: 2,095; Referee: Sébastien Desiage

28 August 2012 Second Round	Metz	1–0	Tours	Metz
20:00	Métanire (yellow card) 6'; Guido Milán (yellow card) 79'; Bussmann 84'	Summary	Thomas Fontaine (yellow card) 15'; Ghariani (yellow card) 24'; Kayombo (yellow card) 88'	Stadium: Stade Saint-Symphorien; Attendance: 6,196; Referee: Abdelali Chaoui

=== Coupe de France ===
18 November 2012 Seventh Round	Fleury-Mérogis	2–1	Tours	Fleury-Mérogis
14:30				Stadium: Stade Auguste Gentelet
