= 2012–13 Coupe de la Ligue =

French League Cup

Tournament details
- Country: France
- Dates: 7 August 2012 – 20 April 2013
- Teams: 44

Final positions
- Champions: Saint-Étienne (1st title)
- Runners-up: Rennes
- UEFA Europa League: Saint-Étienne

Tournament statistics
- Matches played: 43
- Goals scored: 115 (2.67 per match)
- Top goal scorer(s): Romain Alessandrini; Mevlüt Erdinç; Nicolas Haquin; Ibrahima Touré (3 goals)

The 2012–13 Coupe de la Ligue was the 19th edition of the French league cup competition. The competition was organized by the Ligue de Football Professionnel and is open to the 44 professional clubs in France that are managed by the organization. The defending champions were Marseille, who defeated Lyon 1–0 in the 2011–12 edition of the final.

The final was contested on 20 April 2013 at the Stade de France in Saint-Denis. The winner of the competition qualified for the 2013–14 UEFA Europa League and be inserted into the third qualifying round.

== Calendar ==
| Round | First match date | Fixtures | Clubs |
|---|---|---|---|
| First Round | 7 August 2012 | 12 | 44 → 32 |
| Second Round | 28 August 2012 | 6 | 32 → 26 |
| Third Round | 25 September 2012 | 10 | 26 → 16 |
| Round of 16 | 30 October 2012 | 8 | 16 → 8 |
| Quarter-finals | 27 November 2012 | 4 | 8 → 4 |
| Semi-finals | 15 January 2013 | 2 | 4 → 2 |
| Final | 20 April 2013 | 1 | 2 → 1 |

== First round ==
The draw for the opening round of the 2012–13 edition of the Coupe de la Ligue was held on 11 July 2012. The first round featured 24 clubs; the four professional clubs in the Championnat National, the third division of French football, and the 20 clubs in Ligue 2. The matches were played on 7 August 2012.

| 7 August 2012 | Caen | 2–1 | Lens | Caen |
| 18:45 CEST | Agouazi 35'; Nabab 68' | Report | Yahia 31' | Stadium: Stade Michel d'Ornano; Attendance: 4,857; Referee: Sébastien Moreira (Franche-Comté) |

| 7 August 2012 | Tours | 3–3 (a.e.t.) (5–4 p) | Le Havre | Tours |
| 20:00 CEST | Gamiette 38' (pen.); Ketkeophomphone 81', 82' | Report | Malfleury 20', 45+1'; Riviere 49' | Stadium: Stade de la Vallée du Cher; Attendance: 2,095; Referee: Sébastien Desiage (Rhône-Alpes) |
| | Penalties |
| | Rigonato (penalty scored); Ketkeophomphone (penalty scored); Moimbé (penalty scored); Biancardini (penalty scored); Gamiette (penalty scored) | | (penalty scored) Fanchone; (penalty scored) Mahrez; (penalty scored) Nouri; (penalty scored) Fontaine; (penalty missed) Mesloub |

| 7 August 2012 | Laval | 0–0 (a.e.t.) (5–4 p) | Le Mans | Laval |
| 20:00 CEST | | Report | | Stadium: Stade Francis Le Basser; Attendance: 3,604; Referee: Mikael Lesage (Lower Normandy) |
| | Penalties |
| | Viale (penalty scored); Gonçalves (penalty scored); Mimoun (penalty scored); Rose (penalty scored); Gamboa (penalty scored) | | (penalty scored) Derouard; (penalty scored) Momi; (penalty scored) Sanson; (penalty scored) Koné; (penalty missed) Sido |

| 7 August 2012 | Amiens | 1–2 | Auxerre | Amiens |
| 20:00 CEST | Lacourt 55' | Report | Mandjeck 29'; Meïté 48' | Stadium: Stade de la Licorne; Attendance: 2,477; Referee: Amaury Delerue (Aquitaine) |

| 7 August 2012 | Châteauroux | 2–2 (a.e.t.) (2–4 p) | Dijon | Châteauroux |
| 20:00 CEST | Essombé 7'; Orinel 69' (pen.) | Report | K. Koné 12'; Thil 83' | Stadium: Stade Gaston Petit; Attendance: 2,853; Referee: William Lavis (Méditerranée) |
| | Penalties |
| | Neves (penalty missed); Hautcoeur (penalty scored); Jeannot (penalty scored); Orinel (penalty missed) | | (penalty missed) Tavares; (penalty scored) Guerbert; (penalty scored) Mollet; (penalty scored) Thil; (penalty scored) K. Koné |

| 7 August 2012 | Metz | 3–2 | Sedan | Metz |
| 20:00 CEST | Ngbakoto 34'; Bussmann 74'; Sakho 90+3' | Report | Makhedjouf 41'; Diallo 45+3' | Stadium: Stade Municipal Saint-Symphorien; Attendance: 1,779; Referee: Olivier Husset (Centre) |

| 7 August 2012 | Angers | 2–1 (a.e.t.) | Nantes | Angers |
| 20:00 CEST | Socrier 17'; Doré 91' | Report | Veretout 41' (pen.) | Stadium: Stade Jean Bouin; Attendance: 5,310; Referee: Dominique Julien (Upper Normandy) |

| 7 August 2012 | Istres | 1–2 (a.e.t.) | Clermont | Fos-sur-Mer |
| 20:00 CEST | Yahia-Chérif 27' | Report | Pinau 44'; Capelle 110' | Stadium: Stade Parsemain; Attendance: 1,550; Referee: Hakim Ben El Hadj (Rhône-Alpes) |

| 7 August 2012 | Niort | 0–0 (3–2 p) | Boulogne-sur-Mer | Niort |
| 20:00 CEST | | Report | | Stadium: Stade René Gaillard; Attendance: 2,056; Referee: Florent Batta (Méditerranée) |
| | Penalties |
| | Roye (penalty missed); Diaw (penalty missed); Pallois (penalty scored); Hebras (penalty scored); Gastien (penalty scored) | | (penalty missed) Loriot; (penalty scored) Allart; (penalty scored) Oliveira; (penalty missed) Chadili; (penalty missed) Boulenger |

| 7 August 2012 | Nîmes | 1–1 (a.e.t.) (5–6 p) | Monaco | Nîmes |
| 20:00 CEST | Thibault 44' | Report | Barazite 71' | Stadium: Stade des Costières; Attendance: 5,825; Referee: Jean-Charles Cailleux (Picardy) |
| | Penalties |
| | Stošić (penalty scored); Ben Yahia (penalty scored); Parpeix (penalty scored); Robail (penalty scored); Amewou (penalty scored); Benezet (penalty missed) | | (penalty scored) Adriano; (penalty scored) Dumont; (penalty scored) Raggi; (penalty scored) Touré; (penalty scored) Labor; (penalty scored) Mendy |

| 7 August 2012 | Vannes | 3–3 (a.e.t.) (7–8 p) | Gazélec Ajaccio | Vannes |
| 20:00 CEST | Haquin 15', 50', 67' | Report | Mandrichi 28'; Verdier 69' (pen.); Colloredo 81' | Stadium: Stade de la Rabine; Attendance: 1,114; Referee: Wilfried Bien (Rhône-Alpes) |
| | Penalties |
| | Diguiny (penalty scored); Youssouf (penalty scored); N'Diaye (penalty scored); Jarsale (penalty scored); Gaffory (penalty missed); Bonnet (penalty scored); Reydel (penalty scored); Haquin (penalty scored); Ponroy (penalty missed) | | (penalty scored) Bocognano; (penalty missed) Colloredo; (penalty scored) Seymand; (penalty scored) Dufau; (penalty scored) Verdier; (penalty scored) Poggi; (penalty scored) Touré; (penalty scored) Mandrichi; (penalty scored) Maury |

| 7 August 2012 | Arles-Avignon | 1–0 | Guingamp | Avignon |
| 20:00 CEST | Douniama 82' | Report | | Stadium: Parc des Sports; Attendance: 1,285; Referee: Alexandre Perreau Niel (Bourgogne) |

== Second round ==
The draw for the second round of the 2012–13 edition of the Coupe de la Ligue was held on 11 July 2012. The round featured the 12 winners of the first round matches. The matches were contested on 28 August 2012.

| 28 August 2012 | Metz | 1–0 | Tours | Metz |
| 20:00 CEST | Bussmann 84' | Report | | Stadium: Stade Municipal Saint-Symphorien; Attendance: 6,196; Referee: Abdelali Chaoui (Languedoc-Roussillon |

| 28 August 2012 | Clermont | 0–1 | Caen | Clermont-Ferrand |
| 20:00 CEST | | Report | Wague 88' | Stadium: Stade Gabriel Montpied; Attendance: 1,561; Referee: Olivier Husset (Centre) |

| 28 August 2012 | Laval | 0–2 | Angers | Laval |
| 20:00 CEST | | Report | Keserü 46'; Diers 68' | Stadium: Stade Francis Le Basser; Attendance: 4,170; Referee: Alexandre Perreau Niel (Bourgogne) |

| 28 August 2012 | Niort | 1–2 | Monaco | Niort |
| 20:00 CEST | Durak 50' | Report | Touré 2'; Poulsen 47' | Stadium: Stade René Gaillard; Attendance: 6,252; Referee: Benoît Millot (Île-de-France) |

| 28 August 2012 | Gazélec Ajaccio | 1–2 | Arles-Avignon | Ajaccio |
| 20:00 CEST | Romey 87' | Report | Suarez 31'; Douniama 84' | Stadium: Stade Ange Casanova; Attendance: 1,205; Referee: Tony Chapron (Rhône-Alpes) |

| 28 August 2012 | Auxerre | 2–1 | Dijon | Auxerre |
| 20:50 CEST | Hengbart 30'; Jullien 90+2' | Report | Tavares 75' | Stadium: Stade de l'Abbé-Deschamps; Attendance: 5,532; Referee: Wilfried Bien (Rhône-Alpes) |

== Third round ==
The draw for the third round of the 2012–13 edition of the Coupe de la Ligue was held on 29 August 2012. The round featured the six winners of the second round matches and the 14 Ligue 1 clubs that did not qualify for European competition in the 2011–12 season. The matches were contested on 25–26 September 2012.

| 25 September 2012 | Auxerre | 2–0 | Angers | Auxerre |
| 20:00 CEST | Madiba 18'; Makengo 51' (pen.) | Report | | Stadium: Stade de l'Abbé-Deschamps; Attendance: 4,680; Referee: Sébastien Desiage (Rhône-Alpes) |

| 25 September 2012 | Bastia | 3–0 | Metz | Bastia |
| 20:00 CEST | Maoulida 2', 50'; Modeste 50' | Report | | Stadium: Stade Armand Cesari; Attendance: 2,095; Referee: Olivier Thual (Aquitaine) |

| 25 September 2012 | Rennes | 3–2 | Nancy | Rennes |
| 20:50 CEST | Alessandrini 16'; Erdinç 27', 47' | Report | Bakar 14'; Moukandjo 84' | Stadium: Stade de la Route de Lorient; Attendance: 8,458; Referee: Alexandre Castro (Rhône-Alpes) |

| 26 September 2012 | Brest | 2–4 | Nice | Brest |
| 18:00 CEST | Ospina 26' (o.g.); Ayité 54' | Report | Kolodziejczak 10'; Cvitanich 37', 43'; Eysseric 90+2' | Stadium: Stade Francis-Le Blé; Attendance: 10,360; Referee: Mikael Lesage (Lower Normandy) |

| 26 September 2012 | Arles-Avignon | 2–1 | Ajaccio | Avignon |
| 20:00 CEST | Dalé 59'; Draman 90+3' | Report | Faty 86' | Stadium: Parc des Sports; Attendance: 437; Referee: Ruddy Buquet (Picardy) |

| 26 September 2012 | Caen | 0–1 | Toulouse | Caen |
| 20:55 CEST | | Report | Djaló 84' | Stadium: Stade Michel d'Ornano; Attendance: 4,333; Referee: Benoît Bastien (Lorraine) |

| 26 September 2012 | Monaco | 4–2 (a.e.t.) | Valenciennes | Fontvieille |
| 20:55 CEST | Touré 38', 120'; Carrasco 45' (pen.); Ocampos 104' | Report | Danic 5'; Wolf 32' (o.g.) | Stadium: Stade Louis II; Attendance: 4,456; Referee: Phillippe Kalt (Alsace) |

| 26 September 2012 | Sochaux | 3–2 (a.e.t.) | Evian | Montbéliard |
| 20:55 CEST | Boudebouz 32' (pen.); Bakambu 70', 101' | Report | Mongongu 2' (pen.); Khelifa 41' (pen.) | Stadium: Stade Auguste Bonal; Attendance: 5,692; Referee: Bartolomeu Varela (Brittany) |

| 26 September 2012 | Reims | 1–2 | Troyes | Reims |
| 20:55 CEST | Fauvergue 18' | Report | Ngoyi 23'; Yattara 67' | Stadium: Stade Auguste Delaune; Attendance: 6,175; Referee: Lionel Jaffredo (Brittany) |

| 26 September 2012 | Lorient | 1–1 (a.e.t.) (0–3 p) | Saint-Étienne | Lorient |
| 20:55 CEST | Sunu 26' | Report | Brandão 54' | Stadium: Stade du Moustoir; Attendance: 12,521; Referee: Benoît Millot (Île-de-France) |
| | Penalties |
| | Aliadière (penalty missed); Lautoa (penalty missed); Corgnet (penalty missed) | | (penalty scored) Cohade; (penalty scored) Ghoulam; (penalty scored) Mignot |

== Round of 16 ==
The draw for the Round of 16 of the 2012–13 edition of the Coupe de la Ligue was held on 26 September 2012 following the conclusion of the third round matches. The round featured the ten winners of the third round matches and the six Ligue 1 clubs that qualify for European competition in the 2011–12 season. The matches were contested on 30–31 October and 7 November 2012.

| 30 October 2012 | Sochaux | 0–3 | Saint-Étienne | Montbéliard |
| 18:00 CET | | Report | Hamouma 10' (67); Alonso 88' | Stadium: Stade Auguste Bonal; Attendance: 7,244; Referee: Benoît Bastien (Lorraine) |

| 30 October 2012 | Monaco | 1–2 | Troyes | Fontvieille |
| 20:00 CET | Carrasco 26' | Report | Rincón 65'; Othon 81' | Stadium: Stade Louis II; Attendance: 5,103; Referee: Alexandre Castro (Rhône-Alpes) |

| 30 October 2012 | Rennes | 1–0 | Arles-Avignon | Rennes |
| 20:00 CET | Alessandrini 18' | Report | | Stadium: Stade de la Route de Lorient; Attendance: 8,524; Referee: Saïd Ennjimi (Centre) |

| 30 October 2012 | Lille | 1–0 (a.e.t.) | Toulouse | Villeneuve-d'Ascq |
| 20:00 CET | Roux 117' | Report | | Stadium: Grand Stade Lille Métropole; Attendance: 21,653; Referee: Laurent Duhamel (Lower Normandy) |

| 31 October 2012 | Nice | 3–1 | Lyon | Nice |
| 17:00 CET | Eysseric 6' (pen.); Traoré 9'; Civelli 15' | Report | Gomis 7' | Stadium: Stade du Ray; Attendance: 8,466; Referee: Nicolas Rainville (Languedoc-Roussillon) |

| 31 October 2012 | Montpellier | 1–0 | Bordeaux | Montpellier |
| 18:45 CET | Tinhan 61' | Report | | Stadium: Stade de la Mosson; Attendance: 7,339; Referee: Alexandre Castro (Rhône-Alpes) |

| 31 October 2012 | Paris Saint-Germain | 2–0 | Marseille | Paris |
| 20:55 CET | Silva 29' (pen.); Ménez 50' | Report | | Stadium: Parc des Princes; Attendance: 43,753; Referee: Antony Gautier (Nord-Pas-de-Calais) |

| 7 November 2012 | Bastia | 1–0 | Auxerre | Bastia |
| 20:00 CET | Modeste 83' | Report | | Stadium: Stade Armand Cesari; Attendance: 7,282; Referee: Wilfried Bien (Rhône-Alpes) |

== Quarter-finals ==
The draw for the quarterfinals of the 2012–13 edition of the Coupe de la Ligue was held on 31 October 2012 following the conclusion of the Round of 16 matches. The round featured the eight winners of the Round of 16 matches and were contested on 27–29 November 2012.

| 27 November 2012 | Saint-Étienne | 0–0 (a.e.t.) (5–3 p) | Paris Saint-Germain | Saint-Étienne |
| 20:55 CEST | | Report | | Stadium: Stade Geoffroy-Guichard; Attendance: 25,306; Referee: Lionel Jaffredo (Brittany) |
| | Penalties |
| | Cohade (penalty scored); Ghoulam (penalty scored); Brandão (penalty scored); Perrin (penalty scored); Aubameyang (penalty scored) | | (penalty scored) Ibrahimović; (penalty scored) Nenê; (penalty missed) Silva; (penalty scored) Armand |

| 28 November 2012 | Montpellier | 3–2 | Nice | Montpellier |
| 17:00 | Cabella 30'; Herrera 52'; Tinhan 83' | Report | Bosetti 22'; Bauthéac 66' (pen.) | Stadium: Stade de la Mosson; Attendance: 6,658; Referee: Fredy Fautrel (Lower Normandy) |

| 28 November 2012 | Bastia | 0–3 | Lille | Bastia |
| 18:45 | | Report | Bruno 11'; Rodelin 62'; Sidibé 84' | Stadium: Stade Armand Cesari; Attendance: 6,910; Referee: Tony Chapron (Rhône-Alpes) |

| 29 November 2012 | Rennes | 2–1 | Troyes | Rennes |
| 20:55 | Pitroipa 8'; Alessandrini 88' | Report | Jean 23' | Stadium: Stade de la Route de Lorient; Attendance: 7,338; Referee: Jean-Charles Cailleux (Picardy) |

== Semi-finals ==
The draw for the semifinals of the 2012–13 edition of the Coupe de la Ligue was held on 29 November 2012 following the conclusion of the quarter-final matches. The round features the 4 winners of the quarterfinal matches and will be contested on 15 January 2013.

| 15 January 2013 | Saint-Étienne | 0–0 (a.e.t.) (7–6 p) | Lille | Saint-Étienne |
| 20:55 | | Report | | Stadium: Stade Geoffroy-Guichard; Attendance: 23,011; Referee: Clément Turpin (Burgundy) |
| | Penalties |
| | Cohade (penalty scored); Mollo (penalty missed); Perrin (penalty scored); Mayi (penalty scored); Aubameyang (penalty scored); Guilavogui (penalty scored); Clément (penalty scored); Clerc (penalty scored) | | (penalty scored) Chedjou; (penalty scored) Baša; (penalty scored) Bruno; (penalty scored) Rodelin; (penalty missed) Balmont; (penalty scored) Mavuba; (penalty scored) Béria; (penalty missed) Gueye |

| 16 January 2013 | Rennes | 2–0 | Montpellier | Rennes |
| 21:00 | Féret 7'; Erdinç 51' | Report | | Stadium: Stade de la Route de Lorient; Attendance: 28,028; Referee: Stéphane Lannoy (Nord-Pas-de-Calais) |

== Final ==
20 April 2013
21:00 CEST

| Saint-Étienne | 1–0 | Rennes |
|---|---|---|
| Brandão 18' | Report |

Stade de France, Saint-Denis
Attendance: 79,087
Referee: Ruddy Buquet (Picardie)

== See also ==
- 2012–13 Ligue 1
- 2012–13 Ligue 2
- 2012–13 Championnat National
