= List of French football transfers winter 2011 =

This is a list of French football transfers for the 2011 winter transfer window. The winter transfer window opened on 1 January 2011, although a few transfers took place prior to that date, and closed at midnight on 31 January 2011. Only moves involving Ligue 1 and Ligue 2 clubs are listed. Players without a club may join one at any time, either during or in between transfer windows.

== Transfers ==
Date	Name	Moving from	Moving to	Fee
2 September 2010	(France) Guillaume Loriot	(France) Le Mans	(France) Valenciennes	Free
2 September 2010	(France) Elie Dohin	(France) Ajaccio	(France) Châteauroux	Free
4 September 2010	(Ghana) Kamal Issah	(Ghana) Liberty Professionals	(France) Rennes	Undisclosed
6 September 2010	(Brazil) Adeílson	(France) Nice	(France) Istres	Loan
7 September 2010	(France) Seïd Khiter	(France) Valenciennes	(France) Laval	Free
7 September 2010	(France) Stéphen Drouin	(France) Vannes	(France) Troyes	Free
11 September 2010	(France) François Clerc	(France) Lyon	(France) Nice	Free
20 September 2010	(France) Frédéric Biancalani	(France) Metz	(France) Reims	Free
21 September 2010	(Republic of the Congo) David Louhoungou	(Turkey) Kocaelispor	(France) Boulogne-sur-Mer	Free
22 September 2010	(France) Guillaume Moullec	(France) Nantes	(France) Clermont	Free
23 September 2010	(United States) Quentin Westberg	(France) Troyes	(France) Évian	Free
26 September 2010	(France) Laurent Bonnart	(France) Marseille	(France) AS Monaco	Free
27 September 2010	(France) Franck Queudrue	(England) Birmingham City	(France) Lens	Free
28 September 2010	(France) Nicolas Seguin	(France) Lyon	(France) Dijon	Loan
11 November 2010	(Tunisia) Hamed Namouchi	(Germany) SC Freiburg	(France) Grenoble	Free
29 November 2010	(France) Johan Cavalli	(France) Nîmes	(France) Ajaccio	Free
30 November 2010	(Peru) Raúl Fernández	(Peru) Universitario	(France) Nice	Undisclosed
15 December 2010	(France) Rod Fanni	(France) Rennes	(France) Marseille	Undisclosed
23 December 2010	(France) Mathieu Duhamel	(France) Troyes	(France) Metz	Loan
27 December 2010	(Slovakia) Ján Novák	(Slovakia) Košice	(France) Tours	Loan
28 December 2010	(France) David Bellion	(France) Bordeaux	(France) Nice	Loan
28 December 2010	(Benin) Mickaël Poté	(France) Nice	(France) Le Mans	Loan
1 January 2011	(France) Ronan Le Crom	Unattached	(France) Nancy	Free
2 January 2011	(France) Yohan Hautcoeur	Unattached	(France) Le Mans	Free
2 January 2011	(South Korea) Jung Jo-Gook	(South Korea) Seoul	(France) Auxerre	Free
3 January 2011	(Panama) Luis Mejia	(Uruguay) Fénix	(France) Toulouse	Loan
3 January 2011	(France) Grégory Proment	Unattached	(France) Caen	Free
3 January 2011	(Togo) Razak Boukari	(France) Lens	(France) Rennes	€5m
3 January 2011	(Cameroon) Jules Goda	(France) Bastia	(France) Marseille	Free
4 January 2011	(Argentina) Diego Gómez	(France) Montluçon	(France) Angers	Free
7 January 2011	(France) Benjamin Psaume	(France) Arles-Avignon	(France) Troyes	Free
8 January 2011	(Slovenia) Ažbej Jug	(Slovenia) Interblock	(France) Bordeaux	Undisclosed
11 January 2011	(France) Henri Saivet	(France) Bordeaux	(France) Angers	Loan
11 January 2011	(France) Kévin Malaga	(France) Auxerre	(France) Nice	Free
11 January 2011	(Guinea) Bobo Baldé	(France) Valenciennes	(France) Arles-Avignon	Free
13 January 2011	(France) Yannis Salibur	(France) Lille	(France) Boulogne	Free
16 January 2011	(France) Rémi Fournier	Unattached	(France) Châteauroux	Free
20 January 2011	(France) Jérémy Blayac	(France) Boulogne	(France) Tours	Undisclosed
24 January 2011	(Netherlands) John Verhoek	(Netherlands) Den Bosch	(France) Rennes	€500k
24 January 2011	(Norway) Alexander Ødegaard	(Norway) Viking	(France) Metz	Free
24 January 2011	(Brazil) Cláudio Caçapa	Unattached	(France) Évian	Free
25 January 2011	(France) Jordan Cuvier	(France) Jura Sud	(France) Rennes	Undisclosed
25 January 2011	(France) Grégory Lacombe	(France) Montpellier	(France) AS Monaco	Loan
25 January 2011	(France) Livio Nabab	(France) Caen	(France) Laval	Loan
26 January 2011	(France) Maxime Brillault	(Belgium) Charleroi	(France) Vannes	Free
26 January 2011	(Ivory Coast) Lamine Diarrassouba	(Romania) Braşov	(France) Nîmes	Free
26 January 2011	(Senegal) Dieng Cheikh Abass	(Hungary) Budapest Honvéd	(France) Nîmes	Loan
27 January 2011	(Mali) Mahamadou Diarra	(Spain) Real Madrid	(France) AS Monaco	Undisclosed
28 January 2011	(Senegal) Manuel Sène	(France) Nîmes	(France) Istres	Free
28 January 2011	(Honduras) Georgie Welcome	(Honduras) Motagua	(France) AS Monaco	Loan
28 January 2011	(Niger) Ouwa Moussa Maazou	(France) Bordeaux	(France) AS Monaco	Loan
28 January 2011	(France) Quentin Othon	(France) Strasbourg	(France) Nantes	Loan
28 January 2011	(France) Steeven Langil	(France) Auxerre	(France) Valenciennes	Loan
29 January 2011	(Nigeria) John Utaka	(England) Portsmouth	(France) Montpellier	Undisclosed
30 January 2011	(France) Bryan Bergougnoux	(Italy) Lecce	(France) Châteauroux	Undisclosed
30 January 2011	(France) Gilles Sunu	(England) Arsenal	(France) Lorient	Loan
30 January 2011	(France) Frédéric Duplus	(France) Sochaux	(France) Vannes	Loan
31 January 2011	(Brazil) André	(Ukraine) Dynamo Kyiv	(France) Bordeaux	Loan
31 January 2011	(France) Yohann Rivière	(France) Vannes	(France) Le Havre	Free
31 January 2011	(Cameroon) Benjamin Moukandjo Bilé	(France) Nîmes	(France) AS Monaco	Undisclosed
31 January 2011	(Togo) Jonathan Ayité	(France) Nîmes	(France) Brest	Undisclosed
31 January 2011	(Guinea) Amara Karba Bangoura	Unattached	(France) Vannes	Free
31 January 2011	(France) Romain Rocchi	(Israel) Hapoel Tel Aviv	(France) Arles-Avignon	Free
31 January 2011	(France) Yoric Ravet	(France) Grenoble	(France) Saint-Étienne	Undisclosed
31 January 2011	(France) Diallo Guidileye	(France) Troyes	(France) Brest	Undisclosed
31 January 2011	(Gabon) Pierre-Emerick Aubameyang	(Italy) Milan	(France) Saint-Étienne	Loan
31 January 2011	(Togo) Serge Gakpé	(France) AS Monaco	(France) Nantes	Undisclosed
31 January 2011	(Argentina) Alejandro Alonso	(France) AS Monaco	(France) Saint-Étienne	Free
31 January 2011	(France) Kévin Bru	(France) Dijon FCO	(France) Boulogne	Free
1 February 2011	(Guinea) Pascal Feindouno	Unattached	(France) AS Monaco	Free

- ^1 Player who signed with club before 1 January officially joined his new club on 1 January 2011, while player who joined after 1 January joined his new club following his signature of the contract.
