= 2012–13 OGC Nice season =

OGC Nice
2012–13 season
- President: Jean-Pierre Rivère
- Head coach: Claude Puel
- Stadium: Stade Municipal du Ray
- Ligue 1: 4th
- Coupe de France: Round of 32
- Coupe de la Ligue: Quarter-finals
- Top goalscorer: League: Darío Cvitanich (19); All: Darío Cvitanich (21)
- Biggest win: Nice 5–0 Valenciennes
- Biggest defeat: Lyon 3–0 Nice
Home colours	Away colours	Third colours

The 2012–13 season is the 86th season in the history of OGC Nice and the club's 11th consecutive season in the top flight of French football. In addition to the domestic league, Nice are participating in this season's edition of the Coupe de France.

== Players ==
=== First-team squad ===
As of 3 March 2013.

Note: Flags indicate national team as defined under FIFA eligibility rules; some limited exceptions apply. Players may hold more than one non-FIFA nationality.

No.	Pos.	Nation	Player
1	GK	COL	David Ospina
2	DF	ARG	Renato Civelli
3	DF	FRA	Timothée Kolodziejczak
4	DF	SRB	Nemanja Pejčinović
5	DF	SEN	Kévin Gomis
6	MF	FRA	Didier Digard (captain)
7	MF	FRA	Fabrice Abriel
8	MF	MLI	Mahamane Traoré
9	FW	FRA	Xavier Pentecôte
10	MF	FRA	Camel Meriem
11	MF	FRA	Éric Bauthéac
12	FW	ARG	Darío Cvitanich
13	MF	FRA	Valentin Eysseric
14	FW	FRA	Jérémy Pied
17	MF	FRA	Kévin Anin

No.	Pos.	Nation	Player
18	FW	FRA	Neal Maupay
19	MF	FRA	Kévin Diaz
20	MF	NED	Luigi Bruins
21	MF	GAB	Lloyd Palun
22	DF	FRA	Julien Berthomier
23	FW	FRA	Alexy Bosetti
24	DF	SEN	Moussa M'Bow
25	DF	HAI	Romain Genevois
26	DF	FRA	Diacko Fofana
27	MF	FRA	Cyril Hennion
28	MF	FRA	Fabien Dao Castellana
29	FW	FRA	Stéphane Bahoken
30	GK	FRA	Joris Delle
33	DF	FRA	Grégoire Puel
40	GK	FRA	Mouez Hassen

== Transfers ==
Date	Name	Moving from	Moving to	Fee
15 June 2012	(France) Eric Bauthéac	Dijon	Nice	Free
25 June 2012	(France) Timothée Kolodziejczak	Lyon	Nice	Free
28 June 2012	(France) Romain Genevois	Tours	Nice	Free
2 July 2012	(France) Joris Delle	Metz	Nice	Free
9 July 2012	(France) François Clerc	Nice	Saint-Étienne	Free

== Pre-season and friendlies ==
Win Draw Loss

== Competitions ==
=== Overall record ===
Competition	First match	Last match	Starting round	Final position	Record							
Competition	First match	Last match	Starting round	Final position	Pld	W	D	L	GF	GA	GD	Win %
Ligue 1	11 August 2012	26 May 2013	Matchday 1	4th	38	18	10	10	57	46	+11	47.37
Coupe de France	6 January 2013	23 January 2013	Round of 64	Round of 32	2	1	1	0	5	4	+1	50.00
Coupe de la Ligue	26 September 2012	28 November 2012	Third round	Quarter-finals	3	2	0	1	9	6	+3	66.67
Total					43	21	11	11	71	56	+15	48.84

Source: Soccerway

=== Ligue 1 ===
==== League table ====
Pos	Team	Pld	W	D	L	GF	GA	GD	Pts	Qualification or relegation
2	Marseille	38	21	8	9	42	36	+6	71	Qualification for the Champions League group stage
3	Lyon	38	19	10	9	61	38	+23	67	Qualification for the Champions League third qualifying round
4	Nice	38	18	10	10	57	46	+11	64	Qualification for the Europa League play-off round
5	Saint-Étienne	38	16	15	7	60	32	+28	63	Qualification for the Europa League third qualifying round (Note: Saint-Étienne, as winner of the 2012–13 Coupe de la Ligue, qualifies for the third qualifying round of 2013–14 UEFA Europa League.)
6	Lille	38	16	14	8	59	40	+19	62	

Source: Ligue 1
Rules for classification: 1) points; 2) goal difference; 3) number of goals scored.

==== Results summary ====
Overall								Home						Away					
Pld	W	D	L	GF	GA	GD	Pts	W	D	L	GF	GA	GD	W	D	L	GF	GA	GD
38	18	10	10	57	46	+11	64	11	5	3	35	17	+18	7	5	7	22	29	−7

Source: Ligue 1

==== Results by round ====
Round	1	2	3	4	5	6	7	8	9	10	11	12	13	14	15	16	17	18	19	20	21	22	23	24	25	26	27	28	29	30	31	32	33	34	35	36	37	38
Ground	H	A	H	A	H	A	H	A	H	A	H	A	H	A	H	A	H	H	A	H	A	H	A	H	A	H	A	H	A	H	A	H	A	H	A	A	H	A
Result	L	D	D	D	W	D	D	L	D	L	W	D	W	W	W	D	W	W	L	W	W	L	W	D	W	W	L	W	L	L	W	W	L	W	W	L	D	W
Position	16	14	15	16	10	11	12	16	15	17	15	15	11	10	9	10	8	5	9	5	4	6	5	6	4	4	5	5	5	6	6	5	6	6	4	5	6	4

Source: Ligue 1
A = Away; H = Home; W = Win; D = Draw; L = Loss

==== Matches ====
11 August 2012 1	Nice	0–1	Ajaccio	Nice
CEST (UTC+2)				Stadium: Stade Municipal du Ray

18 August 2012 2	Valenciennes	0–0	Nice	Valenciennes
CEST (UTC+2)

25 August 2012 3	Nice	2–2	Lille	Nice
CEST (UTC+2)				Stadium: Stade Municipal du Ray

2 September 2012 4	Bordeaux	1–1	Nice	Bordeaux
CEST (UTC+2)

15 September 2012 5	Nice	4–2	Brest	Nice
CEST (UTC+2)				Stadium: Stade Municipal du Ray

22 September 2012 6	Lorient	1–1	Nice	Lorient
CEST (UTC+2)

29 September 2012 7	Nice	2–2	Bastia	Nice
CEST (UTC+2)				Stadium: Stade Municipal du Ray

6 October 2012 8	Reims	3–1	Nice	Reims
CEST (UTC+2)

20 October 2012 9	Nice	1–1	Saint-Étienne	Nice
CEST (UTC+2)				Stadium: Stade Municipal du Ray

27 October 2012 10	Montpellier	3–1	Nice	Montpellier
CEST (UTC+2)

3 November 2012 11	Nice	2–1	Nancy	Nice
CET (UTC+1)				Stadium: Stade Municipal du Ray

11 November 2012 12	Marseille	2–2	Nice	Marseille
14:00 CET (UTC+1)				Stadium: Stade Vélodrome; Attendance: 32,554

18 November 2012 13	Nice	1–0	Toulouse	Nice
CET (UTC+1)				Stadium: Stade Municipal du Ray

24 November 2012 14	Sochaux	0–1	Nice	Montbéliard
CET (UTC+1)				Stadium: Stade Auguste Bonal; Attendance: 13,460

1 December 2012 15	Nice	2–1	Paris Saint-Germain	Nice
CET (UTC+1)				Stadium: Stade Municipal du Ray

8 December 2012 16	Troyes	1–1	Nice	Troyes
CET (UTC+1)				Stadium: Stade de l'Aube; Attendance: 10,162

11 December 2012 17	Nice	1–0	Rennes	Nice
CET (UTC+1)				Stadium: Stade Municipal du Ray

15 December 2012 18	Nice	3–2	Evian	Nice
CET (UTC+1)				Stadium: Stade Municipal du Ray

22 December 2012 19	Lyon	3–0	Nice	Lyon
CET (UTC+1)				Stadium: Stade de Gerland; Attendance: 30,900

13 January 2013 20	Nice	5–0	Valenciennes	Nice
CET (UTC+1)				Stadium: Stade Municipal du Ray

20 January 2013 21	Lille	0–2	Nice	Villeneuve-d'Ascq
CET (UTC+1)				Stadium: Grand Stade Lille Métropole; Attendance: 38,671

27 January 2013 22	Nice	0–1	Bordeaux	Nice
17:00 CET (UTC+1)				Stadium: Stade Municipal du Ray; Attendance: 12,062

2 February 2013 23	Brest	0–2	Nice	Brest
CET (UTC+1)				Stadium: Stade Francis Le Blé; Attendance: 11,273

9 February 2013 24	Nice	1–1	Lorient	Nice
20:00 CET (UTC+1)				Stadium: Stade Municipal du Ray; Attendance: 8,733

16 February 2013 25	Bastia	0–1	Nice	Furiani
20:00 CET (UTC+1)				Stadium: Stade Armand Cesari; Attendance: 14,551

22 February 2013 26	Nice	2–0	Reims	Nice
20:30 CET (UTC+1)				Stadium: Stade Municipal du Ray; Attendance: 8,463

2 March 2013 27	Saint-Étienne	4–0	Nice	Saint-Étienne
20:00 CET (UTC+1)				Stadium: Stade Geoffroy Guichard; Attendance: 24,3589; Referee: Bartolomeu Varela

10 March 2013 28	Nice	2–0	Montpellier	Nice
14:00 CEST (UTC+2)				Stadium: Stade Municipal du Ray; Attendance: 11,642; Referee: Tony Chapron

17 March 2013 29	Nancy	1–0	Nice	Tomblaine
14:00 CET (UTC+1)				Stadium: Stade Marcel Picot; Attendance: 14,949; Referee: Ruddy Buquet

31 March 2013 30	Nice	0–1	Marseille	Nice
14:00 CEST (UTC+2)				Stadium: Stade Municipal du Ray; Attendance: 17,012

6 April 2013 31	Toulouse	3–4	Nice	Toulouse
20:00 CEST (UTC+2)				Stadium: Stadium de Toulouse; Attendance: 11,191

14 April 2013 32	Nice	3–0	Sochaux	Nice
14:00 CEST (UTC+2)				Stadium: Stade Municipal du Ray; Attendance: 10,091

21 April 2013 33	Paris Saint-Germain	3–0	Nice	Paris
21:00 CEST (UTC+2)				Stadium: Parc des Princes; Attendance: 45,369

28 April 2013 34	Nice	3–1	Troyes	Nice
17:00 CEST (UTC+2)				Stadium: Stade Municipal du Ray

5 May 2013 35	Rennes	0–3	Nice	Rennes
14:00 CEST (UTC+2)				Stadium: Stade de la Route de Lorient; Attendance: 16,158

12 May 2013 36	Évian	4–0	Nice	Annecy
17:00 CEST (UTC+2)				Stadium: Parc des Sports

19 May 2013 37	Nice	1–1	Lyon	Nice
15:05 CEST (UTC+2)				Stadium: Stade Municipal du Ray; Attendance: 15,492
Note: The match was originally scheduled for 18 May 2013, but was postponed due to heavy rain.

26 May 2013 38	Ajaccio	0–2	Nice	Ajaccio
21:00 CEST (UTC+2)

=== Coupe de France ===
6 January 2013 Round of 64	Metz	2–3 (a.e.t.)	Nice	Metz
CEST (UTC+2)				Stadium: Stade Saint-Symphorien

23 January 2013 Round of 32	Nice	2–2 (a.e.t.) (2–4 p)	Nancy	Nice
CEST (UTC+2)				Stadium: Stade Municipal du Ray

=== Coupe de la Ligue ===
26 September 2012 Third round	Brest	2–4	Nice	Brest
18:00 CEST (UTC+2)	Ospina 26' (o.g.); Ayité 54'		Kolodziejczak 10'; Cvitanich 37', 43'; Eysseric 90+2'	Stadium: Stade Francis-Le Blé; Attendance: 10,360; Referee: Mikael Lesage

31 October 2012 Round of 16	Nice	3–1	Lyon	Nice
17:00 CET (UTC+1)	Eysseric 6' (pen.); Traoré 9'; Civelli 15'		Gomis 7'	Stadium: Stade Municipal du Ray; Attendance: 8,466; Referee: Nicolas Rainville

28 November 2012 Quarter-finals	Montpellier	3–2	Nice	Montpellier
17:00 CET (UTC+1)	Cabella 30'; Herrera 52'; Tinhan 83'		Bosetti 22'; Bauthéac 66' (pen.)	Stadium: Stade de la Mosson; Attendance: 6,658; Referee: Fredy Fautrel
