= Jean-Bryan Boukaka =

French footballer (born 1992)

Personal information
- Date of birth: 13 March 1992 (age 34)
- Place of birth: Oullins, France
- Height: 1.80 m (5 ft 11 in)
- Position: Striker

Team information
- Current team: Bourgoin-Jallieu

Youth career
- CREPS de Vichy
- 2007–2009: Rennes

Senior career*
| Years | Team | Apps | (Gls) |
| 2009–2012 | Rennes B | 58 | (8) |
| 2012–2013 | Tours | 12 | (0) |
| 2013 | → Boulogne (loan) | 9 | (2) |
| 2013 | → Boulogne B (loan) | 6 | (0) |
| 2013–2014 | Amiens | 6 | (0) |
| 2013–2014 | Amiens B | 10 | (5) |
| 2014 | Rapid București | 1 | (0) |
| 2016–2017 | Dieppe | 25 | (1) |
| 2017–2020 | Saint-Priest | 64 | (12) |
| 2020–2021 | Thonon Evian | 3 | (0) |
| 2021– | Bourgoin-Jallieu | 19 | (4) |
- * Club domestic league appearances and goals as of 23:52, 30 April 2022 (UTC)

Jean-Bryan Boukaka (born 13 March 1992) is a French professional footballer who plays as a striker for Championnat National 3 club Bourgoin-Jallieu.

== Career ==
Boukaka's first club was CREPS de Vichy. He joined Rennes's youth academy in 2007. Boukaka made his debut for the reserve team on 10 April 2010, entering play as an injury-time substitute for Yoan Pivaty in a 2–1 defeat to La Vitréenne. He was given his first start two weeks later in the win over Quevilly, and scored his first goal for Rennes in a 1–1 draw with Ivry on 2 May 2010, scoring the equaliser after coming on in place of Hicham M'Laab. After starting in the last four matches of the 2009–10 season, Boukaka became more involved with the reserve side during the following campaign, making 26 appearances in total in the Championnat de France Amateur, 19 of them as part of the starting line-up. He again scored one goal in the 2010–11 season, scoring the winner in a 3–2 home win over eventual Group D winners Le Poiré-sur-Vie in the penultimate game of the season on 21 May 2011.

Rennes B were relegated to the Championnat de France Amateur 2 for the 2011–12 campaign after finishing bottom of their group at the end of the previous season, and the drop to a lower division saw Boukaka increase his scoring rate. He netted his first of the season in the team's first home game, a 3–1 win against La Suze on 27 August 2011. His next two goals both came in away defeats for Rennes, firstly at Saint-Malo in September and then against Vitré four months later. A regular starter during the second half of the season, Boukaka scored in the draws with Locminé and Sablé-sur-Sarthe before scoring his sixth and final goal of the campaign in a 2–1 win away at Dinan-Léhon on 13 May 2012. The goal proved to be his last for Rennes B, as he was not offered a new contract by the club and was subsequently released in the summer.

Following his release by Rennes, Boukaka had a trial at Ligue 2 side Angers but was not offered a deal. He eventually signed for fellow Ligue 2 outfit Tours ahead of the 2012–13 campaign and made his debut for the side on 14 September 2012, coming on as a late substitute for Bryan Bergougnoux in a 1–1 draw away at Clermont. After starting the next three games, Boukaka returned to the bench and went on to make a further four substitute appearances during the first three months of the season. He was loaned to Boulogne in January until the end of the 2012–13 season.

In 2013, Boukaka signed for Amiens. In 2014, he signed for Romanian club Rapid București, where he made two appearances. In 2016, he signed for Dieppe.

From 2017 to 2020, Boukaka played for Saint-Priest. He signed for Thonon Evian in 2020, and after only one season at the club, joined Bourgoin-Jallieu in 2021.

== Career statistics ==
As of match played 23 April 2022

Appearances and goals by club, season and competition
| Club | Season | League | | | National Cup | | Other | | Total | |
| Club | Season | Division | Apps | Goals | Apps | Goals | Apps | Goals | Apps | Goals |
|---|---|---|---|---|---|---|---|---|---|---|
| Rennes B | 2009–10 | CFA | 8 | 1 | — | | — | | 8 | 1 |
| Rennes B | 2010–11 | CFA | 26 | 1 | — | | — | | 26 | 1 |
| Rennes B | 2011–12 | CFA 2 | 24 | 6 | — | | — | | 24 | 6 |
| Rennes B | Total | | 58 | 8 | — | | — | | 58 | 8 |
| Tours | 2012–13 | Ligue 2 | 12 | 0 | 1 | 0 | 0 | 0 | 13 | 0 |
| Boulogne (loan) | 2012–13 | National | 9 | 2 | 0 | 0 | 0 | 0 | 9 | 2 |
| Boulogne B (loan) | 2012–13 | CFA 2 | 6 | 0 | — | | — | | 6 | 0 |
| Amiens | 2013–14 | National | 6 | 0 | 0 | 0 | 1 (Note: Appearance in the Coupe de la Ligue) | 0 | 7 | 0 |
| Amiens B | 2013–14 | CFA 2 | 10 | 5 | — | | — | | 10 | 5 |
| Rapid București | 2014–15 | Liga I | 1 | 0 | 1 | 0 | 0 | 0 | 2 | 0 |
| Dieppe | 2016–17 | CFA | 25 | 1 | 0 | 0 | 0 | 0 | 25 | 1 |
| Saint-Priest | 2017–18 | National 2 | 29 | 2 | 0 | 0 | 0 | 0 | 29 | 2 |
| Saint-Priest | 2018–19 | National 2 | 18 | 3 | 0 | 0 | 0 | 0 | 18 | 3 |
| Saint-Priest | 2019–20 | National 2 | 17 | 7 | 0 | 0 | 0 | 0 | 17 | 7 |
| Saint-Priest | Total | | 64 | 12 | 0 | 0 | 0 | 0 | 64 | 12 |
| Thonon Evian | 2020–21 | National 3 | 3 | 0 | 0 | 0 | 0 | 0 | 3 | 0 |
| Bourgoin-Jallieu | 2021–22 | National 3 | 19 | 4 | 2 | 1 | 0 | 0 | 21 | 5 |
| Career total | | | 213 | 32 | 4 | 1 | 1 | 0 | 218 | 33 |
