= Diacko Fofana =

French footballer (born 1994)

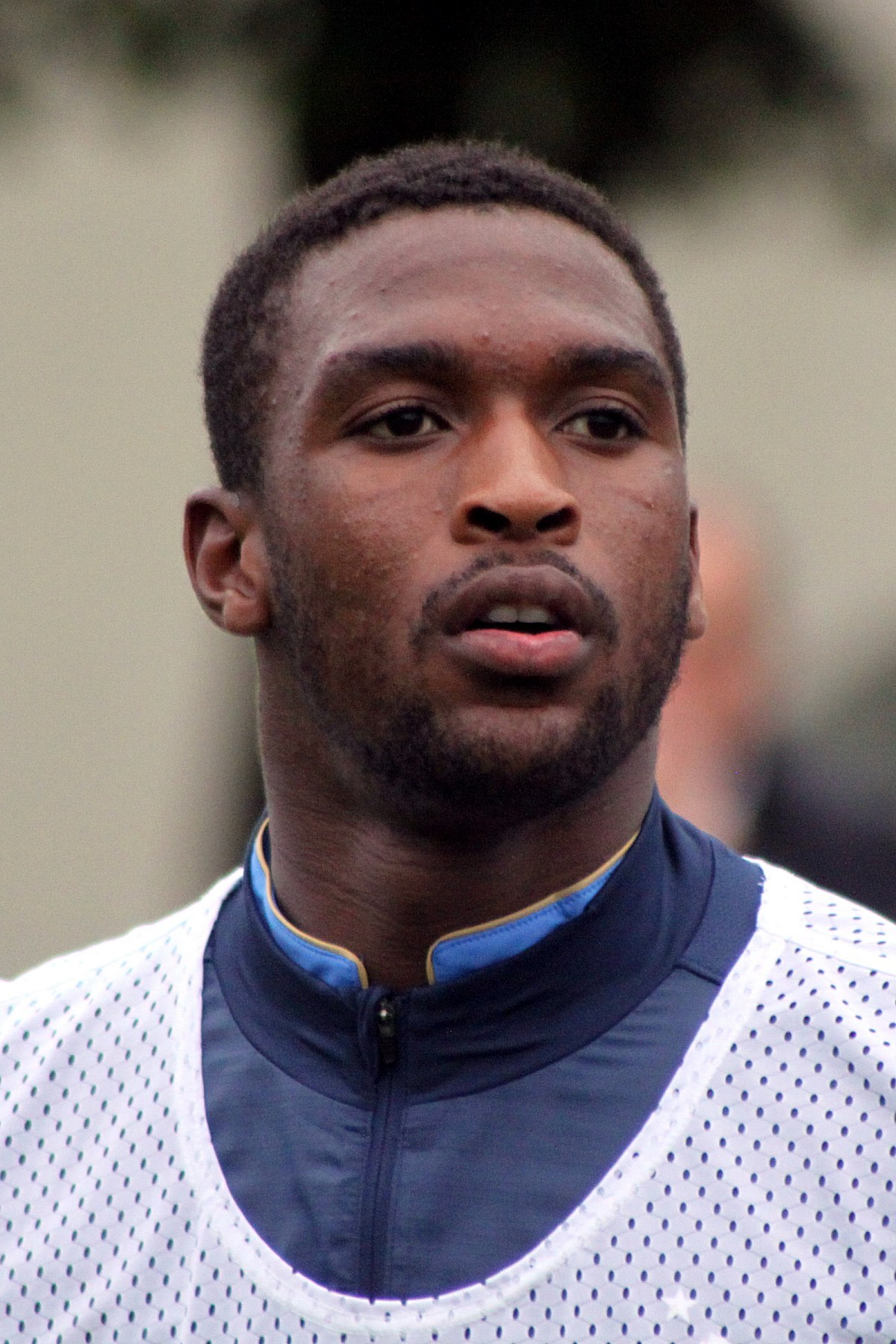

Personal information
- Full name: Diacko Fofana
- Date of birth: 29 July 1994 (age 32)
- Place of birth: Vernon, France
- Height: 1.75 m (5 ft 9 in)
- Position: Right back

Team information
- Current team: Le Havre B

Youth career
- 2001–2004: Les Andelys
- 2004–2006: Aubevoye
- 2006–2010: Le Havre
- 2011: Caen
- 2011–2012: Nice

Senior career*
Years	Team	Apps	(Gls)
2012–2014	Nice	5	(0)
2015–2016	Marseille Consolat	1	(0)
2017	AS Monaco C	0	(0)
2019–	Le Havre B	6	(0)
2019–	Le Havre	0	(0)

International career
2012	France U18	6	(0)
2013	France U19	2	(0)
- * Club domestic league appearances and goals as of 01:33, 10 February 2020 (UTC)

Diacko Fofana (born 29 July 1994) is a French footballer who currently plays for the B-team of Le Havre AC. He primarily plays as a right back.

== Personal life ==
Fofana was born in Verdon, France. He holds French and Malian nationalities.

== Career ==
He previously played in the youth academies of professional clubs Le Havre and Caen before signing with Nice in July 2011. On 28 January 2012, he made his professional debut in a 1–0 defeat to Montpellier. Fofana started the match, but was substituted out after 60 minutes.

== Honours ==
=== Club ===
Nice

- Coupe Gambardella (1): 2011–12
