= Nicolas Seguin =

French footballer (born 1990)

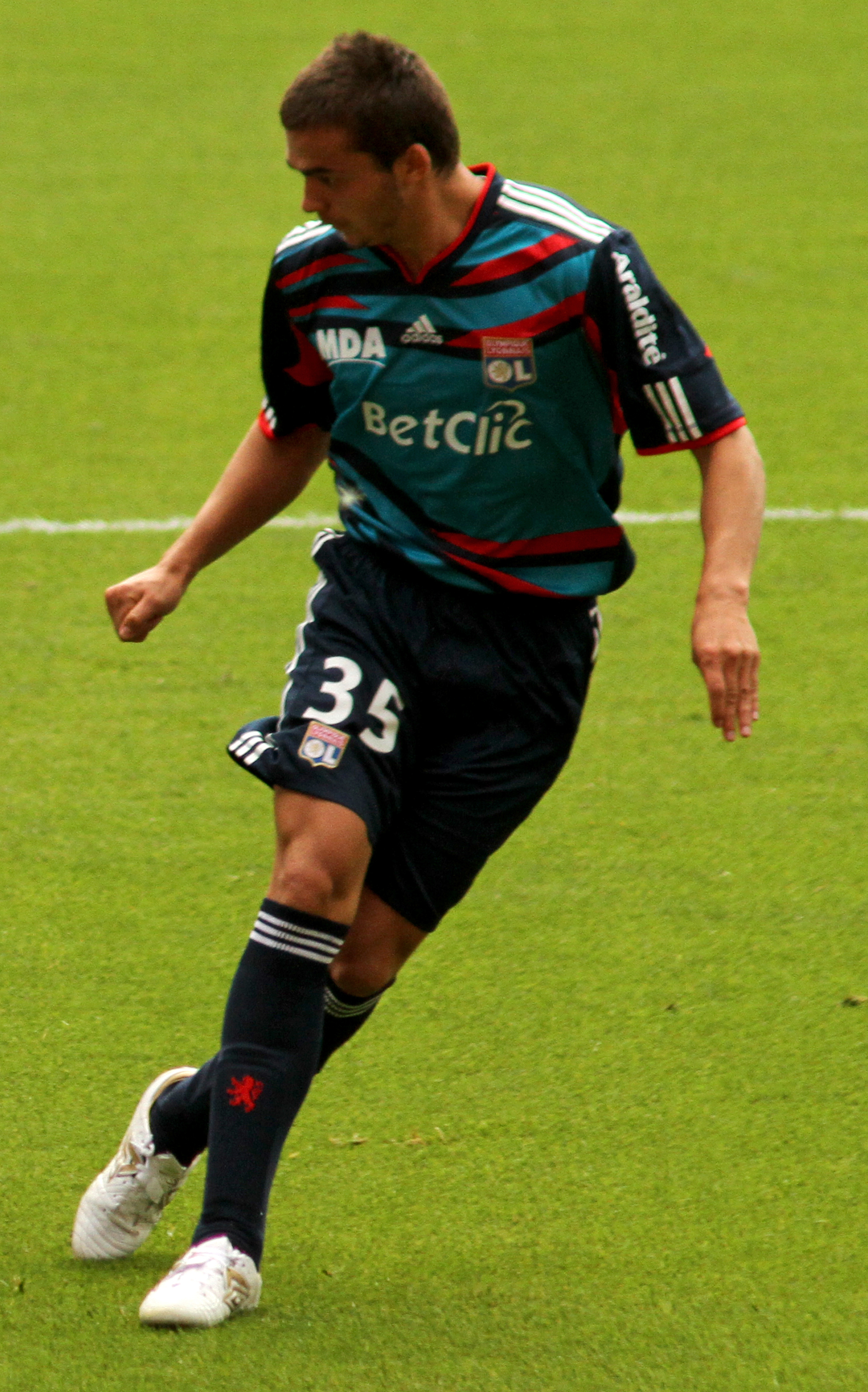

Personal information
- Date of birth: 6 March 1990 (age 36)
- Place of birth: Lyon, France
- Height: 1.81 m (5 ft 11 in)
- Position: Centre-back

Youth career
- 1996–1998: Villars-les-Dombes
- 1998–1999: Dombes
- 1999–2003: Bellecour Perrache Lyon
- 2003–2010: Lyon

Senior career*
| Years | Team | Apps | (Gls) |
| 2010–2012 | Lyon B | 19 | (1) |
| 2010–2011 | → Dijon (loan) | 3 | (0) |
| 2012–2014 | Tours | 12 | (0) |
| 2013–2014 | Tours B | 8 | (0) |
| 2015–2021 | Lyon La Duchère (Note: In 2020, AS Lyon-Duchère was renamed to SC Lyon. In 2021, the club was renamed to Lyon La Duchère.) | 117 | (5) |
| 2020 | Lyon La Duchère B | 4 | (1) |
| 2022–2025 | Bourgoin-Jallieu | 70 | (3) |

International career
| 2007 | France U17 | 8 | (0) |
| 2007–2008 | France U18 | 3 | (0) |
| 2008–2009 | France U19 | 5 | (0) |
- * Club domestic league appearances and goals as of 22:09, 14 July 2025 (UTC)

Nicolas Seguin (born 6 March 1990) is a French professional footballer who plays as a centre-back.

== Club career ==
Prior to the start of the 2010–11 season, Seguin signed his first professional contract after agreeing to a three-year deal with Lyon. He joined Dijon on loan for the season on 30 September 2010. He made his professional debut with Dijon on 15 October 2010 in a Ligue 2 match against Metz. Seguin played the entire match in a 3–1 defeat.

In 2012 Seguin left Lyon and joined Tours with team-mates Thomas Fontaine and Xavier Chavalerin.

Seguin signed for Lyon-Duchère in the summer of 2015.

== International career ==
Seguin has represented France internationally, having earned caps at under-17, under-18, and under-19 level.
