= Joris Delle =

French footballer (born 1990)

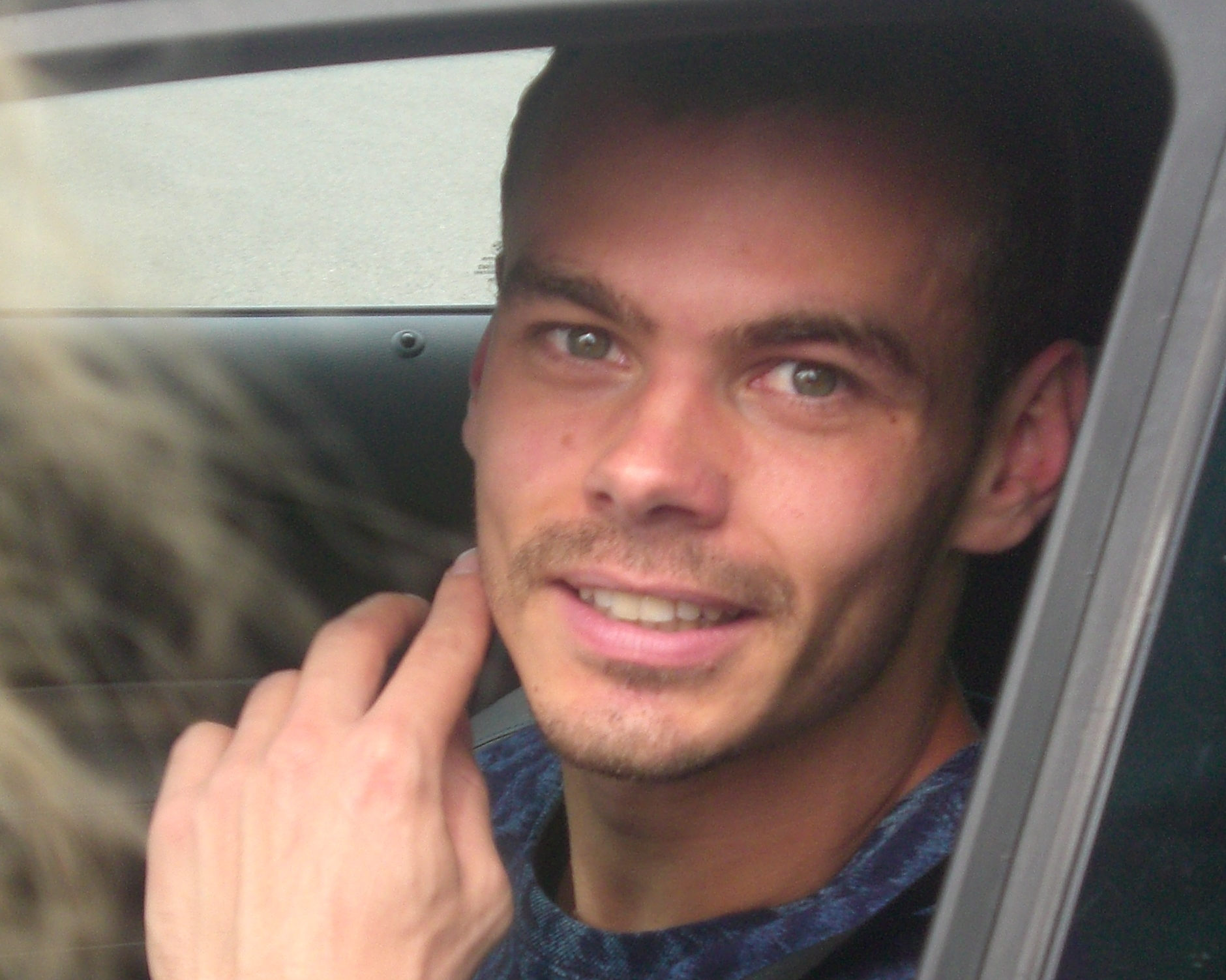

Personal information
- Date of birth: 29 March 1990 (age 36)
- Place of birth: Briey, France
- Height: 1.90 m (6 ft 3 in)
- Position: Goalkeeper

Youth career
- 1996–2002: Bouligny-Baroncourt
- 2002–2004: Homécourt
- 2004–2008: Metz

Senior career*
Years	Team	Apps	(Gls)
2008–2012	Metz	38	(0)
2012–2015	Nice	15	(0)
2013–2014	→ Cercle Brugge (loan)	28	(0)
2015–2016	Lens	20	(0)
2016–2018	NEC	66	(0)
2018–2019	Feyenoord	2	(0)
2019–2020	Orlando Pirates	3	(0)
2021–2023	Kortrijk	1	(0)

International career
2005–2006	France U16	10	(0)
2006–2007	France U17	15	(0)
2007–2008	France U18	3	(0)
2010–2013	France U21	8	(0)
- * Club domestic league appearances and goals as of 23 April 2023

Joris Delle (born 29 March 1990) is a French footballer who plays as a goalkeeper. He is a former French youth international and has served as the number one goalkeeper at under-16, under-17, and under-21 level. Delle was a member of the 2005–06 Metz under-16 team that won the Championnat National des 16 ans.

== Club career ==
Delle was born in Briey, France.

On 23 May 2007, he signed his first professional contract agreeing to a three-year deal with FC Metz. For the 2009–10 season, he was installed as the club's fourth goalkeeper and its first-choice on the amateur team in the Championnat de France amateur 2. Delle appeared in 11 matches as Metz were crowned champions of the league finishing with 107 points. On 20 August 2010, he made his professional debut in a league match against Vannes earning a clean sheet in a 1–0 victory.

On 2 July 2012, Delle joined Ligue 1 club Nice on a four-year deal.

In 2013, Delle was loaned for one season to Belgian Pro League club Cercle Brugge.

On 3 July 2015, Delle signed for RC Lens.

On 3 August 2016, he signed a two-year contract with NEC Nijmegen.

On 6 August 2018, he signed a one-year contract with Feyenoord.

On 24 June 2019, he signed for Orlando Pirates in South Africa on a 3-year deal. He made his debut for Orlando Pirates in a league match against Chippa United at the Orlando stadium where they won 2–1. He was released by Pirates in October 2020.

On 15 June 2021, he returned to Belgium and signed a two-year contract with Kortrijk.

== Career statistics ==
As of match played 2 May 2022

Appearances and goals by club, season and competition
Club	Season	League			National cup		League cup		Other		Total	
Club	Season	Division	Apps	Goals	Apps	Goals	Apps	Goals	Apps	Goals	Apps	Goals
Metz	2007–08	Ligue 1	0	0	0	0	—		—		0	0
Metz	2008–09	Ligue 2	0	0	0	0	0	0	—		0	0
Metz	2009–10	Ligue 2	0	0	0	0	0	0	—		0	0
Metz	2010–11	Ligue 2	28	0	1	0	0	0	—		29	0
Metz	2011–12	Ligue 2	10	0	0	0	1	0	—		11	0
Metz	Total		38	0	1	0	1	0	—		40	0
Nice	2012–13	Ligue 1	14	0	2	0	1	0	—		17	0
Nice	2013–14	Ligue 1	0	0	—		—		—		0	0
Nice	2014–15	Ligue 1	1	0	0	0	0	0	—		1	0
Nice	Total		15	0	2	0	1	0	—		18	0
Cercle Brugge (loan)	2013–14	Belgian Pro League	28	0	4	0	—		—		32	0
Lens	2015–16	Ligue 2	20	0	0	0	1	0	—		21	0
NEC	2016–17	Eredivisie	34	0	1	0	—		4	0	39	0
NEC	2017–18	Eerste Divisie	32	0	2	0	—		—		34	0
NEC	Total		66	0	3	0	—		4	0	73	0
Feyenoord	2018–19	Eredivisie	2	0	0	0	—		—		2	0
Orlando Pirates	2019–20	South African Premiership	3	0	1	0	—		—		4	0
Kortrijk	2021–22	Belgian First Division A	1	0	3	0	—		—		4	0
Career total			173	0	14	0	3	0	4	0	194	0
