= Salim Mramboini =

Footballer (born 1984)

Personal information
- Full name: Salim Mramboini
- Date of birth: 26 August 1984 (age 42)
- Place of birth: Marseille, France
- Height: 1.89 m (6 ft 2 in)
- Position: Defender

Youth career
- 1996–1997: La Jo Saint-Gabriel Marseille
- 1997–2006: FC Rousset

Senior career*
Years	Team	Apps	(Gls)
2006–2010	Martigues	37	(1)
2010–2017	Marseille Consolat (Note: In 2018, Marseille Consolat was renamed to Athlético Marseille.)	154	(4)
2017–2018	Martigues	14	(1)
2018–2022	Athlético Marseille	62	(2)
2022–2024	Marignane GCB	37	(0)
2022	Marignane GCB B	2	(0)
Total		306	(8)

International career
2007–2018	Comoros	12	(0)

Managerial career
- 2025: Martigues
- * Club domestic league appearances and goals

Salim Mramboini (born 26 August 1984) is a professional football coach and former player who played as a defender. Born in France, he is a former Comoros international.

== Club career ==
Mramboini was born in Marseille. In the summer of 2010, he left Championnat de France Amateur club Martigues and joined Marseille Consolat.

== Post-playing career ==
In July 2025, Mramboini was appointed as the head coach of Martigues. In December 2025, he joined FC Rousset SVO as an assistant coach.
