= Nicolas Haquin =

French footballer (born 1980)

Personal information
- Full name: Nicolas Haquin
- Date of birth: 15 December 1980 (age 45)
- Place of birth: Léhon, France
- Height: 1.83 m (6 ft 0 in)
- Position: Striker

Team information
- Current team: Vannes
- Number: 15

Youth career
- 2005–2006: En Avant Guingamp B

Senior career*
Years	Team	Apps	(Gls)
2006–2009	Guingamp	35	(6)
2009–2011	Clermont Foot	70	(11)
2011–	Vannes		

International career
2008–	Brittany	1	(0)
- * Club domestic league appearances and goals as of 15:31, 13 November 2009 (UTC)

Nicolas Haquin (born 15 December 1980) is a French footballer who plays as an attacker.

Haquin was born in Léhon, France, in 1980. He started his professional career in 2005, playing for EA Guingamp's reserves. In 2006, he moved up to the full team. Since then he has played 35 matches and scored ten goals, nine in Ligue 2 and one in a cup match.
