= Thomas Fontaine =

Footballer (born 1991)

Personal information
- Date of birth: 8 May 1991 (age 35)
- Place of birth: Saint-Pierre, Réunion
- Height: 1.82 m (6 ft 0 in)
- Position: Defender

Youth career
- 1998–2003: C.O.M. de Terre Sainte
- 2003–2007: Saint-Pierroise
- 2007–2013: Lyon

Senior career*
Years	Team	Apps	(Gls)
2008–2012	Lyon B	77	(1)
2012–2014	Tours	55	(0)
2014–2016	Auxerre	33	(0)
2016–2018	Clermont	69	(1)
2018–2019	Reims	7	(0)
2019–2022	Lorient	22	(0)
2022	Nancy	14	(0)
2022	Beroe	7	(0)
2023	Gençlerbirliği	15	(0)
2023–2025	Sochaux	43	(0)

International career^{‡}
2011	France U20	6	(0)
2017–	Madagascar	36	(2)
- * Club domestic league appearances and goals as of 26 May 2025 ‡ National team caps and goals as of 18 June 2026

Thomas Fontaine (born 8 May 1991) is a professional footballer who plays as a defender. Born in Réunion, he represents the Madagascar national team.

== Club career ==
Fontaine made his professional debut on 30 July 2012, coming on as a substitute for Yacoub Meite in the 4–0 defeat to Monaco.

On 29 January 2022, Fontaine signed with Nancy.

After a brief spell with Beroe in Bulgaria, Fontaine joined TFF First League club Gençlerbirliği on a one-and-a-half-year deal on 10 January 2023.

On 21 August 2023, Fontaine joined Championnat National club Sochaux on a two-year deal.

== International career ==
Fontaine represented the France U21 national team at the 2011 FIFA U-20 World Cup. Fontaine made his senior debut for Madagascar in a 2019 Africa Cup of Nations qualification win over Sudan on 9 June 2017. He represented the national team at 2019 Africa Cup of Nations.

== Career statistics ==
As of 30 June 2019

Appearances and goals by club, season and competition
Club	Season	League			Coupe de France		Coupe de la Ligue		Total	
Club	Season	Division	Apps	Goals	Apps	Goals	Apps	Goals	Apps	Goals
Lyon B	2008–09	CFA Group B	20	1	0	0	0	0	20	1
Lyon B	2009–10	CFA Group B	10	0	0	0	0	0	10	0
Lyon B	2010–11	CFA Group B	26	0	0	0	0	0	26	0
Lyon B	2011–12	CFA Group B	21	0	0	0	0	0	21	0
Lyon B	Total		77	1	0	0	0	0	77	1
Tours	2012–13	Ligue 2	21	0	0	0	2	0	23	0
Tours	2013–14	Ligue 2	34	0	0	0	3	0	37	0
Tours	2014–15	Ligue 2	0	0	0	0	1	0	1	0
Tours	Total		55	0	0	0	6	0	61	0
Auxerre	2014–15	Ligue 2	26	0	8	0	0	0	34	0
Auxerre	2015–16	Ligue 2	7	0	0	0	2	0	9	0
Auxerre	Total		33	0	8	0	2	0	43	0
Clermont	2016–17	Ligue 2	34	1	1	0	2	0	37	1
Clermont	2017–18	Ligue 2	35	0	0	0	2	0	37	0
Clermont	Total		69	1	1	0	4	0	74	1
Reims	2018–19	Ligue 1	7	0	2	0	1	0	10	0
Career total			241	2	11	0	13	0	265	2

=== International ===
As of matches played on 1 June 2026

Appearances and goals by national team and year
National team	Year	Apps	Goals
Madagascar	2017	3	0
Madagascar	2018	5	0
Madagascar	2019	10	0
Madagascar	2020	3	0
Madagascar	2021	2	1
Madagascar	2023	2	0
Madagascar	2024	6	0
Madagascar	2025	3	0
Madagascar	2026	2	1
Total		36	2

=== International goals ===
Scores and results list Madagascar's goal tally first.

No.	Date	Venue	Opponent	Score	Result	Competition
1.	7 September 2021	National Stadium, Dar es Salaam, Tanzania	Tanzania	2–2	2–3	2022 FIFA World Cup qualification
2.	28 March 2026	Bellis Hotel Sports Center, Belek, Turkey	Kyrgyzstan	2–0	5–2	Friendly

== Honours ==
Lorient

- Ligue 2: 2020

Auxerre

- Coupe de France: runner-up: 2015

Orders

- Knight Order of Madagascar: 2019
