= Xavier Tomas =

French footballer (born 1986)

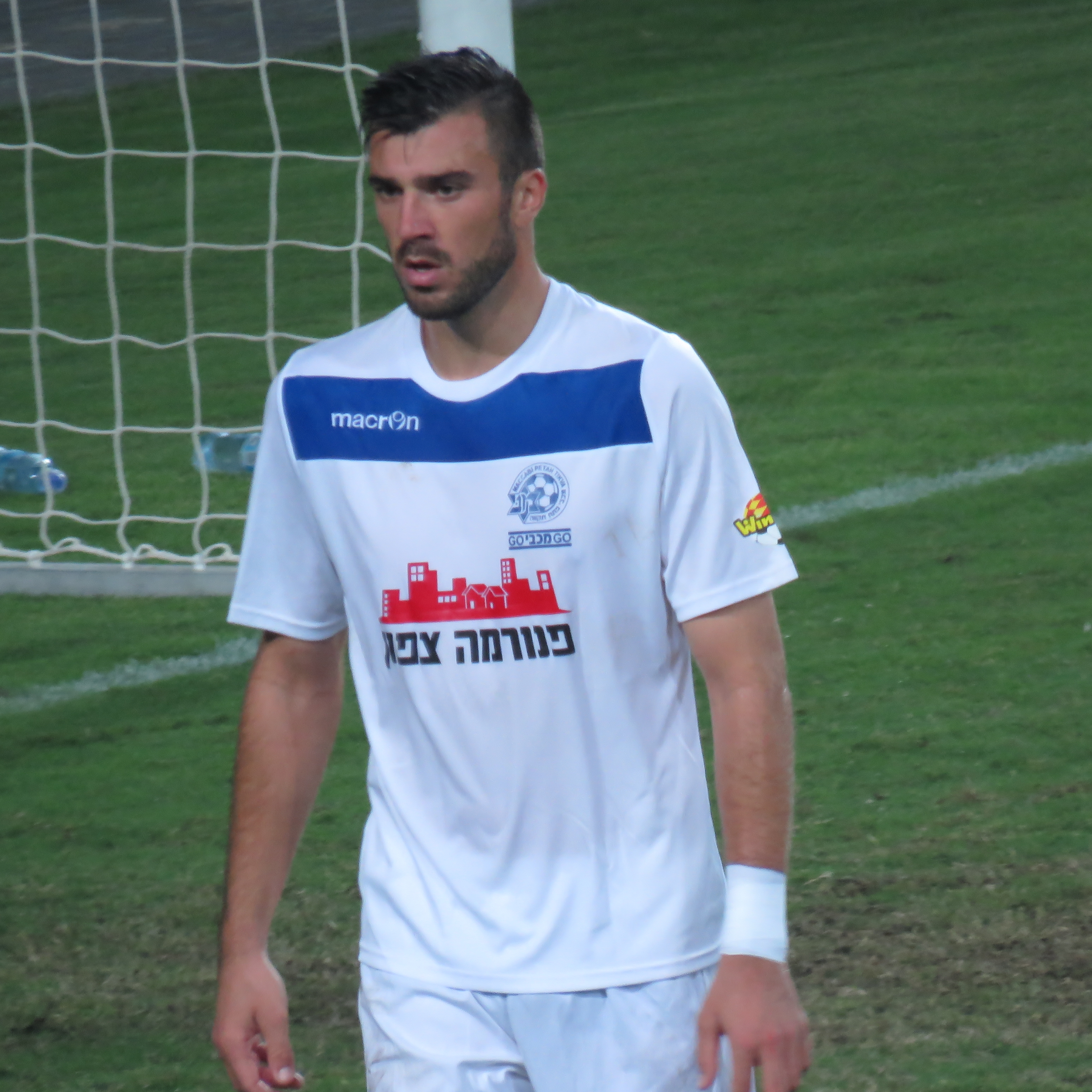
- Tomas in 2015

Personal information
- Date of birth: 4 January 1986 (age 40)
- Place of birth: Nantua, France
- Height: 1.83 m (6 ft 0 in)
- Position: Centre-back

Team information
- Current team: Bassin Piennois
- Number: 5

Youth career
- Gueugnon

Senior career*
Years	Team	Apps	(Gls)
2004–2006	Gueugnon	7	(0)
2006–2007	→ Rodez (loan)	0	(0)
2007–2010	Tours	35	(0)
2010–2011	Olympiakos Volos	27	(2)
2011–2012	Levadiakos	25	(0)
2012–2014	Tours	27	(1)
2014–2015	Levadiakos	29	(3)
2015–2016	Maccabi Petah Tikva	34	(4)
2016	Bnei Yehuda Tel Aviv	12	(0)
2017	Lausanne-Sport	3	(0)
2017–2018	Hamilton Academical	36	(1)
2018–2019	Red Star	24	(1)
2019–2020	Laval	20	(1)
2020–2021	Jeunesse d'Esch	27	(0)
2021–2022	Mercy-le-Bas		
2022–	Bassin Piennois		

Managerial career
- 2022–: Bassin Piennois (U15)
- * Club domestic league appearances and goals as of 20 September 2020 (UTC)

Xavier Tomas (born 4 January 1986) is a French professional footballer who plays as a centre back for FC Bassin Piennois.

== Career ==
Tomas was born in Nantua, Ain. He signed for Lausanne-Sport in January 2017, then moved to Scottish club Hamilton Academical six months later. Tomas was sent off in his league debut for Hamilton, a 2–0 defeat at Aberdeen on 6 August 2017.

He was one of seven first-team players released by Hamilton at the end of the 2017–18 season, and signed for Red Star F.C. as a free agent in September 2018.

On 7 June 2019, Tomas joined Stade Lavallois on a one-year contract with an option for a further year.

== Personal life ==
Born in France, Tomas holds French and Portuguese nationalities.
