= Stéphane Tritz =

French footballer (born 1987)

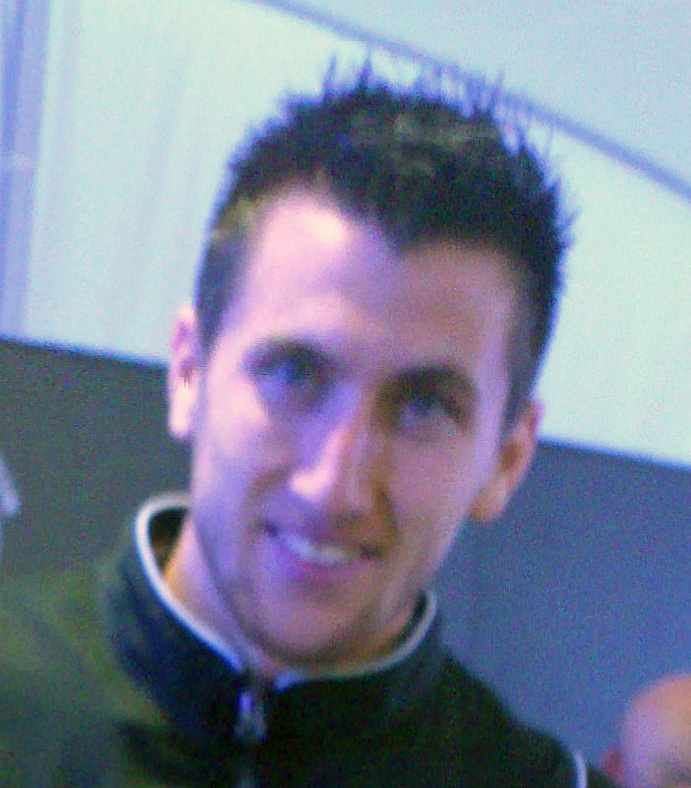

Personal information
- Date of birth: 25 February 1987 (age 39)
- Place of birth: Strasbourg, France
- Height: 1.76 m (5 ft 9 in)
- Position: Right back

Team information
- Current team: Wormatia Worms
- Number: 16

Youth career
- 2003–2005: Strasbourg

Senior career*
Years	Team	Apps	(Gls)
2005–2008	Strasbourg B	70	(2)
2009	Colmar	10	(0)
2009–2010	Rodez	37	(0)
2010–2014	Tours	59	(0)
2014	Oțelul Galați	10	(0)
2014–2015	Brest B	12	(0)
2014–2015	Brest	13	(0)
2015–2018	Preußen Münster	68	(1)
2019–	Wormatia Worms	13	(0)

International career
- France U-19
- * Club domestic league appearances and goals as of 21:09, 16 May 2019 (UTC)

Stéphane Tritz (born 25 February 1987) is a French professional footballer who plays as a right back for Wormatia Worms.
