= Jérémy Blayac =

French footballer (born 1983)

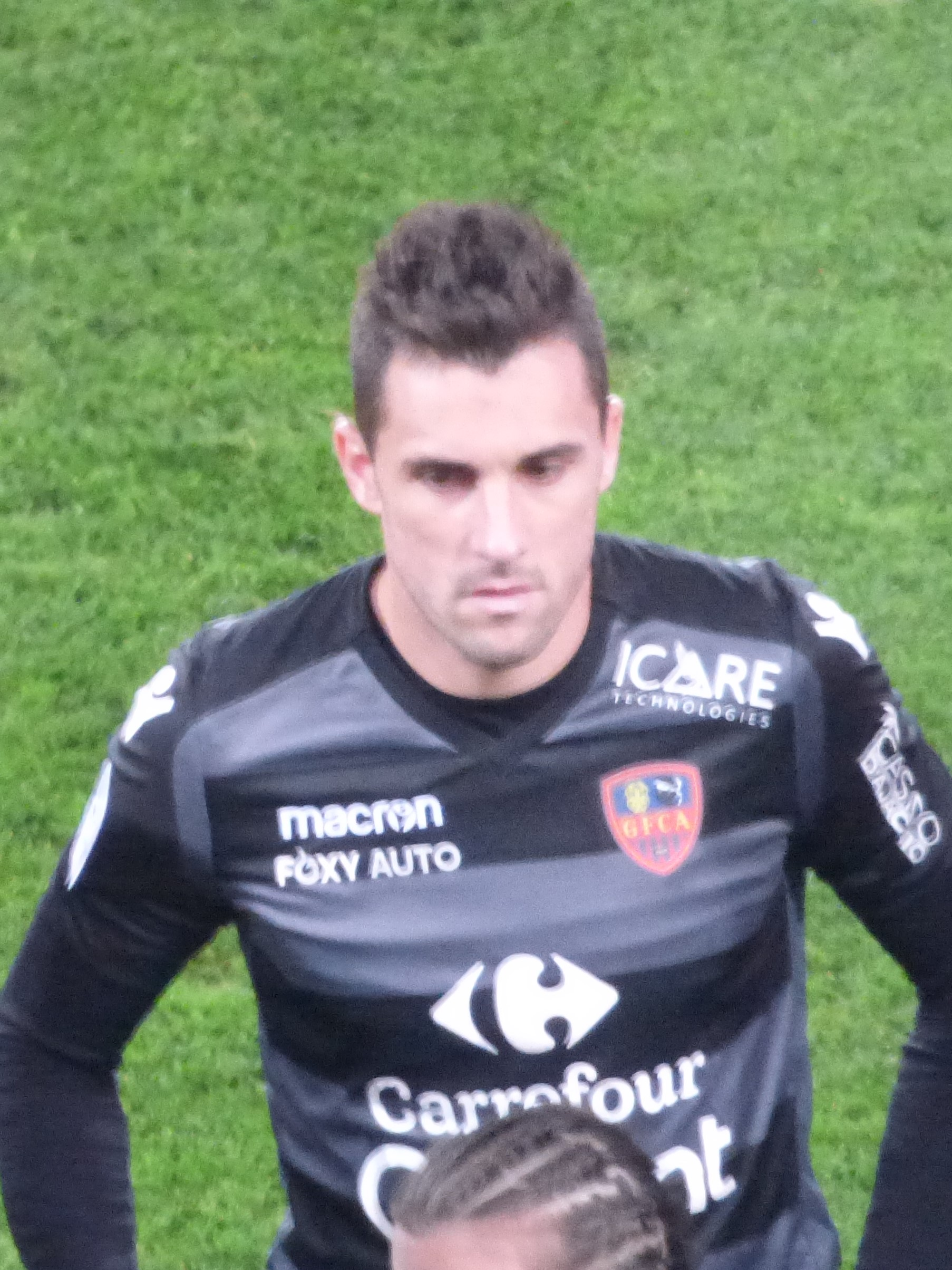
- Blayac with Gazélec Ajaccio in 2018

Personal information
- Date of birth: 13 June 1983 (age 43)
- Place of birth: Saint-Affrique, France
- Height: 1.87 m (6 ft 2 in)
- Position: Forward

Youth career
- Rodez

Senior career*
Years	Team	Apps	(Gls)
2000–2004	Toulouse	17	(0)
2004–2005	Reims	26	(3)
2005–2008	Cannes	36	(16)
2006–2007	→ Châteauroux (loan)	21	(0)
2008–2011	Boulogne	59	(17)
2011–2013	Tours	69	(20)
2013–2015	Angers	42	(6)
2015	→ Strasbourg (loan)	13	(12)
2015–2018	Strasbourg	85	(18)
2018–2019	Gazélec Ajaccio	31	(2)
Total		399	(94)
- * Club domestic league appearances and goals

Jérémy Blayac (born 13 June 1983) is a French former professional footballer who played as a forward.

== Career ==
Born in Saint-Affrique, Blayac began his football career in the youth academy of French club Toulouse FC. He left the club in 2004 to join Ligue 2 side Stade de Reims, where he spent one season. Blayac then had two stints at AS Cannes, with a season at LB Châteauroux in between. In 2008, he joined French second tier club US Boulogne.

On 29 January 2011, he made his Tours FC debut in a 3–1 defeat to Clermont. After four league appearances, he scored his first goal for Tours on 18 February 2011, at Stade de la Vallée du Cher, securing a 1–0 win against Troyes.

Blayac retired from professional football at the end of the 2018–19 season.
