= Athlético Marseille =

- Full name: Athlético Marseille
- Nickname: Consolat Le club des Quartiers Nord
- Founded: 1964; 62 years ago
- Dissolved: 2022; 4 years ago
- Ground: Stade La Martine, Marseille
- Capacity: 1,990
- Chairman: Jean-Luc Mingallon
- Manager: Farid Fouzari
- 2021–22: National 2 Group D, 12th (relegated)
- Website: http://www.athleticomarseille.com
| Home colours | Away colours |

Athlético Marseille (formerly Groupe Sportif Consolat and sometimes referred to as Marseille Consolat) is a French amateur football club founded in 1964 and based in the city of Marseille, Bouches-du-Rhone. The club was named until 2018 after Consolat, a neighborhood located in La Calade, in the 15th arrondissement of the city. In July 2022 the club filed for bankruptcy, and will need to reform at District level.

== History ==
Founded in 1964 by the residents of Consolat, the club has been run by current club president Jean-Luc Mingallon since 1983. Mingallon pushed the team to success which has led to their promotion from the Division d’Honneur in 1999. In 2006, the club reached the national amateur level of football with its promotion to CFA2. This promotion sparked new derbies with the reserve team of Olympique de Marseille and US Endoume. The desire to become "the second club of Marseille" was one step closer with the promotion to the CFA in 2011. Consolat won the CFA title in 2014, earning promotion to the Championnat National, the third tier of French football. They nearly were promoted to Ligue 2 during the 2015-2016 season, falling short only by a single point behind Amiens SC. They again missed out on possible promotion in the following season, finishing behind division rivals Paris FC due only to goal differential.

In the summer of 2018, Consolat underwent a re-branding process and changed their name to Athlético Marseille.

Despite finishing 5th in the league, Athlético Marseille were relegated to Championnat National 3 in 2019, due to financial issues.

In 2020 the club secured top position in their group when the 2019–20 season ended prematurely, due to the COVID-19 pandemic. However, on 9 June 2020, the Commission Régionale de Contrôle des Clubs (CRCC) of the Ligue de Méditerranée announced that the club would be administratively relegated to Régional 2 for financial irregularities. The club appealed, and on 6 July 2020 the appeals committee of the FFF's DNCG overruled this decision, reinstating the club to National 3, and re-presenting the case for promotion to the CRCC. The CRCC once again denied the club promotion on 15 July 2020. The club appealed again to the FFF and, on 27 July 2020, the appeals committee of the FFF's DNCG confirmed the promotion to National 2. Three days later, the disciplinary committee of the FFF announced that they were demoting the club back to National 3, due to the production of fraudulent documentation at the end of the 2018–19 season.

In July 2022 the club filed for bankruptcy, with debts of 800,000 Euros, following sporting relegation from Championnat National 3. It will need to reform in the district leagues of Provence to continue playing.

== Current squad ==
As of 14 February 2019

Note: Flags indicate national team as defined under FIFA eligibility rules; some limited exceptions apply. Players may hold more than one non-FIFA nationality.

| No. | Pos. | Nation | Player |
|---|---|---|---|
| 1 | GK | COM | Salim Ben Boina |
| 2 | DF | SEN | Idrissa Dibassy |
| 3 | DF | FRA | Abdelkrim Khechmar |
| 4 | DF | FRA | Jérémy Nicodème |
| 5 | DF | COM | Ahmed Soilihi |
| 6 | MF | COM | Salim Mramboini |
| 7 | MF | FRA | Deniz Erdogan |
| 8 | MF | SEN | Papa Ibnou Ba |
| 9 | FW | FRA | Hamidi Nagui |
| 10 | MF | FRA | Driss Zidane |
| 11 | FW | COM | Mohamed M'Changama |
| 17 | DF | FRA | Mehdi Messaoudi |

| No. | Pos. | Nation | Player |
|---|---|---|---|
| 18 | MF | FRA | Mickaël Seymand |
| 19 | MF | FRA | Mouloud Meghzel |
| 20 | DF | FRA | Mohamed Nehari |
| 21 | DF | FRA | Bassiri Keita |
| 22 | MF | FRA | Yamine Amiri |
| 23 | MF | FRA | Clément Goguey |
| 24 | DF | FRA | Edgar Alexandre |
| 27 | MF | FRA | Sander Benchabir |
| 29 | MF | COM | Omar M'Dahoma |
| 30 | GK | FRA | Yann Van Minden |
| 33 | DF | FRA | Hugo Sanchez |
| 34 | FW | FRA | Mohamed Boutaleb |
| — | DF | COM | Kassim Abdallah |

== Notable coaches ==
- Gaetan Hardouin
- Nordine Essemeri
- Stéphane Haro
