= Mohamed Ali Ghariani =

Tunisian footballer

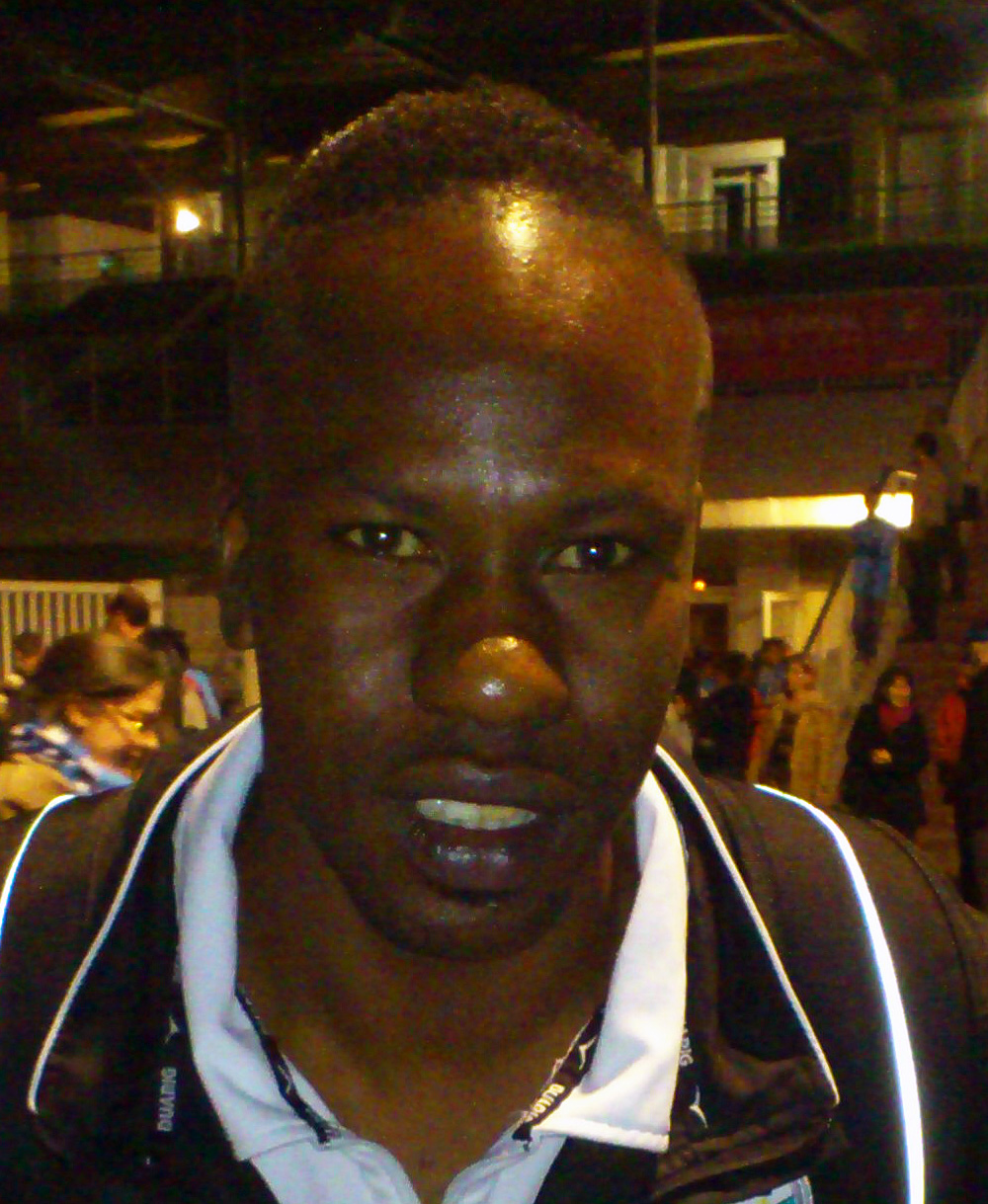
- Ghariani in 2012

Personal information
- Date of birth: 11 June 1983 (age 43)
- Place of birth: Zarzis, Tunisia
- Height: 1.80 m (5 ft 11 in)
- Position: Striker

Senior career*
| Years | Team | Apps | (Gls) |
| 2003–2005 | Zarzis | | |
| 2005–2006 | Ankaragücü | 5 | (0) |
| 2006–2007 | Club Africain | | |
| 2008–2009 | CS Hammam-Lif | | |
| 2009–2014 | Tours | 59 | (6) |
| 2014–2015 | AS Gabès | | |

International career
| 2006–2009 | Tunisia | 4 | (0) |
- * Club domestic league appearances and goals

Mohamed Ali Ghariani (Arabic: محمد علي الغرياني; born 11 June 1983) is a Tunisian former professional footballer who played as a striker.
