= Fabien Dao Castellana =

French footballer (born 1993)

Personal information
- Date of birth: 28 July 1993 (age 33)
- Place of birth: Saint-Raphaël, France
- Height: 1.69 m (5 ft 7 in)
- Position: Midfielder

Team information
- Current team: Villefranche SJB

Youth career
- 1999–2009: Fréjus Saint-Raphaël
- 2009–2012: Nice

Senior career*
Years	Team	Apps	(Gls)
2012	Nice	2	(0)
2012–2015	Nice B	49	(2)
2015–2019	Fréjus Saint-Raphaël	65	(1)
2019–2022	Grasse	33	(1)
2022–2023	Vence		
2023–	Villefranche SJB	8	(1)

International career
2012	France U20	1	(0)
- * Club domestic league appearances and goals as of 7 December 2024

Fabien Dao Castellana (born 28 July 1993) is a French professional footballer who plays as a midfielder for Championnat National 3 club Villefranche SJB.

== Club career ==
Born in Saint-Raphaël, Dao Castellana initially played for his local side Fréjus Saint-Raphaël as a youth player, before moving to Nice.

He was the captain of the Nice under-19 team that won the 2011–12 edition of the Coupe Gambardella, the most prestigious youth cup competition in France. On 24 May 2012, he signed his first professional contract for a three-year deal. Dao Castellana made his professional debut on 11 August 2012 in a league match against Ajaccio.
