= Pierre-François Sinapi =

French footballer (born 1990)

Personal information
- Date of birth: 24 May 1990 (age 36)
- Place of birth: Ajaccio, France
- Height: 1.83 m (6 ft 0 in)
- Position: Midfielder

Senior career*
| Years | Team | Apps | (Gls) |
| 2009–2010 | Ajaccio | 0 | (0) |
| 2010–2015 | Gazélec Ajaccio | 49 | (4) |
| 2015– | SC Bocognano Gravona | 0 | (0) |

International career
| 2012– | Corsica | 1 | (0) |
- * Club domestic league appearances and goals as of 01:34, 10 February 2018 (UTC)

Pierre-François Sinapi (born 24 May 1990) is a French professional footballer who plays as a midfielder.

== Career ==
Sinapi started his career in the youth team at AC Ajaccio, but transferred to Gazélec in the summer of 2010. Sinapi made 16 appearances in two seasons as the side won successive promotions, firstly to the Championnat National in 2011 and then to Ligue 2 for the 2012–13 campaign. He made his professional debut in the 1–2 defeat to Arles-Avignon in the second round of the Coupe de la Ligue on 28 August 2012.
