= Xavier Chavalerin =

French footballer (born 1991)

Personal information
- Date of birth: 7 March 1991 (age 35)
- Place of birth: Villeurbanne, France
- Height: 1.78 m (5 ft 10 in)
- Position: Midfielder

Youth career
- 2004–2012: Lyon

Senior career*
Years	Team	Apps	(Gls)
2010–2012	Lyon B	53	(7)
2012–2015	Tours	94	(3)
2015–2017	Red Star	65	(2)
2017–2021	Reims	128	(8)
2021–2026	Troyes	119	(12)
- * Club domestic league appearances and goals as of 11 May 2026

Xavier Chavalerin (born 7 March 1991) is a French professional footballer who plays as a midfielder.

== Career ==
Chavalerin joined Tours in 2012 from Olympique Lyonnais. He made his Ligue 2 debut at 30 July 2012 against AS Monaco replacing Billy Ketkeophomphone at half-time in a 4–0 away loss.

In July 2015, Chavalerin joined newly promoted team Red Star.

Chavalerin helped Stade de Reims win the 2017–18 Ligue 2, helping promote them to the Ligue 1 for the 2018–19 season.

On 29 August 2021, he joined Troyes on a three-year contract.

== Career statistics ==
As of 6 March 2022

Appearances and goals by club, season and competition
Club	Season	League			National Cup		League Cup		Europe		Total	
Club	Season	Division	Apps	Goals	Apps	Goals	Apps	Goals	Apps	Goals	Apps	Goals
Lyon II	2010–11	CFA	26	1	0	0	0	0	–		26	1
Lyon II	2011–12	CFA	27	6	0	0	0	0	–		27	6
Lyon II	Total		53	7	0	0	0	0	–		53	6
Tours	2012–13	Ligue 2	27	1	0	0	2	0	–		29	1
Tours	2013–14	Ligue 2	32	2	0	0	4	1	–		36	3
Tours	2014–15	Ligue 2	35	0	3	0	1	0	–		39	0
Tours	Total		94	3	3	0	7	1	–		104	4
Red Star	2015–16	Ligue 2	32	0	0	0	1	0	–		33	0
Red Star	2016–17	Ligue 2	33	2	0	0	1	0	–		34	2
Red Star	Total		65	2	0	0	2	0	–		67	2
Reims	2017–18	Ligue 2	35	5	1	0	1	0	–		37	5
Reims	2018–19	Ligue 1	36	2	2	1	1	0	–		39	3
Reims	2019–20	Ligue 1	24	1	1	0	3	0	–		28	1
Reims	2020–21	Ligue 1	30	0	0	0	–		2 (Note: Appearances in UEFA Europa League)	0	32	0
Reims	2021–22	Ligue 1	3	0	0	0	–		–		3	0
Reims	Total		128	8	4	1	5	0	2	0	139	9
Troyes	2021–22	Ligue 1	23	5	1	0	–		–		24	5
Career total			363	25	8	1	14	1	2	0	387	27
