= Romain Thibault =

French footballer (born 1991)

Personal information
- Date of birth: 6 January 1991 (age 35)
- Place of birth: Nîmes, France
- Height: 1.89 m (6 ft 2 in)
- Position: Forward

Team information
- Current team: Entente Perrier Vergeze

Youth career
- 1997–1998: U.S. Bouillargues
- 1998–2010: Nîmes Olympique

Senior career*
Years	Team	Apps	(Gls)
2010–2014	Nîmes	28	(4)
2013–2014	→ Bourg-Péronnas (loan)	23	(6)
2014–2015	Les Herbiers	18	(3)
2015–2016	Hyères	23	(3)
2016–2017	Martigues	27	(9)
2017–2018	Sète 34	26	(6)
2018–2019	Gallia Club d'Uchaud		
2019–	Entente Perrier Vergeze		
- * Club domestic league appearances and goals as of 22:25, 26 November 2019 (UTC)

Romain Thibault (born 6 January 1991 in Nîmes) is a French footballer who plays as a forward for French club Entente Perrier Vergeze.

== Career statistics ==
As of 24 March 2018

Appearances and goals by club, season and competition
Club	Season	League			National Cup		League Cup		Total	
Club	Season	Division	Apps	Goals	Apps	Goals	Apps	Goals	Apps	Goals
Nîmes Olympique	2010–11	Ligue 2	9	2	0	0	0	0	9	2
Nîmes Olympique	2011–12	National	3	0	2	0	0	0	5	0
Nîmes Olympique	2012–13	Ligue 2	15	2	0	0	1	1	16	3
Nîmes Olympique	2013–14	Ligue 2	1	0	0	0	0	0	1	0
Nîmes Olympique	Total		28	4	2	0	1	1	31	5
Nîmes Olympique II	2012–13	CFA 2	10	4	—		—		10	4
Bourg-en-Bresse (loan)	2013–14	National	23	6	1	0	—		24	6
Les Herbiers	2014–15	CFA	18	3	0	0	—		18	3
Hyères	2015–16	CFA	23	3	0	0	—		23	3
Martigues	2016–17	CFA	27	9	0	0	—		27	9
Sète 34	2017–18	National 2	21	4	0	0	—		21	4
Career total			150	33	3	0	1	1	154	34
