= Mickaël Colloredo =

French footballer (born 1980)

Personal information
- Full name: Mickaël Colloredo
- Date of birth: 16 September 1980 (age 46)
- Place of birth: Lyon, France
- Height: 1.72 m (5 ft 7 1/2 in)
- Position: Striker

Youth career
- –1998: Olympique Lyonnais

Senior career*
Years	Team	Apps	(Gls)
1998–2001	Lyon B	29	(12)
2001–2002	Sète	29	(13)
2002–2003	Chamois Niortais	19	(0)
2003–2004	Sète	26	(14)
2004–2010	Nîmes Olympique	131	(37)
2010–	Gazélec Ajaccio	118	(17)
- * Club domestic league appearances and goals

Mickaël Colloredo (born 16 September 1980) is a retired French professional footballer, who played as a striker.

== Career ==
Born in Lyon, Colloredo began his career with Olympique Lyonnais before going on to play for FC Sete, Chamois Niortais, Nîmes Olympique, and Gazélec Ajaccio.
