= Yancoub Meité =

Footballer (born 1990)

Personal information
- Date of birth: 10 February 1990 (age 36)
- Place of birth: Paris, France
- Height: 1.75 m (5 ft 9 in)
- Position: Defensive midfielder

Team information
- Current team: Martigny Sports
- Number: 14

Youth career
- 2008–2010: Strasbourg
- 2010–2011: Sion II

Senior career*
Years	Team	Apps	(Gls)
2010–2011	Sion	1	(0)
2011–2013	Tours	17	(0)
2013–2014	Cannes	4	(0)
2014–2015	Lausanne-Sport	19	(0)
2015–2016	FC Le Mont	17	(0)
2016–	Martigny Sports	69	(5)

International career
2011	Ivory Coast U20	6	(0)
2011–2012	Ivory Coast U23	3	(0)
- * Club domestic league appearances and goals as of 21:09, 11 June 2022 (UTC)

Yancoub Meité (born 10 February 1990) is a professional footballer who plays as a defensive midfielder for Swiss team FC Martigny-Sports. Born in France, he represented the Ivory Coast at youth level.

== Early life ==
Meité was born in Paris, France, to Ivorian parents.

== Club career ==
Meité made his Ligue 2 debut at Tours FC during the 2011–12 season.

== International career ==
He has played for the Ivory Coast U20s, and the Ivory Coast U23 team.
