= Mickaël Seymand =

French footballer (born 1984)

Personal information
- Date of birth: 15 July 1984 (age 42)
- Place of birth: Martigues, France
- Height: 1.76 m (5 ft 9 in)
- Position: Midfielder

Team information
- Current team: Athlético Marseille

Senior career*
Years	Team	Apps	(Gls)
2003–2006	Istres	0	(0)
2006–2008	Marignane	20	(0)
2008–2009	Gap	19	(0)
2009–2010	Marignane	19	(1)
2010–2013	Gazélec Ajaccio	80	(6)
2013–2014	Niki Volos	12	(1)
2014–2015	Consolat Marseille	22	(1)
2015–2016	CA Bastia	18	(1)
2016–2018	Marignane Gignac	35	(3)
2018–	Athlético Marseille	8	(1)
- * Club domestic league appearances and goals as of 18:55, 5 April 2018 (UTC)

Mickaël Seymand (born 15 July 1984) is a French professional footballer who currently plays for Championnat National 1 side Athlético Marseille. Born in Martigues, he started his career at Istres but did not make a first-team appearance for the club and later played in the Championnat de France amateur for both Marignane and Gap. Seymand joined Gazélec Ajaccio in 2010 and was part of the team that won successive promotions during the following two seasons. He made his professional debut in the 0–2 defeat away at his former club Istres on 3 August 2012.

After leaving Gazélec Ajaccio he played in Greece for Greek Football League side Niki Volos, before returning to France with Consolat Marseille and CA Bastia. He returned to Marignane Gignac (the new identity of US Marignane) in 2016.
