= Bryan Bergougnoux =

French footballer (1983–2026)

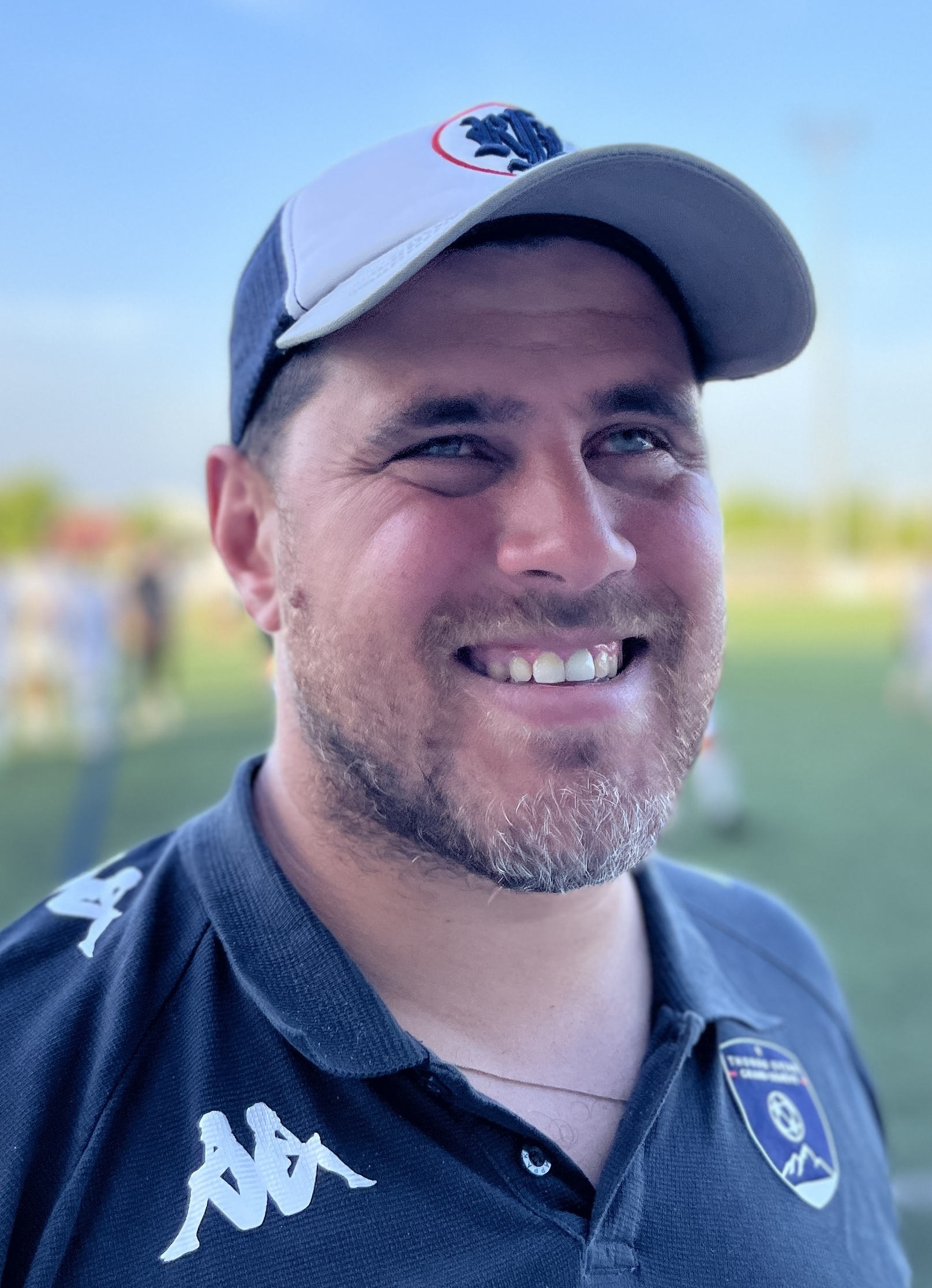
- Bergougnoux in 2022

Personal information
- Date of birth: 12 January 1983
- Place of birth: Lyon, France
- Date of death: 29 May 2026 (aged 43)
- Place of death: Toulouse, France
- Height: 1.77 m (5 ft 10 in)
- Position: Midfielder

Youth career
- 1992–1994: Olympique Saint-Genis-Laval
- 1994–2001: Lyon

Senior career*
Years	Team	Apps	(Gls)
2001–2005	Lyon	36	(4)
2005–2009	Toulouse	107	(9)
2009–2012	Lecce	10	(0)
2011	→ Châteauroux (loan)	14	(6)
2012	→ AC Omonia (loan)	11	(1)
2012–2018	Tours	168	(25)
2018–2019	Thonon Evian (player-manager)		
Total		346	(45)

International career
1999	France U16	3	(0)
2001	France U18	1	(0)
2001–2005	France U21	21	(10)

Managerial career
- 2018–2019: Thonon Evian
- 2019–2021: Thonon Evian U19
- 2021–2024: Thonon Evian
- 2024–2025: Tours
- * Club domestic league appearances and goals

Bryan Bergougnoux (French pronunciation: [bʁajan bɛʁɡuɲu]; 12 January 1983 – 29 May 2026) was a French professional football manager and player. As a player, he was a midfielder.

== Club career ==
Born in Lyon, Bergougnoux began his career at his hometown club Lyon, where he was formed at a young age. His debut for the club came in a 2–0 defeat to Lens on 28 July 2001.

After 36 games for Lyon, in which he scored four goals, he was sold to Toulouse in 2005 for €3.5 million, on a four-year deal.

In August 2009, after his Toulouse contract had expired, he signed a three-year contract with Lecce of the Italian Serie B.

On 26 January 2012, he officially became a player of the Cyprus club AC Omonia, with that club having the right to transfer him to Nicosia in June.

In September 2012, Bergougnoux joined Tours on a one-year contract with an option for two further seasons. In July 2017, he agreed a contract extension until summer 2019 with the club.

In August 2018, Bergougnoux took up a dual role as player and coach at Régional 2 (7th-tier) side Thonon Evian.

== International career ==
Bergougnoux was a member of the France U21, for which he played 21 games and scored 10 goals. He won the Tournoi de Toulon with the team and finished as top scorer with 4 goals.

== Managerial career ==
After helping Thonon Evian won their group in the 2018–19 Régional 2, Bergougnoux retired from playing, and became the coach of Thonon Evian's U19 team. Two years later, in 2021, he returned managing the first team, helping the team finished as national champions in the 2021–22 National 3.

In August 2024, Bergougnoux was appointed as the head coach of Tours, his former team as a player. However, in February 2025, Tours disbanded in the middle of the season due to financial difficulties and forfeited all their remanining matches in the season.

In June 2025, Bergougnoux was named as the assistant coach for Didier Digard at Ligue 1 team Le Havre.

== Personal life and death ==
In December 2023, Bergougnoux was diagnosed with parotid cancer.

On 29 May 2026, while in Toulouse to play in a charity football tournament with former Toulouse players, Bergougnoux died following a sudden illness. He was 43, and survived by his wife and his four children.

== Honours ==
=== As players ===
Lyon

- Ligue 1: 2001–02, 2003–04, 2004–05
- Trophée des Champions: 2003, 2004

Lecce

- Serie B: 2009–10

Omonia

- Cypriot Cup: 2011–12

France U21

- Tournoi de Toulon: 2004

Individual

- Tournoi de Toulon top scorer: 2004

=== As manager ===
Thonon Evian

- Championnat National 3: 2021–22
