= Stade de la Vallée du Cher =

Football stadium in Tours, France

Coordinates: 47°22′33.93″N 0°43′42.32″E

La Vallée du Cher
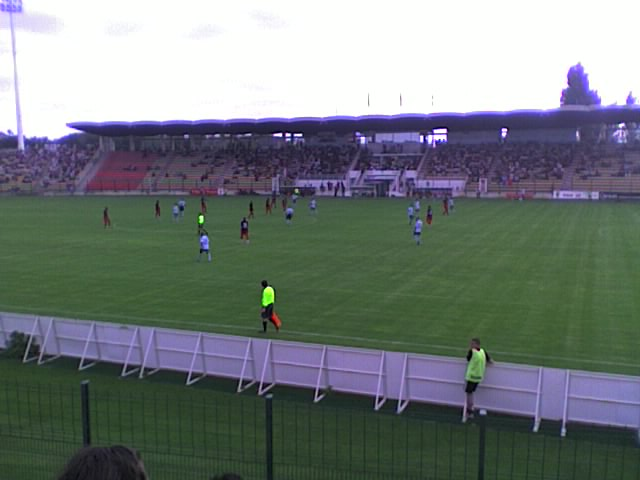
- Interactive map of La Vallée du Cher
- Full name: Stade de la Vallée du Cher
- Location: Rue Camille Danguillaume, 37000, Tours, France
- Capacity: 16,247
- Surface: Grass

Construction
- Opened: 2 September 1978
- Renovated: 2006 2007

Tenant
- Tours FC (1978–2025)

Stade de la Vallée du Cher (French pronunciation: [stad də la vale dy ʃɛʁ], "Cher Valley Stadium") is a multi-use stadium in Tours, France. It is currently used mostly for football matches and is the former home stadium of Tours FC, which was dissolved in February 2025. The stadium is able to hold 16,247 people and was built in 1978.
