= Yohann Rivière =

French footballer (born 1984)

Personal information
- Date of birth: 18 August 1984 (age 42)
- Place of birth: Pont-l'Abbé, France
- Height: 1.85 m (6 ft 1 in)
- Position: Forward

Youth career
- 1999–2003: Guingamp

Senior career*
| Years | Team | Apps | (Gls) |
| 2003–2009 | Guingamp | 120 | (27) |
| 2004 | → Istres (loan) | 16 | (2) |
| 2009–2010 | → Istres (loan) | 30 | (5) |
| 2010–2011 | Vannes | 17 | (2) |
| 2011–2014 | Le Havre | 105 | (31) |
| 2011 | Le Havre B | 1 | (0) |
| 2014–2017 | Dijon | 48 | (5) |
| 2015–2016 | Dijon B | 9 | (2) |
| 2017–2018 | US Créteil | 10 | (1) |
- * Club domestic league appearances and goals

Yohann Rivière (born 18 August 1984) is a French former footballer who played as a forward.

== Post-playing career ==
In 2020, he was hired as a scout by Dijon.

== Honours ==
=== Guingamp ===
- Coupe de France: 2009
