= List of French football transfers summer 2018 =

This is a list of French football transfers for the 2018 summer transfer window. Only transfers featuring Ligue 1 and Ligue 2 are listed.

== Ligue 1 ==
Note: Flags indicate national team as has been defined under FIFA eligibility rules. Players may hold more than one non-FIFA nationality.

=== Amiens ===
In:

No.	Pos.	Nation	Player
4	DF	SWE	Emil Krafth (on loan from (Italy) Bologna)
5	MF	FRA	Eddy Gnahoré (on loan from (Italy) Palermo)
7	FW	IRN	Saman Ghoddos (from (Sweden) Östersund)
8	MF	BRA	Ganso (on loan from (Spain) Sevilla)
11	FW	COL	Juan Ferney Otero (from (Argentina) Estudiantes)
16	GK	FRA	Matthieu Dreyer (from Caen)
21	MF	POL	Rafał Kurzawa (from (Poland) Górnik Zabrze)

Out:

No.	Pos.	Nation	Player
7	MF	COD	Harrison Manzala (to Angers)
8	MF	FRA	Guessouma Fofana (to Guingamp)
10	MF	FRA	Emmanuel Bourgaud (to Red Star)
11	FW	FRA	Jean-Luc Dompé (loan return to (Belgium) Standard Liège)
16	GK	FRA	Jean-Christophe Bouet (to Laval)
14	FW	COD	Gaël Kakuta (loan return to Hebei China Fortune)
18	FW	NCL	Georges Gope-Fenepej (to Le Mans)
21	MF	FRA	Charly Charrier (released)
23	DF	FRA	Julien Ielsch (retired)
25	DF	SEN	Issa Cissokho (released)
26	MF	CMR	Guy Ngosso (to Quevilly-Rouen)
28	FW	CIV	Lacina Traoré (loan return to Monaco)
35	DF	BRA	Danilo Avelar (loan return to (Italy) Torino)
37	MF	TOG	Serge Gakpé (released)
40	GK	FRA	Raphaël Adicéam (to Racing Colombes 92)
—	FW	GLP	Yannick Mamilonne (on loan to Paris, previously on loan at Quevilly-Rouen)
—	FW	FRA	Brighton Labeau (on loan to Villefranche, previously on loan at Créteil)
—	DF	FRA	Nathan Dekoke (to Avranches, previously on loan at Boulogne)
—	MF	FRA	Tanguy Ndombele (to Lyon, previously on loan)

=== Angers ===
In:

No.	Pos.	Nation	Player
2	DF	FRA	Rayan Aït-Nouri (from Angers youth)
6	MF	FRA	Vincent Pajot (from Saint-Étienne)
7	MF	COD	Harrison Manzala (from Amiens)
9	FW	ESP	Cristian López (from Lens)
13	FW	FRA	Dorian Bertrand (from Cholet)
17	MF	SEN	Cheikh Ndoye (on loan from (England) Birmingham City)
19	FW	CMR	Stéphane Bahoken (from Strasbourg)
22	MF	FRA	Jeff Reine-Adélaïde (from (England) Arsenal, previously on loan)
23	DF	FRA	Ibrahim Cissé (from Tours)
28	FW	ALG	Farid El Mellali (from (Algeria) Paradou)
—	GK	FRA	Zacharie Boucher (on loan from Auxerre)

Out:

No.	Pos.	Nation	Player
1	GK	FRA	Mathieu Michel (to Auxerre)
6	MF	CGO	Prince Oniangué (loan return to (England) Wolverhampton Wanderers)
7	FW	CMR	Karl Toko Ekambi (to (Spain) Villarreal)
10	FW	TOG	Gilles Sunu (to (Turkey) BB Erzurumspor)
12	MF	MLI	Lassana Coulibaly (on loan to (Scotland) Rangers)
14	MF	FRA	Billy Ketkeophomphone (to Auxerre)
19	FW	BEL	Baptiste Guillaume (on loan to Nîmes)
28	FW	SUI	Goran Karanović (released)
—	GK	FRA	Alexandre Letellier (on loan to Troyes, previously on loan at (Switzerland) Young Boys)
—	DF	FRA	Gabriel Mutombo (to Orléans, previously on loan)
—	FW	FRA	Enzo Crivelli (to Caen, previously on loan)
—	DF	ALG	Mehdi Tahrat (to Lens, previously on loan at Valenciennes)
—	MF	FRA	Mathias Serin (to Boulogne, previously on loan at Dunkerque)

=== Bordeaux ===
In:

No.	Pos.	Nation	Player
3	DF	ESP	Sergi Palencia (on loan from (Spain) Barcelona)
7	FW	FRA	Jimmy Briand (from Guingamp)
10	FW	NGA	Samuel Kalu (from (Belgium) Gent)
26	MF	CRO	Toma Bašić (from (Croatia) Hajduk Split)
—	MF	FRA	Yann Karamoh (on loan from (Italy) Inter Milan)
—	FW	DEN	Andreas Cornelius (on loan from (Italy) Atalanta)

Out:

No.	Pos.	Nation	Player
3	DF	GER	Diego Contento (to (Germany) Fortuna Düsseldorf)
7	FW	BRA	Malcom (to (Spain) Barcelona)
8	DF	FRA	Paul Baysse (on loan to Caen)
9	FW	DEN	Martin Braithwaite (loan return to Middlesbrough)
10	MF	FRA	Soualiho Meïté (loan return to AS Monaco)
22	MF	BRA	Jonathan Cafu (o loan to (Serbia) Red Star Belgrade)
24	FW	FRA	Gaëtan Laborde (to Montpellier)
26	DF	BEN	Olivier Verdon (to Sochaux)
—	GK	FRA	Paul Bernardoni (on loan to Nîmes, previously on loan at Clermont)
—	MF	ARG	Daniel Mancini (on loan to Auxerre, previously on loan at Tours)
—	FW	GAB	Aaron Boupendza (on loan to Gazélec Ajaccio, previously on loan at Pau)
—	FW	URU	Diego Rolán (to (Spain) Deportivo La Coruña, previously on loan at (Spain) Málaga)

=== Caen ===
In:

No.	Pos.	Nation	Player
1	GK	FRA	Erwin Zelazny (from Troyes)
2	DF	FRA	Paul Baysse (on loan from Bordeaux)
6	MF	CGO	Prince Oniangué (from (England) Wolverhampton Wanderers, previously on loan at Angers)
11	FW	CHA	Casimir Ninga (from Montpellier)
12	FW	FRA	Claudio Beauvue (on loan from (Spain) Celta Vigo, previously on loan at (Spain) Leganés)
14	DF	FRA	Jonathan Gradit (from Tours)
18	FW	MAR	Yacine Bammou (from Nantes)
19	FW	FRA	Malik Tchokounté (from Paris)
27	FW	FRA	Enzo Crivelli (from Angers, previously on loan)
28	MF	MAR	Fayçal Fajr (from (Spain) Getafe)
—	MF	TUN	Saîf-Eddine Khaoui (on loan from Marseille, previously on loan at Troyes)

Out:

No.	Pos.	Nation	Player
1	GK	FRA	Rémy Vercoutre (retired)
3	DF	FRA	Florian Le Joncour (to Concarneau)
7	MF	FIN	Timo Stavitski (on loan to (Croatia) Osijek)
10	MF	MAR	Youssef Aït Bennasser (loan return to Monaco)
11	MF	FRA	Vincent Bessat (released)
12	FW	FRA	Ronny Rodelin (to Guingamp)
17	FW	COD	Jordan Nkololo (to (Romania) Hermannstadt)
18	MF	CGO	Durel Avounou (on loan to Orléans)
19	MF	FRA	Jordan Leborgne (released)
20	MF	HAI	Hervé Bazile (to Le Havre)
25	MF	FRA	Julien Féret (to Auxerre)
26	FW	CRO	Ivan Santini (to (Belgium) Anderlecht)
28	DF	FRA	Damien Da Silva (to Rennes)
40	GK	FRA	Matthieu Dreyer (to Amiens)
—	MF	FRA	Valentin Voisin (on loan to Dunkerque, previously on loan at Avranches)
—	FW	SEN	Pape Sané (on loan to Nancy, previously on loan at Auxerre)

=== Dijon ===
In:

No.	Pos.	Nation	Player
1	GK	ISL	Rúnar Alex Rúnarsson (from (Denmark) Nordsjælland)
2	DF	FRA	Mickaël Alphonse (from Sochaux)
4	DF	MAR	Nayef Aguerd (from (Morocco) FUS Rabat)
10	MF	TUN	Naïm Sliti (from Lille, previously on loan)
23	MF	GUI	Jules Keita (from Bastia)
28	MF	FRA	Yoann Gourcuff (from Rennes)
—	DF	BEL	Laurent Ciman (from (United States) Los Angeles FC)

Out:

No.	Pos.	Nation	Player
1	GK	FRA	Benjamin Leroy (to Ajaccio)
2	DF	HUN	Ádám Lang (to (Romania) CFR Cluj, previously on loan at Nancy)
4	DF	SEN	Papy Djilobodji (end of loan from (England) Sunderland)
8	DF	POR	Xeka (end of loan from Lille)
21	MF	FRA	Eden Massouema (on loan to Valenciennes)
23	DF	SUI	Vincent Rüfli (to Paris FC)
24	MF	CGO	Dylan Bahamboula (to (Romania) Astra Giurgiu, previously on loan at Gazélec Ajaccio)
27	DF	FRA	Cédric Varrault (retired)
30	GK	FRA	Baptiste Reynet (to Toulouse)
—	GK	FRA	Enzo Basilio (to Concarneau, previously on loan at Rodez)
—	MF	FRA	Jessy Benet (to Grenoble, previously on loan)

=== Guingamp ===
In:

No.	Pos.	Nation	Player
18	MF	FRA	Guessouma Fofana (from Amiens)
23	FW	FRA	Ronny Rodelin (from Caen)
25	DF	FRA	Cheik Traoré (end of loan to Châteauroux)
26	FW	FRA	Nolan Roux (from Metz)
—	DF	FRA	Sikou Niakaté (from Valenciennes)

Out:

No.	Pos.	Nation	Player
5	MF	SEN	Mustapha Diallo (to Nîmes)
6	MF	FRA	Clément Grenier (to Rennes)
19	FW	FRA	Yannis Salibur (on loan to Saint-Etienne)
22	DF	FRA	Jonathan Martins Pereira (to Lorient)
23	FW	FRA	Jimmy Briand (to Bordeaux)
26	MF	FRA	Thibault Giresse (retired)
—	GK	FRA	Théo Guivarch (on loan to Cholet, previously on loan at Concarneau)
—	DF	FRA	Sikou Niakaté (on loan to Valenciennes)
—	MF	FRA	Jérémy Livolant (on loan to Châteauroux, previously on loan at Boulogne)

=== Lille ===
In:

No.	Pos.	Nation	Player
2	DF	FRA	Jérémy Pied (from (England) Southampton)
6	DF	POR	José Fonte (from (China) Dalian Yifang)
7	MF	POR	Rafael Leão (from (Portugal) Sporting CP)
8	MF	POR	Xeka (end of loan to Dijon)
9	FW	FRA	Loïc Rémy (from (Spain) Las Palmas, previously on loan at (Spain) Getafe)
12	FW	FRA	Jonathan Ikone (from Paris Saint-Germain, previously on loan at Montpellier)
14	FW	FRA	Jonathan Bamba (from AS Saint-Etienne)
17	DF	TUR	Zeki Çelik (from (Turkey) İstanbulspor)
21	MF	SRB	Arton Zekaj (from (Serbia) Sopot)
—	DF	TOG	Hakim Ouro-Sama (from Togo-Port)
—	FW	POR	Rui Fonte (on loan from (England) Fulham)

Out:

No.	Pos.	Nation	Player
2	DF	FRA	Kevin Malcuit (to (Italy) Napoli)
3	DF	PAR	Junior Alonso (on loan to (Spain) Celta Vigo)
7	MF	NED	Anwar El Ghazi (on loan to (England) Aston Villa)
9	FW	ARG	Ezequiel Ponce (end of loan from (Italy) Roma)
10	MF	ALG	Yassine Benzia (on loan to (Turkey) Fenerbahçe)
18	FW	RSA	Lebo Mothiba (to Strasbourg)
21	MF	MLI	Yves Bissouma (to (England) Brighton)
27	DF	MAR	Hamza Mendyl (to (Germany) Schalke 04)
29	MF	MLI	Rominigue Kouamé (on loan to Paris FC)
—	GK	FRA	Jean Butez (to (Belgium) Mouscron, previously on loan)
—	DF	ZAM	Stoppila Sunzu (to Metz, previously on loan at (Russia) Arsenal Tula)
—	DF	FRA	Ruben Droehnle (on loan to Orléans)
—	FW	POR	Eder (to (Russia) Lokomotiv Moscow, previously on loan)

=== Lyon ===
In:

No.	Pos.	Nation	Player
5	DF	BEL	Jason Denayer (from (England) Manchester City)
7	FW	FRA	Martin Terrier (end of loan to Strasbourg)
14	DF	FRA	Léo Dubois (from Nantes)
26	DF	FRA	Oumar Solet (from Laval, previously on loan)
28	MF	FRA	Tanguy Ndombele (from Amiens, previously on loan)
—	FW	FRA	Moussa Dembélé (from (Scotland) Celtic Glasgow)
—	FW	FRA	Lenny Pintor (from Brest)
—	FW	ENG	Reo Griffiths (from (England) Tottenham Hotspur)

Out:

No.	Pos.	Nation	Player
5	DF	FRA	Mouctar Diakhaby (to (Spain) Valencia)
9	FW	ESP	Mariano Díaz (to (Spain) Real Madrid)
17	FW	FRA	Myziane Maolida (to Nice)
—	DF	CMR	Nicolas N'Koulou (to (Italy) Torino, previously on loan)
—	DF	FRA	Louis Nganioni (to (Bulgaria) Levski Sofia)
—	MF	FRA	Timothé Cognat (on loan to (Switzerland) Servette FC)
—	MF	FRA	Elisha Owusu (on loan to Sochaux)
—	MF	ESP	Sergi Darder (to (Spain) Espanyol, previously on loan)
—	MF	FRA	Romain Del Castillo (to Rennes, previously on loan at Nîmes)
—	MF	LUX	Christopher Martins Pereira (on loan to Troyes, previously on loan at Bourg-Péronnas)
—	FW	FRA	Jean-Philippe Mateta (to (Germany) Mainz 05, previously on loan at Le Havre)
—	FW	FRA	Aldo Kalulu (to (Switzerland) Basel, previously on loan at Sochaux)
—	FW	FRA	Willem Geubbels (to Monaco)

=== Marseille ===
In:

No.	Pos.	Nation	Player
7	MF	SRB	Nemanja Radonjić (from (Serbia) Red Star Belgrade)
15	DF	CRO	Duje Ćaleta-Car (from (Austria) RB Salzburg)
18	DF	FRA	Jordan Amavi (from (England) Aston Villa, previously on loan)
25	DF	SVK	Tomáš Hubočan (end of loan to (Turkey) Trabzonspor)
—	DF	FRA	Dembo Gassama (from Bergerac)
—	MF	NED	Kevin Strootman (from (Italy) Roma)

Out:

No.	Pos.	Nation	Player
3	DF	BRA	Dória (to (Mexico) Santos Laguna, previously on loan at (Turkey) Yeni Malatyaspor)
7	MF	FRA	Rémy Cabella (to Saint-Etienne, previously on loan)
12	DF	CMR	Henri Bedimo (released)
24	MF	TUN	Saîf-Eddine Khaoui (on loan to Caen, previously on loan at Troyes)
29	MF	CMR	André-Frank Zambo Anguissa (to (England) Fulham)
—	FW	TUR	Yusuf Sari (on loan to Clermont)

=== Monaco ===
In:

No.	Pos.	Nation	Player
3	DF	ITA	Antonio Barreca (from (Italy) Torino)
4	MF	CIV	Jean-Eudes Aholou (from Strasbourg)
13	FW	FRA	Willem Geubbels (from Lyon)
15	MF	MAR	Youssef Aït Bennasser (end of loan to Caen)
17	MF	RUS	Aleksandr Golovin (from (Russia) CSKA Moscow)
18	DF	FRA	Ronaël Pierre-Gabriel (from Saint-Etienne)
20	MF	BEL	Nacer Chadli (from (England) West Bromwich)
28	MF	GNB	Pelé (from (Portugal) Rio Ave)
29	FW	FRA	Samuel Grandsir (from Troyes)
39	DF	GER	Benjamin Henrichs (from (Germany) Bayer Leverkusen)
—	DF	FRA	Jordy Gaspar (end of loan to (Belgium) Cercle Brugge)

Out:

No.	Pos.	Nation	Player
2	MF	BRA	Fabinho (to (England) Liverpool)
4	DF	NED	Terence Kongolo (to (England) Huddersfield Town, previously on loan)
6	DF	BRA	Jorge (on loan to (Portugal) FC Porto)
7	MF	ALG	Rachid Ghezzal (to (England) Leicester City)
8	MF	POR	João Moutinho (to (England) Wolverhampton)
14	FW	SEN	Keita Baldé (on loan to (Italy) Inter Milan)
15	FW	FRA	Adama Diakhaby (to (England) Huddersfield Town)
26	MF	BRA	Gabriel Boschilia (on loan to Nantes)
27	MF	FRA	Thomas Lemar (to (Spain) Atlético de Madrid)
—	DF	CMR	Pierre-Daniel N'Guinda (on loan to (Belgium) Cercle Brugge, previously on loan at Quevilly-Rouen)
—	MF	FRA	Soualiho Meïté (to (Italy) Torino, previously on loan at Bordeaux)
—	MF	POR	Gil Dias (on loan to (England) Nottingham Forest, previously on loan at (Italy) Fiorentina)
—	MF	FRA	Jonathan Mexique (on loan to Cholet, previously on loan at Tours)
—	MF	BEL	Adrien Bongiovanni (on loan to (Belgium) Cercle Brugge)
—	FW	FRA	Kylian Mbappé (to Paris Saint-Germain, previously on loan)

=== Montpellier ===
In:

No.	Pos.	Nation	Player
6	MF	FRA	Junior Sambia (from Niort, previously on loan)
10	FW	FRA	Gaëtan Laborde (from Bordeaux)
11	FW	FRA	Andy Delort (on loan from Toulouse)
14	DF	FRA	Damien Le Tallec (from (Serbia) Red Star Belgrade)
25	MF	FRA	Florent Mollet (from Metz)
27	MF	URU	Facundo Píriz (from (Russia) Akhmat Grozny, previously on loan)
30	GK	FRA	Jonathan Ligali (end of loan to Dunkerque)
32	FW	SRB	Petar Škuletić (from (Turkey) Gençlerbirliği)

Out:

No.	Pos.	Nation	Player
1	GK	FRA	Laurent Pionnier (retired)
9	FW	FRA	Jonathan Ikone (end of loan from Paris Saint-Germain)
18	FW	BEL	Isaac Mbenza (on loan to (England) Huddersfield Town)
23	DF	FRA	Nordi Mukiele (to (Germany) RB Leipzig)
24	DF	FRA	Jérôme Roussillon (to (Germany) VfL Wolfsburg)
29	FW	CHA	Casimir Ninga (to Caen)

=== Nantes ===
In:

No.	Pos.	Nation	Player
2	DF	BRA	Fábio (from (England) Middlesbrough)
5	DF	SEN	Kara Mbodji (on loan from (Belgium) Anderlecht)
10	FW	GHA	Majeed Waris (on loan from (Portugal) FC Porto)
13	DF	USA	Matt Miazga (on loan from (England) Chelsea, previously on loan at (Netherlands) Vitesse Arnhem)
14	DF	MLI	Charles Traoré (from Troyes)
16	GK	FRA	Alexandre Olliero (end of loan to Niort)
17	MF	BRA	Lucas Evangelista (from (Italy) Udinese, previously on loan at (Portugal) Estoril)
21	MF	SVN	Rene Krhin (from (Spain) Granada, previously on loan)
22	MF	BEL	Anthony Limbombe (from (Belgium) Club Brugge)
—	DF	COD	Anthony Walongwa (end of loan to Grenoble)
—	MF	NED	Queensy Menig (end of loan to (England) Oldham)

Out:

No.	Pos.	Nation	Player
5	DF	CIV	Koffi Djidji (on loan to (Italy) Torino)
8	MF	FRA	Adrien Thomasson (to Strasbourg)
10	FW	MAR	Yacine Bammou (to Caen)
12	DF	NGA	Chidozie Awaziem (end of loan from (Portugal) FC Porto)
14	MF	BEL	Yassine El Ghanassy (on loan to (Saudi Arabia) Al-Raed)
15	DF	FRA	Léo Dubois (to Lyon)
20	MF	CGO	Jules Iloki (released)
22	FW	BFA	Prejuce Nakoulma (released)
—	FW	POL	Mariusz Stępiński (to (Italy) Chievo Verona, previously on loan)

=== Nice ===
In:

No.	Pos.	Nation	Player
1	GK	TUN	Mouez Hassen (end of loan to Châteauroux)
3	DF	FRA	Gautier Lloris (end of loan to Gazélec Ajaccio)
3	MF	FRA	Rémi Walter (end of loan to Troyes)
20	DF	ALG	Youcef Attal (from (Belgium) Kortrijk)
21	MF	BRA	Danilo Barbosa (from (Portugal) Braga)
26	FW	FRA	Myziane Maolida (from Lyon)
28	DF	FRA	Olivier Boscagli (end of loan to Nîmes)
29	DF	FRA	Christophe Hérelle (from Troyes)

Out:

No.	Pos.	Nation	Player
2	DF	FRA	Arnaud Souquet (to (Belgium) Gent)
4	DF	BRA	Marlon (end of loan from (Spain) Barcelona)
6	MF	CIV	Jean Michaël Seri (to (England) Fulham)
8	MF	FRA	Arnaud Lusamba (on loan to (Belgium) Cercle Brugge)
14	FW	FRA	Alassane Pléa (to (Germany) Borussia Mönchengladbach)
19	MF	FRA	Vincent Marcel (on loan to Troyes)
20	DF	FRA	Maxime Le Marchand (to (England) Fulham)
22	MF	FRA	Nampalys Mendy (end of loan from (England) Leicester City)
—	DF	FRA	Romain Perraud (on loan to Paris FC)
—	MF	ALG	Saïd Benrahma (to (England) Brentford, previously on loan at Châteauroux)

=== Nîmes ===
In:

No.	Pos.	Nation	Player
2	MF	SEN	Mustapha Diallo (from Guingamp)
5	DF	FRA	Loïck Landre (from (Italy) Genoa)
10	FW	GAB	Denis Bouanga (from Lorient)
25	FW	BEL	Baptiste Guillaume (on loan from Angers)
26	DF	FRA	Florian Miguel (from Tours)
27	DF	CIV	Hervé Lybohy (from Paris FC)
30	GK	FRA	Paul Bernardoni (on loan from Bordeaux, previously on loan at Clermont)
—	DF	FRA	Faitout Maouassa (on loan from Rennes)

Out:

No.	Pos.	Nation	Player
3	DF	ALG	Liassine Cadamuro (to (Spain) Gimnàstic de Tarragona)
4	DF	FRA	Fabien Garcia (released)
10	MF	FRA	Romain Del Castillo (end of loan from Lyon)
28	DF	FRA	Olivier Boscagli (end of loan from Nice)
40	GK	FRA	Yan Marillat (to Béziers)

=== Paris Saint-Germain ===
In:

No.	Pos.	Nation	Player
1	GK	ITA	Gianluigi Buffon (from (Italy) Juventus)
4	DF	GER	Thilo Kehrer (from (Germany) Schalke 04)
7	FW	FRA	Kylian Mbappé (from Monaco, previously on loan)
14	DF	ESP	Juan Bernat (from (Germany) Bayern Munich)
17	FW	CMR	Eric Maxim Choupo-Moting (from (England) Stoke City)
22	FW	ESP	Jesé (end of loan to (England) Stoke City)
—	DF	FRA	Alec Georgen (end of loan to (Netherlands) AZ Alkmaar)

Out:

No.	Pos.	Nation	Player
1	GK	GER	Kevin Trapp (on loan to (Germany) Eintracht Frankfurt)
4	MF	POL	Grzegorz Krychowiak (on loan to (Russia) Lokomotiv Moscow, end of loan to (England) West Bromwich)
8	MF	ITA	Thiago Motta (retired)
15	FW	POR	Gonçalo Guedes (to (Spain) Valencia, previously on loan)
17	DF	ESP	Yuri Berchiche (to (Spain) Athletic Bilbao)
18	MF	ARG	Giovani Lo Celso (on loan to (Spain) Real Betis)
21	FW	FRA	Hatem Ben Arfa (to Rennes)
27	MF	ARG	Javier Pastore (to (Italy) Roma)
40	GK	FRA	Rémy Descamps (end of loan to Clermont, previously on loan at Tours)
—	MF	FRA	Lorenzo Callegari (to (Italy) Genoa)
—	FW	FRA	Odsonne Édouard (to (Scotland) Celtic, previously on loan)
—	FW	FRA	Jonathan Ikone (to Lille, previously on loan at Montpellier)
—	FW	FRA	Jean-Christophe Bahebeck (to (Netherlands) Utrecht, previously on loan)

=== Reims ===
In:

No.	Pos.	Nation	Player
2	DF	BEL	Bjorn Engels (on loan from (Greece) Olympiacos)
3	DF	CIV	Ghislain Konan (from (Portugal) Vitória Guimarães)
4	MF	FRA	Tristan Dingome (from Troyes)
10	FW	KOR	Suk Hyun-jun (from Troyes)
11	MF	ENG	Sheyi Ojo (on loan from (England) Liverpool, previously on loan at (England) Fulham)
19	DF	MAD	Thomas Fontaine (from Clermont)
20	MF	TOG	Alaixys Romao (from (Greece) Olympiacos)
25	MF	MLI	Moussa Doumbia (from (Russia) Rostov)
27	FW	FRA	Virgile Pinson
32	DF	BEL	Thomas Foket (from (Belgium) Gent)
—	MF	TUR	Aksel Aktas (from Sochaux)

Out:

No.	Pos.	Nation	Player
9	FW	FRA	Theoson Siebatcheu (to Rennes)
10	MF	BRA	Diego Rigonato (to (United Arab Emirates) Al Dhafra)
11	FW	FRA	Grejohn Kyei (on loan to Lens)
14	MF	FRA	Grégory Berthier (on loan to Red Star)
20	DF	FRA	Samuel Bouhours (released)
21	MF	CPV	Danilson da Cruz (to Nancy)
23	DF	FRA	Julian Jeanvier (to (England) Brentford)
—	DF	FRA	Yohan Roche (on loan to Rodez)
—	DF	FRA	Lenny Vallier (on loan to Pau)

=== Rennes ===
In:

No.	Pos.	Nation	Player
3	DF	FRA	Damien Da Silva (from Caen)
6	MF	SWE	Jakob Johansson (from (Greece) AEK Athens)
8	MF	FRA	Clément Grenier (from Guingamp)
9	FW	FRA	Theoson Siebatcheu (from Reims)
10	MF	FRA	Rafik Guitane (end of loan to Le Havre)
11	FW	SEN	Mbaye Niang (on loan from (Italy) Torino)
18	FW	FRA	Hatem Ben Arfa (from Paris Saint-Germain)
22	MF	FRA	Romain Del Castillo (from Lyon, previously on loan at Nîmes)
28	MF	FRA	Denis Will Poha (end of loan to Orléans)

Out:

No.	Pos.	Nation	Player
5	DF	FRA	Joris Gnagnon (to (Spain) Sevilla)
8	MF	TUN	Wahbi Khazri (end of loan from (England) Sunderland)
10	MF	BIH	Sanjin Prcić (to (Spain) Levante)
11	FW	ESP	Brandon Thomas (on loan to (Spain) Osasuna)
17	MF	FRA	Faitout Maouassa (on loan to Nîmes)
18	MF	FRA	Morgan Amalfitano (released)
25	FW	SEN	Diafra Sakho (on loan to (Turkey) Bursaspor)
28	MF	FRA	Yoann Gourcuff (to Dijon)
—	DF	POR	Afonso Figueiredo (to (Portugal) Rio Ave, previously on loan at (Bulgaria) Levski Sofia)
—	FW	COD	Firmin Mubele (to Toulouse, previously on loan)
—	FW	FRA	Jordan Tell (on loan to Orléans, previously on loan at Valenciennes)
—	FW	FRA	Armand Laurienté (on loan to Orléans)

=== Saint-Étienne ===
In:

No.	Pos.	Nation	Player
5	DF	FRA	Timothée Kolodziejczak (on loan from (Mexico) Tigres UANL)
7	MF	FRA	Rémy Cabella (from Marseille, previously on loan)
9	FW	FRA	Loïs Diony (end of loan to (England) Bristol City)
10	MF	TUN	Wahbi Khazri (from (England) Sunderland, previously on loan at Rennes)
18	FW	FRA	Arnaud Nordin (end of loan to Nancy)
—	FW	FRA	Franck Honorat (from Clermont)
—	FW	FRA	Yannis Salibur (on loan from Guingamp)

Out:

No.	Pos.	Nation	Player
1	GK	FRA	Anthony Maisonnial (to (Switzerland) Sion)
2	DF	FRA	Kévin Théophile-Catherine (to (Croatia) Dinamo Zagreb)
4	DF	SUI	Léo Lacroix (end of loan to (Germany) Hamburg SV, previously on loan at (Switzerland) Basel)
5	MF	FRA	Vincent Pajot (to Angers)
10	MF	MAR	Oussama Tannane (on loan to (Netherlands) Utrecht)
13	MF	CIV	Habib Maïga (on loan to Metz, previously on loan at (Russia) Arsenal Tula)
14	FW	FRA	Jonathan Bamba (to Lille)
15	DF	SUI	Saidy Janko (to (Portugal) FC Porto)
18	MF	FRA	Paul-Georges Ntep (end of loan from (Germany) VfL Wolfsburg)
20	MF	BRA	Hernani (end of loan from (Russia) Zenit St Petersburg)
29	DF	FRA	Ronaël Pierre-Gabriel (to Monaco)
—	DF	GRE	Alexandros Katranis (on loan to (Belgium) Mouscron)
—	FW	FRA	Franck Honorat (on loan to Clermont)
—	FW	GNB	Jorginho (on loan to (Bulgaria) CSKA Sofia, previously on loan at (Portugal) Chaves)

=== Strasbourg ===
In:

No.	Pos.	Nation	Player
1	GK	BEL	Matz Sels (from (England) Newcastle, previously on loan at (Belgium) Anderlecht)
5	DF	CIV	Lamine Koné (on loan from (England) Sunderland)
12	FW	RSA	Lebo Mothiba (from Lille)
13	DF	SRB	Stefan Mitrović (from (Belgium) La Gantoise)
16	GK	JPN	Eiji Kawashima (from Metz)
18	MF	FRA	Ibrahima Sissoko (from Brest)
23	DF	FRA	Lionel Carole (from (Turkey) Galatasaray, previously on loan at (Spain) Sevilla)
25	FW	FRA	Ludovic Ajorque (from Clermont)
26	MF	FRA	Adrien Thomasson (from Nantes)

Out:

No.	Pos.	Nation	Player
1	GK	FRA	Landry Bonnefoi (to (Luxembourg) Dudelange)
2	DF	FRA	Dimitri Foulquier (end of loan from (Spain) Granada)
4	DF	BFA	Bakary Koné (end of loan from (Spain) Málaga)
8	MF	CIV	Jean-Eudes Aholou (to Monaco)
12	DF	SEN	Kader Mangane (retired)
13	GK	FRA	Jérémy Blayac (to Gazélec Ajaccio)
16	GK	FRA	Alexandre Oukidja (to Metz)
19	FW	CMR	Stéphane Bahoken (to Angers)
20	FW	FRA	Martin Terrier (end of loan from Lyon)
21	DF	GUF	Yoann Salmier (on loan to Troyes)
22	DF	GUI	Ernest Seka (to Nancy)
28	MF	FRA	Vincent Nogueira (to Annecy)

=== Toulouse ===
In:

No.	Pos.	Nation	Player
5	DF	FRA	Steven Moreira (from Lorient)
7	FW	CIV	Max-Alain Gradel (from (England) Bournemouth, previously on loan)
10	FW	BEL	Aaron Leya Iseka (from (Belgium) Anderlecht, previously on loan at (Belgium) Zulte-Waregem)
14	MF	TOG	Mathieu Dossevi (from Metz)
15	MF	TRI	John Bostock (from (Turkey) Bursaspor)
22	MF	ESP	Manu García (on loan from (England) Manchester City, previously on loan at (Netherlands) NAC Breda)
24	FW	COD	Firmin Mubele (from Rennes, previously on loan)
25	DF	CMR	Stéphane Mbia
30	GK	FRA	Baptiste Reynet (from Dijon)

Out:

No.	Pos.	Nation	Player
5	DF	FRA	Issa Diop (to (England) West Ham)
9	FW	FRA	Andy Delort (on loan to Montpellier)
11	FW	SWE	Ola Toivonen (to (Australia) Melbourne Victory)
13	DF	FRA	Clément Michelin (on loan to Ajaccio)
19	MF	BRA	Somália (to (Saudi Arabia) Al-Shabab)
25	MF	FRA	Giannelli Imbula (end of loan from (England) Stoke City)
40	GK	FRA	Alban Lafont (to (Italy) Fiorentina)

== Ligue 2 ==
=== Ajaccio ===
In:

No.	Pos.	Nation	Player
1	GK	FRA	Benjamin Leroy (from Dijon)
2	DF	FRA	Clément Michelin (on loan from Toulouse)
4	MF	FRA	Alliou Dembélé (from Niort)
9	FW	FRA	Joseph Mendes (from (England) Reading)
14	MF	ALB	Qazim Laci (from (Greece) Olympiacos, previously on loan)
20	MF	COM	Mohamed Youssouf (from (Greece) Levadiakos)
24	DF	FRA	Jérémy Choplin (from Niort)
—	MF	JPN	Naoto Sawai (on loan from (Japan) Tokyo Verdi)

Out:

No.	Pos.	Nation	Player
1	GK	COD	Riffi Mandanda (to Boulogne)
2	DF	GUI	Mady Camara (to (Greece) Olympiacos)
4	DF	FRA	Joris Sainati (to Lorient)
11	DF	COM	Faiz Selemani (end of loan from Lorient)
12	MF	MLI	Abdoulaye Keita (to (Greece) Panionios)
16	GK	FRA	Jean-Louis Leca (to Lens)
28	FW	NIG	Moussa Maazou (end of loan from Lens)

=== Auxerre ===
In:

No.	Pos.	Nation	Player
2	DF	HAI	Carlens Arcus (from (Belgium) Cercle Brugge, previously on loan)
7	MF	ARG	Daniel Mancini (on loan from Bordeaux, previously on loan at Tours)
9	FW	FRA	Yanis Merdji (from Bourg-en-Bresse)
15	MF	FRA	Loïc Goujon (end of loan to Boulogne)
18	MF	FRA	François Bellugou (from Troyes)
25	DF	FRA	Julien Féret (from Caen)
26	DF	FRA	Samuel Souprayen (from (Italy) Hellas Verona)
29	FW	FRA	Rémy Dugimont (from Clermont)
—	GK	FRA	Mathieu Michel (from Angers)
—	MF	FRA	Billy Ketkeophomphone (from Angers)

Out:

No.	Pos.	Nation	Player
1	GK	FRA	Zacharie Boucher (on loan to Angers)
6	DF	FRA	Brahim Konaté (to Niort)
7	FW	FRA	Ibrahim Sangaré (to (Turkey) Giresunspor)
9	FW	SEN	Pape Sané (loan return to Caen)
10	MF	POL	Ludovic Obraniak (released)
11	FW	FRA	Florian Ayé (to Clermont)
14	FW	FRA	François-Xavier Fumu Tamuzo (on loan to Quevilly-Rouen)
19	FW	FRA	Alexandre Vincent (to Laval)
22	FW	FRA	Romain Montiel (end of loan to Le Mans, previously on loan at Chambly)
26	FW	SVN	Ivan Firer (to (Slovenia) Rogaska)
29	DF	FRA	Evan Ndicka (to (Germany) Eintracht Frankfurt)
35	DF	SEN	Yaya Sané (end of loan from (Turkey) Bursaspor)

=== Béziers ===
In:

No.	Pos.	Nation	Player
2	MF	MAR	Faycal Rherras (from (Belgium) Mechelen, previously on loan at (Scotland) Hibernian)
3	DF	FRA	Loïc Kouagba (from Martigues)
4	MF	ALG	Mehdi Mostefa (from (Cyprus) Pafos)
12	MF	FRA	Joël Saki (from Lusitanos)
14	MF	CGO	Junior Etou (from Chasselay)
17	FW	FRA	Ibrahim Sissoko (on loan from Lorient)
19	DF	GUI	Ousmane Sidibé (from Paris FC)
27	FW	FRA	Alexandre Ramalingom (from Marignane Gignac)
40	GK	FRA	Yan Marillat (from Nîmes)
—	DF	FRA	Julien Boyer (from Canet)

Out:

No.	Pos.	Nation	Player
3	DF	FRA	Florian Lapis (to Niort)
5	MF	FRA	Francis Kembolo (to Sète)
11	FW	FRA	Kevin Colin (to Avranches)
14	MF	CGO	Randi Goteni (end of loan from Troyes)
17	FW	FRA	Ibrahim Sissoko (to Lorient)
19	MF	FRA	Ousmane Kanté (to Paris FC)
27	MF	FRA	Bryan Jean-Baptiste (to Marignane Gignac)
28	DF	FRA	Jonathan Martinez (to Saint-Priest)

=== Brest ===
In:

No.	Pos.	Nation	Player
7	MF	ALG	Haris Belkebla (from Tours)
8	MF	FRA	Yoann Court (from Bourg-Péronnas)
18	MF	FRA	Ibrahima Diallo (on loan from Monaco)
19	MF	FRA	Ferris N'Goma (from Orléans)
24	MF	FRA	Thomas Ayasse (from Le Havre)
25	DF	FRA	Corentin Jacob (end of loan to Bastia-Borgo)

Out:

No.	Pos.	Nation	Player
1	GK	GUF	Donovan Léon (released)
6	MF	FRA	Bruno Grougi (retired)
7	MF	FRA	Jason Berthomier (to Troyes)
8	MF	FRA	Johan Gastien (to Clermont)
18	DF	FRA	Zakarie Labidi (to (Tunisia) Club Africain)
26	FW	SEN	Habib Diallo (end of loan from Metz)
27	MF	FRA	Ibrahima Sissoko (to Strasbourg)
28	FW	FRA	Lenny Pintor (to Lyon)
29	MF	FRA	Alexandre Coeff (end of loan from (Italy) Udinese)
—	FW	CGO	Exauce Ngassaki (released)

=== Châteauroux ===
In:

No.	Pos.	Nation	Player
1	GK	VEN	José Contreras (on loan from (Venezuela) Deportivo Táchira)
2	DF	MLI	Moussa Soumaré (from (Switzerland) Chiasso)
6	MF	SEN	Sidy Sarr (from (Belgium) Kortrijk, previously on loan)
8	MF	FRA	Valentin Vanbaleghem (from Lille, previously on loan at Les Herbiers)
9	FW	MLI	Cheick Fantamady Diarra (from Tours)
10	MF	FRA	Jérémy Livolant (on loan from Guingamp, previously on loan at Boulogne)
17	DF	GUI	Sékou Condé (from (Russia) Amkar Perm)

Out:

No.	Pos.	Nation	Player
1	GK	FRA	Louis Souchaud (to Quevilly-Rouen)
2	DF	COM	Chaker Alhadhur (end of loan from Caen)
4	DF	FRA	Richard Samnick (to Quevilly-Rouen)
10	MF	ALG	Said Benrahma (end of loan from Nice)
23	FW	FRA	Yann Mabella (end of loan from Nancy)
27	DF	FRA	Cheik Traoré (end of loan from Guingamp)
40	GK	TUN	Mouez Hassen (end of loan from Nice)

=== Clermont ===
In:

No.	Pos.	Nation	Player
1	GK	FRA	Rémy Descamps (on loan from Paris Saint-Germain, previously on loan at Tours)
5	DF	FRA	Florent Ogier (from Sochaux)
7	MF	TUR	Yusuf Sari (on loan from Marseille)
9	FW	FRA	Franck Honorat (on loan from Saint-Etienne)
12	DF	COD	Vital N'Simba (from Bourg-Péronnas)
17	DF	GUF	Josué Albert (from Quevilly-Rouen)
21	FW	MAD	Faneva Andriatsima (from Le Havre)
25	MF	FRA	Johan Gastien (from Brest)
29	FW	FRA	Florian Aye (from Auxerre)

Out:

No.	Pos.	Nation	Player
5	DF	MAD	Thomas Fontaine (to Reims)
7	DF	FRA	Nicolas Gavory (to (Netherlands) Utrecht)
8	MF	SEN	Joseph Lopy (to Orléans)
9	FW	FRA	Franck Honorat (to Saint-Etienne)
17	DF	ALG	Karim Djellabi (retired)
18	DF	FRA	Fabien Centonze (to Lens)
21	FW	FRA	Rémy Dugimont (to Auxerre)
24	FW	FRA	Romain Spano (on loan to Bourg-Péronnas)
25	FW	FRA	Ludovic Ajorque (to Strasbourg)
40	GK	FRA	Paul Bernardoni (loan return to Bordeaux)

=== Gazélec ===
In:

No.	Pos.	Nation	Player
3	DF	GUI	Fodé Camara (from Bastia)
8	MF	FRA	Jimmy Roye (from Niort)
12	MF	SEN	Mayoro N'Doye (from Tours)
13	FW	FRA	Jérémy Blayac (from Strasbourg)
17	FW	GAB	Aaron Boupendza (on loan from Bordeaux, previously on loan at Pau)
18	DF	FRA	Dominique Guidi (from Furiani)
20	DF	FRA	Julian Palmieri (from Metz)
28	MF	FRA	Jean-Baptiste Pierazzi (from (Cyprus) Alki Oroklini)
30	GK	FRA	David Oberhauser

Out:

No.	Pos.	Nation	Player
4	DF	FRA	Gautier Lloris (end of loan from Nice)
5	DF	FRA	Jérémie Bréchet (retired)
7	MF	CGO	Dylan Bahamboula (end of loan from Dijon)
9	FW	SRB	Dalibor Veselinović (released)
20	MF	FRA	Olivier Kemen (end of loan from Lyon)
22	DF	MAD	Jérôme Mombris (to Grenoble)
23	MF	COM	Youssouf M'Changama (to Grenoble)
29	DF	FRA	François Clerc (retired)
30	GK	FRA	Steeve Elana (to Tours)

=== Grenoble ===
In:

No.	Pos.	Nation	Player
3	DF	FRA	Nicolas Taravel (from (Cyprus) Pafos)
6	MF	BEL	Ryan Sanusi (from (Netherlands) Sparta Rotterdam)
10	MF	COM	Youssouf M'Changama (from Gazélec Ajaccio)
15	DF	MAD	Fabien Boyer (from Créteil)
18	MF	GEO	Jaba Jighauri (from (Kazakhstan) Aktobe, previously on loan at (Kazakhstan) Ordabasy)
21	MF	FRA	Jessy Benet (from Dijon, previously on loan)
23	DF	MAD	Jérôme Mombris (from Gazélec Ajaccio)
30	GK	FRA	Esteban Salles (from Les Herbiers)

Out:

No.	Pos.	Nation	Player
3	DF	FRA	Bassiri Keita (to Martigues)
6	MF	FRA	Steven Pinto Borges (to (Belgium) RUSG)
10	MF	FRA	Raphaël Gherardi (to (Switzerland) Yverdon)
11	FW	FRA	Florian David (on loan to Rodez, previously on loan at Les Herbiers)
17	DF	COD	Anthony Walongwa (end of loan from Nantes)
20	DF	CGO	Fernand Mayembo (to Le Havre)

=== Le Havre ===
In:

No.	Pos.	Nation	Player
2	DF	BRA	Léo Príncipe (on loan from (Brazil) Corinthians)
3	DF	FRA	Kelly Irep (end of loan to Concarneau)
5	DF	CGO	Fernand Mayembo (from Grenoble)
11	FW	ZIM	Tino Kadewere (from (Sweden) Djurgården)
14	FW	SEN	Jamal Thiare (from Avranches)
27	MF	FRA	Romain Basque (from Quevilly-Rouen)
29	FW	HAI	Hervé Bazile (from Caen)

Out:

No.	Pos.	Nation	Player
5	MF	FRA	Thomas Ayasse (to Brest)
9	FW	MLI	Mana Dembélé (released)
11	FW	FRA	Jean-Philippe Mateta (end of loan from Lyon)
19	MF	FRA	Dylan Louiserre (to Niort)
27	MF	FRA	Rafik Guitane (end of loan from Rennes)
30	GK	FRA	Alexandre Marfaing (to Cholet)
32	FW	MAD	Faneva Andriatsima (to Clermont)
—	FW	NED	Tarik Tissoudali (to (Belgium) Beerschot Wilrijk, previously on loan at (Netherlands) De Graafschap)

=== Lens ===
In:

No.	Pos.	Nation	Player
4	DF	TUN	Seif Teka (from (Tunisia) Club Africain)
5	DF	ALG	Mehdi Tahrat (from Angers, previously on loan at Valenciennes)
7	MF	FRA	El Hadji Ba (from Sochaux)
8	MF	MLI	Souleymane Diarra (from (Hungary) Újpest, previously on loan)
9	FW	FRA	Thierry Ambrose (on loan from (England) Manchester City, previously on loan at (Netherlands) NAC Breda)
14	FW	SEN	Yannick Gomis (from Orléans)
16	GK	FRA	Jean-Louis Leca (from Ajaccio)
18	DF	FRA	Fabien Centonze (from Clermont)
19	DF	SEN	Arial Mendy (from (Senegal) Diambars)
20	MF	MAR	Achraf Bencharki (on loan from (Saudi Arabia) Al-Hilal)
21	DF	FRA	Massadio Haïdara (from (England) Newcastle)
25	FW	NIG	Moussa Maazou (end of loan to Ajaccio)
26	DF	SRB	Aleksandar Radovanović (from (Serbia) Vojvodina)
27	MF	BEL	Guillaume Gillet (from (Greece) Olympiacos)
29	FW	FRA	Grejohn Kyei (on loan from Reims)
—	MF	SEN	Ansou Sow (from (Senegal) Jaraaf)
—	FW	FRA	Simon Banza (end of loan to (Luxembourg) Titus Pétange)

Out:

No.	Pos.	Nation	Player
3	DF	SRB	Dušan Cvetinović (to (Japan) Yokohama F. Marinos)
4	MF	BEN	Djiman Koukou (released)
5	DF	AUS	Alex Gersbach (end of loan from (Norway) Rosenborg)
9	FW	ESP	Cristian López (to Angers)
11	MF	FRA	Abdellah Zoubir (to (Azerbaijan) Qarabağ)
13	FW	FRA	Kévin Fortuné (to Troyes)
14	DF	MLI	Mohamed Fofana (retired)
16	GK	FRA	Nicolas Douchez (to Red Star)
19	DF	FRA	Frédéric Duplus (to (Belgium) Leuven)
20	MF	FRA	Abdelrafik Gérard (to (Belgium) RUSG)
23	DF	EGY	Karim Hafez (end of loan from (Belgium) Lierse)
24	FW	CRO	Ivan Lendric (to (Slovenia) Olimpija)
26	DF	CIV	Brice Dja Djedje (end of loan from (England) Watford)
28	MF	FRA	Thomas Ephestion (to Orléans)
29	MF	FRA	Clément Chantôme (end of loan from Rennes)
35	DF	FRA	William Bianda (to (Italy) Roma)
—	FW	FRA	Guillaume Beghin (on loan to Boulogne)

=== Lorient ===
In:

No.	Pos.	Nation	Player
2	DF	FRA	Houboulang Mendes (from Laval)
4	DF	FRA	Joris Sainati (from Ajaccio)
7	DF	FRA	Jonathan Martins Pereira (from Guingamp)
8	MF	CMR	Malcolm Edjouma (end of loan to Concarneau)
20	DF	FRA	Matthieu Saunier (from (Spain) Granada)
29	MF	FRA	Valentin Lavigne (end of loan to Paris FC)
—	MF	BEL	Jason Lokilo (on loan from (England) Crystal Palace)
—	FW	FRA	Ibrahim Sissoko (from Béziers)

Out:

No.	Pos.	Nation	Player
3	DF	FRA	Quentin Lecoeuche (on loan to Orléans)
4	MF	FRA	Matteo Guendouzi (to (England) Arsenal)
5	DF	SEN	Zargo Touré (to (Turkey) Trabzonspor)
7	MF	FRA	Arnold Mvuemba (released)
8	MF	FRA	Gaël Danic (to Laval)
11	DF	COM	Faiz Selemani (to (Belgium) RUSG, previously on loan at Ajaccio)
16	GK	FRA	Paul Delecroix (to Metz)
20	DF	FRA	Steven Moreira (to Toulouse)
23	DF	FRA	Mathieu Peybernes (on loan to (Spain) Sporting de Gijón, previously on loan at (Belgium) Eupen)
26	FW	GAB	Denis Bouanga (to Nîmes)
32	DF	GUI	Ibrahima Conte (on loan to Niort)
—	DF	CGO	Bradley Mazikou (on loan to Cholet, previously on loan at Dunkerque)
—	FW	GHA	Majeed Waris (to (Portugal) FC Porto)
—	FW	FRA	Ibrahim Sissoko (on loan to Béziers)

=== Metz ===
In:

No.	Pos.	Nation	Player
1	GK	FRA	Paul Delecroix (from Lorient)
2	MF	CPV	Jamiro Monteiro (from (Netherlands) Heracles Almelo)
5	MF	CIV	Victorien Angban (on loan from (England) Chelsea, previously on loan at (Belgium) Waasland-Beveren)
6	DF	MLI	Mamadou Fofana (from (Turkey) Alanyaspor)
8	MF	FRA	Gauthier Hein (end of loan to Tours)
9	FW	MLI	Adama Traoré (from (Democratic Republic of the Congo) TP Mazembe)
10	MF	FRA	Marvin Gakpa (from Quevilly-Rouen)
13	DF	ZAM	Stoppila Sunzu (from Lille, previously on loan at (Russia) Arsenal Tula)
16	GK	FRA	Alexandre Oukidja (from Strasbourg)
17	DF	FRA	Thomas Delaine (from Paris FC)
19	MF	CIV	Habib Maïga (on loan from Saint-Etienne, previously on loan at (Russia) Arsenal Tula)
20	FW	SEN	Habib Diallo (end of loan to Brest)
21	DF	GHA	John Boye (from (Turkey) Sivasspor)
27	MF	FRA	Farid Boulaya (from (Spain) Girona, previously on loan)
31	DF	LUX	Laurent Jans (from (Belgium) Waasland-Beveren)

Out:

No.	Pos.	Nation	Player
1	GK	FRA	Thomas Didillon (to (Belgium) Anderlecht)
2	DF	SEN	Fallou Diagne (end of loan from (Germany) Werder Bremen)
4	MF	SRB	Milan Biševac (to (Luxembourg) Dudelange)
8	MF	FRA	Yann Jouffre
9	FW	FRA	Nolan Roux (to Guingamp)
10	MF	BIH	Danijel Milićević (end of loan from (Belgium) La Gantoise)
14	MF	CMR	Georges Mandjeck (end of loan from (Czech Republic) Sparta Praha)
16	GK	JPN	Eiji Kawashima (to Strasbourg)
19	MF	FRA	Florent Mollet (to Montpellier)
20	DF	FRA	Julian Palmieri (to Gazélec Ajaccio)
21	DF	FRA	Moussa Niakhate (to (Germany) Mainz 05)
30	GK	FRA	Quentin Beunardeau (to (Portugal) Aves)
32	DF	CMR	Benoît Assou-Ekotto
—	MF	FRA	Lucas Toussaint (to Quevilly-Rouen, previously on loan at Pau)

=== Nancy ===
In:

No.	Pos.	Nation	Player
12	DF	FRA	Loris Néry (from Valenciennes)
14	FW	FRA	Yann Mabella (end of loan to Châteauroux)
15	FW	SEN	Pape Sané (on loan from Caen, previously on loan at Auxerre)
18	DF	FRA	Nicolas Saint-Ruf (end of loan to Bourg-Péronnas)
21	DF	FRA	Séga Coulibaly (from Rennes)
22	DF	GUI	Ernest Seka (from Strasbourg)
28	MF	CPV	Danilson da Cruz (from Reims)

Out:

No.	Pos.	Nation	Player
5	DF	TUN	Alaeddine Yahia (released)
11	MF	FRA	Arnaud Nordin (end of loan from Saint-Etienne)
14	DF	FRA	Joffrey Cuffaut (to Valenciennes)
15	FW	MAR	Youssouf Hadji (retired)
20	DF	MAR	Michaël Chrétien (released)
22	DF	HUN	Ádám Lang (end of loan from Dijon)
24	FW	SVN	Patrik Eler (on loan to (Austria) Wacker Innsbruck)
28	DF	FRA	Julien Cétout (to (Israel) Hapoel Be'er Sheva)

=== Niort ===
In:

No.	Pos.	Nation	Player
3	DF	FRA	Florian Lapis (from Béziers)
4	DF	FRA	Dylan Fontani (from Toulon)
6	MF	FRA	Dylan Louiserre (from Le Havre)
15	DF	GUI	Ibrahima Conte (on loan from Lorient)
16	GK	FRA	Florent Maddaloni (from Martigues)
17	FW	GAB	Louis Ameka Autchanga (from (Gabon) Mounana)
18	MF	FRA	Valentin Jacob (from Annecy)
19	MF	FRA	Zakaria Grich (end of loan to Dunkerque)
20	FW	FRA	Adrien Dabasse (end of loan to Les Herbiers)
26	DF	FRA	Brahim Konaté (from Auxerre)
30	GK	FRA	Enzo Pauchet (from Saint-Pryvé Saint-Hilaire)
—	MF	FRA	Messaoud Bouardja (end of loan to Wasquehal)

Out:

No.	Pos.	Nation	Player
1	GK	FRA	Alexandre Bouchard
3	DF	CIV	Zie Diabaté (end of loan from Nîmes)
5	MF	ALG	Laurent Agouazi (to Racing Luxembourg)
8	MF	CMR	Didier Lamkel Zé (to (Belgium) Antwerp)
11	MF	BRA	Pedro Henrique (on loan to (Belgium) Tubize)
15	MF	FRA	Alliou Dembélé (to Ajaccio)
17	DF	FRA	Antoine Batisse (to Pau)
19	MF	FRA	Jimmy Roye (to Gazélec Ajaccio)
21	DF	FRA	Jérémy Choplin (to Ajaccio)
25	MF	FRA	Banfa Diakité (to Bourg-Péronnas)
30	GK	FRA	Arthur Desmas (to Rodez)
40	GK	FRA	Alexandre Olliero (end of loan from Nantes)
—	MF	FRA	Quentin Daubin (to Pau, previously on loan)
—	FW	FRA	Kevin Rocheteau (to Cholet, previously on loan at Les Herbiers)

=== Orléans ===
In:

No.	Pos.	Nation	Player
4	DF	FRA	Gabriel Mutombo (from Angers, previously on loan)
11	FW	FRA	Jordan Tell (on loan from Rennes, previously on loan at Valenciennes)
18	DF	FRA	Quentin Lecoeuche (on loan from Lorient)
19	FW	FRA	Armand Laurienté (on loan from Rennes)
20	MF	CGO	Durel Avounou (on loan from Caen)
21	DF	FRA	Ruben Droehnle (on loan from Lille)
24	MF	FRA	Yohan Demoncy (from Paris Saint-Germain, previously on loan)
25	FW	FRA	Fahd El Khoumisti (from Paris Saint-Germain)
28	MF	SEN	Joseph Lopy (from Clermont)
—	MF	FRA	Thomas Ephestion (from Lens)

Out:

No.	Pos.	Nation	Player
14	FW	SEN	Yannick Gomis (to Lens)
17	MF	FRA	Matthieu Chemin (released)
19	MF	FRA	Ferris N'Goma (to Brest)
20	MF	FRA	Matthieu Ligoule (retired)
21	MF	TUN	Mohamed Ben Othman (to (Tunisia) Club Africain)
25	DF	FRA	Edson Seidou (to Red Star)
27	FW	FRA	Livio Nabab (to Bourg-Péronnas)
28	MF	FRA	Denis Will Poha (end of loan from Rennes)
—	FW	SEN	Oumar Camara (to (Greece) Panionios, previously on loan at Lyon-Duchère)

=== Paris ===
In:

No.	Pos.	Nation	Player
6	MF	MLI	Rominigue Kouamé (on loan from Lille)
7	MF	FRA	Garland Gbellé (from Cholet)
9	FW	GLP	Yannick Mamilonne (on loan from Amiens, previously on loan at Quevilly-Rouen)
10	MF	BRA	Dyjan (on loan from (Czech Republic) Baník Ostrava)
11	FW	FRA	Fabien Ourega (from Drancy)
19	DF	FRA	Ousmane Kanté (from Béziers)
22	DF	SUI	Vincent Rüfli (from Dijon)
25	MF	FRA	Keelan Lebon (end of loan to Chambly)
27	MF	BFA	Jonathan Pitroipa (from (Belgium) Antwerp)
29	FW	SEN	Adama Sarr (from Bourg-Péronnas)
—	DF	FRA	Romain Perraud (on loan from Nice)

Out:

No.	Pos.	Nation	Player
3	DF	FRA	Thomas Delaine (to Metz)
5	DF	GUI	Ousmane Sidibé (to Béziers)
6	MF	FRA	Martin Mimoun (to (Romania) Politehnica Iași)
8	MF	FRA	Redouane Kerrouche (to (Belgium) OH Leuven)
9	FW	GAB	Axel Meye (to (Kuwait) Qadsia SC)
10	MF	MAR	Saifeddine Alami (to (Morocco) Raja Casablanca)
11	MF	FRA	Mathieu Robail (to Croix)
18	FW	FRA	Malik Tchokounté (to Caen)
19	DF	CIV	Hervé Lybohy (to Nîmes)
20	MF	FRA	Baboye Traoré (to Dunkerque)
27	FW	FRA	Valentin Lavigne (end of loan from Lorient)
28	MF	ALG	Idriss Ech-Chergui (to Toulon)
—	FW	LIE	Guillaume Khous (to Drancy, previously on loan)

=== Red Star ===
In:

No.	Pos.	Nation	Player
9	FW	FRA	Moussa Sao (from Sochaux)
12	MF	FRA	Emmanuel Bourgaud (from Amiens)
14	MF	FRA	Grégory Berthier (on loan from Reims)
15	DF	FRA	Edson Seidou (from Orléans)
16	GK	FRA	Nicolas Douchez (from Lens)
23	FW	FRA	Jordan Faucher (from (Israel) Bnei Sakhnin)
27	FW	FRA	Julio Donisa (from Concarneau)
—	MF	FRA	Reda Kaddouri (from Bobigny)
—	MF	FRA	Sammy Vidal (from Drancy)

Out:

No.	Pos.	Nation	Player
7	MF	MLI	Tiécoro Keita (to Les Herbiers)
9	FW	FRA	Anthony Petrilli (to Les Herbiers)
11	FW	GUI	Sekou Keita (to (Cyprus) Ermis Aradippou)
27	FW	SEN	Abdoulaye Sané (to Sochaux)
30	GK	FRA	Alexis Sauvage (on loan to Villefranche)

=== Sochaux ===
In:

No.	Pos.	Nation	Player
2	DF	ESP	Rafael Páez (on loan from (Spain) Alavés, previously on loan at (Croatia) Rudeš)
4	DF	ESP	Josema (on loan from (Spain) Córdoba)
5	DF	BEN	Olivier Verdon (from Bordeaux)
7	MF	ESP	Madger Gomes (from (England) Leeds)
8	DF	ESP	Einar Galilea (on loan from (Spain) Alavés, previously on loan at (Croatia) Rudeš)
10	FW	ANG	Anderson Emanuel (on loan from (Spain) Alavés, previously on loan at (Croatia) Rudeš)
12	FW	ENG	Tope Obadeyi (from (England) Oldham)
14	FW	BIH	Ermedin Demirović (on loan from (Spain) Alavés)
17	MF	FRA	Elisha Owusu (on loan from Lyon)
20	DF	AUT	Markus Pavic (on loan from (Croatia) Rudeš)
21	MF	ESP	Nando (on loan from (Spain) Alavés, previously on loan at (Spain) Lorca)
24	DF	ESP	Rafa Navarro (on loan from (Spain) Alavés)
27	FW	SEN	Abdoulaye Sané (from Red Star)
28	FW	UKR	Pylyp Budkivskyi (on loan from (Ukraine) Shakhtar Donetsk, previously on loan at (Russia) Anzhi Makhachkala)

Out:

No.	Pos.	Nation	Player
2	DF	FRA	Mickaël Alphonse (to Dijon)
4	DF	CMR	Adolphe Teikeu (to (Saudi Arabia) Ohod Club)
5	DF	MAR	Zakarya Bergdich (to (Portugal) Belenenses)
7	MF	FRA	Florin Berenguer (to (Australia) Melbourne City)
8	MF	TUR	Aksel Aktas (to Reims)
10	FW	FRA	Moussa Sao (to Red Star)
11	MF	FRA	Florian Martin
12	DF	FRA	Florent Ogier (to Clermont)
13	DF	GER	Mart Ristl (to (Germany) VfR Aalen)
14	FW	TUN	Yoann Touzghar (to Troyes)
15	FW	FRA	Aldo Kalulu (end of loan from Lyon)
20	MF	FRA	Axel Bakayoko (end of loan from (Italy) Inter Milan)
21	FW	CIV	Yakou Meïté (end of loan from (England) Reading)
22	DF	FRA	Florian Tardieu (to (Belgium) Zulte-Waregem)
24	MF	FRA	El Hadji Ba (to Lens)
29	MF	GER	Patrick Kapp
—	DF	FRA	Nicolas Senzemba (on loan to (Croatia) Istra, previously on loan at Pau)
—	FW	FRA	Bryan Lasme (on loan to Cholet)

=== Troyes ===
In:

No.	Pos.	Nation	Player
1	GK	FRA	Alexandre Letellier (on loan from Angers, previously on loan at (Switzerland) Young Boys)
5	DF	CGO	Randi Goteni (end of loan to Béziers)
6	MF	ALG	Ahmed Kashi (from (England) Charlton)
14	FW	TUN	Yoann Touzghar (from Sochaux)
15	MF	MAD	Rayan Raveloson (from Tours)
21	DF	GUF	Yoann Salmier (on loan from Strasbourg)
22	DF	FRA	Mory Koné (end of loan to Tours)
28	MF	FRA	Jason Berthomier (from Brest)
31	MF	FRA	Vincent Marcel (on loan from Nice)
—	DF	POR	Yohan Tavares (from (Cyprus) APOEL Nicosia)
—	MF	POR	Claude Gonçalves (from (Portugal) Tondela)
—	MF	LUX	Christopher Martins Pereira (on loan from Lyon, previously on loan at Bourg-Péronnas)
—	FW	FRA	Kévin Fortuné (from Lens)

Out:

No.	Pos.	Nation	Player
1	GK	FRA	Erwin Zelazny (to Caen)
6	MF	FRA	Karim Azamoum (to (Spain) Cádiz)
7	MF	FRA	Rémi Walter (end of loan from Nice)
9	FW	KOR	Hyun-Jun Suk (to Reims)
11	FW	FRA	Raphaël Cacérès (released)
13	MF	TUN	Saîf-Eddine Khaoui (end of loan from Marseille)
14	MF	FRA	François Bellugou (to Auxerre)
19	MF	FRA	Tristan Dingome (to Reims)
22	DF	FRA	Christophe Hérelle (to Nice)
23	DF	MLI	Charles Traoré (to Nantes)
29	FW	FRA	Samuel Grandsir (to Monaco)

=== Valenciennes ===
In:

No.	Pos.	Nation	Player
1	GK	CIV	Hillel Konaté (from Boulogne)
4	DF	FRA	Sikou Niakaté (on loan from Guingamp)
14	DF	FRA	Joffrey Cuffaut (from Nancy)
17	FW	FRA	Jorris Romil (end of loan to Les Herbiers)
21	MF	FRA	Eden Massouema (on loan from Dijon)
25	DF	GHA	Emmanuel Ntim (end of loan to Chambly)
30	GK	FRA	Thomas Vincensini (from Bastia-Borgo)
—	MF	FRA	Mahamé Siby (from Bobigny)

Out:

No.	Pos.	Nation	Player
3	MF	CTA	Eloge Enza Yamissi (released)
4	DF	FRA	Sikou Niakaté (to Guingamp)
11	MF	MLI	Sigamary Diarra (released)
12	FW	FRA	Jordan Tell (end of loan from Rennes)
17	DF	FRA	Loris Néry (to Nancy)
18	MF	CIV	Lossémy Karaboué (released)
21	DF	SEN	Saliou Ciss (end of loan from Angers)
23	FW	FRA	Lenny Nangis (to (Greece) Levadiakos)
25	DF	ALG	Mehdi Tahrat (loan return to Angers)
30	GK	FRA	Cyrille Merville (released)
—	GK	FRA	Nicolas Kocik (on loan to Le Mans)
—	FW	FRA	Gwenn Foulon (to Bastia-Borgo, previously on loan at Croix)

== See also ==
- 2018–19 Ligue 1
- 2018–19 Ligue 2
