= 2018–19 Nîmes Olympique season =

Nîmes Olympique
2018–19 season
- President: Rani Assaf
- Head coach: Bernard Blaquart
- Stadium: Stade des Costières, Nîmes
- Ligue 1: 9th
- Coupe de France: Round of 64
- Coupe de la Ligue: Round of 16
- Top goalscorer: League: Denis Bouanga; Renaud Ripart (8 each); All: Denis Bouanga (9)
- Highest home attendance: League/All: 18,045 (3 February 2019 v. Montpellier)
- Lowest home attendance: League: 12,015 (23 January 2019 v.Angers); All: 6,260 (27 November 2018 v. Saint-Étienne, CdlL R3)
- Average home league attendance: 13,898
- Biggest win: 4–0 (3 November 2018 at Dijon)
- Biggest defeat: 0–5 (28 April 2019 at Lille)
Home colours	Away colours	Third colours

The 2018–19 Nîmes Olympique season was the first season since 1992-93 for Nîmes Olympique in Ligue 1, the top tier of professional football league in the French football league system.

== Current squad ==
As of 3 January 2019.

Note: Flags indicate national team as defined under FIFA eligibility rules; some limited exceptions apply. Players may hold more than one non-FIFA nationality.

No.	Pos.	Nation	Player
1	GK	FRA	Baptiste Valette
2	MF	SEN	Mustapha Diallo
5	DF	FRA	Loïck Landre
6	MF	FRA	Jordan Ferri (on loan from Lyon)
7	FW	MAR	Rachid Alioui
8	MF	FRA	Pierrick Valdivia
9	FW	FRA	Clément Depres
10	MF	GAB	Denis Bouanga
11	MF	FRA	Téji Savanier
12	MF	FRA	Faitout Maouassa (on loan from Rennes)
14	MF	FRA	Antonin Bobichon
15	DF	FRA	Gaëtan Paquiez
16	GK	FRA	Martin Sourzac
17	FW	GRE	Panagiotis Vlachodimos

No.	Pos.	Nation	Player
18	MF	FRA	Theo Valls
19	FW	TUR	Umut Bozok
20	FW	FRA	Renaud Ripart (3rd captain)
21	DF	ALG	Féthi Harek (captain)
22	FW	FRA	Sada Thioub
23	DF	FRA	Anthony Briançon (vice-captain)
24	FW	MAR	Sami Ben Amar
25	FW	BEL	Baptiste Guillaume (on loan from Angers)
26	DF	FRA	Florian Miguel
27	DF	CIV	Hervé Lybohy
28	MF	MAR	Abdel Malik Hsissane
29	DF	FRA	Sofiane Alakouch
30	GK	FRA	Paul Bernardoni (on loan from Bordeaux)

== Competitions ==
Win Draw Loss

=== Ligue 1 ===
==== League table ====
Pos	Team	Pld	W	D	L	GF	GA	GD	Pts	Qualification or relegation
7	Nice	38	15	11	12	30	35	−5	56	
8	Reims	38	13	16	9	39	42	−3	55	
9	Nîmes	38	15	8	15	57	58	−1	53	
10	Rennes	38	13	13	12	55	52	+3	52	Qualification to Europa League group stage (Note: Rennes qualified for the Europa League group stage by winning the 2018–19 Coupe de France.)
11	Strasbourg	38	11	16	11	58	48	+10	49	Qualification to Europa League second qualifying round (Note: Strasbourg qualified for the Europa League second qualifying round by winning the 2018–19 Coupe de la Ligue.)

Source: Ligue 1 and Soccerway
Rules for classification: 1) Points; 2) Goal difference; 3) Head-to-head points; 4) Head-to-head goal difference; 5) Head-to-head goals scored; 6) Head-to-head away goals scored; 7) Goals scored; 8) Away goals scored; 9) Most goals scored in single league match; 10) Fairplay ranking.

==== Results summary ====
Overall								Home						Away					
Pld	W	D	L	GF	GA	GD	Pts	W	D	L	GF	GA	GD	W	D	L	GF	GA	GD
38	15	8	15	57	58	−1	53	9	5	5	30	20	+10	6	3	10	27	38	−11

Source: Ligue 1

==== Results by round ====
Round	1	2	3	4	5	6	7	8	9	10	11	12	13	14	15	16	17	18	19	20	21	22	23	24	25	26	27	28	29	30	31	32	33	34	35	36	37	38
Ground	A	H	A	H	A	A	H	A	H	A	H	A	H	A	H	A	H	H	A	H	H	A	H	A	H	A	H	A	H	A	H	A	H	A	A	H	A	H
Result	W	W	L	L	D	D	D	L	D	L	D	W	L	W	W	W	W	L	L	W	L	L	D	W	W	L	W	L	D	L	W	L	W	L	W	W	D	L
Position	7	2	5	10	8	10	12	14	14	15	16	13	14	11	10	8	6	8	10	10	10	11	11	11	10	11	11	12	12	12	10	10	9	9	8	8	7	9

A = Away; H = Home; W = Win; D = Draw; L = Loss

==== Matches ====
11 August 2018 1	Angers	3–4	Nîmes	Angers
20:00 CEST (UTC+2)	Capelle 33'; Manceau (yellow card) 42'; Fulgini 51'; Traoré 55'; Bamba (yellow card) 70'	Report	Thioub 4'; Miguel (yellow card) 74' (yellow-red card) 79'; Depres 76'; Ripart 85'; Thomas 88' (o.g.)	Stadium: Stade Raymond Kopa; Attendance: 9,534; Referee: Antony Gautier

19 August 2018 2	Nîmes	3–1	Marseille	Nîmes
21:00 CEST (UTC+02:00)	Bouanga 34', (yellow card) 36'; Thioub 62'; Landre (yellow card) 68'; Diallo (yellow card) 74'; Ripart 87'	Report	Thauvin 49'; Sanson (yellow card) 72'	Stadium: Stade des Costières; Attendance: 15,285; Referee: Benoît Bastien

25 August 2018 3	Toulouse	1–0	Nîmes	Toulouse
20:00 CEST (UTC+2)	Gradel 80' (pen.); Durmaz (yellow card) 90+4'	Report	Landre (yellow card) 38'; Guillaume (yellow card) 65'; Bozok (yellow card) 89'	Stadium: Stadium Municipal; Attendance: 11,746; Referee: Frank Schneider

1 September 2018 4	Nîmes	2–4	Paris Saint-Germain	Nîmes
17:00 CEST (UTC+2)	Diallo (yellow card) 3'; Bobichon 63'; Savanier 71' (pen.), (red card) 90+3'	Report	Neymar 36', (yellow card) 51'; Di María 40'; Mbappé (yellow card) 18' (red card) 90+3', (goal) 77'; Meunier (yellow card) 58'; Cavani 90+2'	Stadium: Stade des Costières; Attendance: 15,311; Referee: Jérôme Brisard

16 September 2018 5	Bordeaux	3–3	Nîmes	Bordeaux
17:00 CEST (UTC+2)	Briand 26', 56'; Palencia (yellow card) 49'; Kalu 57'; Plašil (yellow card) 80'	Report	Guillaume 32'; Bobichon 45'; Bozok 78'	Stadium: Matmut Atlantique; Attendance: 15,895; Referee: Antony Gautier

21 September 2018 6	AS Monaco	1–1	Nîmes	Monaco
20:45 CEST (UTC+02:00)	Falcao 27'; N'Doram (yellow card) 90+4'	Report	Guillaume (yellow card) 4'; Briançon 19'; Diallo (yellow card) 75'	Stadium: Stade Louis II; Attendance: 6,837; Referee: Amaury Delerue

26 September 2018 7	Nîmes	0–0	Guingamp	Guingamp
19:00 CEST (UTC+2)	Landre (yellow card) 67'; Paquiez (yellow card) 81'; Diallo (yellow card) 87'	Report	Eboa Eboa (yellow card) 32'; Thuram (yellow card) 45+2'; Kerbrat (yellow card) 58'	Stadium: Stade de Roudourou; Attendance: 14,772; Referee: Benoît Millot

30 September 2018 8	Montpellier	3–0	Nîmes	Montpellier
17:00	Aguilar (yellow card) 3'; Oyongo 28', (yellow card) 62'; Delort 45+6' (pen.); Laborde 78'	Report	Lybohy (yellow card) 42'; Diallo (yellow card) 45+2'; Briançon (yellow card) 45+6'	Stadium: Stade de la Mosson; Attendance: 20,054; Referee: Ruddy Buquet

6 October 2018 9	Nîmes	0–0	Reims	Nîmes
20:00 CEST (UTC+2)	Guillaume (yellow card) 60'	Report	Ndom (yellow card) 90+3'	Stadium: Stade des Costières; Attendance: 12,958; Referee: Karim Abed

19 October 2018 10	Lyon	2–0	Nîmes	Décines-Charpieu
20:45 CEST (UTC+02:00)	Dembélé 24'; Diop (yellow card) 34'; Depay 90'	Report	Harek (yellow card) 17'; Briançon (yellow card) 32'	Stadium: Parc Olympique Lyonnais; Attendance: 42,896; Referee: Olivier Thual

26 October 2018 11	Nîmes	1–1	Saint-Étienne	Nîmes
20:45 CEST (UTC+2)	Alioui 74'; Bouanga (yellow card) 90+2'	Report	Cabella 1', (yellow card) 83'; M'Vila (yellow card) 66'; Khazri (yellow card) 90+5'	Stadium: Stade des Costières; Attendance: 15,412; Referee: François Letexier

3 November 2018 12	Dijon	0–4	Nîmes	Dijon
20:00 CET (UTC+1)	Ciman (yellow card) 28'	Report	Bouanga 5', 65'; Savanier 30'; Briançon 86'	Stadium: Stade Gaston Gérard; Attendance: 12,113; Referee: Frank Schneider

10 November 2018 13	Nîmes	0–1	Nice	Nîmes
20:00 CET (UTC+1)	Maouassa (yellow card) 14' (yellow-red card) 20'; Landre (red card) 45+2'; Valls (yellow card) 90+2'; Savanier (yellow card) 90+4'	Report	Barbosa (yellow card) 17'; Balotelli (yellow card) 29'; Hérelle (yellow card) 57'; Attal 61'; Jallet (yellow card) 65'; Maolida (yellow card) 73'	Stadium: Stade des Costières; Attendance: 14,290; Referee: Benoît Bastien

24 November 2018 14	Strasbourg	0–1	Nîmes	Strasbourg
20:00 CET (UTC+1)	Aaneba (yellow card) 53'; Martin (yellow card) 77'; Mitrović (red card) 80'; Liénard (yellow card) 82'	Report	Lybohy 70'; Ferri (yellow card) 82'	Stadium: Stade de la Meinau; Attendance: 25,128; Referee: Benoît Millot

1 December 2018 15	Nîmes	3–0	Amiens	Nîmes
20:00 CET (UTC+01:00)	Bouanga 45'; Alioui 76', 87'; Ripart (yellow card) 81'	Report	Mendoza (yellow card) 6'; Dibassy (yellow card) 22'; Adénon (yellow card) 62'; Ghoddos (yellow card) 84'	Stadium: Stade des Costières; Attendance: 12,159; Referee: Karim Abed

5 December 2018 16	Caen	1–2	Nîmes	Caen
19:00 CET (UTC+1)	Djiku (yellow card) 59'; Oniangué 90'	Report	Bozok 18'; Alakouch (yellow card) 70'; Savanier (yellow card) 89'; Paquiez (yellow card) 90+1'; Landre 90+5'	Stadium: Stade Michel d'Ornano; Attendance: 14,501; Referee: Florent Batta

8 December 2018 17	Nîmes	Postponed	Nantes	Nîmes
19:00 CET (UTC+1)				Stadium: Stade des Costières

16 December 2018 18	Nîmes	2–3	Lille	Nîmes
15:00 CET (UTC+1)	Savanier (yellow card) 57'; Alioui 68'; Bouanga (yellow card) 74'; Ferri (yellow card) 79'; Depres 90+2'	Report	Leão 4'; Bamba (yellow card) 12', (goal) 41'; J. Fonte (red card) 16'; Ié (yellow card) 38'; Mendes (yellow card) 56'; Pépé 66'	Stadium: Stade des Costières; Attendance: 13,428; Referee: Hakim Ben El Hadj

22 December 2018 19	Rennes	4–0	Nîmes	Rennes
21:00 CET (UTC+1)	André 6'; Bourigeaud 14'; Siebatcheu 47', 67'; Traoré (yellow card) 80'	Report	Briançon (yellow card) 34'; Paquiez (yellow card) 88'	Stadium: Roazhon Park; Attendance: 22,430; Referee: Jeremy Stinat

12 January 2019 20	Nîmes	Postponed	Angers	Nîmes
20:00 CET (UTC+1)				Stadium: Stade des Costières

16 January 2019 17	Nîmes	1–0	Nantes	Nîmes
19:00 CET (UTC+1)	Alakouch 64'; Depres (yellow card) 86'	Report	Coulibaly (yellow card) 2' (red card) 45+2'; Pallois (yellow card) 77'; Diego (yellow card) 90+3'	Stadium: Stade des Costières; Attendance: 12,806; Referee: Hakim Ben El Hadj
Note: The match, originally scheduled for 8 December 2018, was postponed due to security concerns as a result of the yellow vests movement.

19 January 2019 21	Nîmes	0–1	Toulouse	Nîmes
20:00 CET (UTC+1)	Briançon (yellow card) 50'; Savanier (yellow card) 75'; Thioub (yellow card) 81'	Report	Sidibé (yellow card) 32'; Sanogo 41'	Stadium: Stade des Costières; Attendance: 12,736; Referee: Jérôme Brisard

23 January 2019 20	Nîmes	3–1	Angers	Nîmes
19:00 CET (UTC+1)	Depres 31', 49'; Landre 34'; Briançon (yellow card) 90+1'	Report	Bamba (yellow card) 42'; Tait (yellow card) 58'; Bahoken 90+2' (pen.)	Stadium: Stade des Costières; Attendance: 12,015; Referee: Olivier Thual

26 January 2019 22	Nice	2–0	Nîmes	Nice
20:00 CET (UTC+1)	Ganago (yellow card) 31'; Atal 41'; Saint-Maximin 54'	Report	Landre (yellow card) 53'; Alakouch (yellow card) 88'; Thioub (yellow card) 90+1'	Stadium: Allianz Riviera; Attendance: 15,982; Referee: Benoît Millot

3 February 2019 23	Nîmes	1–1	Montpellier	Nîmes
15:00 CET (UTC+1)	Landre 2'; Alioui (yellow card) 68'; Briançon (yellow card) 77'	Report	Mollet (yellow card) 45'; Delort 73'	Stadium: Stade des Costières; Attendance: 18,045; Referee: Antony Gautier

10 February 2019 24	Nantes	2–4	Nîmes	Nantes
15:00 CET (UTC+1)	Coulibaly 15'; Girotto (yellow card) 31'; Waris 38' (pen.)	Report	Guillaume (yellow card) 9', (goal) 48'; Lybohy (yellow card) 36'; Bobichon 69'; Ferri 85'; Thioub 89'	Stadium: Stade de la Beaujoire; Attendance: 34,219; Referee: Clément Turpin

15 February 2019 25	Nîmes	2–0	Dijon	Nîmes
19:00 CET (UTC+1)	Savanier 28'; Ferri (yellow card) 35'; Landre (yellow card) 58'; Bobichon 83'	Report	Chafik (yellow card) 13'; Abeid (yellow card) 35'; Lautoa (yellow card) 54'; Haddadi (yellow card) 66' (yellow-red card) 89'	Stadium: Stade des Costières; Attendance: 12,703; Referee: Jérôme Miguelgorry

23 February 2019 26	Paris Saint-Germain	3–0	Nîmes	Paris
17:00 CET (UTC+1)	Paredes (yellow card) 16'; Nkunku 40'; Mbappé (yellow card) 45+1', (goal) 69', 90'; Bernat (yellow card) 72'	Report		Stadium: Parc des Princes; Attendance: 47,377; Referee: Amaury Delerue

2 March 2019 27	Nîmes	Postponed	Rennes	Nîmes
TBD CET (UTC+1)				Stadium: Stade des Costières
Note: Match postponed to allow Rennes to prepare for Europa League match versus Arsenal.

9 March 2019 28	Amiens	2–1	Nîmes	Amiens
20:00 CET (UTC+1)	Guirassy 49', (red card) 89'; Konaté (yellow card) 55'; Pieters 64'; Lefort (yellow card) 71'	Report	Alioui 53'; Landre (yellow card) 76'	Stadium: Stade de la Licorne; Attendance: 10,523; Referee: Willy Delajod

16 March 2019 29	Nîmes	2–2	Strasbourg	Nîmes
20:00 CET (UTC+1)	Bouanga (yellow card) 55'; Valls (yellow card) 59'; Lybohy 67'; Ripart (yellow card) 68'; Savanier (yellow card) 85', (goal) 90+2' (pen.)	Report	Mothiba 9', (yellow card) 87'; Da Costa (yellow card) 14'; Carole (yellow card) 46'; Prcić (yellow card) 49'; Fofana 53'; Koné (yellow card) 90'; Lala (yellow card) 90'	Stadium: Stade des Costières; Attendance: 13,114; Referee: Amaury Delerue

1 April 2019 30	Saint-Étienne	2–1	Nîmes	Saint-Étienne
20:30 CEST (UTC+2)	Debuchy (yellow card) 6'; Cabella 24'; Berić 79'; Ghezali (yellow card) 85'; M'Vila (yellow card) 90+1'	Report	Bobichon 2', (yellow card) 90+1'; Ferri (yellow card) 24'; Paquiez (yellow card) 56'; Briançon (yellow card) 82'	Stadium: Stade Geoffroy-Guichard; Attendance: 22,595; Referee: Karim Abed

6 April 2019 31	Nîmes	2–0	Caen	Nîmes
20:00 CEST (UTC+2)	Briançon (yellow card) 42'; Bouanga 85'; Gradit 90+4' (o.g.)	Report	Zahary (yellow card) 11'; Fajr (yellow card) 19'; Deminguet (yellow card) 42'; Djiku (yellow card) 90'	Stadium: Stade des Costières; Attendance: 12,183; Referee: Olivier Thual

9 April 2019 27	Nîmes	3–1	Rennes	Nîmes
19:00 CEST (UTC+2)	Ripart 24'; Lybohy (yellow card) 31'; Ferri (yellow card) 37'; Briançon (red card) 45+2'; Bouanga 55'; Bobichon 72'	Report	André (yellow card) 23' (yellow-red card) 45+5'; Lybohy 40' (o.g.)	Stadium: Stade des Costières; Attendance: 13,142; Referee: Clément Turpin
Note: Rescheduled from 2 March 2019.

13 April 2019 32	Marseille	2–1	Nîmes	Marseille
17:00 CEST (UTC+2)	Ćaleta-Car (yellow card) 24'; Germain 72'; Luiz Gustavo 73'	Report	Savanier (yellow card) 18', (goal) 82' (pen.); Maouassa (yellow card) 70'	Stadium: Stade Vélodrome; Attendance: 62,614; Referee: Frank Schneider

20 April 2019 33	Nîmes	2–1	Bordeaux	Nîmes
20:00 CEST (UTC+2)	Savanier 16' (pen.); Ripart 63'	Report	Maja 13'; Koundé (yellow card) 16'; Jovanović (yellow card) 28'; Kamano (yellow card) 41'; De Préville (yellow card) 83'	Stadium: Stade des Costières; Attendance: 13,910; Referee: Florent Batta

28 April 2019 34	Lille	5–0	Nîmes	Villeneuve-d'Ascq
15:00 CEST (UTC+2)	Rémy (yellow card) 25', (goal) 51'; Bamba 64'; Çelik 70'; Pépé 80'; R. Fonte 90+3'	Report	Miguel (yellow card) 32'; Bobichon (yellow card) 49'	Stadium: Stade Pierre-Mauroy; Attendance: 36,356; Referee: Amaury Delerue

4 May 2019 35	Reims	0–3	Nîmes	Reims
20:00 CEST (UTC+2)	Dingomé (yellow card) 22'; Oudin (yellow card) 45+2'; Engels (yellow card) 45+2'	Report	Ferri 26'; Alakouch (yellow card) 28'; Ripart 43'; Bouanga 46'; Thioub (yellow card) 56'; Savanier (yellow card) 78'	Stadium: Stade Auguste Delaune; Attendance: 13,314; Referee: Thomas Leonard

11 May 2019 36	Nîmes	1–0	AS Monaco	Nîmes
20:00 CEST (UTC+2)	Ripart 9'; Bouanga (yellow card) 45'	Report	Silva (yellow card) 16'; Golovin (yellow card) 41'; Ballo-Touré (yellow card) 64'; Jemerson (yellow card) 90+3'	Stadium: Stade des Costières; Attendance: 14,811; Referee: Jérémy Stinat

18 May 2019 37	Guingamp	2–2	Nîmes	Guingamp
21:00 CEST (UTC+2)	Thuram 6', (yellow card) 44'; Ikoko (yellow card) 33'; Mendy 35'	Report	Alakouch (yellow card) 48'; Ripart 53'; Bouanga 56'; Briançon (yellow card) 66'	Stadium: Stade de Roudourou; Attendance: 12,096; Referee: Jérôme Miguelgorry

24 May 2019 38	Nîmes	2–3	Lyon	Nîmes
21:05 CEST (UTC+2)	Ripart 11'; Bobichon 45+3'; Paquiez (yellow card) 61'	Report	Cornet 6', 89'; Ndombele 90+1'; Traoré (yellow card) 90+5'	Stadium: Stade des Costières; Attendance: 14,986; Referee: François Letexier

=== Coupe de France ===
5 January 2019 Round of 64	AS Lyon-Duchère	3–0	Nîmes	Lyon
15:00 CET (UTC+1)	Mendes 13'; Banor (yellow card) 24'; Julienne 80'; Ezikian 88'	Report	Maouassa (yellow card) 37'; Alakouch (yellow card) 67'	Stadium: Stade de Balmont; Attendance: 1,500; Referee: Clément Turpin

=== Coupe de la Ligue ===
27 November 2018 Third round	Nîmes	1–1 (4–2 p)	Saint-Étienne	Nîmes
19:00 CET (UTC+1)	Hsissane (yellow card) 23'; Bouanga 90'	Report	Dioussé (yellow card) 5'; Khazri (yellow card) 72'; Berić 81'	Stadium: Stade des Costières; Attendance: 6,260; Referee: Mikaël Lesage
	Penalties
	Savanier (penalty scored); Bobichon (penalty missed); Bouanga (penalty scored); Alioui (penalty scored); Bozok (penalty scored)		(penalty missed) Khazri; (penalty missed) M'Vila; (penalty scored) Salibur; (penalty scored) Polomat

19 December 2018 Round of 16	Le Havre	2–1	Nîmes	Le Havre
21:05 CET (UTC+1)	Gory (yellow card) 5'; Kadewere 33'; Mayembo (yellow card) 36'; Bonnet (yellow card) 50' (goal) 58'; Lekhal (yellow card) 72'	Report	Depres (yellow card) 11'; Bobichon 38'; Maouassa (yellow card) 54'; Bozok (yellow card) 61'; Savanier (yellow card) 90'	Stadium: Stade Océane; Attendance: 6,150; Referee: François Letexier
