= Alexandre Oukidja =

Footballer (born 1988)

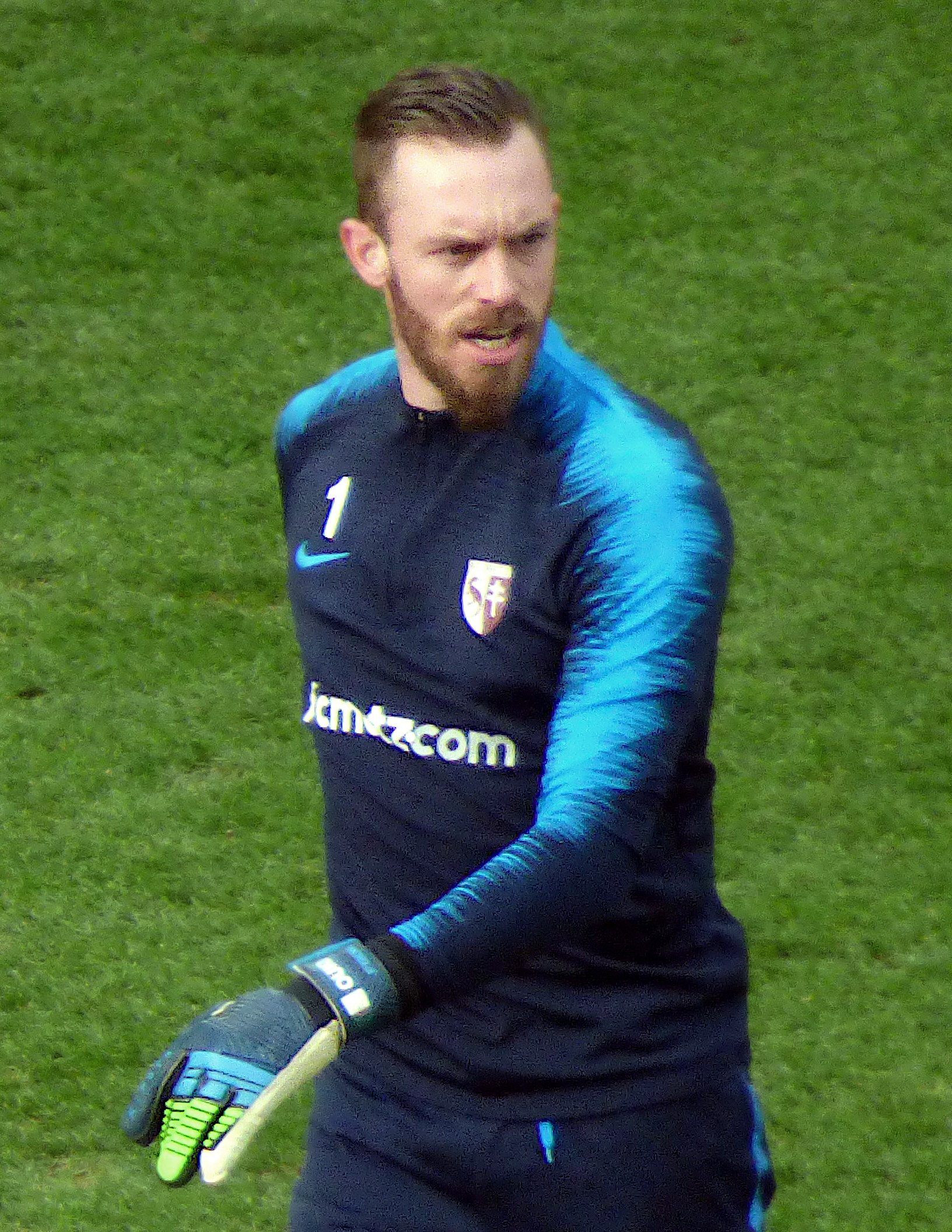

Personal information
- Full name: Alexandre Roger Marcel Oukidja
- Date of birth: 19 July 1988 (age 38)
- Place of birth: Nevers, France
- Height: 1.84 m (6 ft 0 in)
- Position: Goalkeeper

Team information
- Current team: ES Sétif
- Number: 1

Senior career*
Years	Team	Apps	(Gls)
2005–2006	Gueugnon	1	(0)
2006–2014	Lille B	84	(0)
2007–2014	Lille	0	(0)
2012	→ Aviron Bayonnais (loan)	13	(0)
2012–2014	→ Mouscron (loan)	64	(0)
2014–2018	Strasbourg	109	(0)
2018–2025	Metz	204	(0)
2025	IMT	1	(0)
2026–	ES Sétif	1	(0)

International career^{‡}
2019–2025	Algeria	7	(0)
Medal record
Men's football
Representing Algeria
Africa Cup of Nations
Winner	2019 Egypt
- * Club domestic league appearances and goals as of 11 September 2026 ‡ National team caps and goals as of 28 August 2025

Alexandre Roger Marcel Oukidja (Arabic: الكسندر روجر أوكيجا; born 19 July 1988) is a professional footballer who plays as a goalkeeper for ES Sétif. Born in France, he plays for the Algeria national team.

== Club career ==
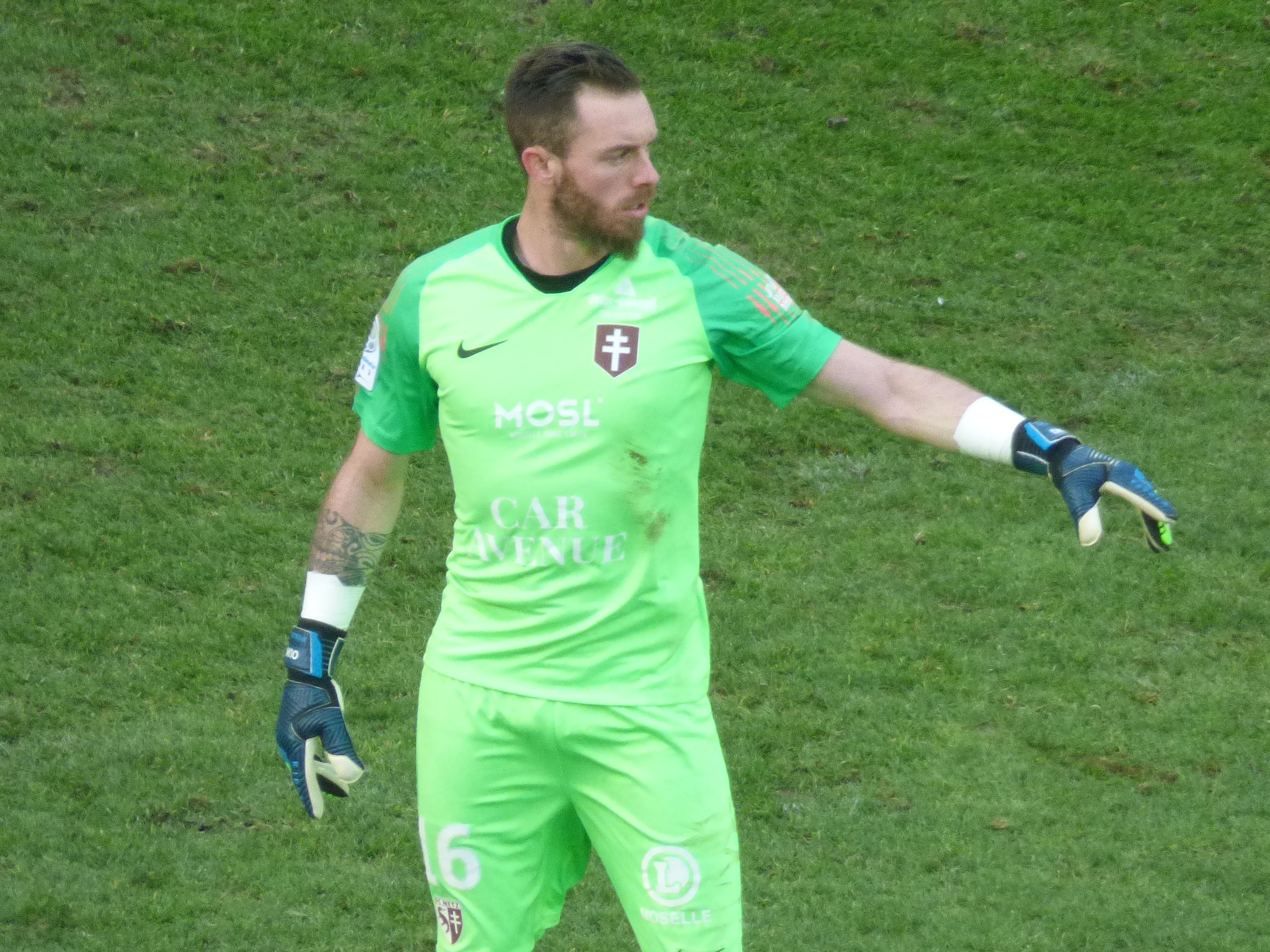
Oukidja with Metz in 2019

Oukidja made his professional debut in the 2005–06 season in Ligue 2 for Gueugnon, coming on as a half-time substitute for Pierre Bouysse in a 1–3 defeat away at Montpellier. He joined Lille in the summer of 2006 and over the following seasons, he established himself as the first-choice goalkeeper for the reserve team in the Championnat de France Amateur. On 27 January 2012, Oukidja joined Championnat National side Aviron Bayonnais on a six-month loan deal.

On 26 July 2026, he joined Algerian club ES Sétif.

== International career ==
Oukidja made his debut for the Algeria national team on 26 March 2019 in a 1–0 friendly win against Tunisia. He was also member of the Algerian squad which won the 2019 Africa Cup of Nations.

On 15 June 2023, Oukidja officially announced his international retirement after playing only six matches with the national team. In August 2024, he came out of the retirement and was included in the squad for the 2025 Africa Cup of Nations qualification matches.

== Personal life ==
Oukidja was born in France to an Algerian father from Tizi Ouzou and a French mother. He holds both French and Algerian nationalities.

== Career statistics ==
=== Club ===
As of 14 December 2024

Appearances and goals by club, season, and competition
Club	Season	League			National cup		League cup		Other		Total	
Club	Season	Division	Apps	Goals	Apps	Goals	Apps	Goals	Apps	Goals	Apps	Goals
Gueugnon	2005–06	Ligue 2	1	0	0	0	—		—		1	0
Lille B	2006–07	Championnat de France Amateur	13	0	—		—		—		13	0
Lille B	2007–08	Championnat de France Amateur	14	0	—		—		—		14	0
Lille B	2008–09	Championnat de France Amateur	15	0	—		—		—		15	0
Lille B	2009–10	Championnat de France Amateur	17	0	—		—		—		17	0
Lille B	2010–11	Championnat de France Amateur	23	0	—		—		—		23	0
Lille B	2011–12	Championnat de France Amateur	2	0	—		—		—		2	0
Lille B	Total		84	0	—		—		—		84	0
Aviron Bayonnais (loan)	2011–12	Championnat National	13	0	0	0	—		—		13	0
Mouscron (loan)	2012–13	Belgian Second Division	31	0	0	0	—		6 (Note: Appearances in the Belgian Second Division play-offs)	0	37	0
Mouscron (loan)	2013–14	Belgian Second Division	33	0	1	0	—		6	0	40	0
Mouscron (loan)	Total		64	0	1	0	—		12	0	77	0
Strasbourg	2014–15	Championnat National	22	0	2	0	—		—		24	0
Strasbourg	2015–16	Championnat National	34	0	0	0	—		—		34	0
Strasbourg	2016–17	Ligue 2	36	0	0	0	0	0	—		36	0
Strasbourg	2017–18	Ligue 1	17	0	2	0	2	0	—		21	0
Strasbourg	Total		109	0	4	0	2	0	—		115	0
Metz	2018–19	Ligue 2	38	0	0	0	0	0	—		38	0
Metz	2019–20	Ligue 1	27	0	0	0	0	0	—		27	0
Metz	2020–21	Ligue 1	34	0	1	0	—		—		35	0
Metz	2021–22	Ligue 1	21	0	0	0	—		—		21	0
Metz	2022–23	Ligue 2	34	0	3	0	—		—		37	0
Metz	2023–24	Ligue 1	34	0	1	0	—		2 (Note: Appearances in the Ligue 1 relegation/promotion play-offs)	0	37	0
Metz	2024–25	Ligue 2	16	0	0	0	—		0	0	16	0
Metz	Total		204	0	5	0	0	0	2	0	211	0
Career total			475	0	10	0	2	0	14	0	501	0

=== International ===
As of 14 November 2024

National team	Year	Apps	Goals
Algeria	2019	2	0
Algeria	2020	1	0
Algeria	2021	3	0
Algeria	2024	1	0
Total		7	0

== Honours ==
Algeria

- Africa Cup of Nations: 2019
