= Abdel Malik Hsissane =

Association football player (born 1991)

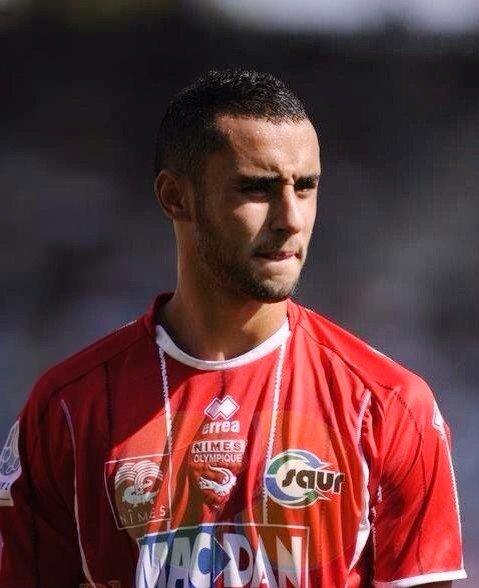
- Hsissane with Nîmes in 2012

Personal information
- Date of birth: 28 January 1991 (age 35)
- Place of birth: Nîmes, France
- Height: 1.86 m (6 ft 1 in)
- Position: Midfielder

Team information
- Current team: Stade Beaucairois

Youth career
- 2002–2005: Nîmes
- 2005–2006: Alès
- 2006–2010: Nîmes

Senior career*
Years	Team	Apps	(Gls)
2010–2015	Nîmes	61	(3)
2012–2015	Nîmes B	19	(2)
2016–2017	Lyon-Duchère	21	(0)
2017–2019	Nîmes B	31	(2)
2017–2019	Nîmes	3	(0)
2019–2020	Le Puy	12	(0)
2019–2020	Le Puy B	3	(0)
2020–2021	Sète	23	(4)
2021–2023	Toulon	25	(1)
2023–	Stade Beaucairois	24	(4)

International career
2011	Morocco U21	2	(0)
- * Club domestic league appearances and goals as of 7 December 2024

Abdel Malik Hsissane (born 28 January 1991) is a professional footballer who plays as a midfielder for Championnat National 3 club Stade Beaucairois. Born in France, he is a former Morocco youth international.

== Club career ==
Hsissane joined Nîmes at the age of ten, and trained throughout the youth ranks, apart from a single season with Alès when he was 13. He got to make his senior debut in Ligue 2 on 10 May 2011 against Vannes OC in a 3–1 defeat. In June 2011 he signed his first professional contract with the club.

After three seasons with the first team in Ligue 2, a total of 61 appearances, Hsissane was released by Nîmes in the summer of 2015. He spent an unsuccessfully year in Morocco, before returning to France with Championnat National side Lyon-Duchère in the summer of 2016.

Released by Lyon-Duchère at the end of the season, Hsissane found himself without a club. He approached Nîmes for the opportunity to train with the reserves in October 2017 and was re-signed by the club at the end of the month. Injuries and suspensions in the first team gave him an opportunity for more Ligue 2 action, and he played three times (and was on the bench another ten) before the end of the 2017–18 season.

Nîmes were promoted to Ligue 1 for the 2018–19 season, but Hsissane didn't make it on to the pitch. In June 2019 he left to sign for Le Puy in the Championnat National. Despite signing a two-year deal, he cancelled his contract at the end of the 2019–20 season when Le Puy were relegated, and after considering options abroad, signed for newly promoted Championnat National side Sète.

In June 2021, he signed with Toulon in the Championnat National 2.

== International career ==
Born in France and of Moroccan descent, Hsissane is a two-time international for the Morocco U21s.
