= Jean-Christophe Bouet =

French footballer (born 1983)

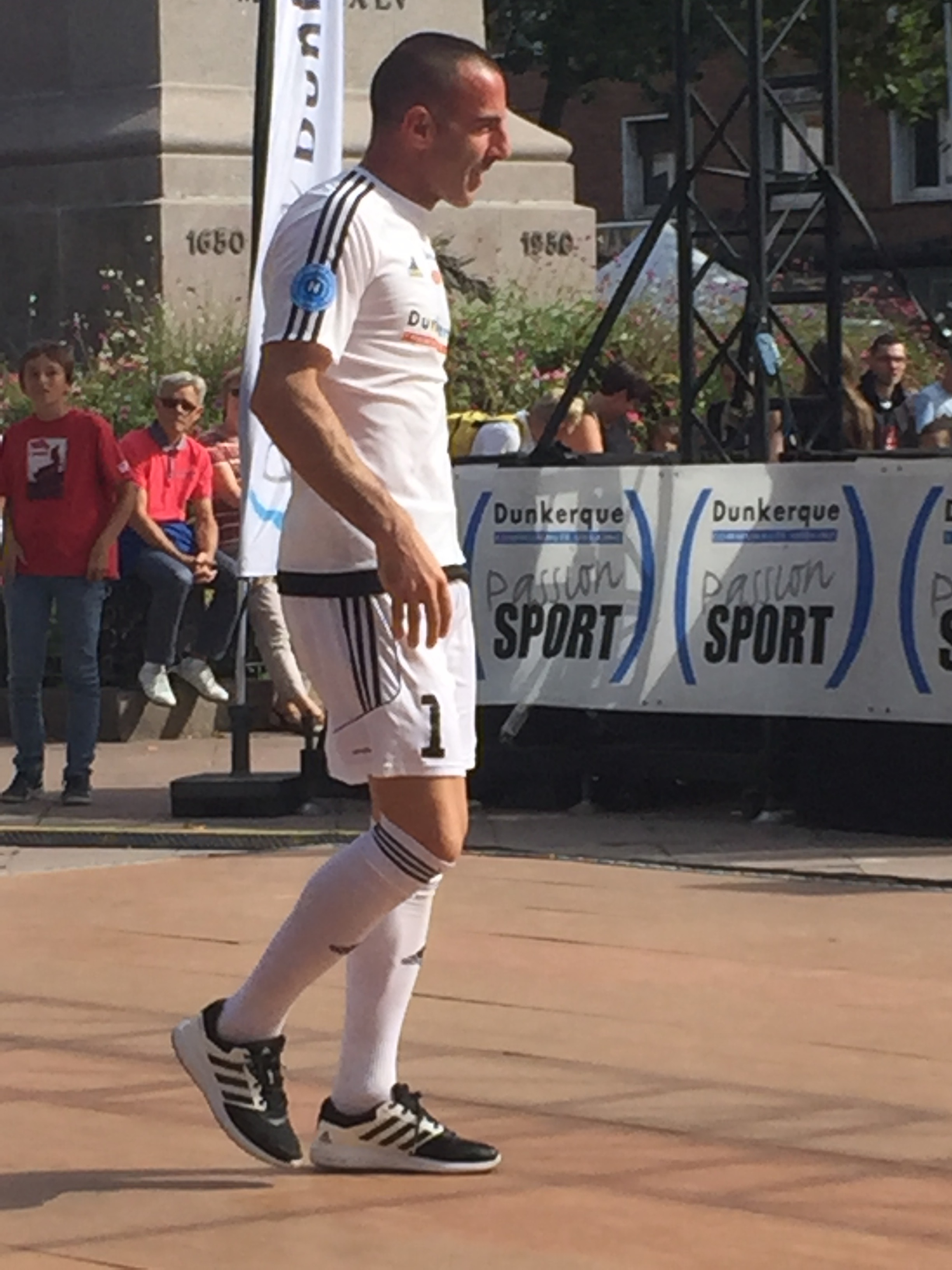
- Bouet in 2016

Personal information
- Date of birth: 21 July 1983 (age 43)
- Place of birth: Dax, France
- Height: 1.84 m (6 ft 0 in)
- Position: Goalkeeper

Team information
- Current team: Saint-Paul Sport
- Number: 1

Youth career
- 2002–2004: Bayonne

Senior career*
Years	Team	Apps	(Gls)
2004–2009	Bayonne	62	(0)
2009–2011	Villemomble Sports	61	(0)
2011–2013	Red Star	53	(0)
2013–2017	USL Dunkerque	120	(0)
2017–2018	Amiens	1	(0)
2018–2019	Laval	34	(0)
2019–2020	Bayonne	15	(0)
2020–2023	Villefranche	91	(0)
2023–	Saint-Paul Sport	9	(0)
- * Club domestic league appearances and goals as of 26 November 2023

Jean-Christophe Bouet (born 21 July 1983) is a French professional footballer who plays as a goalkeeper for Championnat National 3 club Saint-Paul Sport.

== Career ==
Bouet spent most of his playing career in the Championnat National, the third division in France. After a successful season with USL Dunkerque in the Championnat, Bouet at the age of 34 transferred to the Ligue 1 club Amiens SC on 20 July 2017.

Bouet made his professional debut at the age of 34 with Amiens in a 6–0 Coupe de France loss against FC Sochaux-Montbéliard on 7 January 2018. He was recalled in a 2–0 Coupe de la Ligue loss to Paris Saint-Germain on 10 January 2018, after the starting goalkeeper Régis Gurtner got a red card. He made his Ligue 1 debut in a 1–0 loss to OGC Nice on 13 January 2018.

In June 2018, Bouet signed a one-year deal with Laval, where he went on to play a full season as first-choice goalkeeper. For the 2019–20 season he returned to his first club Bayonne, a move which he claimed was "not a semi-retirement". In May 2020 he returned to the Championnat National with FC Villefranche. At the time of signing, the club refused to say whether he was second or third choice, but the subsequent departure of Alexis Sauvage to Laval handed Bouet the number one spot.
