= Sammy Vidal =

French association football player (born 1996)

Personal information
- Full name: Sammy Vidal
- Date of birth: 28 June 1996 (age 30)
- Place of birth: Paris, France
- Height: 1.68 m (5 ft 6 in)
- Position: Midfielder

Youth career
- 2010–2015: Paris FC
- 2016–2017: Montrouge
- 2017: Villemomble

Senior career*
Years	Team	Apps	(Gls)
2017–2018	Drancy	7	(2)
2018–2019	Red Star	3	(0)
2019	→ Furiani (loan)	10	(0)
2020–2021	Louhans-Cuiseaux	0	(0)
- * Club domestic league appearances and goals as of 18:13, 21 February 2020 (UTC)

Sammy Vidal (born 28 June 1996) is a French professional footballer who most recently played as a midfielder for Red Star.

== Professional career ==
Vidal is a youth product of Paris FC, and spent his early career in the lower divisions of France before joining Red Star F.C. in the summer of 2018. He made his professional debut with Red Star in a 0–0 Ligue 2 tie with Clermont Foot on 19 October 2018.

In January 2019, he was loaned to Furiani until the end of the season.

In September 2019, he negotiated termination of his Red Star contract, having only played three games for the clubs. Vidal was without club until the end of May 2020, where he signed with Louhans-Cuiseaux FC.

== Personal life ==
Born in France, Vidal is of Spanish and Algerian descent.
