= Pierre Bouysse =

French footballer

Personal information
- Height: 1.96 m (6 ft 5 in)
- Position: Goalkeeper

Team information
- Current team: Clermont Foot
- Number: 16

Senior career*
Years	Team	Apps	(Gls)
2001–2003	Aurillac FCA		
2003–2007	FC Gueugnon	16	(0)
2007–2008	Sedan	5	(0)
2008–	Clermont Foot	2	(0)
- * Club domestic league appearances and goals as of 15:44, 13 November 2009 (UTC)

Pierre Bouysse is a French former professional football player.

Bouysse began playing youth and amateur football as a goalkeeper with Aurillac FCA. He has played professionally in Ligue 2 for FC Gueugnon, CS Sedan Ardennes and Clermont Foot.
