= Lucas Toussaint =

French footballer (born 1996)

Personal information
- Date of birth: 29 March 1996 (age 30)
- Place of birth: Metz, France
- Height: 1.85 m (6 ft 1 in)
- Position: Defensive midfielder

Youth career
- 2001–2002: ASPTT Metz
- 2002–2004: AS Montigny-lès-Metz
- 2004–2014: Metz

Senior career*
Years	Team	Apps	(Gls)
2014–2016	Metz B	38	(1)
2015–2018	Metz	6	(0)
2016–2017	→ Seraing United (loan)	24	(1)
2017–2018	→ Pau (loan)	22	(1)
2018–2021	Quevilly-Rouen	56	(3)
2018–2021	Quevilly-Rouen B	7	(0)
2021–2023	Martigues	45	(0)

International career
2012–2013	France U17	2	(0)
2013–2014	France U18	3	(0)
2014	France U19	4	(0)
2015	France U20	1	(0)
- * Club domestic league appearances and goals as of 18 November 2023

Lucas Toussaint (born 29 March 1996) is a French professional footballer who plays as a defensive midfielder. He has represented France youth teams at levels up to and including France U20.

== Club career ==
Toussaint spent ten his formative years with Metz, making his debut with the first team in Ligue 2 at the age of 19, in the game against Sochaux on 7 August 2015.

On 7 July 2016, Metz announced Toussaint would join their satellite Belgian side Seraing United on a season-long loan. In late September 2017, Toussaint again went out on loan, this time to Pau in the French Championnat National. At the end of his Metz contract, he signed for Quevilly-Rouen in June 2018.

On 28 June 2021, Toussaint moved to Martigues.

== Honours ==
Martigues

- Championnat National 2: 2021–22
