= Rachid Alioui =

Footballer (born 1992)

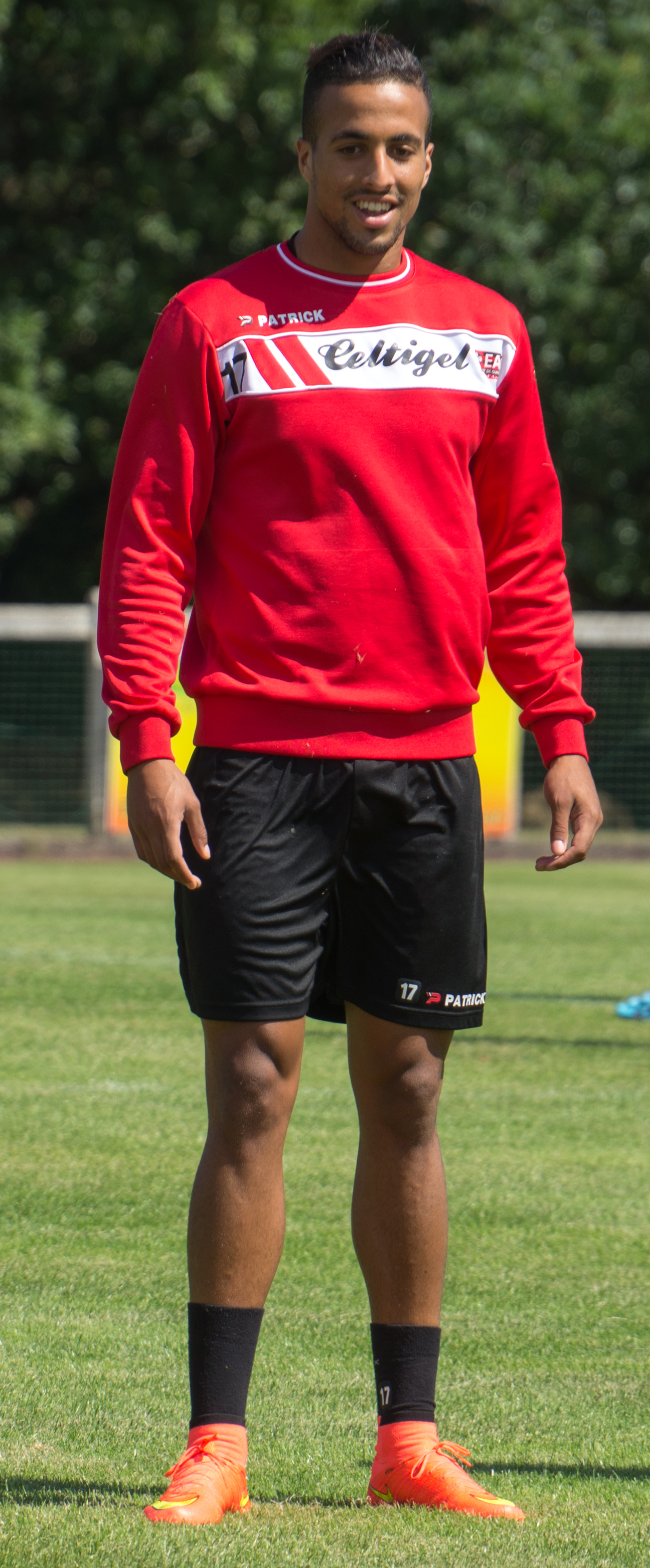
- Alioui with Guingamp in 2014

Personal information
- Date of birth: 18 June 1992 (age 34)
- Place of birth: La Rochelle, France
- Height: 1.86 m (6 ft 1 in)
- Position: Striker

Team information
- Current team: Toulon
- Number: 21

Youth career
- 1998–2004: OPMVS La Rochelle
- 2004–2005: Entente La Rochelle
- 2005–2006: La Rochelle Espoir
- 2006–2008: Sport Saint-Xandrais FC
- 2008: Entente Aunisienne d'Aytre
- 2008–2009: OPMVS La Rochelle
- 2009–2011: Guingamp

Senior career*
Years	Team	Apps	(Gls)
2011–2016	Guingamp	57	(5)
2012–2016	Guingamp B	20	(14)
2015–2016	→ Laval (loan)	33	(8)
2016–2019	Nîmes	91	(35)
2019–2022	Angers	29	(6)
2021–2022	→ Kortrijk (loan)	6	(1)
2022–2023	Versailles	24	(2)
2023–2024	Swift Hesperange	7	(3)
2024–	Toulon	4	(1)

International career
2011–2012	Morocco U23	3	(0)
2014–2019	Morocco	18	(2)
- * Club domestic league appearances and goals as of 23 November 2024

Rachid Alioui (born 18 June 1992) is a professional footballer who plays as a striker for Championnat National 1 club Toulon. Born in France, he played for the Morocco national team from 2014 to 2019, scoring two goals in eighteen appearances.

== Club career ==
On 7 July 2011, Alioui signed a one-year stagiaire (trainee) contract with Guingamp. He made his professional debut two weeks later scoring his first professional goal in a 2–0 win over Laval in the Coupe de la Ligue. A week later, he made his league debut appearing as a substitute in a 1–1 draw with Châteauroux.

On 5 July 2016, Alioui signed a three-year contract with Ligue 2 side Nîmes. Towards the end of his spell with Nîmes, Alioui suffered two leg injuries which prevented him from playing for more than nine months.

On 2 July 2019, Alioui agreed to a three-year contract with Ligue 1 club Angers. On 31 August 2021, he moved on loan to Belgian club Kortrijk.

== International career ==
Although eligible to play for France, Alioui has appeared for Morocco at various youth levels. He was called up and capped for friendly matches against Gambia U23 and Ivory Coast U23. He made his debut for the senior team in a 1–1 friendly tie with Gabon on 3 March 2014.

== Career statistics ==
=== Club ===
As of match played 15 December 2022

Appearances and goals by club, season and competition
Club	Season	League			National cup		League cup		Other		Total	
Club	Season	Division	Apps	Goals	Apps	Goals	Apps	Goals	Apps	Goals	Apps	Goals
Guingamp	2011–12	Ligue 2	19	1	0	0	2	1	—		21	2
Guingamp	2012–13	Ligue 2	15	1	2	0	1	0	—		18	1
Guingamp	2013–14	Ligue 1	16	3	3	0	1	0	—		20	3
Guingamp	2014–15	Ligue 1	7	0	2	0	2	0	2 (Note: One appearance in both UEFA Europa League and Trophée des Champions)	0	13	0
Guingamp	Total		57	5	7	0	6	1	2	0	72	6
Guingamp B	2012–13	CFA 2	8	4	—		—		—		8	4
Guingamp B	2013–14	CFA 2	4	1	—		—		—		4	1
Guingamp B	2014–15	CFA 2	8	9	—		—		—		8	9
Guingamp B	Total		20	14	—		—		—		20	14
Laval (loan)	2015–16	Ligue 2	33	8	1	0	4	1	—		38	9
Nîmes	2016–17	Ligue 2	26	13	0	0	1	0	—		27	13
Nîmes	2017–18	Ligue 2	38	17	2	0	1	0	—		41	17
Nîmes	2018–19	Ligue 1	27	5	1	0	2	0	—		30	5
Nîmes	Total		91	35	3	0	4	0	—		98	35
Angers	2019–20	Ligue 1	28	6	2	1	1	0	—		31	7
Angers	2020–21	Ligue 1	1	0	0	0	—		—		1	0
Angers	Total		29	6	2	1	1	0	—		32	7
Kortrijk (loan)	2021–22	First Division A	6	1	0	0	—		—		6	1
Versailles	2022–23	National	9	0	0	0	—		—		9	0
Career total			245	69	13	1	15	2	2	0	275	72

=== International ===
As of 29 July 2019

Appearances and goals by national team and year
National team	Year	Apps	Goals
Morocco	2014	1	0
Morocco	2016	4	1
Morocco	2017	3	1
Morocco	2019	2	0
Total		11	2

As of match played 29 July 2019
Scores and results list Morocco goal tally first, score column indicates score after each Alioui goal.

List of international goals scored by Rachid Alioui
No.	Date	Venue	Cap	Opponent	Score	Result	Competition
1	11 October 2016	Stade de Marrakech, Marrakesh, Morocco	3	Canada	4–0	4–0	Friendly
2	24 January 2017	Stade d'Oyem, Oyem, Gabon	8	Ivory Coast	1–0	1–0	2017 Africa Cup of Nations

== Honours ==
Guingamp

- Coupe de France: 2013–14
