= Hervé Lybohy =

Footballer (born 1983)

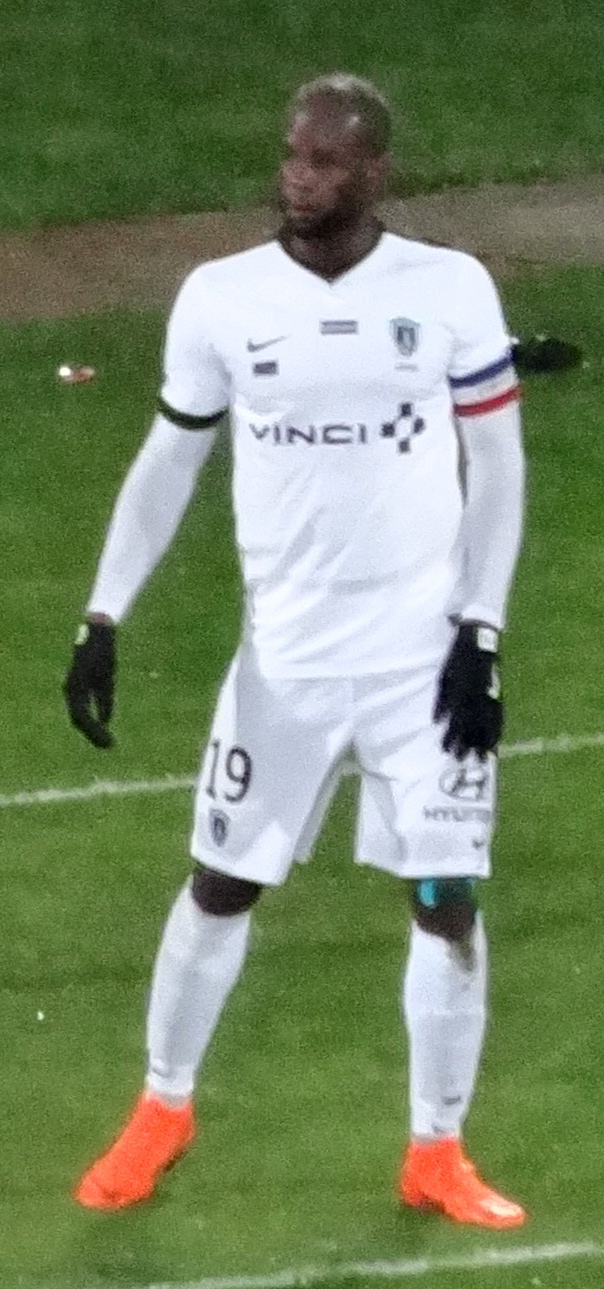
- Lybohy with Paris FC in 2018

Personal information
- Date of birth: 24 July 1983 (age 43)
- Place of birth: Bouaké, Ivory Coast
- Height: 1.85 m (6 ft 1 in)
- Position: Centre-back

Senior career*
Years	Team	Apps	(Gls)
2004–2006	Entente SSG	0	(0)
2006–2007	Saint-Quentin	31	(1)
2007–2008	Racing Club de France	25	(0)
2008–2009	Compiègne	26	(0)
2009–2010	Fréjus Saint-Raphaël	30	(1)
2010–2014	Amiens	128	(3)
2014–2018	Paris FC	124	(8)
2018–2019	Nîmes	17	(2)
2019	Nîmes	1	(0)
2019–2020	Nancy	24	(1)
2020–2021	Orléans	18	(0)
2021–2023	Thonon Evian	8	(0)
Total		432	(16)

International career
2019–2021	Niger	14	(0)
- * Club domestic league appearances and goals

Hervé Lybohy (born 24 July 1983) is a former professional footballer who played as a centre-back. Born in the Ivory Coast, he represented Niger at international level.

== Club career ==
In May 2018, it was announced Lybohy would join Nîmes, newly promoted to Ligue 1, from Ligue 2 side Paris FC on a free transfer for the 2018–19 season. He signed a one-year contract.

In July 2019, after one season in Ligue 1, Lybohy joined Nancy in Ligue 2.

In August 2020, Lybohy moved to Championnat National side Orléans. He signed a one-year contract with the option of a second.

In June 2023, after two seasons with Championnat National 2 club Thonon Evian, he retired from playing.

== International career ==
Lybohy was born in the Ivory Coast and is of Nigerien descent. He holds Ivorian, Nigerien and French nationalities. He made his debut for the Niger national team in October 2019.

== Honours ==
Thonon Evian

- Championnat National 3: 2021–22
