= Loïck Landre =

French footballer (born 1992)

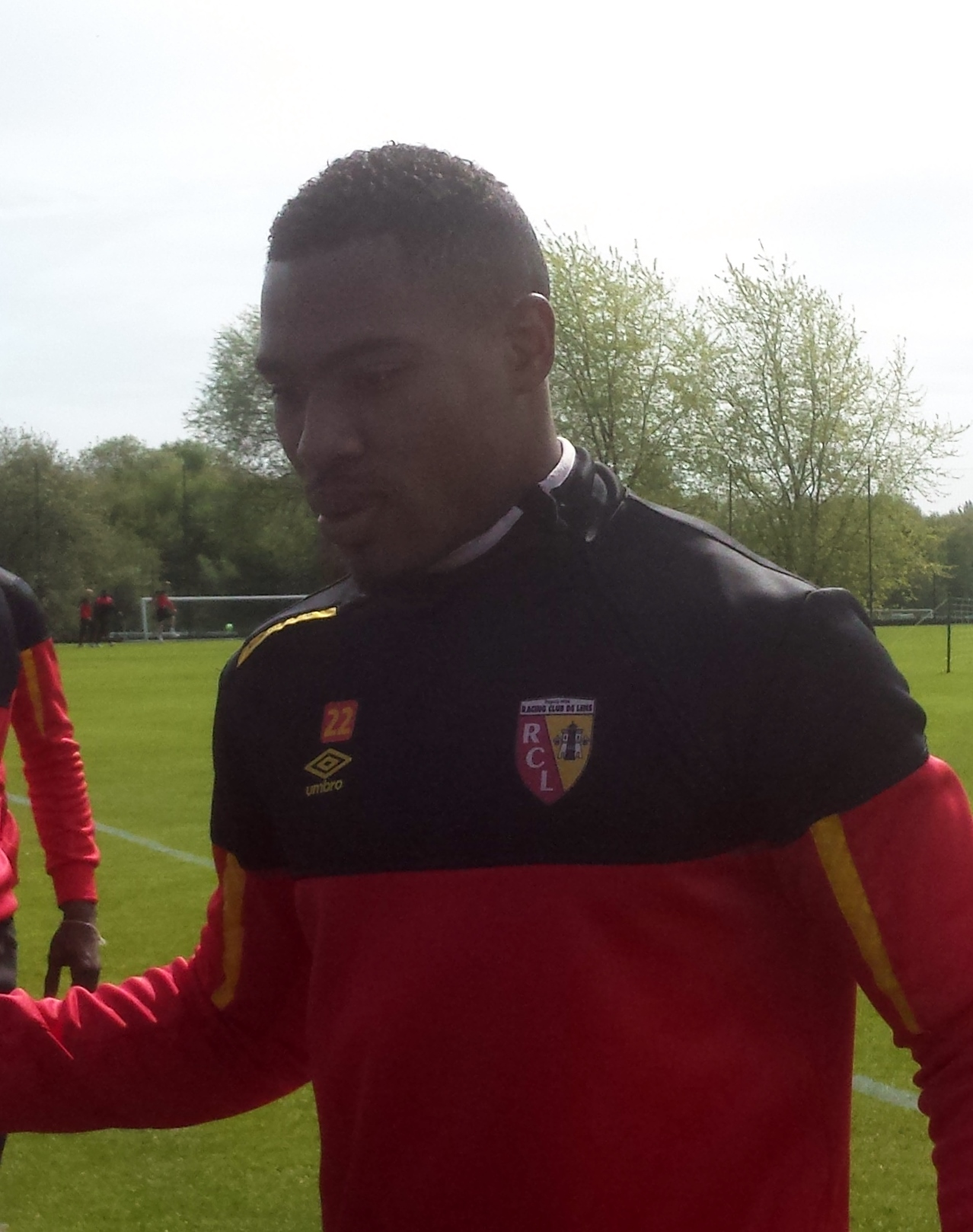
- Landre training with Lens in 2015

Personal information
- Date of birth: 5 May 1992 (age 34)
- Place of birth: Aubervilliers, France
- Height: 1.82 m (6 ft 0 in)
- Position: Defender

Youth career
- 1998–2005: Aubervilliers
- 2005–2011: Paris Saint-Germain

Senior career*
Years	Team	Apps	(Gls)
2011–2013	Paris Saint-Germain	1	(0)
2012	→ Clermont (loan)	12	(0)
2012–2013	→ Gazélec Ajaccio (loan)	24	(3)
2013–2017	Lens	79	(0)
2017–2018	Genoa	0	(0)
2017	→ Pisa (loan)	5	(0)
2018–2021	Nîmes	53	(5)
2021–2022	Manisa	29	(2)
2022–2023	Al-Shamal	21	(1)
2023–2024	A.E. Kifisia	10	(2)
2024–2025	Çorum	40	(2)
2025–2026	Valenciennes	27	(2)

International career^{‡}
2011	France U19	6	(0)
2011–2013	France U20	9	(1)
2013–2014	France U21	5	(2)
- * Club domestic league appearances and goals as of 23 June 2026 ‡ National team caps and goals as of 19:20, 4 September 2014 (UTC)

Loïck Landre (born 5 May 1992) is a French professional footballer who plays as a centre-back but can also be utilized as a right-back.

Landre is a France youth international having earned caps at under-19 and under-20 level.

== Career ==
On 20 June 2011, Landre signed his first professional contract agreeing to a three-year deal with Paris Saint-Germain until 2014. After going without an appearing during the fall campaign, he joined Ligue 2 team Clermont on loan and made his professional debut on 14 January 2012 in a league match against Amiens. Two weeks later, he received his first professional red card in a 2–1 win over Bastia. Landre is of Guadeloupean descent through his parents who are originally from Sainte-Rose. For the 2012–13 season, Landre signed a one-year loan deal with Gazélec Ajaccio.

On 18 July 2013, he left Paris to sign for Ligue 2 side RC Lens on a free transfer.

On 17 January 2017, Landre signed for Serie A side Genoa.

He moved to Nîmes Olympique in summer 2018.
