= Cuprammonium rayon =

Early cellulose fibre

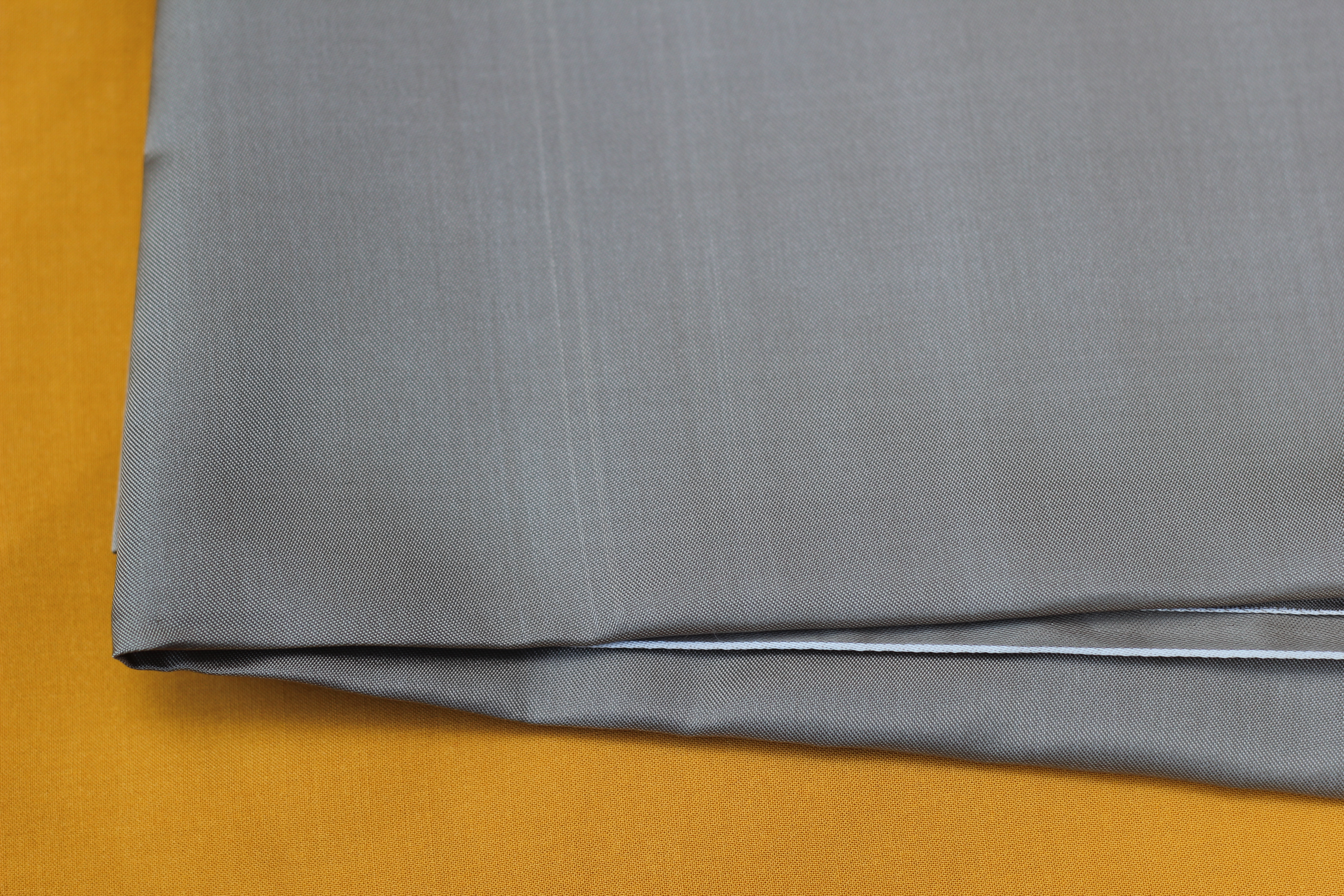
Brown cupra (also known as cupro or Bemberg) fabric made of rayon

Lab demonstration of the process. When a solution of cellulose in cuprammonium hydroxide comes into contact with sulfuric acid, the cellulose begins to precipitate from the solution. The sulfuric acid reacts with a complex compound of copper and dissolves it. Thin blue fibers of rayon are formed. After some time, sulfuric acid reacts with the complex compound and washes out the copper salts from the fibers. The fibers become colorless.

Cuprammonium rayon is a rayon fiber made from cellulose dissolved in a cuprammonium solution, Schweizer's reagent.

It is produced by making cellulose a soluble compound by combining it with copper and ammonia with caustic soda. The solution is passed through a spinneret and the cellulose is regenerated in hardening baths that remove the copper and ammonia and neutralize the caustic soda. Cuprammonium rayon is usually made in fine filaments that are used in suit jacket linings as well as lightweight summer dresses and blouses, sometimes in combination with cotton to make textured fabrics with slubbed, uneven surfaces.

The fabric is commonly known by the trade name "Bemberg", owned by the J.P. Bemberg company. The fabric may also be known as "cupro" or "cupra". It is also known as "ammonia silk" on Chinese fashion retail websites.

== History ==
Cuprammonium rayon was invented in 1890.

Swiss chemist Matthias Eduard Schweizer (1818–1860) discovered that cellulose dissolves in tetraaminecopper dihydroxide. Max Fremery and Johann Urban developed a method to produce carbon fibers for use in light bulbs in 1897 (the factory closed in 1902). Production of cuprammonium rayon for textiles started in 1899 in the Vereinigte Glanzstoff Fabriken AG in Oberbruch near Aachen. An improvement by J. P. Bemberg AG in 1904 made the artificial silk a product comparable to real silk.

== Properties ==
- The fibers are very fine
- It has a soft, silk-like handle (i.e., tactile feel)
- It has similar properties to cotton. It is different in that the average degree of polymerization is lower and a larger part of this fiber is occupied by amorphous regions, causing cuprammonium rayon to swell
- It burns rapidly and chars at 180°C
- On ignition, it leaves behind ash containing copper
- It can be used to create fabric that is sheer and lightweight and has desirable draping properties

== Production ==
Cellulose is dissolved in a [Cu(NH_{3})_{4}](OH)_{2} solution and then regenerates as rayon when extruded into sulfuric acid.
