= Vereinigte Glanzstoff-Fabriken =

German artificial fiber manufacturer

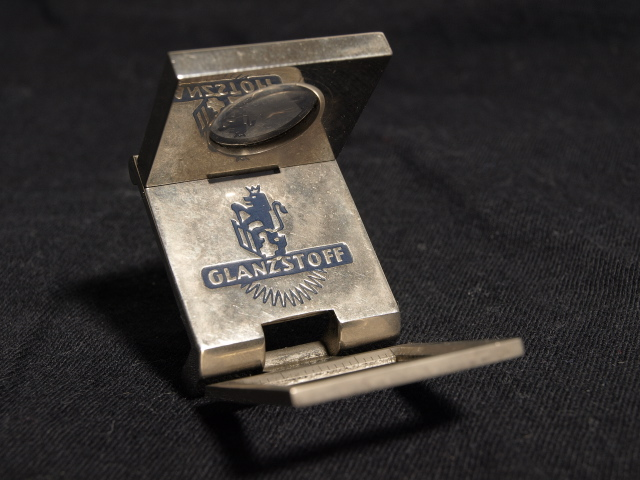
- A "thread counter", folding magnifying glass with the logo of the Vereinigte Glanzstoff-Fabriken
- Type: Manufacturer
- Industry: Artificial finer
- Predecessor: J. P. Bemberg
- Founded: 19 September 1899
- Founders: Max Fremery and Johann Urban
- Defunct: 1969
- Successor: Akzo
- Headquarters: Wuppertal, North Rhine-Westphalia, Germany, Germany

Vereinigte Glanzstoff-Fabriken (VGF, United Rayon Factories (Note: "Vereinigte Glanzstoff Fabriken" may be literally translated "United Shimmering Fabrics Companies".)) was a German manufacturer of artificial fiber founded in 1899 that became one of the leading European producers of rayon.

During the first thirty years VGF cooperated closely with the British manufacturer Courtaulds and other companies to share technology and maintain prices by avoiding competition. It merged with the Dutch firm Enka in 1929 under the holding company Algemene Kunstzijde Unie (AKU), but the two retained their legal identities. AKU made significant investments in rayon production in the United States. The company suffered government interference in Nazi Germany (1933–45) and lost competitive strength during World War II, but partly recovered after the war with American assistance.

In 1969 AKU merged with the Dutch manufacturer KZO to form AKZO, now part of AkzoNobel. Successor companies formed during various divestitures, mergers and acquisitions continue to be active in various related industries.

== Origins ==
In 1857 the Swiss chemist Matthias Eduard Schweizer (1818–60) found that cotton could be dissolved in a solution of copper salts and ammonia and then regenerated. In 1890 the French chemist Louis Henri Despeissis invented the cuprammonium process for spinning fibers from cotton dissolved in Schweizer's reagent. Despeissis died in 1892 and his patent was not renewed.

Max Fremery (1859–1932), a German chemist, and Johann Urban (1863–1940), an Austrian engineer, were manufacturing lamp filaments in Oberbruch near Aachen in 1891 using cotton and Schweizer's reagent. Fremery and Urban decided to start making artificial silk (Glanzstoff), and patented a version of the Despeissis process with the addition of a practical method for spinning the fiber. They filed the patent under the name of Dr. Hermann Pauly (1870–1950) (Note: Dr. Hermann Pauly of the Mönchengladbach technical school let his name be used on the patent for the VGF cuprammonium process, but was not further involved in development of the product.) so as not to alert their competitors. The patent was challenged but was upheld. Fremery and Urban moved their headquarters to Elberfeld, now a suburb of Wuppertal. Vereinigte Glanzstoff-Fabriken (VGF) was launched on 19 September 1899 with 2 million marks of capital. The Bergisch-Märkischen bank provided financing.

== Early years (1899–1918) ==
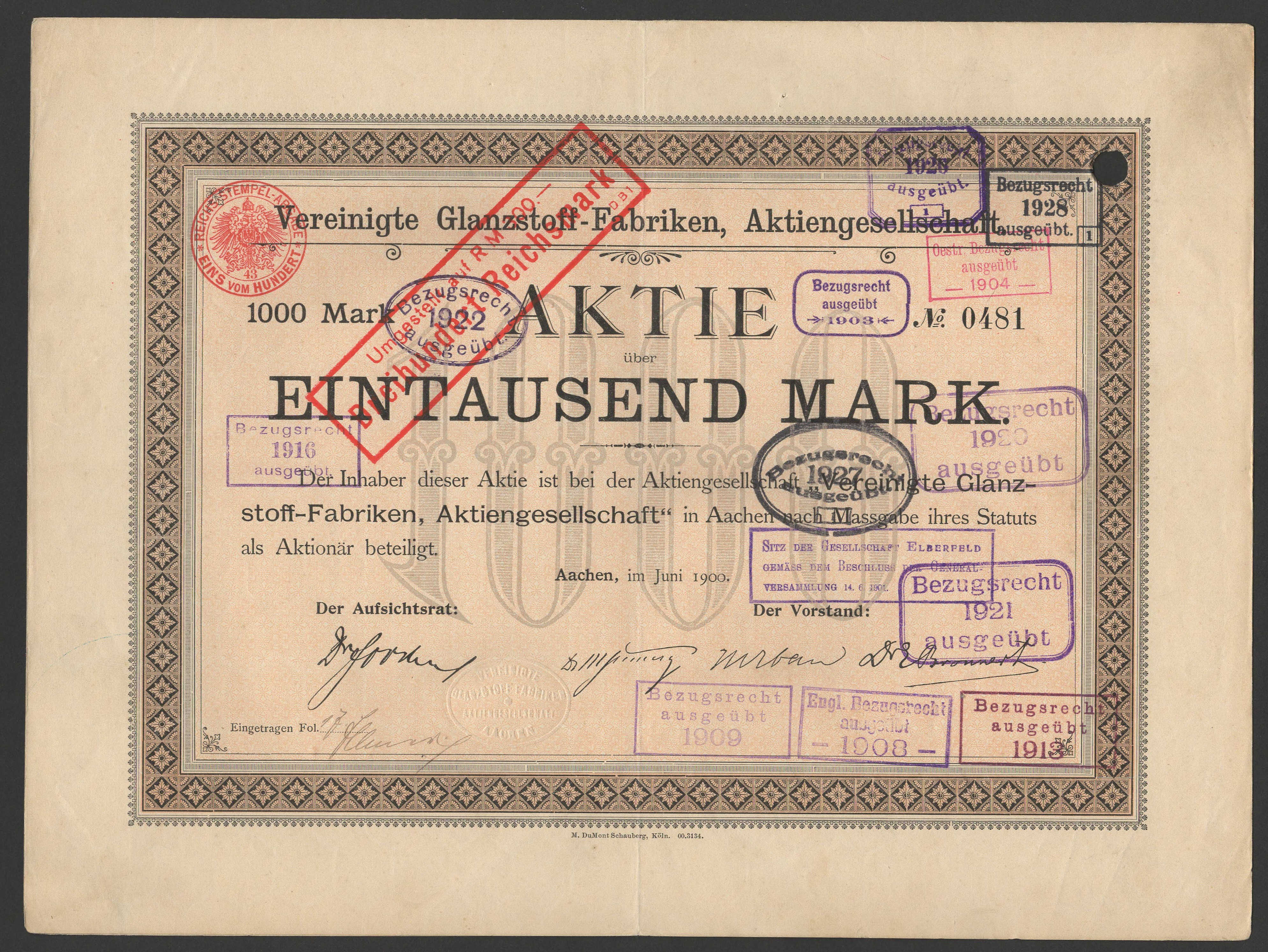
Share of the Vereinigte Glanzstoff-Fabriken AG, issued June 1900

The VGF rayon that began to be sold early in 1900 had relatively coarse yarns of 100–200 denier. Although VGF's product was less versatile than rayon produced by the viscose process the scale of the operation allowed for reduced prices. Fremery and Urban, with the Alsatian textile chemist David Emil Bronnert (1868–1928), took out two more basic patents in 1900. In 1900, the first year of operation, profits were $15,480. The company set up two smaller plants in Alsace, and in 1903 started manufacturing in Givet, France. Profits were $422,000 by 1904 and continued to grow in following years. Between 1901 and 1911 the labor force increased to 6.7 times the initial level, and production increased to 16.3 times the initial level. VGF was profitable throughout the period before World War I. Production rose from 86 tons in 1902 to 820 tons in 1912. In 1906 VGF opened a facility in Sankt Pölten, Austria, and in 1908 opened a plant in Flint, Wales.

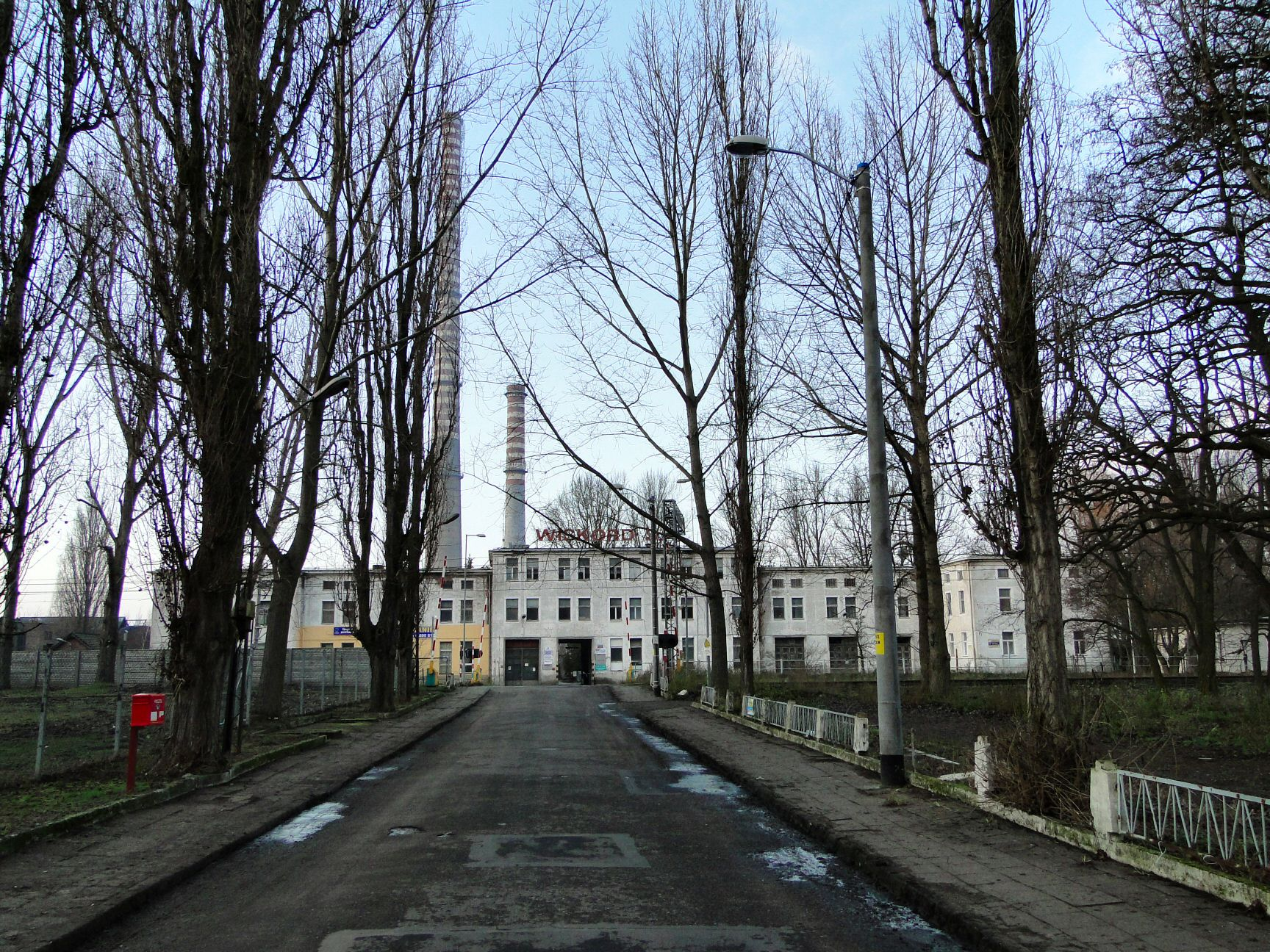
Donnersmarck plant in Szczecin, Poland, formerly Stettin

It was clear by 1909–10 that viscose, with its cheaper raw materials and simpler spinning process, was economically superior to cuprammonium. In July 1911 the chairman of VGF, Hans Jordan, decided to pay 2 million marks for all the German patent rights for the viscose process and for the Donnersmarcks Kunstseide und Acetatwerke near Stettin. He planned to fully convert the Donnersmarcks plant to the viscose process. The company headed by Count Guido Henckel von Donnersmarck (1830–1916) had been the first in Germany to use the viscose process invented by Courtaulds in Britain. VGF quickly expanded viscose production.

Around 1911 VGF began to invest in J. P. Bemberg, a cloth dyeing and finishing company that had been experimenting with a version of the cuprammonium process, and encouraged Bemberg to focus on producing yarns for which that process was suitable. Bemberg was using the "stretch-spinning" process invented by the chemist Edmund Thiele (1867–1927) to make cuprammonium rayon with equally fine filaments to the artificial silk of Hilaire de Chardonnet (1839–1924), and with better physical properties. The VGF product was not competitive. Although Thiele had applied for a patent on his process, a German court ruled on 4 May 1907 that it had been anticipated by the "Pauly" patent.

For some time VGF, Courtaulds and the French Comptoir des Textiles Artificiels dominated the rayon market. Courtaulds became concerned about competition from VGF after the purchase of the Donnersmarck viscose plant, and initiated discussions on ways to avoid harmful competition. VGF and Courtaulds headed a European rayon cartel formed in 1911. Under the 1911 agreements the companies gained domestic monopolies, shared the basic patents and agreed to share future advances made by any of the members of the cartel. The companies planned to form a consortium that would coordinate sales, set prices and production volumes, and share profits in each region, but were unable to agree on a formal contract before the outbreak of World War I (1914–18).

During the war VGF focused on producing the staple fiber later called rayon, which was spun together with cotton. The German government, faced with a cotton shortage due to the Allied blockade, ordered 3,000 tons of viscose staple from VGF, which was used for a variety of military textiles including clothing. Consumers saw the rayon fabrics as inferior to cotton and associated it with wartime privations. The Niedermorschweiler plant was destroyed by fire during the war. Germany's defeat in the war cost the company market share both domestically and internationally.

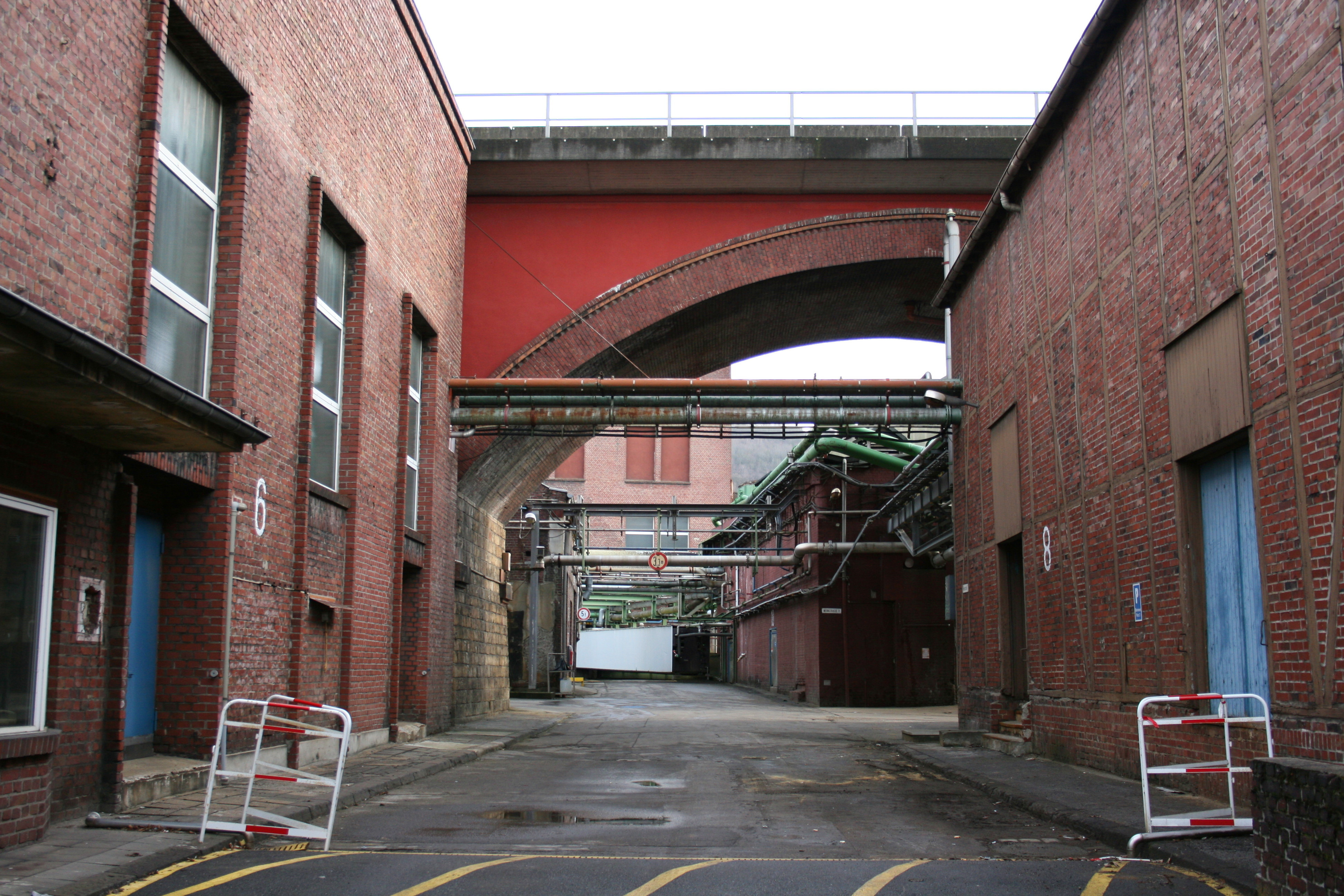
J. P. Bemberg AG facilities in Wuppertal

== Weimar Republic (1919–33) ==
In the inter-war period VGF was the largest rayon producer in continental Europe. However, competition developed from companies in the United States, the Netherlands and Italy. VGF steadily increased its holdings in Bemberg and gained full control in 1920. In 1922 VGF invested in a new Japanese firm in partnership with Shitagau Noguchi (1873–1944) and Asahi Chemicals. The technology was licensed under conditions that prevented competition in VGF's home market, and ensured that VGF would receive the rights to any technical advances made in Japan. VGF built a factory in Obernburg in 1924. (Note: The Obernburg plant continued to produce fiber in 2015, now owned by a successor company. In 2015 the Obernburg industrial park (Industrie Center Obernburg, ICO) was home to 24 other companies that rented premises and used the well-developed infrastructure.)

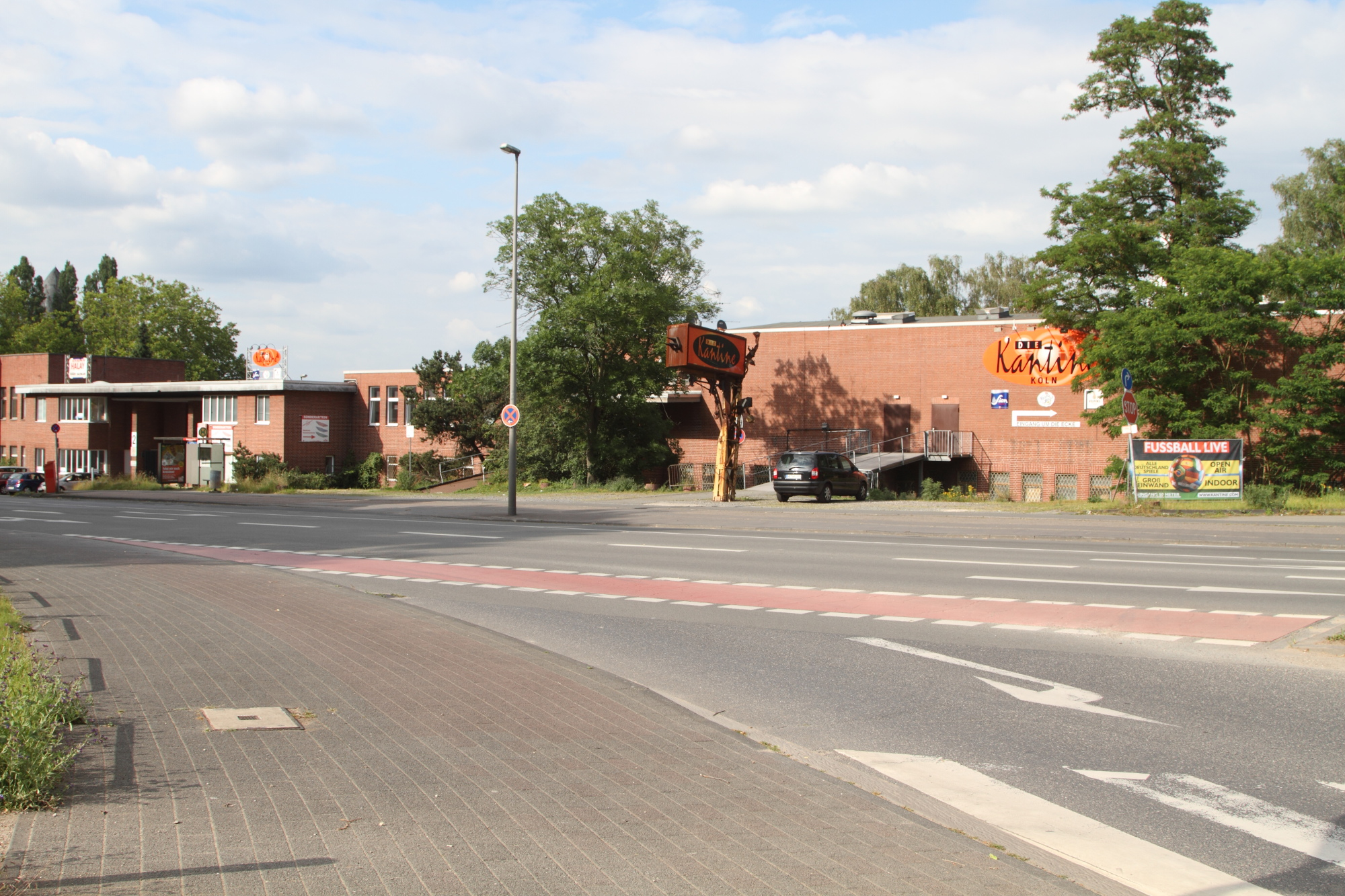
Factory gate and former administrative building of Glanzstoff Courtaulds in Niehl, Cologne

The European rayon price cartel was formed again after 1925. The arrangement was a form of cartel in which rayon patents and technology were shared between the partners. VGF, Courtaulds and the Comptoir shared technical advances until shortly before World War II (1939–45). VGF initiated lawsuits against IG Farben over rayon technology, but dropped them in 1924–25 when IG Farben agreed to join a price cartel in Germany and to reduce its production of rayon. In 1925 I. G. Farben acquired a stake in VGF and Bemberg. The joint venture with I. G. Farben lasted until the latter closed its Hölken rayon plant in 1929.

In 1925 Courtaulds and VGF founded a joint venture named Glanzstoff Courtaulds to build and operate a large viscose manufacturing facility in Cologne. In April 1928 Glanzstoff Courtaulds began artificial silk production in the north of Cologne. In 1927 Courtaulds and VGF combined to buy a controlling interest in the Italian manufacturer SNIA Viscosa. A German director of VGF, Karl Scherer, replaced the company founder Riccardo Gualino (1879–1964) as head of the firm and cut output drastically.

In April 1925 Fritz Blüthgen (Note: Fritz Blüthgen was a managing director of VGF. In November 1928 he became chairman of the VGF American subsidiary, the Associated Rayon Company (ARC), when it was incorporated in Maryland, US.) of VGF, suggested a joint venture with Courtaulds in the United States. When Courtaulds declined, VGF entered the US market in competition with Courtaulds. J. P. Bemberg and VGF organized the American Bemberg Corporation in 1925, and began making rayon using the cuprammonium process in October 1926 at a newly built facility near Elizabethton, Tennessee, nine miles from Johnson City, Tennessee. In the fall of 1928 VGF opened a viscose factory nearby. This was operated by the VGF subsidiary North American Rayon. By 1929 Bemberg and VGF had about 5,000 employees in the United States. The city of Elizabethton provided tax concessions and favorable rates for the large amounts of water used in rayon production. There were ongoing labor problems, starting with a strike in March 1929, but the plants operated profitably throughout the Great Depression.

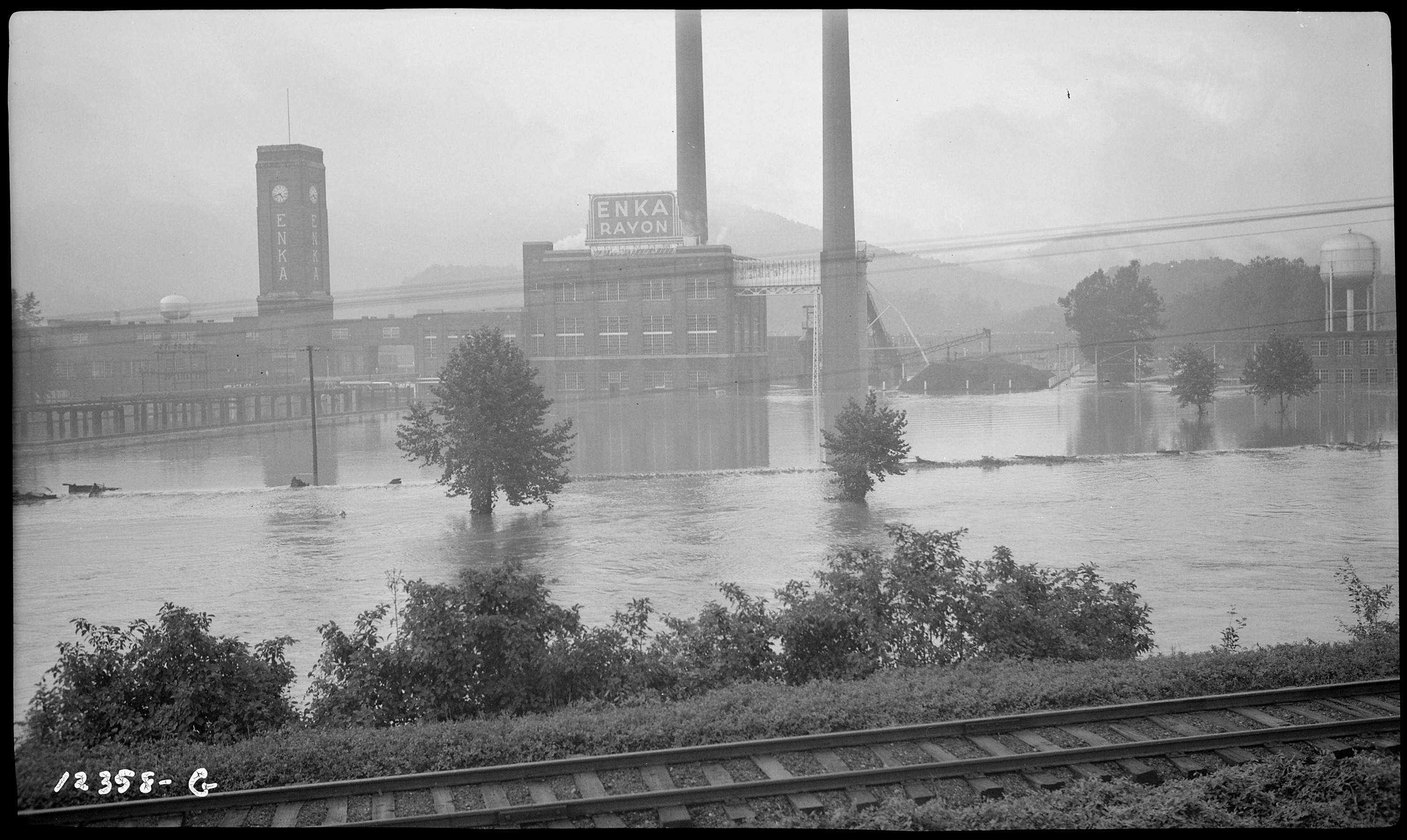
American Enka Rayon Plant at Graham, North Carolina (1940)

As of 1929 VGF had a workforce of 13,400 in Germany, and was chaired by Fritz Blüthgen. Although thriving, VGF was deeply in debt. That year Oscar Schlitter (1868–1939) of the Deutsche Bank arranged for VGF to combine with Nederlandsche Kunstzijde (Enka). (Note: The common name "Enka" comes from the Dutch pronunciation of the initials N.K. (Nederlandsche Kunstzijdefabriek).) Enka was based in Arnhem, Netherlands. It had been founded in 1911. A new German-Dutch company was created, Algemene Kunstzijde Unie (AKU), through an exchange of shares. Enka, VGF and Bemberg remained distinct legal entities owned by AKU as a holding company. The AKU supervisory board had four members from the Dutch group, four from the German group and one neutral member. (Note: Another source says the AKU supervisory board included three representatives each from Enka and VGF, plus one from Courtaulds.) Enka remained technologically behind the German facilities, and was relatively under-equipped. The German plants accounted for the bulk of AKU's production, and made 60% of the viscose in Germany in the early 1930s. VGF had five members of the seven-person management committee.

Enka competed with Courtaulds with a factory in Britain established before the merger. After the merger AKU continued to operate in Britain despite strong protests from Courtaulds and lengthy negotiations to try to resolve the issue. AKU also had subsidiaries in Italy, Czechoslovakia and Austria. After the 1929 merger AKU opened a viscose plant in Asheville, North Carolina. The plant was operated by the American Enka Company, which had been organized in 1928. The company became the third largest rayon manufacturer in the United States after Courtaulds and DuPont. In 1930 VGF used lawsuits as a bargaining counter with Châtillon S.p.A. to ensure that imports of rayon from Italy to Germany were controlled. In the 1930s VGF was deeply in debt to Enka, a situation that worsened as VGF bonds issued and sold in the US were bought up by the Dutch. The percentage of German ownership in AKU steadily declined.

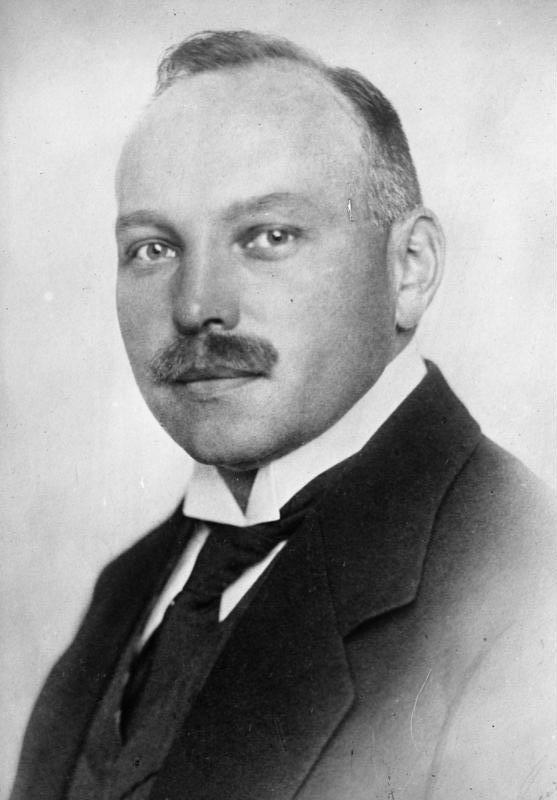
Emil Georg von Stauss played an important role in the pre-war Nazi period

== Nazi era (1933–45) ==
A bitter internal management dispute blew up in 1933 when two VGF executives, Carl Benrath and Willi Springorum, were accused of rigging the books. Benrath in turn attacked the Deutsche Bank executive and AKU supervisory board member Oscar Schlitter. Benrath wrote to another Deutsche Bank executive, Emil Georg von Stauss (1877–1942), "We live in a New Germany in which – thank the Lord – the honor of the individual is protected by a strong hand. I too rely on this protection and I am sure that I will come into my rights." Benrath and Springorum had to resign from AKU, while Schlitter was made the "neutral" delegate on the AKU supervisory board and Stauss was appointed to the board.

Stauss helped the company through his contacts in government. The regime wanted to reduce reliance on imported fiber by increasing domestic manufacturing, and one Nazi Party expert on textiles proposed that AKU should be taken over by I.G. Farben, a true German company. AKU responded by increasing the amount of production in Germany. AKU cut back production in the Dutch factories in Ede and Arnhem, and the Deutsche Bank helped the VGF interests to buy up Dutch shares.

The company gained from government-generated demand for its products, and from the cotton and wool import restrictions implemented in the 1934 New Plan. By 1934 Glanzstoff Courtaulds was employing 3,000 men and women. VGF increased production by 600% from 1933 to 1941. The company made rayon and also a tyre-corduroy using synthetic thread that the Ministry of German Basic and Raw Materials ordered on a large scale. However, they lost international market share and lost contact with foreign innovations as Nazi Germany became increasingly isolated in the period before World War II.

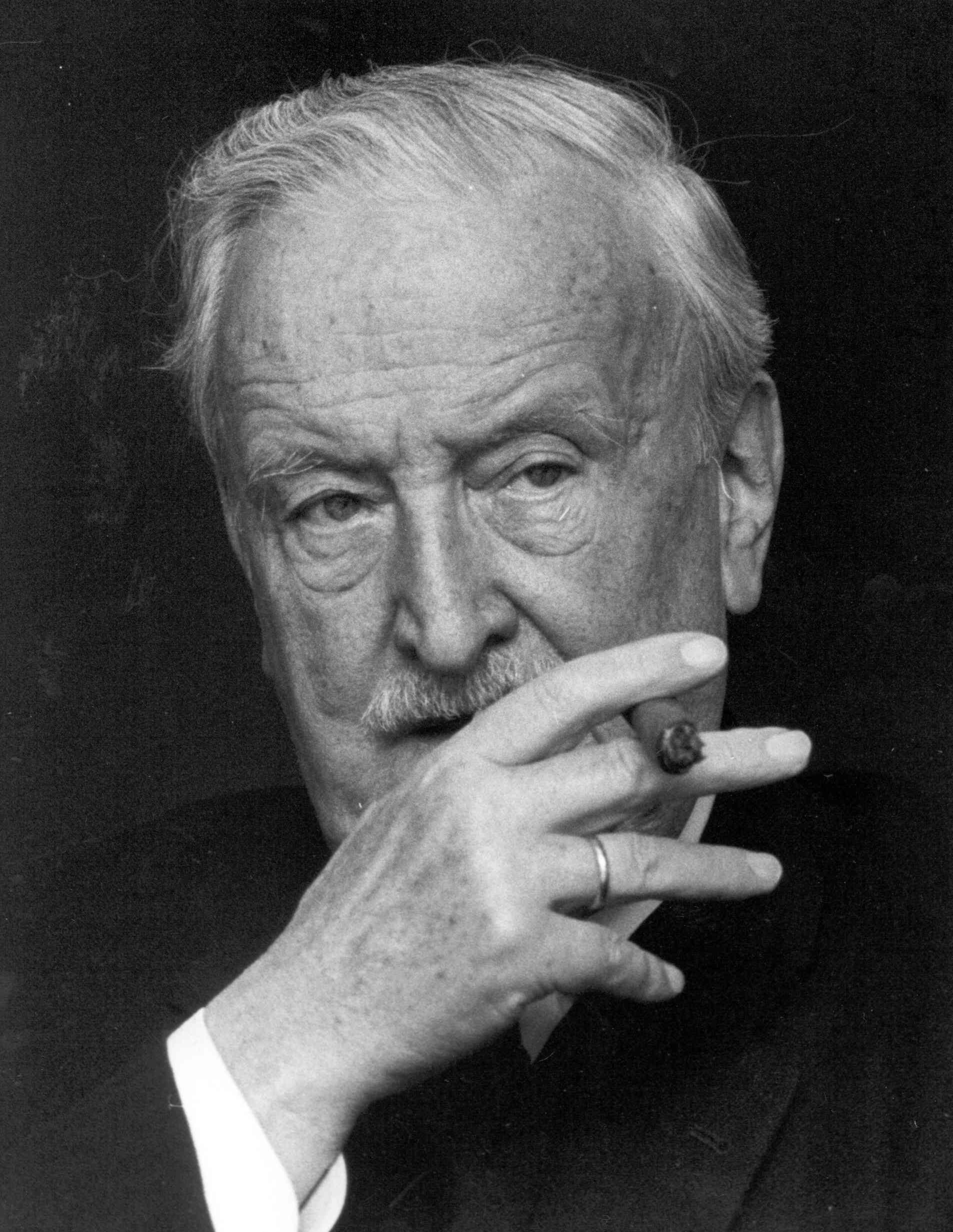
Hermann Josef Abs joined the supervisory board in May 1939 and remained active after World War II

In 1937 Stauss was asked by Hermann Göring's Office for Raw Materials whether there were plans to nationalize VGF. VGF responded that it was necessary for AKU to appear to be a Dutch company with mainly Dutch ownership so as to protect its American assets. In 1939 the two companies in Elizabethtown, Tennessee had about 4,600 employees, and American Enka near Asheville, North Carolina had 2,850. The American rayon industry benefited from protective tariffs and the fashionable short skirts, which created demand for smooth, sheer stockings. The European giants dominated production, which was concentrated in the southeast. AKU had 16% of the world market for artificial fibers in 1939, with 31 plants.

In May 1939 Göring, who had come to believe that Strauss had been bribed to support an anti-German position, forced all the German members of the AKU Delegates Committee to resign. They were replaced by four new members including Hermann Josef Abs (1901–94) of the Deutsche Bank and Baron Kurt von Schröder (1889–1966) of Bankhaus Stein, Cologne. There were plans to reinstate Benrath and others who had been forced out in 1933, but these were dropped in face of violent objections by the Dutch members. Ernst Hellmut Vits (1903–70) joined VGF in 1940 and was CEO and chairman of the executive board for the next thirty years.

During World War II (1939–45) the Glanzstoff Courtaulds plant continued full production. From 1940 Jewish forced laborers from Cologne and the surroundings worked at the factory. They were deported to Minsk in July 1942. The factory also employed workers from the occupied territories in the east as well as French prisoners of war, workers from France, the Netherlands and Belgium, and in August 1944 Italian prisoners of war (most of them refused to cooperate). With the Allied advance to the Rhine in 1944 many workers were assigned to defense works, but the factory still employed 900 German and 400 foreign workers in early 1945. Early in 1942 the US Office of Alien Property (OAP) seized control of the Elizabethton plants, although it chose not to seize the assets since they were partly owned by the Dutch.

== Post-war (1945–1969) ==
After the war the Stettin plant, now in Poland, became property of the Polish state. (Note: The Stettin plant was renamed Panstwowa Fabryka Sztucznego Jedwabiu nr 1 (National Artificial Silk Factory No. 1). It was reopened, and the first fibers were produced on 1 May 1948. The company, now called Wiskord SA and the largest producer of viscose rayon in Poland, declared bankruptcy in July 2000.) The Glanzstoff Courtaulds factory suffered only minor bomb damage during the war, and quickly resumed full production after the war ended. VGF had fallen behind its American competitors, and depended on American "development aid" to recover. In 1947 AKU ceded all the US property of VGF to the OAP, including physical assets, working capital, patents and trademarks. The properties were sold to Beaunit Mills of New York in December 1948.

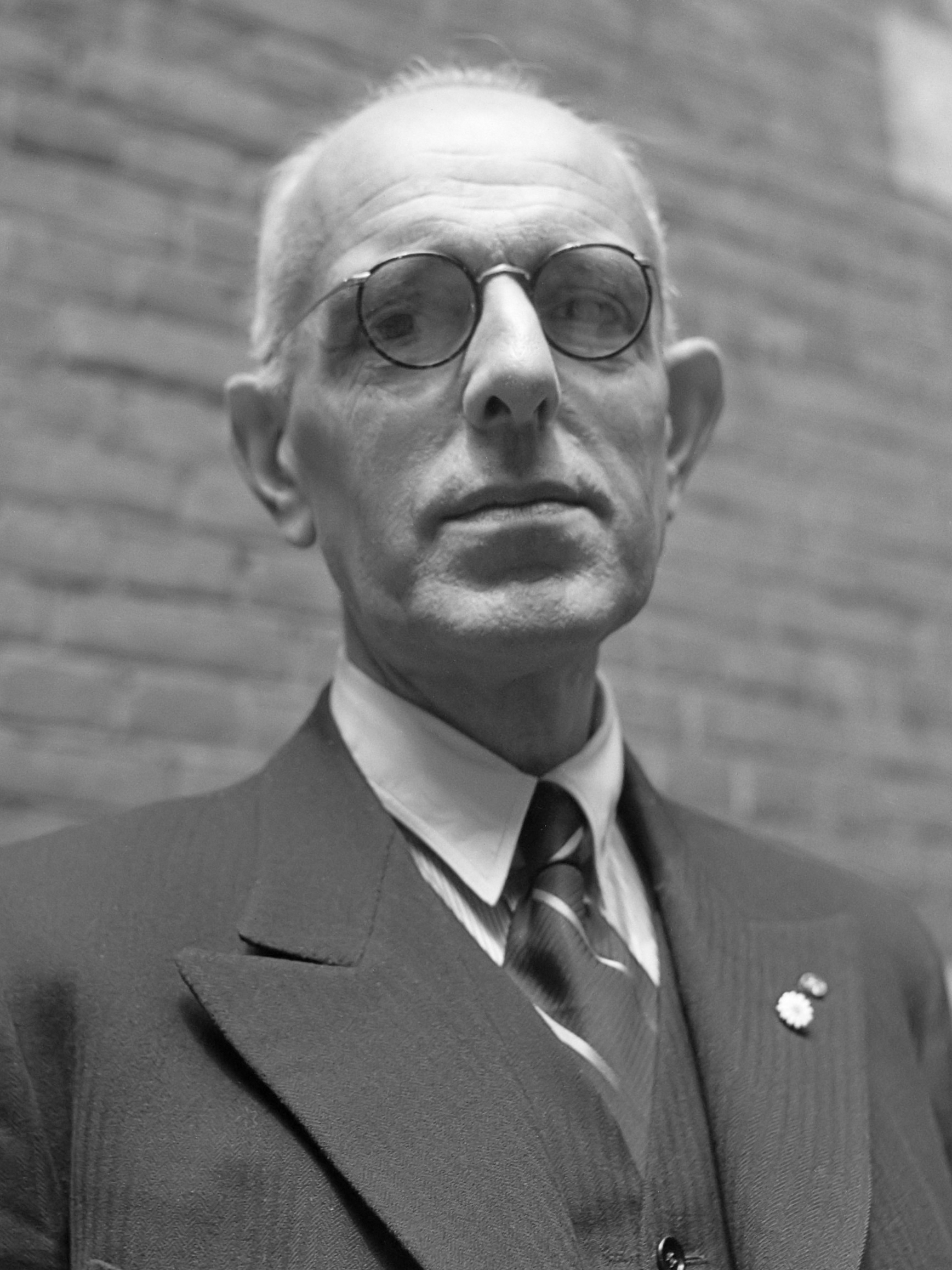
Steef van Schaik (1888–1968) was chief executive of AKU from 1948

Steef van Schaik (1888–1968), who had served in various senior management positions in Enka and AKU from 1919, and was Dutch minister of Transport of Energy from 25 June 1945 to 2 July 1946, was CEO of AKU from 1 August 1948 to 1 July 1954. AKU began to produce Cordenka rayon tire yarns in Arnhem in 1948. Enka retained ownership of American Enka, and in 1953 still held 56% of shares, although the management was mostly American. That year American Enka began to produce nylon at a new plant in Asheville. A 1957 article in Business Week said Enka "believes its technical and other information exchange with American Enka is more important than the profit from ownership of Enka shares."

In 1950 VGF was the largest German manufacturer of artificial fibers, with a management team strongly oriented towards the United States. That year the company opened a new perlon fiber facility. In 1953 VGF had a workforce of 10,840 in Germany. In 1957 VGF reported sales of 383 million DM. In 1960 there were 17 registered companies in the AKU group in eight countries, including VGF. By 1965 sales were 1,374 million DM, and the company had 29,000 employees. However, the company struggled to make new commercial synthetic fibers, handicapped by lack of technical capability in polymers.

In 1962 the chemical producer BASF began to explore the possibility of forward integration in fiber manufacturing. Carl Wurster (1900–74) of BASF entered into discussions on close cooperation in manufacturing fiber with Ernst Hellmut Vits and Hermann Josef Abs. BASF wanted to purchase a 25% share of VGF, obtain exclusive supply contracts and undertake joint research into raw materials and synthetic fibers. The VGF executives were "sympathetic" to the concept, but required the consent of their main shareholder, the AKU Group of the Netherlands. Negotiations continued until mid-1974, but AKU would not grant BASF any stake. The two companies did agree to extend chemical supply contracts until 1980, and to discuss any plans by BASF to enter fiber manufacturing or by VGF to start making chemicals.

When BASF purchased the rayon manufacturer Phrix in 1967, VGF protested that "BASF was in breach of contract with VGF in every way because of the Phrix acquisition." VGF was concerned that BASF would become a serious competitor in a market where it was already struggling with falling prices, and warned that it would now feel free to negotiate much more aggressively on the prices it was willing to pay for chemicals. In 1968 AKU merged with Glanzstoff, which had been producing "Cordenka" rayon tire yarns in Obernburg since 1938, and formed Enka Glanzstoff. Ernst Hellmut Vits became chairman of the AKU supervisory board in 1969.

== Successor companies (from 1969) ==
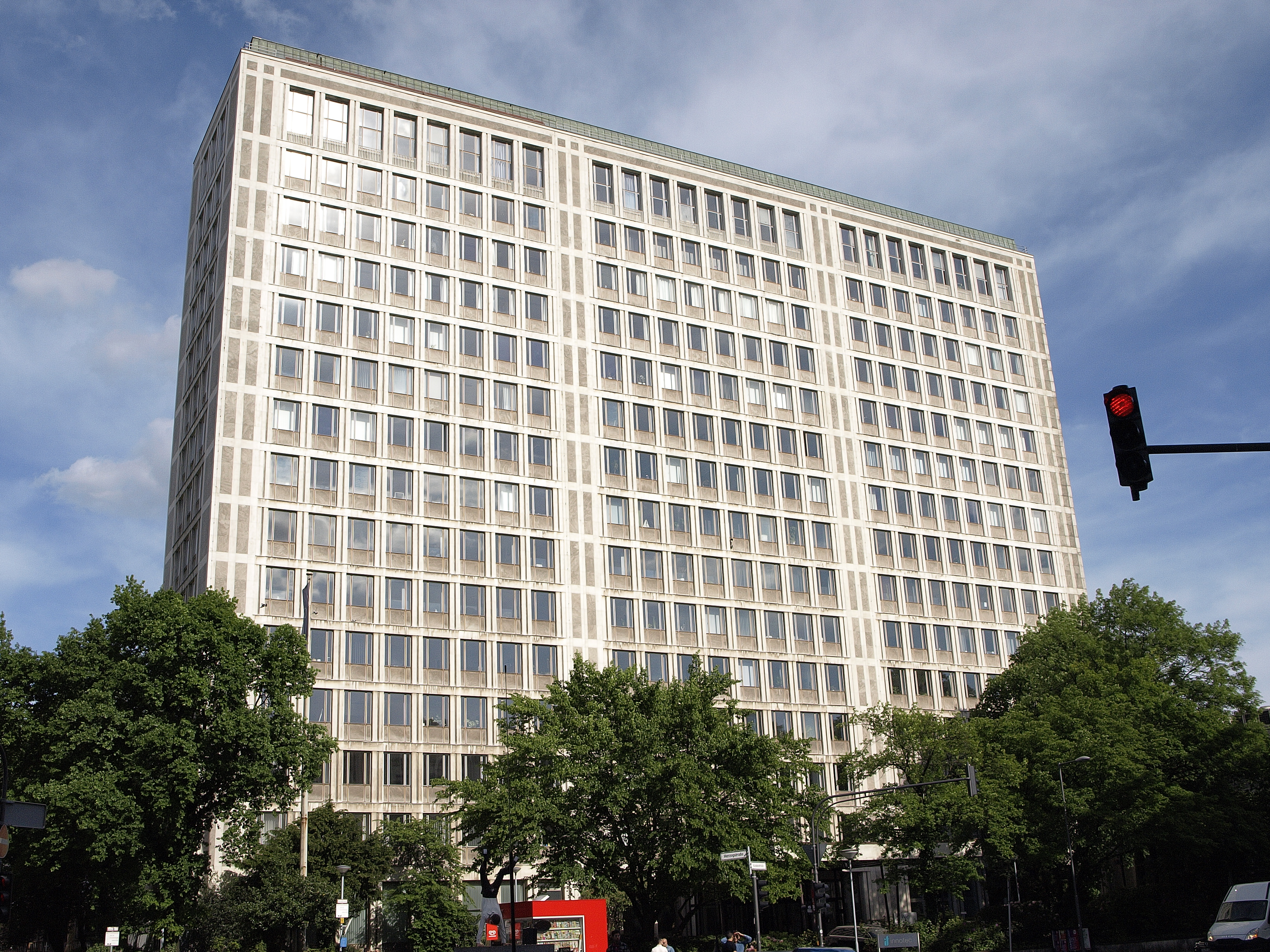
Glanzstoff office building on Kasinostraße in Wuppertal-Elberfeld

In 1969 AKU merged with the Dutch company Koninklijke Zout Organon (KZO), a manufacturer of coatings, drugs and detergents, to form a new company named Akzo.

The fiber business continued to operate as Enka Glanzstoff, renamed Enka in 1977 and Akzo Fibers in 1988. During the 1970s revenue from fiber was reduced from 50% to 30%, but Akzo was barely profitable. Akzo sold its US fiber business to BASF in 1985 to obtain funds for purchase of various small companies, mostly American, making chemicals, coatings and pharmaceuticals. Akzo merged with the Swedish Nobel Group in 1996 to form what is now AkzoNobel in a complex process in which parts of the companies were divested or shut down, and a major reorganization was implemented.

In 1998 Akzo-Nobel bought Courtaulds. The fiber divisions of the two companies were combined, and in 1999 spun off as a new company named Acordis Industrial Fibers. On 3 April 2001 Acordis closed its rayon plant in Mobile, Alabama. The CEO noted that rayon consumption was steadily declining in the US due to growing imports of yarns, fabrics and finished garments, and had dropped from 390 million pounds in 1990 to around 190 million pounds in 2000. In 2002 the former Enka Glanzstoff operations became independent of Acordis, operating as Cordenka GmbH with headquarters in Obernburg. Cordenka continued to expand in Germany and Poland over the following years.

== Sources ==
- Abelshauser, Werner; Hippel, Wolfgang von; Johnson, Jeffrey Allan; Stokes, Raymond G. (2003-11-10). German Industry and Global Enterprise: BASF: The History of a Company. Cambridge University Press. ISBN 978-1-139-43875-9.
- Cassis, Youssef (1997-06-26). Big Business : The European Experience in the Twentieth Century: The European Experience in the Twentieth Century. Oxford University Press, UK. p. 255. ISBN 978-0-19-152179-9.
- Chandler, Alfred Dupont (2009-06-30). Shaping the Industrial Century: The Remarkable Story of the Evolution of the Modern Chemical and Pharmaceutical Industries. Harvard University Press. ISBN 978-0-674-02937-8.
- Chandler, Alfred D.; Amatori, Franco; Hikino, Takashi (1997). Big Business and the Wealth of Nations. Cambridge University Press. ISBN 978-0-521-66347-2.
- Chandler, Alfred Dupont; Hikino, Takashi (2009-06-30). Scale and Scope: The Dynamics of Industrial Capitalism. Harvard University Press. ISBN 978-0-674-02938-5.
- Daspit, Tom (2015). "The story of American Enka". Southern Railfan.
- Doidge-Harrison, Dick (2001-04-03). "Acordis to Close Rayon Plant". American Fiber Manufacturers Association / Fiber Economics Bureau.
- Donzé, Pierre-Yves; Nishimura, Shigehiro (2013-11-12). Organizing Global Technology Flows: Institutions, Actors, and Processes. Routledge. ISBN 978-1-135-01357-8.
- "Ernst Hellmut Vits". Internationales Biographisches Archiv. Munzinger. 1970-03-16.
- "Glanzstoff-Courtaulds GmbH". Das Lebensgeschichtliche Netz (in German).
- "History and Milestones". CORDENKA GmbH.
- "Ir. Th.SGJM (Steef) van Schaik". Parliamentary Documentation Centre (PDC) (in Dutch). Leiden University.
- James, Harold (2004-09-13). The Nazi Dictatorship and the Deutsche Bank. Cambridge University Press. ISBN 978-0-521-83874-0.
- Kaufman, Bruce E. (2014-07-31). The Development of Human Resource Management Across Nations: Unity and Diversity. Edward Elgar Publishing. ISBN 978-0-85793-299-0.
- Kipping, Matthias; Kudo, Akira; Schröter, Harm G. (2004-07-31). German and Japanese Business in the Boom Years. Routledge. ISBN 978-1-134-44139-6.
- Kleinschmidt, Christian (2002-09-11). "An Americanised Company in Germany: The Vereinigte Glanzstoff Fabriken AG in the 1950s". The Americanisation of European Business. Routledge. ISBN 978-1-134-69373-3.
- Levy, Hermann (1966). Industrial Germany: A Study of Its Monopoly Organisations and Their Control by the State. Psychology Press. ISBN 978-0-7146-1336-9.
- Melosh, Barbara (2012-08-06). Gender and American History Since 1890. Routledge. ISBN 978-1-134-90177-7.
- Seifert, Kurt (2015). "Von Glanzstoff zu ICO" (in German). Heimat- und Verkehrsverein, Obernburg am Main.
- Tedesco, Marie (2002). "North American Rayon Corporation and American Bemberg Corporation". Tennessee Encyclopedia of History and Culture. Nashville, Tennessee: Tennessee Historical Society.
- Wilkins, Mira (2009-06-30). The History of Foreign Investment in the United States, 1914–1945. Harvard University Press. ISBN 978-0-674-04518-7.
- "Wiskord SA Szczecin" (in Polish). Gremi Biznes Communication. 1996-05-27.
- "Wiskord zlikwidowany" (in Polish). Gremi Biznes Communication. 2000-07-18.
- Woodings, C (2001-04-30). Regenerated Cellulose Fibres. Elsevier. ISBN 978-1-85573-758-7.
