= Tetraamminecopper(II) sulfate =

Tetraamminecopper(II) sulfate monohydrate
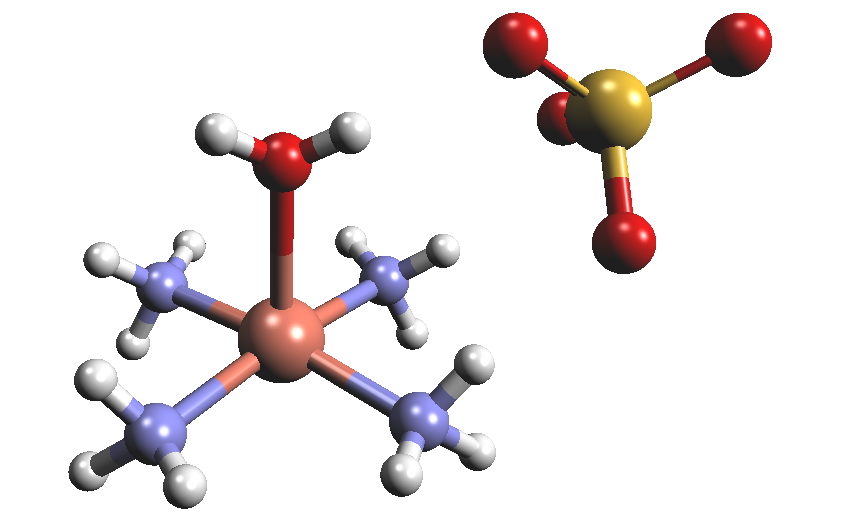
- Ball-and-stick model of the Tetramine copper(II) cation Tetraamminecopper(II) sulfate monohydrate Copper, Cu Oxygen, O Nitrogen, N Sulfur, S Hydrogen, H

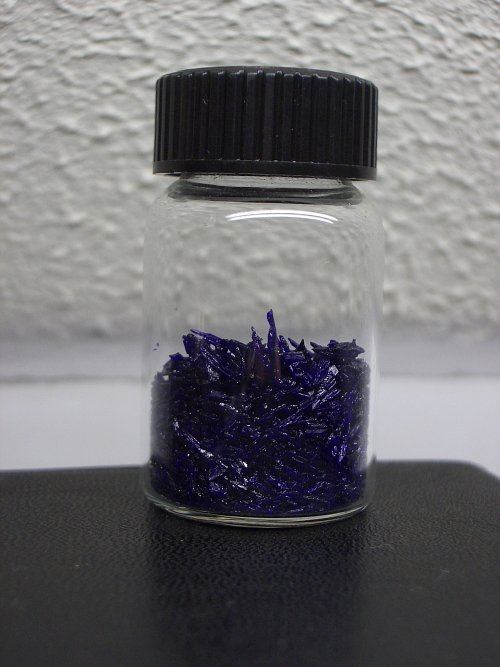
- Tetraamminecopper(II) sulfate monohydrate crystals

Names
- IUPAC name Tetraammineaquacopper(II) sulfate
- Other names: Cuprammonium(II) sulfate; Cuprammonium(II) sulfate monohydrate; Cupric sulfate, ammoniated; Tetraamminecopper(II) sulfate monohydrate

Identifiers
CAS Number	14283-05-7
3D model (JSmol)	Interactive image
ChemSpider	55433
ECHA InfoCard	100.155.305
EC Number	626-953-8
PubChem CID	61513
UNII	YMW7182547
CompTox Dashboard (EPA)	DTXSID70908605
- InChI: InChI=1S/Cu.4H3N.H2O4S.H2O/c;;;;;1-5(2,3)4;/h;4*1H3;(H2,1,2,3,4);1H2/q+2;;;;;;/p-2 Key: ABAHXVHZPFQSDZ-UHFFFAOYSA-L
- SMILES: [OH2+][Cu-3]([NH3+])([NH3+])([NH3+])[NH3+].[O-][S+2]([O-])([O-])[O-]

Properties
Chemical formula	[Cu(NH_{3})_{4}(H_{2}O)]SO_{4}
Molar mass	245.79 g/mol (monohydrate)
Appearance	dark blue-purple solution or crystals
Odor	Ammonia
Density	1.81 g/cm^{3}
Boiling point	330 °C (626 °F; 603 K)
Solubility in water	18.5 g/(100 g) (21.5 °C)

Hazards
- GHS labelling
Pictograms	(GHS07: Exclamation mark)
Signal word	Warning
Hazard statements	H315, H319, H335
Precautionary statements	P261, P264, P264+P265, P271, P280, P302+P352, P304+P340, P305+P351+P338, P319, P321, P332+P317, P337+P317, P362+P364, P403+P233, P405, P501
- Except where otherwise noted, data are given for materials in their standard state (at 25 °C [77 °F], 100 kPa). verify (what is ?) Infobox references

Tetraamminecopper(II) sulfate monohydrate, or more precisely tetraammineaquacopper(II) sulfate, is the salt with the formula [Cu(NH_{3})_{4}]SO_{4}·H_{2}O, or more precisely [Cu(NH_{3})_{4}(H_{2}O)]SO_{4}. This dark blue to purple solid is a sulfuric acid salt of the metal complex [Cu(NH_{3})_{4}(H_{2}O)]^{2+} (tetraammineaquacopper(II) cation). It is closely related to Schweizer's reagent, which is used for the production of cellulose fibers in the production of rayon.

== Properties ==
The deep blue crystalline solid tends to hydrolyse and evolve (release) ammonia upon standing in air. It is fairly soluble in water. The brilliant dark blue-violet color of tetraamminecopper(II) sulfate solution is due to the presence of [Cu(NH_{3})_{4}]^{2+} (tetraamminecopper(II) cation).

=== Corrosion ===
The characteristic deep blue colour of the tetraammine complex is found in brass and copper alloys where attack from ammonia has occurred, leading to cracking. The problem was first found in ammunition cartridge cases when they were stored near animal waste, which produced trace amounts of ammonia. This type of corrosion is known as season cracking.

== Structure ==
The solid state structure of tetraamminecopper(II) sulfate monohydrate confirms that the compound is a salt. The complex cation is [Cu(NH_{3})_{4}(H_{2}O)]^{2+} (tetraammineaquacopper(II) cation), which has a square pyramidal molecular geometry. The Cu-N and Cu-O bond length are about 210 and 233 pm, respectively, as determined by X-ray crystallography. The correct concentrations of ammonia and copper(II) sulfate solution needed to synthesize the complex can be determined by colorimetry. The combination of the correct concentrations will produce the highest absorbance read out on the colorimeter and as a result the formula of the complex can be verified.

== Synthesis ==
This compound can be prepared by adding concentrated aqueous solution of ammonia to a saturated aqueous solution of copper(II) sulfate pentahydrate followed by precipitation of the product with ethanol or isopropanol.

4 NH_{3} + CuSO_{4}·5H_{2}O → [Cu(NH_{3})_{4}(H_{2}O)]SO_{4} + 4 H_{2}O

== Uses ==
The dark blue-violet color is used as a positive test to verify the presence of Cu^{2+} in a solution.

== Gallery ==
Tetraaminecopper(II) compounds
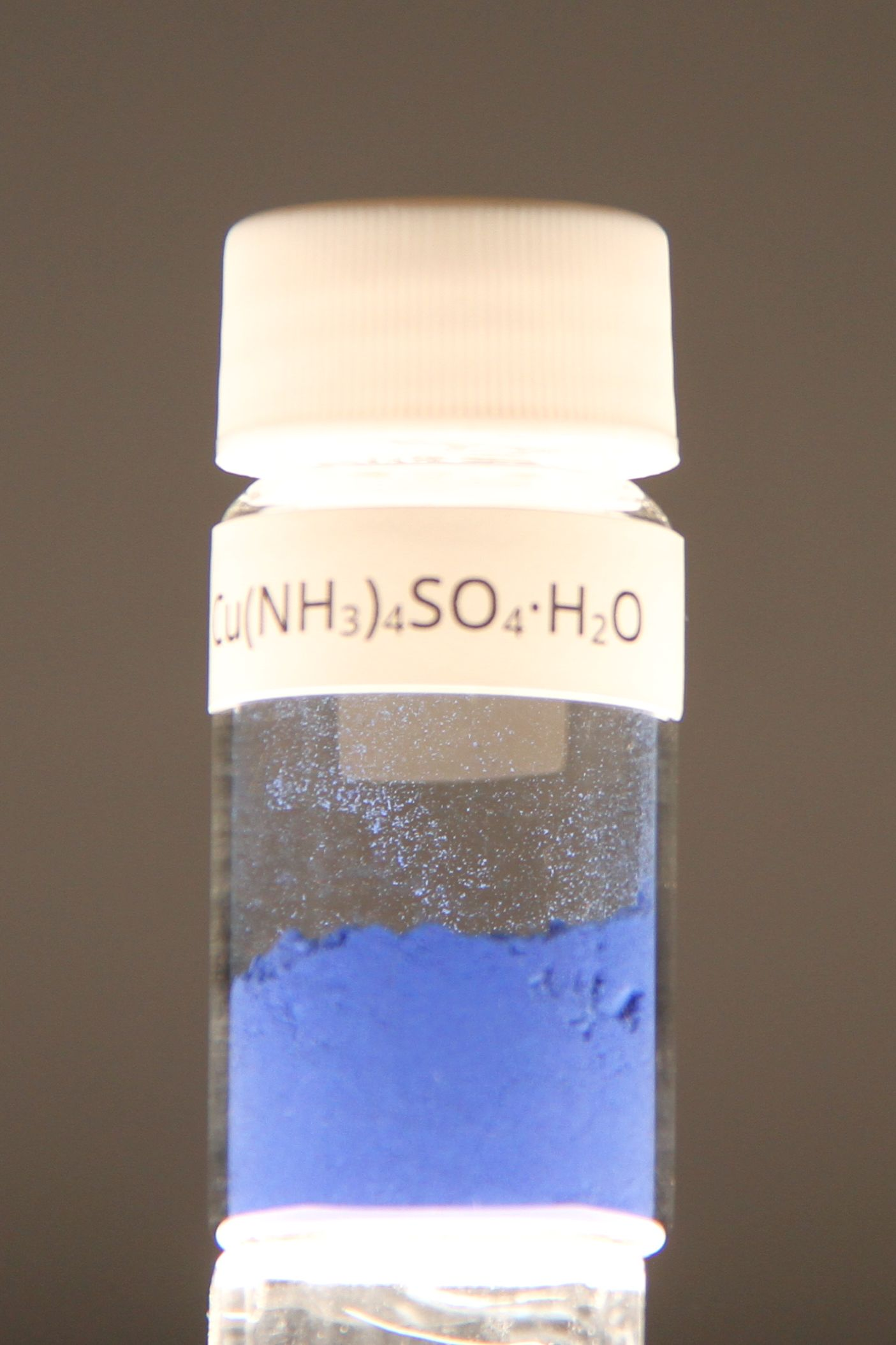
Tetraaminecopper(II) sulfate monohydrate milled

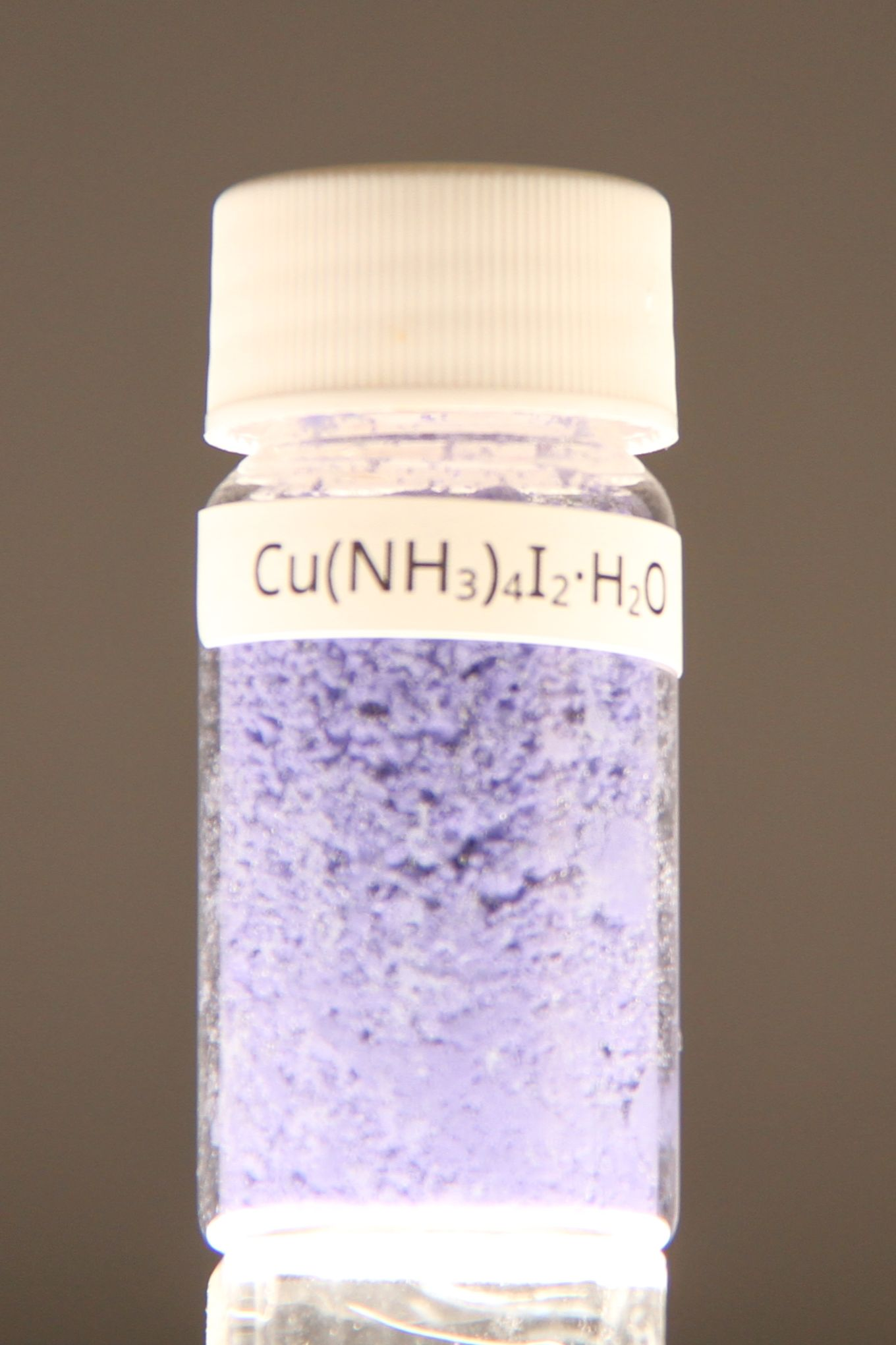
Tetraamminecopper(II) iodide monohydrate
