= Oberbruch Industry Park =

Coordinates: 51.058168°N 6.143299°E

Oberbruch Industry Park (German: Industriepark Oberbruch), is a former 110-hectare (270-acre) site of Akzo Nobel in Heinsberg, seat of Germany's westernmost district, near the Dutch border. It was founded in 1891 as a location for fiber industries. It is the birthplace of the German rayon and man-made fiber industry. Today, it is a diversified multi-user site, hosting companies from fields of industry such as high-performance fibers and energy technologies as well as from industrial biotechnology. Oberbruch Industry Park is the competency center for carbon (fiber) technology in North Rhine-Westphalia (NRW). Since 2000, the industry park has been operated by the Dutch energy company Nuon, the first independent industrial park operator not to come from the chemical industry. Since January 7, 2009 N.V. Nuon Energy has been part of Vattenfall.

== Rayon and man-made fibre industry ==
=== Rheinische Glühlampenfabrik Dr. Max Fremery & Co ===
Today's Oberbruch Industry Park was founded as "Rheinische Glühlampenfabrik Dr. Max Fremery & Co“. In 1891, Max Fremery, a chemist from Cologne and Johann Urban, an engineer from Austria, chose a former paper mill as their base. They intended to search for a filament that offered high efficiency in production and energy consumption and a longer life.

In 1892, the two were successful in producing filaments in substantial quantities by precipitating cellulose from solution in cuprammonium hydroxide (copper(II) oxide dissolved in aqueous ammonia/sodium hydroxide). At first, the cuprammonium rayon was used as incandescent filament in light bulb production. An improved process refined the first rough and uneven filament to increase its strength and elasticity. This would enable the spinning of a material that compared to silk. In 1897, Fremery and Urban applied for a patent for their method. In the history of the textile industry, the so-called "Pauly Patent" is considered as the beginning of German rayon production. Although bulb production was discontinued in 1902, rayon production advanced on an industrial scale.

=== Vereinigte Glanzstoff-Fabriken AG ===
In 1899 Vereinigte Glanzstoff-Fabriken AG with headquarters in Elberfeld was founded. Eventually the Bergische trimming and braiding industry with its "Barmer Articles" became the most important buyer of Oberbruch rayon. As early as 1900, a hall accommodating 18 spinning machines opened. For the first time, a joint spinning vessel was set up in a nearby room and from there the material was pressed to the individual spinning frames and further to numerous capillary tubes. This formed the foundation of the continuous spinning process still used today. The inventor was Eduard Boos, engineer and Fremery's son-in-law.

Despite the economic success of cuprammonium rayon (tenfold increase of annual production, sixfold increase of turnover, fivefold increase of manpower by 1912), the future belonged to the viscose process invented in England. In 1911, Glanzstoff acquired the viscose patent which advanced to production line status in Oberbruch. The original cuprammonium rayon was completely withdrawn in 1916. During the First World War Oberbruch was the only Glanzstoff plant to continue production at a limited level despite declining demand and a lack of labour.

A lack of raw material forced the rayon industry to take new steps. Staple fiber as replacement for cotton was the new product, waste threads of man-made continuously spinnable filaments cut to staple length. In 1916, the first staple filament spinning machine was put into operation. It was developed by Emil Bronnert, a chemist and Eduard Boos, an engineer.

This positive development did not last long. The Great Depression hit the Glanzstoff particularly hard. Declining demand led to extensive dismissals. At the peak of the crisis in 1932, the company had a workforce of 2,200 employees compared to 6,300 in 1925.

The only innovation was the introduction of perforated aluminium rollers enabling the production of even bigger weaves. This was the last expansion for many years. The strategic economic planning of the National Socialist Government prohibited investments and company expansions in borderline regions.

The Oberbruch plant became a research and development facility for the Glanzstoff Group. In 1935, the first tests for the production of rayon for tyres and driving belts were performed. A pilot plant for continuous spinning, washing and drying of viscose silk began in 1937, while a process for the recovery of carbon disulphide in the rayon staple plant was developed.

During World War II Glanzstoff Oberbruch went through its most difficult years. Until September 1944 the factory continued to operate without severe disruptions. On September 19, the 45th anniversary of the works, all machines had to be stopped. Oberbruch was now on the front line.

In February 1947 Allied forces allowed production to resume. At the end of 1948, Glanzstoff's workforce had grown to 3,400. In December 1951, the first machine for continuous viscose spinning was set up to replace the glass-roller spinning process. In 1953, the last glass-roller spinning machine was turned off.

=== Perlon ===
Apart from textile and technical rayon ("Cordenka“), which due to its raw material was considered a natural fiber, Oberbruch entered the world of fully synthetic fibers and introduced Perlon (polyamide, PA6). The fast-growing synthesis division changed the structure of the plant. Old departments closed. 1958 saw the start of Diolen (polyethylene terephthalate, PET) spinning which gradually replaced Perlon. PET became the main product at the site. Perlon was discontinued in 1971.

=== Steel cord ===
At the beginning of the 1960s, the first tests for the manufacture of steel cord were undertaken. The company wanted to include tyre reinforcement material in its product range. A large-scale production was established in Oberbruch in 1969 which Akzo ceased again in 1991 for reason of international competition and establishment of tyre manufacturers' own capacities. In the second half of the 1960s, the number of employees reached a peak of 7,088. Glanzstoff remained a world leader in the production of man made fibers and their basic products up to the 1970s.

=== PET ===
Investment at the beginning of the 1970s focused on modernization and streamlining. This was the only way the increasingly brisk competition could be countered. The group's management decided that the Oberbruch site should pioneer this modernization, since it had gained strategic importance with the textile polyester yarn PET. With an annual production of more than 43,000 tons it became the biggest polyester filament plant of the Group. Innovative spinning techniques now included high-speed melt spinning and spin-stretching. Advancing polyester condensation was another target. However, the oil crisis of 1973-1974 damaged the investment program. Only 4 high-speed melt spinning machines were installed.

=== Crisis ===
The unprecedented crisis in man-made fiber production shook the industry in the mid 70s. Part-time work, downsizing, limited output, investment cut-back and restructuring were the consequences. The first steps towards the establishment of an industrial park were taken. In 1978, "Spinneret Center Oberbruch“ changed into "Enka tecnica“. The product range included spinnerets, components and testing equipment for the man-made fiber, textile and plastics industry.

=== 1980s ===
On September 13, 1985, the foundation stone of the state-of-the-art PEt spinning mill was laid. This enabled Oberbruch to become the largest and most efficient European producer of polyester filament. In 1986, Oberbruch was again pacemaker of the latest technical innovation. The production of high-performance carbon (fiber) Tenax started. In 1983, Enka AG, a company of the Akzo Group signed a license agreement for the production of carbon fiber with Toho Rayon Co. Ltd., Tokyo. Since 1986, carbon fibers with an initial capacity of 360 tons per annum have been produced in Oberbruch. 1990 marked the operational start of the research facility. In 1993, Akzo Nobel Faser AG includes the carbon fiber activities in a joint venture with the licensor Toho Rayon Co. Ltd. Toho Tenax Fibers GmbH & Co. KG is established. Today, Toho Tenax Europe GmbH, a subsidiary of Teijin, Japan, boasts production with 4 lines at the Oberbruch site and was market leader in Europe.

=== 1990s ===
On June 30, 1993, Cordenka production was discontinued due to worldwide over-capacity. As Oberbruch was the smallest Cordenka site within the group, it was closed. The workforce decreased to well below 2,000 employees, the former technical equipment and installation division and the central workshops of the former Akzo Nobel site were outsourced in 1993 and re-established as Hima, today BIS Maintenance Südwest GmbH. The former Group parent Akzo Nobel parted completely with the man-made fiber division while the site's diverse business units became autonomous enterprises. As independent companies, they looked for new partners, initiating the change from a homogenous firm to an open industrial park.

Since 1998 the site has operated as Oberbruch Industry Park. Industriepark Oberbruch GmbH & Co. KG, (IPO), was at that time the service provider for the enterprises located there. Administration and marketing of the entire infrastructure and expansion were the main tasks and objectives of IPO, which had its origin in the service departments of the former Akzo Nobel site. The services to date include supplies, disposal, quality, security, environmental protection, logistics, personnel, project and real estate management.

=== Twenty-first century ===
As Akzo Nobel/Accordis' last operative business unit at the site a new owner was needed as service provider. They decided in favour of an independent operator outside the chemical industry. The Dutch energy company Nuon took over the site in 2000. In 01/07/2009 N.V. Nuon Energy with headquarters in Amsterdam became part of Vattenfall AB. In Germany, Nuon operates Oberbruch Industry Parkand Niederau Industry Park in Düren, in the Netherlands De Kleef Industry Park in Arnhem and EMMTEC Industry & Business Park in Emmen.

Oberbruch Industry Park hosts some 20 companies in the fields of processing chemistry, plastics and new materials with approximately 2,000 employees. It is operated by NUON Energie und Service GmbH, a wholly owned subsidiary of N.V. Nuon Energy.

== Infrastructure ==
The Park boasts an infrastructure oriented to chemical production.

=== Energy supply ===
In 2006 a gas and steam turbine power plant (CHP plant) opened, featuring a thermal capacity of 40 MW, a waste heat boiler with 20 MW, a gas turbine generator with 14 MW and a back-pressure steam turbine with 7 MW. Fuels include natural gas, technical gas such as compressed air, oxygen and nitrogen. Water is provided as drinking water, desalinated water, cooling water. Refrigerants such as cooling brine and ammonia complete the range.

=== Waste management ===
In 1978 a chemical-biological wastewater treatment plant opened on the site cleaning the site's entire industrial water, waste water and surface water. The plant is sized to handle about 150,000 inhabitants, and runs at approximately 50% of capacity.

=== Site logistics ===
Logistics services include incoming and outgoing goods control, stock-holding for raw material, consumables, primary products and finished goods. The Park has its own rail connection.

== Companies ==
Teijin Carbon Europe GmbH (formerly Toho Tenax Europe GmbH until 2018) manufactures carbon fiber. Teijin Carbon Europe is Europe's largest carbon fiber manufacturer, producing around 5,100 tons of carbon fiber a year on four lines.

In 2006 Australian Ceramic Fuel Cells Ltd settled at the site. The worldwide first production of solid oxide fuel cells for coupled power heat generation was established at Oberbruch Industry Park.

Since 2009, GNT Europe GmbH has produced colors from renewable raw material. GNT develops and produces high-tech products from edible fruits, vegetables and plants.

Since 2007, SAXID GmbH has produced brake linings.

BIS Maintenance Südwest GmbH, is a leading provider of industrial services with focus on process industry and energy management.

Alliander AG became a grid operator via separation from the energy production sector of n.v. Nuon in 2008. Since 1 July 2009 the company as focused on the operation and modernization of electricity and gas grids.

Lekker Energie GmbH originated from Nuon Deutschland GmbHas. As part of the Enervie Group since 1/1/2010. The European Commission imposed the sale of Nuon Deutschland in 2009 on Vattenfall as a condition of the acquisition of the Dutch parent company N.V. Nuon Energy (formerly n.v. Nuon).

Essedea texolutions produces three-dimensional textiles.

E&K has produced printed circuit boards since 1995.

Meckling CNC-Präzisionsbearbeitung has been active at the park since 1994 in producing CNC lathing and CNC cutting workpieces.

PolymerOberbruch GmbH, formerly Kuag's Polykondensation, is owned by Indian Group Zoom Developers (P) Ltd., Bombay. It produced matted chips and plans the production of "brilliant" and "supra-brilliant" chips, for medical applications, chips on heavy-metal-free catalysis basis and for foils as well as flame-retardant chips and chips for the production of PET bottles.

Atos Origin provides IT services.

NUON Energie und Service GmbH, is the operating company of the park.

Prospex is a workshop for mentally handicapped people to develop craft skills in the realistic environment of a workshop.

BKK Euregio was founded in 1896 as a health insurance fund for employees of Max Fremery & Co. and Vereinigte Glanzstoff-Fabriken.

== Literature ==
Industriepark Oberbruch GmbH & Co.KG (Ed.): Industriepark Oberbruch - ein Standort wird 100. Heinsberg 1999.

Industrievereinigung Chemiefaser E.V., Druckhaus Tempelhof, Berlin, o.J.: Du und die Chemiefasern

Vereinigte Glanzstoff-Fabriken AG, Wuppertal-Elberfeld, o.J.: Diolen Polyesterfaser - Entwicklung und Möglichkeiten

Robert Bauer; Das Jahrhundert der Chemiefasern, Goldmann Gelbe Taschenbücher, München, 1958

Werner Meyer-Larsen: Chemiefasern, Rowohlt Taschenbuch Verlag GmbH, Reinbeck bei Hamburg, Januar 1972
