= Max Fremery =

German chemist and entrepreneur (1859–1932)

- Fremery in 1906
- Born: 29 March 1859; Cologne, Kingdom of Prussia
- Died: 1 March 1932 (aged 72); Baden-Baden, Germany
- Occupations: Chemist; industrialist
- Known for: Founder of Vereinigte Glanzstoff-Fabriken (VGF)

Max Fremery (29 March 1859 – 1 March 1932) was a German chemist and industrialist. He was one of the founders of the Vereinigte Glanzstoff-Fabriken (VGF) in 1899. VGF became a major manufacturer of artificial fibers.

== Early years (1859–85) ==
Fremery was born in Cologne on 29 March 1859. His parents were Christian Fremery (1816–63), a wine and textile merchant, and Julie Vinman (1816–89). He worked in the workshops of the Rhenish Railway Company (Rheinische Eisenbahn-Gesellschaft) in Cologne, and then in the blast furnace and steelworks of Hörder Vereins.

He studied chemistry, graduating in Freiburg im Breisgau, then worked as a chemist, including working in England for a period. In 1883 he was employed with the Electriciteits Maatschappij in Rotterdam in developing a light filament. In the mid-1880s Fremery and the Austrian engineer Johann Urban (1863–1940), whom he had met in Amsterdam, took over the technical management of a light bulb factory in Gelnhausen.

In 1885 Fremery married Margarete Alder. She died in 1892, and in 1897 he married Clara Lürmann (1871–1924), daughter of a Swedish industrialist.

== Lamp manufacture (1885–1900) ==
The Swiss chemist Matthias Eduard Schweizer (1818–60) had found in 1857 that cotton could be dissolved in a solution of copper salts and ammonia and then regenerated. In 1890 the French chemist Louis Henri Despeissis invented the cuprammonium process for spinning fibers from cotton dissolved in Schweizer's reagent. Despeissis died in 1892 and his patent was not renewed. In 1891 Fremery and Urban adapted the Despaissis process to make electric lamp filaments from carbon fiber. In 1892 they founded an incandescent electric lamp manufacturing company, Rheinische Glühlampenfabrik in Oberbruch, in the Heinsberg district. The Solingen merchant Hermann Heuser and Fremery's family subscribed the initial capital of 300,000 marks. Fremery and Urban manufactured their lamp filaments using cotton and Schweizer's reagent.

After two years Rheinische Glühlampenfabrik production had reached acceptable volumes, and from 1894 the company was delivering lamps to France in significant quantities. In 1895 the factory employed 36 men and 46 women, and was producing about 400,000 lamps per year. That year the factory was operating night and day to meet demand, mostly from England and Russia. Although prices were low, the company was profitable due to low wages and the use of water power. By 1900 the company had 350 employees, and still had low production costs. However, it was struggling to remain profitable in the face of the low prices of the major electrical manufacturers.

== Rayon manufacture (1898–1912) ==
The success of the cellulose fiber developed by Hilaire de Chardonnet encouraged Fremery and Urban to investigate making artificial silk, which they named "Silkimit". Fremery and Urban became involved in developing synthetic fiber (Glanzstoff) in the mid-1890s. Their process soon proved much safer than Chardonnet's nitrocellulose, which was prone to explosions and fires, although it was still complex and costly in comparison to the viscose process patented in 1892 in England.

The company had developed a process by 1897 that used rotating cylinders to stretch the fibers into finer filaments that could be used for making clothes. They patented a version of the Despeissis process with the addition of a practical method for spinning the fiber. They filed the patent under the name of Dr. Hermann Pauly (1870–1950) (Note: Dr. Hermann Pauly of the Mönchengladbach technical school let his name be used on the patent for the VGF cuprammonium process, but was not further involved in development of the product.) so as not to alert their competitors. The patent was challenged but was upheld. In Oberbruch in 1898 they established the first factory in Germany to economically produce artificial fiber, using a patent for manufacture of rayon made from cellulose in a copper-ammonia solution. The workforce had grown to 700 people within one year. In 1899 enterprises in France and Austria were licensed to produce rayon using the Fremery-Urban method.

Fremery and Urban moved their headquarters to Elberfeld, now a suburb of Wuppertal. Vereinigte Glanzstoff-Fabriken (VGF) was launched on 19 September 1899 with 2 million marks of capital, the Bergisch-Märkischen bank providing the financing. Fremery and the lawyer Hans Jordan (died 1923) were the main organizers. Fremery and Urban, with the Alsatian textile chemist David Emil Bronnert (1868–1928), took out two more basic patents in 1900.

Although VGF's product was less versatile than rayon produced by the viscose process the scale of the operation allowed for reduced prices. Based largely on Fremery's leadership, the company quickly became a leader in artificial fiber manufacturing. In 1911 VGF bought the Henckel von Donnersmarckschen Kunstseide- und Acetatwerke rayon factor in Stettin, and acquired the patent rights for viscose manufacture. The company headed by Count Guido Henckel von Donnersmarck (1830–1916) had been the first in Germany to use the viscose process invented by Courtaulds in Britain. VGF quickly expanded viscose production.

== Last years (1912–32) ==
In 1912 Fremery resigned from VGF board for health reasons. He died in Baden-Baden on 3 January 1932.

== Sources ==
- Beau, Horst (1961). "Fremery, Max". Neue Deutsche Biographie (in German). Vol. 5.
- Chandler, Alfred Dupont; Hikino, Takashi (2009-06-30). Scale and Scope: The Dynamics of Industrial Capitalism. Harvard University Press. ISBN 978-0-674-02938-5.
- Heerding, A. (1988). The History of N. V. Philips' Gloeilampenfabrieken: Volume 2, A Company of Many Parts. CUP Archive. ISBN 978-0-521-32170-9.
- Kleinschmidt, Christian (2002-09-11). "An Americanised Company in Germany: The Vereinigte Glanzstoff Fabriken AG in the 1950s". The Americanisation of European Business. Routledge. ISBN 978-1-134-69373-3.
- Morgan, Peter (2005-05-20). Carbon Fibers and Their Composites. CRC Press. ISBN 978-1-4200-2874-4.
- Woodings, C (2001-04-30). Regenerated Cellulose Fibres. Elsevier. ISBN 978-1-85573-758-7.
