= Matthias Eduard Schweizer =

Swiss chemist and inventor (1818–1860)

- Born: 8 August 1818; Wila, Canton of Zürich, Switzerland
- Died: 23 October 1860 (aged 42); Zürich, Switzerland
- Occupation: Chemist
- Known for: Schweizer's reagent

Matthias Eduard Schweizer (8 August 1818 – 23 October 1860) was a Swiss chemist who in 1857 invented Schweizer's reagent, in which cellulose can be dissolved to produce artificial silk or rayon. He was one of the pioneers of the synthetic textile industry.

== Life ==
Matthias Eduard Schweizer was born on 8 August 1818 in Wila, Zurich canton. He was awarded his doctorate in at the University of Zurich, then worked as an assistant at the Zurich Polytechnic. He was a student and assistant of Carl Jacob Löwig, and was mainly involved in analysis of different minerals. He lectured at the university, and was an associate professor at the university from 1852. From 1855 he taught chemistry at the Higher Industrial School (Oberen Industrieschule) in Zurich. Schweizer published a paper in 1857 (Das Kupferoxid-Ammoniak, ein Auflösungsmittel für die Pflanzenfaser) in which he reported that cotton, linen cellulose and silk could be dissolved in a cuprammonium solution. He found that after extrusion the cellulose could be regenerated in a coagulating bath. Schweizer did not apply for a patent on his invention. He died on 23 October 1860 in Zurich at the age of 42.

== Schweizer's reagent ==
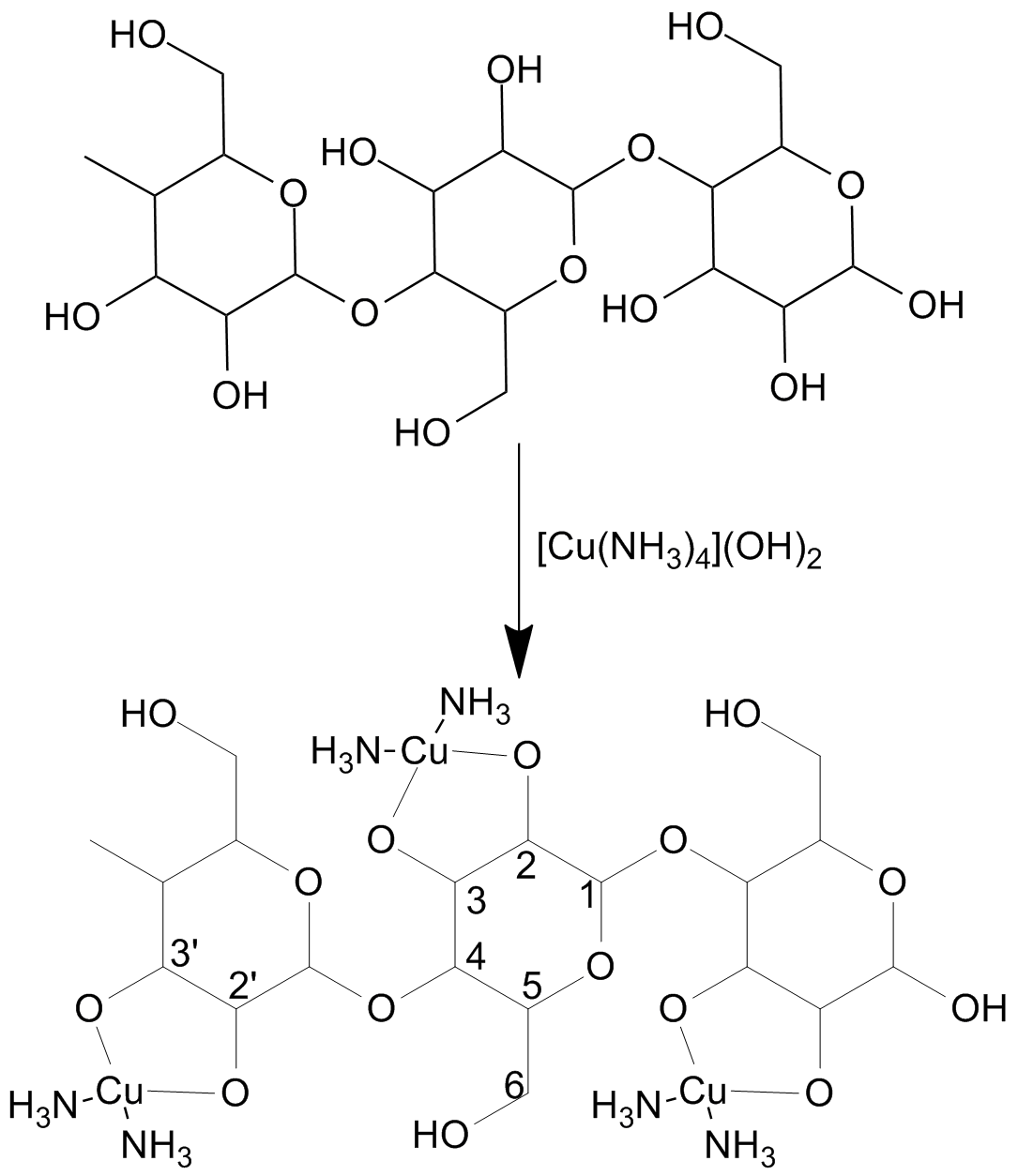
Cellulose dissolution in tetraaminecopper(II) hydroxide

Schweizer's reagent is an alkaline solution of copper sulfate in ammonia, [Cu(NH_{3})_{4}] (OH)_{2}–3H_{2}O, or CuH_{14}N_{4}O_{2}. Schweizer's reagent may be prepared by covering technical grade, stabilized Copper(II) hydroxide with ammonium hydroxide. It was the basis for the process patented in 1890 by the French chemist Louis-Henri Despeissis for making fibers from cuprammonium rayon. He extruded the cuprammonium solution of cellulose into water, then used dilute sulfuric acid to neutralize the ammonia and precipitate the cellulose fibers. Despeissis died in 1892 and his patent was not renewed.

== Industrial exploitation ==
Max Fremery (1859–1932), a German chemist, and Johann Urban (1863–1940), an Austrian engineer, began manufacturing lamp filaments in Oberbruch near Aachen in 1891 using cotton and Schweizer's reagent. They patented a version of the Despeissis process with the addition of a practical method for spinning the fiber. On 19 September 1899 they launched Vereinigte Glanzstoff-Fabriken (VGF) with 2 million marks of capital. VGF quickly became a successful artificial fiber manufacturing company.

By 1909–10 it was evident that the viscose process was superior, and VGF began to convert to viscose production. However, although cuprammonium rayon was more expensive than viscose rayon, with Edmund Thiele's "stretch-spinning" process it was possible to make rayon with fine filaments of 1-1.5 denier. Cuprophan, a cellulose membrane based on the process, was being used in dialyzers after World War II (1939–45). As late as 2001 Asahi Chemical Industries of Nobeoka, Japan, was using the cuprammonium process to manufacture rayon.

== Sources ==
- Curley, Robert (2009-12-20). The Britannica Guide to Inventions That Changed the Modern World. The Rosen Publishing Group. ISBN 978-1-61530-020-4.
- Horner, W. Elliott; Alexander, S. A.; Julian, Maureen M. (March–April 1986). "Qualitative Determination of Cellulose in the Cell Walls of Verticicladiella procera". Mycologia. 78 (2): 300–303. doi:10.2307/3793179. JSTOR 3793179.
- Ing, Todd S.; Rahman, Mohamed A.; Kjellstrand, Carl M. (2012). Dialysis: History, Development, and Promise. World Scientific. ISBN 978-981-4289-75-7.
- Kauffman, George B. (December 1984). "Eduard Schweizer (1818-1860): The unknown chemist and his well-known reagent". J. Chem. Educ. 61 (12): 1095. Bibcode:1984JChEd..61.1095K. doi:10.1021/ed061p1095.
- Senning, Alexander (2006-10-30). Elsevier's Dictionary of Chemoetymology: The Whys and Whences of Chemical Nomenclature and Terminology. Elsevier. ISBN 978-0-08-048881-3.
- Woodings, C (2001-04-30). Regenerated Cellulose Fibres. Elsevier. ISBN 978-1-85573-758-7.
