= Rayon =

Cellulose-based semi-synthetic fiber

Rayon is made by dissolving cellulose and then precipitating it into a fiber. One method is shown here using a blue solution of cellulose (cuprammonium hydroxide used to dissolve) and colorless sulfuric acid to precipitate. The blue color fades from the fiber over time.

Rayon, also called viscose, is a semi-synthetic fiber made from natural sources of regenerated cellulose, such as wood and related agricultural products. It has the same molecular structure as cellulose. Many types and grades of rayon fibers and films exist. Some imitate the feel and texture of natural fibers such as silk, wool, cotton, and linen. It can be woven or knitted to make textiles for clothing and other purposes. Rayon production involves solubilizing cellulose fibers. Three common methods are as follows:

- The cuprammonium process (obsolete), using ammoniacal solutions of copper salts
- The viscose process (most common) using alkali and carbon disulfide
- The Lyocell process, using amine oxide, avoids neurotoxic carbon disulfide but is more expensive

== History ==
French scientist and industrialist Hilaire de Chardonnet (1838–1924) is known as the "father of rayon" for his early development and commercialization of nitrocellulose rayon, the first commercial semi-synthetic fiber. He patented his production process in 1885. Rayon was and still is also known by the name artificial silk.

Swiss chemist Matthias Eduard Schweizer (1818–1860) discovered that cellulose dissolved in tetraamminecopper dihydroxide. Max Fremery and Johann Urban developed a method to produce carbon fibers for use in light bulbs in 1897. Improvement of cuprammonium rayon for textiles by J. P. Bemberg in 1904 made the artificial silk a product comparable to real silk.

English chemist Charles Frederick Cross and his collaborators, Edward John Bevan and Clayton Beadle, patented their artificial silk in 1894. They named it "viscose" because its production involved the intermediacy of a highly viscous solution. Cross and Bevan took out British Patent No. 8,700, "Improvements in Dissolving Cellulose and Allied Compounds" in May, 1892. In 1893, they formed the Viscose Syndicate to grant licences and, in 1896, formed the British Viscoid Co. Ltd.

The first commercial viscose rayon was produced by the UK company Courtaulds Fibres in November 1905. Courtaulds formed an American division, American Viscose (later known as Avtex Fibers), to produce their formulation in the US in 1910. For the next decade, American Viscose was the sole producer of rayon in the United States.

By the 1920s, the United States was the largest producer of rayon in the world. By 1929, the US output of rayon was more than double that of Italy, the second largest producer. There were half a dozen US rayon companies, but American Viscose produced more than half of the total rayon output in the US.

Manufacturers' search for a less environmentally-harmful process for making rayon led to the development of the Lyocell method for producing rayon. The Lyocell process was under development in the late 1970s by a team at the now defunct American Enka fibers facility near Asheville, North Carolina, with a landmark patent granted in 1979 to employees Neal E. Franks and Julianna K. Varga. In recognition of this work, the American Association of Textile Chemists and Colorists (AATCC) awarded Neal E. Franks their 2003 Henry E. Millson Award for the Invention for Lyocell. In 1966–1968, D. L. Johnson of Eastman Kodak Inc. studied NMMO solutions. In the decade 1969 to 1979, American Enka tried unsuccessfully to commercialize the process. The operating name for the fibre inside the Enka organization was "Newcell", and the development was carried through pilot plant scale before the work was stopped. The basic process of dissolving cellulose in NMMO was first described in a 1981 patent by Clarence McCorsley III for Akzona Incorporated (the holding company of Akzo). In the 1980s the patent was licensed by Akzo to Courtaulds and Lenzing. The fibre was developed by Courtaulds Fibers under the brand name "Tencel" in the 1980s. In 1982, a 100 kg/week pilot plant was built in Coventry, UK, and production was increased tenfold (to a ton/week) in 1984. In 1988, a 25 ton/week semi-commercial production line opened at the Grimsby, UK, pilot plant. The process was commercialized at Courtaulds' rayon factories at Mobile, Alabama. In January 1993, the Mobile Tencel plant reached full production levels of 20,000 tons per year, by which time Courtaulds had spent £100 million and 10 years on Tencel development. Tencel revenues for 1993 were estimated as likely to be £50 million. A second plant in Mobile was planned. By 2004, production had quadrupled to 80,000 tons.

Lenzing began a pilot plant in 1990, and commercial production in 1997, with 12 metric tonnes per year made in a plant in Heiligenkreuz im Lafnitztal, Austria. When an explosion hit the plant in 2003 it was producing 20,000 tonnes/year, and planning to double capacity by the end of the year. In 2004 Lenzing was producing 40,000 tons [sic, probably metric tonnes]. In 1998, Lenzing and Courtaulds reached a patent dispute settlement.

In 1998 Courtaulds was acquired by competitor Akzo Nobel, which combined the Tencel division with other fibre divisions under the Accordis banner, then sold them to private equity firm CVC Partners. In 2000, CVC sold the Tencel division to Lenzing AG, which combined it with their "Lenzing Lyocell" business, but maintained the brand name Tencel. It took over the plants in Mobile and Grimsby, and by 2015 were the largest lyocell producer at 130,000 tonnes/year.

== Process ==
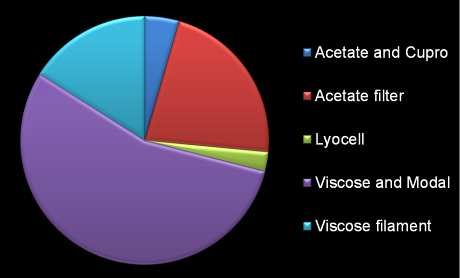
Cellulosic fibre production (total of 2.76 million tonnes) in 2002

Rayon is produced by dissolving cellulose, then converting this solution back to insoluble fibrous cellulose. Various processes have been developed for this regeneration. The current industrial methods for creating rayon are the cuprammonium method, the viscose method, and the Lyocell process. The cuprammonium and viscose methods have been practiced for more than a century with the viscose method contributing most of production.

=== Bernigaut's method (1884) ===
The first rayon was made by Louis Marie Hilaire Bernigaut in 1884. Bernigaut's rayon was made of nitrocellulose produced from cellulose, where the cellulose was obtained from cotton and then reacted with a mixture of sulfuric and nitric acid. Nitration occurs as:

[C_{6}H_{7}O_{2}(OH)_{3}]_{n} + HNO_{3} ↔ [C_{6}H_{7}O_{2}(NO_{3})_{3}]_{n} +H_{2}O.

The sulfuric acid is used take up the water formed in the reaction, leaving nitrocellulose. The nitrocellulose was highly flammable and it took seven years of further development before Bernigaut brought the product to market. The nitrocellulose process had been fully superseded for industrial production of rayon by the cuprammonium and viscose methods by the early 20th century.

=== Cuprammonium method (1890) ===
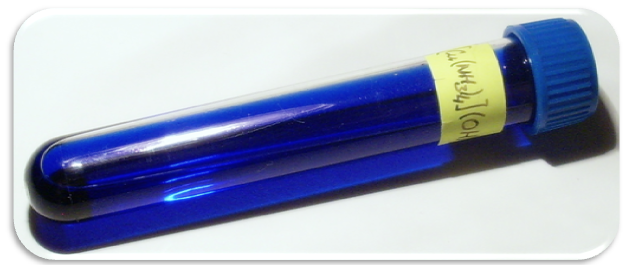
Aqueous solution of Schweizer's reagent or cuoxam

Cuprammonium rayon has properties similar to rayon made using the more prevalent viscose method; however, during its production, the cellulose is combined with copper and ammonia (Schweizer's reagent). Due to the detrimental environmental effects of this production method, cuprammonium rayon is no longer being produced in the United States. The process has been described as obsolete, but cuprammonium rayon is still made by one company in Japan (as of Oct 2025).

Tetraamminecopper(II) sulfate is also used as a solvent.

=== Viscose method (1891) ===
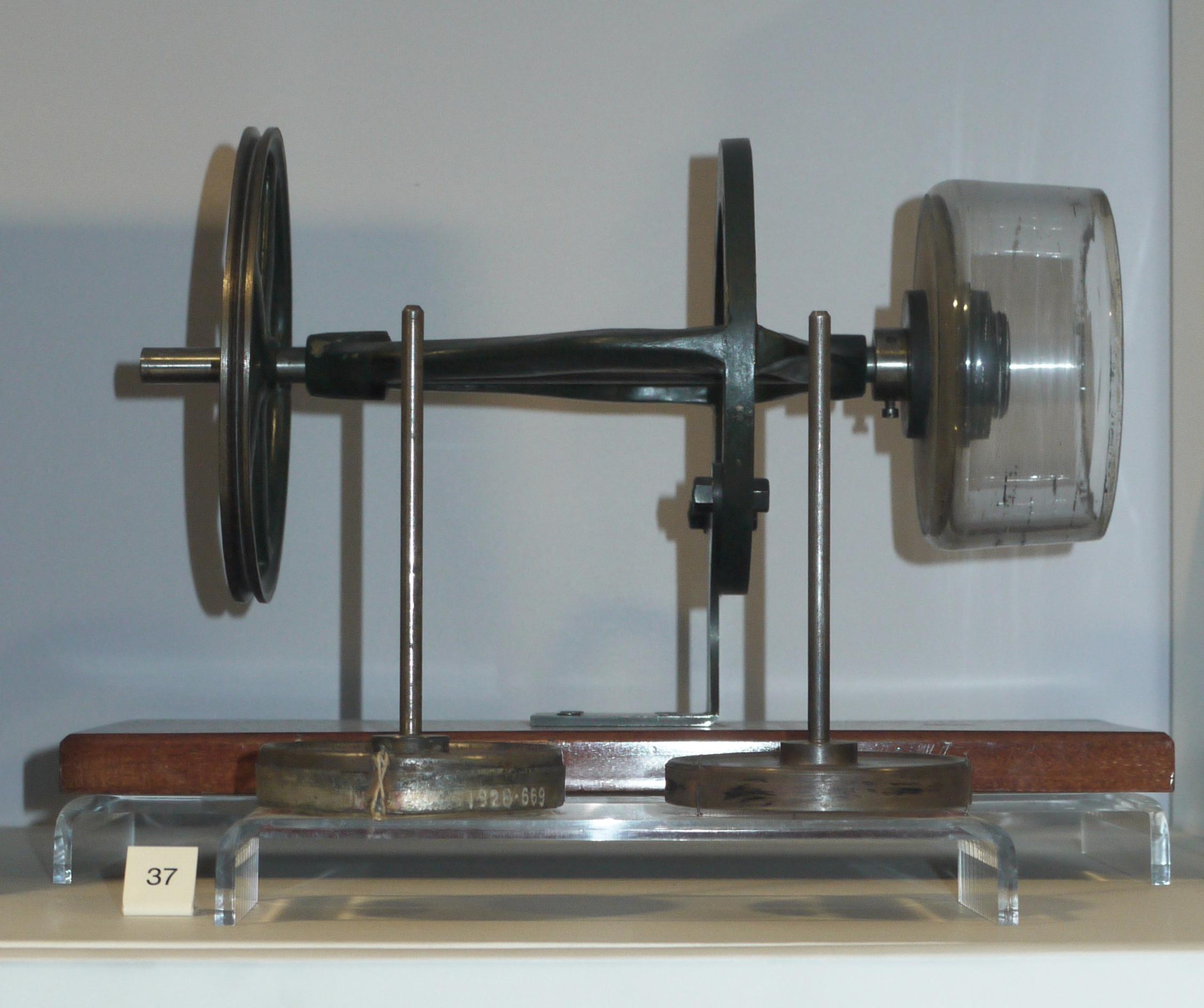
A device for spinning viscose rayon dating from 1901

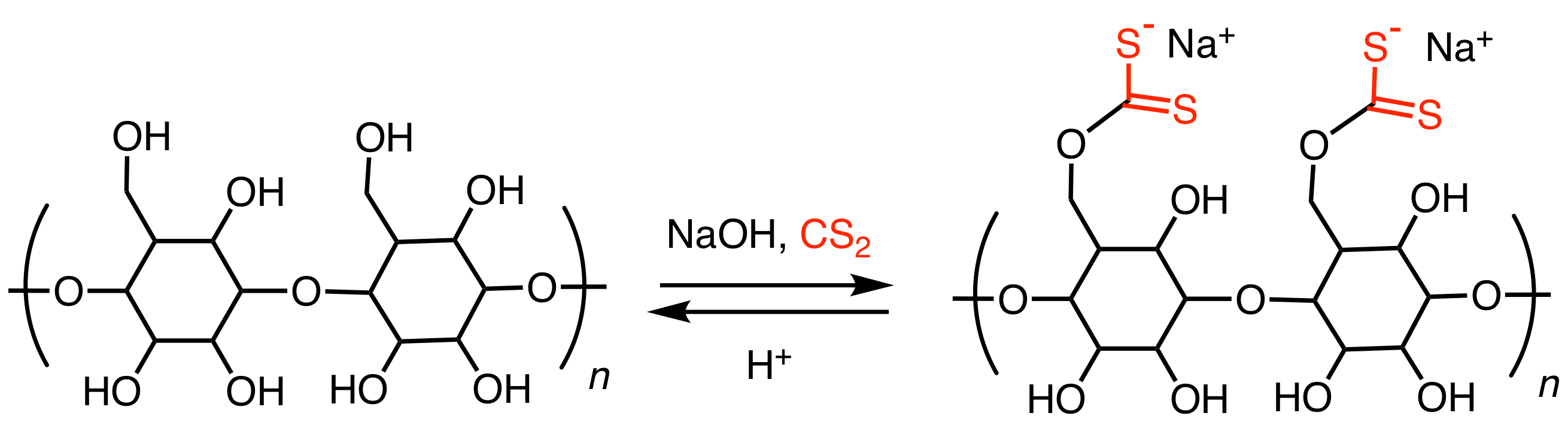
Simplified view of the xanthation of cellulose

The viscose process builds on the reaction of cellulose with a strong base, followed by treatment of that solution with carbon disulfide to give a xanthate derivative. The xanthate is then converted back to a cellulose fiber in a subsequent step.

The viscose method can use wood as a source of cellulose, whereas other routes to rayon require lignin-free cellulose as a starting material. The use of woody sources of cellulose makes the viscose process cheaper, so it was traditionally used on a larger scale than the other methods. On the other hand, the original viscose process generates large amounts of contaminated wastewater. Newer technologies use less water and have improved the quality of the wastewater.

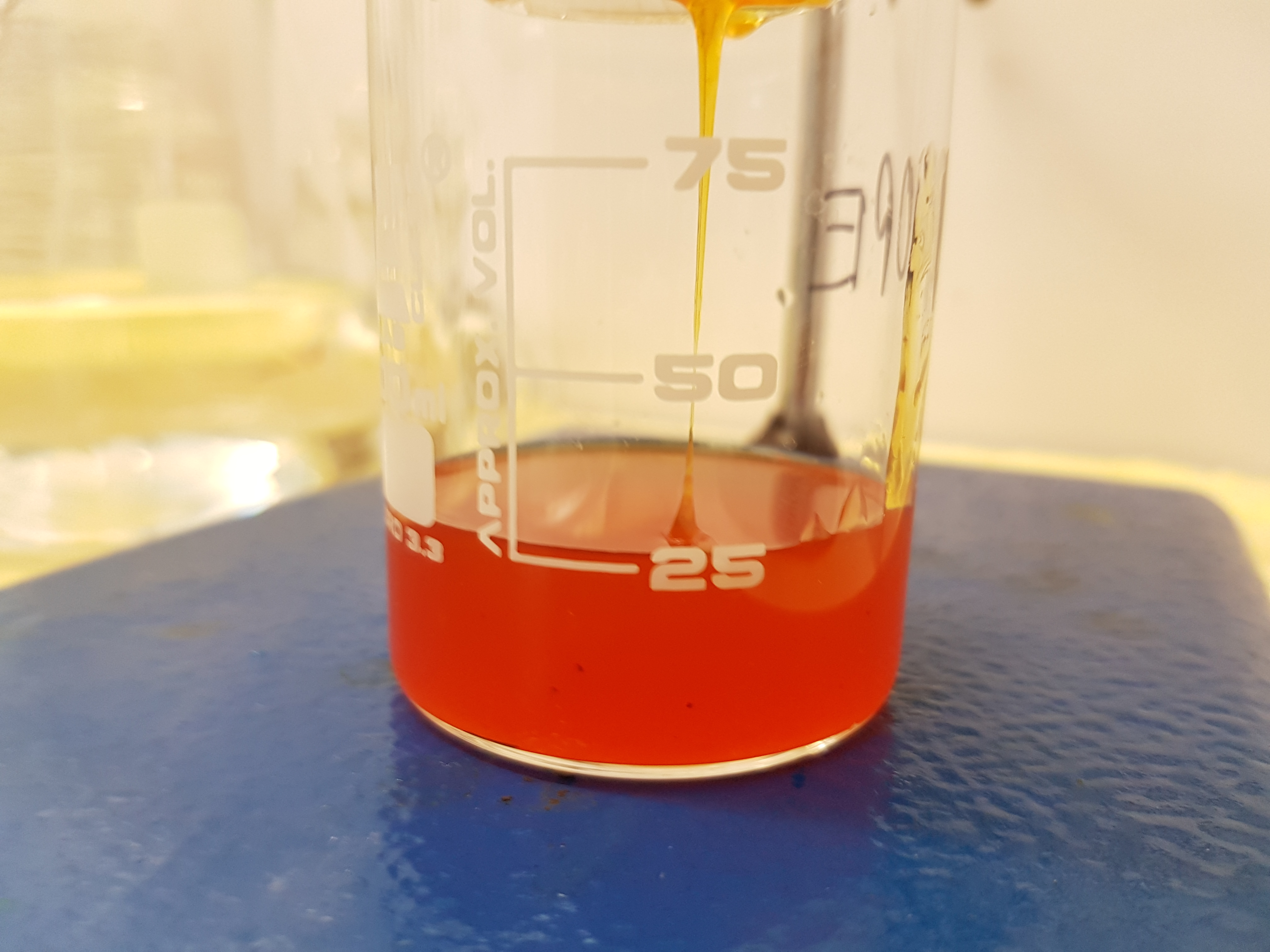
A viscous solution of cellulose xanthate dissolved in aqueous sodium hydroxide solution referred to as "viscose dope", prior to regeneration of the cellulose fibers

The raw material for viscose is primarily wood pulp (sometimes bamboo pulp), which is chemically converted into a soluble compound. It is then dissolved and forced through a spinneret to produce filaments, which are chemically solidified, resulting in fibers of nearly pure cellulose. Unless the chemicals are handled carefully, workers can be seriously harmed by the carbon disulfide used to manufacture most rayon.

To prepare viscose, pulp is treated with aqueous sodium hydroxide (typically 16–19% by mass) to form alkali cellulose, which has the approximate formula [C_{6}H_{9}O_{4}−ONa]_{n}. This material is allowed to depolymerize to an extent. The rate of depolymerization (ripening or maturing) depends on temperature and is affected by the presence of various inorganic additives, such as metal oxides and hydroxides. Air also affects the ripening process, since oxygen causes depolymerization. The alkali cellulose is then treated with carbon disulfide to form sodium cellulose xanthate:

[C_{6}H_{5}(OH)_{4}−ONa]_{n} + nCS_{2} → [C_{6}H_{5}(OH)_{4}−OCS_{2}Na]_{n}

Rayon fiber is produced from the ripened solutions by treatment with a mineral acid, such as sulfuric acid. In this step, the xanthate groups are hydrolyzed to regenerate cellulose and carbon disulfide:

[C_{6}H_{5}(OH)_{4}−OCS_{2}Na]_{2n} + nH_{2}SO_{4} → [C_{6}H_{5}(OH)_{4}−OH]_{2n} + 2nCS_{2} + nNa_{2}SO_{4}

Aside from regenerated cellulose, acidification gives hydrogen sulfide (H_{2}S), sulfur, and carbon disulfide. The thread made from the regenerated cellulose is washed to remove residual acid. The sulfur is then removed by the addition of sodium sulfide solution, and impurities are oxidized by bleaching with sodium hypochlorite solution or hydrogen peroxide solution.

Production begins with processed cellulose obtained from wood pulp and plant fibers. The cellulose content in the pulp should be around 87–97%.

The steps:

1. Immersion: The cellulose is treated with caustic soda.
2. Pressing. The treated cellulose is then pressed between rollers to remove excess liquid.
3. The pressed sheets are crumbled or shredded to produce what is known as "white crumb".
4. The "white crumb" is aged through exposure to oxygen. This is a depolymerization step and is avoided in the case of polynosics.
5. The aged "white crumb" is mixed in vats with carbon disulfide to form the xanthate. This step produces "orange-yellow crumb".
6. The "yellow crumb" is dissolved in a caustic solution to form viscose. The viscose is set to stand for a period of time, allowing it to "ripen". During this stage the molecular weight of the polymer changes.
7. After ripening, the viscose is filtered, degassed, and then extruded through a spinneret into a bath of sulfuric acid, resulting in the formation of rayon filaments. The acid is used as a regenerating agent. It converts cellulose xanthate back to cellulose. The regeneration step is rapid, which does not allow proper orientation of cellulose molecules. So to delay the process of regeneration, zinc sulfate is used in the bath, which converts cellulose xanthate to zinc cellulose xanthate, thus providing time for proper orientation to take place before regeneration.
8. Spinning. The spinning of viscose rayon fiber is done using a wet-spinning process. The filaments are allowed to pass through a coagulation bath after extrusion from the spinneret holes.
9. Drawing. The rayon filaments are stretched, in a procedure known as drawing, to straighten out the fibers.
10. Washing. The fibers are then washed to remove any residual chemicals from them.
11. Cutting. If filament fibers are desired, then the process ends here. The filaments are cut down when producing staple fibers.

=== Lyocell method (1982) ===
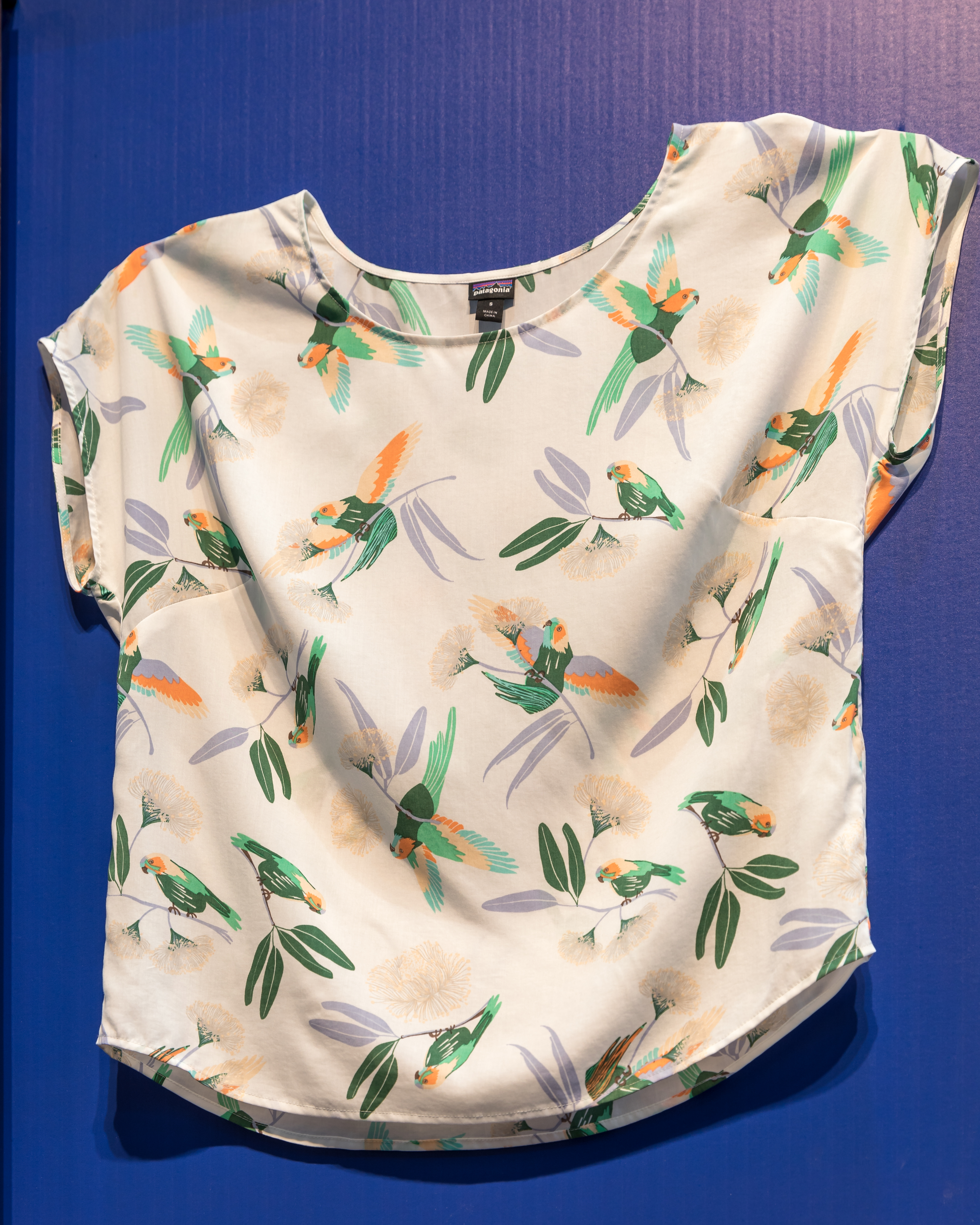
Lyocell shirt

The Lyocell process relies on dissolution of cellulose products in a solvent, N-methyl morpholine N-oxide (NMMO). The dissolved cellulose is then subject to dry-jet wet spinning.

Early development took place in the 1970s at the now defunct American Enka Company and at Courtaulds Fibres, with Courtaulds in 1982 establishing a pilot plant to produce 100 kg/week of rayon by the Lyocell method. Lenzing's Tencel is an example of a Lyocell fiber. Unlike the viscose process, the lycocell process does not use highly toxic carbon disulfide. "Lyocell" has become a genericized trademark, used to refer to the Lyocell process for making cellulose fibers.

As of 2018, the Lyocell process is not widely used, because it is still more expensive than the viscose process.

== Properties ==
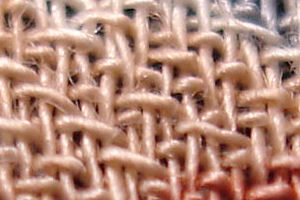
A close-up of rayon from a skirt

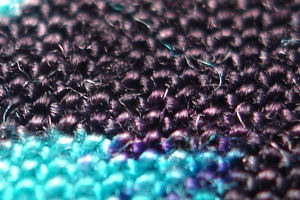
Another skirt with a different texture

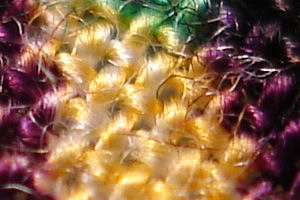
A blouse with a texture similar to the second

Rayon is a versatile fiber and is widely claimed to have the same comfort properties as natural fibers, although the drape and slipperiness of rayon textiles are often more like nylon. It can imitate the feel and texture of silk, wool, cotton, and linen. The fibers are easily dyed in a wide range of colors. Rayon fabrics are soft, smooth, cool, comfortable, and highly absorbent, but they do not always insulate body heat, making them ideal for use in hot and humid climates, although also making their hand feel cool and sometimes almost oily to the touch.

The durability and appearance retention of regular viscose rayons are low, especially when wet; also, rayon has the lowest elastic recovery of any fiber. However, HWM rayon (high-wet-modulus rayon) is much stronger and exhibits higher durability and appearance retention. Recommended care for regular viscose rayon is dry-cleaning only. HWM rayon can be machine-washed.

Regular rayon has lengthwise lines called striations and its cross-section is an indented circular shape. The cross-sections of HWM and cupra rayon are rounder. Filament rayon yarns vary from 80 to 980 filaments per yarn and vary in size from 40 to 5000 denier. Staple fibers range from 1.5 to 15 denier and are mechanically or chemically crimped. Rayon fibers are naturally very bright, but the addition of delustering pigments cuts down on this natural brightness.

== Structurally-modified rayons ==
The physical properties of rayon remained unchanged until the development of high-tenacity rayon in the 1940s. Further research and development led to high-wet-modulus rayon (HWM rayon) in the 1950s, with U.S. production starting in 1955. Research in the UK was centred on the government-funded British Rayon Research Association.

=== High-tenacity rayon ===
High-tenacity rayon is another modified version of viscose rayon that has almost twice the strength of HWM. This type of rayon is typically used for industrial purposes such as tire cord.

Industrial applications of rayon emerged around 1935. Substituting cotton fiber in tires and belts, industrial types of rayon developed a totally different set of properties, amongst which tensile strength and elastic modulus were paramount.

=== Modal ===
Modal is a genericized trademark of Lenzing AG, used for (viscose) rayon which is stretched as it is made, aligning the molecules along the fibers. Two forms are available: "polynosics" and "high wet modulus" (HWM). High-wet-modulus rayon is a modified version of viscose that is stronger when wet. It can be mercerized like cotton. HWM rayons are also known as "polynosic". Polynosic fibers are dimensionally stable and do not shrink or get pulled out of shape when wet like many rayons. They are also wear-resistant and strong while maintaining a soft, silky feel. They are sometimes identified by the trade name Modal. Modal is used alone or with other fibers (often cotton or spandex) in clothing and household items like pajamas, underwear, bathrobes, towels, and bedsheets. Modal can be tumble-dried without damage. The fabric has been known to pill less than cotton due to fiber properties and lower surface friction. The trademarked Modal is made by spinning beech-tree cellulose and is considered a more eco-friendly alternative to cotton, as the production process uses on average 10–20 times less water.

== Producers and brand names ==
In 2018, viscose fiber production in the world was approximately 5.8 million tons, and China was the largest producer with about 65% of total global production. Trade names are used within the rayon industry to label the type of rayon in the product. Viscose rayon was first produced in Coventry, England in 1905 by Courtaulds.

Bemberg is a trade name for cuprammonium rayon developed by J. P. Bemberg. Bemberg performs much like viscose but has a smaller diameter and comes closest to silk in feel. Bemberg is now only produced in Japan. The fibers are finer than viscose rayon.

Modal and Tencel are widely used forms of rayon produced by Lenzing AG. Tencel, generic name Lyocell, is made by a slightly different solvent recovery process, and is considered a different fiber by the US Federal Trade Commission (FTC). Lyocell was first produced commercially by Courtaulds' Grimsby plant in England. The process, which dissolves cellulose without a chemical reaction, was developed by Courtaulds Research.

Birla Cellulose is also a volume manufacturer of rayon. They have plants located in India, Indonesia and China.

Accordis was a major manufacturer of cellulose-based fibers and yarns. Production facilities can be found throughout Europe, the U.S. and Brazil. (Note: Acordis was a spinoff by AkzoNobel in 2000 after it had acquired Courtaulds. It was through AkzoNobel's original parent company's, the Nederlandse Kunstzijdefabriek (ENKA), a joint venture with Rento Hofstede Crull's De Vijf, named De Internationale Spinpot Exploitatie Maatschappij (ISEM) that the commercial production of rayon was made viable. Hofstede Crull had supplied the solution for the problem of manufacturing rayon with his Driving Device for a Centrifugal Spinning Machine in 1925 (1931 U.S. patent 1,798,312). The ISEM was fully integrated with the Algemene Kunstzijde Unie, the Nederlandse Kunstzijdefabriek's successor, with the death of Hofstede Crull in 1938. (See AkzoNobel, American Enka Company, and also Rento Hofstede Crull.))

Visil rayon and HOPE FR are flame retardant forms of viscose that have silica embedded in the fiber during manufacturing.

North American Rayon Corporation of Tennessee produced viscose rayon until its closure in the year 2000. (Note: North American Rayon Corporation of Tennessee was an American subsidiary of J. P. Bemburg A.G. which was part of the Vereinigte Glanstoff Fabriken that were absorbed into the Dutch AKU, AkzoNobel today)

Indonesia is one of the largest producers of rayon in the world, and Asia Pacific Rayon (APR) of the country has an annual production capacity of 0.24 million tons.

== Environmental impact ==
The biodegradability of various fibers in soil burial and sewage sludge was evaluated by Korean researchers. Rayon was found to be more biodegradable than cotton, and cotton more than acetate. The more water-repellent the rayon-based fabric, the more slowly it will decompose. Subsequent experiments have shown that wood-based fibres, like Lyocell, readily biodegrade whereas synthetic fibers such as polyester do not biodegrade at all. Silverfish—like the firebrat—can eat rayon, but damage was found to be minor, potentially due to the heavy, slick texture of the tested rayon. Another study states that "artificial silk [...] [was] readily eaten" by the grey silverfish.

A 2014 ocean survey found that rayon contributed to 56.9% of the total fibers found in deep ocean areas, the rest being polyester, polyamides, acetate and acrylic. A 2016 study found a discrepancy in the ability to identify natural fibers in a marine environment via Fourier transform infrared spectroscopy. Later research of oceanic microfibers instead found cotton being the most frequent match (50% of all fibers), followed by other cellulosic fibers at 29.5% (e.g., rayon/viscose, linen, jute, kenaf, hemp, etc.). Further analysis of the specific contribution of rayon to ocean fibers was not performed due to the difficulty in distinguishing between natural and man-made cellulosic fibers using FTIR spectra.

For several years, there have been concerns about links between rayon manufacturers and deforestation. As a result of these concerns, FSC and PEFC came on the same platform with CanopyPlanet to focus on these issues. CanopyPlanet subsequently started publishing a yearly Hot Button report, which puts all the man-made cellulosics manufacturers globally on the same scoring platform. The scoring from the 2020 report scores all such manufacturers on a scale of 35, the highest scores having been achieved by Birla Cellulose (33) and Lenzing (30.5).

== Health issues ==
The most common rayon production method, the viscose process, uses carbon disulfide, which is highly toxic. It is well documented to have seriously harmed the health of rayon workers in developed countries, and emissions may also harm the health of people living near rayon plants and their livestock. Rates of disability in modern factories (mainly in China, Indonesia, and India) are unknown. This has raised ethical concerns over viscose rayon production. As of 2016, production facilities located in developing countries generally do not provide environmental or worker safety data.

Most global carbon disulfide emissions come from rayon production, as of 2008. But statistics on the damage were not compiled in the UK until the 1960s.As of 2004, about 250 g of carbon disulfide is emitted per kilogram of rayon produced.

Control technologies have enabled improved collection of carbon disulfide and reuse of it, resulting in a lower emissions of carbon disulfide. These have not always been implemented in places where it was not legally required and profitable.

Carbon disulfide is volatile and is lost before the rayon gets to the consumer; the rayon itself is basically pure cellulose.

Studies from the 1930s showed that 30% of American rayon workers experienced significant health impacts due to carbon disulfide exposure. Courtaulds worked hard to prevent this information being published in Britain.

During the Second World War, political prisoners in Nazi Germany were made to work in appalling conditions at the Phrix rayon factory in Krefeld. Nazis used forced labour to produce rayon across occupied Europe.

In the 1990s, viscose rayon producers faced lawsuits for negligent environmental pollution. Emissions abatement technologies had been consistently used. Carbon-bed recovery, for instance, which reduces emissions by about 90%, was used in Europe, but not in the US, by Courtaulds. Pollution control and worker safety started to become cost-limiting factors in production.

Japan has reduced carbon disulfide emissions per kilogram of viscose rayon produced (by about 16% per year), but in other rayon-producing countries, including China, emissions are uncontrolled. Rayon production is steady or decreasing except in China, where it is increasing, as of 2004.

Rayon production has largely moved to the developing world, especially China, Indonesia and India. Rates of disability in these factories are unknown, as of 2016, and concerns for worker safety continue.

== Related materials ==
Related materials are not regenerated cellulose, but esters of cellulose.

Nitrocellulose is a derivative of cellulose that is soluble in organic solvents. It is mainly used as an explosive or as a lacquer. Many early plastics, including celluloid, were made from nitrocellulose.

Cellulose acetate shares many traits with viscose rayon and was formerly considered the same textile. However, rayon resists heat, while acetate is prone to melting. Acetate must be laundered with care either by hand-washing or dry cleaning, and acetate garments disintegrate when heated in a tumble dryer. The two fabrics are now required to be listed distinctly on US garment labels.

Cellophane is generally made by the viscose process, but dried into sheets instead of being spun into fibers.

== See also ==
- Cellophane – Thin, transparent sheet made of cellulose
- Hilaire de Chardonnet – French engineer, inventor of artificial silk (1839–1924)
- Nitrocellulose – Highly flammable compound
- Neuroplastic effects of pollution – Effects of pollution on the brain
- Ray P. Dinsmore – Polymer scientist (1893–1979)
