= Steef van Schaik =

Dutch politician (1888-1968)

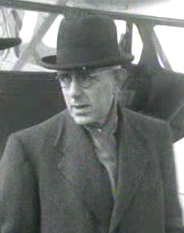
Steef van Schaik

Theodorus Stephanus Gerardus Johannes Marie (Steef) van Schaik (8 December 1888, in Druten – 10 September 1968, in Arnhem) was a Dutch politician.

Van Schaik was a Roman Catholic entrepreneur and government minister. He made a career at the Algemene Kunstzijde Unie in Arnhem. As a technocrat he became minister of Traffic and Energy in the Schermerhorn–Drees cabinet. Upon him fell the difficult task to repair the heavily destroyed infrastructure as well as the detrimental fuel supply of The Netherlands just after World War II. After 1948 he became chief executive of the Algemene Kunstzijde Unie.

Steef was a brother of the well-known Dutch politician Josef van Schaik.
