= Johann Urban =

- Born: 7 June 1863; Wuchern (Vuhred), Lower Styria.
- Died: 13 November 1940 (aged 77); Vienna, Austria
- Occupation: Engineer
- Known for: Co-founder of Vereinigte Glanzstoff-Fabriken

Johann Urban (or Johannes Urban, 7 June 1863 – 13 November 1940) was an Austrian chemist and industrialist. He was one of the pioneers of the artificial silk industry.

== Early years ==
Johann Urban was born on 7 June 1863 in Wuchern (now Vuhred) near Marburg (Maribor) in Lower Styria, Austrian Empire. His father was a timber merchant. He studied mechanical and electrical engineering in Graz, and expected to work as a teacher at a state vocational school. Instead, he found work in a light bulb factory in Rotterdam, where he met Max Fremery. In the mid-1880s Urban and Fremery took over the technical management of a light bulb factory in Gelnhausen.

== Lamp manufacture (1885–1900) ==
The Swiss chemist Matthias Eduard Schweizer (1818–60) had found in 1857 that cotton could be dissolved in a solution of copper salts and ammonia and then regenerated. In 1890 the French chemist Louis Henri Despeissis invented the cuprammonium process for spinning fibers from cotton dissolved in Schweizer's reagent. Despeissis died in 1892 and his patent was not renewed. In 1891 Fremery and Urban adapted the Despaissis process to make electric lamp filaments from carbon fiber. In 1892 they founded an incandescent electric lamp manufacturing company, Rheinische Glühlampenfabrik in Oberbruch, in the Heinsberg district. In 1895 the factory employed 36 men and 46 women, and was producing about 400,000 lamps per year. By 1900 the company had 350 employees, but was struggling to remain profitable in the face of the low prices of the major electrical manufacturers.

== Rayon manufacture (1898–1912) ==
Fremery and Urban became involved in developing synthetic fiber (Glanzstoff) in the mid-1890s. The success of the nitrocellulose fiber developed by Hilaire de Chardonnet encouraged Fremery and Urban to investigate making artificial silk, which they named "Silkimit" and patented in 1897. Their cuprammonium process was cheaper and safer than nitrocellulose. The company had developed a process by 1897 that used rotating cylinders to stretch the fibers into finer filaments that could be used for making clothes. They patented a version of the Despeissis process with the addition of a practical method for spinning the fiber. In Oberbruch in 1898 they established the first factory in Germany to economically produce artificial fiber, using a patent for manufacture of rayon made from cellulose in a copper-ammonia solution. The workforce had grown to 700 people within one year.

Fremery and Urban moved their headquarters to Elberfeld, now a suburb of Wuppertal. Vereinigte Glanzstoff-Fabriken (VGF) was launched on 19 September 1899 with 2 million marks of capital. The Bergisch-Märkischen bank provided the financing. Urban became the technical director of the newly founded VGF. Fremery and Urban, with the Alsatian textile chemist David Emil Bronnert (1868–1928), took out two more basic patents in 1900. From 1904 Urban was head of the Erste österreichische Glanzstoff-Fabriken (First Austrian Rayon Factory) in Sankt Pölten. This was a joint venture of several German and Austrian firms, led by VGF. It grew rapidly, and by 1913 employed about 1,700 people.

Johann Urban died on 13 November 1940 in Vienna.

== Sources ==
- Beau, Horst (1961). "Fremery, Max". Neue Deutsche Biographie (in German). Vol. 5.
- Fünfundzwanzig Jahre Erste Österreichische Glanzstoff-Fabrik A. G. St. Pölten. 1929.
- Büttner, Rudolf (1972). "St. Pöltens Gründerzeit (1901–1914)". St. Pölten als Standort industrieller und großgewerblicher Produktion seit 1850. Kapitel.
- Heerding, A. (1988). The History of N. V. Philips' Gloeilampenfabrieken: Volume 2, A Company of Many Parts. CUP Archive. ISBN 978-0-521-32170-9.
- Kleinschmidt, Christian (2002-09-11). "An Americanised Company in Germany: The Vereinigte Glanzstoff Fabriken AG in the 1950s". The Americanisation of European Business. Routledge. ISBN 978-1-134-69373-3.
- Matis, Herbert (1994). The Economic development of Austria since 1870. E. Elgar. ISBN 978-1-85278-719-6.
- Morgan, Peter (2005-05-20). Carbon Fibers and Their Composites. CRC Press. ISBN 978-1-4200-2874-4.
- Wieninger, Manfred (2002). "Urbanstraße". St. Pöltner Straßennamen erzählen. Loewenzahn. ISBN 3-7066-2208-4.
- Woodings, C (2001-04-30). Regenerated Cellulose Fibres. Elsevier. ISBN 978-1-85573-758-7.
