= Spinneret (disambiguation) =

Spinneret principally refers to the silk spinning organ on a spider, silk worm, or insect larvae.

Spinneret may also refer to:

- Spinneret (novel), a novel by Timothy Zahn
- Spinneret (polymers), a device used to extrude polymers into fibers (by analogy with a spider)
- Spinneret, a Marvel Comics character related to the High Evolutionary
- Spinneret, a web server board made by Parallax, Inc.

== See also ==
- Spinnerette, an alternative rock project
