= Schweizer's reagent =

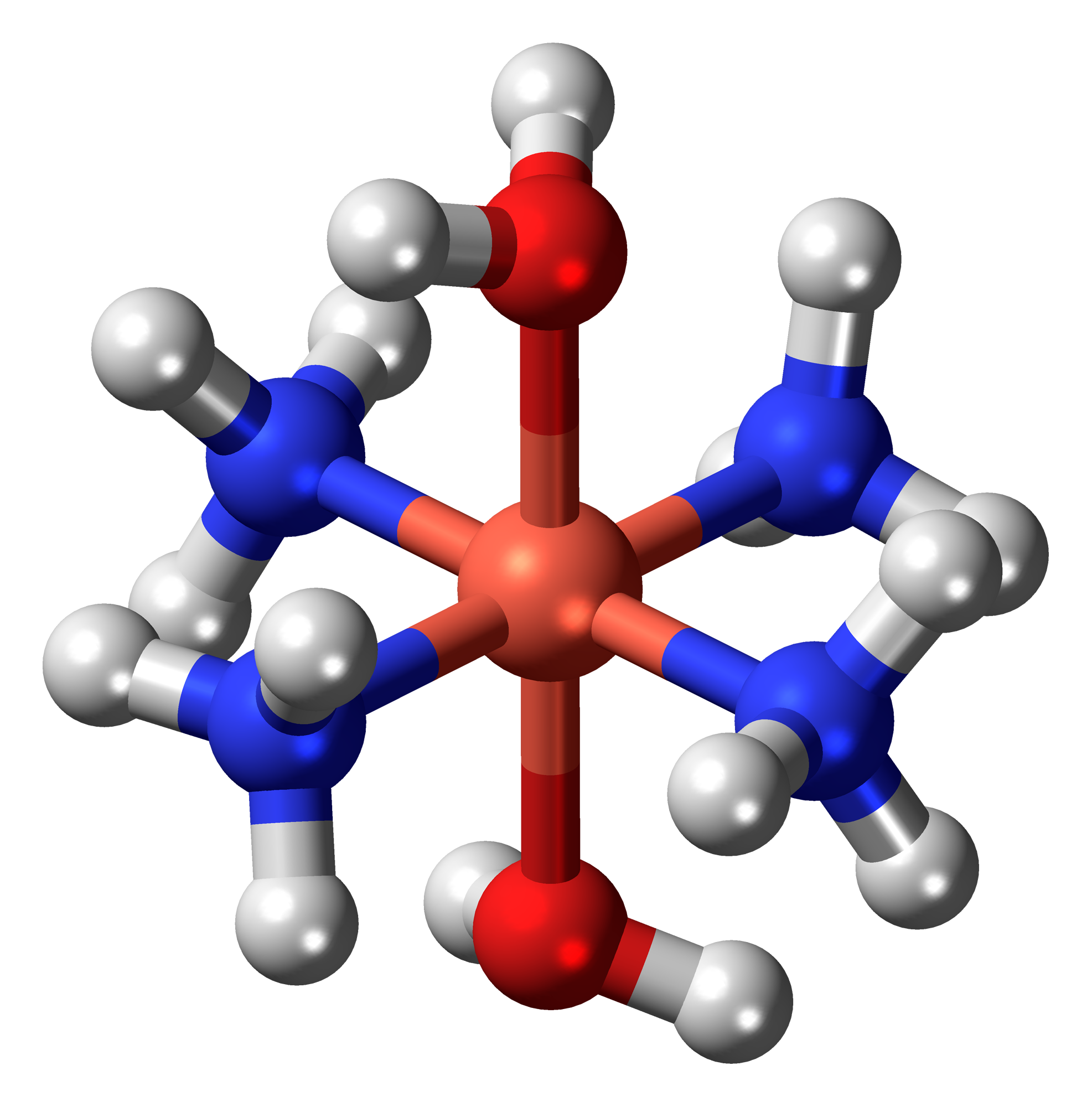
- Tetraamminediaquacopper(II) cation [Cu(NH_{3})_{4}(H_{2}O)_{2}]^{2+} Copper, Cu Oxygen, O Nitrogen, N Hydrogen, H

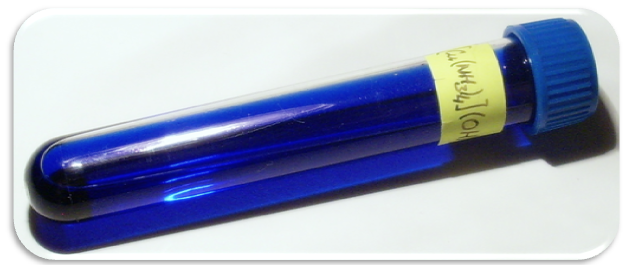
- Aqueous solution of Schweizer's reagent

Names
- IUPAC name Tetraamminediaquacopper(II) hydroxide
- Other names Cuoxam, Schweitzer's reagent

Identifiers
CAS Number	17500-49-1
3D model (JSmol)	Interactive image
ChemSpider	13684416
ECHA InfoCard	100.037.720
EC Number	241-508-4
PubChem CID	44152387
UNII	2GNV835EOI
- InChI: InChI=1S/Cu.4H3N.4H2O/h;4*1H3;4*1H2/q+2;;;;;;;;/p-2 Key: CFYZFEQXFCKMGE-UHFFFAOYSA-L
- SMILES: N.N.N.N.O.O.[Cu+2].[OH-].[OH-]

Properties
Chemical formula	[Cu(NH_{3})_{4}(H_{2}O)_{2}](OH)_{2}
Molar mass	201.714 g·mol^{−1}
Appearance	Deep-blue crystalline solid
Melting point	decomposes

Related compounds
Related compounds	Tetraamminecopper(II) sulfate
- Except where otherwise noted, data are given for materials in their standard state (at 25 °C [77 °F], 100 kPa). Infobox references

Schweizer's reagent is a metal ammine complex with the formula [Cu(NH_{3})_{4}(H_{2}O)_{2}](OH)_{2}. This deep-blue compound is used in purifying cellulose. It is a salt, consisting of tetraamminediaquacopper(II) cations ([Cu(NH_{3})_{4}(H_{2}O)_{2}]^{2+}) and hydroxide anions (OH^{−}).

It is prepared by dissolving copper(II) hydroxide in an aqueous solution of ammonia.

It forms an azure solution. Evaporation of these solutions leaves light blue residue of copper hydroxide, reflecting the lability of the copper-ammonia bonding. If conducted under a stream of ammonia, then deep blue needle-like crystals of the tetrammine form. In presence of oxygen, concentrated solutions give rise to nitrites Cu(NO_{2})_{2}(NH_{3})_{n}. The nitrite results from oxidation of the ammonia.

== Reactions with cellulose ==
Schweizer's reagent was once used in production of cellulose products such as rayon and cellophane (see cupro). Cellulose, which is quite insoluble in water (hence its utility as clothing), dissolves in the presence of Schweizer's reagent. Using the reagent, cellulose can be extracted from wood pulp, cotton fiber, and other natural cellulose sources. Cellulose precipitates when the solution is acidified. It functions by binding to vicinal diols.

Presently, the reagent is used in the analysis of the molecular weight of cellulose samples.

== History ==
These properties of Schweizer's reagent were discovered by the Swiss chemist Matthias Eduard Schweizer (1818–1860), after whom the reagent is named. The French chemist Louis-Henri Despeissis then proposed a procedure where cellulose is extruded into diluted sulphuric acid. This leads to the complex no longer being stable enough to hold the cellulose in solution and it precipitates out forming strings. These strings were later used in industry to make artificial silk which was called rayon in the US and viscose in the UK. It was also originally used to make cellophane.
