= Tim Heldt =

German YouTuber

Tim Heldt (alias KuchenTV) is a German commercial influencer. His content is self-reflective and addresses topics from the German-language social media and gaming scene. A large portion of his content revolves around conflicts, scandals, and missteps involving other German influencers and streamers. Occasionally, he also touches upon social and political issues and commented these from a conservative and right wing populist opinion.

According to estimates by observers, Heldt earns tens of thousands of euros per month from his social media entertainment work; in 2023, he stated that he had a net worth of over 3,5 million euros.

== Live ==
Tim Heldt was born on 19. April 1995 in Salzgitter. He graduated from IGS Braunschweig with a Mittlere Reife. Heldt started an apprenticeship as an electrician. However, he dropped out after a month. According to himself, he strongly disliked the work and the conditions at the workplace. He than had some side jobs, including a stint at a supermarket. Heldt does not hold a completed formal vocational qualification. He lives in Braunschweig.

In 2008 Held startet to produce videos with Gaming content and Let’s Plays. Later he expanded the content to opinion videos and sometimes videos framed as comedy. Up from the 2020s Heldts content is basicialy self-reflective and addresses topics from the German-language social media and gaming scene. Since the beginning of his carrer, a large portion of his content revolves around conflicts, scandals, and missteps involving other German influencers and streamers. The most significant and protracted conflict involving Tim Heldt is his ongoing dispute with the Austrain streamer Pia Anna Scholz (Shurjoka), which began in 2023. In addition, his career has been marked by altercations with figures such as Ahmad Nadim Ahadi (ApoRed), Abdelhalim Bouhmidi (A.B.K), and Alexandra Schulze (Sashka), as well as fluctuating tensions with Anissa Baddour (Anni The Duck). Through these conflicts, he has generated a substantial amount of attention, clicks, and consequently financial revenue.

Occasionally, he also touches upon social and political issues and commented these from a conservative and right wing populist opinion.

He produced music and released a album called Dissrespekt in 2025. The album was produced as a co-operation with the German Influencers Gian-Paul N. (Twizzy) and Tim Christopher Clay (Cashisclay).

Heldt was married an has one child. He is divorced from his former wife. He made his ex-wife and his marriage the subject of his entertainment videos. He claimed to have hit his wife. Later, he retracted the statement, saying that he had only intended to provoke.
