= List of specialist schools in Germany =

This is a list of schools in Germany sorted by Specialization.

== STEM ==
- Saxony
  - Martin-Andersen-Nexö-Gymnasium Dresden
- Thuringia
  - Carl-Zeiss-Gymnasium Jena

== Languages ==
- Thuringia
  - Salzmannschule Schnepfenthal

== Sports ==
- Baden-Württemberg
  - Helmholtz-Gymnasium Heidelberg

== Arts ==
- Saxony
  - Kreuzschule Dresden
  - Sächsisches Landesgymnasium für Musik "Carl Maria von Weber", Dresden
  - Thomasschule zu Leipzig

== Schools for gifted children ==
- Baden-Württemberg
  - Landesgymnasium für Hochbegabte Schwäbisch Gmünd
- Bavaria
  - Maria-Theresia-Gymnasium Munich
- Saxony
  - Landesschule Sankt Afra Meißen
- Saxony-Anhalt
  - Landesschule Pforta

== See also ==
- Education in Germany
