= Rütli School =

Defunct school in Germany

Coordinates: 52.4875°N 13.4336°E

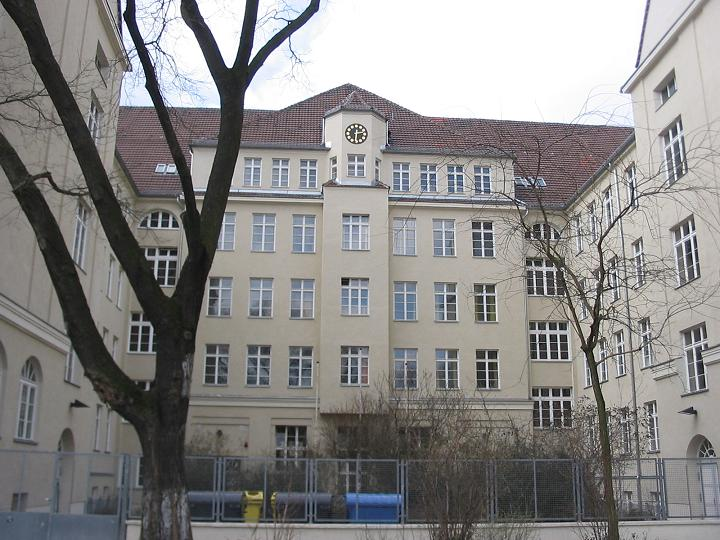

Information
- Established: 1909
- Closed: 2009
- Gender: Mixed
- Enrollment: c.1400 (1921)

The Rütli School was a Hauptschule in Neukölln, Germany, one of Berlin's districts. The school made news in 2006 when teachers wrote a letter to the senate office demanding the school be closed down, as they were no longer able to deal with violent youngsters. The letter was made public and sparked a debate about the German school system, school violence and the integration of immigrant youngsters. In 2009, it was renamed the 1. Gemeinschaftsschule and converted to a type of Gesamtschule.

== History of the Rütli school ==
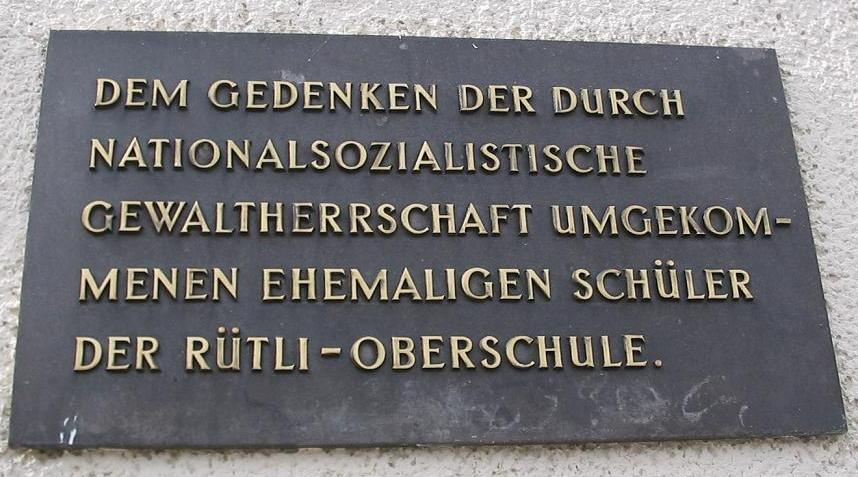
Memorial plaque commemorating dead alumni who were victims of Nazism

The Rütli school was founded in 1909. During World War I, the school building served as a barracks. In 1920, it started serving as a school again. In 1921 there were 1400 students at the school.

In the 1920s the Rütli school was known for its progressive education. While most German schools were single-sex institutions at that time, the Rütli school was co-educational. Students participated in workshops and field-trips.

The Rütli School gave rise to a circle of resistance fighters in Nazi Germany, the most famous of which was Hanno Günther. The Rütli School was closed down by the Nazis and served as a military hospital. It was reopened in 1945.

The "Campus Rütli" was founded in 2009, fusing together the Rütli School, the neighbouring Realschule and a primary school. A new nursery, a youth club, sports and leisure facilities, workshops and an advice centre were added.

== The school today ==
In the school year 2009/2010, the Rütli School was integrated into a new school, the 1. Gemeinschaftsschule, along with several classes from a nearby elementary school and a Realschule. Ninety percent of the students today are of a non-German background. The school is in a period of reform which includes the introduction of new school programs, building of new facilities, and renovation of classrooms.

The school has three gyms, a school kitchen, four PC rooms, an arts-studio, a chemistry lab, a physics lab, a wood and metal shop, and a music room. A museum informs visitors about the school's past.

=== School activities ===
- Boxing project where Rütli students can learn how to box,
- Project Rütli Wear where the students can design t-shirts and sell them online,
- Project "Zurück in die Zukunft" ("Back to the Future") where the school works to integrate dropouts back into school life,
- Cooperation with the Maxim-Gorki-Theater since 2007.

== Situation of Hauptschule in Berlin ==
The Rütli school was a Hauptschule. In 2010–11 Hauptschulen were abolished in Berlin, and were merged with Realschulen and Gesamtschulen to form a new type of comprehensive school called Stadtteilschule in Hamburg and Sekundarschule in Berlin (see: Education in Berlin).

== Debate about school violence ==
In 2006 teachers of the Rütli school wrote a letter to the Senate education office demanding the school be closed down. The letter stated:

We must realize that the mood in some classes currently is marked by aggressiveness, disrespect, and ignorance towards adults … The tendency toward violence against property is growing … In most of the families of our students, they are the only ones getting up in the morning. For them, school is a stage and battleground for attention. The worst culprits become role models. Teachers were quoted saying that their students "turn up without pens or books. [...] They fight, they set off fireworks, they kick in doors. There’s no point in trying to teach. If you hang up a poster, they tear it down."

The letter sparked a debate about school violence and the integration of immigrants.

Some of the school's faculty "refused to enter their classrooms without a mobile phone they could use to call for help if they were threatened."

Reporters flocked to the school and filmed youngsters acting violent and throwing rocks. The public was shocked. Later it was revealed that the reporters had paid the youths to act out and even provided the stones.

== Notable alumni ==
- Hanno Günther, resistance fighter against the Nazis
- Hildegard Jadamowitz, resistance fighter against the Nazis
- Horst Bosetzky, author
- Arno Funke, author
- Werner Steinbrink, member of the Herbert Baum Gruppe

== Notable former teachers ==
- Bruno Lindtner, member of the Social Democratic Party, member of the "Rote Kämpfer" resistance fighter against the Nazis
- Käthe Draeger, communist politician, psychologist and educationalist
- Wilhelm Wittbrodt, social democratic politician, progressive educationalist
- Adolf Jensen, educationalist, publicist, later a professor in Braunschweig
- Fritz Hoffmann, educationalist
- Herbert Busse, communist, educationalist
- Fritz Lange, communist publicist, politician
- Friedrich Weigelt, member of the Social Democratic Party, unionist, publicist, journalist, educationalist
