= Hauptschulabschluss =

School leaving certificate in Germany

The Hauptschulabschluss (German: [ˈhaʊptʃuːlˌʔapʃlʊs]), Berufsreife or Berufsbildungsreife (German: [bəˈʁuːfsˌbɪldʊŋsˌʁaɪfə]) is a school leaving certificate in Germany. The Hauptschulabschluss may be awarded to students who graduate from a Hauptschule or Abendhauptschule. It may also be awarded to students who leave the Realschule, Gymnasium or the Gesamtschule after having successfully completed 9th or 10th grade (depending on the State of Germany).

Those who receive the Hauptschulabschluss may start an apprenticeship (Ausbildung) and enroll in a vocational school (Berufsschule) or they may also enroll in another school in order to receive other school leaving certificates such as the Mittlere Reife.
