= Hauptschule =

German type of secondary school

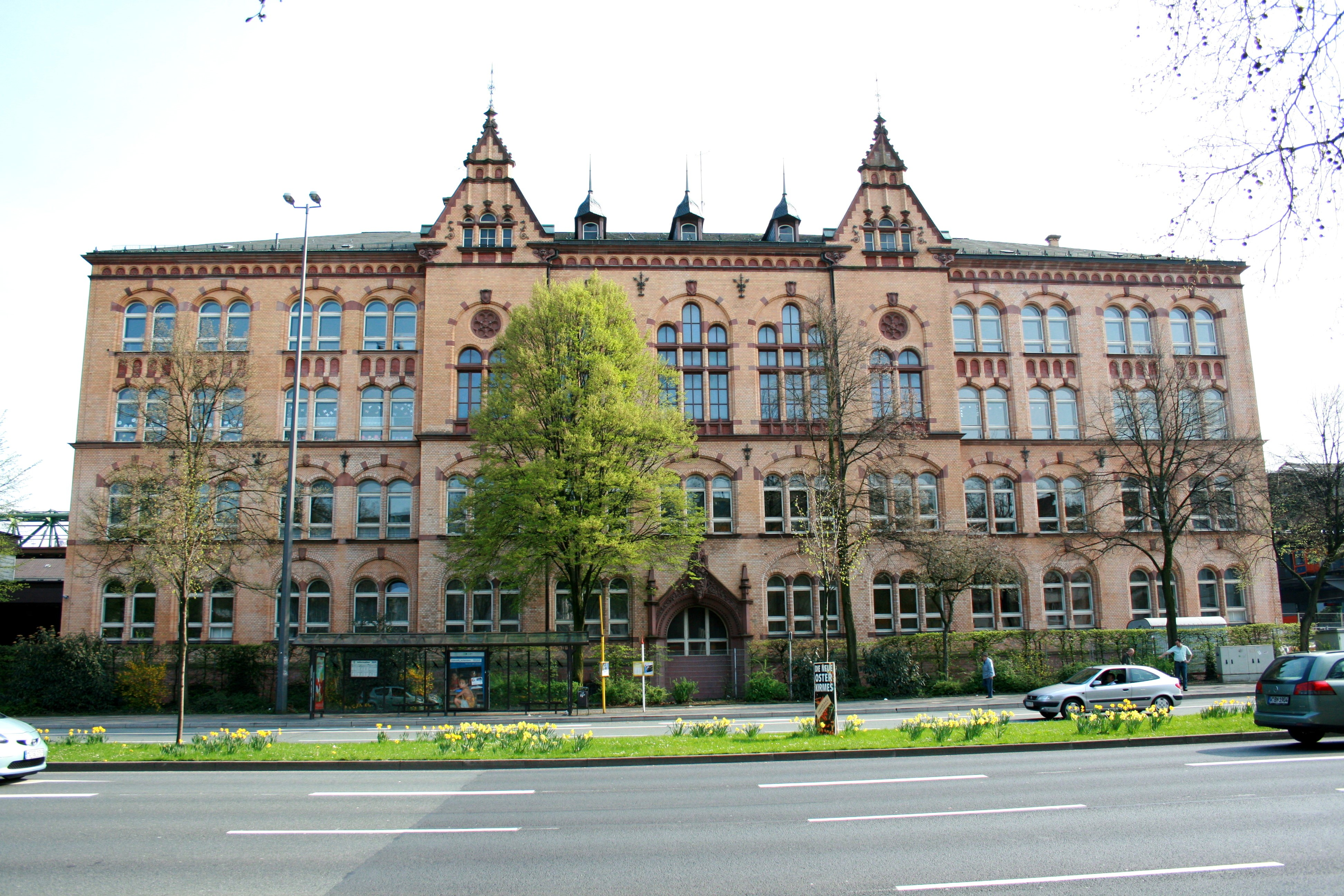
Catholic Hauptschule in Wuppertal, North Rhine-Westphalia, Germany

A Hauptschule (German: [ˈhaʊptʃuːlə], lit. 'general school') is a secondary school in Germany, starting after four years of elementary schooling (Grundschule), which offers Lower Secondary Education (Level 2) according to the International Standard Classification of Education. Any student who attends a German elementary school can go to a Hauptschule or Gesamtschule, while students who want to attend a Realschule or Gymnasium need to have good marks in order to do so. The students spend five to six years at the Hauptschule, from 5th to 9th (or 10th) grade. They finish around age 15 to 17.

== History ==
Hauptschulen (plural of Hauptschule) were first introduced in West Germany in 1950 and are now a part of secondary education in Germany, the other schools being the Gymnasium for the university-bound and the Realschule for the future technicians.

== Basics ==
The main aim of Hauptschulen is to offer young students with average grades or below, most of whom will not attend a university, an adequate general academic education. (However some of the graduates will attend a university later in life, see below.) They largely teach the same subjects as a Realschule or Gymnasium, but at a slower pace. Subjects that are taught at Gymnasien, but not at Hauptschulen, include Latin and Ancient Greek, while "work studies" (Arbeitslehre) is taught at Hauptschulen, but not at Gymnasien.

Subjects taught at a Hauptschule also include mathematics, physics/chemistry, biology, geography, history, religion (or another elective class), music, art, politics, sport and language. From the first year of Hauptschule, all children learn English. Once students have obtained their graduate certificate at the age of 15–16, they can go into practical vocational training, start work in the public service at basic or secretarial level, or attend a Berufsfachschule (full-time vocational school). The jobs for which they apply consequently require practical skills rather than academic knowledge. They may also qualify for further education in a Realschule or Gymnasium if their marks are good enough.

Most Hauptschulen are state-run and thus do not cost any money to attend; however some private Hauptschulen do exist. Such Hauptschulen have comparatively low tuition fees and/or offer stipends. The "youth welfare office" may also cover the costs of the student attending a private Hauptschule.

The German state spends more money on students attending public Hauptschulen than it spends on students attending public Realschulen or Gymnasien, and Hauptschulen have a more favourable student–teacher ratio than those other types of school. Hauptschulen often have a very diverse student body in terms of ethnic groups, languages spoken at home, religions, social classes, and students' abilities. The schools face many challenges, because they sometimes have to educate students of average abilities alongside students that have learning difficulties or need special attention. In some German states, such as Bavaria, Hauptschulen offer different classes to their students. They offer the so-called M-classes for it advanced students, regular classes and the so-called P-classes for students who are struggling.

Percentage of jobholders holding Hauptschulabschluss, Realschulabschluss or Abitur in Germany:

	1970	1982	1991	2000
Hauptschulabschluss	87.7%	79.3%	66.5%	54.9%
Realschulabschluss	10.9%	17.7%	27%	34.1%
Abitur	1.4%	3%	6.5%	11%

Historically, a vast majority in Germany went to Hauptschule; in 2000 54.5% of jobholders had an Hauptschulabschluss, indicating they graduated from one. However, in the 1970s an educational expansion started and parents started sending their children to better schools. Thus younger jobholders are less likely to hold a Hauptschulabschluss than older ones.

== Problems ==
The percentage of children attending a Hauptschule differs very much by region (it may be as high as 60% or as low as 4%). Most Hauptschulen reside in conservative areas (like Bavaria), because conservative parties want to strengthen the Hauptschule, while the SPD closed Hauptschulen, replacing them with comprehensive schools. In these areas, in many cases, the Hauptschule is not a school of first choice for a student and is attended by students of whom is believed that they for a number of reasons may not profit from the more competitive environment of other schools.

In some areas where few students attend the Hauptschule and those who do often suffer from learning disabilities, Hauptschule students have come to be increasingly stigmatized in recent years, the opinion of the general public often being that Hauptschulen only harbor the bottom end of society. Stereotypes of dysfunctional family backgrounds, absent and/or unemployed parents and domestic violence and alcohol abuse are often cited when describing what is believed to be the typical social origin of these students. Teachers often complain about ongoing difficulties in trying to properly educate them and parents refusing to take responsibility. Moreover, and based on these problems, in some areas it has become very hard for Hauptschule graduates to find qualified work or begin an apprenticeship, even in professions which traditionally welcomed them and in some areas have now shifted their focus to better qualified applicants, e.g. mechanics, construction or sales. In some areas, an overwhelming majority of each graduating class is therefore forced to accept low-paying unskilled labor or live on welfare indefinitely; many choose to stay in school for another year to obtain their diploma, which slightly, but not fundamentally, improves their career prospects. In 2006 a debate about violence at German Hauptschulen was sparked after teachers of the infamous Rütli School wrote a letter to the senate office demanding the school be closed down. The letter stated:

We must realize that the mood in some classes currently is marked by aggressiveness, disrespect, and ignorance towards adults … The tendency toward violence against property is growing … In most of the families of our students, they are the only ones getting up in the morning. For them, school is a stage and battleground for attention. The worst culprits become role models

Baumert, Stanat and Watermann did a report on so-called "problem schools" in 2000. "Problem schools" according to the scientists were:

Hauptschulen that exist in an underprivileged environment. There is a cumulation of risk factors. Half of all students have repeated a grade. [...] 40 percent of parents have not learned a trade. One-third of parents have no job. The percentage of students who destroyed school property is high. The level of aptitude and performance on tests is very low. 16 percent of Hauptschulen must be called a problem school.

The number of "problem schools" that could be identified varied greatly by State of Germany. In Bavaria no "problem school" could be found. In Baden-Württemberg only 4.8 percent of Hauptschulen and in Rheinland-Pfalz 8.7 percent of Hauptschulen must be called "problem schools". In contrast, 60 percent of all Hauptschulen in Berlin, 68.8 percent of Hauptschulen in Hamburg and 95.7 percent of all Hauptschulen that existed in Bremen must be called "problem schools". (Berlin and Hamburg have abolished the Hauptschule since then.)

The graduation certificate is the Hauptschulabschluss, which like the assignment to other types of high schools is less valuable than the Realschulabschluss or university-bound Abitur. Furthermore, persons holding a Hauptschulabschluss may go to night school to earn their Realschulabschluss or Abitur. However, in some German states students that do well enough in Hauptschule receive the Mittlere Reife. Students holding a Mittlere Reife are allowed to participate in classes at the Gymnasium. They can get their Abitur there.

== Hauptschulen in different Bundesländer (federal states) of Germany ==
Some states of Germany do not have a Hauptschule. In most eastern German states, Hauptschulen never existed and still do not exist. In the German Democratic Republic most students attended a polytechnical school, and only a select few attended a specialist school. Nowadays, all eastern German states offer some kind of "Intermediate School" (which may be called Regelschule, Mittelschule, or Regionale Schule). It has to be pointed out that while those schools are called "intermediate schools", there are actually no "intermediate schools", because no school called "lower school" exists. Intermediate schools do not select students on aptitude. All states of eastern Germany also offer Gymnasien, while all but Saxony also offer comprehensive schools.

In the German state of Saarland, the Hauptschule has been abolished, and Hauptschulen have been merged with Realschulen to form "Erweiterte Realschulen", however those "Erweiterte Realschulen" still do stream by ability after 7th grade. They offer a fast and a slow track. The state of Schleswig-Holstein also abolished the Hauptschule and mainstreamed students into the Regionalschule.

The state of Rhineland-Palatinate has merged Hauptschulen and Realschulen to form a new type of school called "Realschule plus", which offers general education classes (that resemble classes held at the normal Realschule) as well as remedial classes.

== Abolition of the Hauptschule in Berlin and Hamburg ==
Starting in 2010/2011 Hauptschulen were formally abolished in the German States Berlin and Hamburg. They were merged with Realschulen and Gesamtschulen to form a new type of comprehensive school called Stadtteilschule in Hamburg and Sekundarschule in Berlin (see: Education in Berlin, Education in Hamburg).

== Similarities to American schools ==
In the United States, most schools are comprehensive high schools and educate students of all ability ranges, as the concept of tracking by test score was largely abandoned there by the 21st century. However, some school districts, such as the Renton School District, maintain separate schools for students who do not succeed in the comprehensive school, usually students who get the lowest test score results. Although most US students get uniform diplomas, some states are adopting high school graduation examinations with very high standards.

Although Marc Tucker of the NCEE designed the Certificate of Initial Mastery around the German education model, most US states expect all students to meet one high passing standard, and tests are used to ensure success for all rather than sorting between types of high schools. High school is mandatory until the age of 17–18 in most states, but those who leave before receiving a diploma are considered to be dropouts with a dismal future. All students, even those not going to college, must graduate with the skills necessary to succeed in college. It is thought that the incentive of losing a diploma will provide enough incentive to make that a reality, but some critics doubt that it was ever a practical idea. Students who do not pass the tests will receive no diploma or alternate documents that indicate that they do not meet the state's minimum standards for graduation.
