= Mittlere Reife =

German secondary school qualification

The Mittlere Reife (German: [ˈmɪtləʁə ˈʁaɪfə], lit. "Middle Maturity") is a school-leaving certificate in Germany that is usually awarded after ten years of schooling. It is widely regarded as being broadly comparable in level to the British GCSE.

The official name varies between the federal states, including Realschulabschluss, Mittlerer Schulabschluss, Wirtschaftsschulabschluss, Qualifizierter Sekundarabschluss I, and Sekundarabschluss I – Realschulabschluss. The Mittlere Reife can be awarded through several educational pathways, including the Hauptschule, Realschule, Werkrealschule, Berufsfachschule, Wirtschaftsschule, and Gesamtschule.

== Legal framework ==
The Mittlere Reife is a nationally recognised qualification under German education law, but the exact regulations differ by federal state.

In Bavaria, for example, Article 25 (2) of the Bavarian Education Act (Bayerisches Gesetz über das Erziehungs- und Unterrichtswesen – BayEUG) establishes that promotion to Year 11 of a Gymnasium automatically confers the Mittlerer Schulabschluss (Mittlere Reife). The law provides that advancing to Year 11 constitutes recognition of the intermediate school-leaving qualification.

According to § 39 (9) of the Gymnasialschulordnung (GSO), the corresponding statement appears directly on the student's final Year 10 report card as:

„Dieses Zeugnis schließt den Nachweis eines mittleren Schulabschlusses ein.“

(“This report certifies the award of an intermediate school-leaving qualification.”)

No separate diploma is issued; instead, the qualification is formally recorded within this school report. Similar provisions exist in other Länder.

== Educational progression ==
Holders of the Mittlere Reife have completed intermediate secondary education but are not yet eligible for direct university admission. To progress to higher education, students typically continue to a school that awards the Abitur, such as an Aufbaugymnasium, Fachoberschule (FOS), or Abendgymnasium. Once the Abitur is achieved, university entry becomes possible.

== International equivalence ==
The Mittlere Reife is commonly compared to:

- the GCSE in the United Kingdom,
- the Diplôme National du Brevet in France,
- the Junior Certificate in Ireland, and
- the High school diploma in the United States (without Advanced Placement or SAT Subject Test equivalence).

Recognition for international or vocational purposes may vary depending on the context and the authority assessing the qualification. Official recognition bodies such as ECCTIS evaluate the Mittlere Reife as a formal, nationally awarded secondary qualification when accompanied by the statement „Dieses Zeugnis schließt den Nachweis eines mittleren Schulabschlusses ein.“ (“This report certifies the award of the intermediate school-leaving qualification”).

Non-German graduation certificates comparable to the Mittlere Reife, such as the American high school diploma, generally do not by themselves qualify the holder for German university admission. However, students may still become eligible by completing additional recognised tests such as the SAT or ACT.
