= Fachoberschule =

The Fachoberschule is a type of German vocational school for young people aged 16 to 18 years old. It also provides a pathway into university in some areas of Germany.

== History ==
The concept of the Fachoberschule was introduced in 1969 in West Germany as a result of student protests in the 1960s, which culminated in the protests of 1968, except for Baden-Württemberg. They were opened throughout most of the country at the beginning of the school year 1969/70. Hamburg and Berlin started at Easter 1970 and Bavaria on 9 September 1970.

== Grades ==
The Fachoberschule is usually attended by students of the German school grades 11 and 12.

In the German federal states of North Rhine-Westphalia, Hamburg, Bavaria (since the 2004/2005 school year), and Berlin (since 2010 in the form of a pilot project at two schools), there is also a further year group, where students can complete their Abitur (university entrance qualification).

== Curriculum ==
Different subjects are offered depending on the state. In Baden-Württemberg this type of school does not exist; instead, various types of school offer vocational education, which lead to similar qualifications as a Fachoberschule.

State	Subjects
Bavaria	Technology; Economy, Administration and Management; Social work; Design; Agriculture, bio and environmental technology. From 2013 as a trial at three schools, international business and health
Berlin	Technology (Including: metalwork, electronics, construction, woodwork and fashion design); Economy & Administration and Management; Social pedagogy; Health; Nutrition and housekeeping; Layout; Agricultural economics; Natural sciences (chemistry, biology and physics)
Brandenburg	Technology (Including: construction, electronics, metalwork, surveying, agriculture, chemistry); Economy & Administration and Management; Social pedagogy; Care and health; Home economics; Design (Including: clothing, graphics and interior design)
Hamburg	Technology (Including: construction, electronics, metalwork, surveying, agriculture, chemistry); Economy & Administration and Management; Social pedagogy; Nursing and Health; Home economics; Design (Including: clothing, graphics and interior design)
Hesse	Design; Health; Social work; Technology (focus: mechanical engineering, electrical engineering, construction, chemical / physical technology, textile and clothing, IT); Economy (focus: agriculture, nutrition and housekeeping, economy and administration, business informatics)
Mecklenburg-Vorpommern	Economy; Administration; Metal technology; Seafaring; Electrical engineering; Construction engineering; Computer science; Layout; Nutrition and housekeeping; Agricultural economics; Social pedagogy
Lower Saxony	Economy and administration (focus: economy, administration and administration of justice, IT); Technology (focus: computer science; construction; electronics; metal); Health and social affairs (focus: health care, social pedagogy); Layout; Nutrition and housekeeping; agricultural economics
North Rhine-Westphalia	Agriculture, biological and environmental technology; Nutrition and housekeeping; Design; Health and social affairs; Technology (focus: construction and wood technology, electrical engineering, metal technology, textile technology and clothing, printing technology, and physics, chemistry, biology); economy & Administration and Management
Rhineland-Palatinate	Technology; Natural sciences; Economy; Social work; Nutrition and housekeeping; Design; Agricultural economics; policing
Saarland	Technology; Engineering (natural sciences and environmental technology); Economy; Social pedagogy; Design; Tourism; nutrition
Saxony	Technology; Economy & Administration and Management; Social work; Layout; Agricultural economics; Police enforcement service
Saxony-Anhalt	Technology (focus: construction, electrical, metal, information, media); Economy (focus: economy, administration and administration of justice); Health and social affairs (focus: social affairs); Layout; Agricultural economics; Police enforcement service
Schleswig-Holstein	Technology; Economy; Nutrition and housekeeping; Health and social work; Design; agricultural economics
Thüringia	Technology (focus: metal, electrical, construction, media, information, general technology, optics); Economy and administration (focus: general economy, hotel and tourism, media economy); Health and social work; Nutrition and housekeeping; design
