= 2009–10 Grenoble Foot 38 season =

Grenoble Foot 38
2009–10 season
- President: Kazutoshi Watanabe
- Stadium: Stade des Alpes
- Ligue 1: 20th (relegated)
- Coupe de France: Round of 32
- Coupe de la Ligue: Third round
- Average home league attendance: 13,910
- Biggest defeat: Grenoble 0–4 Rennes; Paris Saint-Germain 4–0 Grenoble; Rennes 4–0 Grenoble; Toulouse 4–0 Grenoble
Home colours	Away colours

The 2009–10 season was the 99th season in the history of Grenoble Foot 38 and the club's second consecutive season in the top flight of French football. In addition to the domestic league, Grenoble participated in this season's editions of the Coupe de France and the Coupe de la Ligue.

== Players ==
=== First-team squad ===
Note: Flags indicate national team as defined under FIFA eligibility rules; some limited exceptions apply. Players may hold more than one non-FIFA nationality.

No.	Pos.	Nation	Player
—	GK	FRA	Brice Maubleu
—	DF	FRA	Hugo Cianci
—	DF	FRA	Abdel Lamanje
—	DF	FRA	Giovanni Oliveri
—	DF	FRA	Romain Villard
—	MF	FRA	Mehdi Bourabia
—	MF	FRA	Adrien Brusetti
—	MF	FRA	Jimmy Juan

No.	Pos.	Nation	Player
—	MF	FRA	Laurent Macquet
—	MF	FRA	Francis Dady Ngoye
—	MF	FRA	Jonathan Tinhan
—	MF	FRA	Atila Turan
—	FW	CGO	Thernand Bakouboula
—	FW	FRA	Marc Montiel
—	MF	FRA	Romain Provenzano

== Pre-season and friendlies ==
Win Draw Loss

15 July 2009 Friendly	Sochaux (France)	2–1	(France) Grenoble	France
18:00 CEST (UTC+2)

18 July 2009 Friendly	Évian (France)	1–2	(France) Grenoble	France
--:-- CEST (UTC+2)

22 July 2009 Friendly	Grenoble (France)	1–3	(France) Saint-Étienne	France
19:00 CEST (UTC+2)

25 July 2009 Friendly	Grenoble (France)	2–1	(France) Istres	France
18:30 CEST (UTC+2)

31 July 2009 Friendly	Grenoble (France)	0–0	(France) Montpellier	France
18:00 CEST (UTC+2)

== Competitions ==
=== Overall record ===
Competition	First match	Last match	Starting round	Final position	Record							
Competition	First match	Last match	Starting round	Final position	Pld	W	D	L	GF	GA	GD	Win %
Ligue 1	8 August 2009	15 May 2010	Matchday 1	20th	38	5	8	25	31	61	−30	13.16
Coupe de France	23 January 2010	26 January 2010	Round of 64	Round of 32	2	1	0	1	6	6	+0	50.00
Coupe de France	22 September 2009		Third round	Third round	1	0	0	1	0	1	−1	0.00
Total					41	6	8	27	37	68	−31	14.63

Source: Competitions

=== Ligue 1 ===
==== League table ====
Pos	Team	Pld	W	D	L	GF	GA	GD	Pts	Qualification or relegation
16	Sochaux	38	11	8	19	28	52	−24	41	
17	Saint-Étienne	38	10	10	18	27	45	−18	40	
18	Le Mans (R)	38	8	8	22	36	59	−23	32	Relegation to Ligue 2
19	Boulogne (R)	38	7	10	21	31	62	−31	31	Relegation to Ligue 2
20	Grenoble (R)	38	5	8	25	31	61	−30	23	Relegation to Ligue 2

Source: Ligue 1
Rules for classification: 1) points; 2) goal difference; 3) number of goals scored.
(R) Relegated

==== Results summary ====
Overall								Home						Away					
Pld	W	D	L	GF	GA	GD	Pts	W	D	L	GF	GA	GD	W	D	L	GF	GA	GD
33	0	8	25	0	61	−61	8	0	5	10	0	28	−28	0	3	15	0	33	−33

Source: Ligue 1

==== Results by round ====
Round	1	2	3	4	5	6	7	8	9	10	11	12	13	14	15	16	17	18	19	20	21	22	23	24	25	26	27	28	29	30	31	32	33	34	35	36	37	38
Ground	H	A	H	A	A	H	A	H	A	H	A	H	A	H	A	H	A	H	A	H	H	A	H	A	H	A	H	A	H	A	H	A	H	A	H	A	H	A
Result	L	L	L	L	L	L	L	L	L	L	L	L	D	D	D	L	L	D	L	L	L	L	L	L	L	L	D	L	D	L	L	L	D	L	L	D	L	L
Position	17	18	18	20	20	20	20	20	20	20	20	20	20	20	20	20	20	20	20	20	20	20	20	20	20	20	20	20	20	20	20	20	20	20	20	20	20	20

Source: Ligue 1
A = Away; H = Home; W = Win; D = Draw; L = Loss

==== Matches ====
8 August 2009 1	Grenoble	0–2	Marseille	Grenoble
				Stadium: Stade des Alpes

16 August 2009 2	Boulogne	2–1	Grenoble	Boulogne-sur-Mer
				Stadium: Stade de la Libération

23 August 2009 3	Grenoble	1–2	Lens	Grenoble
				Stadium: Stade des Alpes

29 August 2009 4	Saint-Étienne	1–0	Grenoble	Saint-Étienne
				Stadium: Stade Geoffroy-Guichard

12 September 2009 5	Bordeaux	1–0	Grenoble	Bordeaux
				Stadium: Stade Chaban-Delmas

19 September 2009 6	Grenoble	0–4	Rennes	Grenoble
				Stadium: Stade des Alpes

26 September 2009 7	Auxerre	2–0	Grenoble	Auxerre
				Stadium: Stade de l'Abbé-Deschamps

3 October 2009 8	Grenoble	2–3	Montpellier	Grenoble
				Stadium: Stade des Alpes

17 October 2009 9	Valenciennes	2–0	Grenoble	Valenciennes
				Stadium: Stade Nungesser

24 October 2009 10	Grenoble	1–2	Nancy	Grenoble
				Stadium: Stade des Alpes

31 October 2009 12	Grenoble	0–2	Lille	Grenoble
				Stadium: Stade des Alpes

7 November 2009 13	Monaco	0–0	Grenoble	Monaco
				Stadium: Stade Louis II

21 November 2009 14	Grenoble	1–1	Lyon	Grenoble
				Stadium: Stade des Alpes

28 November 2009 15	Lorient	2–2	Grenoble	Lorient
				Stadium: Stade du Moustoir

6 December 2009 16	Grenoble	0–1	Toulouse	Grenoble
				Stadium: Stade des Alpes

13 December 2009 17	Sochaux	1–0	Grenoble	Montbéliard
				Stadium: Stade Auguste Bonal

16 December 2009 11	Le Mans	1–0	Grenoble	Le Mans
				Stadium: Stade Léon-Bollée

19 December 2009 18	Grenoble	1–1	Nice	Grenoble
				Stadium: Stade des Alpes

23 December 2009 19	Paris Saint-Germain	4–0	Grenoble	Paris
				Stadium: Parc des Princes

16 January 2010 20	Grenoble	1–2	Saint-Étienne	Grenoble
				Stadium: Stade des Alpes

20 January 2010 21	Grenoble	1–3	Bordeaux	Grenoble
				Stadium: Stade des Alpes

30 January 2010 22	Rennes	4–0	Grenoble	Rennes
				Stadium: Stade de la Route de Lorient

6 February 2010 23	Grenoble	0–5	Auxerre	Grenoble
				Stadium: Stade des Alpes

13 February 2010 24	Montpellier	1–0	Grenoble	Montpellier
				Stadium: Stade de la Mosson

20 February 2010 25	Grenoble	0–1	Valenciennes	Grenoble
				Stadium: Stade des Alpes

27 February 2010 26	Nancy	2–0	Grenoble	Tomblaine
				Stadium: Stade Marcel Picot

7 March 2010 27	Grenoble	1–1	Le Mans	Grenoble
				Stadium: Stade des Alpes

14 March 2010 28	Lille	1–0	Grenoble	Villeneuve d'Ascq
				Stadium: Stadium Lille Métropole

20 March 2010 29	Grenoble	0–0	Monaco	Grenoble
				Stadium: Stade des Alpes

27 March 2010 30	Lyon	2–0	Grenoble	Lyon
				Stadium: Stade Gerland

3 April 2010 31	Grenoble	1–2	Lorient	Grenoble
				Stadium: Stade des Alpes

10 April 2010 32	Toulouse	4–0	Grenoble	Toulouse
				Stadium: Stadium de Toulouse

17 April 2010 33	Grenoble	2–2	Sochaux	Grenoble
				Stadium: Stade des Alpes

24 April 2010 34	Nice	2–1	Grenoble	Nice
				Stadium: Stade du Ray

27 April 2010 35	Grenoble	0–4	Paris Saint-Germain	Grenoble
				Stadium: Stade des Alpes

5 May 2010 36	Lens	1–1	Grenoble	Lens
				Stadium: Stade Félix-Bollaert

8 May 2010 37	Grenoble	0–2	Boulogne	Grenoble
				Stadium: Stade des Alpes

15 May 2010 38	Marseille	2–0	Grenoble	Marseille
				Stadium: Stade Vélodrome

=== Coupe de France ===
23 January 2010 Round of 64	Grenoble	3–2 (a.e.t.)	Montpellier	Grenoble
15:00				Stadium: Stade des Alpes; Attendance: 4,786

26 January 2010 Round of 32	Vannes OC	4–3 (a.e.t.)	Grenoble	Vannes
19:00				Stadium: Stade de la Rabine; Attendance: 1,723

=== Coupe de la Ligue ===
22 September 2009 Third round	Lorient	1–0	Grenoble	Lorient
20:45				Stadium: Stade Yves Allainmat; Attendance: 7,202; Referee: Antony Gautier
