= Cellatex =

French textile company

Cellatex SA
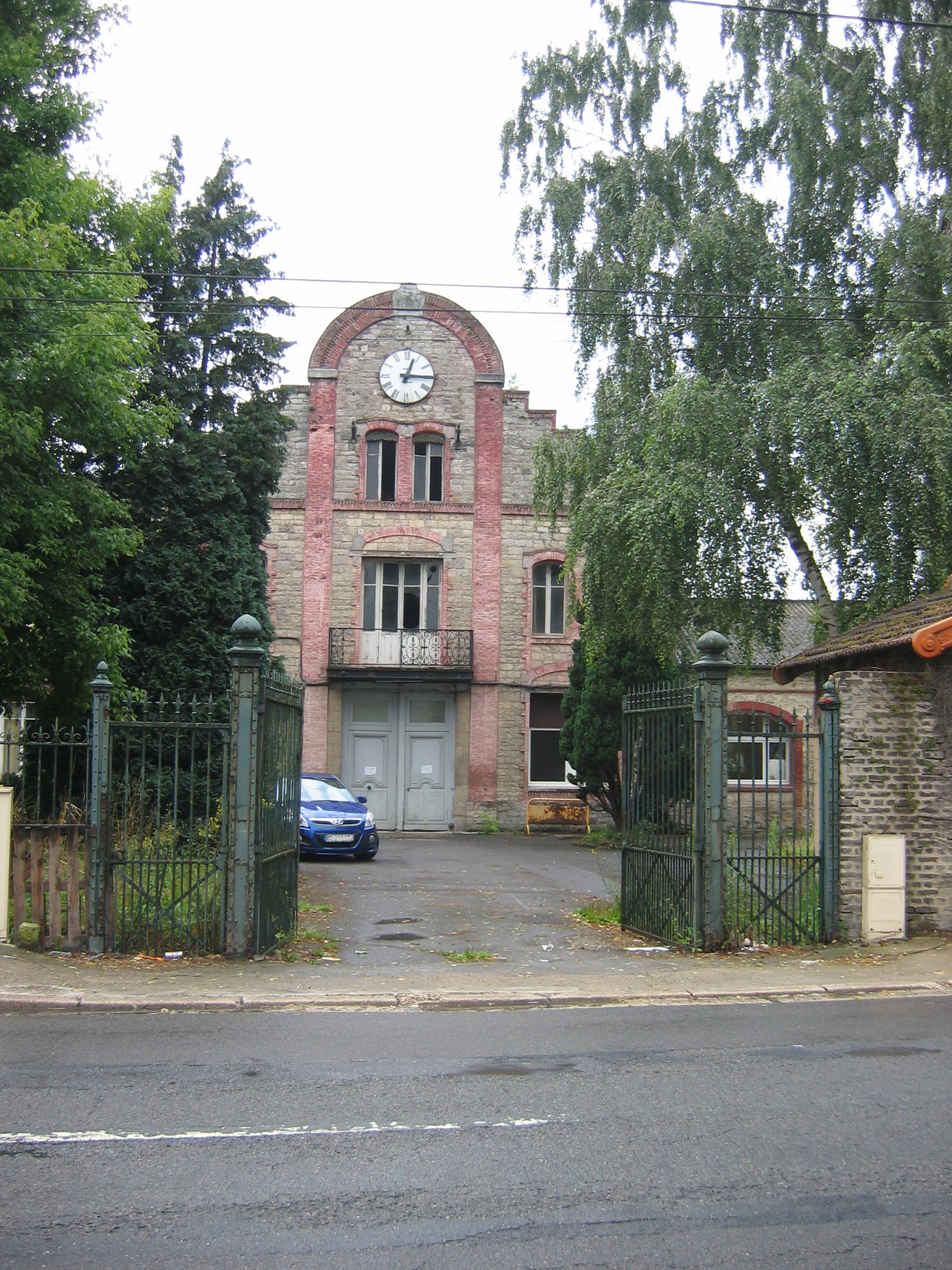
- Former Cellatex headquarters in Givet. This building was constructed in the early 20th century (photo above taken in 2012 and photo below shortly after construction).
- Founded: 1902; 1990 (registration of the company)
- Defunct: 24 July 1997: liquidation 26 February 1998: disposal plan 23 September 2011: deletion from the Trade Register
- Headquarters: Givet, France
- Key people: Gillet Family
- Products: Rayon
- Services: Manufacture of artificial or synthetic fibers APE 247Z
- Footnotes; Some important dates include: 1903: start of operations 1912: change in business processes 1919: reconstruction 1971: Acquisition by Rhône-Poulenc; 1981: Cellatex, the new name 1991: divestment by Rhône-Poulenc; 2000: liquidation

Cellatex SA is a former French rayon spinning company, founded in 1981 on the basis of a business established in 1902 in Givet, Ardennes (France), and liquidated in 2000.

Cellatex was the last name of a company that changed its name several times, following mergers, takeovers, changes of shareholders and restructuring. The closure of Cellatex marked the end of the chemical and textile industry in France, born of innovative approaches in the late 19th century, which prospered between the wars and during the Trente Glorieuses.

In 2000, the liquidation was marked by an occupation of the Givet plant, with workers threatening to use the chemicals to blow up the installations or pollute the Meuse river. This rather hard-hitting movement received considerable media coverage, and enabled the former employees to obtain more significant support measures.

== Invention of artificial silk ==
Silkworm imitations were sought after for several centuries. In the mid-19th century, changes in clothing habits and difficulties in silk supply, following the outbreaks of pébrine and flacherie diseases, (Note: In the second half of the 19th century, these diseases decimated silkworm] farms in France, Europe (in French)and Asia. Despsummaryuis Pasteur's research and advances in microbiology, they led to the decline of French sericulture.) heightened the interest in this research.

A Frenchman, Count Hilaire de Chardonnet, Louis Pasteur's assistant in his research into silkworm diseases perfected the first industrializable process for dissolving cellulose, passing the resulting product through a spinneret and solidifying it at the end. In 1890, considered the father of artificial silk, he founded the "Société anonyme pour la fabrication de la soie de Chardonnet", with workshops in Besançon. This was the first factory to produce artificial silk industrially, using the nitrocellulose process (also known as the collodion process).

Following on from this, Germans, Americans, and English developed very similar industrial processes, differing in the way cellulose was solubilized and regenerated.

Three main processes competed with the approach developed by Comte Hilaire de Chardonnet:

Givet plant
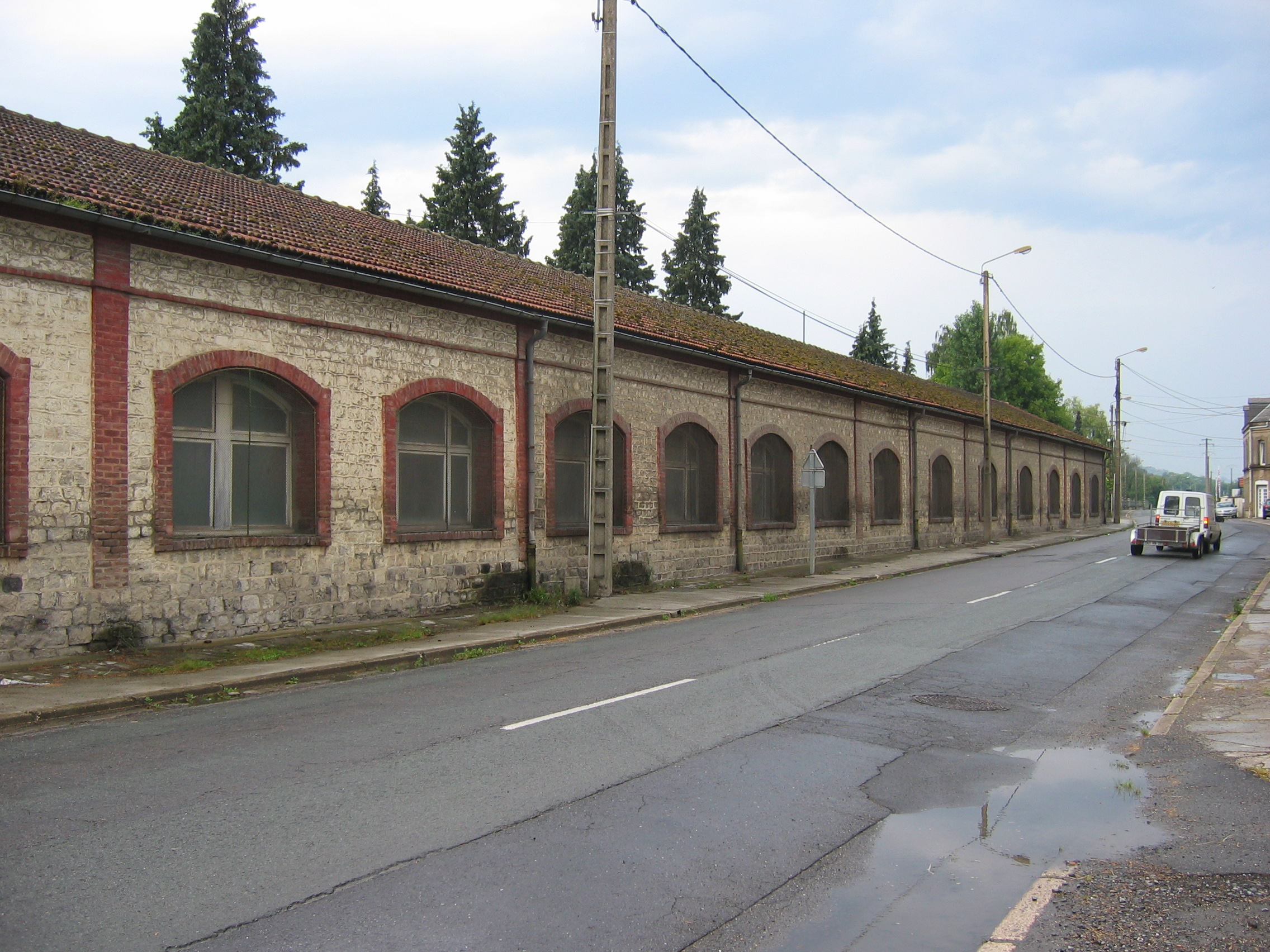
- Street façade of the Givet factory.

- Location within France Location within Champagne-Ardenne
- Operated: 1902–2000
- Location: Givet (Ardennes) France
- Coordinates: 50°09′27″N 4°49′28″E

- copper process;
- rayon process;
- cellulose acetate process.

In March 1902, a second plant was set up in France, in Givet, under the name "La Soie Artificielle", to manufacture silk using the so-called copper silk process. The company's founders were industrial and financial players with an eye for developments in the textile industry: the Schlumberger, Noack-Dollfus, Jordan, Bernheim, Frémery, Herbelot and Monod families, and the economist Edmond Théry. The chosen industrial site was located three kilometers from the town of Givet, at a place called "les Quatre Cheminées", and two kilometers from the Belgian border, along the road linking Givet to Namur. The same group of shareholders joined forces with Lyon dyers, the Gillet family, to set up another company using the same process, "Soie Artificielle d'Izieux", in Izieux near Saint-Chamond.

In 1911, together with their competitor, the Carnot group, (Note: This rival group, the Carnot Group, was founded by Ernest Carnot, of the Carnot family. Ernest Carnot (1866–1955) was a civil mining engineer, son of former French President Sadi Carnot and grandson on his mother's side of the economist Charles Brook Dupont-White. At the beginning of the 20th century, Ernest Carnot founded the company "La Viscose française", and subsequently set up subsidiaries in Spain, Italy, Belgium and Switzerland.) the Gillet family set up the "Comptoir des Textiles Artificiels" (CTA), a company specializing in the marketing of artificial textiles. This CTA also bought out other factories, including the historic Besançon plant.

In 1912, the Givet and Izieux plants switched from the copper silk process to the rayon process. The Besançon plant followed suit. Rayon had the advantage of being obtained from wood pulp, and required only inexpensive chemicals. Its cost price was lower. In addition to these three companies, the entire French artificial silk industry converged on this technique shortly before World War I. The production of rayon and viscose silk in France was a major step forward. Between 1900 and 1913, the quantity of artificial silk produced in Europe increased tenfold, and just before World War I, represented a third of the quantity of natural silk produced. The surface area of the Givet plants increased from 8,000 to 21,000 m² in ten years. This plant also employed 790 people in 1914.

From 31 August 1914 Givet found itself in occupied territory, and the plant was transformed into a hospital and a fat, margarine and canned food factory. Textile-related industrial equipment was requisitioned and shipped to Germany. Transmissions and engines were removed. Equipment that could not be shipped was broken up on site, after having been stripped of its lead, copper, bronze and other parts.

== Development of the rayon process ==
The rebuilding of Givet's industrial textile facilities began in early January 1919, two months after the Armistice. In June 1919, the company's management sent a delegation to Germany to try to recover the equipment requisitioned by the occupying forces during World War I, with the help of the services of the Ministry of Industrial Reconstruction, set up in Wiesbaden specifically for this purpose. Sixty-five wagons of equipment were shipped back to Givet, facilitating the restart of operations on 1 December 1919.

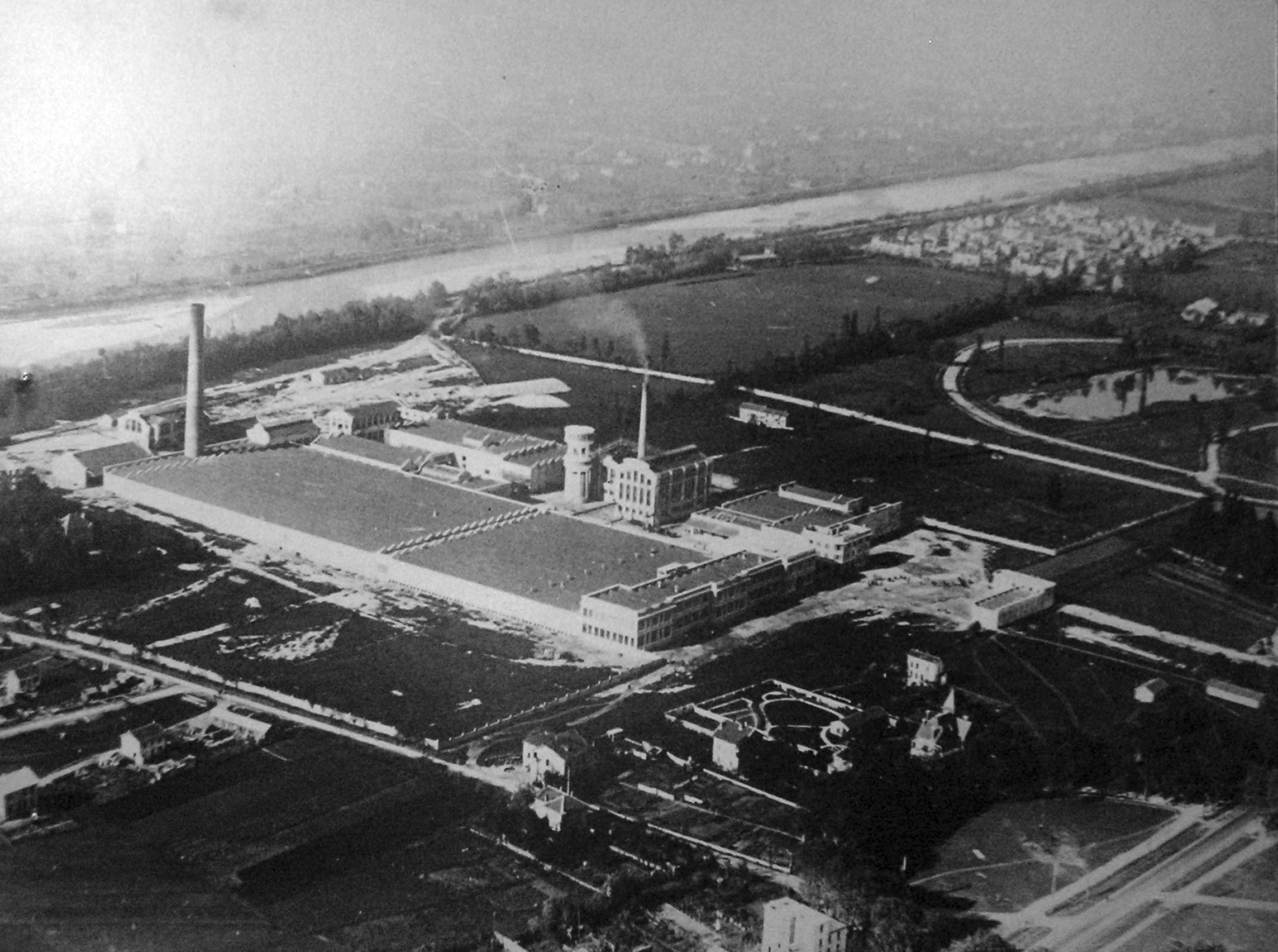
Aerial view of the Échirolles rayon factories in 1928

Grenoble plant
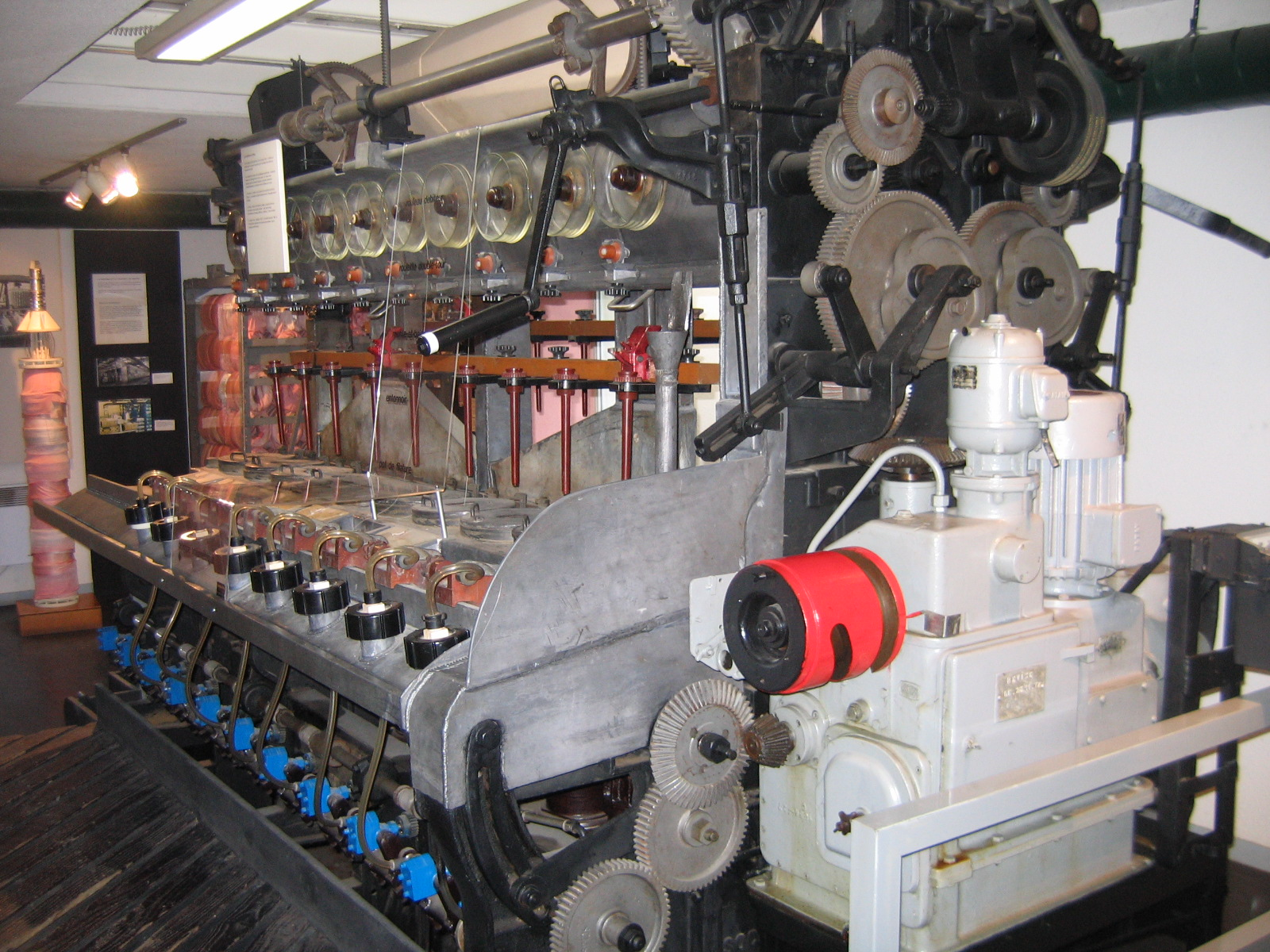
- Viscose spinner, Musée de la viscose, Échirolles.

- Location within Auvergne-Rhône-Alpes Location within France
- Operated: 1927–1989
- Location: Grenoble (Isère) France
- Coordinates: 45°9′26″N 5°42′10″E

Throughout France artificial silk production, temporarily disrupted by the war, expanded. By 1920, the weight of artificial silk production exceeded that of natural silk. The scarcity of bombyx silk, and the development of luxury and faux-luxury in all social classes, created a dynamic for viscose (later called rayon) production. The two artificial silk companies in Givet and Izieux, sharing the same shareholders, merged in 1922. But as the original patents fell into the public domain, new producers appeared. The number of plants increased, and some fifty industrial sites were created in France, including, again by Gillet, (Note: At the end of World War I, the Gillet family in Lyon owned a large number of industrial companies in the textile and chemical sectors. Enemond Bizot (1900–1988), Edmond Gillet's son-in-law, joined forces with his cousin Lucien Chatin (1868–1947), director of the company "La soie artificielle d'Izieux", to found the "Société Nationale de la Viscose" and build the factory in Grenoble.) a major plant in Grenoble, more precisely between Grenoble and Échirolles. (Note: The factory was built on Grenoble territory, on the boundary between this territory and that of Échirolles 45.162°N 5.705°E. The cité-jardin de la Viscose was locaten on Échirolles. In the early 1980s, a bypass, the rocade sud, was built between the two sites, culminating in a huge interchange.) The site was large enough for the Société grenobloise de tramways électriques (Grenoble electric tramway company) to provide special double-track service from the Rondeau.

During the 1920s–1930s, 300 housing units were built nearby in Givet, the "Cités de la Soie", (Note: Aerial photograph in external links.) as well as a chapel in 1932. Buses criss-crossed the region, in France and Belgium, to bring the workers to work. When Georges Simenon described a plant in Givet in 1932, in his novel Chez les Flamands, he was clearly inspired by the artificial silk factory on rue du Bon Secours. Making artificial silk thread from sheets of wood pulp was hard work, in heat, humidity, acids and the "rotten egg" smell of hydrogen sulfide.

The economic crisis of the 1930s halted the creation of new artificial silk plants. The boom was over. Plants closed. In 1934, under pressure from traditional silk manufacturers, a law prohibited the use of the name "artificial silk": viscose yarn was henceforth called "rayon" (and "fibranne" for short fibers). During World War II, French industry, unable to obtain sufficient supplies of natural fibers, turned even more to artificial fibers.

== Creation of Cellatex ==
From 1950 onwards the emergence of synthetic fibers such as nylon and polyester, and their success on the market, led to the decline of artificial silk, later known as rayon. In 1959, Soie Artificielle Givet-Izieux merged with Viscose Française (which had acquired the Grenoble plant) to create Compagnie Industrielle des Textiles Artificiels et Synthétiques. This new company also included the Comptoir des Textiles Artificiels, and adopted the acronym of the latter (CTA). At the end of the 1950s, this holding company brought together a dozen industrial sites producing rayon. Faced with competition from synthetic textiles, certain plants, such as the Saint-Maurice-de-Beynost plant, (Note: The Saint-Maurice-de-Beynost textile and chemical plant was an artificial silk factory founded like so many others before the crisis of the 1930s, quickly surrounded, like so many others, by a Cité de la Soie created by shareholders to retain a workforce close to the plant, bought out like so many others by the CTA.) were converted and sold. CTA's various industrial centers also benefited from the innovations developed within the Group, starting in the interwar period with the wet strength of rayon fibers and their resistance to repeated washing, followed by high-tenacity yarns, enabling entry into new markets such as tires, and polynosic fibers, with less sensitivity to water and better mechanical characteristics.

In 1971 the Compagnie Industrielle des Textiles Artificiels et Synthétiques merged with Rhodia to form the Rhône-Poulenc group. This was the group's apogee, which employed 115,000 people, including 75,000 in France. As a result of mergers and cross-holdings, Renaud Gillet, a descendant of the Gillet family, became vice-chairman and then chairman and CEO of the group. Textiles represented 63% of sales, but the corresponding industrial heritage was heterogeneous. The number of factories was significant and while some centers were relatively modern, particularly for nylon and polyester, others were more obsolete, especially for rayon. Once again, plants were closed or sold off, notably in Izieu, Arques-la-Bataille and Vaulx-en-Velin (the Tase plant in the Carré de soie district). Rhône-Poulenc also liquidated the land and property assets held around these divested plants: the housing and land of the workers' housing estates created between the wars.

In 1979 despite the closures and disposals, the economic situation of Rhône-Poulenc's textile branch remained worrying. A textile leading to a series of rayon plant closures at Roanne (France-Rayonne plant), Lyon-Vaise, etc. was drawn up. Also, a legal restructuring based on McKinsey's (the group's management advisor since 1969) recommendations was carried out. This restructuring meant that: activities were isolated in legal entities, which made it easier to identify their real profitability; they were then grouped into divisions corresponding to branches of activity (e.g. textiles), with these divisions being attached to the holding company. The holding company took long-term strategic decisions and the divisions implemented them, and employee representative bodies were limited to comparatively divided legal entities to embody the checks and balances.

In 1981 Cellatex was created for the rayon sector within Rhône-Poulenc's textile branch. Following closures, this sector was organized as a specific legal entity, with only two plants remaining: the Givet plant and the Grenoble plant. The company had a capital of one million francs, a workforce of 900 at the two sites, and estimated sales of around 250 million francs. It was headed by Marcel Charrin. Rhône-Poulenc Textile was restructured into three subsidiaries: Rhovyl, Cellatex and Rhône-Poulenc Fibres.

Nonetheless this rayon sector was part of a textile industry that no longer had the dynamism of previous decades. Innovation and ongoing research into new processes and products were in decline with a decrease on number of patents during the 1970s and 1980s. Another factor weighing on Cellatex's prospects was that its facilities were polluting and dangerous, both for the local population and for its employees. A plant like Givet was dangerous because of the toxic and explosive products it used. It polluted with zinc, hydrocarbons and volatile organic compounds. Still, since the Seveso disaster in Italy in 1976, public authorities and companies had become increasingly aware of their responsibilities with regard to chemical risks, and the Rhône-Poulenc group was no exception.

== Closure of the Grenoble plant ==
The decline of the textile industry in France, and the impact of successive economic crises after the Trente Glorieuses took its toll on this sector, which was no longer considered by the group to be a business with a future in France. Faced with increasingly fierce competition, the Rhône-Poulenc group adopted a strategy of retrenchment, hardly innovating and no longer renewing its industrial base, despite the concentration achieved. In 1989, after job cuts at both plants in previous years, it was decided to close the Grenoble plant. At 5 p.m. on 2 March, the last viscose yarn left the Isère looms. A redundancy plan was put in place, involving 130 transfers to other Rhône-Poulenc plants in France, including the Pont-de-Claix and Champagnier plants, 130 early retirements, 30 retraining and 72 voluntary redundancies.

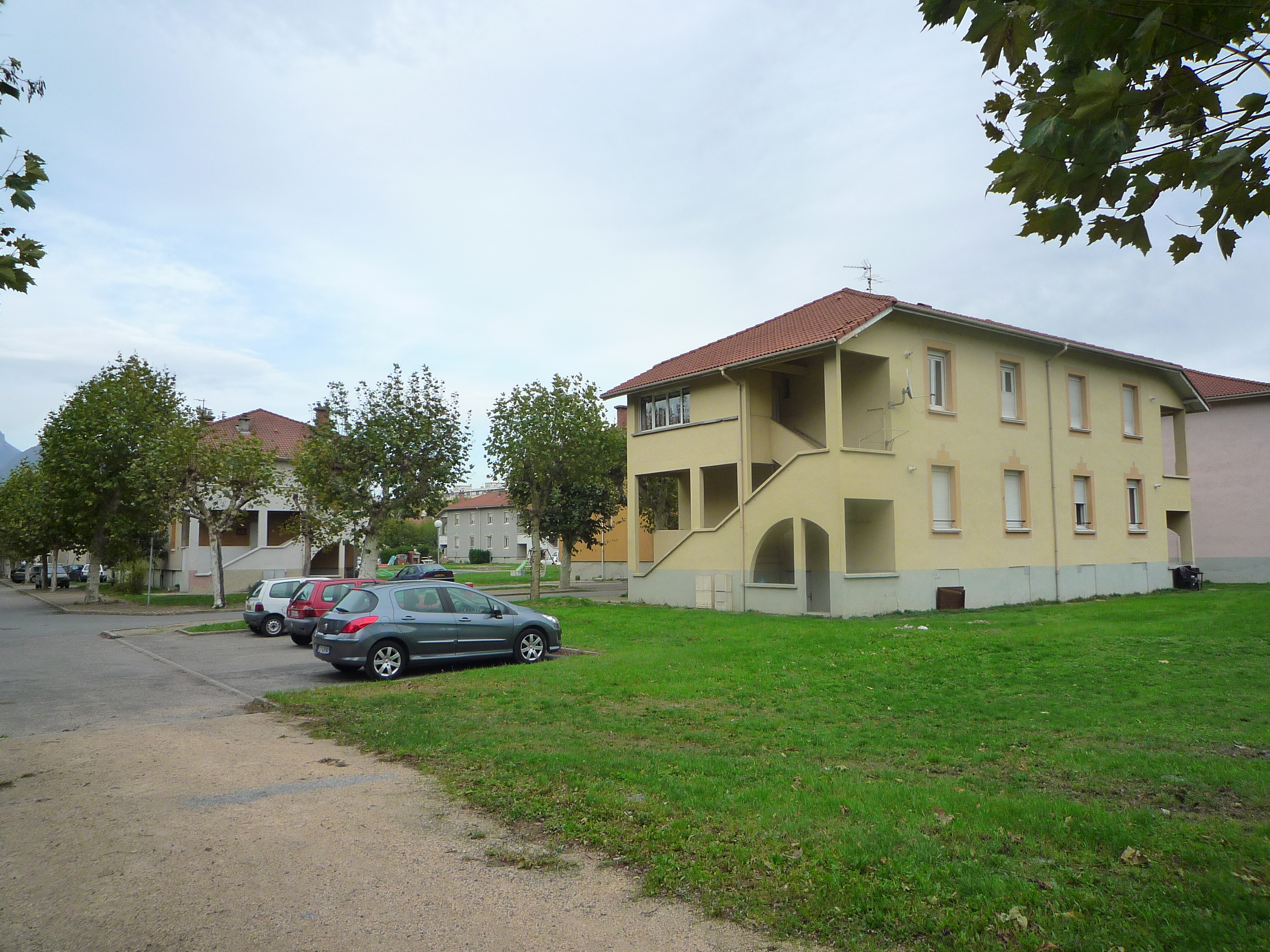
Cité de la viscose in Échirolles.

The plant was demolished in three stages. From March to August 1989 the chemicals were evacuated and the site cleaned up. Then, until April 1990, the machines were dismantled, and several of them moved to Givet. Finally, the buildings were demolished, finishing in June 1991. Rhône-Poulenc sold the land to a property development company. The workers' housing estates were rehabilitated, part sold to private individuals, part to the public office for development and construction of the Isère department. At the same time, in 1992, a Viscose Museum was inaugurated. This place of remembrance of a working-class history is located between the site of the former factory and one of the workers' housing estates founded to accommodate workers between the wars, the "Cité-jardin de la viscose", where some forty different nationalities, Hungarians, Poles, Italians, Armenians, Russians, Yugoslavs, Portuguese, Algerians, Turks, etc. were mixed together. (Note: The Grenoble viscose factory was set up in 1925 and 1926 by Gillet & associated, between Grenoble and a small rural commune, Échirolles. Today, the land is fully integrated into the Grenoble urban area.)

In 1982 the factory manager's house near the cité Viscose was bought by the commune of Échirolles and turned into a museum, the Musée Géo-Charles, dedicated to the sporting arts. The industrial site itself was used for the extension of a park and the establishment of a technopole. This technopole, called Technisud, was specifically designed for innovative, high-tech, non-polluting small and medium-sized businesses. Today, the technology park is home to a number of SMEs, particularly in the mechanical engineering sector, as well as a Rexel plant.

== Closure of the Givet plant ==
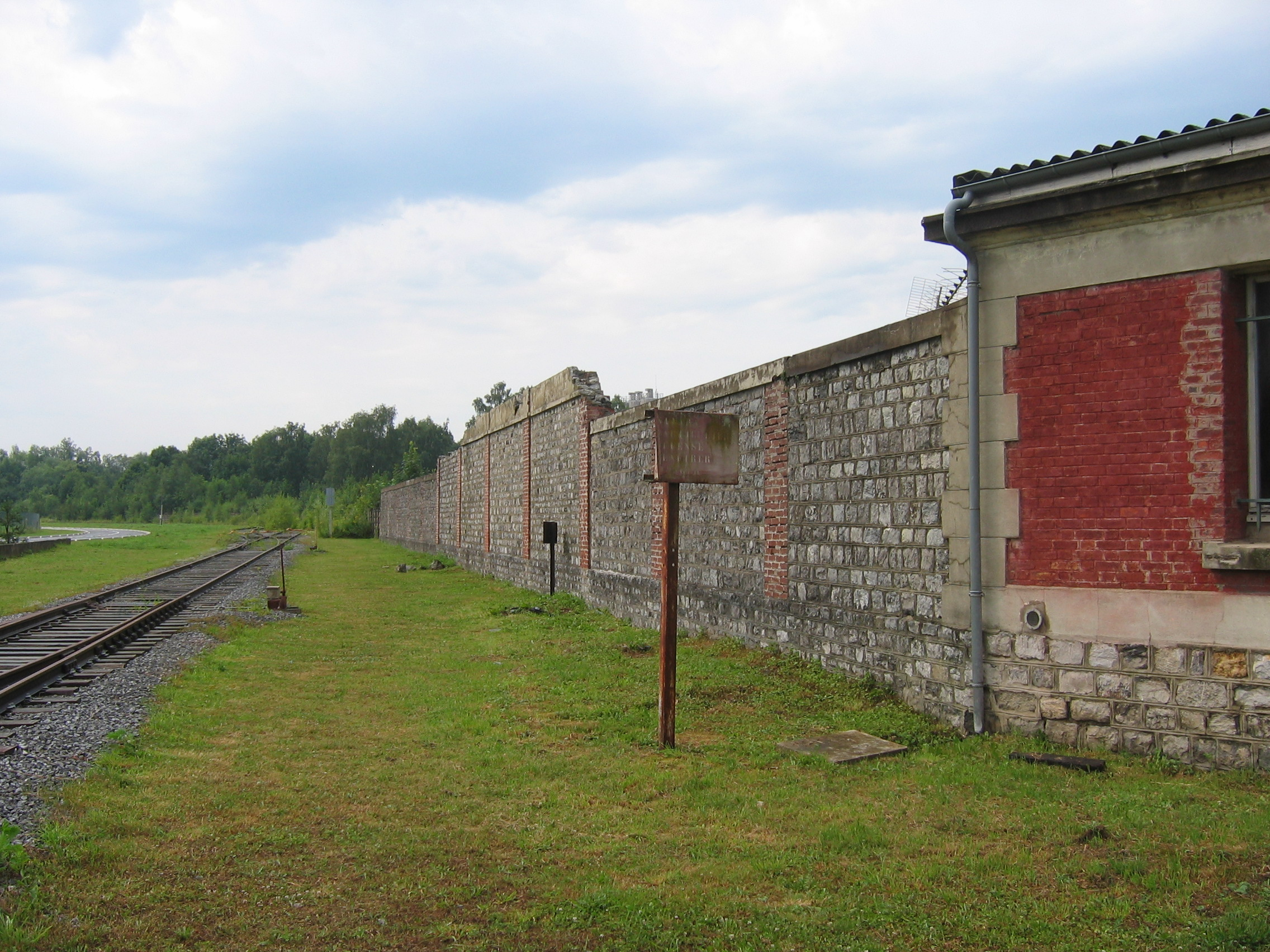
Facade of the Givet plant on the railroad side.

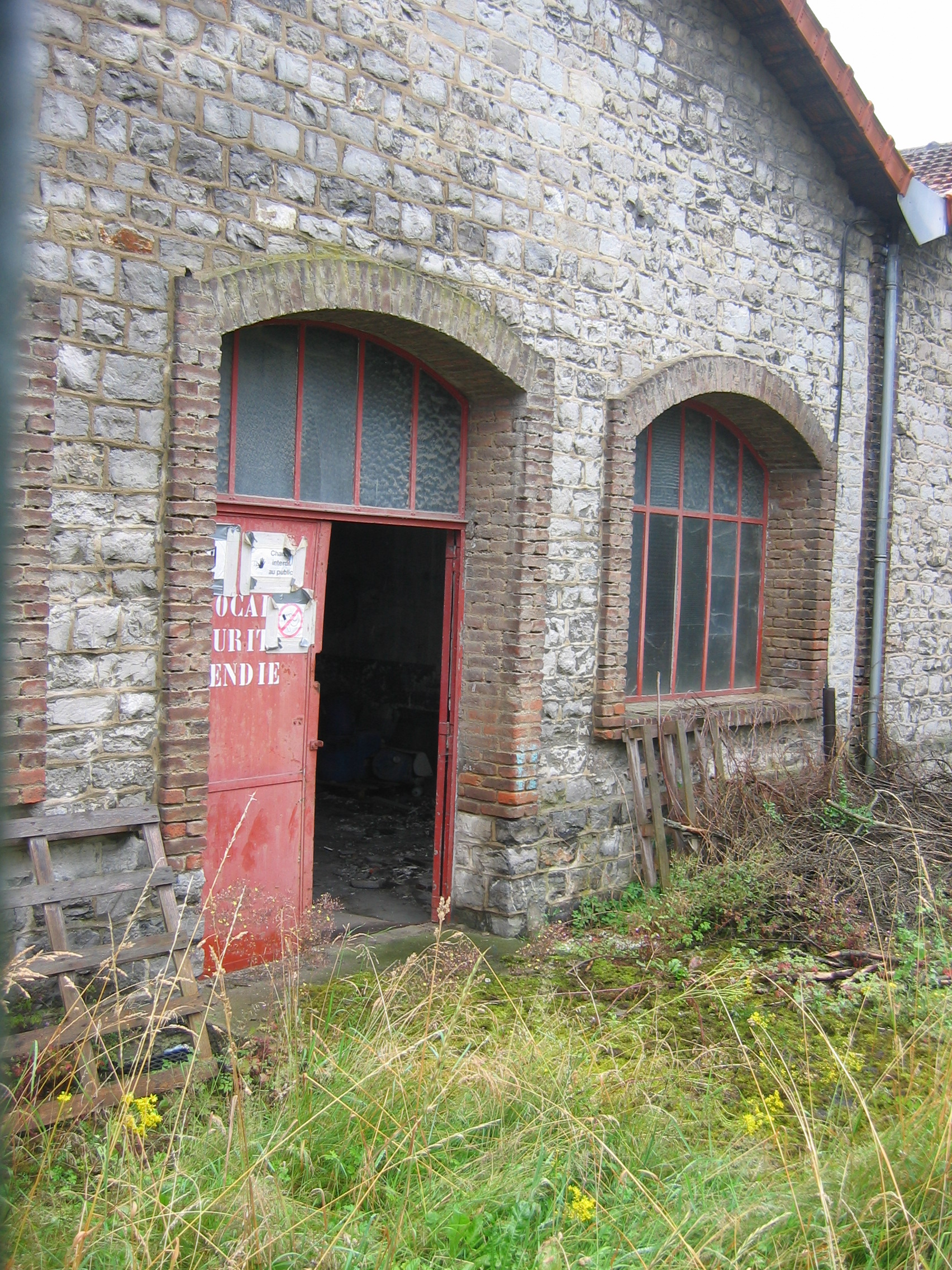
Givet facilities in 2012.

Rhône-Poulenc finally sold Cellatex in 1991. The Givet plant, the last remaining one, remained in operation, but went through a series of successive buyers and two floods of the Meuse, until it was acquired by the Austrian company Glansdorff. These buyers were interested in the markets still held by the company. The workforce continued to shrink, and by the time of its liquidation in July 2000, the plant had just 153 employees. It also lost its last patents, plundered by the buyers. It was the last rayon company, working from paper pulp, for eighteen plants in France operating this industrial sector twenty years earlier.

On 5 July 2000, with their employer nowhere to be found for almost a year, Cellatex employees were informed that their company had been declared bankrupt by the Charleville-Mézières Commercial Court. This announcement immediately triggered an occupation of the plant. This movement received considerable media coverage when the employees threatened to use the plant's stock of 46 tonnes of carbon disulphide. The plant was also stocked with 56,000 liters of sulfuric acid and 90 tons of strong soda ash. At the same time as the GIGN, the French media arrived on site in droves, along with the foreign media: Belgian, German, the Washington Post and CNN cameras. On 17 July, the employees dumped acid into the Meuse river, not enough to keep it in the drainage channels and avoid major pollution, but enough to show their determination, make an impression and keep up the pressure on the public authorities.

The act was criticized by a large part of the French political class, including those on the left, given that power at the time was held by the Socialist Party. Associated in a plural majority with the French Communist Party, the Radical Party of the Left, the Citizens' Movement and the Greens, it held both the legislative assembly and the executive, in a cohabitation involving the right-wing President of the Republic Jacques Chirac and the left-wing Prime Minister Lionel Jospin. Interior Minister Jean-Pierre Chevènement declared: "It is not acceptable that, whatever the difficult situation, employees should take the neighboring populations hostage, any more than the residents of the Meuse, in France, Belgium or Holland, by spilling sulfuric acid into the river". Robert Hue, leader of the French Communist Party, said he understood the workers' despair, but urged them not to cut themselves off from public opinion. Denis Baupin, national spokesman for the French Greens, also reacted: "Of course, we understand the despair of workers who are victims of the liberalization of the textile sector, but by destroying a river, the common property of all citizens, they are stepping outside the democratic expression of their demands". The French Minister for Employment and Solidarity, Martine Aubry, disagreed, stating that "the despair of men deserved to be heard", adding that action should be taken instead of making declarations. In the absence of the company's shareholder, who had disappeared, government departments, notably the teams of Jean-Claude Vacher, Prefect of the Ardennes, assisted by the Ministry of Labor and Solidarity, were on the front line in the search for solutions.

The final negotiations began at 5:30 pm on 19 July at the Ardennes prefecture, and lasted all night. The wait for the results of this "last chance meeting" was described by some media as "unbearable". The next day, the union representative submitted a memorandum of understanding to the workers, who accepted it. A proposed takeover by a Bavarian group was abandoned. "As a preamble to Wednesday evening's meeting, representatives of the Ministry told us that they considered the dossier to be insufficiently reliable", explained a spokesman for the former Cellatex employees. The employees no longer believed in miracle buyers or in the future of their profession.

The liquidation of Cellatex led to the implementation of a plan for the Ardennes and a project to revitalize the Givet employment area, with mediocre results. Ten years later, a third of the workforce remained unemployed, according to the outplacement firm responsible for helping them, and two-thirds according to data provided by the CGT. The buildings of the Givet plant appeared unchanged, but the communauté de communes Ardenne-Rives-de-Meuse acquired them with a view to welcoming companies. The land was cleaned up, having more than half of the 50,000 m2 of buildings, including the thermal power plant, razed in 2008. The roofs of the buildings were cleaned of asbestos and the 55 spinning machines were disposed of as scrap metal.

== See also ==
- Rayon

== Bibliography ==
Sorted by year of publication.

- Guéneau, Louis (1973) [1923]. Lyon et le commerce de la soie [Lyon and the silk trade] (in French). Ayer Publishing. ISBN 9780833714831.
- Fauquet, Louis Gustave (1960). Histoire de la rayonne et des textiles synthétiques [History of rayon and synthetic textiles] (in French). Armand Colin.
- Ricard, Patrice; Pelon, Jean-Louis; Silhol, Michel (1992). Mémoire de viscosiers : ils filaient la soie artificielle à Grenoble [Mémoire de viscosiers: they spun artificial silk in Grenoble] (in French). Grenoble: Presses universitaires de Grenoble. ISBN 2-7061-0460-0.
- Bernardy de Sigoyer, Michel; Boisgontier, Pierre (1996). La technopole : une certaine idée de la ville [The technopole: a certain idea of the city] (in French). Paris: Éditions L'Harmattan. pp. 113–116. ISBN 2-7384-4091-6.
- Barjot, Dominique; Cayez, Pierre (1998). "Brevets et conjoncture économique, le cas de Rhône-Poulenc". Les entreprises et leurs réseaux : hommes, capitaux, techniques et pouvoirs. Mélanges en l'honneur de François Caron [Les entreprises et leurs réseaux: hommes, capitaux, techniques et pouvoirs. Mélanges in honour of François Caron] (in French). Paris: Université Paris Sorbonne-Paris IV#Les Presses de l'université Paris-Sorbonne (PUPS). pp. 599–610. ISBN 9782840501220.
- Larose, Christian; Béroud, Sophie; Mouriaux, René; Rabhi, Maurad (2001). Cellatex : quand l'acide a coulé [Cellatex: when the acid ran out] (in French). Montreuil/Paris: Montreuil/Paris. ISBN 2-913165-44-3.
- Duchêne, François (2002). Industrialisation et territoire : Rhône-Poulenc et la construction sociale de l'agglomération roussillonnaise [Industrialization and territory: Rhône-Poulenc and the social construction of the Roussillon conurbation] (in French). Éditions L'Harmattan. ISBN 978-2-296-30222-8.
- Destrem, Pauline; Destrem, Dominique (2003). À la botte : la Bourse sous l'Occupation [Under the boot: the stock market under the Occupation] (in French). Lausanne: Éditions L'Âge d'Homme. p. 223. ISBN 2-8251-1758-7.
- Lemoine, Michel; Carly, Michel (2003). Les chemins belges de Simenon [Simenon's Belgian roads] (in French). Éditions du Céfal. p. 66. ISBN 2-87130-127-1.
- Marais, Christian (2005). L'âge du plastique : Découvertes et utilisations [The age of plastic: discoveries and uses] (in French). Éditions L'Harmattan. ISBN 9782296577237.
- Boullet, Daniel (2006). Entreprises et environnement en France de 1960 à 1990 : Les chemins d'une prise de conscience [Business and the environment in France from 1960 to 1990: The path to awareness] (in French). Genève: Librairie Droz. p. 506. ISBN 2-600-01075-0.
- Pernot, François (2007). "Les crises de la soie". Les routes de la soie [Silk Roads] (in French). Paris: Éditions Artémis. pp. 185–187. ISBN 978-2-84416-654-8.
- Bennani, Maya; Decrock, Bruno; Griot, François; Marasi, Julien (2009). "Filature La Soie artificielle, puis Compagnie Industrielle des Textiles Artificiels et Synthétiques, puis Rhône-Poulenc, puis Cellatex" [Filature La Soie artificielle, then Compagnie Industrielle des Textiles Artificiels et Synthétiques, then Rhône-Poulenc, then Cellatex]. Patrimoine industriel des Ardennes [Industrial heritage of the Ardennes] (in French). Éditions Dominique Guéniot. pp. 123–124. ISBN 978-2-87825-458-7. Archived from the original on 4 May 2010.
- Lambert-Dansette, Jean (2009). Histoire de l'entreprise et des chefs d'entreprise en France : L'entreprise entre deux siècles (1880–1914), Première partie, Les rayons et les ombres (in French). Vol. 5. Éditions L'Harmattan. ISBN 978-2-296-09302-7.

=== Journal and newspaper articles ===
- Rédaction MI (20 August 1922). "La Reconstitution des Régions dévastées : Les Ardennes 1918-1922. La Soie Artificielle à Givet" [Reconstituting devastated regions: The Ardennes 1918–1922. Artificial silk in Givet]. Le Monde illustré (in French). 8: 85–87.
- Guéneau, Louis (1928). "La production et la consommation de la soie artificielle dans le monde" [Artificial silk production and consumption worldwide]. Annales de géographie (in French). 37 (128): 481–489. doi:10.3406/geo.1928.9480.
- Backmann, Michèle; Cottin, Christine (March 1973). "A qui appartient la France ?" [Who owns France?]. L'Unité (in French) (55): 20–23.
- Backmann, René; Giesbert, Franz-Olivier (23 January 1978). "Quand Rhône-Poulenc dégraisse" (PDF). Le Nouvel Observateur: 37.
- Rédaction AC (1981). "Nouvelles de Rhône-Poulenc" [News from Rhône-Poulenc]. L'Actualité chimique (in French).
- Carlioz, Pierre; Chabert, Louis (1982). "Déprise industrielle et stratégies spatiales : la fermeture de R.P.T. Vaulx-en-Velin dans l'est de l'agglomération lyonnaise". Revue de géographie de Lyon. Hors-Série L'usine dans la ville / Journées de la Commission de géographie industrielle, Lyon et Saint-Étienne, 23–24 octobre 1981: 45–64.
- Mathiot, Cédric (2000a). "Givet : la filature au bout du rouleau" [Givet: the spinning mill at the end of its rope]. Libération (in French). mathiot14072000.
- Ambrosi, Pascal (2000a). "Léger apaisement dans le conflit de l'usine Cellatex à Givet" [Slight easing in the dispute at the Cellatex plant in Givet]. Les Échos (in French) (18194): 22. ambrosi17072000.
- Mathiot, Cédric (2000b). "Les pouvoirs publics sont responsables" [Public authorities are responsible]. Libération. mathiot18072000.
- Mathiot, Cédric (2000c). "Alchimie réussie à Givet" [Successful chemistry in Givet]. Libération. mathiot19072000.
- Lebègue, Thomas (19 July 2000). "Casse-tête pour les Verts" [A headache for the Greens]. Libération.
- Aubé, Claire (20 July 2000). "" L'après-conflit, je n'ose même pas y penser " Myriam, salariée de Cellatex depuis vingt-neuf ans Givet (Ardennes)" ["I don't even dare think about the post-conflict period" Myriam, Cellatex employee for twenty-nine years Givet (Ardennes)]. Le Parisien.
- Ambrosi, Pascal (2000b). "Les salariés de Cellatex approuvent le protocole d'accord" [Cellatex employees approve memorandum of understanding]. Les Échos (in French) (18198): 23 – via ambrosi21072000.
- Nouaillas, Olivier (27 July 2000). "Cellatex un sulfureux gâchis" [Cellatex: a sulfurous mess]. La Vie (in French) (2865): 23. Archived from the original on 3 March 2016.
- Ambrosi, Pascal (19 January 2001). "150 millions de francs pour un " plan Ardennes "" [150 million francs for an "Ardennes plan"]. Les Échos (in French) (18324): 32.
- Doumayrou, Fanny (7 April 2001). "Les Cellatex toujours sur le carreau" [Cellatex still on the sidelines]. L'Humanité (in French).
- Joly, Hervé (1 June 2002). "La soie, fibre du libre-échange" [Silk, the fiber of free trade]. L'Expansion (in French).
- Rédaction L'Union (12 May 2008). "Dépollution de Cellatex : les grandes manœuvres" [Cellatex decontamination: the big moves]. L'Union (in French).
- Jeannot, Arlyne (27 July 2010). "Cellatex : un héritage doux et amer" [Cellatex: a bitter-sweet legacy]. L'Union (in French).
- Saubaber, Delphine (5 May 2012). "Plans sociaux : la vie d'après" [Redundancy plans: life afterwards]. L'Express (in French).

=== Archives ===
- C., Deschin (2017), La mémoire d’une entreprise textile givetoise : le fonds de l’usine Cellatex de Givet aux Archives départementales des Ardennes [, Entreprises et histoire, 2, 174–181, résumé

=== Web files ===
- Daviet, Jean-Pierre (1991). "L'industrie chimique française au tournant de la seconde industrialisation (1860–1939)" [The French chemical industry at the turn of the second industrial era (1860–1939)] (PDF) (in French). secondeindus. Archived from the original (PDF) on 17 August 2017.
- Musée de la viscose (2012). "Musée de la viscose". Le site du conseil général de l'Isère (in French). musee.
- Société chimique de France website, a contribution to the industrial history of polymers
  - Michel, Jean-Marie (2000a). "La viscose. Application technique : la rayonne" [Viscose. Technical application: rayon] (PDF). SCF (in French). SCF01. Archived from the original (PDF) on 3 September 2014.
  - Michel, Jean-Marie (2000b). "RVA-PROGIL. Le groupe Gillet" [RVA-PROGIL. The Gillet Group] (PDF). SCF (in French). SCF03. Archived from the original (PDF) on 1 February 2014.
  - Michel, Jean-Marie (2000c). "Rhône-Poulenc (S.C.U.R.-S.C.U.R.P.)" (PDF). SCF (in French). SCF04. Archived from the original (PDF) on 17 July 2013.
  - Michel, Jean-Marie (2000d). "Usines textiles de viscose en France" [Textile viscose plants in France] (PDF). SCF (in French). SCF04. Archived from the original (PDF) on 26 November 2013.
  - Michel, Jean-Marie (2000e). "Des industries de la nitrocellulose aux industries des polymères de synthèse" [From nitrocellulose to synthetic polymers] (PDF). SCF (in French). SCF04. Archived from the original (PDF) on 26 October 2015.

=== Filmography ===
- The closure of Cellatex, the occupation and the blackmail of the chemical risk gave rise to a TV film by Maurice Failevic titled Jusqu'au bout, produced in 2005, presentation on the Arte website.
- "Usine Cellatex Givet" [Cellatex Givet plant]. INA (in French). 17 July 2000.
- "Suite du conflit usine Cellatex Givet" [Cellatex Givet plant dispute continues]. INA (in French). 18 July 2000.
