= Échirolles =

Échirolles Ècherôles (Arpitan)
- Commune
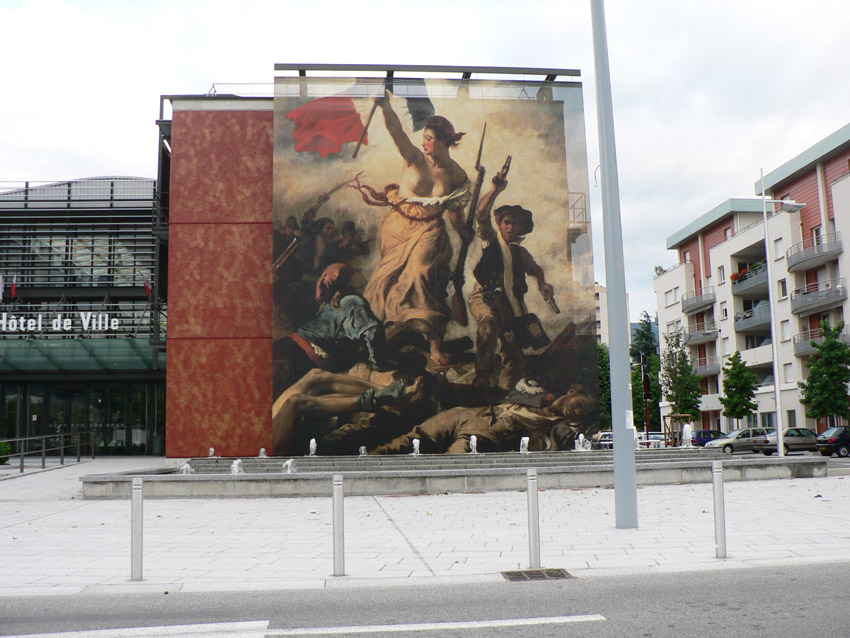
- The Hôtel de Ville with Eugène Delacroix's Liberty Leading the People reproduced on its façade

- Coat of arms
- Location of Échirolles
- Location within France Location within Auvergne-Rhône-Alpes
- Coordinates: 45°08′37″N 5°43′06″E
- Country: France
- Region: Auvergne-Rhône-Alpes
- Department: Isère
- Arrondissement: Grenoble
- Canton: Échirolles
- Intercommunality: Grenoble-Alpes Métropole

Government
  - Mayor (2023–2026): Amandine Demore
- Area^{1}: 8 km^{2} (3.1 sq mi)
- Elevation: 237 m (778 ft)
- Highest elevation: 395 m (1,296 ft)
- Lowest elevation: 217 m (712 ft)
- Population (2023): 37,491
  - Density: 4,700/km^{2} (12,000/sq mi)
- Time zone: UTC+01:00 (CET)
  - Summer (DST): UTC+02:00 (CEST)
- INSEE/Postal code: 38151 /38130
- ^{1} French Land Register data, which excludes lakes, ponds, glaciers > 1 km^{2} (0.386 sq mi or 247 acres) and river estuaries.

Échirolles (French pronunciation: [eʃiʁɔl]; Arpitan: Ècherôles) is a commune in the Isère department, southeastern France. Part of the Grenoble urban unit (agglomeration), it is the second-largest suburb of the city of Grenoble, which is immediately to its north.

== History ==
A former industrial village had the majority of its inhabitants work in the viscose factories, a fabric that was invented in Échirolles in 1884 by the French scientist and industrial Hilaire de Chardonnet, before becoming universally famous. The process for manufacturing viscose was then patented by three British scientists, Charles Frederick Cross, Edward John Bevan and Clayton Beadle, in 1891.

The Hôtel de Ville was completed in 2006.

== Population ==
Historical population

Year	Pop.	±% p.a.
1836	735	—
1841	702	−0.91%
1846	715	+0.37%
1851	639	−2.22%
1856	634	−0.16%
1861	615	−0.61%
1866	642	+0.86%
1872	652	+0.26%
1876	682	+1.13%
1881	619	−1.92%
1886	679	+1.87%
1891	633	−1.39%
1896	600	−1.07%
1901	574	−0.88%
1906	582	+0.28%
1911	572	−0.35%

Year	Pop.	±% p.a.
1921	597	+0.43%
1926	838	+7.02%
1931	2,765	+26.97%
1936	2,520	−1.84%
1946	2,825	+1.15%
1954	3,762	+3.65%
1962	7,111	+8.28%
1968	15,429	+13.78%
1975	33,288	+11.61%
1982	37,360	+1.66%
1990	34,435	−1.01%
1999	32,806	−0.54%
2007	35,383	+0.95%
2012	35,826	+0.25%
2017	36,840	+0.56%
2023	37,491	+0.29%

Source: EHESS and INSEE (1968–2023)

=== Criminality ===
Located just next to Grenoble, Échirolles doesn't escapes to the growth of criminality, especially since the 2020s. It is mainly related to drug traffic.

==== 2023 ====
Two men are hit by bullet at Échirolles and Le-Pont-de-Claix, on 21 August.

==== 2024 ====
In August, France 3 Rhône-Alpes says that "a new shooting happened at Échirolles, the seventh one in less than two weeks." A month later, a whole building is evacuated due to "the massive drug traffic exposing its inhabitants to huge and immediate danger".

==== 2025 ====
This new year did not start better: on the evening of 4 January, at 23:30, a new shooting occurred. A teenage girl, walking with another teenager, and her dog, was hit on the leg. She says few days later to the newspaper Le Parisien that she will have to "live with a bullet into the leg for the rest of [her] life".

A few months after, in April, a new shooting happens. The next month, on May, as well as Grenoble and Saint-Martin-d'Hères, Échirolles is one more time under criminal shootings.

In December 2025, two killings occurred: in the night, from 2 to 3 of December, at Georges-Meliès street, and died just after emergency services found him. Few days after, the 6 of December, at 11PM, another one, 22 years old, located 8 May 1945 Avenue, took in charge by emergency services, died at hospital shortly after; at the same evening, nearby of Échirolles, at La Bruyère park of Grenoble, another man, 18 years old, died by bullet the same night. Both were harmed by at least several bullet injuries, probably due to drug traffic, says France Bleu.

== Personalities ==
- Thernand Bakouboula, footballer
- Seynabou Benga, handball player
- Stephane Biakolo, footballer
- Talel Chedly (b. 1978), footballer
- Vincent Clerc (b. 1981), rugby footballer of Stade Toulousain and of the France national team.
- Mélissa Theuriau (b. 1978), journalist and television producer.
- Calogero (b. 1971), pop/rock singer, composer and songwriter.
- Laure Péquegnot (b. 1975), skier
- David di Tommaso (1979–2005), football player.
- Sami Bouajila (b. 1966), actor.
- Guilbaut Colas (b. 18 June 1983), freestyle skier.
- David Lazzaroni (b. 4 February 1985), ski jumper.
- Sandrine Aubert (b. 6 October 1982), alpine skier.
- Jonathan Tinhan (b. 1 June 1989), footballer.
- Kévin Aymoz (b. 1 August 1997), figure skater

== International relations ==
Échirolles is twinned with:

- Grugliasco, Italy
- Honhoue, Benin
- Kimberley, England

== See also ==
- Musée Géo-Charles
- Cellatex
