= Hôtel de Ville, Échirolles =

Town hall in Échirolles, France

Hôtel de Ville
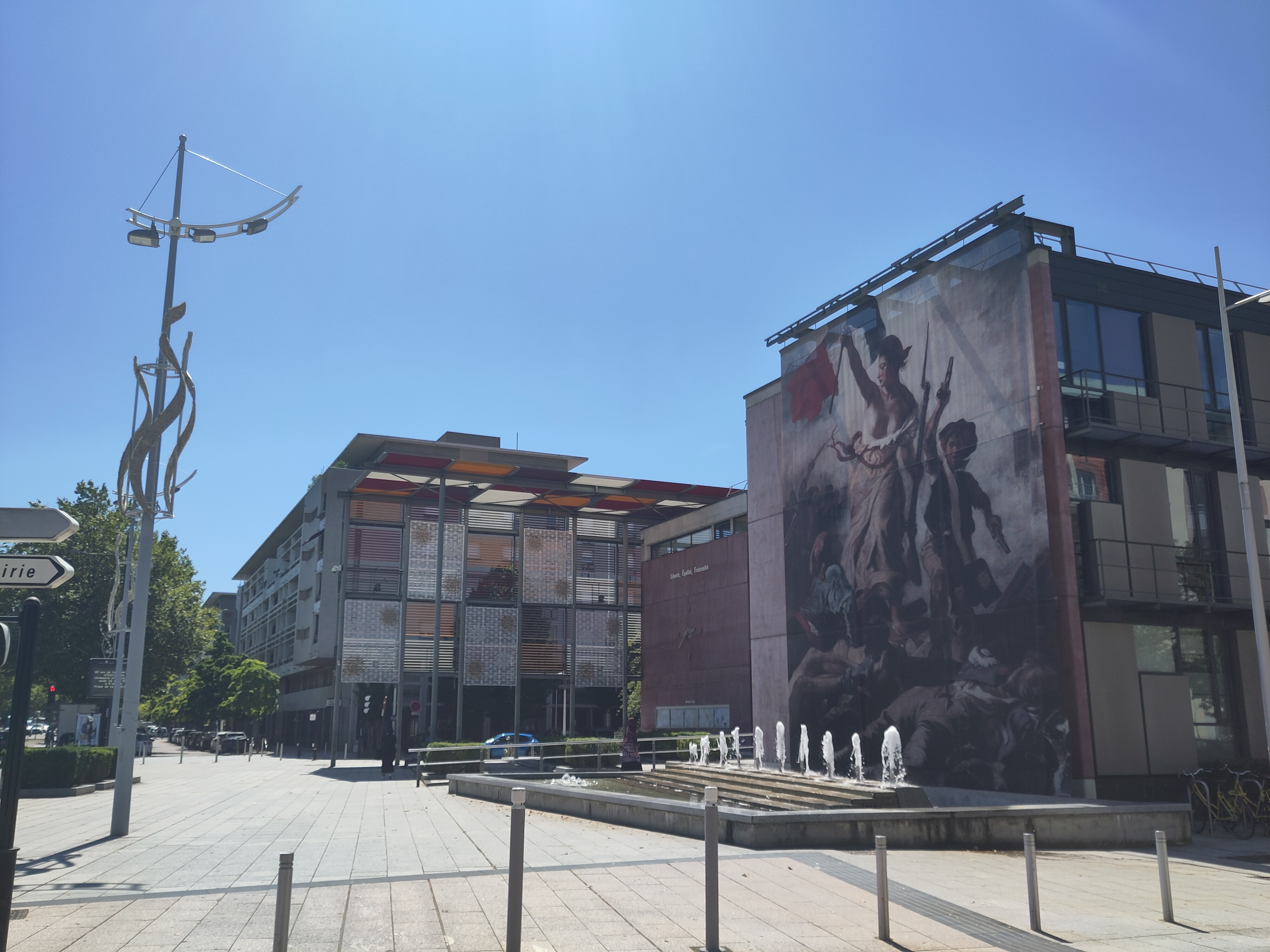
- The main frontage of the Hôtel de Ville in August 2024
- Interactive map of the Hôtel de Ville area

General information
- Type: City hall
- Architectural style: Modern style
- Location: Échirolles, France
- Coordinates: 45.1483°N 5.7168°E
- Completed: 1996

Design and construction
- Architect: Arcane Architectes

The Hôtel de Ville (French pronunciation: [otɛl də vil], City Hall) is a municipal building in Échirolles, Isère, in southeastern France, standing on Avenue du 8 Mai 1945.

== History ==
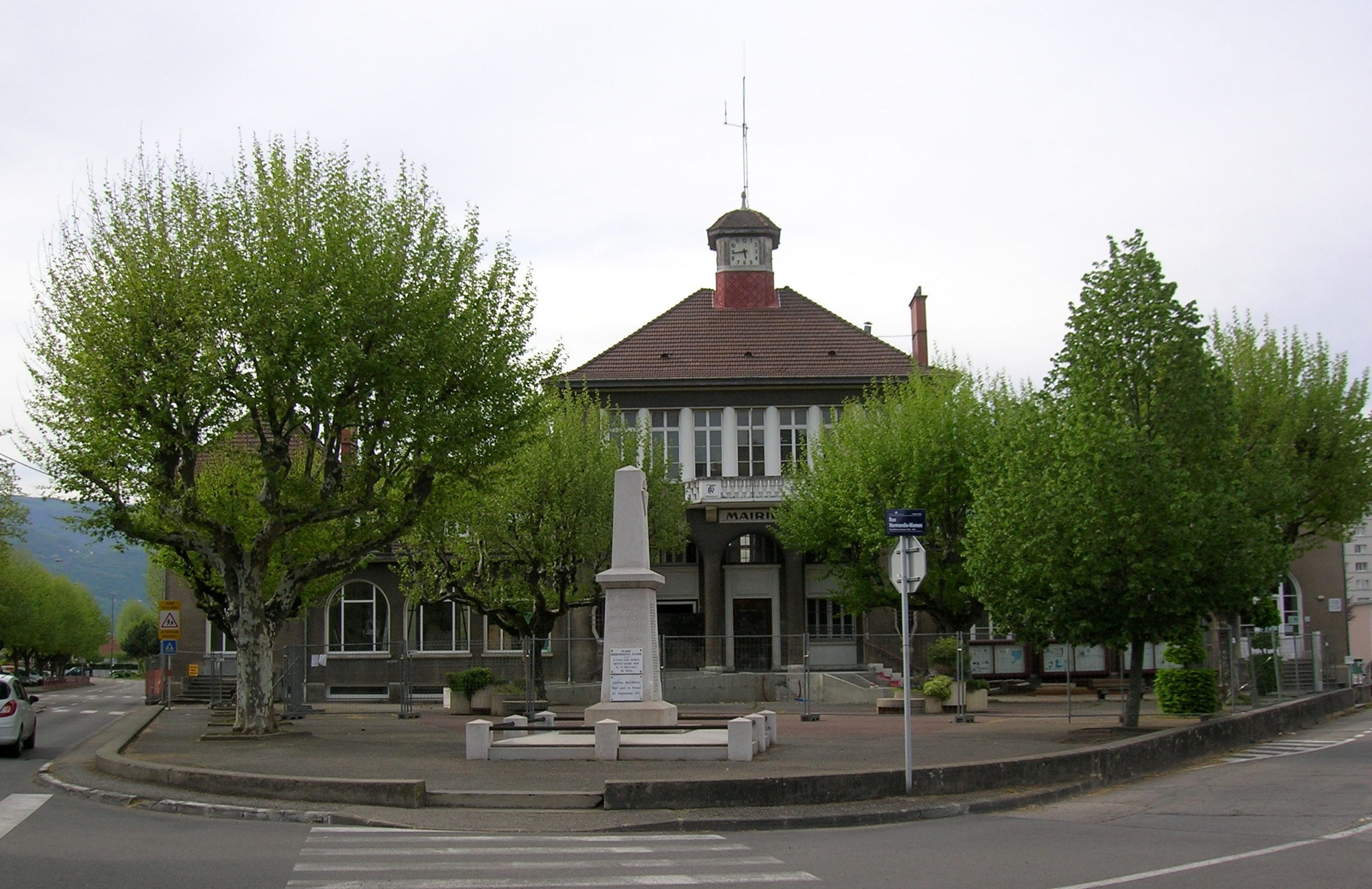
The second town hall

After the town of Échirolles was recognised as a separate commune in 1833, the new council established its first town hall, which also served as a school, in the old town centre. However, in the early 1930s, following significant industrial growth, the council led by the mayor, André Delachanal, decided to commission a new building to replace the earlier structure which had become dilapidated and cramped. Construction of the new building, the second town hall, began in 1934. It was designed in the Art Deco style, built in brick with a cement render finish and was completed in 1937.

The second town hall was laid out in three parts, with the town hall and post office in the central block, the girls' school in the left-hand wing and the boys' school in the right-hand wing. The design involved a symmetrical main frontage of 13 bays facing onto Place de la Libération. The central block of five bays featured three round headed openings on the ground floor with oculi in the outer bays. The central opening contained a square-headed doorway surmounted by a panel and a Diocletian window, while the other two bays contained bi-partite windows surmounted by panels and Diocletian windows. On the first floor, there was a row of nine closely set casement windows and a balustraded balcony and, at roof level, there was a small clock tower. The wings of three bays each, which were single-storey, were fenestrated by round headed windows, while the end bays were fenestrated by round headed windows on the ground floor and by casement windows with shutters on the first floor. After the council vacated the building, it was used to accommodate community organisations, and was then converted for use as the Centre du Graphisme (Centre for Graphic Design) in November 2016.

In the early 1990s, following further population growth, the council led by the mayor, Gilbert Biessy, decided to commission a modern town hall. The site they selected, on the west side of Avenue du 8 Mai 1945, was in the new commercial centre of the town. The new building was designed by Arcane Architectes in the modern style, built in concrete and glass and was completed in 2006.

The design involved an asymmetrical main frontage of three sections facing onto Avenue du 8 Mai 1945. The central section featured a three-storey glass atrium with a curved roof, while the outer sections were projected forward and clad in red stone. The right-hand section was decorated with a huge canvas displaying the painting Liberty Leading the People by the artist, Eugène Delacroix. The canvas was replaced in 2012 and again in 2020 to maintain the strength of the fabric and the vibrancy of the colours. Internally, the principal room was the Salle du Conseil (council chamber). The archive store was reorganised, to create a workshop and a meeting room, in 2021.
