= Musée Géo-Charles =

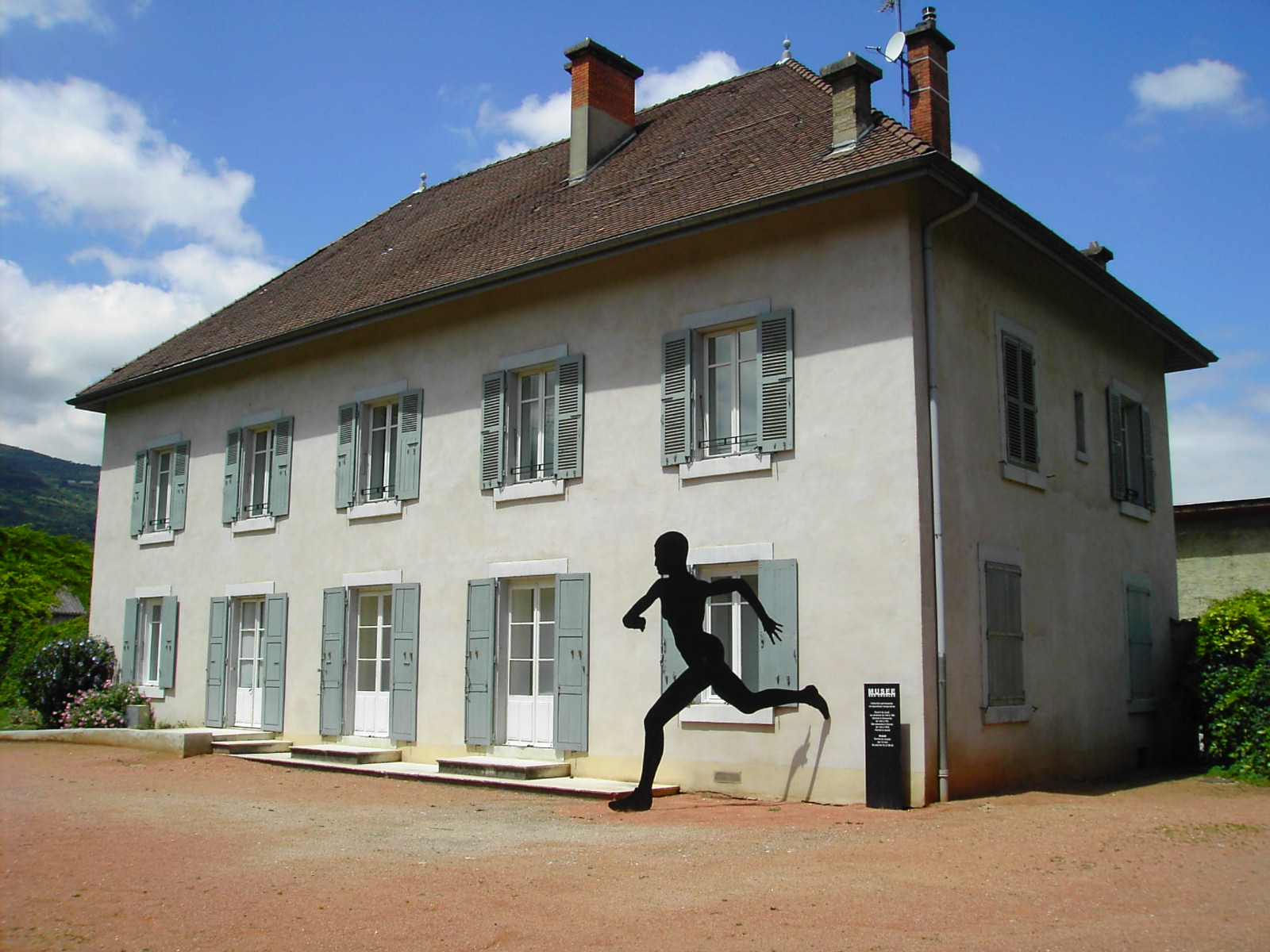
- Established: 1982
- Location: 1 rue Géo-Charles, 38130 Échirolles, France
- Coordinates: 45.1493°N 5.6995°E
- Type: Art museum

The Musée Géo-Charles is a museum located in Échirolles, near Grenoble, France.

== Origin ==
The museum is home to some of the personal collection of the poet Géo-Charles. It was established by the city of Échirolles in 1982, and was installed in an old mansion that belonged to the Société de la Viscose.

Since March 1, 2021, the Musée Géo-Charles has joined the TRACé (Territoire Ressources, Arts et Culture Échirolles), an EPA which also administers the Viscose Museum and the Graphic Design Center, both located in Échirolles.

== Collection ==
The museum houses the collections and archives received as a gift from Lucienne Géo-Charles, from the personal collection of her husband. These collections particularly show the works of the first half of the 20th century, the School of Paris. There are paintings, sculptures, prints of artists who were close to Géo-Charles, including André Derain, Delaunay, Fernand Léger and Frans Masereel. Most of the works presented are related to sports as subjects of art.

There are often temporary exhibitions. Several developments of the museum are planned.

== See also ==
- Cellatex
