= Talel Chedly =

French football striker (born 1978)

Personal information
- Date of birth: 21 April 1978 (age 48)
- Place of birth: Echirolles, France
- Height: 1.74 m (5 ft 9 in)
- Position: Forward

Senior career*
Years	Team	Apps	(Gls)
1998–2005	Meyrin		
2005–2008	Servette FC	70	(24)
2008–2009	FC Baulmes		
- * Club domestic league appearances and goals

Talel Chedly (born 21 April 1978) is a French footballer who played as a striker.

== See also ==
- Football in Switzerland
- List of football clubs in Switzerland
