= Carnot family =

French family

- Arms of Lazare-Nicolas-Marguerite Carnot
- Place of origin: Burgundy
- Founded: 16th century
- Current head: Gaëtan Carnot
- Distinctions: Legion of Honour

The Carnot family (English: /kɑːrˈnoʊ/ kar-NOH, French: [kaʁno]) is an old French family of Burgundian origin, still extant.

Members of this family distinguished themselves starting from the French Revolution. Politicians included Lazare Carnot, who was president of the National Convention and member of the Committee of Public Safety, as well as a general and peer of France, Sadi Carnot, who was President of the French Republic under the Third Republic, two ministers, and four generations of deputies. A jurist, Joseph Carnot, was a counselor at the Court of Cassation. A scientist, Sadi Carnot, a physicist, gave his name to the Carnot-Clausius principle.

== History ==
The Carnot family, originating in the village of Épertully (Saône-et-Loire), where it has been present since at least the 15th century..., was for a time Calvinist. Its members held, under the Ancien Régime, from the 16th century, the professions of merchant and notary.

In the 19th century, the Carnot family included several notable figures, including the physicist Sadi Carnot (1796–1832), Hippolyte Carnot (1801–1888), Minister of Public Instruction in 1848, who founded the École d'administration to train government administrators, and Sadi Carnot (1837–1894), President of the French Republic under the Third Republic, assassinated.

Today, the Carnot family is represented by Gaëtan Carnot (born 1938) and his family, who created the Fondation Carnot in 1996 to encourage scientific research through scholarships and to preserve the family's memory.

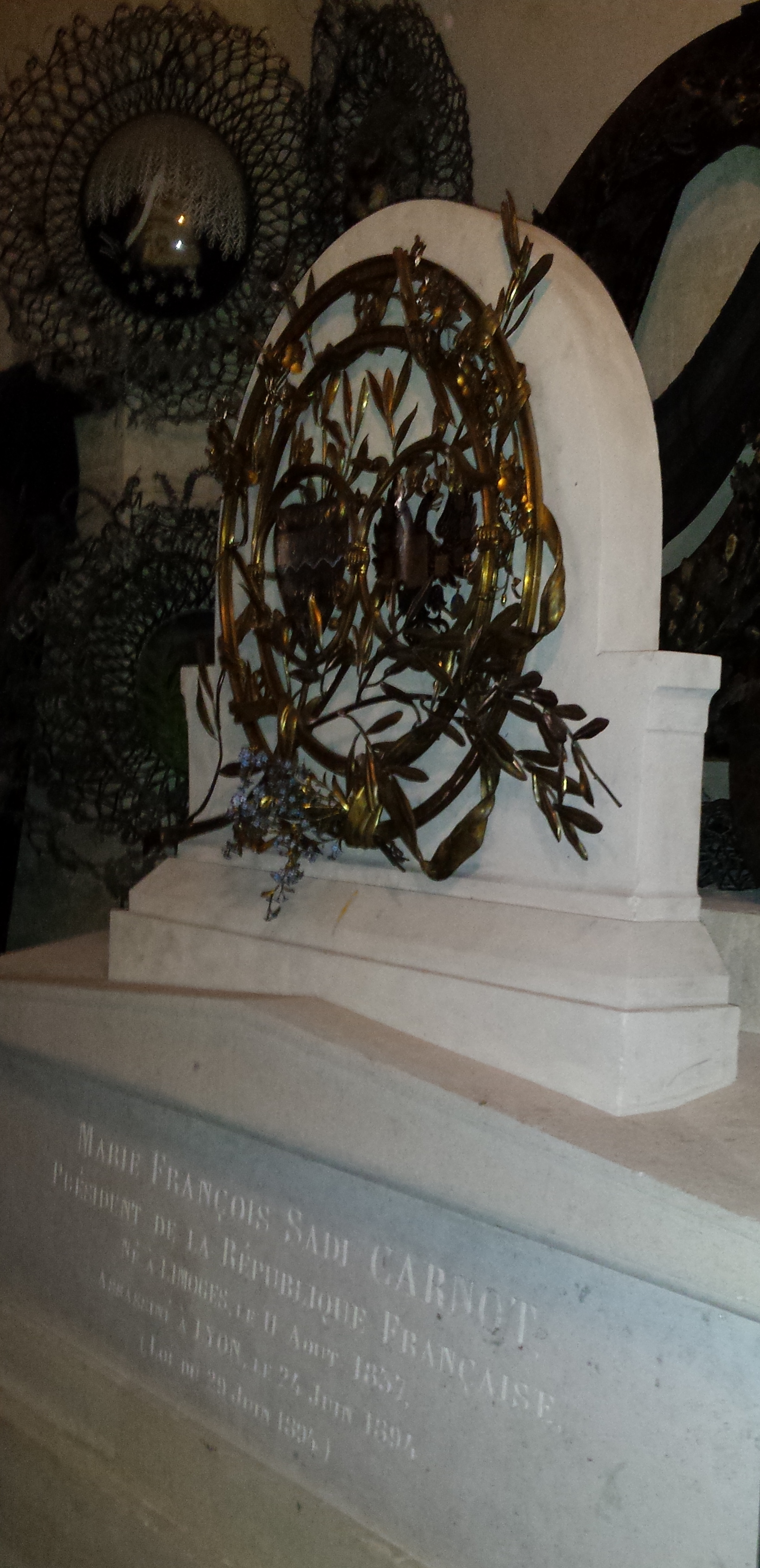
The tomb of Sadi Carnot at the Panthéon, Paris

== Notable figures ==
- Lazare Nicolas Marguerite Carnot, known as Le Grand Carnot (born 13 May 1753 in Nolay, died 2 August 1823 in Magdeburg), multiple times deputy during the French Revolution, voted for the death of King Louis XVI in 1793, member of the Committee of Public Safety (1793–1794) during the War in the Vendée, president of the National Convention (1794). When the Committee of Public Safety decided in 1794 to create a central public works school, he supported and participated in the project that led to the future École polytechnique with Jacques-Élie Lamblardie and Gaspard Monge. Threatened with arrest after Thermidor, he was definitively saved on 9 prairial year III (28 May 1795) by François Louis Bourdon or Lanjuinais, who presented him as the one who organized the victory of the Republic's armies. Following them, the Thermidorians claimed he had focused exclusively on military operations within the Committee of Public Safety, attributed the greatest share of the French armies' successes to him, and nicknamed him the "organizer of victory". He later became a director (1795–1797) during the Directory; during the Hundred Days, he was made a general of division, peer of France, and Grand Cross of the Legion of Honour, Minister of the Interior in 1815. He was created Count Carnot and of the Empire on 20 March 1815, although "General Carnot [...] never used this title of count and did not withdraw the letters patent from the Chancery." Philippe du Puy de Clinchamps writes that this title appears in the decree appointing Lazare Carnot as Minister of the Interior, but "the letters patent were neither issued nor registered, and there was no creation of a majorat". He authored the work Essai général sur les machines (Paris, 1783).
- Nicolas Léonard Sadi Carnot (born 1 June 1796 in Paris, died 24 August 1832 in Paris), physicist, son of Lazare Carnot and uncle of President Sadi Carnot. In 1824, he scientifically analyzed the efficiency of steam engines and established the second law of thermodynamics. He published the first two principles of this new science. His work, little understood by his contemporaries, was later popularized by Rudolf Clausius under the name Carnot-Clausius principle. He authored the work Réflexions sur la puissance motrice du feu et sur les machines propres à développer cette puissance.
- Lazare Hippolyte Carnot (born 5 April 1801 in Saint-Omer, died 16 March 1888 in Paris), Minister of Public Instruction in 1848. Founded the École d'administration to train government administrators (short-lived but a precursor to the ENA). He increased teachers' salaries, requiring them to "teach children the virtues of the democratic Republic". In a famous legislative proposal, he was the first to call for compulsory and free primary education for both sexes. Teachers would receive three years of training at a normal school with a guaranteed minimum salary. This proposal was overshadowed by the Falloux Law of 1850, but several of its provisions were later adopted by the Falloux and especially Ferry laws of 1880: Carnot's proposal even included a provision guaranteeing educational freedom. Defeated in the 1849 legislative elections, Carnot regained his seat in a by-election in 1850 and was one of the deputies who opposed the coup d'état of Louis-Napoleon Bonaparte on 2 December 1851, refusing to swear allegiance to him. Elected again (as a senator), he died in Paris on 16 March 1888.
- Marie François Sadi Carnot (born 11 August 1837 in Limoges, assassinated 25 June 1894 in Lyon), son of Hippolyte Carnot and nephew of the physicist Sadi Carnot, married to Marie Pauline Cécile Carnot (née Dupont-White) (20 July 1841 in Paris – 30 September 1898 in Cerny). A graduate of Polytechnique and the École des Ponts et Chaussées, graduating top of his class in 1863, a senior civil servant, he was a deputy of Côte-d'Or, prefect of Seine-Inférieure, Minister of Public Works, and Minister of Finance in 1885. Elected President of the Republic on 3 December 1887 following the resignation of Jules Grévy due to the 1887 decorations scandal, his early presidency was marked by Boulangist agitation and the Panama scandal in 1892. In a context of extreme unrest following the so-called scélérates laws, Sadi Carnot was stabbed by the Italian anarchist Sante Geronimo Caserio on 24 June 1894 during the Exposition internationale et coloniale. He died of his wounds shortly after midnight on 25 June 1894.
- Marie Adolphe Carnot (born 27 January 1839 in Paris, died 21 June 1920 in Paris), brother of the president, chemist, geologist, president of the Charente General Council, president of the Society for the Encouragement of National Industry, president of the French Society of Mineralogy and Crystallography, one of the founders of the Democratic Alliance in 1901 and its president until 1920.
- Lazare Hippolyte Sadi Carnot (1865–1948), son of the former, colonel, writer.
- Claude Ernest Jean Carnot (1866–1955), brother of the former, general councilor, deputy of Côte-d'Or.
- Adolphe Léon François Carnot (1872–1960), brother of Ernest Carnot, general councilor, deputy, president of Arts Décoratifs.
- Lazare Adolphe Paul Carnot (born 16 November 1869 in Limoges, died 1 April 1957 in Paris), physician, professor at the Paris Faculty of Medicine, member of the Academy of Medicine. The Hôtel Paul Carnot on the Champ-de-Mars (Avenue Élisée-Reclus) was built by the brothers Auguste and Gustave Perret based on plans by his brother-in-law Paul Guadet
- Jean Paulin Hippolyte Carnot (13 July 1881 in Paris – 24 April 1969 in Paris), son of Adolphe and brother of the former, general councilor, deputy of Charente, mining engineer.

The following individuals are also related to the Carnot family through marriage:

- Marie Pauline Cécile Carnot, née Dupont-White (20 July 1841 in Paris – 30 September 1898 in Cerny), wife of President Sadi Carnot.

Claude; Carnot (1719–1797)

Joseph; Carnot (1752–1835)

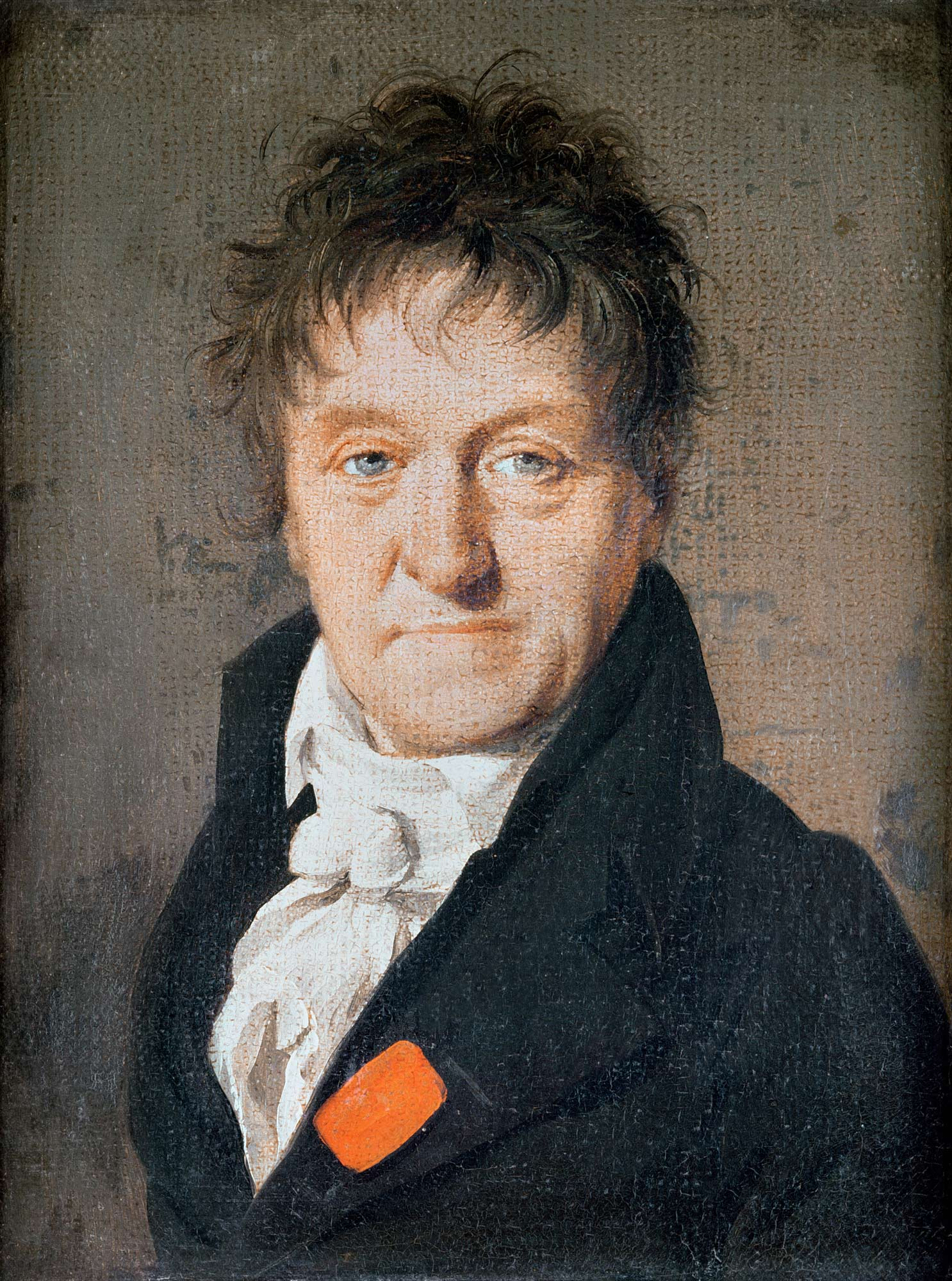
Lazare; Carnot (1753–1823)

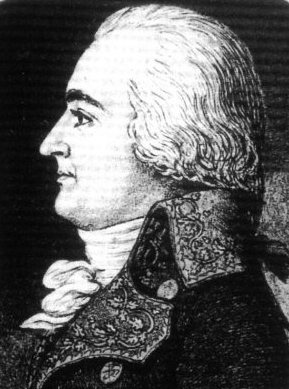
Claude; Carnot (1755–1836)

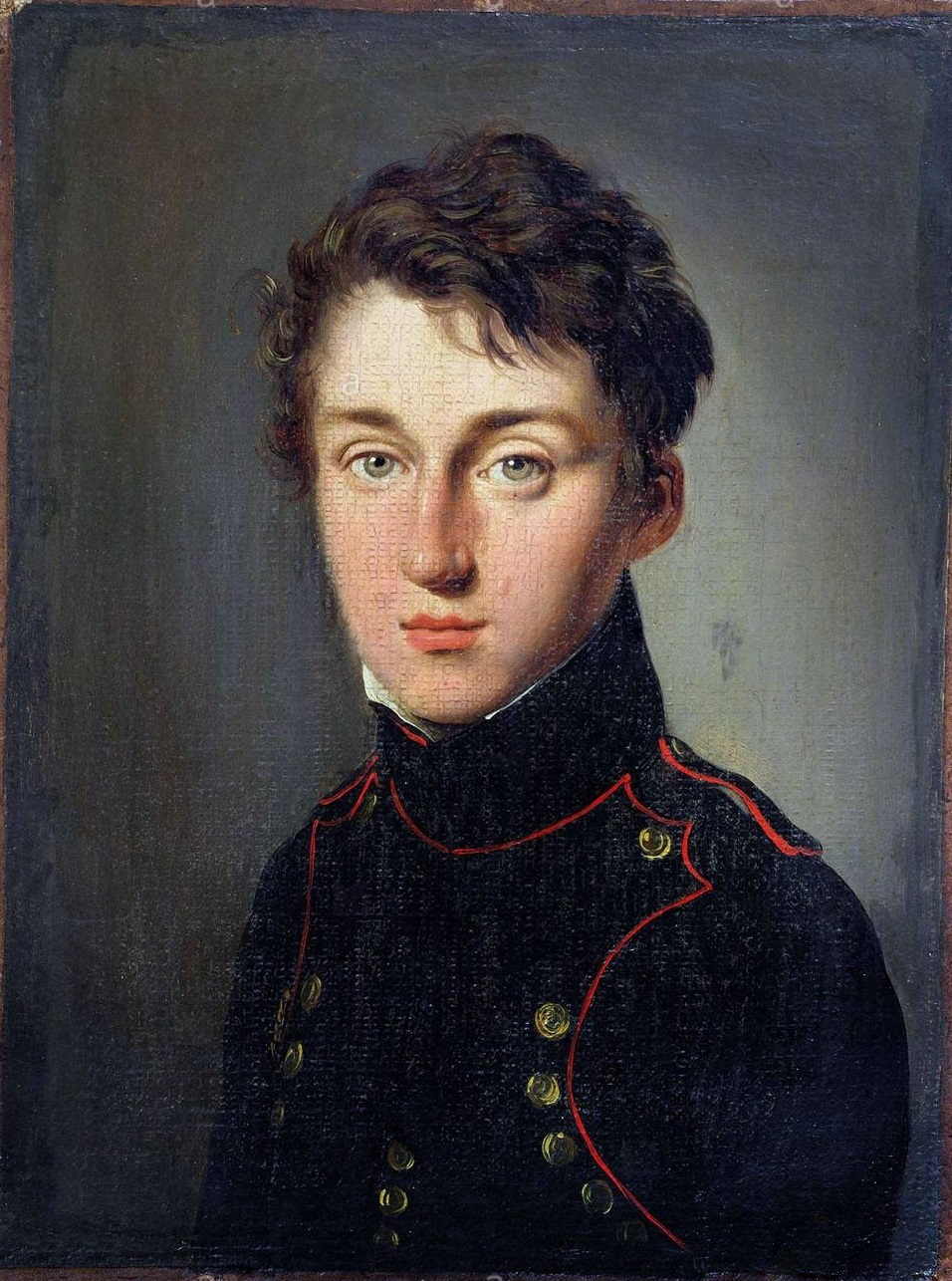
Sadi; Carnot (1796–1832)

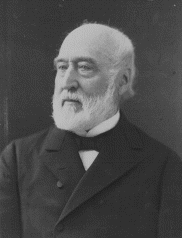
Hippolyte; Carnot (1801–1888)

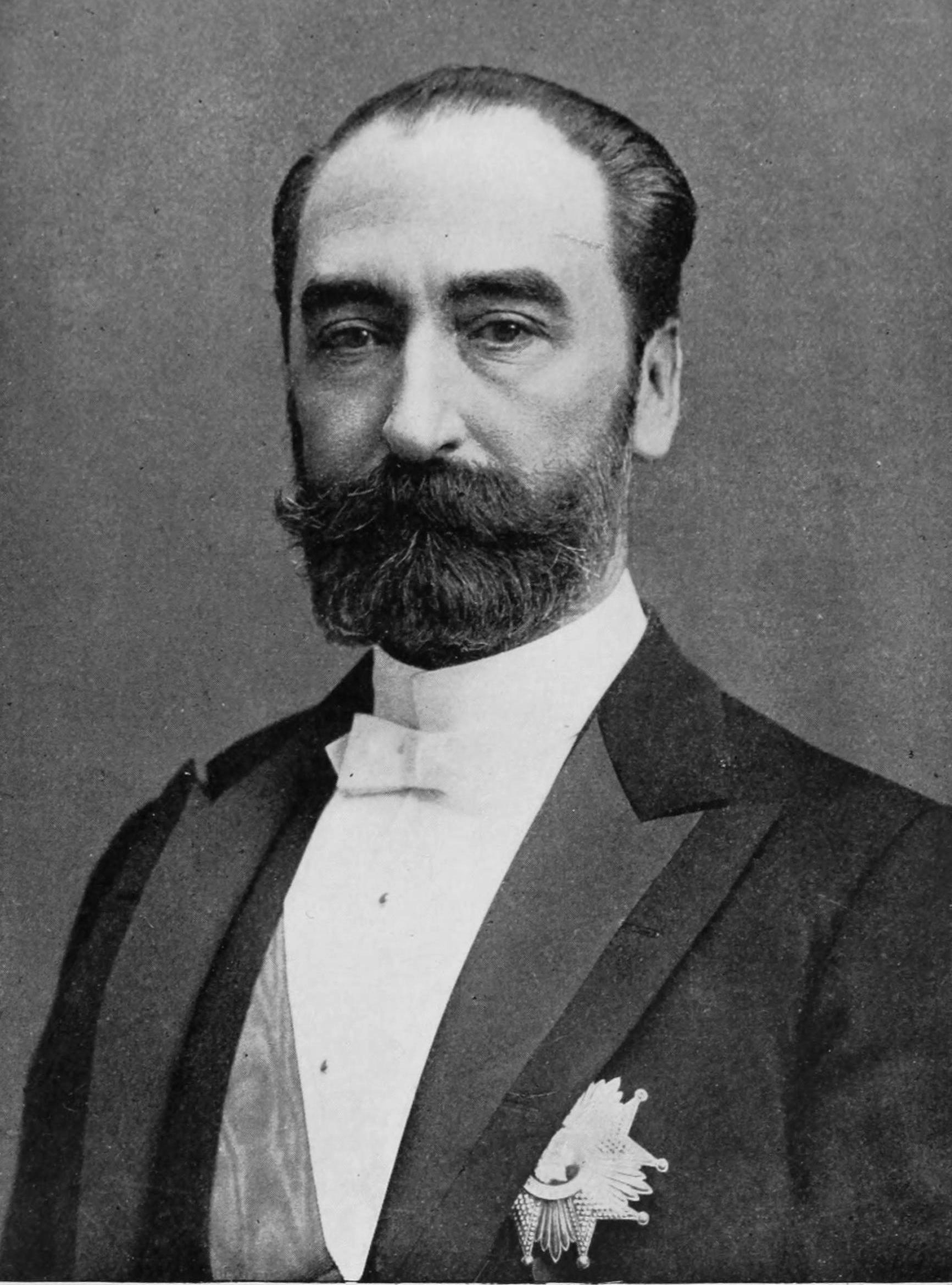
Sadi; Carnot (1837–1894)

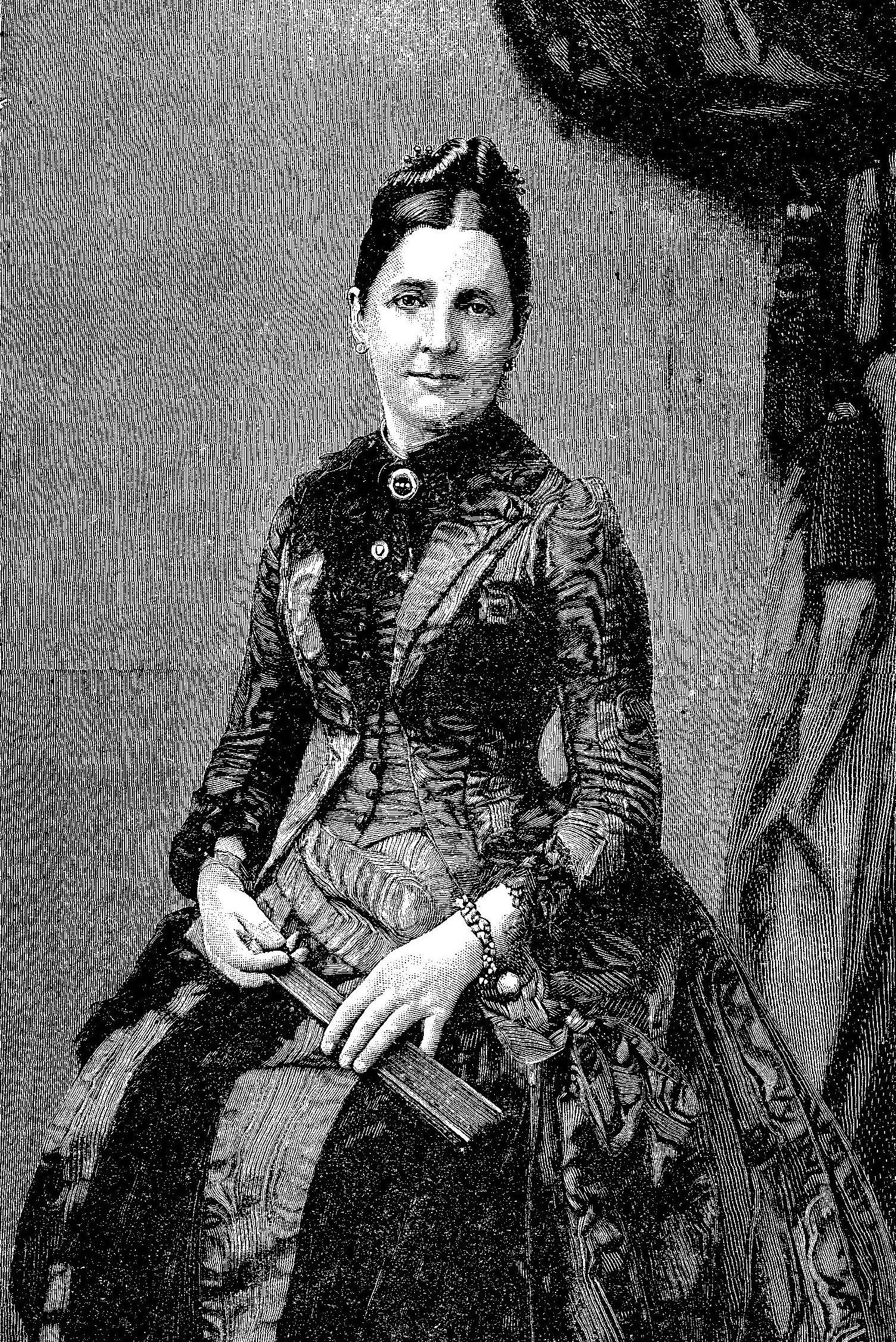
Cécile; Carnot (1841–1898)

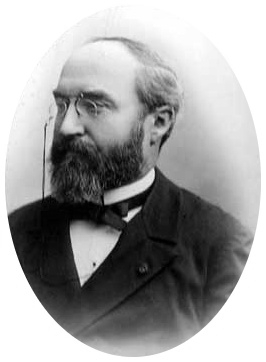
Adolphe; Carnot (1839–1920)

Claire; Carnot (1864–1920)

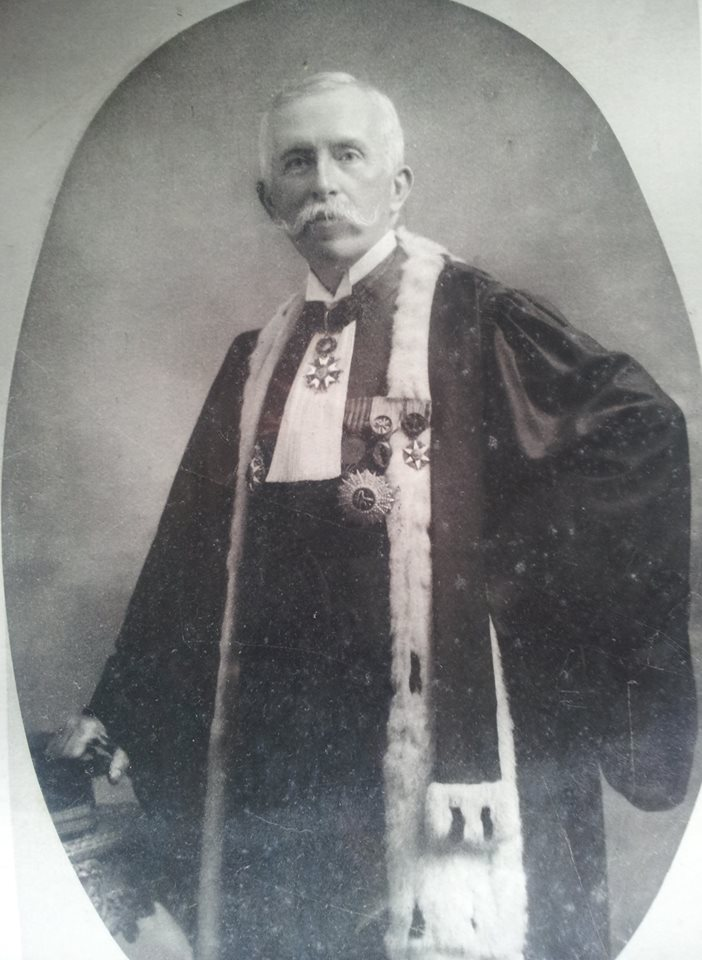
Paul; Cunisset-Carnot (1849–1919)

Sadi; Carnot (1865–1948)

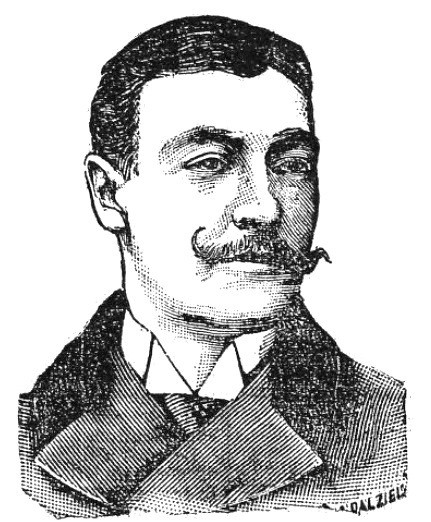
Ernest; Carnot (1866–1955)

Marguerite; Carnot (1874–1962)

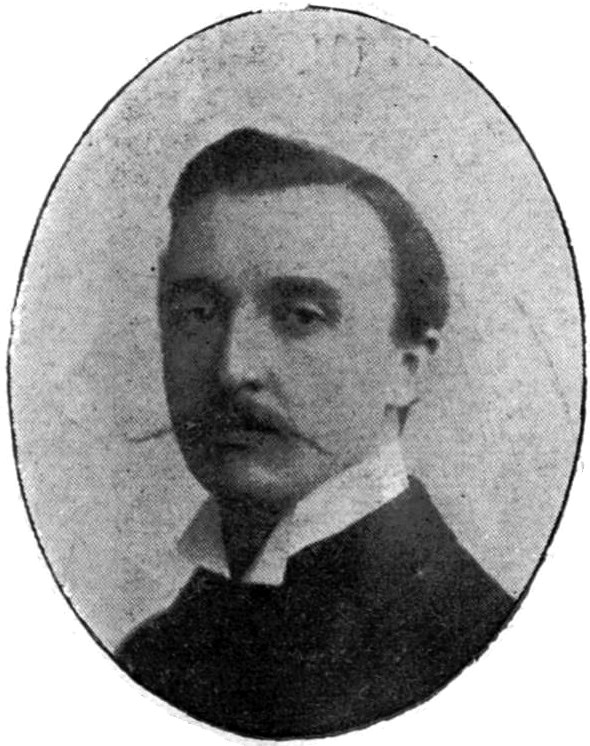
François; Carnot (1872–1960)

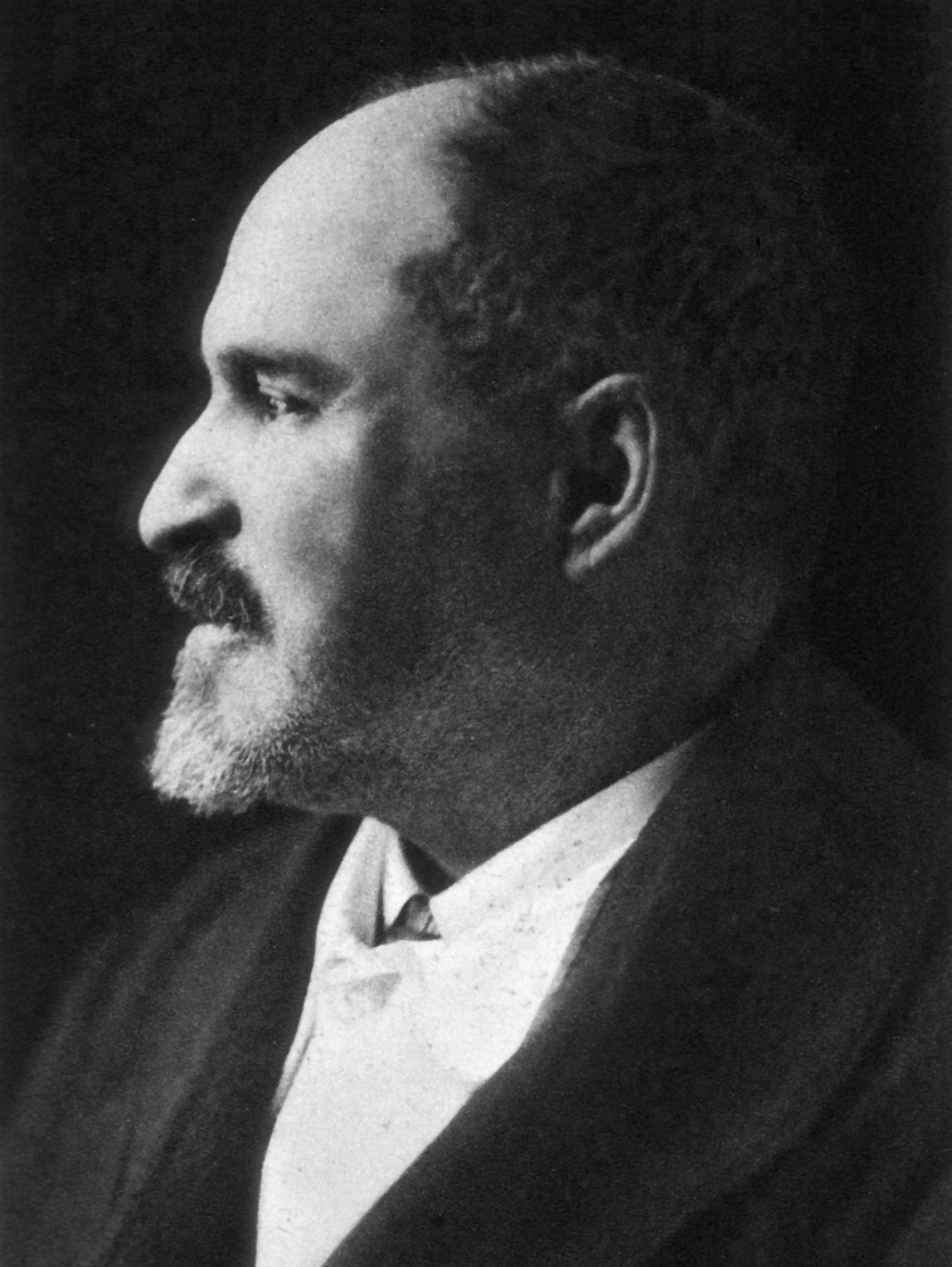
Paul; Carnot (1869–1957)

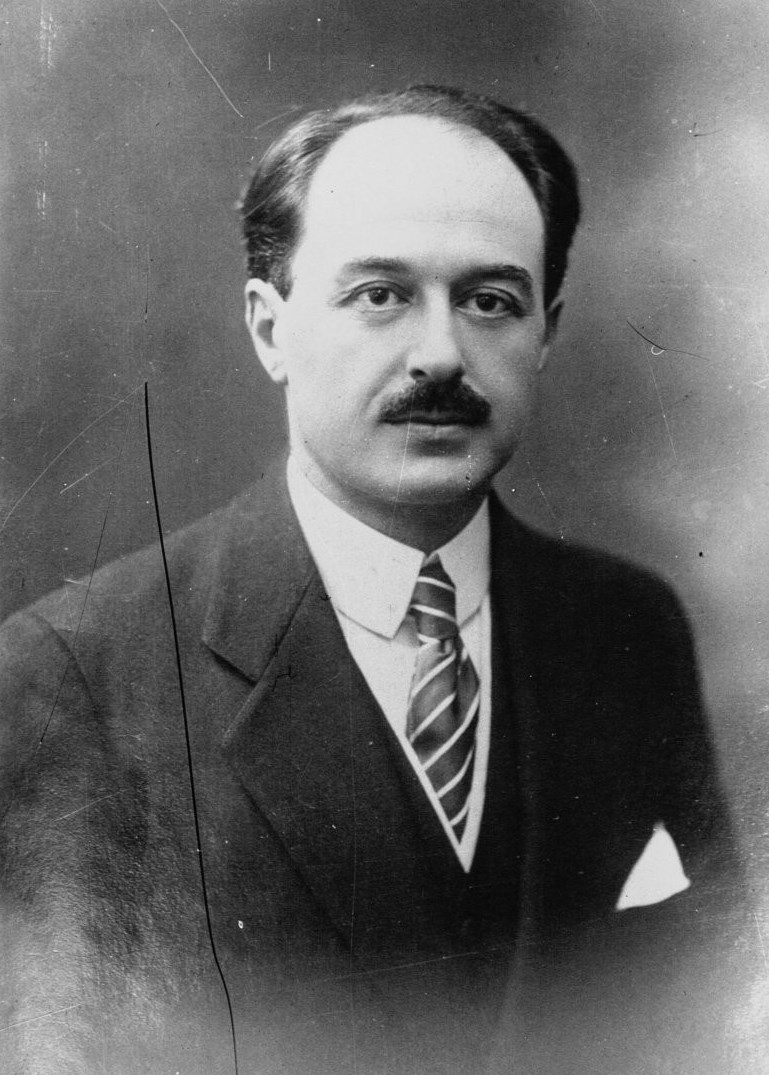
Jean; Carnot (1881–1969)

== Carnot Foundation ==
The Carnot Foundation, established in 1996 under the aegis of the Fondation de France, awards annual scholarships to students of the École polytechnique and to doctors of science from the University of Burgundy. The foundation also contributes to the publication of books or the dissemination of teachings on scientific research.

== Burials ==
- President Sadi Carnot has rested at the Panthéon, near his grandfather, since July 1, 1894 (one week after his assassination). He is the only President of the Republic to rest there.
