= Hilaire de Chardonnet =

French engineer, inventor of artificial silk (1839–1924)

Count de Chardonnet
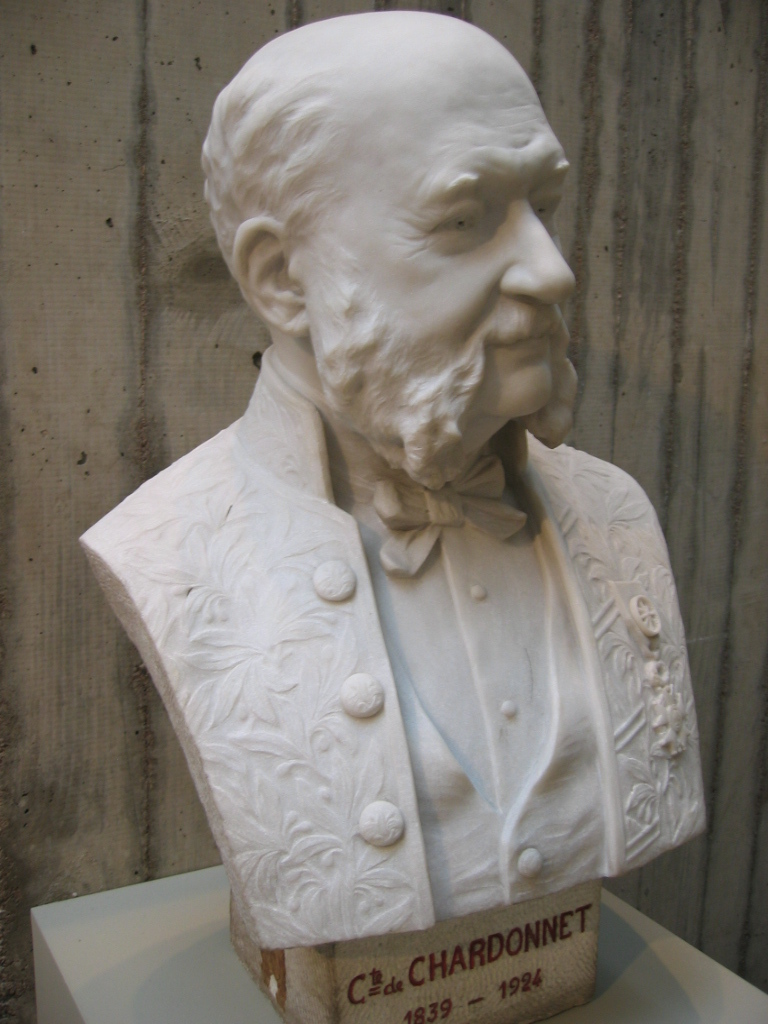
- Hilaire de Chardonnet sculpture by his daughter Anne de Chardonnet
- Born: 1 May 1839; Besançon, France
- Died: 11 March 1924 (aged 84); Paris, France
- Title: Count

Louis-Marie Hilaire Bernigaud de Grange, Count (Comte) de Chardonnet (1 May 1839 – 11 March 1924) was a French engineer and industrialist from Besançon, and inventor of artificial silk.

In the late 1870s, Chardonnet was working with Louis Pasteur on a remedy to the epidemic that was destroying French silkworms. Failure to clean up a spill in the darkroom resulted in Chardonnet's discovery of nitrocellulose as a potential replacement for real silk. Realizing the value of such a discovery, Chardonnet began to develop his new product.

He called his new invention "Chardonnet silk" (soie de Chardonnet) and displayed it in the Paris Exhibition of 1889. However, Chardonnet's material was extremely flammable, and was subsequently replaced with other, more stable materials.

He was the first to patent artificial silk, although Georges Audemars had invented a variety called rayon in 1855.

== See also ==
- Cellatex
