= Thernand Bakouboula =

Footballer (born 1988)

Personal information
- Full name: Georra Thernand Cesly Bakouboula
- Date of birth: 6 June 1988 (age 38)
- Place of birth: Échirolles, France
- Height: 1.85 m (6 ft 1 in)
- Position: Forward

Youth career
- FC Échirolles

Senior career*
Years	Team	Apps	(Gls)
2007–2010	Grenoble B	28	(6)
2010–2011	Altay Izmir	23	(4)
2012–2013	RJS Heppignies	13	(1)
2013–2015	FC Échirolles	45	(17)
2015–2016	Saint-Priest	18	(3)
2016–2017	FC Bourgoin Jallieu	13	(4)
2017–2019	FC Échirolles		
2019–2021	AC Seyssinet-Pariset		

International career
2009	Congo	2	(0)
- * Club domestic league appearances and goals

Thernand Bakouboula (born 6 March 1988) is a former professional footballer who played as a forward. Born in France, he made two appearances for Congo at international level in 2009.

== Club career ==
Bakouboula was born in Échirolles. He played during his career in France with FC Échirolles and Grenoble, in Turkey for Altay Izmir and in Belgium with RJS Heppignies-Lambusart-Fleurus.

He returned to FC Échirolles in summer 2017.

== International career ==
Bakouboula made his full international debut for Congo on 12 August 2009 in a friendly against Morocco.
