= Jonathan Tinhan =

French footballer (born 1989)

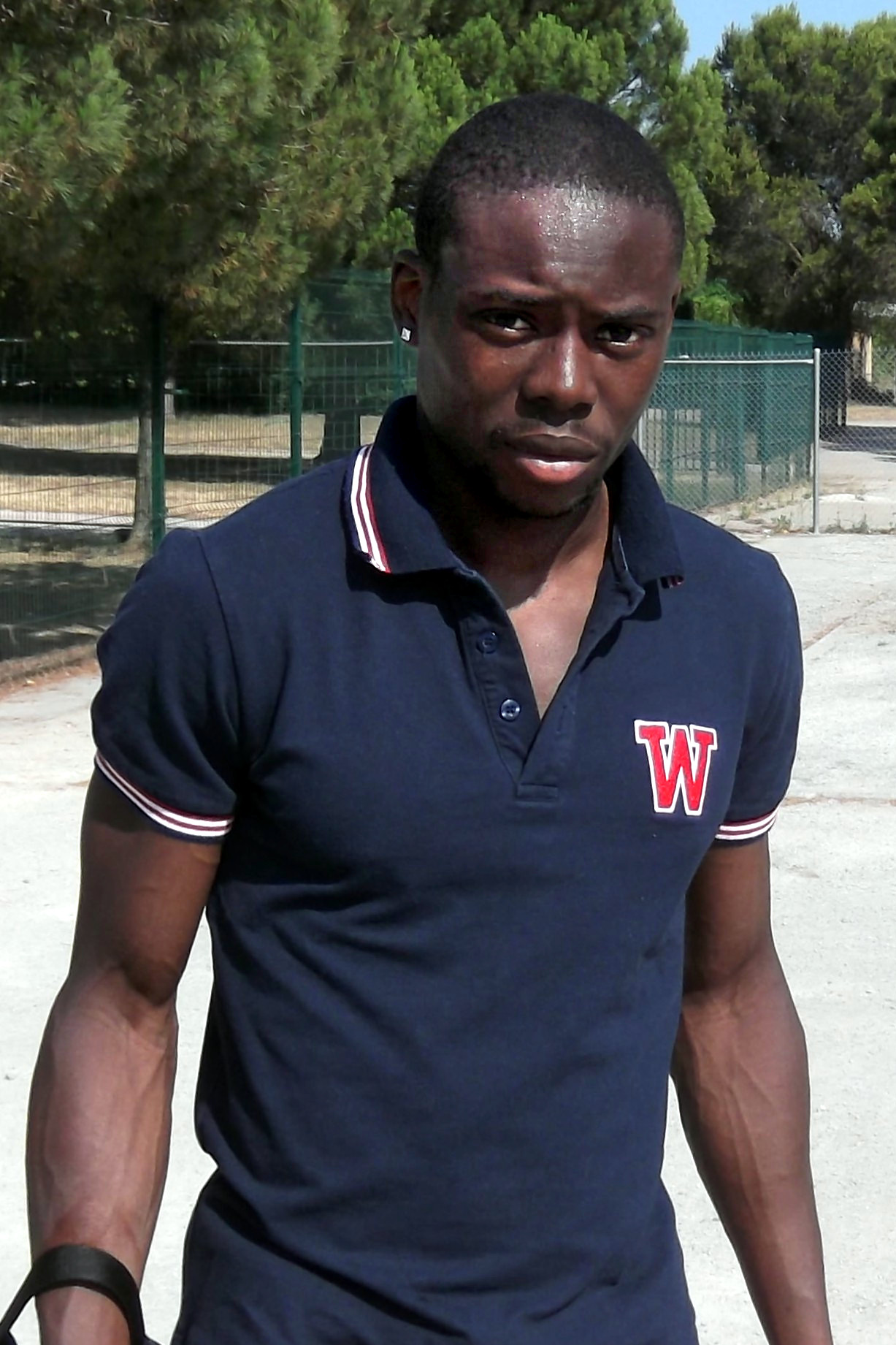
- Tinhan in 2013

Personal information
- Date of birth: 1 June 1989 (age 37)
- Place of birth: Échirolles, France
- Height: 1.79 m (5 ft 10 in)
- Position: Striker

Youth career
- 2006–2009: Grenoble

Senior career*
Years	Team	Apps	(Gls)
2009–2011	Grenoble	26	(3)
2011–2014	Montpellier	8	(1)
2012–2014	Montpellier B	24	(9)
2013	→ Arles-Avignon (loan)	14	(0)
2014–2015	Istres	18	(3)
2015	Red Star	20	(0)
2015–2017	Amiens	51	(20)
2017–2019	Troyes	37	(1)
2019–2020	Grenoble	22	(1)
Total		220	(36)
- * Club domestic league appearances and goals

Jonathan Tinhan (born 1 June 1989) is a French former professional footballer who played as a striker.

== Career ==
Born in Échirolles and of Beninese descent, Tinhan made his professional Ligue 1 debut on 16 August 2009 for Grenoble in a Ligue 1 game against Boulogne.

In 2011, he moved to Montpellier, signing a four-year deal.

Ahead of the 2019–20 season Tinhan returned to Grenoble. In April 2020, with his contract running out at the end of the season, Tinhan announced his retirement from playing professionally.
