= Hugo Cianci =

French professional football player (born 1989)

Personal information
- Date of birth: 9 June 1989 (age 37)
- Place of birth: Grenoble, France
- Height: 1.78 m (5 ft 10 in)
- Position: Defender

Youth career
- 2007–2009: Grenoble Foot

Senior career*
Years	Team	Apps	(Gls)
2009–2011	Grenoble Foot	32	(8)
2011–2012	Boulogne	18	(1)
2012–2017	Grenoble Foot	95	(7)
2017–2018	Annecy	12	(0)
- * Club domestic league appearances and goals as of 13:02, 12 February 2019 (UTC)

Hugo Cianci (born 9 June 1989) is a French professional football player who most recently played for Annecy.

== Career ==
He began his career at Grenoble Foot in 2007 and was promoted to the first team in 2009, he made his debut on 7 November 2009 against Monaco in the Ligue 1.

Having arrived at Annecy FC in July 2017, he left in early January 2019.
