= Oskar Huth =

German graphic artist, resistance fighter (1918–1991)

Oskar Huth (26 February 1918 – 21 August 1991) a German graphic artist, forger, a word smith and compelling teller of tales, a drinker and a noted bohemian who never really seemed comfortable if he had a permanent residence and who walked everywhere in his home city, Berlin, because he was passionately suspicious of public transport. More than that, he became notable in Germany for resisting the inhumanity of the Nazi regime.

During World War II he got hold of a printing press which he installed in the cellar of a house vacated by a friend who had sought refuge from the bombing by moving to the Thuringian countryside after her husband was killed in the war. Under the wartime conditions of the time, people who did not officially exist had no access to food rations. By producing high quality forged identity documents and ration stamps, Huth enabled many people who, officially, did not exist (often because they were Jewish), to eat.

== Life ==
Oskar Huth was born in Berlin. His father was an organ builder and piano maker, who taught his trade to his son who evidently inherited the necessary craft skills. Interaction with his father's customers provided access to the world of books and stimulating conversation beyond the conventional proletarian class constraints of his background, and he would grow up to become an unconventional man. A few weeks before his fifteenth birthday the Nazis took power in Germany. He considered joining the Hitler Youth but, as he later recalled an interview with a Gestapo officer about his Jewish friends "opened his eyes". "For this lot", as he later put it, "I was not going to join in the war", a decision to which he later held firm.

He completed his Begabtenprüfung (special matriculation examination without Abitur) and studied in Berlin between 1936 and 1939 various skills associated with graphic artistry including printing technology and lithography. World War II broke out in September 1939 and he received conscription papers requiring him to join the army. However, by applying what German language sources describe as a Švejk tactic he managed to have his call-up deferred for a year on account of alleged Motor skill deficiency (motorische Störungen). It is not clear from sources whether in the end his military call-up was deferred for one year or two. In any event, during that time he lived his life in the local bars, becoming increasingly aware of the way that when his Jewish friends disappeared to concentration camps they seemed never to come back. In November 1941 he received his call-up papers again and disappeared from Berlin, while taking steps to have it known that he was one of the many Berliners who had been killed in an air raid. However, he soon returned to the city and set about building for himself a life and an identity that involved "going underground", which in the context of the time and place not registering his place of residence with the local town hall. He spent a difficult winter, moving from place to place and sometimes spending the night with friends, before finding a more permanent solution in March 1942.

Huth's friend, the fashion designer Käte Kausel, lived with her family in an apartment at Dillenburger Straße 58f in Berlin-Wilmersdorf. After her husband was killed at the front she determined to leave Berlin with her son and move to Zeulenroda. She was happy for Huth to make use of her otherwise empty apartment, which was sufficiently substantial to incorporate a large cellar. He did not exactly conceal himself in the cellar, and for many purposes "hid in plain sight", but the neighbourhood was one in which people knew each other and the default assumption was that if you saw someone regularly in the street they must be legal. Everyone knew which were the active Nazis who might make trouble for a person suspected of illegally using the cellar at Mrs.Kausel's house. These he managed to avoid.

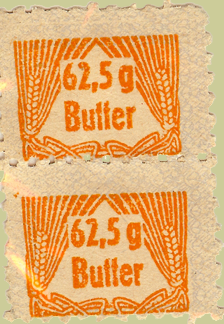
Wartime ration stamps produced by Oskar Huth

It turned out that there was more to his plan than simply keeping a low profile. Later in March 1942 he obtained a manual printing press which, using a handcart, he transported from Kreuzberg to Käte Kausel's cellar in Wilmersdorf, where he set it up. He used the press to create himself a fictitious identity as "Oskar Haupt", creating both an official (seeming) identity document and a certificate of military unfitness. The quality was excellent: even the usual watermarks were correctly incorporated. According to the documents Oskar Haupt was employed as a scientific draftsman at the Botanical Institute in Berlin Dahlem.

Having perfected his technique he quickly branched out, specialising in official documents, notably military identity cards and ration stamps for butter, Reisebuttermarken. Most food ration coupons were marked with the name and address of the holder, but these butter coupons were meant for travellers and were anonymous and were untraceable and they could be used and traded for other ration coupons on behalf of people who were living illegally (unregistered) and therefore received no ration coupons from the authorities. Their quality was characteristically excellent: butter coupons incorporated watermarks as a protective device to prevent forgery. Huth's butter coupons incorporated the same water marks. It was estimated that more than 60 people, mostly Jewish, who were hidden in the cavity directly under the rafter in the or cellars of people's homes, were able to survive because of the coupons produced by Huth in Käte Kausel's cellar.

One beneficiary of Huth's printing work was the artist Heinz Trökes whom he provided with an official exemption from army service. Two others were the aristocratic plotters Ludwig and Kunrat von Hammerstein-Equord who were obliged to "disappear underground" after the failed attempt to kill Hitler in July 1944. Huth's insights into the workings of the Nazi bureaucratic mentality were in evidence when he planned and created a new identity for Ludwig von Hammerstein, taking care to ensure that the false identity provided should state that he was born into an expatriate German family in South America. The idea was to reduce the risk that the authorities might be induced by inadvertent nonconformist actions to investigate the identity more closely. Foreign born Germans might be expected not to have grown up with precisely the same social ground rules as German born Germans. The Hammerstein brothers both survived the war and lived to a good age.

War ended and the Nazi regime collapsed in May 1945. Huth the raconteur had some new tales to tell in the bars, and his wartime exploits became widely known. There are stories that he was offered all sorts of jobs, including one as minister for culture in the Senate of Berlin. It is not clear where such stories originated. In any event, Huth himself defined his new job as Freischaffender Kunsttrinker (freelance artisan drinker). He was never a man who valued material wealth, but he survived happily as a pub pianist. His cultural and social circle now included a younger generation – and some might argue a more distinguished cast – of bohemian artists and writers such as Günter Grass, Günter Bruno Fuchs and Robert Wolfgang Schnell.

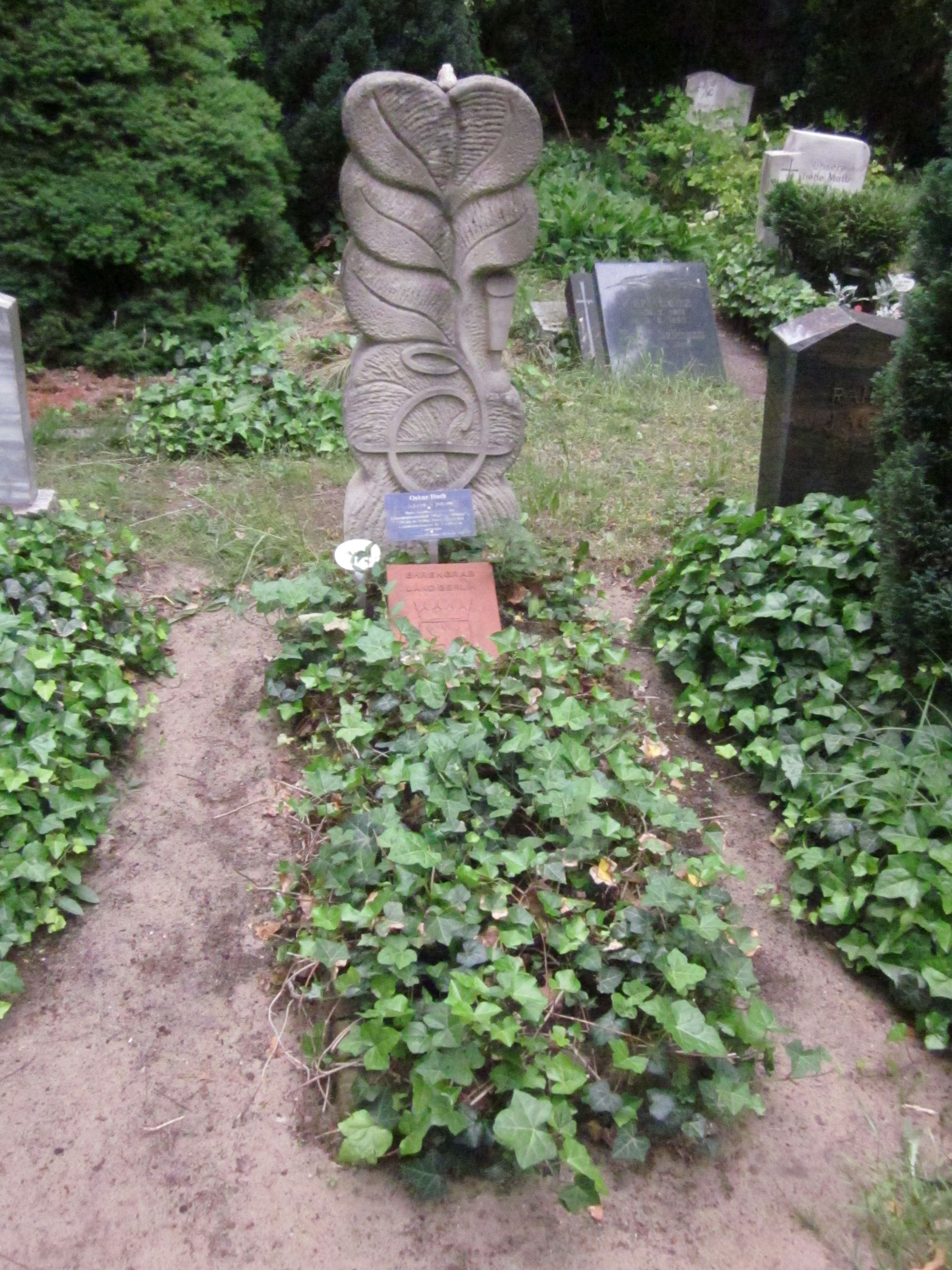
Huth's grave of honour

== Celebrations ==
Huth continued his easy going alcohol fueled lifestyle till his death in the summer of 1991. He wore his minor celebrity lightly but was nevertheless celebrated by members of the artistic community.

The writer Peter O. Chotjewitz presented a portrayal of Huth in his story "Ein Mann namens Nagel" (A man called Nail).

In his novel Dog Years, Günter Grass created a recognisable character called Hütchen (Little Hat), a piano maker and forger by profession.

In his novel Geisterbahn (Phantom Railway), Robert Wolfgang Schnell includes a character called "Bubi Paffrath" based on Huth.

It has been suggested that Günter Bruno Fuchs, Rolf Haufs and Reinhard Lettau all wrote poems inspired by Huth's character. Huth also gets a mention in the autobiography of Kurt von Hammerstein-Equord. From a younger generation, the writer Friedrich Christian Delius wrote in his biographical novel Mein Jahr als Mörder (My Year as a Murderer) about Huth, and about his own inability, when opportunity presented itself, to speak to him.

== After death ==
Huth's body was placed in a Ehrengrab (grave of honour) in the Friedhöfe vor dem Halleschen Tor (cemetery at the Hallesches Tor) at the Mehringdamm, close to his old haunts.

He is honoured in Berlin's Gedenkstätte Stille Helden (memorial to dead heroes) which opened in 2008. There has, since then, been at least one major exhibition celebrating his life.
