= Real school =

Type of secondary school in Germany, Switzerland, Liechtenstein and Estonia

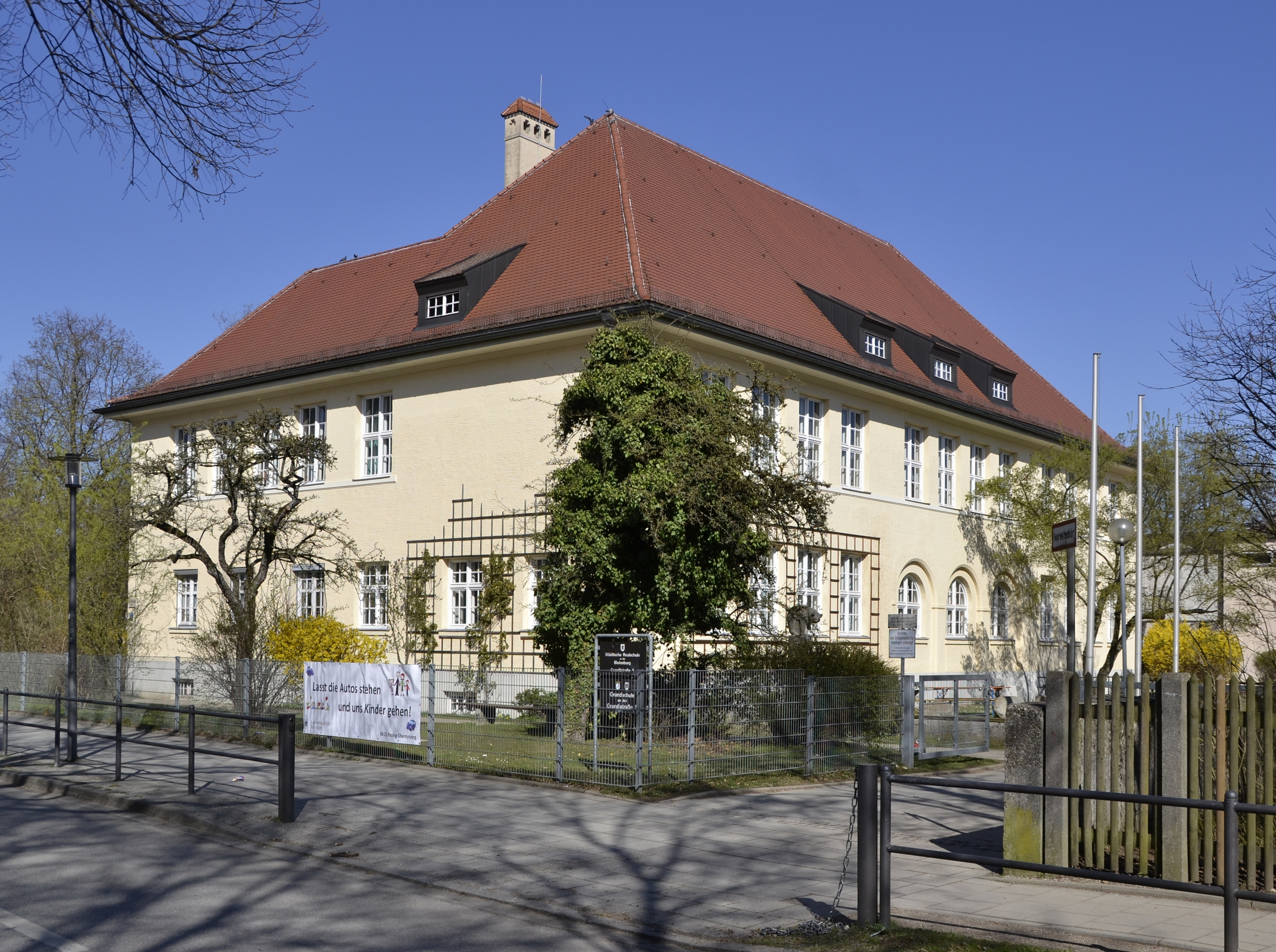
Realschule at the Blutenburg, Germany

Real school (German: Realschule, pronounced [ʁeˈaːlʃuːlə]) is a type of secondary school in Germany, Switzerland and Liechtenstein. It has also existed in Croatia (realna gimnazija), the Austrian Empire, the German Empire, Denmark and Norway (realskole), Sweden (realskola), Estonia (reaalkool), Finland (reaalikoulu), Hungary (reáliskola), Latvia (reālskola), Slovenia (realka), Serbia (realna gimnazija/realka), and the Russian Empire (реальное училище), including partitioned Poland (szkoła realna).

== Germany ==
=== Situation of the school ===
In the German secondary school system, Realschule is ranked between Hauptschule (lowest) and Gymnasium (highest). After completing the Realschule, good students are allowed to attend a professional Gymnasium or a general-education Gymnasium. They can also attend a Berufsschule or do an apprenticeship.

In most states of Germany, students start the Realschule at the age of ten or eleven and typically finish school at the age of 16–17. In some states, Realschulen have recently been replaced by Oberschulen or Sekundarschulen. In 2006 1.32 million German students attended a Realschule.

At Realschule, a student gets an extended education and learns at least one foreign language, usually English. In the state of Baden-Württemberg, after the sixth grade, the student has to choose among technology, home economics, and a second foreign language, usually French. The new subject becomes the student's fifth main subject, after German, math, science and English; and it is also possible to learn other foreign languages in free workshops. Other subjects are geography, social sciences, economics, history, religious education, and physical education. After the 8th grade a student has to choose between arts and music.

High school diplomas obtained in Canada or the United States are usually acknowledged as a Mittlere Reife (graduation from a Realschule). In some cases however students may apply for certain subjects at a university. All students holding an American high school diploma may apply for the Studienkolleg, and after successfully graduating from this they may attend a German university. Those holding a high school diploma can choose from a wider range of possible major subjects at a German university if they did well on the SAT or ACT. Those who scored higher than 1300 on the SAT or higher than 28 on the ACT may apply for any subject at a German university.

Gymnasia and Realgymnasia are the classical higher or secondary schools of Germany.

=== Abolition of the Realschule in Berlin and Hamburg ===
Starting in 2010/2011, Realschulen were formally abolished in Berlin and merged with Hauptschulen and the old Gesamtschulen to form a new type of comprehensive school, called Stadtteilschule in Hamburg and Sekundarschule in Berlin.

=== Performance of students attending the Realschule ===
According to the PISA examination, the students attending a Realschule were outperformed by those attending a Gymnasium. However, they did better than those attending a Hauptschule or a Gesamtschule school.

Performance on PISA (points earned) by social class and type of school
School type	"Very low" social class	"Low" social class	"High" social class	"Very high" social class
Hauptschule	400	429	436	450
Gesamtschule	438	469	489	515
Realschule	482	504	528	526
Gymnasium	578	581	587	602
PISA 2003 – Der Bildungsstand der Jugendlichen in Deutschland – Ergebnisse des 2. internationalen Vergleiches (PISA 2003 – Education level of young people in Germany – results of the second international comparison).

=== Criticism ===
The German tripartite system of education has been widely criticized for separating children along class lines at a very early age. For instance, in some German states, a decision is made in the sixth or even the fourth grade about whether a child is to continue in the Gymnasium, the Realschule, or the Hauptschule. Only the Gymnasium is a university-preparatory school, so critics argue that a decision is made as early as the fourth grade about whether a child will be allowed to attend college.

The system is considered so onerous outside Germany that the OECD even sent a special envoy to Germany to condemn current German practice. Specifically, the Brazilian expert found that German schools separate children according to social class, with children of academics and professionals more often being sent on to a Gymnasium, and working-class children being sent to a Realschule or a Hauptschule.

According to critics, the system is widely considered within Germany to be socially useful in the sense that the upper class is able to reserve the best schools for itself without having to resort to private schools. Finally, no democratic society outside the German-speaking world has tripartite school systems that separate children largely according to background; this finding was the main complaint about Germany in the recent PISA study.

Proponents of the tripartite system consider the arguments brought forward by the critics to be invalid. They point to the fact that not only Gymnasium, but also comprehensive schools and schools serving mature students, such as the Kolleg or the Berufsoberschule, offer the possibility for the Abitur. Also, it is possible to attend college without holding the Abitur. They also hold the opinion that state-funded Realschulen and Gymnasia have offered many working-class children the possibility to move up the social ladder. Proponents of the tripartite system fear that abolishing Gymnasia and Realschulen would lead to the growth of a private school sector.

Proponents of the Realschule also hold the opinion that it aids students' personality development. According to a study those attending a Realschule became more altruistic and more likely to care for others over time.

=== The "Erweiterte Realschule" and "Realschule Plus" ===
The "Erweiterte Realschule" (expanded Realschule) is a school that exists in the German State of the Saarland. It is not to be confused with the Realschule. While the Realschule is a selective school, the Erweiterte Realschule is a school that does not select its students on the basis of academic achievement or aptitude. It streams students by perceived ability after 7th grade. The "Realschule Plus" is a non-selective school that exists in the State of Rhineland-Palatinate. It offers general education classes (that resemble normal Realschule classes) as well as remedial classes. The Erweiterte Realschule and the Realschule Plus are not the school of first choice for many students and often are attended by students who have been turned down by or have been expelled from other schools.

== Austria-Hungary ==
The first in the empire was established in Vienna, 1771. Systematically they were founded by Habsburg Monarchy after 1804: e.g. 1811 in Brno (German-language), 1815 in Brody (Galicia), 1817 in Lviv and Trieste etc.

In the Czech lands, in the school year 1917/1918 there existed 43 Czech-language reálka, namely 30 in Bohemia and 13 in Moravia. There existed also German-language Realschulen. After World War I, many Realschulen became transformed to Realgymnasien. Realschulen were abolished in 1948 in Czechoslovakia.

The Realgymnasium was a compromise type between the Realschule and Gymnasium. In the Czech lands, Realgymnasien were established between 1862 (the first one in Tábor) and 1913 (the last one in Jilemnice). In the Czech lands, in the school year 1917/1918 there existed 35 Czech-language Realgymnasien; namely 24 in Bohemia, 10 in Moravia, and one in Czech Silesia.

In 1908, the Reformrealgymnasium was created as a new type of school in Austria-Hungary. Up to 1918, just seven such schools were established, two of them in the Czech lands (1909 Vrchlabí, 1911 Bohumín), both of them German-language.

== Norway ==
The realskole existed in Norway between 1935 and 1970. It replaced the former middelskole, and was the level between folkeskole (primary school) and gymnasium. The majority historically left school after folkeskole, and the realskole was meant as preparation for the gymnasium, itself a preparation for university studies. Only a small minority attended gymnasium in those times.

== See also ==
- Realgymnasium
