= Night school =

Type of adult learning school

A night school or evening school is an adult learning school that holds classes in the evening or at night to accommodate people who work during the day. A community college or university may hold night school classes that admit undergraduates.

== Germany ==
=== Abendgymnasium ===
An Abendgymnasium or "evening gymnasium" is a German class of secondary school for adults over the age of 18 which allows them to gain the Abitur. They were started in the 1920s as an opportunity for working class adults to improve their career options.

To gain access to these schools, the pupils need to be at least 18 years old, needs to have finished at least nine years of school before, and need to have completed vocational training or two years of being a stay-at-home parent. Anyone not fulfilling these requirements would usually attend a standard, day-time gymnasium to gain the Abitur. Evening schools are focused on providing further education for adults who do not have the time to attend during the day. Classes are usually held after 17:30, although some classes may be held in the mornings for parents with school-age children. Lessons are taught in a similar fashion to those at a typical German gymnasium and students will often remain at the school for four years before taking their final exams. Some institutions allow for online learning whereby students can complete the coursework for the Abitur at home and only need attend the school two nights a week. Tuition is typically free of charge for Germans at these schools. If the attendee has indirect costs, like having to reduce their work hours to attend school, they can get financial aid through BaföG. These financial aids are not repaid after graduation. In some federal states of Germany, private schools offer Abendgymnasium courses, too. They usually charge between €50 per month and €800 per year.

==== Courses ====
The courses consist of three main fields:

- Language: German, or German as a second language; English, French, Latin or Spanish
- History and politics: history, philosophy, economics, social sciences
- Science: mathematics, biology, chemistry, computer science

Additional sports courses are voluntary. The attendees of evening schools write the same final exams as pupils of all other public schools. The leaving certificate Abitur then allows them to attend universities.

=== Abendhauptschule ===
An Abendhauptschule ("Evening Hauptschule") is a German class of secondary school for mature students to allow them to gain the Hauptschulabschluss. Classes are usually held in the evening.

=== Abendrealschule ===
An Abendrealschule ("Evening Realschule") is a German class of secondary school for mature students, which allows them to gain the Mittlere Reife and sometimes also other school-leaving certificates. Classes are usually held in the evening.

== Austria ==
Abendgymnasien exist in Austria as well as Germany, preparing students for the Matura.

Abendgymnasium Wien, in Vienna, was founded in 1925, with the involvement of Wanda Lanzer, and was reopened in 1945 after having been closed by the Nazi government. Since 2014, the school has been located at Brünner Straße 72 in the Floridsdorf district, and about 2,000 students attended classes there in 2022.

Abendgymnasium Salzburg was founded in 1957. It is located on Franz-Josef-Kai, in the Lehen district.

== Italy ==
The scuola serale (evening school) is a structured institution for the education and training of professional adults in Italy.

The first evening schools opened in the first half of the nineteenth century under the pressure of the first civil strike organised by labor movements, with the main aim of reducing illiteracy. Major philanthropic actions contributed to the continued spread of scuola serale.

Beginning with elementary education, the first evening schools employed the educational process of "mutual education" (or mutual teaching) originated by British educators Andrew Bell and Joseph Lancaster, despite the scarcity of teachers. Initially, classes operated during the afternoon and evening. They were mainly frequented by peasants, workers and child laborers.

At the end of the century, provoked by a growing need to provide a complete technical and vocational training, evening classes spread in large industrial cities. Port technical schools helped initiate "Festive Sundays", a complement to the workshops that were only open on Sundays. Subsequently, these Sunday courses moved to the evening.

== United States ==
In the late 19th and early 20th centuries, some elementary and high schools in the United States provided evening classes for children from poor families who were engaged in farm work. By 1910, the main focus had changed to teaching English to non-English-speaking immigrant children.

== See also ==
- Adult education
- Abendhauptschule
- Abendrealschule
- Kolleg (a daytime school similar to an Abendgymnasium)
