= Academic grading in Germany =

Germany uses a 5- or 6-point grading scale (GPA) to evaluate academic performance for the youngest to the oldest students. Grades vary from 1 (very good, sehr gut) to 5 (resp. 6) (insufficient, ungenügend). In the final classes of German Gymnasium schools that prepare for university studies, a point system is used with 15 points being the best grade and 0 points the worst. The percentage causing the grade can vary from teacher to teacher.

== Grades by education ==
=== Primary and lower secondary education ===
In primary and lower secondary education (1st to 10th grade), German school children receive grades based on a 6-point grading scale ranging from 1 (excellent, sehr gut) to 6 (insufficient, ungenügend). Variations on the traditional six grade system allow for awarding grades suffixed with "+" and "−".

To calculate averages of suffixed grades, they are assigned fractional values, where 1 is 1.0, 1− is 1.3, 2+ is 1.7, 2 is 2.0, 2− is 2.3 and so on. As schools are governed by the states, not by the federal government, there are slight differences. Often a more granular scale of "1−" (equal to 1.25), "1-2" (= 1.5), "2+" (= 1.75), etc. is used; sometimes even decimal grading (1.0, 1.1, 1.2 and so on) is applied.

In end-of-year report cards, only unmodified integer grades may be used; in some regions they are written in text form.

Many states currently also prescribe the use of behaviour-based notes (Kopfnoten), which grade things such as Orderliness or General Behaviour.

=== Upper secondary education ===
In the final classes of Gymnasium schools (11th to 12th/13th grade) the grades are converted to numbers ("points"), where "1+" equals 15 points and "6" equals 0 points. Since 1+ exists in this system, theoretically a final Abitur grade of less than 1.0 is possible and such grades are used in an informal setting, although officially any student with less than 1.0 will be awarded a 1.0 Abitur. When the point system is used, a grade of 4 (5 points) is the lowest passing grade, and 4− (4 points) the highest failing grade.

15-point grading system in upper secondary education
Grade	+	1	–	+	2	–	+	3	–	+	4	–	+	5	–	6
Point	15	14	13	12	11	10	9	8	7	6	5	4	3	2	1	0

=== Tertiary education ===
German universities (except for law schools) grade with a scale of 1 to 5:

- 1.0–1.5 sehr gut (very good: an outstanding achievement)
- 1.6–2.5 gut (good: an achievement which lies substantially above average requirements)
- 2.6–3.5 befriedigend (satisfactory: an achievement which corresponds to average requirements)
- 3.6–4.0 ausreichend (sufficient: an achievement which barely meets the requirements)
- 5.0 nicht ausreichend / nicht bestanden (not sufficient / failed: an achievement which does not meet the requirements)

Most of the universities use "mit Auszeichnung bestanden" (passed with distinction/excellent) if the grade is a perfect score of 1.0.

==== Law schools ====
For law students at German universities, a similar system to the 1 to 5 scale is used that comprises one more grade that is inserted between 2 (gut) and 3 (befriedigend), named vollbefriedigend. This is because the grades 2 (gut) and 1 (sehr gut) are extremely rare, so an additional grade was created below gut to increase differentiation. Every grade is converted into points similarly to the Gymnasium system described above, starting at 18 points (excellent) down to 0 points (poor). 4 points is the lowest pass grade.

=== Overview ===
German grading system
Example of percentage	Grading level	1st-10th grade	11th-13th grade	Fachhochschule/University	Description	US equivalent
90-100%		1+	15 points	1.0	An outstanding performance	A+
90-100%	Sehr gut (very good)	1	14 points	1.0	An outstanding performance	A
90-100%		1-	13 points	1.3	An outstanding performance	A-
75-89%		2+	12 points	1.7	Exceeds the requirements considerably	B+
75-89%	Gut (good)	2	11 points	2.0	Exceeds the requirements considerably	B
75-89%		2-	10 points	2.3	Exceeds the requirements considerably	B-
60-74%		3+	09 points	2.7	Fulfills average requirements	C+
60-74%	Befriedigend (satisfactory)	3	08 points	3.0	Fulfills average requirements	C
60-74%		3-	07 points	3.3	Fulfills average requirements	C-
45-59%		4+	06 points	3.7	Meets requirements despite flaws	D+
45-59%	Ausreichend (sufficient)	4	05 points	4.0	Meets requirements despite flaws	D
0–44%		4-	04 points	5.0	A failed performance	F
0–44%		5+	03 points	5.0	A failed performance	F
0–44%	Mangelhaft (deficient)	5	02 points	5.0	A failed performance	F
0–44%		5-	01 points	5.0	A failed performance	F
0–44%	Ungenügend (insufficient)	6	00 points	5.0	A failed performance	F

* This conversion scheme is intended as a guideline, as exact conversions may differ.

== Conversion of grades ==
A matter of particular interest for those considering studying abroad or even enrolling full-time in a German university is the conversion of grades. While the below information may prove useful, it is recommended to contact the interested university directly to inquire which method they use to convert grades.

=== Modified Bavarian formula ===
A number of systems exist for the conversion of grades from other countries into German grades. One such system, used by most universities in North Rhine-Westphalia and Bavaria, is called the "Modified Bavarian Formula":

$x={N_{\mathrm{max}}-N_{\mathrm{d}}\over N_{\mathrm{max}}-N_{\mathrm{min}}}3+1$

where $x$ = German grade, $N_{\mathrm{max}}$ = best possible score in foreign country's grading system, $N_{\mathrm{min}}$ = lowest passing score in foreign grading system and $N_{\mathrm{d}}$ = obtained foreign grade (to be converted into German grade). The resulting value is rounded to the next German grade (e.g. 1.6 is rounded to the German grade 1.7 and 2.4 is rounded to 2.3). For resulting values between two German grades, the score is rounded to the better grade (e.g. 2.5 is rounded to the German grade 2.3 and 1.15 is rounded to 1.0).

=== Latin grades ===
In particular doctorate's degrees, e.g. Dr. phil. or Dr. rer. nat., are graded by using the Latin versions. In this case the grade (Note/Zensur) is called Prädikat. The following rough guide may be used to convert into standard German grades:

- summa cum laude (<1.0 = mit Auszeichnung, "with distinction")
- magna cum laude (1.0 = sehr gut, "very good")
- cum laude (2.0 = gut, "good")
- rite (3.0 = bestanden, "passed")

There is no fail grade; in that case the dissertation is formally rejected without a grade.

== East Germany (1950s–1980s) ==
In former East Germany, a 5-point grading scale was used until July 1991:

Grade	Text	Explanation
1	sehr gut (very good)	best possible grade
2	gut (good)	next-highest grade
3	befriedigend (satisfactory)	average performance
4	genügend (sufficient)	lowest passing grade
5	ungenügend (insufficient)	lowest possible grade and the only failing grade

With the polytechnic reform of the school system initiated by the Act on Socialistic Development of the School System in the German Democratic Republic the Ministry of People's Education wanted to adapt academic grading for all institutions in its jurisdiction, which were general educational schools, vocational schools and professional schools for the qualification of lower classes teachers, educators and kindergartners. Therefore, a reorganized grading scale was enacted in Directive on the introduction of a unified grading scale for secondary schools, extended secondary schools, special schools, vocational schools, institutes of vocational masters' education, institutes of vocational school teachers' education, institutes of vocational teachers' further education, institutes of teachers' education and pedagogic institutes. This directive was unchangedly effective from September 1, 1960, to August 25, 1993.

For all of the different subjects there were further recommendations with even more specific descriptions in relation to the general grading scale. These particular comments should help the teacher to grade the achievements of the students as objectively as possible.

This scale is identical to the current Austrian grading scale.

== Criticism of German grading policies ==
=== The case of Sabine Czerny ===
At public schools in Germany, grades are generally assigned according to fixed performance criteria and standardized grade scales, rather than by direct comparison with other students.

Specifically, in the 2008 case of Sabine Czerny, a Bavarian primary school teacher, Czerny thought that 91% of the class would be able to make a successful transition into a Realschule or a Gymnasium (high schools for which normally only about 50% of Bavarian children qualify based on their educational achievements). While the parents liked this result, the educational authorities questioned Czerny's grading standards. Czerny claims that her students' results stood up in cross-classroom tests; nonetheless she was transferred to another school. Czerny received much public sympathy and later went on to write a book about her experiences.

=== Comparisons between Gymnasium and Gesamtschule (comprehensive school) ===
German Gymnasiums are schools which aim to prepare students for college education. These schools are selective, and tough grading is a traditional element of the teaching. The culture of these works against students of average academic ability who barely qualify for a Gymnasium place, and who may then find themselves on the bottom of their class; these same students would have achieved better grades for the same effort if they had attended a non-selective comprehensive school (Gesamtschule).

A study revealed that a sample of Gymnasium high school seniors of average mathematical ability who chose to attend advanced college-preparatory math classes at their school ("Leistungskurs") found themselves in the very bottom of their class and had an average grade of 5 (i.e. failed the class). Comprehensive school students of equal mathematical ability found themselves in the upper half of the equivalent course in their school and obtained an average grade of 3+. It was found that students who graduated from a Gesamtschule tend to do worse in college than their grades in high school classes would predict - and vice versa for Gymnasium students.

== Predictive ability ==
Often the German grades are treated like an interval scale to calculate means and deviations for comparisons. Even though it lacks any psychometric standardization, the grading system is often compared to normally distributed norm-referenced assessments. Using an expected value of 3 and a standard deviation of 1, transformations into other statistical measures like Percentiles, T, Stanine etc. or (like in the PISA studies) an IQ scale are then possible.

This transformation is problematic both for high school grades and for university grades:

At high school level, schooling in most of Germany is selective—thus for instance a Gymnasium student who is underperforming compared to his classmates may still be close to or above average when compared to his entire age group.

At university level, the distribution is highly non-normal and idiosyncratic to the subject. Substantially more German students fail exams in university than in other countries (usually about 20–40%, often even more). Grades awarded vary widely between fields of study and between universities. (In law degrees, for instance, only 10–15% of candidates are awarded a grade better than "befriedigend".)

This might be one reason for the low graduation rates at university in international comparisons, as well as for the small number of people who obtain an "Abitur" in the first place. However, several empirical psychological studies show that the grades awarded in Germany at school and university have a high reliability when taking up higher education and research jobs. The universities usually demand high grades in Diploma Thesis or a Master Thesis. Thesis grades are by far the most critical factor while applying for job or higher education e.g. PhDs. One study from 1995 found that GPAs from school are a mild (weak) predictor for success in university and to a slightly better degree for success in vocational trainings, and that GPAs from school or university have nearly no predictive value for job performance. Nevertheless, due to rarity of psychometric testing (like Scholastic Aptitude Test (SAT) or the Medical College Admission Test (MCAT) and the like in the US) the GPA is usually used as the most predictive criterion available within an application process. For job recruiting, school/university grades have a high impact on career opportunities, as independent scientifically based recruitment and assessment is used by less than 8% of German employers (cf 50–70% in other European countries).

For international applicants, German grades are often relevant not only as school marks but also as part of university admission decisions. In many cases, foreign school-leaving certificates are assessed and converted into the German grading system before an applicant can be admitted to a bachelor’s programme. If a diploma is not considered equivalent to the German higher education entrance qualification, students may need to complete a preparatory course, such as Studienkolleg, before becoming eligible for direct admission.
