= J. P. Bemberg =

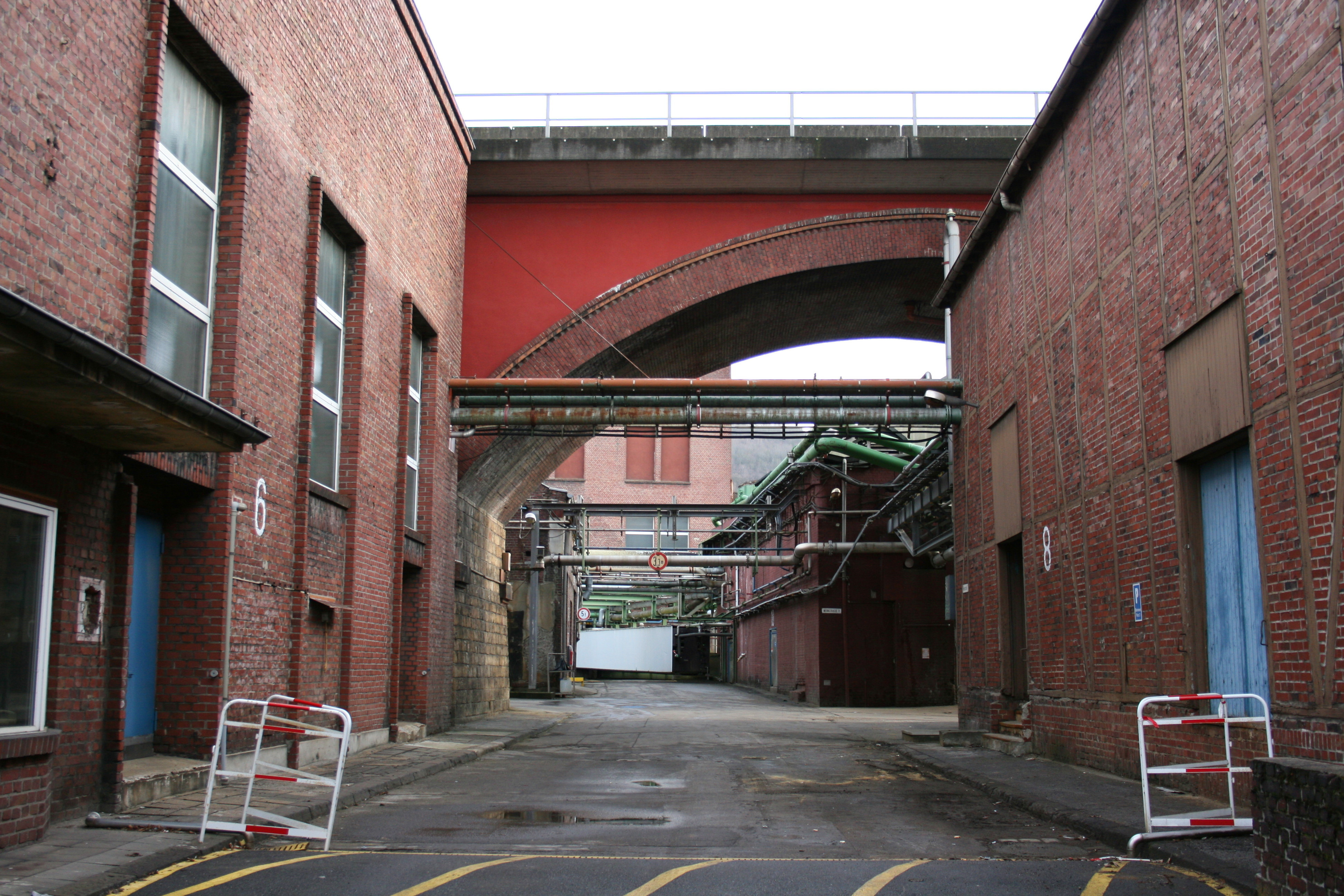
- J.P. Bemberg AG in Wuppertal
- Company type: Manufacturer
- Industry: Artificial fiber
- Founded: 1792
- Founders: Johann Peter Bemberg
- Defunct: 1971
- Successor: Vereinigte Glanzstoff-Fabriken
- Headquarters: Germany

J. P. Bemberg was a German rayon manufacturer that produced an unusually fine artificial fiber which became known as Bemberg. J. P. Bemberg came under the control of Vereinigte Glanzstoff-Fabriken and eventually disappeared after a series of mergers and divestitures, but Bemberg rayon was still being produced in 2015 by Asahi in Japan.

== Early years (1792–1897) ==
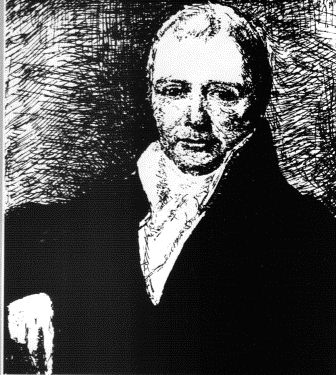
The founder, Johann Peter Bemberg (1758–1838)

Johann Heinrich Bemberg had a wine trading business in Elberfeld towards the end of the 18th century. When he died in 1790 his brother Johann Peter Bemberg (1758–1838) took over the business. In 1792 J. P. Bemberg changed the business to selling Indigo, a red dye, oil, cotton, linen and wool. He married Maria Theresia Scheibler (1774–1843) and they had a son, Julius August Bemberg, and two daughters. The business thrived, and in 1813 Bemberg took his son-in-law Friedrich Platzhoff into the company as a partner. Julius August Bemberg inherited the business when his father died in 1843, but he also died in 1847 and Friedrich Platzhoff continued to run the business on his own.

In 1865 Friedrich Platzhoff founded a new factory in Öhde, a district of Langerfeld. As the business continued to expand new factories were acquired in Barmen, Krefeld and Augsburg. For almost a century the company was known for its "Turkish Red" yarns. It was one of the first companies to engage in mercerisation of cotton yarns and fabrics, and for a long time was a leader in this field.

== Growth in rayon production (1897–1945) ==
J. P. Bemberg began to produce artificial textile fiber commercially using the cuprammonium process in 1897. The company went public as J. P. Bemberg AG in 1903. In 1901 Dr Edmund Thiele developed a stretch-spinning system for J. P. Bemberg, which began to produce fine-filament artificial silk under the Bemberg trademark in 1908. With this process J. P. Bemberg was able to make rayon using the cuprammonium process with filaments of 1–1.5 denier, comparable to Chardonnet silk and physically superior. (Note: In wet spinning, used to make rayon, acrylic and modacrylic fibers, the polymer is dissolved in solution to create what is called "dope". The dope is forced through an aperture into a liquid bath, where the liquid extracts the solvent from the dope and the fibers form. In the Bemberg stretch-spinning process, the cuprammonium dope is forced through holes of 0.6 to 1.6 millimetres (0.024 to 0.063 in) diameter into a funnel filled with warm spinning water that has been degassed and de-ionized. As the dope slowly coagulates it is stretched hydrodynamically as much as several hundred times.) The process did not have the flammability problems of Hilaire de Chardonnet's process, but could not compete with the viscose process except where very fine filament was needed. Costs were higher than with viscose rayon due to the need to use copper salts and cotton for the cellulose.

Bemberg founded a factory using Thiele's process at Ölde, near Barmen (now part of Wuppertal). Around 1911 Vereinigte Glanzstoff-Fabriken (VGF) began to invest in J. P. Bemberg, and encouraged Bemberg to focus on producing yarns for which that process was suitable. In 1916 VGF and Bemberg agreed to exchange technology, and from that time VGF concentrated on viscose production and left cuprammonium to Bemberg. Full-scale production only began after this. Bemberg's production of rayon rose from 440 tonnes in 1922 to 3,468 tonnes in 1935.

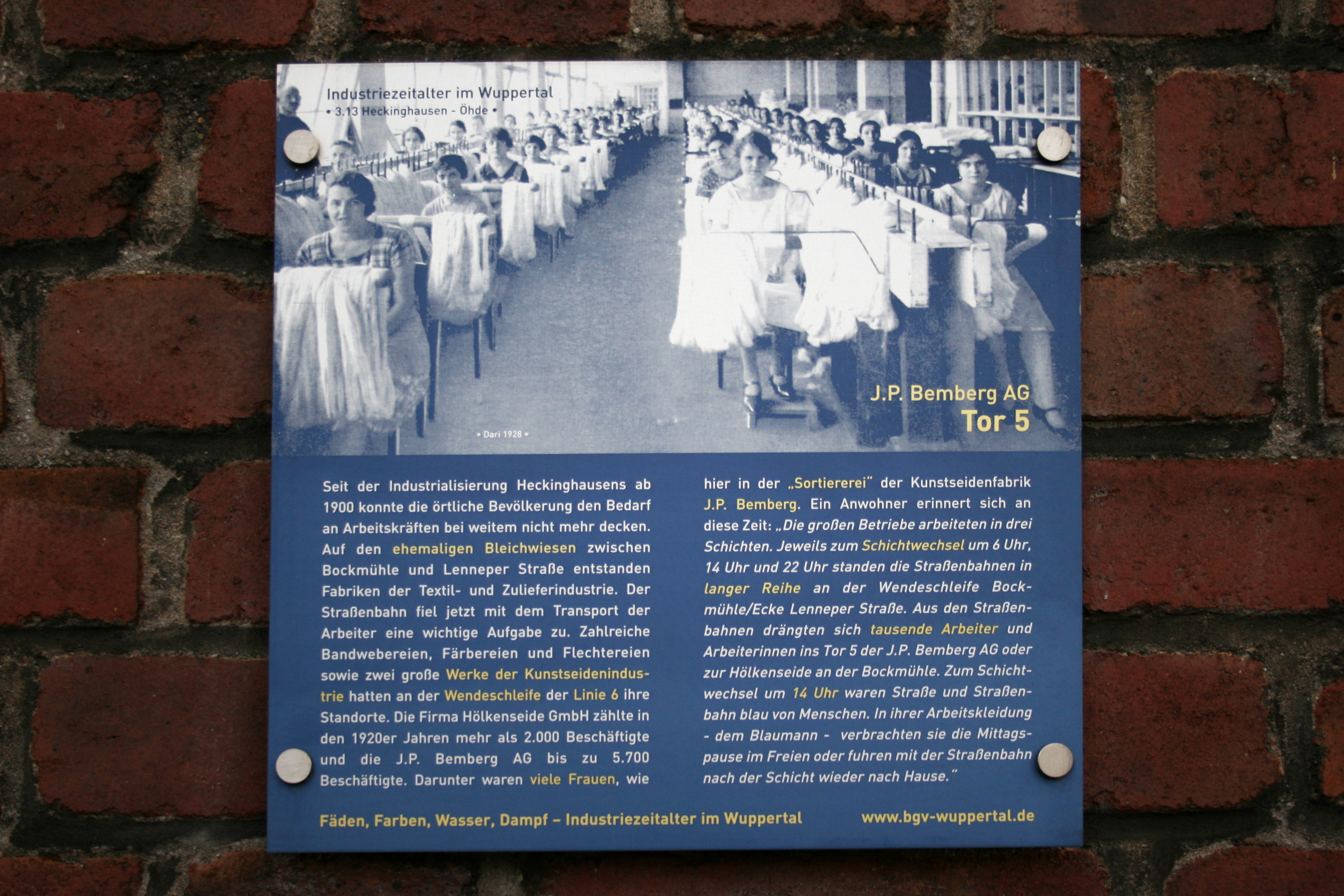
Plaque on the Bemberg factory in Wuppertal. The picture is from 1928

VGF steadily increased its holdings in Bemberg and gained full control in 1925. In 1925 IG Farben acquired a stake in VGF and Bemberg. In 1927 Bemberg had about 4,000 employees. The joint venture with IG Farben lasted until the latter closed its Hölken rayon plant in 1929. In March 1928 Bemberg agreed to build a rayon factory in Siegburg, and the factory opened in the autumn of 1929. However, the Great Depression forced closure before production had ramped up, and in the end the plant remained unused. In 1929 a new German-Dutch company was created, Algemene Kunstzijde Unie (AKU), through an exchange of shares. The Dutch firm Nederlandsche Kunstzidje (Enka), VGF and Bemberg remained distinct legal entities owned by AKU as a holding company.

During World War II Bemberg concentrated on making parachute silk. 4,400 employees made up to 40 tons of silk per day. The first Polish workers came to Wuppertal to work at the Bemberg factory early in 1940. 70% of the production facilities were destroyed in an air raid on 13 March 1945.

== Post-World War II (1945–71) ==
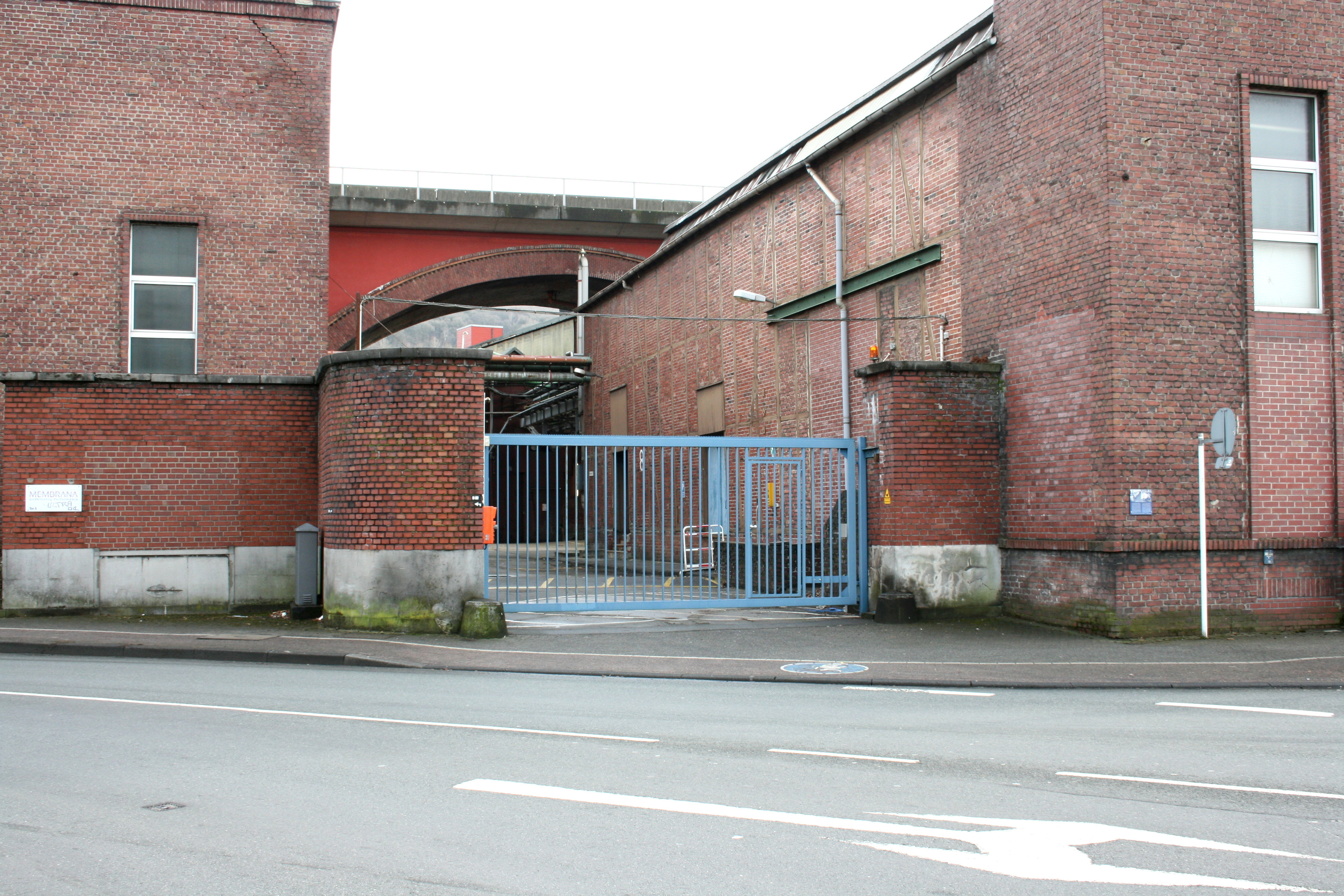
Bemberg facility in Wuppertal in 2009

In 1946 the company resumed operations with about 300 employees. VGF acquired 35% of J.P. Bemberg's capital in 1948. In 1955 VGF strengthened its control of Bemberg through an agreement by which it was given control of the Bemberg shares owned by its parent company AKU of the Netherlands, giving it 56% of Bemberg's shares. Engineer Funcke, chairman of the Board of Bemberg, noted that efforts to repair war damage and expand production had led Bemberg into fierce competition with its major shareholder. Bemberg was suffering from unstoppable competition from nylon and perlon.

From 1962 production of perlon flourished, and in 1963 there were 3,083 employees. Ownership was VGF 80.8%, AKU 8.7% and others 10.5%. There were about 3,800 employees in 1969. In 1969 AKU merged with the Dutch company Koninklijke Zout Organon (KZO), a manufacturer of coatings, drugs and detergents, to form a new company named Akzo. In 1971 Bemberg agreed to merge with Glanzstoff AG to form Enka Glanzstoff AG.

== Designer ==
From 1936 till 1938 Heinz Trökes was employed as designer at Bemberg.

== American Bemberg ==
The Bemberg technology was licensed to the American Bemberg Corp, founded in Elizabethton, Tennessee in 1925. American Bemberg began manufacturing cuprammonium rayon at Elizabethton in October 1926. There were several small strikes at the plant from 1927 to 1929. In August 1928 the VGF subsidiary American Glanzstoff opened a viscose plant in Elizabethton. The two plants had more than 3,000 workers by the end of 1928. Both suffered from labor problems throughout the 1930s, but production grew steadily. In 1933 the American Bemberg Corp. staged a fashion show in which the models wore fabrics woven from Bemberg yarns, or from these yarns combined with silk or other types of rayon.

American Bemberg increased production during World War II, and made parachute cloth. Early in 1942 the Office of Alien Property (OAP) took control of the Elizabethton plants, but did not seize the assets due to the Dutch ownership of the AKU holding company. In 1947 AKU transferred all rights in both plants to the OAP, and in December 1948 they were sold to Beaunit Mills of New York. Demand for rayon dropped after the war. In the 1950s the Bemberg facility began to manufacture polyester. The Bemberg plant was in serious financial trouble by the early 1970s, and could not comply with demands to reduce toxic waste emissions from the United States Environmental Protection Agency. The plant was sold and resold, and finally filed for bankruptcy on 16 February 1974.

== Other licensed manufacturers ==
The technology developed by Thiele for Bemberg was used in Italy by Bemberg SpA of Gozzano in 1924 and in France by Le Cupro textile of Rennes. Manufacturing of cuprammonium yarn began at British Bemberg in Doncaster, UK, in 1926. The firm was sequestrated by the British government in 1939. In 1928 the technology was licensed to Asahi Bemberg of Nobeoka, Japan. Asahi Kasei started operations at the newly built Bemberg factory in Nobeoka in 1931, and made its first shipment on 27 June 1931. By 1970 a total of four plants were producing rayon with the cuprammonium process. J.P. Bemberg in Wuppertal produced 27 tonnes/day; Beaunit Fibers in Elizabethton produced 25 tonnes/day; Bemberg SpA in Gozzano produced 14 tonnes/day and Asahi Chemical Industries Co in Nobeoka produced 80 tonnes/day. By 2000 only Asahi was still producing rayon in this way. By May 2011 Bemberg SpA was insolvent and the city of Gozzano was struggling to find purchasers for the real estate and machinery. As of 2015 Asahi Kasei Fibers Corporation was still producing rayon under the Bemberg™ brand.

== Sources ==
- "Bemberg AG". TurmCenter Siegburg. Archived from the original on 2015-09-25.
- "Bemberg and North American Rayon Corporation". Carter County History.
- Bemberg, Arnold August (2010). "Elberfelder Linie" (in German). Archived from the original on 2016-03-04.
- "Bemberg geht mit Glanzstoff". Die Ziet (in German). 1955-04-28.
- Chandler, Alfred Dupont (2009-06-30). Shaping the Industrial Century: The Remarkable Story of the Evolution of the Modern Chemical and Pharmaceutical Industries. Harvard University Press. ISBN 978-0-674-02937-8.
- Chandler, Alfred Dupont; Hikino, Takashi (2009-06-30). Scale and Scope: The Dynamics of Industrial Capitalism. Harvard University Press. ISBN 978-0-674-02938-5.
- "Collection: American Bemberg Strike of 1929 Film", Archives of Appalachia, East Tennessee State University
- Eismann (2015). "Untertage-Verlagerung in Wuppertal: Deckname "Trusche"" (in German).
- Eyll, Klara van; Schwärzel, Renate (1994). Deutsche Wirtschaftsarchive. Franz Steiner Verlag. ISBN 978-3-515-06211-4.
- Field, Jacqueline; Senechal, Marjorie; Shaw, Madelyn (2007-01-01). American Silk, 1830-1930: Entrepreneurs and Artifacts. Texas Tech University Press. ISBN 978-0-89672-589-8.
- "History". Asahi Kasei Fibers Corporation.
- James, Harold (2004-09-13). The Nazi Dictatorship and the Deutsche Bank. Cambridge University Press. ISBN 978-0-521-83874-0.
- Jones, Geoffrey (August 1988). "Foreign Multinationals and British Industry before 1945". The Economic History Review. New Series. 41 (3). Wiley on behalf of the Economic History Society: 429–453. doi:10.2307/2597369. JSTOR 2597369.
- Levy, Hermann (1966). Industrial Germany: A Study of Its Monopoly Organisations and Their Control by the State. Psychology Press. ISBN 978-0-7146-1336-9.
- Mutz, Marina Alice (2012). "Kriegsalltag 1939 bis 1942". ZeitSpurenSuche.de.
- Tedesco, Marie (2009-12-25). "North American Rayon Corporation and American Bemberg Corporation". Nashville, Tennessee: Tennessee Historical Society.
- Thönnissen, Karin (1992). Johannes Itten und die Höhere Fachschule für textile Flächenkunst in Krefeld. Deutsches Textilmuseum (German Textile Museum, Krefeld.
- Trupia, Maria Antonietta (2011-05-23). "Ex Bemberg: nuovo bando di vendita" (in Italian). Archived from the original on 2011-06-08.
- "What is "Wet Spinning"". TextileGlossary.com.
- Woodings, Calvin (2001). Regenerated Cellulose Fibres. Woodhead Publishing. ISBN 978-1-85573-459-3.
