= Kolleg =

A Kolleg (German [ˈkɔleːɡ] from Latin collegium) in Germany is a three-year school of adult education, preparing students for the exams leading to the general university entrance qualification, the Abitur (Allgemeine Hochschulreife).

Different from the otherwise similar German evening school, Abendgymnasium, Kolleg classes are in the daytime. Both are state-run schools and do not charge tuition fees. Kolleg students can be eligible for financial aid as regulated in the German Federal Training Assistance Act, Berufsausbildungsförderungsgesetz.

As a rule, the minimum entrance requirements for students are: 19 years of age or older, a Mittlere Reife school leaving certificate, and a formal vocational training completed. However, there are exceptions to that rule, e.g., previous long-term work experience (at least three years) without formal qualification can be recognized as a sufficient substitute for vocational training, which also includes raising children and running a household. Kollegs may additionally require applicants to pass an entrance examination.

Schools are in the competence of each federal state (Bundesland), so that regulations may vary from Bundesland to Bundesland.

The German term Kolleg should not be confused with the English term college.

== Other meanings of Kolleg in German ==
- The word Kolleg is also used in some names of schools of different types, e.g., Aloisiuskolleg, the Kolleg St. Blasien and the Canisius-Kolleg Berlin. These are Gymnasium schools that have been using the word Kolleg since before the newer type of Kolleg was established.
- Kolleg should not be confused with Studienkolleg, a preparatory course at German universities for applicants from abroad. (Like with Kolleg, there are also other schools which carry the word Studienkolleg in their name for reasons of tradition.)
- Berufskollegs are vocational schools that can lead to university entrance qualifications (Fachhochschulreife or Abitur), as well as to certain formal vocational qualifications. Berufskollegs can vary from bundesland to bundesland.
- Kollegschule in Germany was the term for a type of vocational school that existed specifically in the state of North Rhine-Westphalia until the end of the 20th century. These schools have been replaced by Berufskollegs.
