= Berufsoberschule =

Type of school in Germany

Berufsoberschule (German: [bəˈruːfsˌoːbɐʃuːlə], "Upper Vocational School") is an optional part of the German education system, and is an additional way to be allowed at university for students who didn't get an Abitur at a Gymnasium.

== Requirements ==
To be able to enter a Berufsoberschule students have to meet the following requirements:

- Graduation of Berufschule (Vocational School)
- worked in their job for at least five years or a passed exam in an apprenticeship
- average of secondary school graduation marks 3.0 or better in main subjects, or pass an entrance exam

Though not mandatory, students who went to Hauptschule or who graduated Realschule with average or near average marks, are strongly advised to visit a special preclass. There are two major pre classes for people from Hauptschule and Realschule:

1. There is the opportunity for people who got Qualifizierender Hauptschluabschluss to attend a class called Vorklasse, which takes 7 months to complete. Vorklasse could be seen as very similar to 11th grade in Fachoberschule.

2. Many people graduate at Realschule join into Vorkurs, the second form of preclass. This class as well as Vorklasse is often taken as a chance to avoid a trial time in the months between September and December in the 12th grade.

== Second foreign language ==
Students who want to get an Abitur at Berufsoberschule need to either:

a) have had classes of a second foreign language for at least 3 years at another school and at least a graduation mark of 4 (D in US grading system).

b) study a second foreign language (often French) and pass an exam in Berufsoberschule.

== Graduation ==
After one year, students can get a "Fachabitur", which enables them to study at Fachhochschule. If they don't take a second foreign language they get after two years not the "Allgemeine Hochschulreife" (Abitur); instead they get the "Fachgebundene Hochschulreife". With this graduation they are allowed to access university, but only in subjects that belong to the "branch" they studied in at Berufsschule, and by taking a second foreign language they get an Abitur, which gives them full access to university. Berufsoberschule is one of the hardest ways in whole Germany to get a permit to enter Fachhochschule or University
