= Heinz Trökes =

German painter

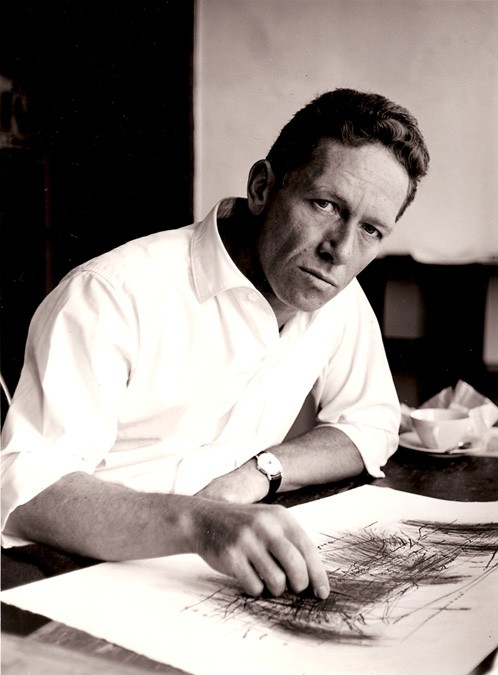
Heinz Trökes, Hamburg 1957

Heinz Trökes (15 August 1913 – 22 April 1997) was a German painter, printmaker and art teacher.

== Biography ==
Trökes was born in Duisburg. After completing his Abitur (school leaving examination) in 1933, Trökes was a pupil of Johannes Itten in Krefeld from 1933 to 1936. From 1936 to 1939, he lived as a painter in Augsburg and earned his living designing textiles with the J. P. Bemberg company. In 1938, his first solo exhibition in the Galerie Nierendorf in Berlin was closed at the initiative of the Nazis. He was then expelled from the Reich Chamber of Culture and had no more opportunities to exhibit until 1945. In 1937 he met Wassily Kandinsky in Paris; the following year, he travelled to Vienna, Budapest, Yugoslavia and once again to Italy. In 1939, Trökes moved to Zurich to emigrate from there to the Dutch East Indies (Indonesia). The outbreak of the Second World War prevented this, however. Returning to Germany in 1940, he studied with Georg Muche in Krefeld, but was and conscripted to the Wehrmacht, until 1942 as a flak soldier in Berlin. He attended the art school of Max Dungert in his free time. He was friends with, among others, Oskar Huth, who provided him with a fake official exemption from the Wehrmacht.

In 1945, Trökes was a co-founder of the Berlin Galerie Gerd Rosen, the first private art gallery in Germany after the war, and remained artistic director until 1946. From 1946 to 1948, a series of cosmonaut-like images was created, including Die Mondkanone (The Moon Cannon), Terrain der Kosmologen (Terrain of the Cosmologists), Sphärische Kontraste (Spheric Contrasts) and Zwei Welten (Two Worlds). He was called to the Staatliche Hochschule für Architektur und Kunst in Weimar (College of Architecture and Art) (today Bauhaus Universität) together with the painter Mac Zimmermann in 1947, but finished teaching after one semester due to excessive external influence. He participated in the exhibition L’Art Allemand Moderne, Deutsche Kunst der Gegenwart (German art of the present) in Baden-Baden. During the blockade from 1948 to 1949, he stayed in Berlin, in Rodenbach near Neuwied on the Rhine, then again in Berlin. In 1949 he married Renata Severin. Trökes published an article in the magazine Les Temps modernes, Paris (Dir. Jean-Paul Sartre) on La peinture et le public en Allemagne. L’inflation d’expositions et le scandale qu’elles provoquent. From 1950 to 1952 he won the Blevin-Davis competition in Munich, stayed in Paris and befriended with Wols and Paul Celan. Trökes joined the Rixes group with Roberto Matta, Jaroslaw Serpan, Jean-Paul Riopelle and Zañartu, among others. Participation in the weekly Jour fixe revolving around André Breton (Benjamin Péret, Marcel Duchamp, Toyen, Max Ernst, Rufino Tamayo and Gérard Hérold). Heinz and Renée Trökes moved to Ibiza in 1952. Here, he created many island pictures, often of a topographical character. He won the Hallmark competition, New York City. In 1954 his son, Jan Manuel, was born. Also in 1955, he received the Deutscher Kritikerpreis and teaching offers from art schools and academies in Berlin, Karlsruhe, Zurich, Stuttgart and Frankfurt, which he, however, declined. In 1955, he participated in documenta 1 in Kassel. (He also participated in further documentas in 1956 (II. documenta) and 1964 (documenta III).

In 1962 he was called to the Staatliche Akademie der Bildenden Künste / State Academy of Fine Arts Stuttgart. Ben Willikens was one of his students among others. From 1965, Trökes taught painting at the Hochschule für bildende Künste, today Berlin University of the Arts. In the same year he also designed a Church window in Leonberg near Stuttgart. In 1966, he experimented with Georg Muche on Helio-Klischographs in Kassel with the aim of manufacturing electrically controlled prints. The quiet images were succeeded by intensively coloured ones. Many of his topics seem rather being influenced by his travels around the world.

Heinz Trökes died in Berlin on 22 April 1997.

== Selected works ==
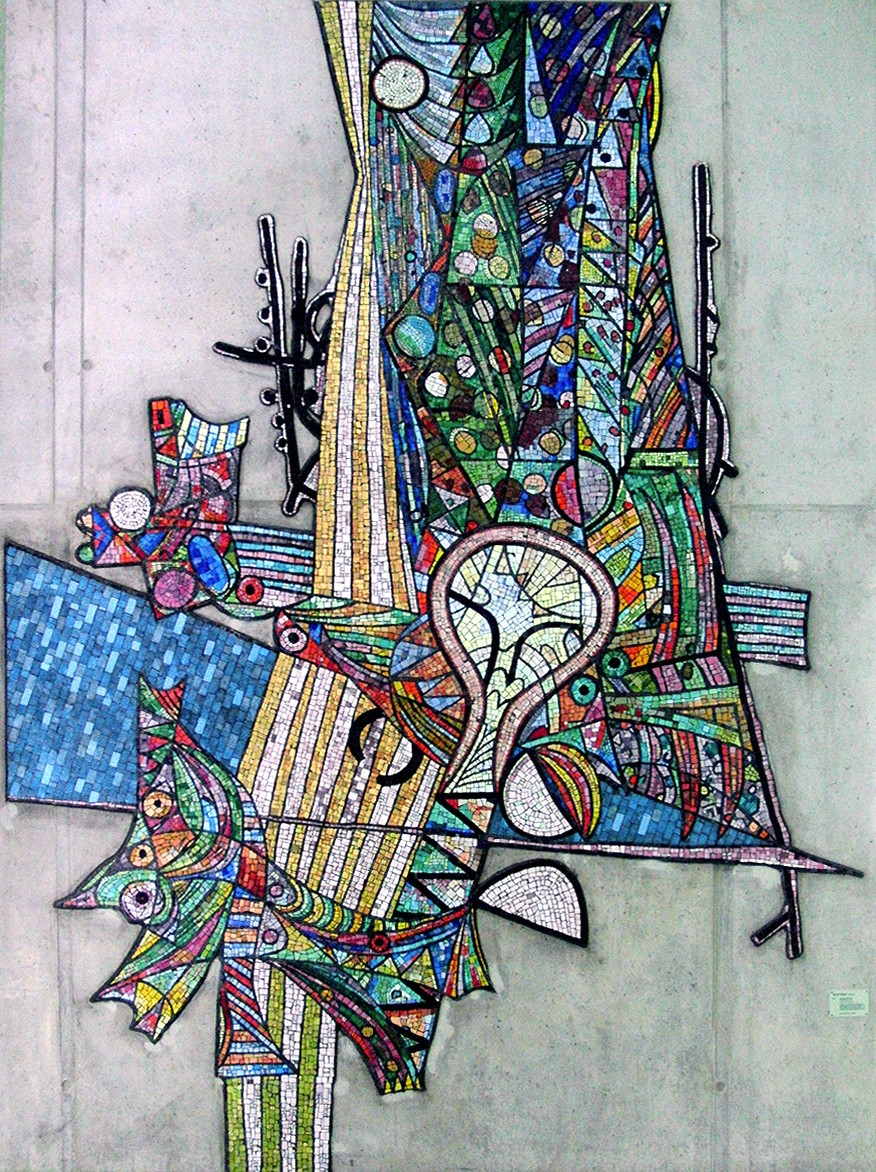
Glass mosaic from Heinz Trökes at Katharinenschule Hamburg

- Die Mondkanone (Moon Cannon) (Berlin, Berlinische Galerie – Museum for Modern Art, Photography and Architecture), 1946; oil on canvas
- Sphärische Kontraste (Spheric Contrasts), 1948; oil on canvas, Neue Nationalgalerie, Berlin
- Am Mars (On Mars), 1948; oil on canvas, Neues Museum, Weimar
- In der Luft und im Wasser (In the Air and in the Water), 1950; oil on canvas, The Busch-Reisinger Museum/Harvard Art Museums, Cambridge, USA
- Zwischen Wolken und Kristallen (Between Clouds and Crystals), 1951; oil on canvas. Albright-Knox Art Gallery, Buffalo, USA
- Echo, 1954; oil on canvas, Lehmbruck Museum, Duisburg
- Für Artisten (For Artists), 1954; oil on canvas, Sprengel Museum Hannover
- Wunschbild für Geologen (Ideal for Geologists) 1956; oil on canvas, Neue Nationalgalerie, Berlin
- Glass mosaic in the Katharinenschule, Hamburg-Hafencity. Production: Puhl & Wagner. Originally for the XI Triennale, Milan. Acquired in 1958/59 by the Hamburg Senate and restored and realised in 2009/10 by the Münchner Hofmanufaktur. Former location: Volksschule an der Katharinenkirche (primary school at St. Catherine’s Church).
- Lettern einer Schrift (Letters of a Document); etching on laid paper, 1960. Museum of Modern Art, New York, USA
- Augenreise (Eye Journey), 1968; Rembrandt Verlag, Berlin – Library of Congress, Washington

== Selected exhibitions ==
- 1949 Solo exhibition in the Kaiser-Wilhelm-Museum, Krefeld. Participation in the Kunst in Deutschland 1930–1949 (Art in Germany 1930–1949) exhibition, Zurich
- 1953 Solo exhibitions in the Von der Heydt Museum, Wuppertal, and in the Städtisches Museum (Municipal museum), Braunschweig, participation in the 2nd São Paulo Art Biennial
- 1954 Exhibition participation: duitse kunst na 1945 (German Art after 1945), Amsterdam, Stedelijk Museum
- 1955 Participation in documenta I, Kassel
- 1959 Participation in documenta II, Kassel
- 1964 Participation in documenta III, Kassel
- 1966 Solo exhibition in the Museu de Arte Moderna do Rio de Janeiro
- 1972 Participation in Continental Painting and Sculpture, 1942–72 in the Albright-Knox Art Gallery
- 1979 Solo exhibitions in the Akademie der Künste (Academy of arts), Berlin, and in the Lehmbruck Museum, Duisburg
- 1983 Solo exhibition in the Neue Nationalgalerie Berlin (sketchbooks presented by Trökes to the Nationalgalerie on the occasion of his 70th birthday)
- 1985 Exhibition participation in the Nationalgalerie in Berlin: Kunst in der Bundesrepublik Deutschland 1945–1985 (Art in the Federal Republic of Germany 1945–1985)
- 1995 Solo exhibition in the Berlin Kupferstichkabinett (Museum of Prints and Drawings) (gift of the sketchbooks 1984–1994)
- 2003 Werke und Dokumente (Works and documents) – Germanisches Nationalmuseum Nuremberg. A catalogue with 122 pages and numerous colors and black-and-white illustrations appeared for the exhibition.
- 2003 Über dem Realen, Werke und Dokumente aus fünfzig Jahren (Above the real, works and documents from fifty years – major monographic show); Neues Museum Weimar
- 2009 Participation: Art of Two Germanys/Cold War Cultures; Los Angeles County Museum of Arts – LACAMA; Kunst und Kalter Krieg; Deutsche Positionen 1945– 1989(Art and Cold War; German positions 1945–1989), Germanisches Nationalmuseum, Nuremberg. Then: Deutsches Historisches Museum, Berlin
- 2013 ELDORADO. Zum 100. Geburtstag von Heinz Trökes (On the occasion of the 100th birthday of Heinz Trökes), Lehmbruck Museum, Duisburg
- 2018 Participation: INVENTUR – ART IN GERMANY 1943–1955, Harvard Art Museums, Cambridge, MA, USA

== Legacy ==
The written legacy, including the journals, was endowed to the Deutsches Kunstarchiv (German art archive) in the Germanisches Nationalmuseum. The sketchbooks were donated to the Staatliche Museen zu Berlin (Berlin State Museums), the Kupferstichkabinett Berlin (Museum of Prints and Drawings).

== Catalogues raisonnés ==
- Markus Krause: Heinz Trökes. Werkverzeichnis (Catalogue raisonné of the oil-paintings). Prestel Verlag, Munich/Berlin/London/New York 2003, ISBN 3-7913-2869-7.
- Online catalogue raisonné on the official website of Trökes-Archive
