= Hochbegabtenstudium =

German educational programme

The Hochbegabtenstudium (German: [ˈhoːxbəˌɡaːptn̩ˌʃtuːdi̯ʊm], "College for the talented") is a programme in Germany that allows students of prerequisite intellectual ability (as shown on IQ tests) to attend college even if they do not hold the Abitur. The Hochbegabtenstudium is also called Schülerstudium ("college for school-students") because many of the students, who benefit from it are still enrolled in school, while they attend college.

== Requirements ==
A person wishing to do the Hochbegabtenstudium must be of above average intellectual ability and must as a rule have completed at least 10th grade. However some exceptions from that rule are made for very young students of superior intellectual ability, who are in a lower grade. In most cases a student wishing to participate in the programme must be at least 16 years old, however again exceptions from this rule are made for students of superior intellectual ability some of whom are only 13 or 14 when they enter college.

== Notable examples ==
In 2009 the case of Felix Dietlein made news. The young student of superior intellectual ability received his master's degree in mathematics (from the University of Cologne) one month before he graduated from his high school. He was only 18 at this time.

== Sources ==
- Stefanie Pohl: "Schülerstudium. Was ist das?"
