= Studienkolleg =

German educational institution

The Studienkolleg is a public educational institution in Germany, Austria and Switzerland, for students whose secondary school certificate is not recognized as equivalent to the Abitur. It is a preparatory course or first year program for academic studies at university.

== Training ==
German is spoken in all courses. The students are prepared in a two-semester course which is subject-specific. Usually these types of courses are offered:

University Preparatory schools

- G-course for the humanities
- W-course for social sciences (including economics and law)
- M-Course for medical studies (medicine, biology, dentistry, pharmacy and veterinary medicine)
- T-Course for technical studies (engineering, math, physics, chemistry) and
- S-Course for philology

Technical College Preparatory schools

- TI-Course for Technical and Engineering studies
- WW-course for Economics and Business studies
- GD-course for Art and Design studies
- SW-course for Social Science studies

== Costs ==
The lessons and tests at the Studienkollegs (except in Dresden and Glauchau) are currently free, but the registered students have to pay semester fees (registration fee, social contribution, semester ticket, etc.). These costs are depending on each college from 100 to 400 euros per semester.

The cost of living (housing, clothing, food and drink etc.) are around 700 euros per month. For the students of Studienkollegs there are usually no scholarships.

== Secondary School Education (Abitur) ==
After two semesters of study the students complete their secondary school education. Exams must be passed in different subjects, such as maths, sciences, economics, languages. In the German language test, students must achieve level C1 of the CEFR. After passing the Studienkolleg, the students can apply to either the university or technical college of their choice. However, graduates of a university-preparatory Studienkolleg cannot attend a Technical College and graduates of a technical-preparatory Studienkolleg cannot attend university.
