= Begabtenprüfung =

German exam

The Begabtenprüfung (German: [bəˈɡaːptn̩ˌpʁyːfʊŋ], "aptitude examination", literally "examination of the gifted") is a college admission examination in Germany which provides an alternative to the Abitur or qualifies the student for a "field-specific Abitur" (Fachgebundene Hochschulreife). Its formal German name is Prüfung für den Hochschulzugang von besonders befähigten Berufstätigen (Examination for College Attendance by Specially Qualified Workers).

== Eligibility ==
Candidates must be 25 or older, unable to enroll in an educational institution and take the non-student Abitur (see below) and not in possession of a field-specific Abitur with the possibility of upgrading it to the general Abitur, and have completed an apprenticeship, trade school training, or governmental/military training and then worked for 5 or more years in that profession, or completed secondary school with a non-college-bound certificate and then have seven or more years of employment and/or as a single head of household with dependents, and show evidence of independent preparation. Those who have failed the examination twice are ineligible to re-take it, subject to the right of individual states to grant exceptions.

== Alternative examinations ==
Instead of the Begabtenprüfung, the states of Brandenburg, Hamburg, Lower Saxony and Saarland offer a Nichtschülerprüfung (examination for non-students) or Externenabitur (external Abitur), formally called a non-student Abitur, Abiturprüfung für Nichtschülerinnen und Nichtschüler. This has a minimum age of 19 and requires the candidate not to have been enrolled in an educational institution during the preceding year, except for special cases such as Waldorf schools.

== Examination ==
The Begabtenprüfung is regulated and administered at the state level by a commission.

The examination consists of an oral and a written component, to be graded at a standard corresponding to the Abitur.

The written examination consists of 3 components each of 4–5 hours:

- a German language test
- a test in the candidate's choice of mathematics or a foreign language
- a test in the subject the person wishes to study, which must be offered by a college in the state (this may be waived for demonstrably qualified candidates)

The oral examination consists of

- a test in mathematics or a foreign language, whichever the candidate did not elect for the written examination
- a test in the subject the person wishes to study
- a test in another subject chosen by the examiners from one of two groups such that it is remote from the candidate's employment expertise but demonstrates his or her well roundedness

== History ==
The Begabtenprüfung dates to before World War II. For example, Fritz Behrens, a communist who became a professor at the University of Leipzig immediately after completing his Habilitation in 1947, had entered university after taking the Begabtenprüfung and received his doctorate in 1935.

After the war, making further education available to those who had been unable to graduate from a gymnasium was a priority in both Western and Russian sectors of Germany, but in the Soviet zone and later the GDR responsibility for the Begabtenprüfung was placed with the college or university rather than the locality; institutions were required to provide Vorstudienanstalten (pre-study institutes) to prepare workers for the examination, and after 1949, to have integrated departments for workers and farmers.
