= Abitur =

Secondary school certificate in Germany, Lithuania and Estonia

Abitur (German pronunciation: [abiˈtuːɐ]), often shortened colloquially to Abi, is a qualification granted at the end of secondary education in Germany. It is conferred on students who pass their final exams at the end of ISCED 3, usually after twelve or thirteen years of schooling (see also, for Germany, Abitur after twelve years). In German, the term Abitur has roots in the older word Abiturium meaning "Leave (Graduation) exam/diploma", which in turn was derived from the Latin abiturus (future active participle of abire, thus "someone who is going to leave").

As a matriculation examination, Abitur can be compared to A-levels, the Matura, the Bagrut certificate or the International Baccalaureate Diploma, which are all ranked as level 4 in the European Qualifications Framework.

== In Germany ==
=== Overview ===
The Zeugnis der Allgemeinen Hochschulreife ("certificate of general qualification for university entrance"), often referred to as Abiturzeugnis ("Abitur certificate"), issued after candidates have passed their final exams and have had appropriate grades in both the last and second last school year, is the document which contains their grades and formally enables them to attend university. Thus, it encompasses the functions of both a school graduation certificate and a college entrance exam.

Abitur confers Allgemeine Hochschulreife (allows students to enter university or Fachhochschule), while there are other ways of obtaining it. In 2005, some 231,000 students obtained Allgemeine Hochschulreife in Germany. This number rose over time to around 263,000 in 2021. Of those, most obtained their Allgemeine Hochschulreife at a Gymnasium, while 40,000 received it at a different kind of school, such as a Gesamtschulen. If those who obtain the Fachhochschulreife (144,399 in 2012) are also added, then the total of those who obtained the right to study at a university or a Fachhochschule is 395,000 (2021).

=== History ===
Until the eighteenth century, every German university had its own entrance examination. In 1788 Prussia introduced the Abiturreglement, a law, for the first time within Germany, establishing the Abitur as an official qualification. It was later also established in the other German states. In 1834, it became the only university entrance exam in Prussia, and it remained so in all states of Germany until 1998. Since then, the German state of Hesse allows students with Fachhochschulreife (see below) to study at the universities within that state.

=== Equivalency ===
The academic level of the Abitur is comparable to the International Baccalaureate, the GCE Advanced Level and the Advanced Placement tests. The study requirements for the International Baccalaureate differ little from the German exam requirements. It is the only school-leaving certificate in all states of Germany that allows the graduate (or Abiturient) to move directly to university. The other school leaving certificates, the Hauptschulabschluss and the Realschulabschluss, do not allow their holders to matriculate at a university. Those granted certificates of Hauptschulabschluss or Realschulabschluss can gain a specialized Fachhochschulreife or an Abitur if they graduate from a Berufsschule and then attend Berufsoberschule or graduate from a Fachoberschule.

However, the Abitur is not the only path to university studies, as some universities set up their own entrance examinations. Students who successfully passed a "Begabtenprüfung" ("aptitude test") are also eligible. A person who does not hold the Abitur and did not take an aptitude test may still be admitted to university by completing at least the 10th year and doing well on an IQ test (see: Hochbegabtenstudium).

==== Other qualifications called Abitur in colloquial usage ====
In German, the European Baccalaureate is called europäisches Abitur, and the International Baccalaureate is called internationales Abitur, neither to be confused with the German Abitur. The French-German Baccalaureate is called deutsch-französisches Abitur, and is equivalent both to the German Abitur and to the French Baccalauréat.

The term Fachabitur was used in all of Western Germany for a variation of the Abitur until the 1990s; the official term for the German qualification is fachgebundene Hochschulreife. This qualification includes only one foreign language (usually, English). The Abitur, in contrast, usually requires two foreign languages. The Fachabitur also allows the graduate to start studying at a university but is limited to a specified range of majors, depending on the specific subjects covered in his Fachabitur examinations. But the graduate is allowed to study for all majors at a Fachhochschule (University of Applied Sciences, in some ways comparable to polytechnics). Today, the school leaving certificate is called fachgebundenes Abitur ('restricted subject Abitur').

The term Fachabitur substitutes in most parts of Germany for the Fachhochschulreife (FHR). It was introduced in West Germany in the 1970s together with the Fachhochschulen. It enables the graduate to start studying at a Fachhochschule and, in Hesse, also at a university within that state. In the Gymnasiums of some states it is awarded in the year before the Abitur is reached. However, the normal way to obtain Fachhochschulreife is graduation from a German Fachoberschule, a vocational high school, also introduced in the 1970s.

The term Notabitur ('emergency Abitur') describes a qualification used only during World War I and World War II. It was granted to male German Gymnasium students who voluntarily enlisted for military service before graduation as well as young women who were evacuated from the major cities before they could complete their Gymnasium education as planned (approximately three to five million children and teenagers had to be evacuated during the war). The Notabitur during World War I included an examination, roughly equivalent to the Abitur exam. The World War II Notabitur, in contrast, was granted without an examination. After the war this was a major disadvantage for the students concerned since, unlike its World War I counterpart, the certificate was generally not recognised in West Germany and never recognised in East Germany. Universities requested the Abitur to consist of written exams including at least two foreign languages (almost always Latin and French, the latter sometimes replaced by English). Students, who received the Notabitur during World War II were offered to re-enter school to prepare for and take the exam after the war had ended. Those special Abitur preparation classes were made up of young adults of different age and sex, which was very unusual at the time.

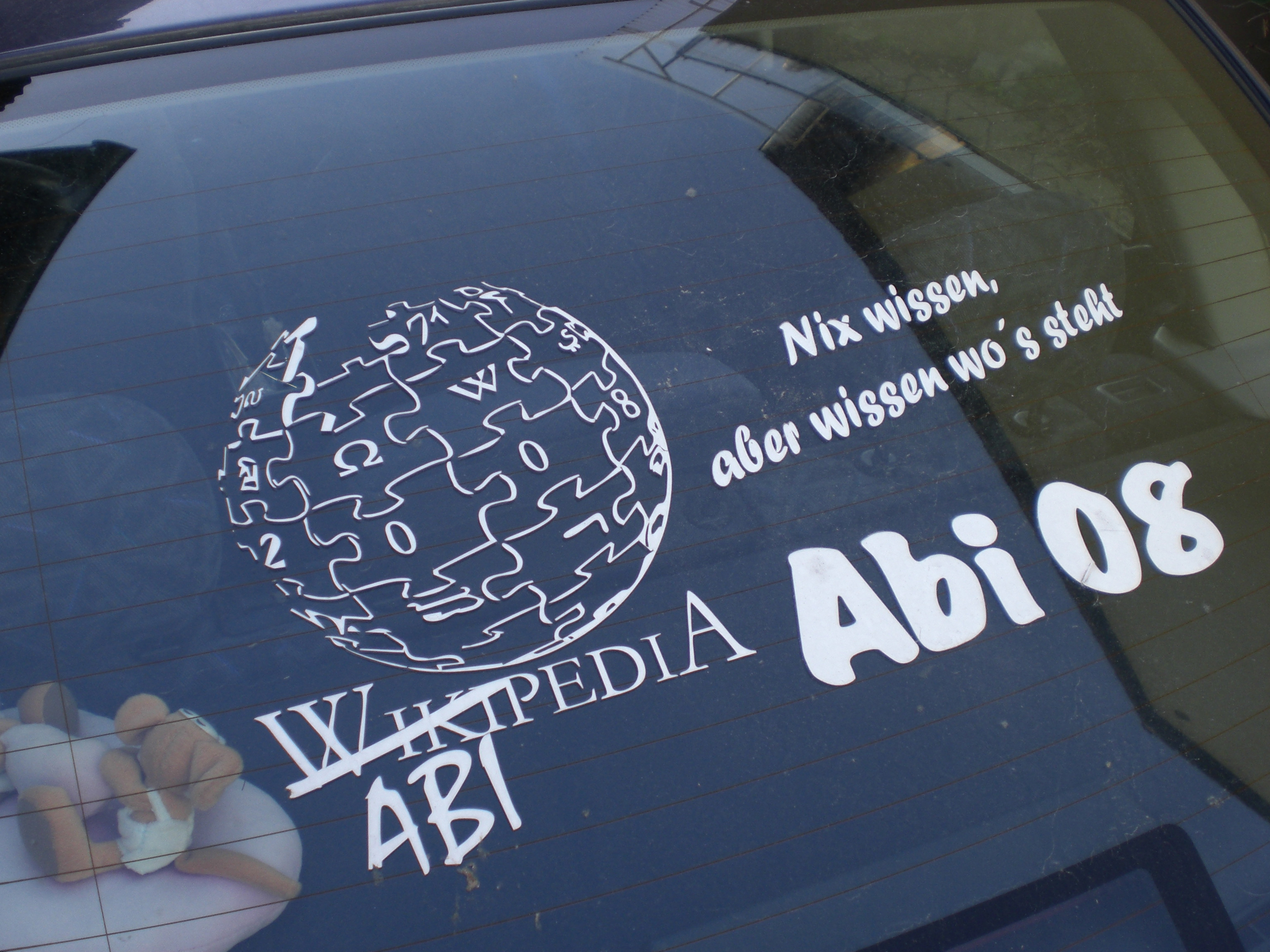
This German graduate (Abiturient) wrote on his car: "Class of 2008: Not knowing anything, but knowing where it is written. Abipedia" (a portmanteau word compiled from Abitur and Wikipedia)

=== Equivalent high school graduation certificate in other countries ===
The equivalent graduation certificate in the Czech Republic, Austria, Poland, Italy and other countries of continental Europe is the Matura; while in England, Wales, Northern Ireland, Singapore, and the West Indies, it is A-levels; in Scotland it is Higher Grade; in the Republic of Ireland it is the Leaving Certificate; in Greece and Cyprus it is the "apolytirion" (a kind of high school diploma); in Malta it is the Matriculation Certificate (MATSEC), in Hungary it is called "Érettségi Bizonyítvány" which translates to Matriculation Certificate.

In Australia, the graduation certificate awarded to high school students is the Senior Secondary Certificate of Education (SSCE). However, the name of the SSCE varies from state to state. In Victoria, it is called the Victorian Certificate of Education (VCE); in New South Wales it is called the Higher Schools Certificate (HSC).

In India various states name it differently. Each Indian state has its own examination board, some individual states having their own entrance test system. Passing the specified examination qualifies the student to enter into undergraduate program in a university. For example, in the states of Andhra Pradesh and Telangana this is known as Board of Intermediate Examination (BIE).

For professional, specialist programs and well reputed institutions there are entrance tests. For engineering there is a Joint Engineering Entrance Joint Entrance Examination conducted at all India level. For medical undergraduate MBBS programs there is a national eligibility and entrance test known as NEET-UG National Eligibility and Entrance Test conducted at all of India. There is also an all India level examination conducted by Central Board of Secondary education CBSE the certification is known as Higher Secondary Certificate (HSC).

=== Exams ===
During the final examinations (Abiturprüfungen), students are tested in four or five subjects (at least one of which is oral). Procedures vary by state.

Course	Type of examination
1st advanced course	Written
2nd advanced course	Written
Basic course or 3rd advanced course	Written
Basic course	Oral
Basic course	Oral, presentation or BLL (literally "exceptional learning achievement", a 20-page paper or success in a recognized competition)

Although tested subjects are chosen by the student, three areas must be covered:

- Language, literature and the arts
  - German, Sorbian (in Saxony and Brandenburg), foreign languages (typically English, French, Latin, Greek, Spanish, Italian or Russian; rarely Dutch, Chinese, Japanese, Ancient Hebrew, Turkish, Modern Greek, Portuguese or Polish).
  - Music, visual or performing arts, literature
- Social sciences
  - Political science, history, geography, economics
  - Psychology, philosophy, religion, ethics
- Mathematics, natural sciences and technology
  - Mathematics, physics, chemistry, biology
  - Computer science, technology, nutritional science
- Sports

Occasionally, schools (especially berufsorientierte Gymnasien) offer vocational subjects such as pedagogy, business informatics, biotechnology and mechanical engineering.

Final exams are usually taken from March to May or June. Papers are graded by at least two teachers at the school. In some parts of Germany students may prepare a presentation, research paper or participate in a competition as an additional achievement "besondere Lernleistung," which in some states may replace the fourth or fifth exam subjects, and in some states may take additional oral exams to pass the Abitur if the written exam is poor.

Before reunification, Abitur exams were given locally in West Germany, but Bavaria has conducted centralized exams (Zentralabitur) since 1854. After reunification, most states of the former East Germany continued centralized exams, and at the beginning of the 21st century, many states adopted centralized exams. In 2013, all other states except Rheinland-Pfalz also introduced centralized written exams at least in the core subjects (German, mathematics and the first foreign language, usually English).

The Kultusministerkonferenz (KMK) of several states expanded the exams to scientific subjects and the social sciences.

The structure of the exams vary by state, as education in Germany is managed by each state rather than by the federation. Basic level exams may last up to four hours, e.g. the basic level math exam in Hamburg, while Advanced level exams may last up to six hours. Oral exams can in many states be replaced by a presentation and a colloquium, taking a total of around 30 minutes.

=== Scoring ===
Each semester of a subject studied in the final two years yields up to 15 points for a student, where advanced courses may count double, depending on the state.

The exact scoring system depends on the Bundesland in which one takes Abitur. Passing the Abitur usually requires a composite score of at least 50%. Students with a score below that minimum fail and do not receive an Abitur. There are some other conditions that the student also has to meet in order to receive the Abitur: taking mandatory courses in selected subject areas, and limits to the number of failing grades in core subjects. Finally, students often have the option of omitting some courses from their composite score if they have taken more courses than the minimum required.

The best possible grade of 1.0 can be achieved if the score ranges between 823 and 900 points; the fraction of students achieving this score is normally only around 0.2%–3% even among the already selective population of Abitur candidates. Around 12%–30% of Abitur candidates achieve grades between 1.0 and 1.9.

German gymnasium grade system
Grades by education		Descriptor	Equivalent	
Grading	Abitur grade		US system (approximately) (Note: This conversion serves as an orientation, conversions might differ.))	UK system (approximately)
15 points	1.0	"sehr gut" (very good: an outstanding achievement)	A	A*
14 points	1.0	"sehr gut" (very good: an outstanding achievement)	A	A*
13 points	1.3	"sehr gut" (very good: an outstanding achievement)	A	A
12 points	1.7	"gut" (good: an achievement substantially above average requirements)	A	A
11 points	2.0	"gut" (good: an achievement substantially above average requirements)	A−	B
10 points	2.3	"gut" (good: an achievement substantially above average requirements)	A−	B
9 points	2.7	"befriedigend" (satisfactory: an achievement which corresponds to average requirements)	B+	C
8 points	3.0	"befriedigend" (satisfactory: an achievement which corresponds to average requirements)	B	C
7 points	3.3	"befriedigend" (satisfactory: an achievement which corresponds to average requirements)	B−	C
6 points	3.7	"ausreichend" (sufficient: an achievement which barely meets the requirements)	C	D
5 points	4.0	"ausreichend" (sufficient: an achievement which barely meets the requirements)	D	E
4 points	N/A	"mangelhaft" / "ungenügend" / "nicht bestanden" (not sufficient / failed: an achievement that does not meet the requirements)	F	U (Ungraded)
3 points	N/A	"mangelhaft" / "ungenügend" / "nicht bestanden" (not sufficient / failed: an achievement that does not meet the requirements)	F	U (Ungraded)
2 points	N/A	"mangelhaft" / "ungenügend" / "nicht bestanden" (not sufficient / failed: an achievement that does not meet the requirements)	F	U (Ungraded)
1 point	N/A	"mangelhaft" / "ungenügend" / "nicht bestanden" (not sufficient / failed: an achievement that does not meet the requirements)	F	U (Ungraded)
0 points	N/A	"mangelhaft" / "ungenügend" / "nicht bestanden" (not sufficient / failed: an achievement that does not meet the requirements)	F	U (Ungraded)

=== Statistics ===
Historically, very few people received their Abitur in Germany because many attractive jobs did not require one. The number of persons holding the Abitur has steadily increased since the 1970s, and younger jobholders are more likely to hold the Abitur than older ones. The percentage of students qualified for tertiary education is still lower than the OECD average.

Percentage of students graduating with Abitur or FHR (Studienberechtigtenquote):

Year	2000	2001	2002	2003	2004	2005	2006	2007	2008	2009	2010
Percentage	37.2%	36.1%	38.2%	39.2%	41.5%	42.5%	43.4%	44.5%	45.1%	46.5%	49.0%

Percentage of 'jobholders' holding Hauptschulabschluss, Realschulabschluss or Abitur in Germany:

	1970	1982	1991	2000
Hauptschulabschluss	87.7%	79.3%	66.5%	54.9%
Realschulabschluss	10.9%	17.7%	27%	34.1%
Abitur	1.4%	3%	6.5%	11%

== International Abitur ==
The International Abitur is offered at schools outside Germany that are accredited by the German government. The five Abitur exams (three written exams and two oral exams) are in the following subjects: German literature, European history or economics or mathematics or a natural science or a language. In February of the final (12th) year, all students take the written examinations for the German International Abitur in three subjects including German. In late spring, students have mandatory oral examinations in two subjects, which are overseen by a German educational official. The final GPA includes grades from both junior and senior years, as well as for the five Abitur exams. The final diploma that students receive after successful completion of these exams allows them to qualify for admission to universities in Germany.

== See also ==
- Education in Germany
- Abitur after twelve years
